= Lahewa =

Coordinates: 1°22′26″N 97°18′1″E

Lahewa, also Lahia, is a village and sub-district (kecamatan) of North Nias Regency on Nias Island, in the North Sumatra province of Sumatra, Indonesia. Forming part of the northwestern coast of Nias Island, in 2001 the sub-district had a population of 26,548 people. The main village of Lahewa is the third largest settlement on the island, and is home to a mosque and several guesthouses.

== History ==
Missionaries visited Nias Island in the early 20th century, and Christianity was reported to have spread to Lahewa by 1915. Lahewa and Nias Island were struck hard by the Indian Ocean tsunami of 26 December 2004. 150 were reported dead and 3000 homeless in Lahewa, Sirombu and Mandrehe, the tsunami destroying most of the fishing boats.

Due to the poverty-stricken conditions, the people of Lahewa have traditionally suffered from diarrhoea, malaria and dengue fever. The International Federation of Red Cross and Red Crescent Societies (IFRC), with support from Canadian Red Cross have worked together to improve water and sanitation conditions in the area. Cornelius Zalukhu has been the local governor of the kecamatan.

== Geography ==
Lahewa is approximately 80 kilometres (50 mi) by road from the regional capital of Gunung Sitoli. In 2001 the subdistrict had a population of 26,548 people, in an area covering 446.05 square kilometres (172.22 sq mi). It contains 21 desa/kelurahan (village communities). The third largest settlement on Nias Island, the wider sub-district forms the peninsula on the northwest coast, with many caverns among the cliffs and over 130 islands offshore. Geologically it forms the Nias-Lahewa Sub-basin.

== Landmarks ==
The principal place of worship in Lahewa village is Gereja Katolik Lahewa mosque. It is home to several guesthouses, including Siang Malam, a restaurant and guesthouse with 5 rooms upstairs, and Mentari, a two-storey wooden house with 10 double rooms.
