= Neoserica niasica =

Scientific classification
- Kingdom: Animalia
- Phylum: Arthropoda
- Clade: Pancrustacea
- Class: Insecta
- Order: Coleoptera
- Suborder: Polyphaga
- Infraorder: Scarabaeiformia
- Family: Scarabaeidae
- Genus: Neoserica
- Species: N. niasica

Binomial name
- Neoserica niasica Moser, 1915

Species of beetle

Neoserica niasica is a species of beetle of the family Scarabaeidae. It is found in Indonesia (Nias).

== Description ==
Adults reach a length of about 10 mm (0.39 in). The upper surface is blackish-brown and densely tomentose, and the underside is a lighter brown. The frons is widely punctured, with scattered setae beside the eyes. The clypeus is slightly wrinkled, shallowly punctured, weakly convex in the middle, narrowing anteriorly. The margins of the clypeus are upturned, the anterior margin is very faintly emarginate. The antennae are yellowish-brown. The pronotum is densely punctured, the punctures bearing minute setae. The anterior margin of the pronotum is arched in the middle, and the margins are slightly curved and bristled, the anterior angles are pointed, the posterior angles are rounded. The elytra bear punctate striae, the flatly convex intermediate spaces are widely punctate, the middle of the intervals shows a narrow, unpunctate longitudinal stripe. The pygidial margin is quite densely punctured, very weakly wrinkled, and bears a few setae before the posterior margin. The thorax shows a torn longitudinal line in the middle and a row of setae on each side.
