= Neoserica insulana =

Scientific classification
- Kingdom: Animalia
- Phylum: Arthropoda
- Clade: Pancrustacea
- Class: Insecta
- Order: Coleoptera
- Suborder: Polyphaga
- Infraorder: Scarabaeiformia
- Family: Scarabaeidae
- Genus: Neoserica
- Species: N. insulana

Binomial name
- Neoserica insulana Moser, 1915

Species of beetle

Neoserica insulana is a species of beetle of the family Scarabaeidae. It is found in Indonesia (Nias).

== Description ==
Adults reach a length of about 9 mm (0.35 in). They are dull, blackish-brown above, and light brown below. The frons is widely punctate, with scattered setae beside the eyes. The clypeus is weakly wrinkled, indistinctly punctate, with a slight marginal elevation in the middle. It is smudged towards the front, the margins are raised, and the anterior margin is slightly indented. The antennae are yellowish-brown. The pronotum is densely covered with minutely bristle-bearing punctures. The lateral margins have long setae, the anterior angles are projecting, the posterior angles are obtuse and delineated. The anterior margin projects slightly in a curved shape in the middle. The elytra bear rows of punctures with minute setae. On the pygidium, the punctures are densely packed, with some setae in front of the posterior margin. The thorax is only very weakly longitudinally grooved in the middle and bears a row of erect setae on both sides.
