= Sirombu =

Sirombu is an administrative district (kecamatan) within West Nias Regency of North Sumatra Province of Indonesia. It is mainly on Nias Island (off the west coast of Sumatra), but also includes the Hinako Islands to the west of Nias. It is administered from the village of Tetesua, which is part of Sirombu desa (situated on Nias Island), which also includes the small coastal islands of Pulau Siite and Pulau Lawandra.

The district covers a total area of 162.51 km^{2} and in mid 2024 it had 14,101 inhabitants comprising 5,353 on the Hinoko Islands and 8,748 on the "mainland" of Nias. It comprises 25 administrative villages ([desa), listed below with their populations as at mid 2024, of which the first twelve (in the left-hand column) comprise the Hanako Islands and the latter thirteen (in the right-hand column) are on the island of Nias.

- Bawosaloo (528)
- Imana (1,071)
- Tuwa Tuwa (420)
- Kafo Kafo (302)
- Bawasawa (442)
- Pulau Bogi (264)
- Halamona (206)
- Hanofa (841)
- Lahawa (120)
- Hinako (580)
- Sinene Eto (251)
- Balowondrate (328)
- Sirombu (1,183)
- Togideu (1,056)
- Tugala (512)
- Tugalagawu (578)
- Fadoro (644)
- Orahili (329)
- Gunung Cahaya (1,108)
- Sisobandrao (913)
- Togim Bogi (492)
- Tetehosi (199)
- Ombolata (475)
- Lahusa (559)
- Hilimberuanaa (700)
