= West Nias Regency =

Regency in North Sumatra, Indonesia

Coordinates: 1.0597°N 97.5861°E

West Nias Regency Kabupaten Nias Barat
- Regency
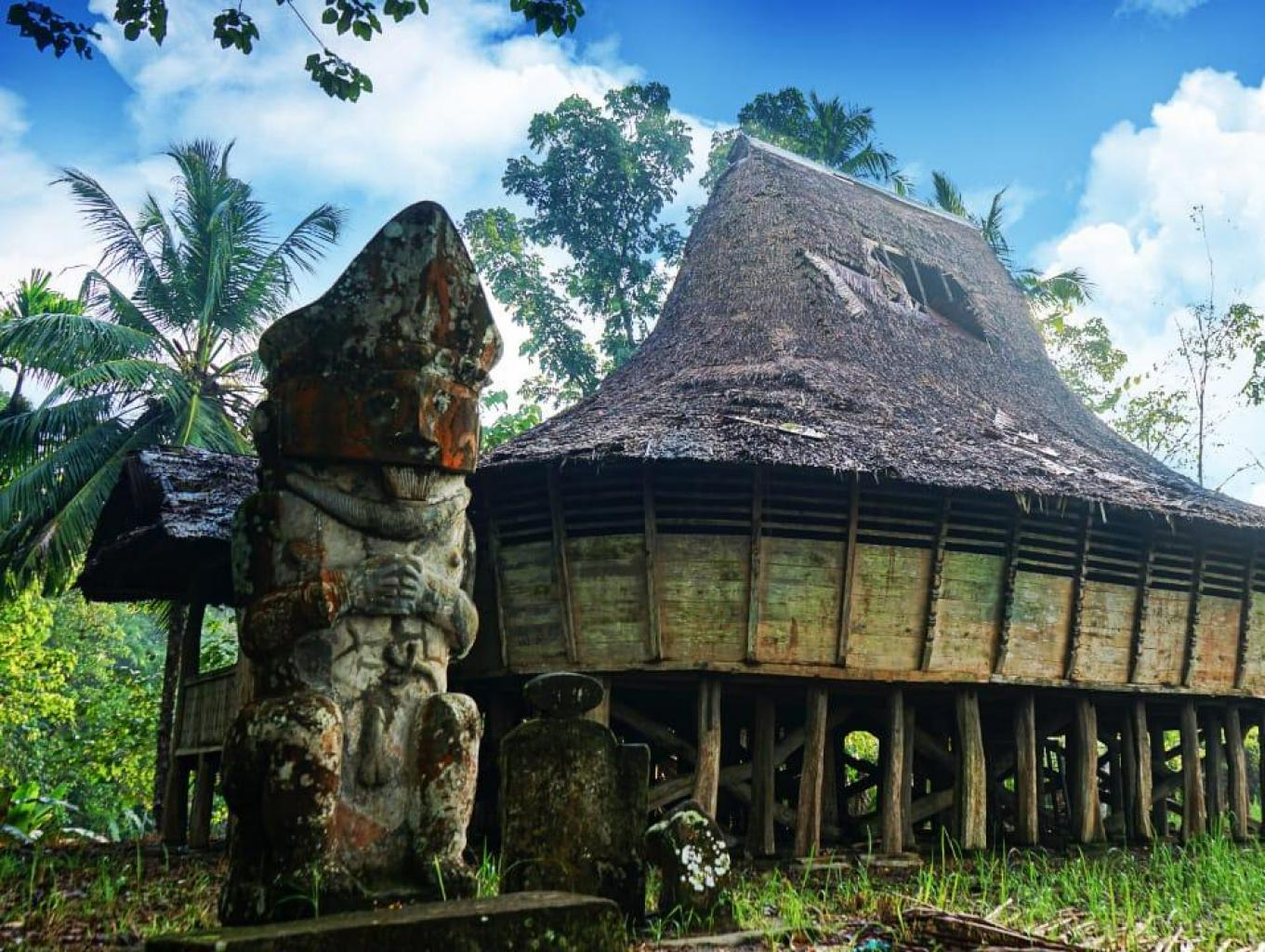
- A traditional Nias house and megalithic statue in Sisarahili

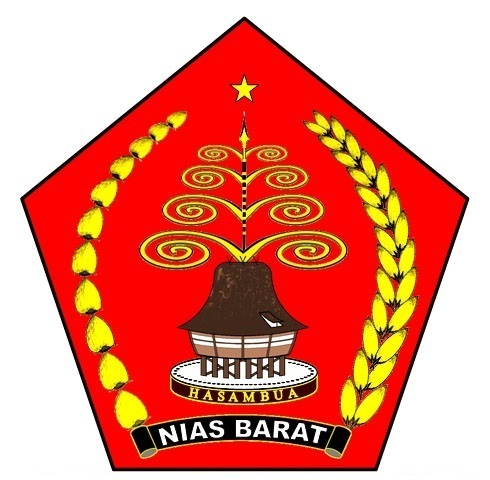
- Seal
- Motto: Hasambua (Only One)
- Country: Indonesia
- Province: North Sumatra
- Regency seat: Lahömi

Government
  - Regent: Eliyunus Waruwu
  - Vice Regent: Sozisokhi Hia

Area
  - Total: 520.34 km^{2} (200.90 sq mi)

Population (mid 2025 estimate)
  - Total: 97,740
  - Density: 187.8/km^{2} (486.5/sq mi)
- Time zone: UTC+7 (WIB)
- HDI (2022): ▲0.629 (Medium)
- Website: niasbaratkab.go.id

West Nias Regency is a regency in North Sumatra province of Indonesia. The regency seat is located in the Lahomi district. It covers the western portion of Nias Island. The regency covers an area of 520.34 km^{2}, and had a population of 81,807 at the 2010 census and 89,994 at the 2020 census; the official estimate as of mid 2025 was 97,740 (comprising 48.7% males and 51.3% females). This regency was created on 29 October 2008 (together with neighbouring North Nias Regency) by Law Number 46 of 2008 from districts which had previously been part of Nias Regency.

== History ==
The regency was created from western districts of then-larger Nias Regency in 2008 based on Law Number 46 of 2008. The region itself contained several megalithic sites, concentrated in Mandrehe district. Within the region, there are many megalithic sites, which some have been declared a cultural heritage. The megalithic sites are dated between 500 and 2,500 years old.

== Geography ==
West Nias Regency borders North Nias Regency in the north, South Nias Regency in the south, Nias Regency in the east, and the Indian Ocean in the west. The regency is located at elevation of between 0 and 800 metres above sea level. The largest district in the regency is Sirombu District with its area consisting of 23% of the regency's total area, followed by Lahomi District with 17%, and Mandrehe District with 14.91%. The smallest district by area is Ulu Moro'o with only 28.58 square kilometres or 5.49% of total regency area. The regency includes 10 small islands outside of the island of Nias, five of which are inhabited.

== Demographics ==
The regency has population of 97,740 based on mid 2025 estimates. From this figure, 48.7% are males and 51.3% are females, with a sex ratio of the total population at 100 females per 95 males. Mandrehe is the most populous district with 24,029 people while the least populated district is Ulu Moro'o district with only 7,956 people. As with most of regions in Indonesia, the regency is dominated by economically active age above 15 years old. Most of the population are employed in agriculture-related sector.

== Economy ==
The regency is largerly agrarian, with agriculture and fishery dominates the regency's GRDP with figure of 54.41% in 2022. This followed by trade sector with 12.26% of the regency's GRDP and construction sector with 9.29% in the same year. Total regency's gross regional domestic product at 2022 was Rp1,324.38 billion with economic growth of 3.01% in the same year.

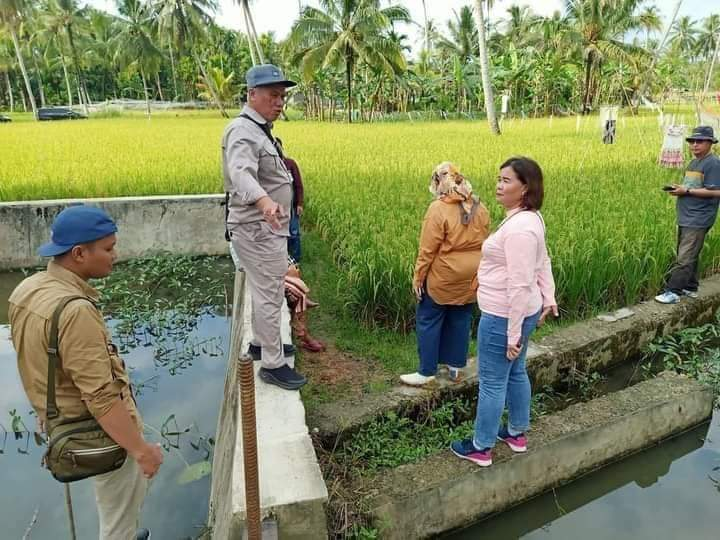
Rice field in West Nias

=== Agriculture ===
In 2017 the regency had 4,586 hectares of rice field and 20,363 hectares of maize field. In 2022, the amount of rice produced by the regency was 14,127 tonnes. The rice-producing districts of the regency are Moro'o and West Mandrehe with production of 4,426 and 2,839 tonnes respectively. On the other hand, Mandrehe District produces the most maize with cultivated area of 32 hectares and output of 67.2 tonnes of maize in 2017. Other produce in the regency includes cassava with 645.6 tonnes output in 2017 and 7.5 hectares for chili pepper and 1.25 hectares for water spinach cultivation in 2022. The regency produces many horticulture crops. There was a significant increase in horticulture crops production between 2015 and 2016, from total of 219 tonnes to 373 tonnes.

West Nias also has plantations with output in 2017 are rubber with 2,264 tonnes, followed by coconut plantations with 2,748 tonnes, cocoa bean with 413 tonnes, and areca nut with 14.4 tonnes. Moro'o District has the largest rubber output of 979 tonnes between 2016 and 2017, while Lahomi District produces the most coconut with 1,419 tonnes.

Livestock population in the regency is dominated by chicken and pig. Meat production of the regency amounts 40.03 tonnes for bigger livestocks and 37.12 tonnes for poultry meat in 2022. In addition to that, there were 5,246 kilograms of chicken egg production and 495.30 kilograms of duck egg production within the same year.

=== Tourism ===
The regency has total 10 registered hotels. There are 41 sites of megalithic structures in the regency, in addition to 129 registered recreational areas. However, tourism remains small compared to the other sector due to lack of accommodation and promotion. Most of the tourist visiting the regency are local tourists from within Indonesia, with their number recorded in 2022 as 55,000.

== Governance ==
=== Administration ===
The regency is divided into eight districts (kecamatan), tabulated below with their areas (in km^{2}) and their populations at the 2010 census and the 2020 census, together with the official estimates for mid 2025. The table also includes the locations of their administrative centres, the number of villages (all classed as rural desa) within each district, and its post code.

Kode wilayah	Name of district (kecamatan)	Area in km^{2}	Pop'n census 2010	Pop'n census 2020	Pop'n estimate mid 2025	Admin centre	No. of villages	Post code
12.25.02	Sirombu ^{(a)}	118.79	9,478	13,077	13,433	Tetesua	25	22863
12.25.01	Lahomi	88.39	7,548	10,454	10,357	Sitolubanua	11	22864
12.25.08	Ulu Moro'o	28.58	7,666	6,702	7,956	Lawelu	5	22862
12.25.07	Lolofitu Moi ^{(b)}	53.84	13,674	10,384	11,214	Lolofitu	8	22875
12.25.06	Mandrehe Utara (North Mandrehe)	39.56	7,920	9,062	10,089	Lahagu	12	22813
12.25.05	Mandrehe	77.59	18,697	22,077	24,029	Fadoro	20	22862 ^{(c)}
12.25.03	Mandrehe Barat (West Mandrehe)	61.29	7,384	8,243	9,358	Lasarafaga	14	22812
12.25.04	Moro'o ^{(d)}	52.30	9,440	9,995	11,304	Hilifadolo	10	22862
	Totals	520.34	81,807	89,994	97,740	Lahomi	105	

Notes: (a) Sirombu District includes the eleven offshore Hinako Islands; in mid 2024, the 14,101 inhabitants comprised 5,353 on the Hinoko Islands and 8,748 on the "mainland" of Nias.
(b) situated in the east of the regency, this landlocked district borders on Gunungsitoli City and Nias Regency. (c) except the village of Hayo, with a post code of 22867.
(d) Moro'o District in the northwest of the regency faces Tugala Oyo District (in the south of North Nias Regency).

=== Local government and politics ===
West Nias Regency Regional House of Representatives Dewan Perwakilan Rakyat Daerah Kabupaten Nias Barat

Type
- Type: Unicameral

History
- New session started: 30 October 2019

Structure
- Seats: 20
- Political groups: PDI-P (5) NasDem (4) PKB (1) Hanura (4) Demokrat (1) PAN (1) Golkar (2) Gerindra (2)

Elections
- Voting system: Open list

The regency is part of North Sumatra 8th electoral district, along with Gunungsitoli, Nias Regency, North Nias Regency, and South Nias Regency, which combined have 6 representatives in the provincial parliament. At the regency level, it is divided into two electoral districts and has a total of 20 elected representatives.

Electoral District	Region	Representatives
West Nias 1st	Lahomi, Sirombu, West Mandrehe, Moro'o	9
West Nias 2nd	Mandrehe, North Mandrehe, Lolofitu Moi, Ulu Moro'o	11

== Infrastructure ==
A national road - the Nias Ring Road (Indonesian: Jalan Lingkar Nias) - goes through the regency where it has a total length of 24 kilometres. Other roads in the regency are either provincial or regency roads, with a total for all roads in the regency of 724.69 kilometres. Only 38% of the total roads are paved as of 2022. The regency has no airport and the closest airport serving the entire Nias Island is Binaka Airport in Gunungsitoli.

The regency has 58 kindergartens, 107 elementary schools, 39 junior highschools, and 16 senior highschools. In addition, the regency also has one private college, Anugerah Mission Theological College. Healthcare infrastructure in the regency includes one public hospital which is Pratama Onolimbu Hospital, operated by the regency government, in addition to 3 clinics, 39 puskesmas, and 202 healthcare centers. Pratama Onolimbu Hospital is the main and only hospital in the regency and was classified by Ministry of Health as D-class hospital. Electricity in the regency is supplied by PLTD Moawo and PLTD Idanoi, both are diesel generators located in Gunungsitoli by Perusahaan Listrik Negara.
