= Gunungsitoli =

City in North Sumatra, Indonesia

- City
- City of Gunungsitoli; Kota Gunungsitoli
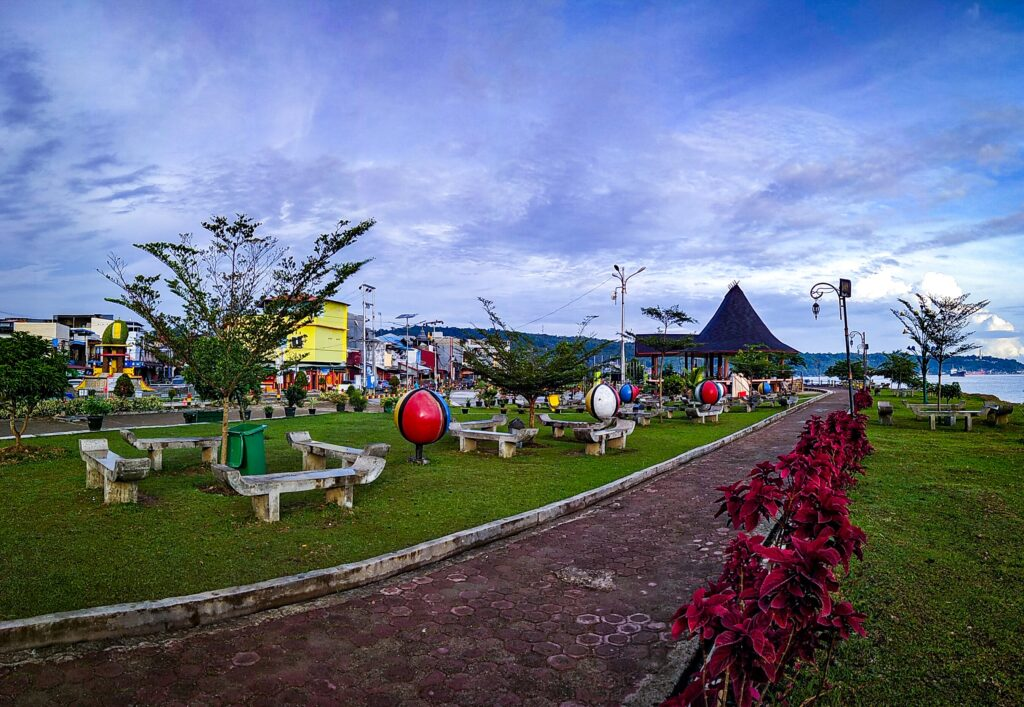
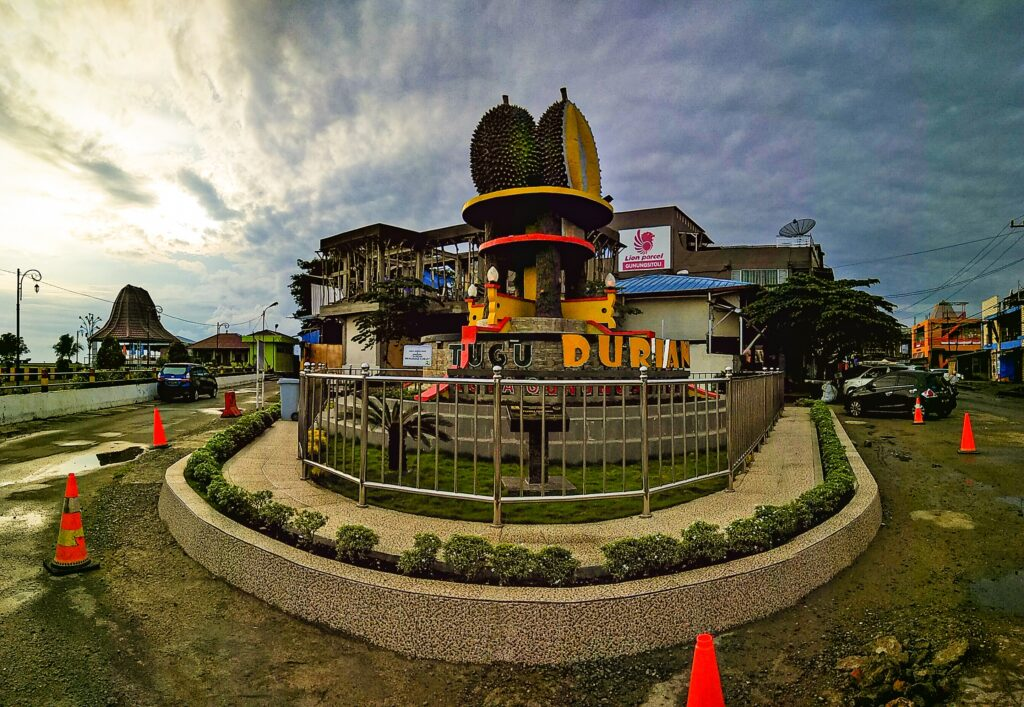
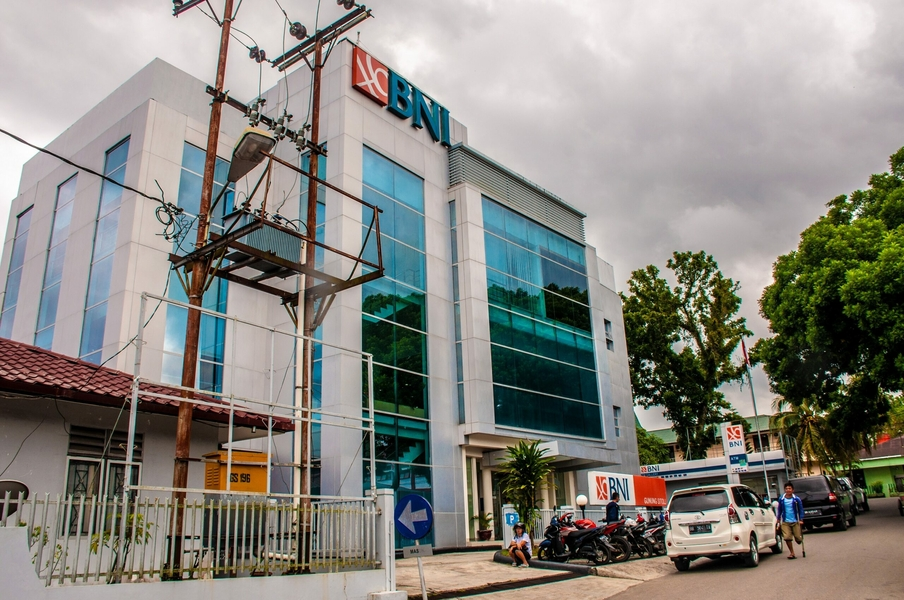
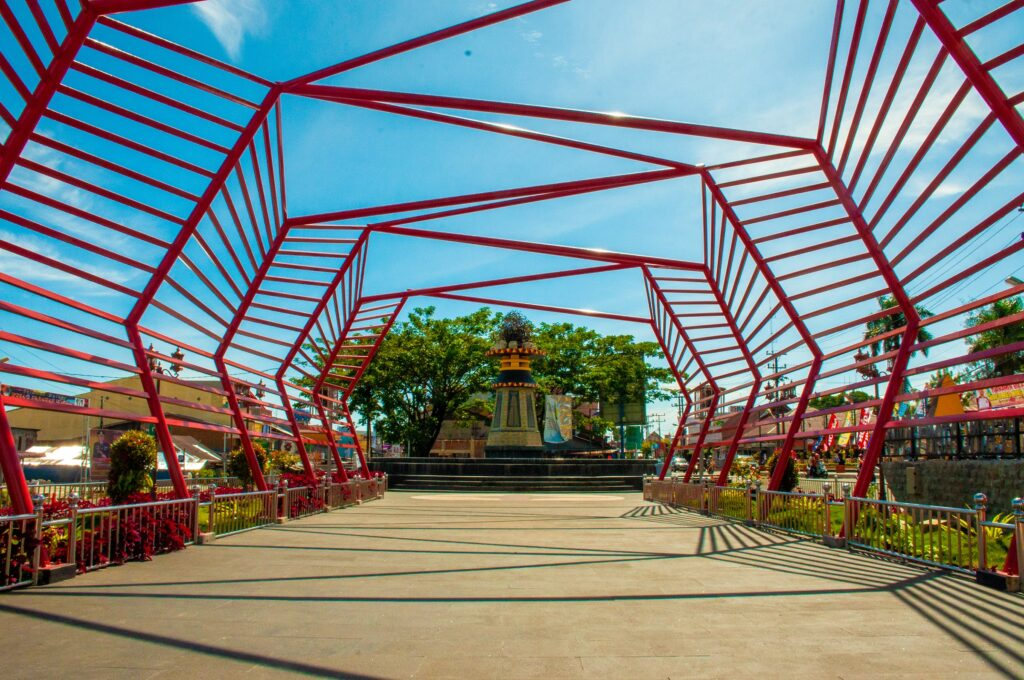
- Clockwise, from top: Ya'ahowu Park, BNI Gunungsitoli, Nias Earthquake Memorial Park, Durian Monument

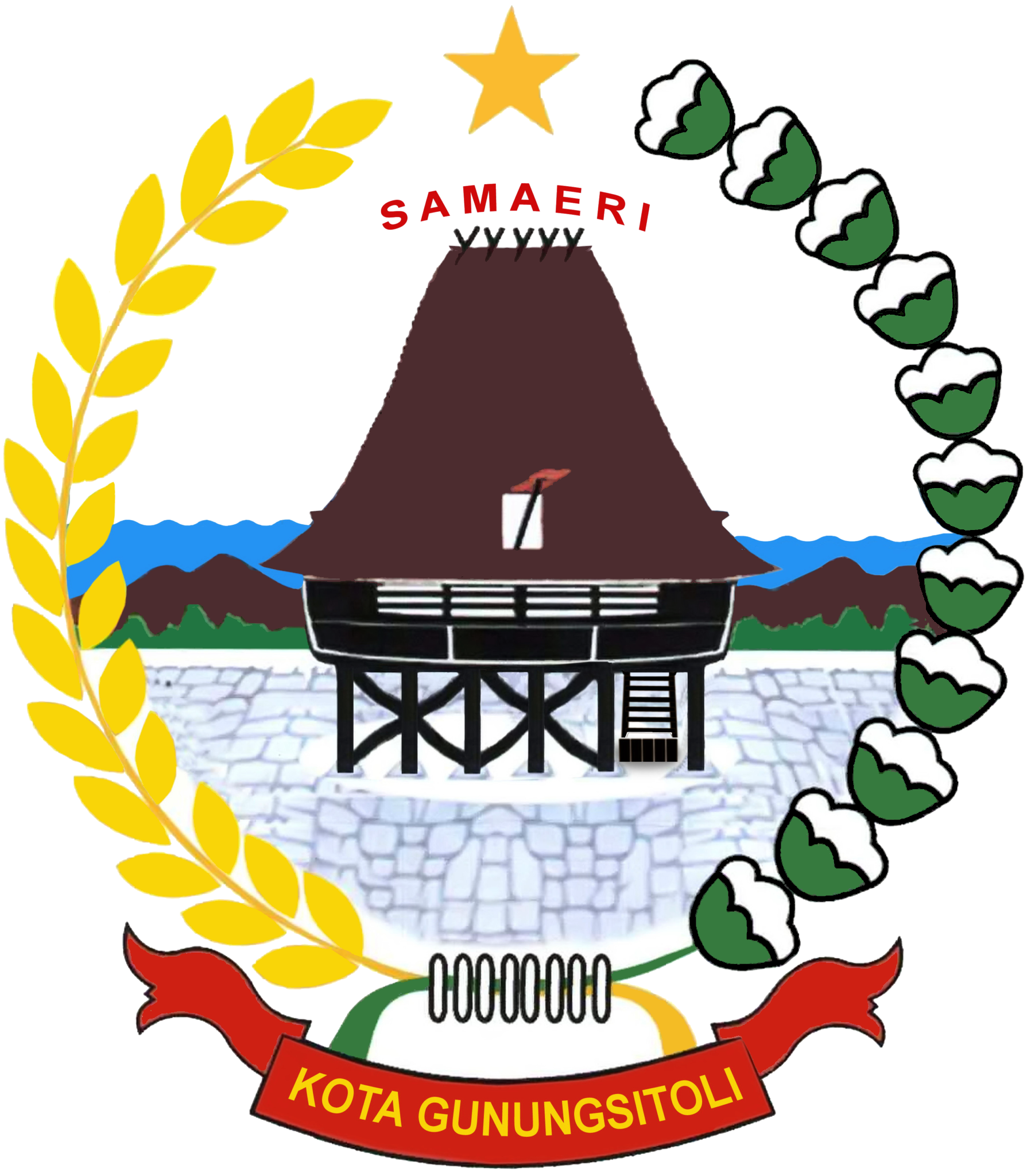
- Seal
- Motto(s): Samaeri ("Guarding & guiding")
- Location within North Sumatra

- Location in Sumatra Gunungsitoli (Indonesia)
- Coordinates: 1°17′N 97°37′E
- Country: Indonesia
- Province: North Sumatra

Government
  - Mayor: Sowa'a Laoli
  - Vice Mayor: Marthinus Lase

Area
  - Total: 469.36 km^{2} (181.22 sq mi)

Population (mid 2024 estimate)
  - Total: 145,233
  - Density: 309.43/km^{2} (801.41/sq mi)
- Time zone: UTC+7 (Indonesia Western Time)
- Area code: (+62) 639
- HDI (2022): ▲0.702 (High)
- Website: gunungsitolikota.go.id

Gunungsitoli (Nias pronunciation: [gu.nuŋ.si.to.li]) is a city located in North Sumatra province, Indonesia, on the Indian Ocean island of Nias, west of Sumatra. Gunungsitoli is the island's only city and is the main hub for the island and surrounding smaller islands. Located on the north-eastern side of Nias island, the city was historically a series of fortifications made by the Dutch colonial administration in the 1600s to defend against frequent raids from Nias tribes, especially those from southern parts of the island. Until 1914, it was the only part of the island that was effectively controlled by the Dutch.

Gunungsitoli had a population of 126,202 at the 2010 Census and 136,017 at the 2020 Census; in mid 2024, Gunungsitoli had a population of 145,233 (comprising 70,954 males and 74,279 females); it was officially projected to rise to 147,516 by mid 2025, and reach 150,000 in mid 2026. which makes it the seventh-most-populous city in North Sumatra. It had a population density of 309 people per square kilometre in 2024, making it the most-densely populated place on Nias island. Being the only city in the island, Gunungsitoli is the economic hub of the island and the surrounding Nias archipelago, as well as the only place with significant, non-agriculture industries, on the island. The city was previously part of the larger Nias Regency but was separated on 29 October 2008.

== History ==
=== Precolonial ===
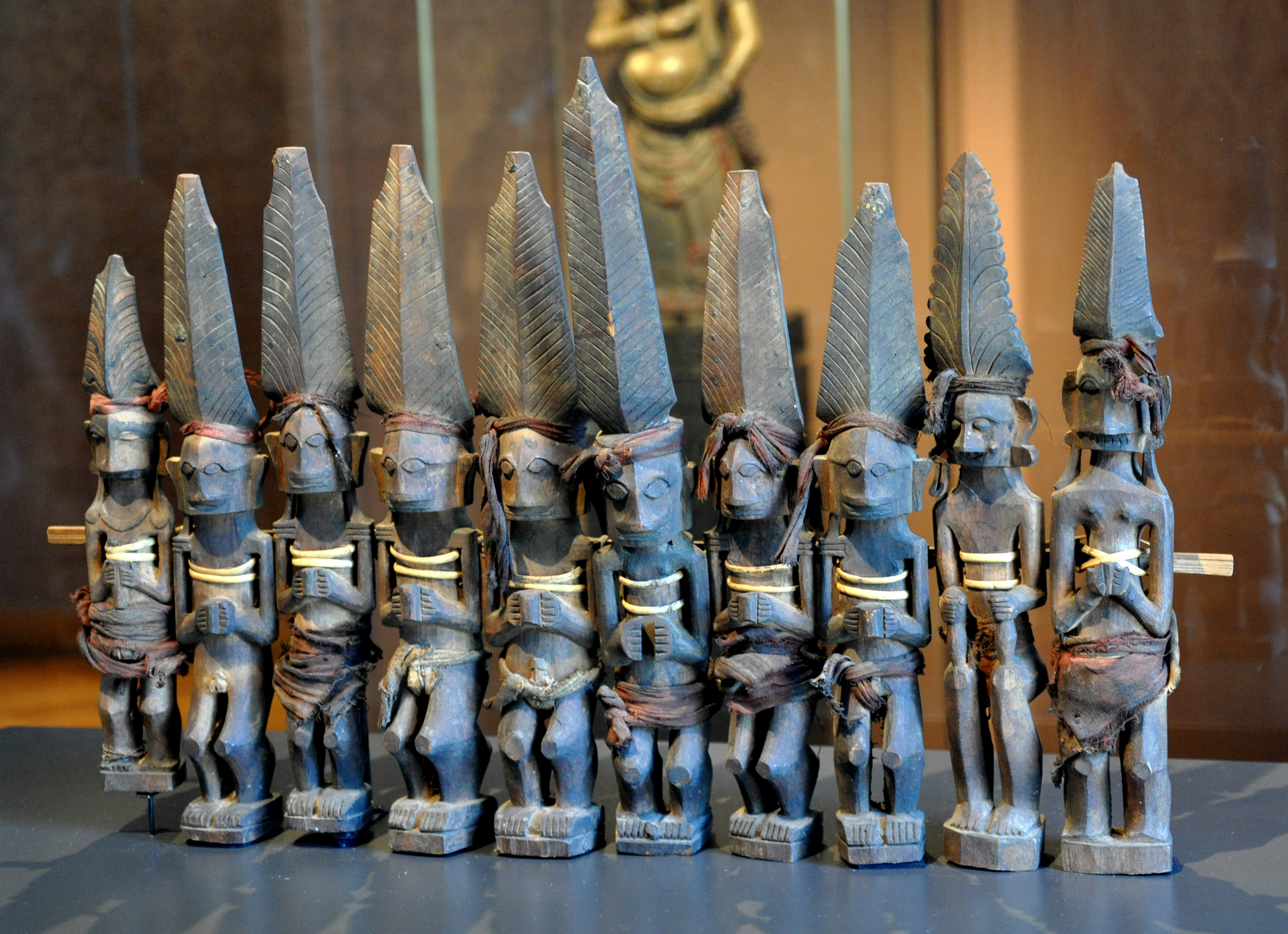
Adu Zatua statues from Nias

Nias island, together with groups of other islands off the western coast of Sumatra, was mentioned by Ptolemy in 150 CE as "Barus islands". Nias had well-established trade contacts with Arab and Chinese traders since around the seventh century. In 1154, the island was mentioned by Muhammad al-Idrisi as "Niyan" and described as "densely populated, with one big town, and inhabited by many tribes".

Archeological evidence shows humans have inhabited the island for 12,000 years. Remains of tools were found in Tögi Ndrawa cave by Indonesian archeologists from Medan in August 1999. The excavation shows sign of Mesolithic culture and that the cave was still inhabited until around 700 years ago. According to folk stories of the Nias people, the island was settled by six ancestor tribes but the current Nias people or Ono Niha—which means "human" in the Nias language—arose more recently, according to records compiled by German missionary Wilhelm Heinrich Sundermann. Migration of Ono Niha people from mainland Sumatra occurred in around 1350; they brought with them knowledge of metallurgy, agriculture, husbandry, and woven clothing. It is unknown whether previous inhabitants of the island were assimilated or out-competed with the arrival of the Ono Niha.

In 1416, Ming treasure voyages led by Zheng He occupied a portion of mainland Sumatra that directly faces Nias island and constructed a port town named Singkuang (New Land). The occupation led to a significant presence of Chinese communities on the island. Around the 1500s, the island was subject to frequent slave raids by ships from Aceh Sultanate, which at the time was under Sultan Ali Mughayat Syah, who sought to conquer the western coast of Sumatra. In 1642, seven ships from Aceh Sultanate were stranded on the eastern coast of the island, resulting in a significant presence of Acehnese communities, which are known locally as Polem people.

=== Contact with Europeans ===
First contact between Nias people and Europeans came on 2 July 1664 when Dutch traders and the king of Luaha Laraga made a trade agreement and tariffs for Dutch ships that were using the port in modern-day Idanoi district. In 1668, the Dutch East India Company made agreements with village chiefs around the location of modern-day Gunungsitoli city and the Hinako islands. The company settled the region and built several warehouses but the Dutch traders left the region and abandoned the settlement in 1740 due to decreasing Dutch influence over the region.

=== Colonial era ===
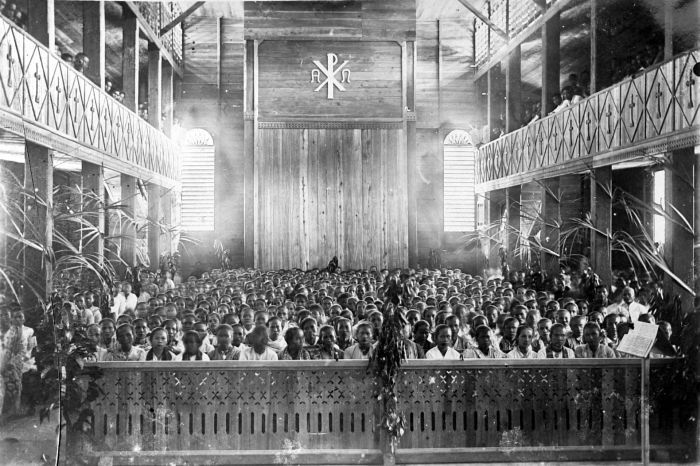
A church scene in Gunungsitoli, around 1900

In 1776, British traders tried to settled the region but soon also abandoned it because the region was not profitable. For several decades, there was no significant European presence on the island. The British again tried to settle the region in 1821 but the settlement was taken over by the Dutch in 1825. In 1840, the Dutch tried to gain control of the entire island following the Anglo-Dutch Treaty of 1824 but were unable to establish a military presence on the island outside of a small area of Gunungsitoli, which was then known as Rapatgebied. Frequent raids by Nias tribes against Dutch fortifications concentrated the settlement in the area that would become the city.

The Dutch were only able to start a significant military campaign against Nias tribes in 1900 and subjugated the entire island by 1914. Nias was one of the last regions of the Indonesian archipelago by to be conquered by the Dutch East Indies. Missionary activities on the island grew after the Dutch established control over the island. In 1916, a mass conversion to Christianity known as Fangesa Sebua (The Great Repentance) occurred on the island. The event started in Gunungsitoli from Idanoi and later spread throughout the island.

=== Mid-to-late 20th century ===
Gunungsitoli was one of two locations on Nias where Dutch authorities held German prisoners during World War II. The prisoners were formerly part of a larger German prisoner group aboard the SS Van Imhoff, which was sunk by Japanese bombers off the west coast of Sumatra. Upon hearing news about Japanese attacks on Sumatra, the German prisoners planned a coup against the Dutch colonial authority in the city. The prisoners tried to persuade native police, known as Veldpolities, to revolt. At the time, the city was home to around 60 German prisoners. On 29 March 1942, the native police revolted by shooting Dutch residents and imprisoning Dutch officials, and the city was quickly occupied. Once occupied German prisoners established the unrecognized state of the Free Republic of Nias. On 17 April 1942, the Japanese military landed in the city and was welcomed by the German prisoners, who took over the city. By 24 April 1942, all German prisoners had left the island and the administration was handed over to the Japanese until the end of World War II.

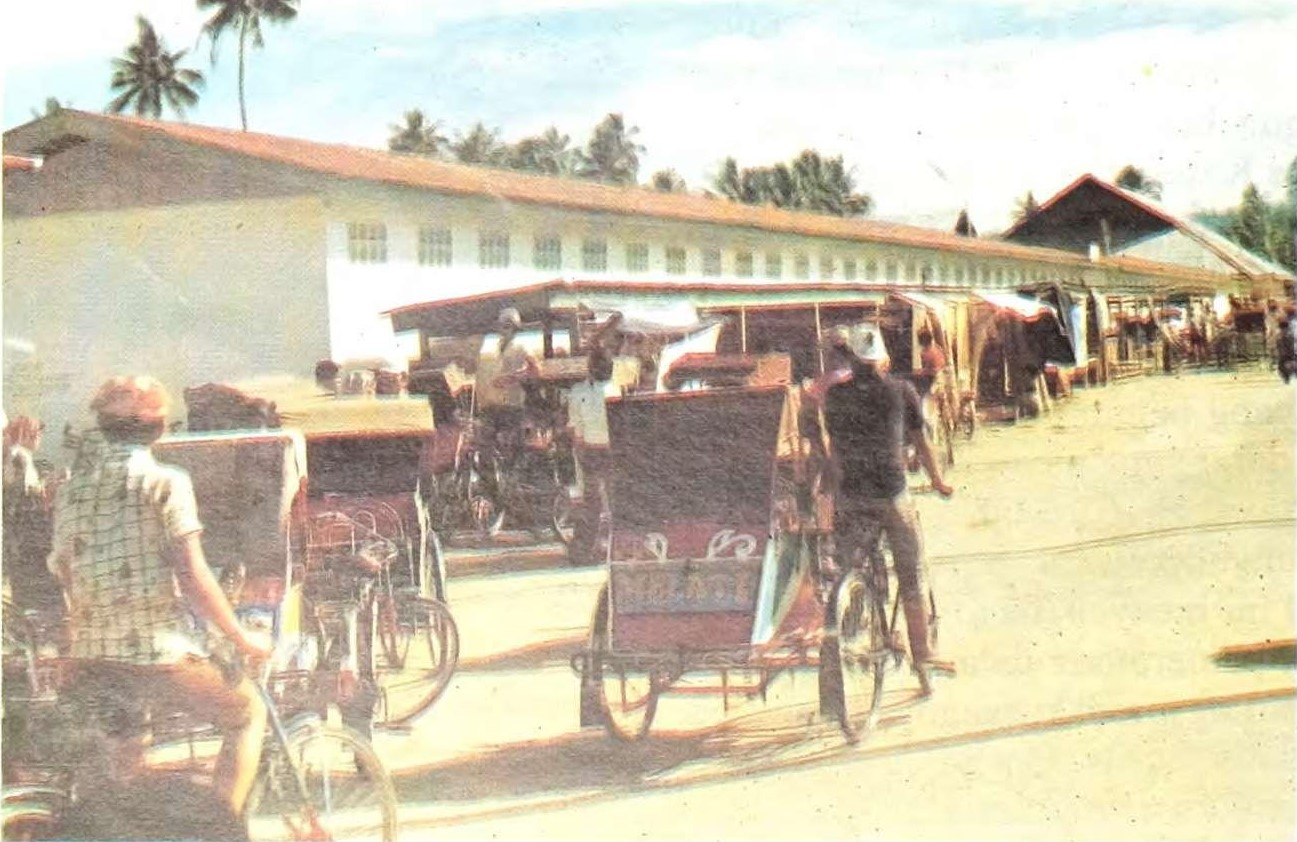
Beringin Market in Gunungsitoli, 1975. In 1975, the city and Nias island seen a short-lived tourist boom followed by brief improvement of infrastructures.

During the Indonesian National Revolution, Gunungsitoli and Nias came under blockade from the Dutch Navy to cut off the island from the western coast of Sumatra. Due to the blockade, the city printed its own banknotes because Republican banknotes from Bukittinggi could not be transported. The banknotes were known as ORIPDA-Nias (Regional Money of Republic Indonesia-Nias). The Dutch military landed in the city in November 1945. The relationship between the newly arrived troops and the city's residents was tense, especially because of constant patrols of Republican youths armed with bambu runcing. Small armed clashes occurred around the city when Dutch military tried to take back control of governmental buildings that were taken over by Indonesian nationalists following the end of the war.

The republican government of Nias was evacuated from Gunungsitoli in the aftermath. In November 1946, the Indonesian National Committee or (Komite Nasional Indonesia) (KNI) led by Roos Telaumbanua attempted to establish armed elements of Republicans such as a branch of the People's Security Agency and the Indonesian National Police around the island. The committee also established a Fonds Kemerdekaan (Independence Fund) to give economic support to the Indonesian republic in Tapanuli, mainland Sumatra, and Kongsi Pelajaran (Shipping Union). The economic support was in form of the sale of copra to Singapore and donating pigs and oil to Tapanuli. Gunungsitoli was one of the main centers of Republican support on the island. Due to Operation Kraai, communication between Nias and Tapanuli was cut off so the island tried to establish communication with Kutaraja, Aceh. On 19 November 1949, officials from North Sumatra visited Gunungsitoli to establish a local government council (Dewan Pemerintah Daerah) on Nias, which was realized in 1950.

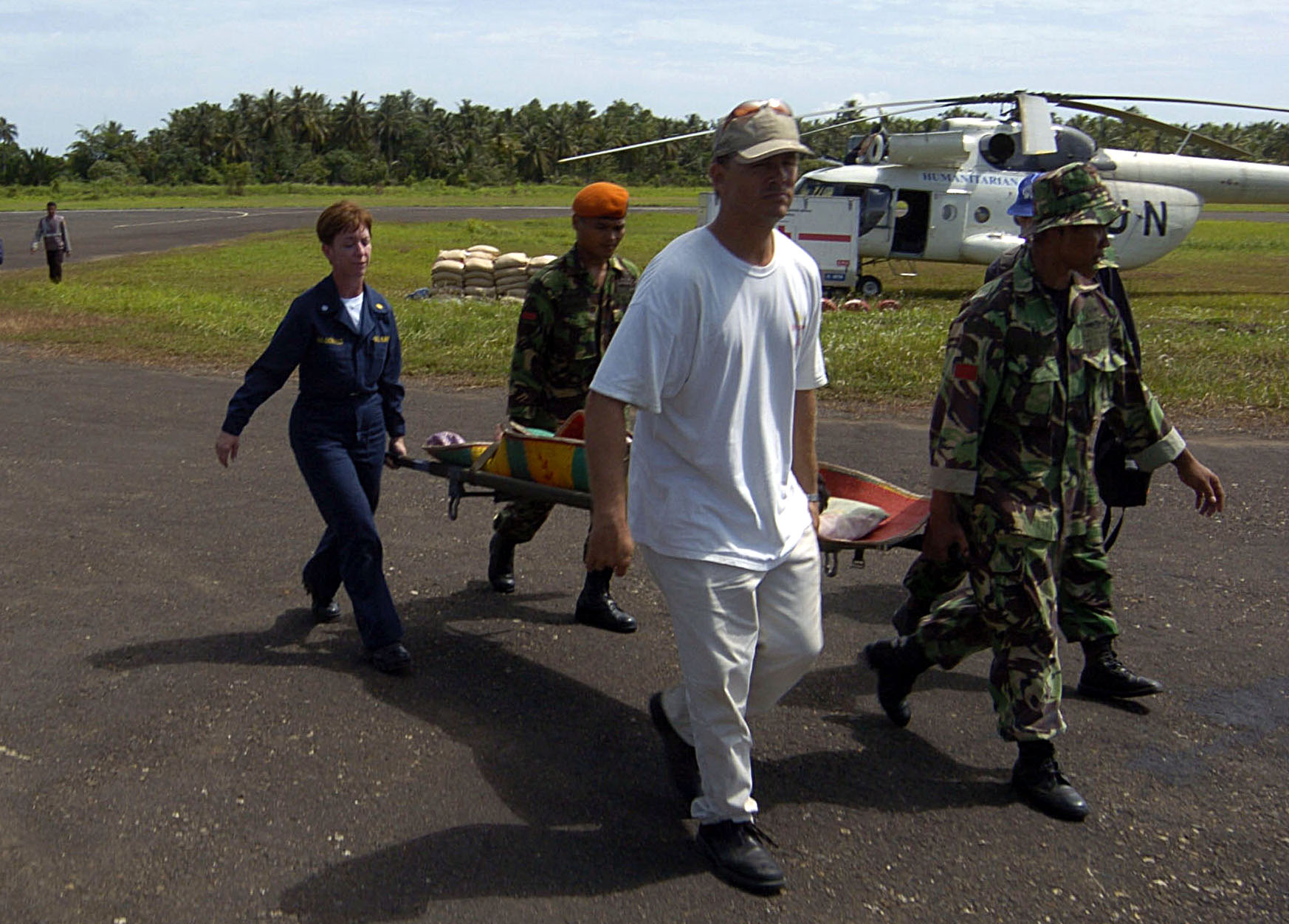
US Navy together with Indonesian Army on Binaka Airport in the aftermath of 2005 Nias earthquake

In 1975, Nias experienced a tourist boom, especially with Australian tourists, and became destination for surfers. The tourist boom was followed by general improvements to infrastructure in Gunungsitoli and the building of markets and roads. Despite these improvements the boom was short-lived.

=== 21st century ===
Nias, including Gunungsitoli, was devastated by the 2004 Indian Ocean earthquake and tsunami and the 2005 Nias–Simeulue earthquake. Much of the infrastructure was destroyed, and between 2005 and 2010, the residents became reliant on aid from nonprofit organizations to recover.

On 29 October 2008, Gunungsitoli was separated from Nias Regency and became an independent city based on Law Number 47. Following decentralization and becoming an independent city, Gunungsitoli has seen the highest average economic growth in North Sumatra with 6% in 2018 and 6.05% in 2019. The city's infrastructure has been improved and development of the tourist industry has been a particular focus of both local and central government. In 2019, Gunungsitoli, together with other regencies on Nias, hosted Sail Nias, which is an annual yacht tournament and part of the Sail Indonesia event.

Gunungsitoli has been proposed as the capital of the newly proposed Nias Islands Province, which is projected to be separated from North Sumatra. As of 2023, however, the creation of the new province and other proposed new provinces and regencies has been halted due to the COVID-19 pandemic which put strain on government budgets, as well as by a government moratorium since 2013 on the creation of new provinces and regencies.

== Geography ==
Gunungsitoli borders North Nias Regency in the north, Nias Regency in the south and west, and the Indian Ocean in the east. The city has many hills with heights of up to 800 meters (2,600 ft) above sea level. The city's soil is mostly unstable, and often causes landslides and damage to roads. Soil composition varies from alluvium and limestone to corals and is generally prone to compaction. Limestone often makes underground water undrinkable.

The slope in the city interior varies from 8% to 25%. Coastal areas are mostly flatter with a slope of less than 8%. Gunungsitoli is located between the subduction zone of the Eurasian Plate and Indo-Australian Plate, making it extremely prone to earthquakes. The city was devastated by the 2005 Nias–Simeulue earthquake. According to the Meteorology, Climatology, and Geophysical Agency, on average, Gunungsitoli experiences more than 300 earthquakes per month. Due to its coastal location, the city is also prone to tsunamis.

=== Climate ===
Gunungsitoli is located close to the equator, and has a tropical rainforest climate with an average of 21 days of rain per month. The average rainfall per month in 2019 was 250.21 mm^{3} but this can vary widely from 100 and 300 mm^{3} per month. Moisture in the city is usually between 87% and 95%, and the average temperature is 26 °C (79 °F). Wind speed on average per month reaches 5.17 knots (2.66 m/s) per hour.

== Demographics ==
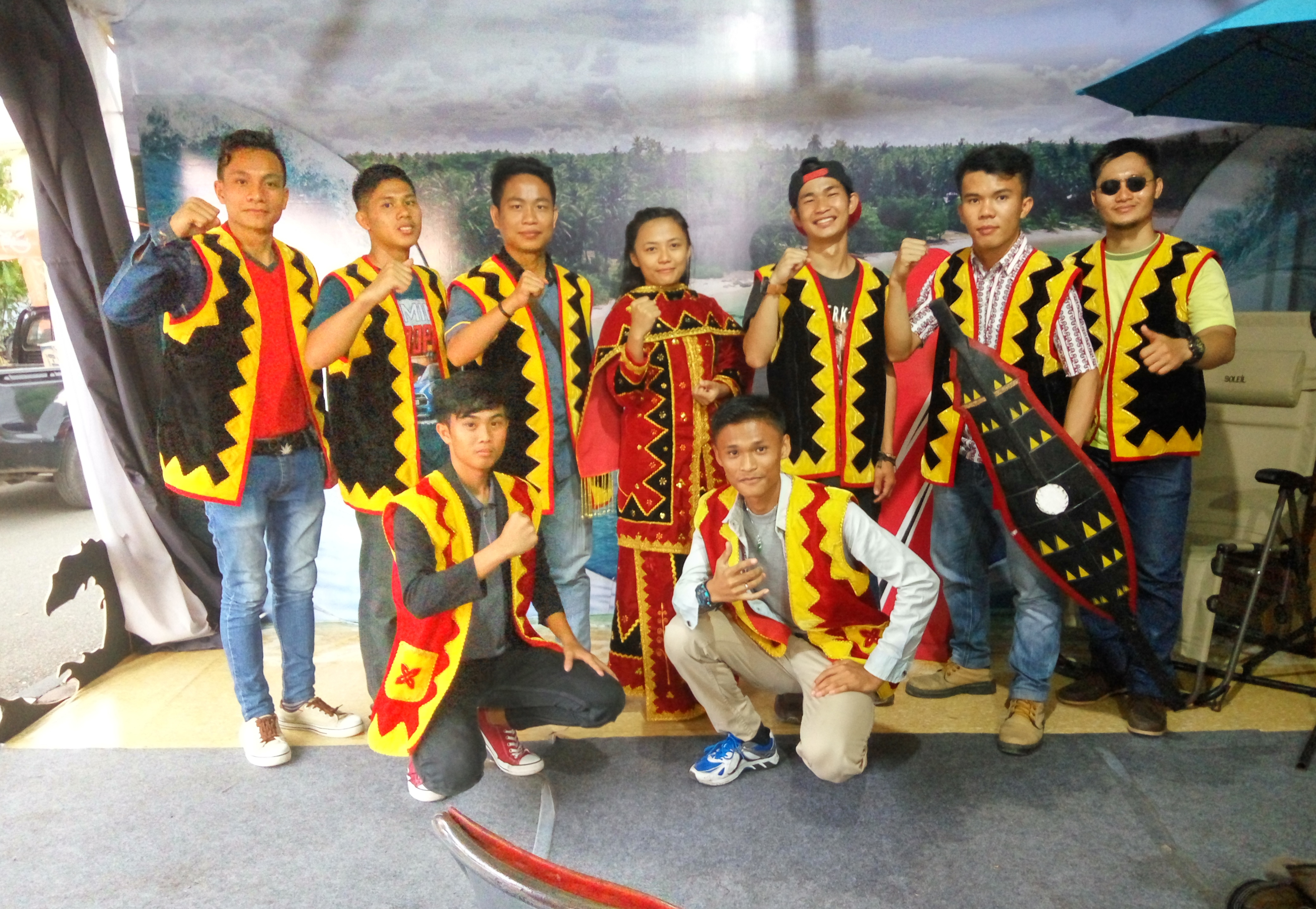
Nias traditional attire. Nias people are the majority of the city's inhabitants.

The average annual population growth in Gunungsitoli between 2020 and 2024 was 1.75%, with a sex ratio of 95.5 males to 100 females. As with other Indonesian cities, the population is young, with 93,655 of the total population of 145,233 between the ages of 15 and 65, of reproductive age and considered part of the workforce. In 2024, 46.3% of the city population lived in Gunungsitoli District. Despite the high birthrate and expansive structure of its population pyramid, the population growth was slow because of internal migration to bigger cities such as Padang and Medan.

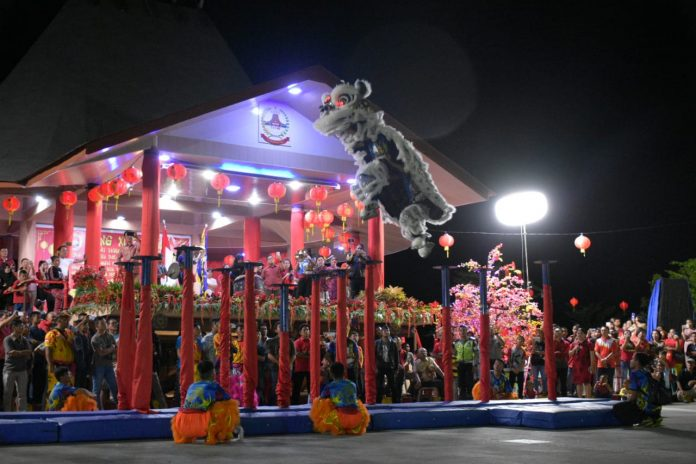
Cap Go Meh festival celebrated by Chinese Indonesians in Gunungsitoli, February 2020. The city has significant population of Chinese Indonesians.

The majority of the city's population is Protestant with a minority of Muslims, Catholics, and Buddhists. The Protestant population was 116,435 in 2020, followed by 21,979 Muslims, 10,363 Catholics and 382 Buddhists. The majority of city's residents are Nias people, and there are significant minorities of other ethnicities such as Batak, Minangkabau, Javanese, Chinese Indonesians and Acehnese people. The Chinese population are mainly descendants of traders in the precolonial era while the Acehnese people, who are found mostly around Mudik village on Idanoi, are descendants from Acehnese ships' crews. Most of the Acehnese and Chinese population have been assimilated into Nias society and can fluently speak the Nias language. There were historically populations of Bugis people, especially around the region close to the Hinako Islands, who were killed by raids from Acehnese ships during the precolonial era. Other ethnicities are known by Nias people as "Orang Seberang" (Indonesian: people from across).

Most people in the city speak the Nias language, which is also taught at schools as a regional language. Indonesian is also well-understood in the city.

== Governance ==
=== Administrative districts ===
Gunungsitoli has an area of 469.36 km^{2} (115,981.4 acres; 181.2 sq mi) comprising 0.63% of North Sumatra province. The city is divided into six districts (kecamatan), which are tabulated below with their areas and their populations at the 2010 and the 2020 Censuses, together with the official estimates as of mid-2024. The table also includes the location of the district administrative centres, the number of administrative villages in each district (totaling 98 rural desa and 3 urban kelurahan - the latter all in Gunungsitoli District), and its postal code.

Kode Wilayah	Name of District (kecamatan)	Area in km^{2}	Pop'n Census 2010	Pop'n Census 2020	Pop'n Estimate mid 2024	Administrative centre	No. of villages	Post code
12.78.04	Gunungsitoli Idanoi	134.78	21,482	23,674	25,491	Dahana	26	22870
12.78.02	South Gunungsitoli	56.85	13,739	14,806	15,805	Ononamolo I Lot	15	22851
12.78.06	West Gunungsitoli	28.70	7,436	8,007	8,544	Tumori	9	22811
12.78.01	Gunungsitoli	109.09	60,625	63,655	67,269	Mudik	32 ^{(a)}	22810
12.78.05	Gunungsitoli Alo'oa	60.21	6,708	7,781	8,547	Nazalou Alo’oa	9	22851
12.78.03	North Gunungsitoli	79.73	16,212	18,094	19,578	Afia	10	22851
	Totals	469.36	126,202	136,017	147,516		101	

Note: (a) including the 3 kelurahan (with populations in mid 2024) of Ilir (9,585), Pasar Gunungsitoli (4,864) and Saombo (2,997).

=== Local government ===
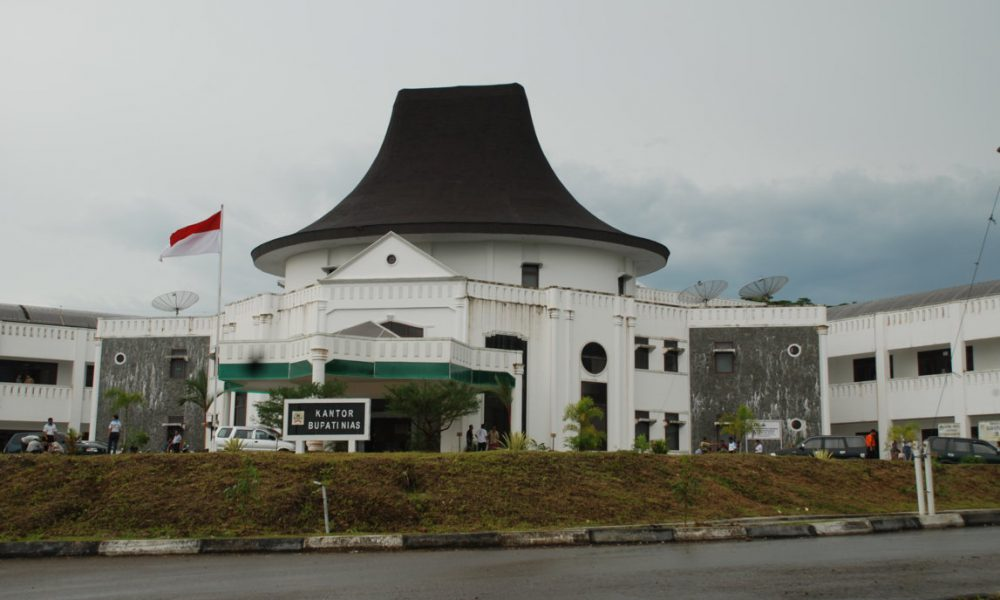
Nias Regent's office building in Gunungsitoli. The city was part of the Nias Regency until 2008.

Gunungsitoli People's Representative Council Dewan Perwakilan Rakyat Daerah Gunungsitoli

Type
- Type: Unicameral

History
- New session started: 30 October 2019

Structure
- Seats: 25
- Political groups: Indonesian Democratic Party of Struggle (6) NasDem Party (2) Perindo Party (2) Hanura (4) Demokrat (4) Golkar (2) PKPI (1) Gerindra (3) PAN (1)

Elections
- Voting system: Open list

As with all Indonesian cities, the local government of Gunungsitoli is a second-level administrative division that is run by a mayor and vice-mayor together with the City Council, and is equivalent in status to a regency. Executive power lies in the mayor and vice-mayor while legislation duties are carried on by the City Council. The Mayor, vice-mayor, and City Council members are democratically elected by the city's residents. Heads of districts are directly appointed by the city mayor on the recommendation of the city secretary.

=== Politics ===
On a provincial level, Gunungsitoli is part of the eighth electoral district of North Sumatra province together with the Nias, South Nias, North Nias, and West Nias Regencies (i.e. the entire Nias Island), which together have six representatives in the provincial parliament. On the city level, it is divided into three electoral districts and the City Council consists of 25 representative members overall.

Electoral district	Districts (kecamatan)	No. of Members
Gunungsitoli 1st	Gunungsitoli	11
Gunungsitoli 2nd	Gunungsitoli Idanoi, South Gunungsitoli, West Gunungsitoli	9
Gunungsitoli 3rd	North Gunungsitoli, Gunungsitoli Alo'oa	5
Total		25

== Economy ==
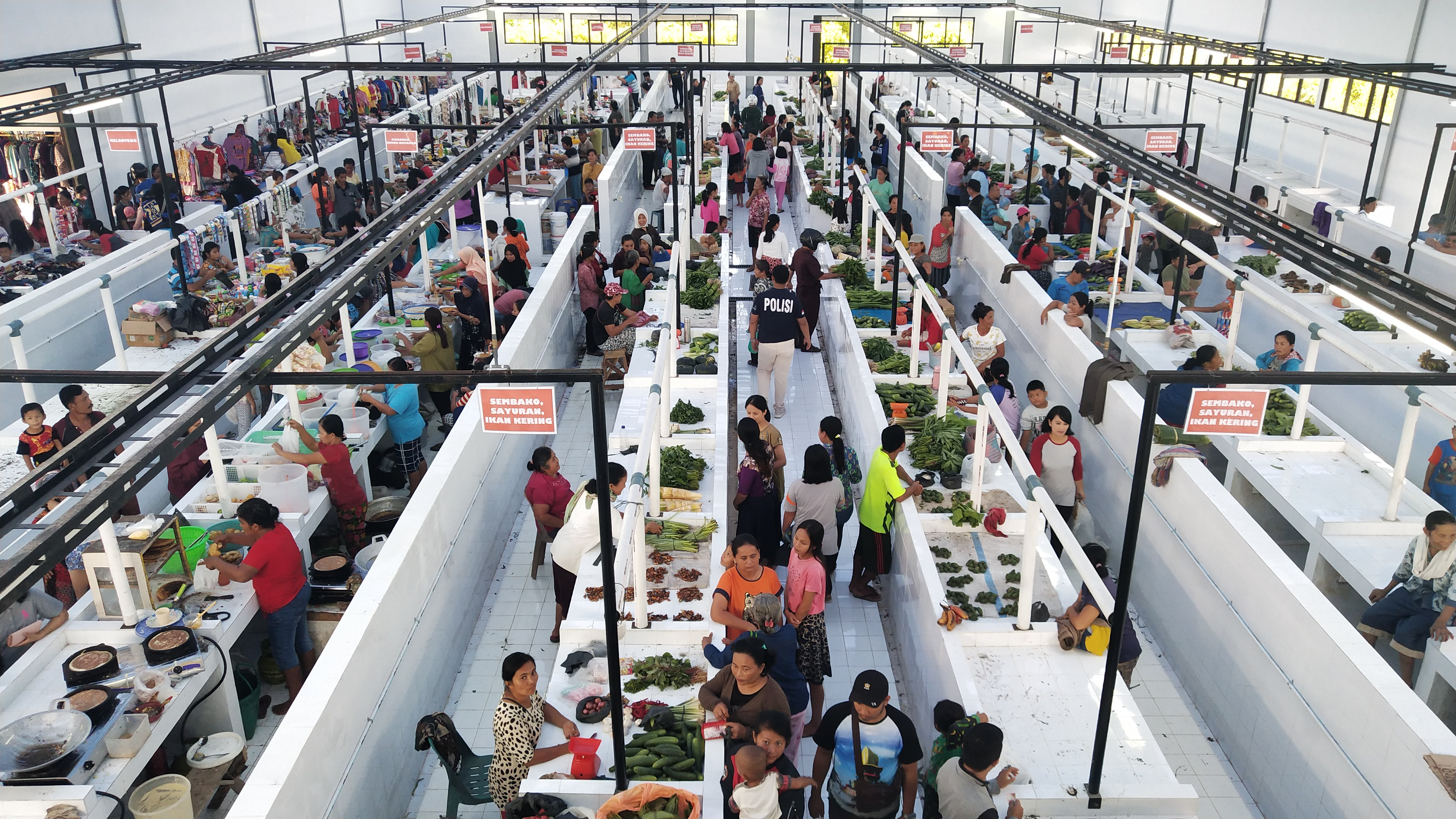
Market scene in Gunungsitoli. Trade dominates the city's economic activities

The biggest contributor to Gunungsitoli's gross regional product is the trade sector with a figure of 25.49%, followed by construction with 21.82%, and fisheries and agriculture with 14.6%. Economic growth was 6.05% in 2019. The city's gross regional product (GRP) in 2021 was 5,776.11 billion rupiahs, which was the second-highest in the island after South Nias Regency.

=== Agriculture and fisheries ===
Despite it being smaller than other sectors in terms of contribution to the GRP, agriculture employs around 31% of the city's workforce. In 2019, 2,313 ha (5,715.5 acres; 8.9 sq mi) of the city was cultivated for paddy with a crop yield of 12,997 tons. Copra is among the island's main exports and is shipped from Gunungsitoli after being harvested from neighbouring regencies. Other cultivated crops in Gunungsitoli are maize with a crop yield of 655.54 tons, cassava with 1,456 tons, and sweet potatoes with production of 634.25 tons. Most of the city's population planted cassava without harvesting it, and instead used its leaves to feed pigs. The pig population in Gunungsitoli as of 2020 was 2,699. The city's egg production was 268 tons in 2020. The same year's fish catch was 6,284 tons from the sea and 129 tons of freshwater fish.

=== Industry ===
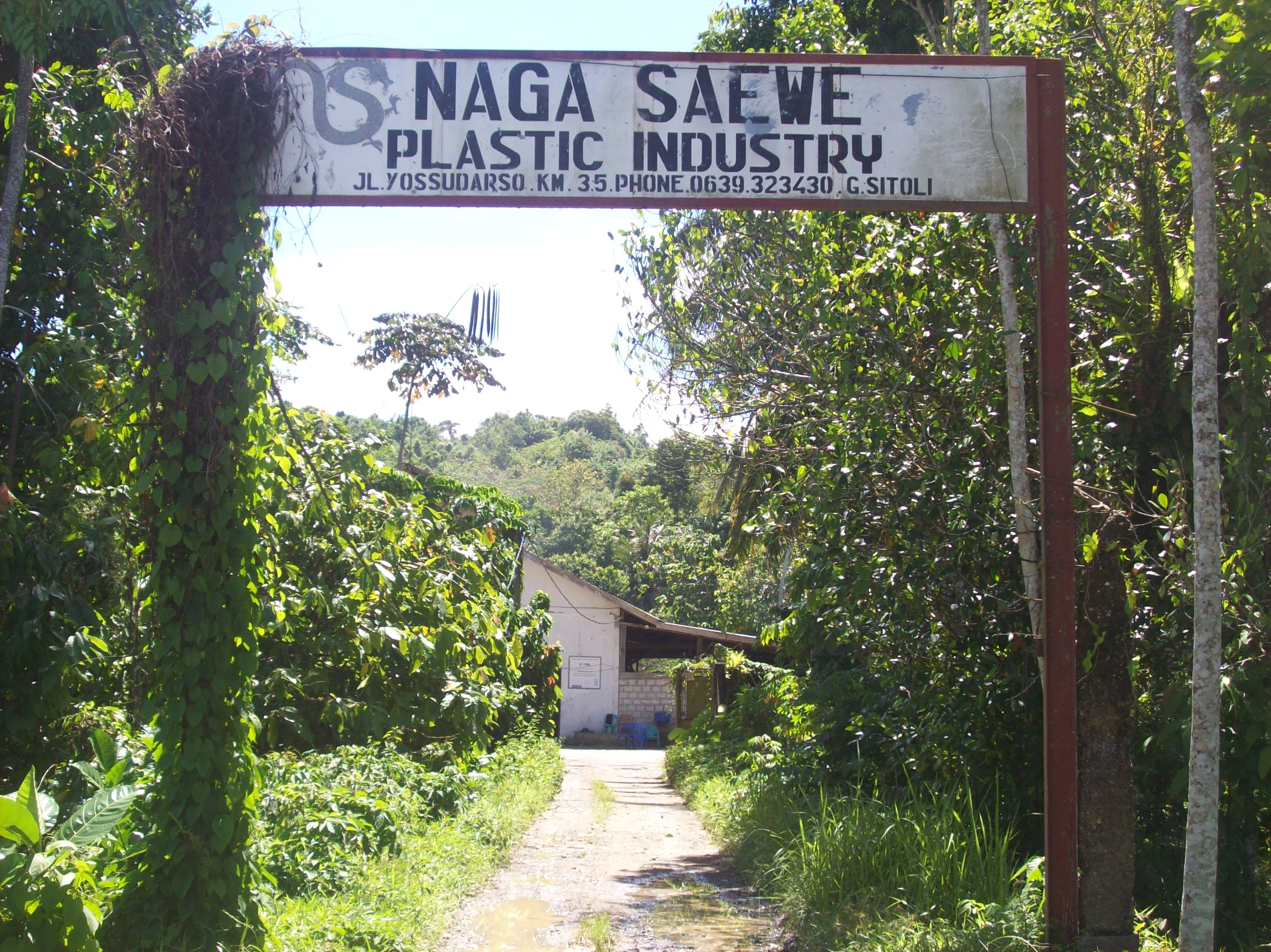
Plastic packaging factory in Gunungsitoli

North Gunungsitol hosts the only shipyard on Nias. The shipyard was built in 2017 and started operating in 2019, mostly repairing and painting ships. The city government runs an ice factory mainly to support the city's fisheries. The factory has the capability to produce around 300 blocks of ice per day. Other industries in the city include production of foods for livestock. Gunungsitoli has significant tofu industry; tofu is produced from soybeans from other regions such as Sibolga. Other processed products in the city includes dodol with durian flavour, which is Nias' signature dish; furniture products, and taro-related products.

There are also fisheries-related industries such as fish processing and production of canned fish.

=== Tourism ===
Gunungsitoli is the main gateway to Nias and a hub for tourists before reaching their destinations elsewhere on the island. According to the city government, there are 110 tourist spots inside the city. Despite the decline of the tourist industry following earthquakes, there are still significant international tourist visits, mostly by Australians. Tourist potential includes Nias culture, as well as beaches and natural spots such as cave and waterfalls. In 2019, 64,767 tourists—mostly domestic—visited the city. The tourist sector is supported by 23 hotels in the city as of 2019.

=== Finance ===
There are several banks in Gunungsitol such as North Sumatra Bank, Bank Rakyat Indonesia, Bank Negara Indonesia, Bank Mandiri, and Bank Danamon. There are also several insurance companies—mostly state-owned—such as Jiwasraya and Putra Muda. The finance sector contributed 3.29% to the city's GRP as of 2021.

== Infrastructure ==
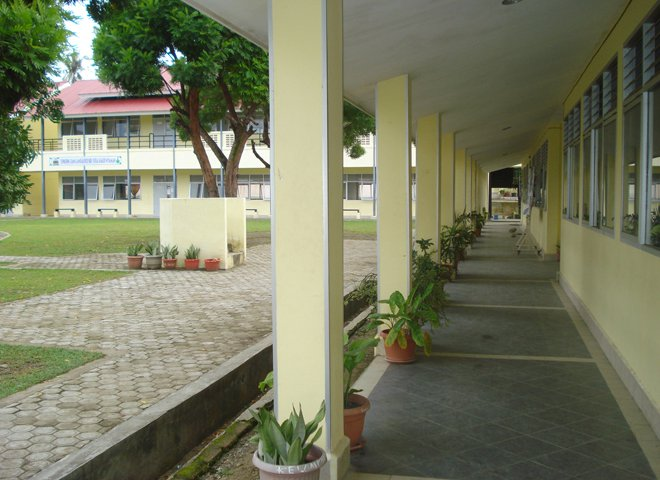
A highschool in Gunungsitoli

As of 2020, Gunungsitol had 28 kindergartens, 105 elementary schools, 35 junior high schools, and 12 senior high schools, in addition to 14 vocational high schools and six higher education institutions. In late 2021, several higher colleges and schools merged to form Nias Raya University. It is the island's first university and its main campus is located in South Nias Regency.

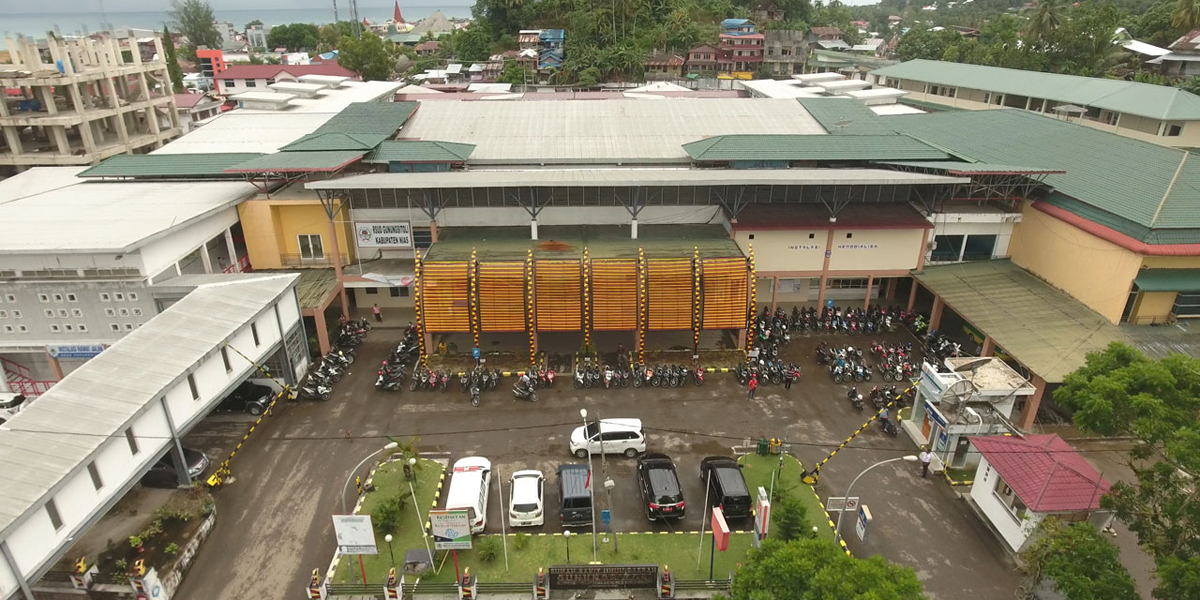
M. Thomsen Regional Hospital, main hospital of the region

There were four hospitals, nine polyclinics, six puskesmas, 20 healthcare centers, and six pharmacies. The city's main public hospital is Dr. M. Thomsen Regional Hospital, which is named after a Christian missionary and doctor who operated in the region during the colonial era. Previously, it was named Gunungsitoli Regional Hospital. The hospital is operated by the Nias Regency government because the city was previously part of that regency. It underwent an expansion in early 2021.

Convenience store chains such as Alfamart and Indomaret opened shops in Gunungsitoli in mid-2020. This received harsh criticism and rejection from many locals. Incumbent mayor Lakhomizaro said he was threatened by an unknown person when attending a Christmas celebration in the city's main church because he had issued convenience store permits.

Gunungsitoli's internet connectivity is mostly provided by Telkomsel though both cellular and fiber optic for its service IndiHome. The fiber optic service is available in Gunungsitoli, South Gunungsitoli, and Gunungsitoli Idanoi districts. Other providers in the city are XL Axiata and Indosat. As of 2019, all the providers are in 4G.

== Landmarks ==
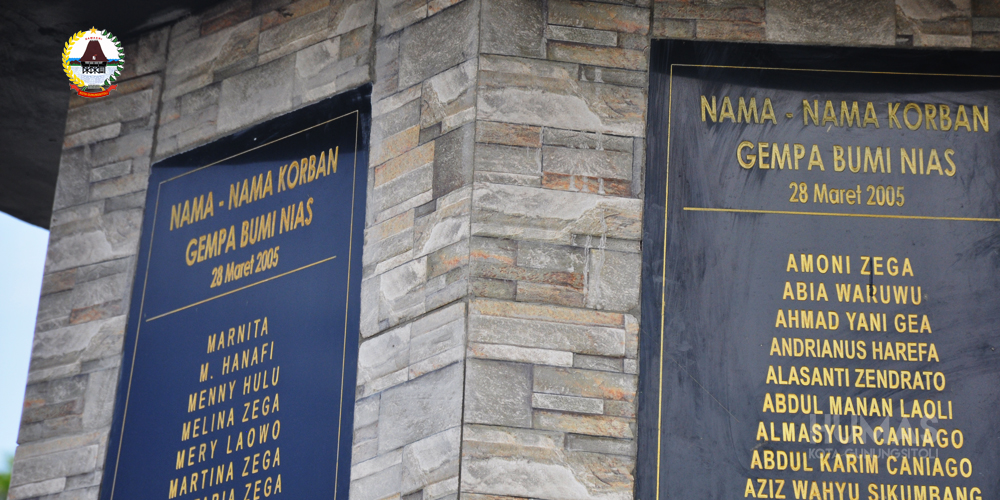
Name of Nias Earthquake victims written on the Nias Earthquake Monument

Gunungsitoli has a number of public parks, including Ya'ahowu Park located in Jl. Saompo, a coastal area of the city. The park is often used as place for cultural events and other celebrations such as Indonesian Independence Day, Christmas, and Nias Festival. Ya'ahowu Park was built on the ruins of houses that were destroyed in the aftermath of the 2005 Nias earthquake. It was named after word "ya'ahowu" which roughly means "bless you" in Nias language, often used to greet each other. Around the park are monuments such as the Durian Monument and the Nias Earthquake Monument. Names of the victims from the 2005 earthquake are written on the monument to commemorate the disaster, and at the top is a piece of debris from the earthquake. Other parks such as Doa Bunda Maria Park and a heroes' cemetery also exist in the city.

There are also other monuments in the city such as the Salib Monument in the city's main market. The monument was built by the city government and inaugurated on 6 December 2020. In South Gunungsitoli district, there are historical buildings such as cemetery and former house of missionaries that spread Christianity on Nias, Jemaat Petrus Ombolata church, and a former dormitory building. These buildings are said by city's Department of Tourism and Culture to be more than 100 years old; they had deteriorated due to their age and were restored. The city government plans to turn the buildings into a religious tourism destination, in addition to being proposed to be cultural heritage property.

== Transportation ==
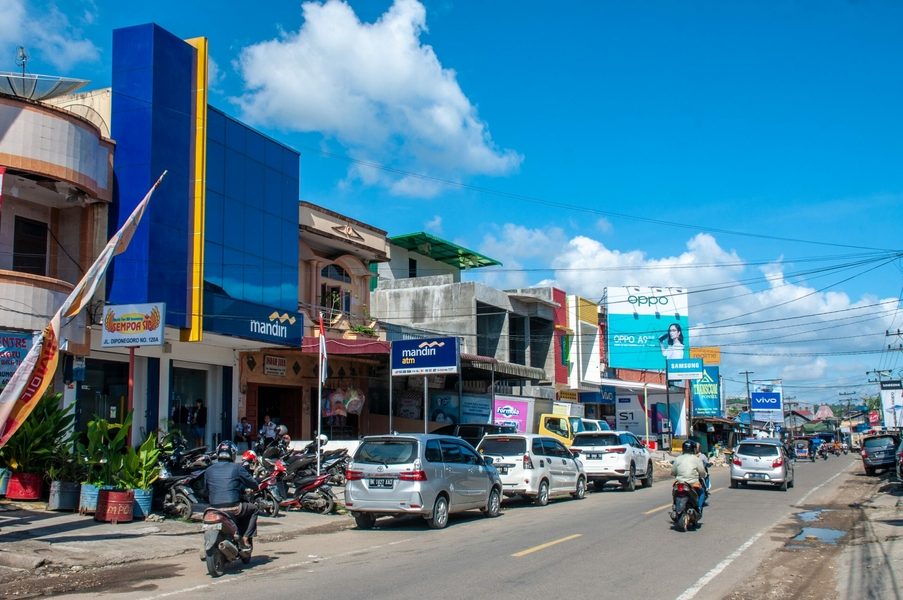
Road scene in Gunungsitoli

Gunungsitoli has 490.68 km (304.9 miles) of roads, most of which are paved with asphalt. Road quality varies, however, because of frequent earthquakes and poor soil condition. According to Statistics Indonesia, in 2019, more than 30% of city's roads were considered damaged. Gunungsitoli is served by Binaka Airport with regular flights to Medan and Jakarta.

The city has two ports; Angin Port and Roro Siwalubanua II Port, both of which provide service for passengers and container freight. There are regular ferry routes to Sibolga, Singkil, and Padang. The city is also served by Sea Toll Program, which has routes to Padang and Jakarta.

Like other Indonesian cities, Gunungsitoli has angkots (shared taxis), which are regulated by the city government and use Faekhu Passenger Terminal located at South Gunungsitoli. The terminal is intended both for angkot and buses. Perum DAMRI has a bus route to the town Telukdalam, South Nias.
