= North Nias Regency =

Regency in North Sumatra, Indonesia

North Nias Regency Kabupaten Nias Utara
- Regency
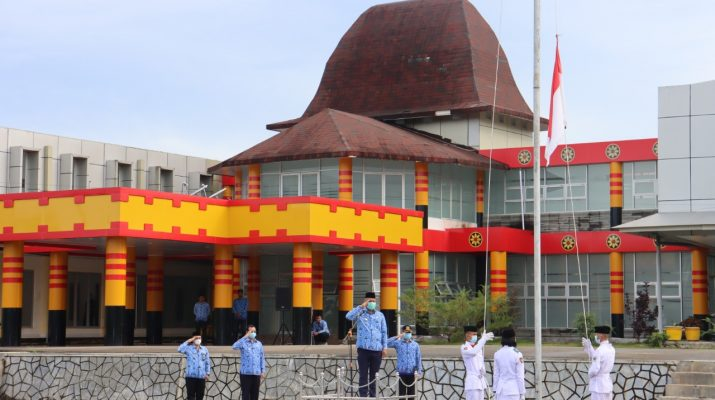
- North Nias Regent Office building in Lotu

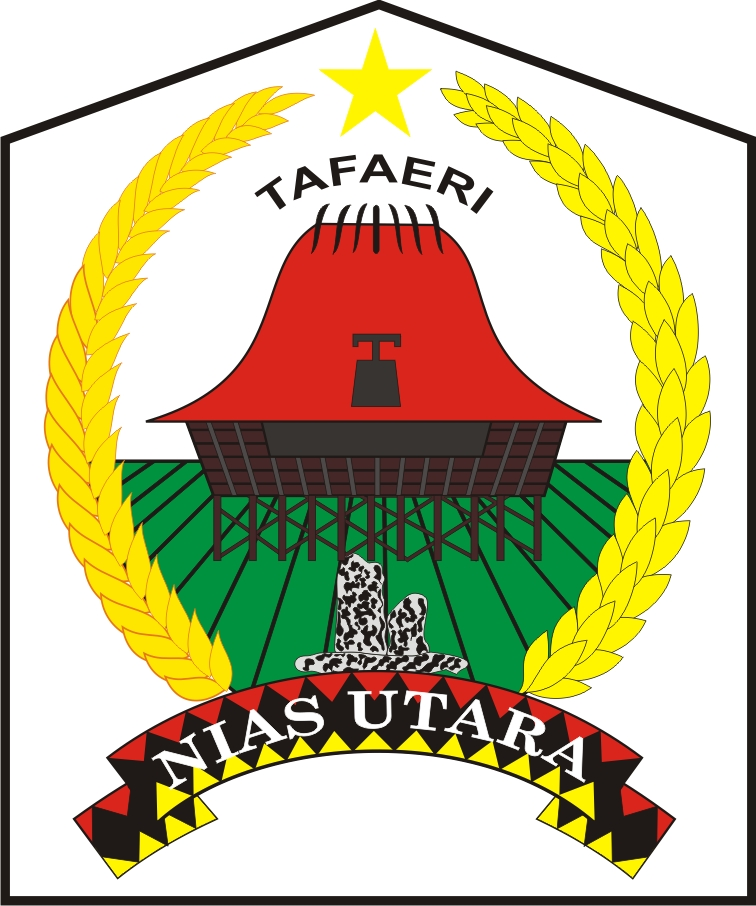
- Coat of arms
- Motto: Tafaeri
- Coordinates: 1.3875°N 97.3600°E
- Country: Indonesia
- Province: North Sumatra
- Regency seat: Lotu

Government
  - Regent: Amizaro Waruwu
  - Vice Regent: Yusman Zega

Area
  - Total: 1,520.54 km^{2} (587.08 sq mi)

Population (mid 2024 estimate)
  - Total: 158,676
  - Density: 104.355/km^{2} (270.278/sq mi)
- Time zone: UTC+7 (WIB)
- HDI (2022): ▲0.637 (Medium)
- Website: niasutarakab.go.id

North Nias Regency (Indonesian: Kabupaten Nias Utara) is located on Nias Island in the North Sumatra province of Indonesia. The regency was created on 29 October 2008 (along with neighbouring West Nias Regency) from several districts that had previously been part of Nias Regency. It occupies the northern portion of Nias Island and has an area of 1,520.54 square kilometres (587.1 sq mi). At the 2010 census, it had a population of 127,244, and 147,274 at the 2020 census; the official estimate of mid-2024 was 158,676 (comprising 78,862 males and 79,814 females). The regency's administrative capital is Lotu.

== History ==
North Nias Regency was once part of Nias Regency, from which it was split based on Law Number 45 in 2008. In 2018, parts of the regency's capital Lotu, including several government buildings, were demolished for the purpose of urban renewal. Haogosochi Hulu, vice regent of North Nias at that time, said the town "had a lot of developments but with no planning" and that some government buildings "need[ed] to be sacrificed for better planning".

== Geography ==
North Nias Regency borders Nias Regency and Gunungsitoli city in the east, West Nias Regency in the south, and the Indian Ocean in the north and the west. It includes 15 smaller islands, six of which are inhabited. North Nias Regency has rugged terrains with hills of up to 478 metres (1,568 ft) above sea level and includes 50 rivers and streams.

=== Climate ===
Being located close to the equator, North Nias experiences high rainfall with an average of 23 rainy days per month. Being surrounded by the Indian Ocean, the regency experience strong winds with an average speed of 5.4 knots (10.0 km/h) and frequent storms, which usually occur between September and November but occasionally in late August. The regency has an average temperature yearly of 26.4 degrees Celsius (79.5 °F) with a maximum average of 30.6 degrees Celsius (87.1 °F) and lowest average of 23.3 degrees Celsius (73.9 °F).

== Demographics ==
Most of the regency's population are Protestant Christians with minorities of Catholics and Muslims. In 2022, the distribution of religions was 85.2% Protestant, 9.8% Catholic, and 4.9% Muslim. The literacy rate was 95.74% in 2022, when the literacy rate for males was 98.12% and that for females was 93.45%.

== Economy ==
North Nias Regency's Gross regional domestic product (GRDP) was valued at Rp3,875.07 billion in 2021. The regency is mainly agrarian, with most industries—both in value and employment—dominated by farming, plantation, forestry, and fishing-related activities. Agriculture dominates the regency's economy at 52.25% in the same year, followed by trading and retail services at 11.91%, and the construction sector at 9.47%. Economic growth in 2021 was 2.02% compared to the previous year's figure of 1.58%.

=== Agriculture and fishery ===
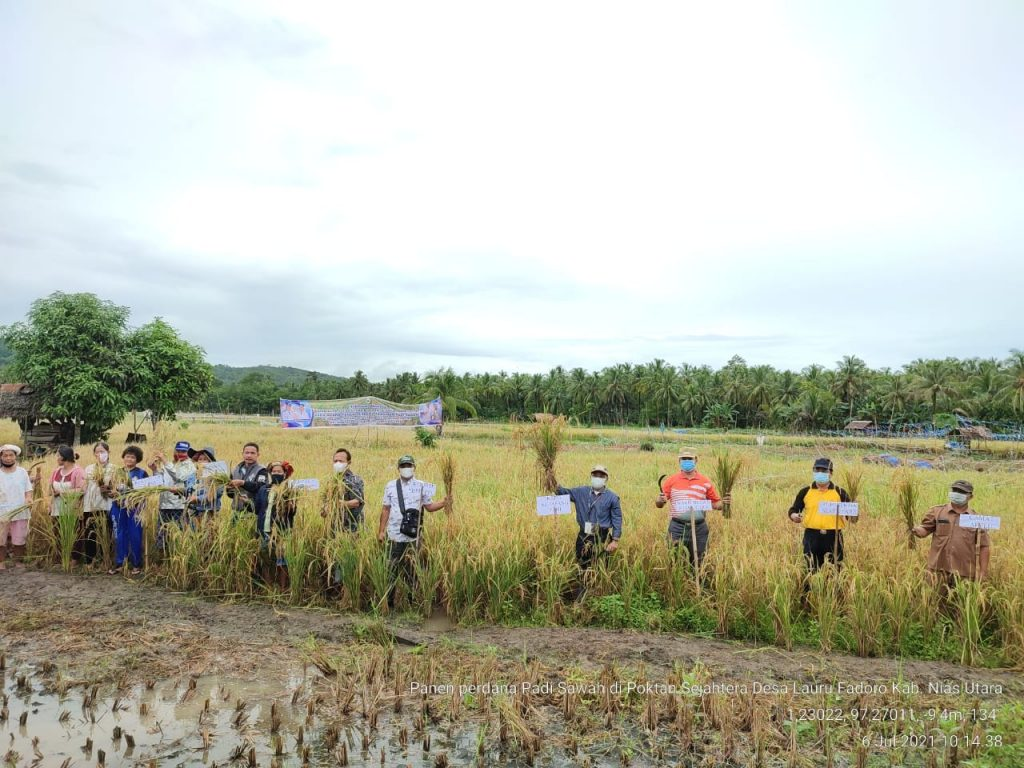
A paddy field in Afulu, North Nias

North Nias Regency's agriculture and fishery sector produces large, diverse outputs due to its fertile soil and being located on an island, many of its residents work as fishers. Alasa, Lotu, and Namohalu Esiwa are the main food-producing districts of the regency, mainly growing rice. The regency produced 51,194 tonnes of rice, from which Namohalu Esiwa produced 11,162 tonnes in 2022, followed by 10.945 tonnes from Lotu, and 6,435 tonnes from Alasa. Tehumberua, Lahewa, and Sawo districts are the regency's main fish-producing districts with respective fishery outputs of 4,550, 4,150, and 3,150 tonnes. The regency's other produce includes eggplants, chili, cabbages, and water spinach from Lahewa and East Lahewa.

A significant amount of the regency's land is used for plantations, mainly coconut with 13,325 hectares (32,930 acres) and rubber with 35,295 hectares (87,220 acres) in 2022. The regency produced 46,376 tonnes of dried coconuts and 42,529 tonnes of rubber in the same year.

The livestock owned in the regency consists mainly of pigs and chickens, with populations of 52,850 and 57,310 respectively in 2016.

=== Small, medium, and micro-enterprises ===
In 2016, the regency had 6,700 registered small, medium, and micro-enterprises, which is around 0.57% of the companies registered in North Sumatra. It is a decrease of around 25% from figures in 2006. Micro-scale enterprises made up 83.11% of the figures, followed by 14.87% of small-sized enterprises and 1.60% of medium-sized enterprises. Most of these small-scale companies are in the trade and retail sector. They employed 38% of the regency's workforce in 2016. Around 90% of all businesses in the regency are classified as informal businesses, while licensed businesses with legal entities only represent 4.47% of the regency's businesses.

== Governance ==
=== Administrative districts ===
North Nias Regency is divided into eleven districts (kecamatan), tabulated below with their areas (in km^{2}) and their populations at the 2010 Census, and 2020 Census, together with the official estimates as of mid-2024. The table also includes the locations of the district administrative centres, the number of administrative villages in each district (totaling 112 rural desa and just one urban kelurahan), and its postcode.

Kode Wilayah	Name of District kecamatan)	Area in km^{2}	Pop'n Census 2010	Pop'n Census 2020	Pop'n Estimate mid 2024	Admin centre	No. of villages	Post code
12.24.08	Tugala Oyo	154.48	6,094	6,873	6,986	Teolo	8	22860
12.24.07	Alasa	204.37	18,939	20,836	21,057	Ombolato	14	22861
12.24.06	Alasa Talu Muzoi	94.04	6,495	7,071	7,373	Hilimbowo Kare	6	22814
12.24.05	Namohalu Esiwa	150.39	12,158	14,838	15,348	Namohalu	11	22816 ^{(a)}
12.24.04	Sitolu Ori	78.81	11,409	13,447	13,707	Hilisaloo	6	22852
12.24.03	Tuhemberua	55.93	10,377	13,044	13,879	Silima Banua	8	22852
12.24.02	Sawo ^{(b)}	90.49	9,604	11,071	11,669	Sawo	10	22852
12.24.01	Lotu	110.11	11,139	13,614	14,721	Hilidundra	13	22856
12.24.11	Lahewa Timur (East Lahewa)	203.44	9,863	10,272	10,611	Lukhulase	7	22858
12.24.09	Afulu ^{(c)}	149.78	10,492	11,771	12,425	Afulu (village)	9	22857
12.24.10	Lahewa ^{(d)}	228.70	20,674	24,485	25,562	Pasar Lahewa ^{(e)}	21	22853
	Totals	1,520.54	127,244	147,274	158,676	Lotu	113	

Notes: (a) except the village of Sisobahili, with a post code of 22817. (b) including the offshore island of Pulau Sarangbaung.
(c) including the offshore island of Pulau Wunga. (d) including 17 offshore islands. (e) Pasar Lahewa is the regency's sole kelurahan.

== Infrastructure ==
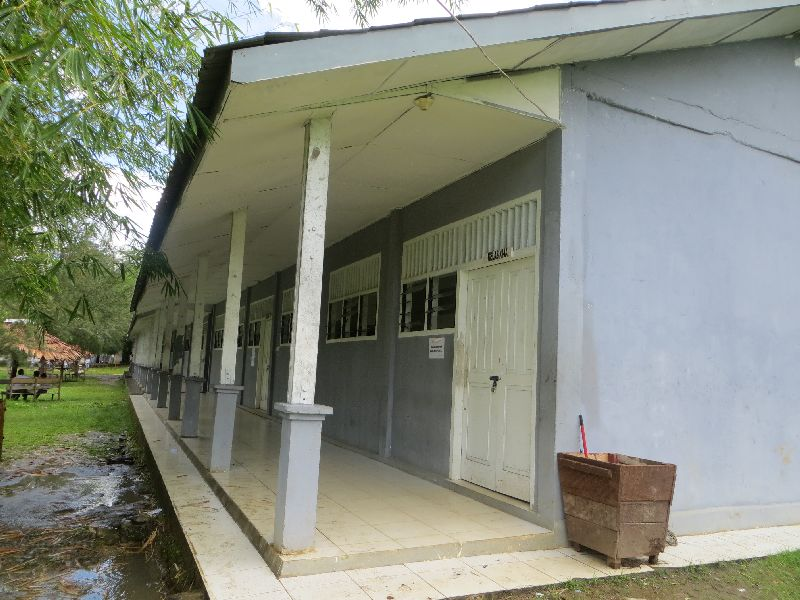
A school building in North Nias

Roads in North Nias Regency are maintained and managed by the regency government and have status as regency roads. Before 2022, there were no provincial or national roads in the regency but in 2022, a national road project connected Lahewa and Faekhuna'a with a length of around 16 kilometers (9.9 miles). The regency has 928.28 km (576.81 miles) of roads, of which 531 kilometers (330 miles) are paved with asphalt and in good condition, while the rest are not paved and considered in poor condition. The regency's ports include Lahewa seaport in Lahewa, from where regular ferries provide transportation to mainland Sumatra. The regency has no airport, the closest being Binaka Airport in Gunungsitoli.

Electricity in the regency is supplied by a diesel generator that is operated by Perusahaan Listrik Negara's Gunungsitoli branch, PLTD Muawo and PLTD Idanoi, both of which also serve Nias Island's other regencies. On 2016, the regency had 57 market locations, consisting of one major public market and 56 village markets. In the same year, there were 1,025 registered warung and other type of shops in the regency.

As of 2023, the regency has 15 kindergartens, 166 elementary schools, 49 junior high schools, 15 senior high schools, and 23 vocational high schools. The regency also has one community college. In 2020, a merger of the regency's community college was proposed and it became a campus of University of North Sumatra. The public North Nias Pratama Hospital, which the Ministry of Health considers a D-class hospital, is located in Lotu and is managed by the regency government. The regency also has 50 puskesmas, 57 village health clinics, and 199 healthcare centers. There is one registered pharmacy, which is also located in Lotu.

The regency has 30 mosques, 464 Protestant churches, and 116 Catholic churches.
