= Hinako Islands =

Indonesian islands

Coordinates: 0.833333°N 97.333336°E

The Hinako Islands are a group of small islands off the west coast of Nias Island in the Sirombu District of the West Nias Regency, which is part of the North Sumatra Province of Indonesia. They comprise Pulau Bawa, Pulau Hinako, Pulau Imana, Pulau Heruanga, Pulau Asu, Pulau Bogi, Pulau Hamutala and Pulau Langu. They comprise administratively the 12 villages (desa) of Bawosaloo, Imana, Tuwa Tuwa, Kafo Kafo, Bawasawa, Pulau Bogi, Halamona, Hanofa, Lahawa, Hinako, Sinene Eto and Balowondrate. Closer to the coast of Nias lie the offshore islands of Pulau Siite and Pulau Lawandra. All are part of Sirombu District (kecamatan) of West Nias Regency.

The waves at Bawa Island (Pulau Bawa) were revealed in magazine articles and a surf film in 1994, featuring surfers Tom Curren and Francis Desmond "Frankie" Oberholzer riding some of the biggest waves ever seen in Indonesia at that time filmed by Sonny Miller.
