= Nias =

Island off the west coast of Sumatra, Indonesia

Native name: Tanö Niha
- Interactive map of Nias

Geography
- Location: South East Asia
- Coordinates: 1°6′N 97°32′E
- Area: 5,345.056 km^{2} (2,063.738 sq mi)
- Highest elevation: 2,815 ft (858 m)
- Highest point: Lölömatua

Administration
- Indonesia
- Province: North Sumatra
- Regencies: Nias, South Nias, North Nias, West Nias
- Largest settlement: Gunungsitoli (pop. 145,233)

Demographics
- Population: 946,746 (mid 2024 estimate)
- Pop. density: 177.1/km^{2} (458.7/sq mi)
- Ethnic groups: Predominantly Nias; Others: Batak, Minang, Aceh and Chinese

Nias (/ˈniːəs/ NEE-əss; Indonesian: Pulau Nias [puˈlau ˈnias], Nias: Tanö Niha [ˈtanə ˈniha]) is an island located off the western coast of Sumatra, Indonesia. Nias is also the name of the archipelago (Kepulauan Nias) of which the island is the centre, but also includes the Batu Islands to the southeast and the small Hinako Islands to the west.

== Geography ==
Nias Island covers an area of 5,573.27 km^{2} (2,151.85 sq mi) (including the Batu Islands to the south and minor offshore islands). It is mostly a lowland area rising to around 800 m (2,600 ft) above sea level. There were 756,338 inhabitants on the island (including the Batu Islands and minor offshore islands) at the 2010 Census; at the 2015 Intermediate Census this had risen to 798,506 and the 2020 Census documented a total of 880,550. The official estimate as of mid-2024 was 946,746; it is officially projected to be 962,819 in mid 2025.

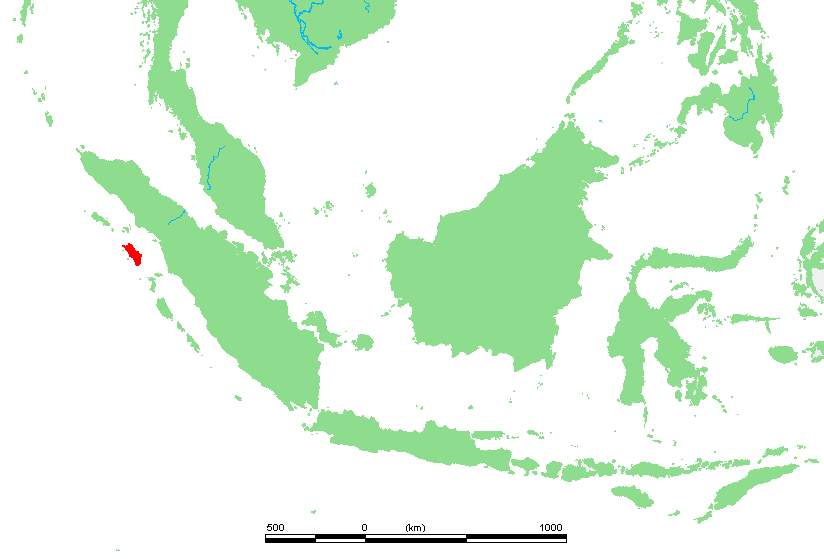
Location of Nias, Indonesia

It is located in a chain of islands parallel to the west coast of Sumatra; Simeulue is about 140 km (87 mi) northwest, and the Batu Islands (which are administered as part of Nias and have an ethnically similar population) are located about 80 km (50 mi) southeast; the chain is then followed in the Mentawai Islands further south. This chain, which resurfaces in Nusa Tenggara in the mountainous islands of Sumba and Timor, is the forearc of the South Sumatra Basin along the Sunda Trench subduction zone.

At Nias, the oceanic plate is being obliquely subducted under the Sunda Plate at the rapid rate of 52 mm (2.0 in) a year (Milsom).

== History ==
The first inhabitants of Nias were Australomelanesoid people which can be traced back as early as 10,000 BC. They were later superseded by the Austronesian people which ultimately originated from Taiwan. The name of the island derives from the word used by the islanders to refer to themselves, niha ("human"). In the local language (Li Niha), the island is called Tanö Niha (literally the land of humans).

=== World War II ===
During World War II, Nias was briefly occupied by an unrecognized Nazi state proclaimed by a group of escaped German prisoners calling themselves the Free Republic of Nias.

=== Tsunami and earthquakes of 2004 and 2005 ===
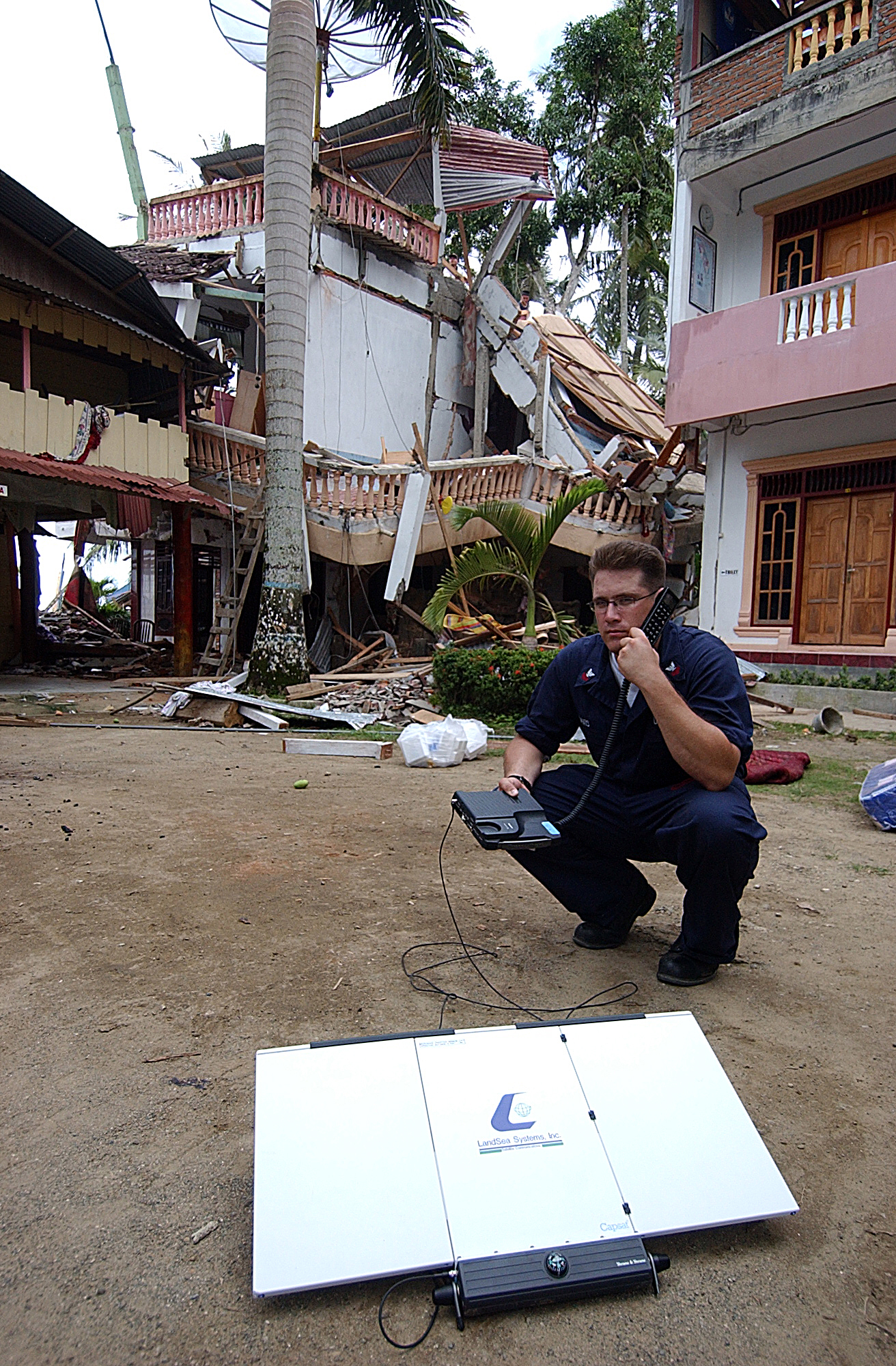
2005 Nias–Simeulue earthquake: U.S. Navy communicates with Military Sealift Command hospital ship USNS Mercy (T-AH-19) using Inmarsat satellite telephone in Nias (April 2005).

On 26 December 2004, the 2004 Indian Ocean earthquake struck a few kilometers north of the island, creating tsunamis as high as 10 m (33 ft). 122 people were killed and hundreds more were rendered homeless.

On 28 March 2005, the island was again hit by the 2005 Nias–Simeulue earthquake, initially presumed to be an aftershock of the 2004 quake, but now regarded as the second most powerful earthquake ever recorded in Indonesia and among the top 10 most powerful recorded worldwide since 1900. At least 800 people were reported dead, with the possibility of more than 2,000 casualties. Hundreds of buildings were toppled and many thousands of people were made homeless. In 2007, almost two years after the earthquake, there were still tens of thousands of internally displaced persons living in camps throughout Nias.

Nias's coastline has changed markedly with the tsunami and earthquake. In some areas, the coast moved over 50 m (160 ft) inland. In other areas, as much as a further 100 m (330 ft) of land has been exposed. Uplift of land as much as 2.9 m (9.5 ft) has been recorded.

Following the earthquake, many international aid agencies moved in to assist in rehabilitation and reconstruction efforts. Oxfam, International Aid, Giving Children Hope, Save the Children Fund, World Vision, Surf Aid, Safe Harbor International, and Caritas International are some of the international NGOs represented in Nias. UN agencies represented include UNORC – Office of the UN Recovery Coordinator for Aceh and Nias, UNDP, UNICEF, UN-Habitat, WFP, IOM, and UNIDO.

== Administration ==
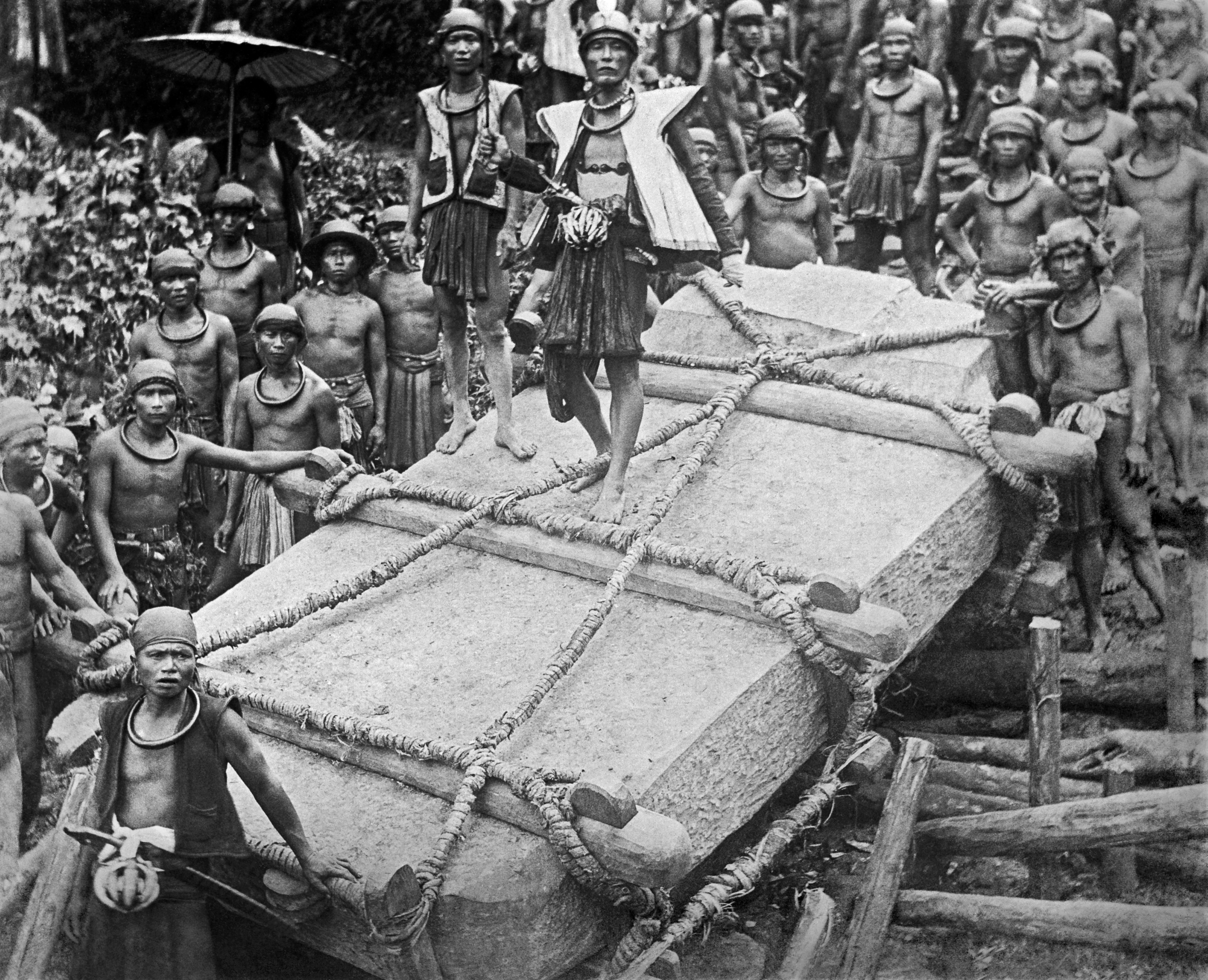
Nias men carrying a stone for construction for the deceased ruler Saunigeho of Bawömataluo around 1915.

Nias is the largest of the islands off Sumatra that are part of North Sumatra province. This archipelago consists of 131 islands, of which Nias Island is the biggest. The population in this area was 756,762 inhabitants at the 2010 Census, including Ono Niha (the indigenous inhabitants of the island), Malay, Batak, and Chinese; by the 2020 Census the population had risen to 880,550, and the official estimate as at mid 2024 was 946,746. Until 2003 Nias was a single administrative regency (kabupaten) covering the entire island, part of the province of North Sumatra. On 25 February 2003, it was split into two regencies, Nias Regency (covering the northern half of the island) and South Nias Regency (Nias Selatan), the latter including the Batu Islands further south.

Subsequently, on 20 October 2008, the island was divided further, with the creation of two further regencies from parts of the former Nias Regency – Nias Barat (West Nias) and Nias Utara (North Nias) – and the designation of Gunungsitoli as an autonomous city independent of the four regencies. Gunungsitoli remains the center of the business affairs of the entire island. Teluk Dalam is the capital of Nias Selatan Regency, Lötu of Nias Utara Regency, Lahömi of Nias Barat Regency, and Gidö of Nias Regency.

All parties in the North Sumatra Legislative Council have agreed to the formation of a Nias Province (comprising Nias, Nias Selatan, Nias Utara and Nias Barat regencies, and Gunungsitoli municipality), to be separated from North Sumatra Province. It was approved at a regional plenary session on 2 May 2011 but still awaits approval from the Central government, which has not yet enacted the grand design for additional provinces and has imposed a moratorium on such new creations. The new province will thus cover an area identical to the original Nias Regency before the latter's division in 2003. Apart from Nias Island itself, the province will include the smaller Batu Islands (Pulau-Pulau Batu) to the south, lying between Nias and Siberut; the Batu Islands form seven administrative districts within South Nias Regency.

Kode Wilayah	Name of City or Regency	Area in km^{2}	Pop'n census 2010	Pop'n census 2020	Pop'n estimate mid 2024	Capital	No. of villages	HDI 2022
12.78	Gunungsitoli City	208.684	126,202	136,017	145,233	Gunungsitoli	101	0.702 (High)
12.04	Nias Regency	902.395	131,377	146,672	155,629	Gidö	170	0.639 (Medium)
12.14	South Nias Regency (Nias Selatan)	2,531.703	289,708	360,531	389,957	Teluk Dalam	461	0.631 (Medium)
12.24	North Nias Regency (Nias Utara)	1,238.055	127,244	147,274	158,676	Lotu	113	0.637 (Medium)
12.25	West Nias Regency (Nias Barat)	464.219	81,807	89,994	97,251	Lahomi	105	0.629 (Medium)
	Totals	5,345.056	756,338	880,550	946,746		950	

# South Nias Regency includes the Batu Islands.

== Culture ==
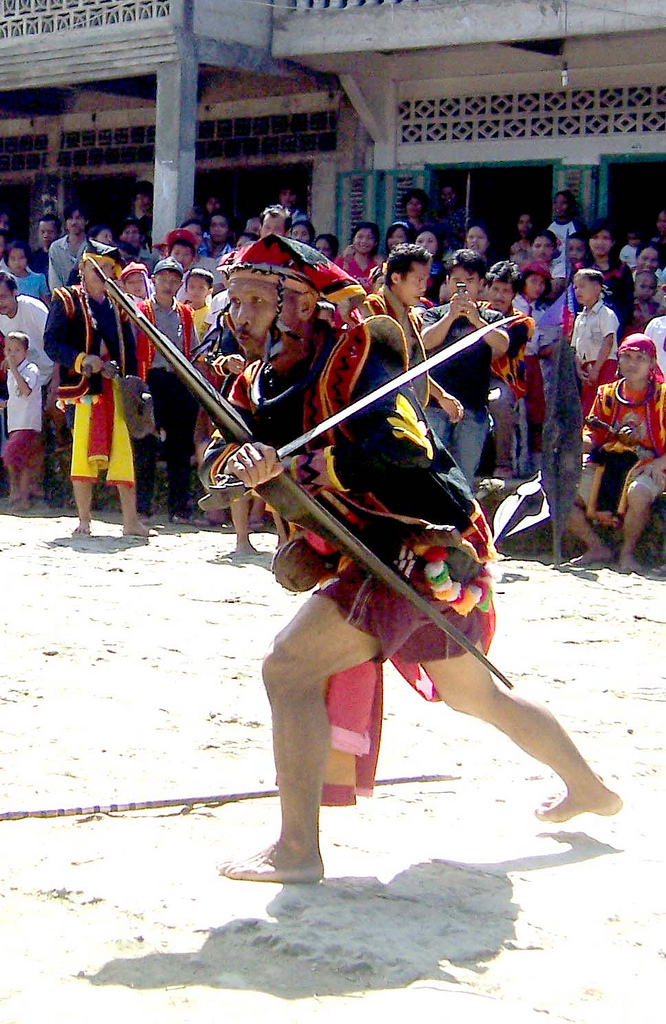
A man holding a Balato (sword) in a Nias war dance.

Religion in Nias (2023)
1. Protestantism (80.0%)
2. Roman Catholic (17.1%)
3. Islam (2.85%)
4. Buddhism (0.01%)
5. Hinduism and others (0.01%)

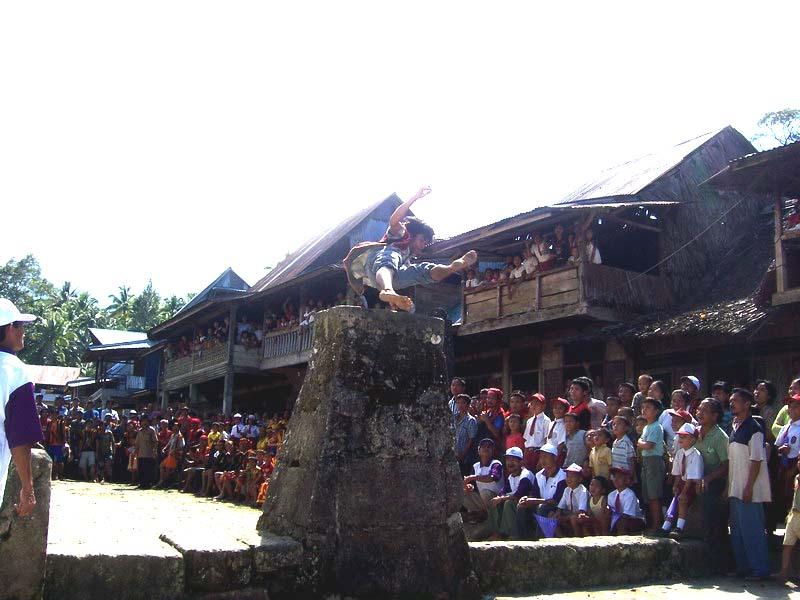
Nias ceremonial stone jump.

The isolated Nias Island chain has been trading since prehistory with other cultures, other islands, and even mainland Asia. Some historians and archaeologists have cited the local culture as one of the few remaining Megalithic cultures in existence today. While this point of view is hotly debated, there is no doubt that Nias' relative geographic isolation has created a unique culture. Nias is best known for its diversity of festivals and celebrations. The most well-known events are War Dances, performed regularly for tourists, and Stone Jumping, a manhood ritual that sees young men leaping over two-meter stone towers to their fate. In the past, the top of the stone board is covered with spikes and sharp pointed bamboo. The music of Nias, performed mostly by women, is noted worldwide for its haunting beauty.

Gunungsitoli is home to Nias's only museum, the Museum Pusaka Nias (Nias Heritage Foundation), which houses over 6000 objects related to Nias's cultural heritage. The museum had recently built a new building and had improved its storage and exhibitions when the 2004 earthquake and tsunami occurred. The museum suffered some damage to the grounds and collections, but museum staff are working to recover from this devastating event

The predominant religion is Protestant Christianity. Four out of five Niasans are Protestant; the remainder are mainly divided between Catholics (17%) and Muslims (almost 3%, mostly immigrants from elsewhere in Indonesia). However, adherence to either Christian or Muslim religions is still largely symbolic; Nias continues into the current day celebrating its own indigenous culture and traditions as the primary form of spiritual expression.

The people of Nias build Omo Hada houses on massive ironwood pillars with towering roofs. Not only were they almost impregnable to attack in former tribal warfare, but their flexible nail-less construction provided proven earthquake durability.

== Environment ==
Nias is home not only to a unique human culture but also endemic fauna which differ from other areas of North Sumatra because of the island's remote location separate from Sumatra. The island has been recognised as an Important Bird Area (IBA) by BirdLife International.

== Transportation ==
To reach Nias, there is a weekly ship from Jakarta to Gunungsitoli; there were ferries from Sibolga to Gunungsitoli, Teluk Dalam (in the far south of the island), or Lahewa (in the north) every day; before the Asian financial crisis hit Indonesia, there was a daily flight from Medan to Gunungsitoli. This became less frequent following the crisis.

Since the 1998 Reformation, however, transport links on and to the island have become poor. Internally, the road system is in very bad condition. Externally the air and ferry links are unreliable. There are two ferry terminals (Gunungsitoli and Teluk Dalam) and an airport (Binaka, near Gunungsitoli) on the island, serviced mainly from Sibolga and Medan respectively. However, local ferry companies regularly go out of business (or their boats sink), so only one terminal may be active at any given time. Since the 2005 earthquake, transportation has improved to cope with the increase in travel needs for reconstruction and rehabilitation efforts. Wings Air and Manunggal Air are the airlines that fly to Gunungsitoli.

National flag carrier Garuda Indonesia was set to operate a new service from Jakarta to Nias in North Sumatra starting 15 November 2018. This direct flight allows travelers to visit the regency's capital Gunungsitoli. Using the Bombardier CRJ 1000 Next-Gen that can accommodate 96 passengers, the route operates three times a week, on Tuesday, Thursday, and Saturday.

== Surfing ==
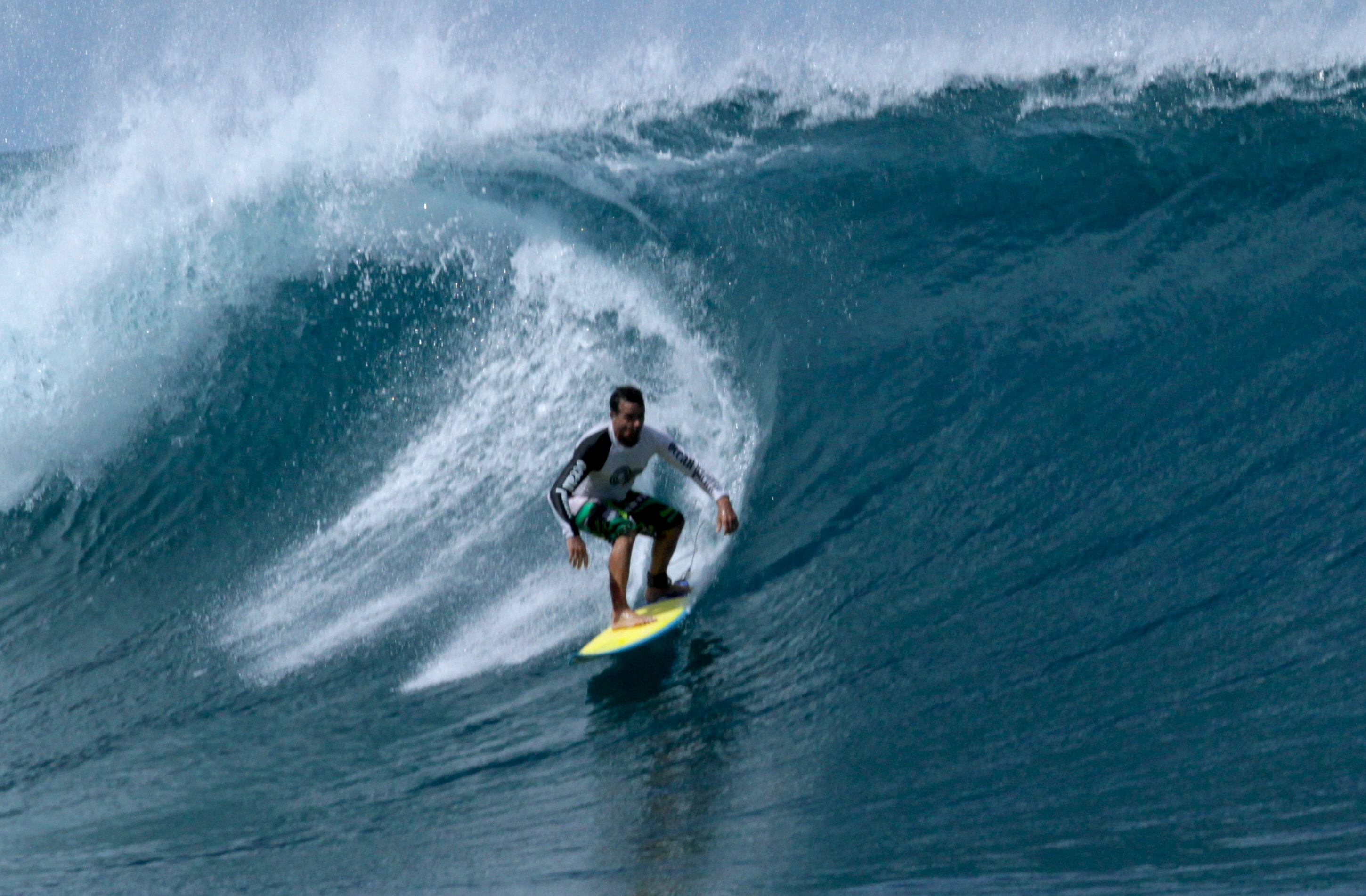
Surfing in Sorake

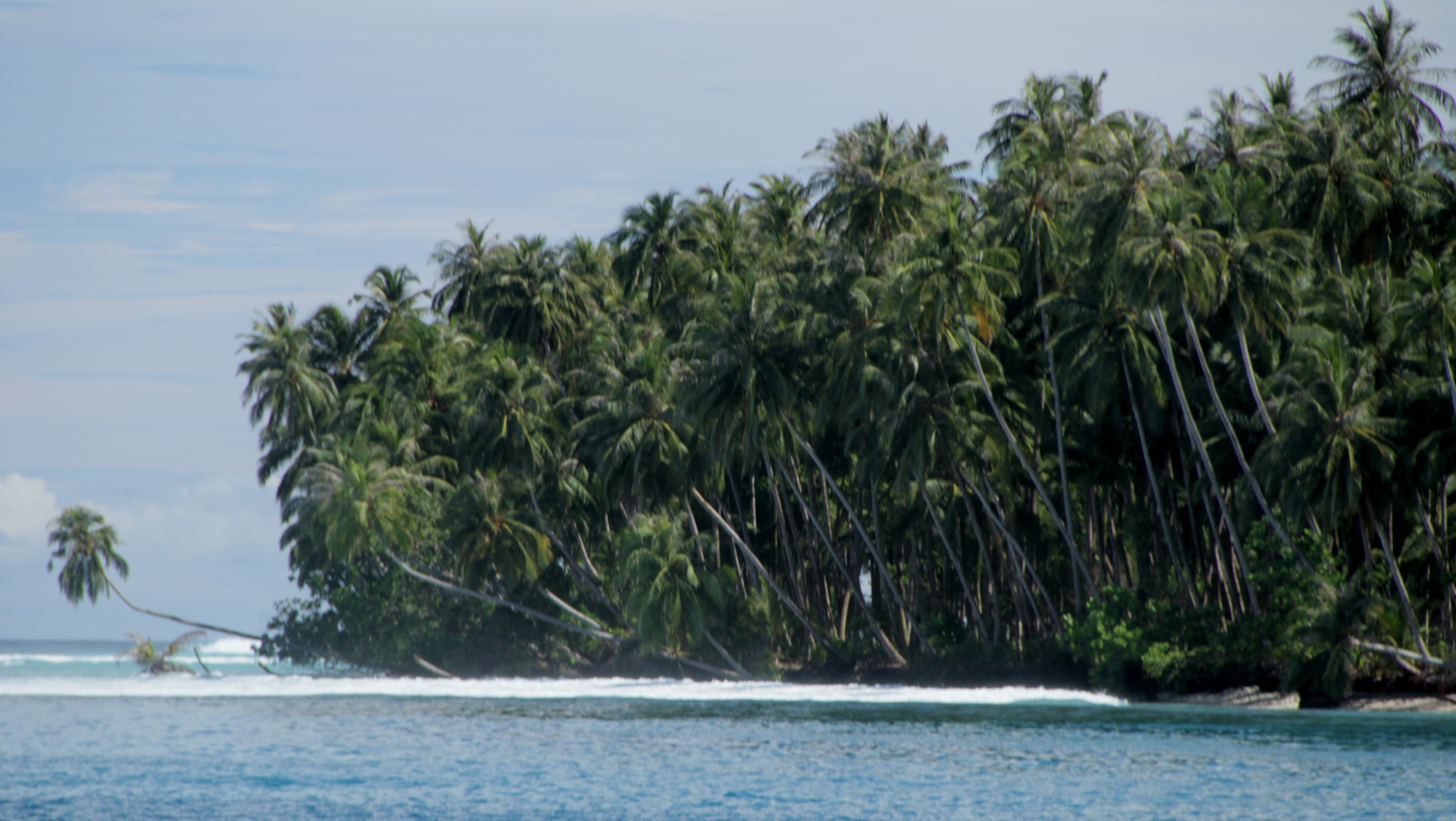
Coconut trees in Teluk Dalam

Nias is an internationally famous surfing destination. The best-known surfing area is Sorake Bay, close to the town of Teluk Dalam, on the southern tip.

Nias was part of the famous Hippie trail of the 1960s, particularly traveled by surfers, which led to Bali. It has been the site of several international surfing competitions in the past, particularly before the 1998 Indonesian Reformation Movement.

Despite the storied history of surfing in Nias, international surfing in Nias has slowed down especially (but not specifically) due to the earthquakes of December 2004 and January 2005. The situation has since been gradually improving, however.

== Gallery ==
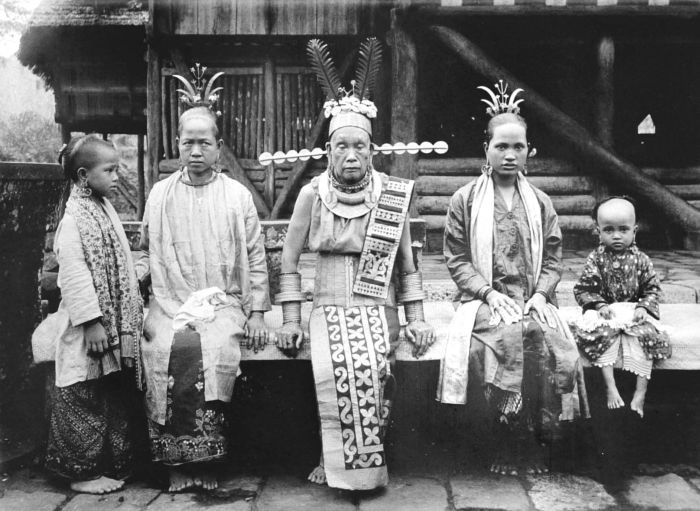
Family portrait of an older Nias princess with her daughters and granddaughters

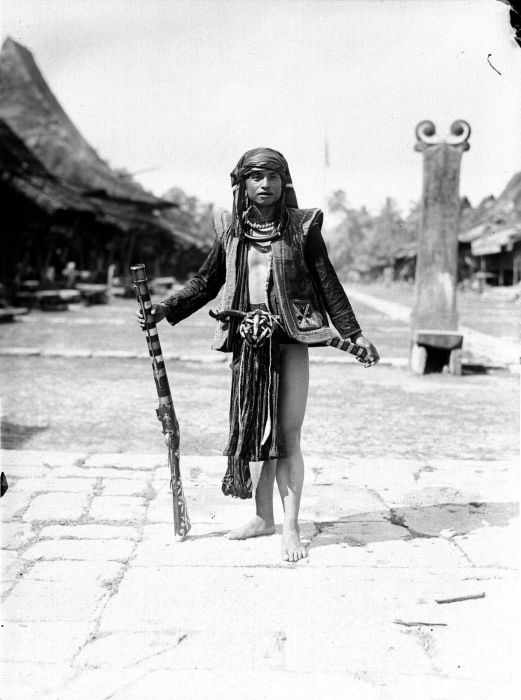
Nias warrior

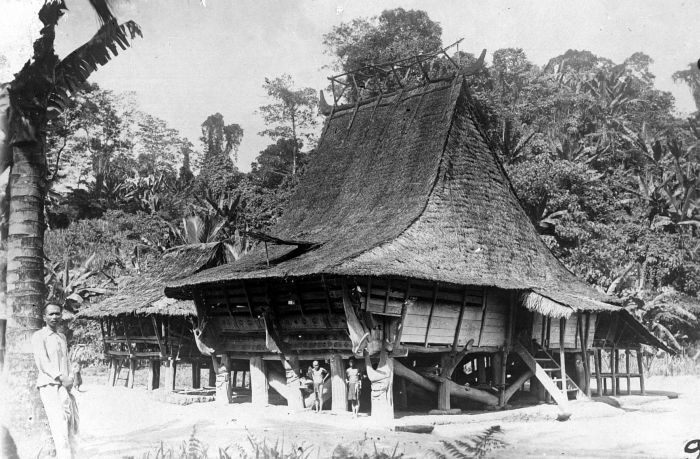
Nias house

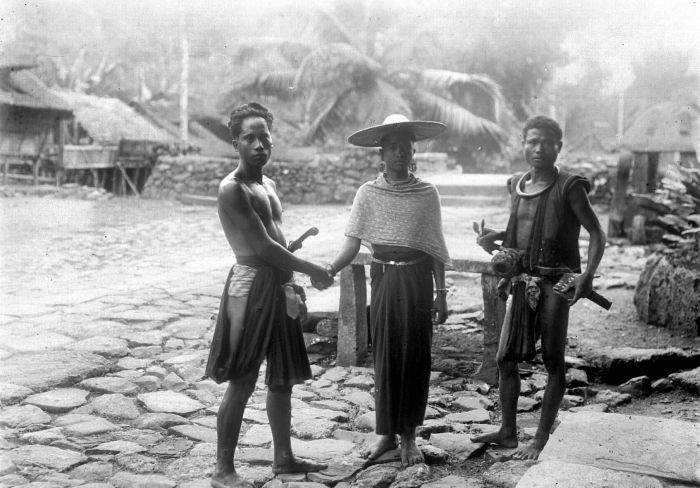
Nias wedding

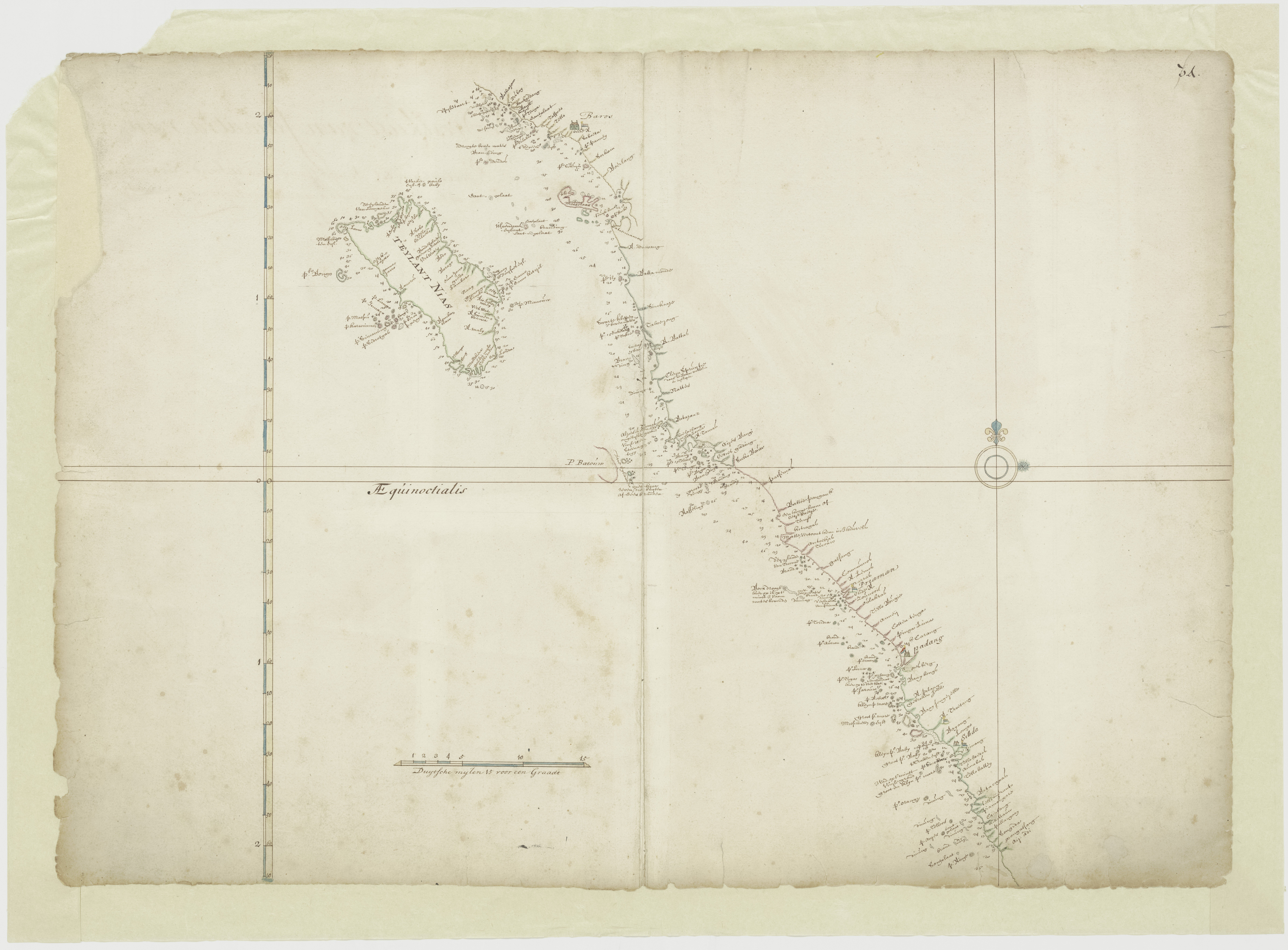
Map of Nias and the westcoast of Sumatra between 1690 and 1743

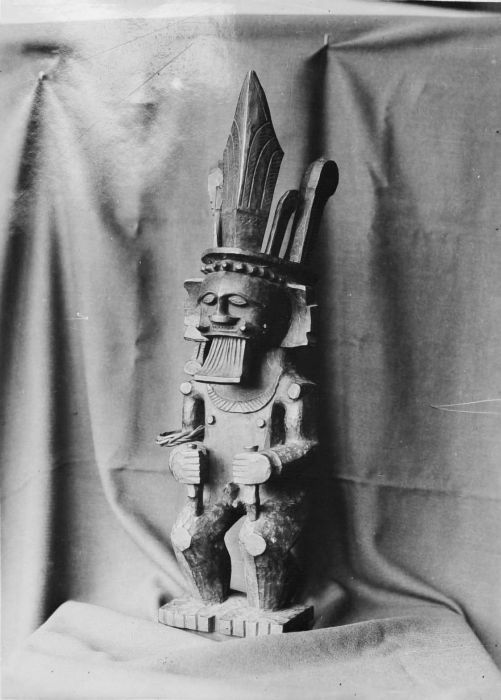
Nias ancestor statue

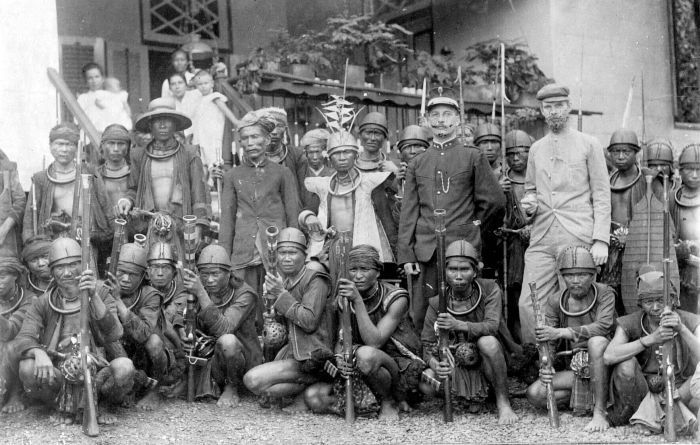
A band of Nias headhunters submitting to the Dutch

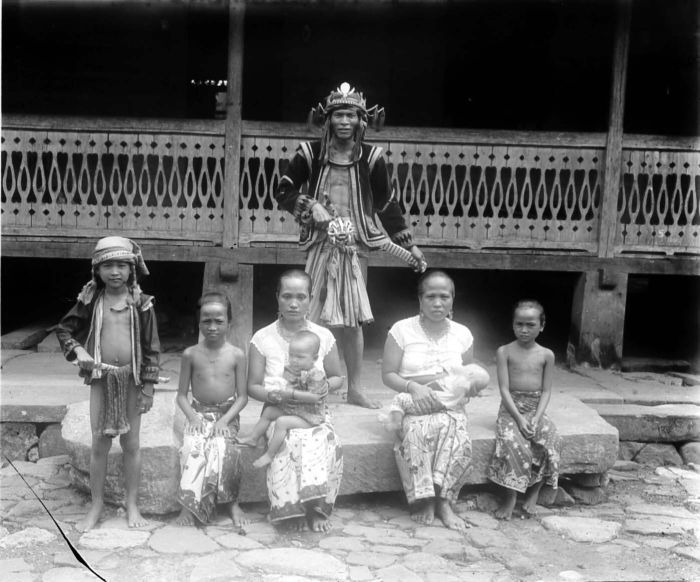
Nias family

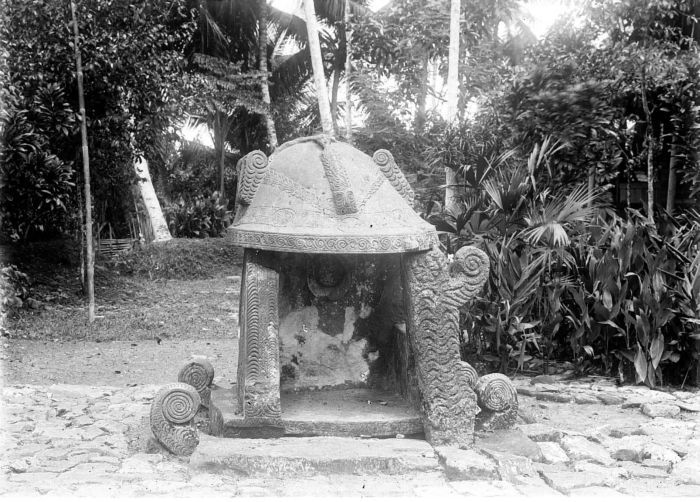
Nias place of sacrifice

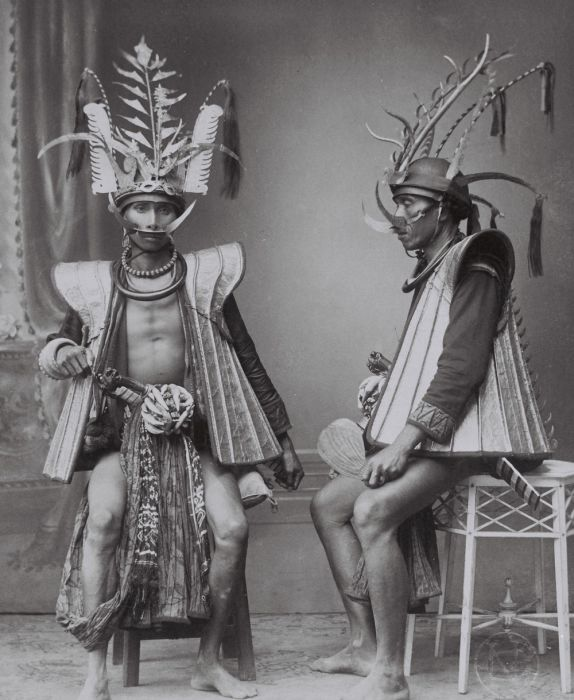
Nias armour

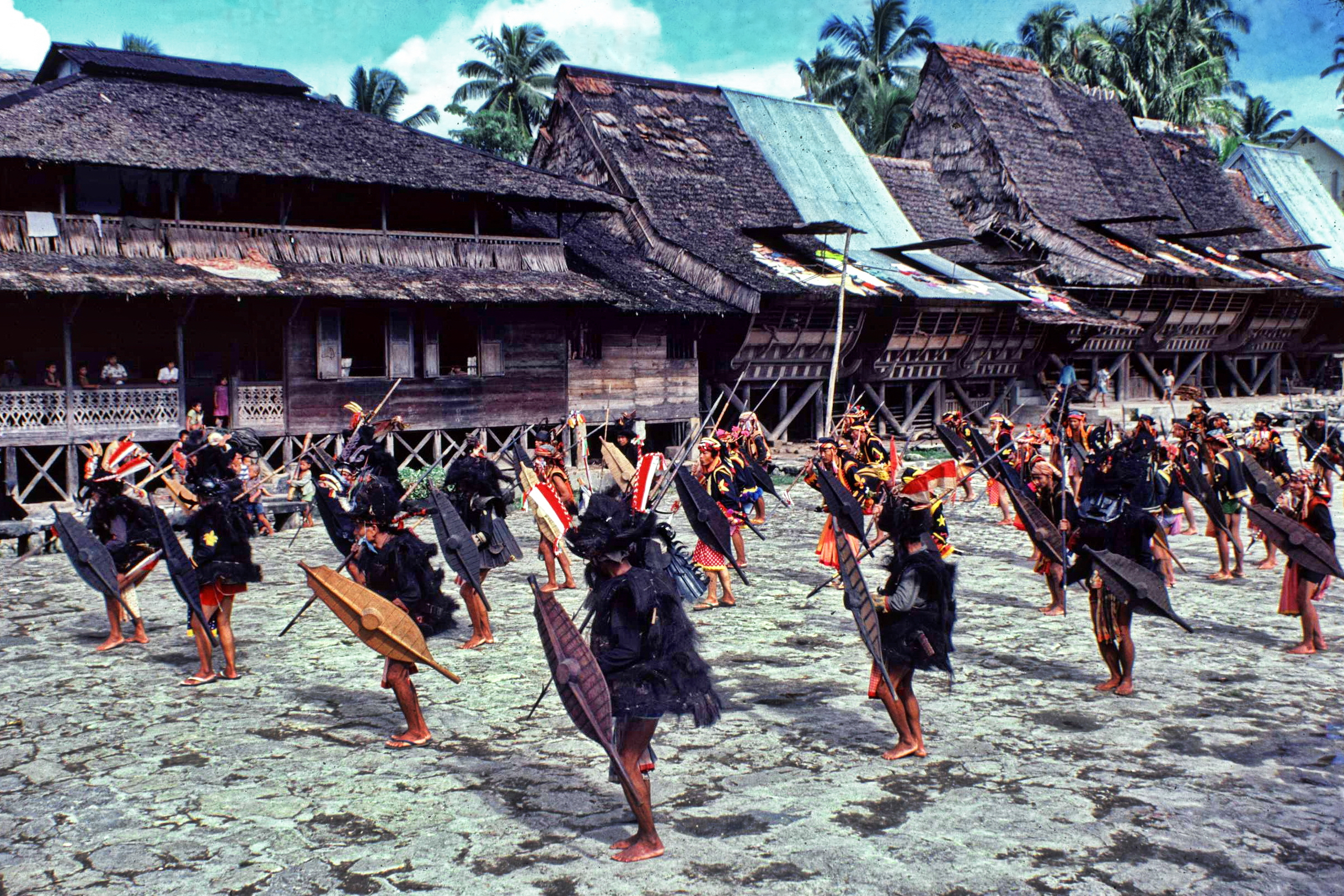
Nias war dance

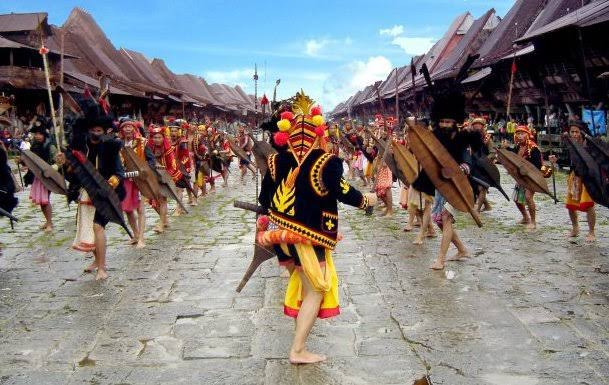
Dancers with traditional Nias shields

A man speaking Li Niha

== See also ==
- List of islands of Indonesia
- Mentawai Islands
- Nias Expedition
- Omo sebua
- Austronesian expansion

== Bibliography ==
- Oktorino, Nino (2019), Seri Nusantara Membara: Invasi ke Sumatra (in Indonesian), Jakarta: Elex Media Komputindo, ISBN 978-602-04-8798-4
