= List of regencies and cities in Indonesia =

List of Indonesian regencies and cities

Regencies (kabupaten) and cities (kota) are the second-level administrative subdivision in Indonesia, immediately below the provinces, and above the districts. Regencies are roughly equivalent to American counties, although most cities in the United States are below the counties. Following the implementation of decentralization beginning on 1 January 2001, regencies and city municipalities became the key administrative units responsible for providing most governmental services. Each of regencies and cities has their own local government and legislative body.

The difference between a regency and a city lies in demography, size, and economy. Generally, a regency comprises a rural area larger than a city, but also often includes various towns. A city usually has non-agricultural economic activities. A regency is headed by a regent (bupati), while a city is headed by a mayor (wali kota). All regents, mayors, and members of legislatures are directly elected via elections to serve for a five-year term which can be renewed once. Each regency or city is divided further into districts more commonly known as kecamatan (except in the Special Region of Yogyakarta, where kapanewon and kemantren are used, and Western New Guinea (Papua), where distrik is used).

An administrative city (kota administrasi) or an administrative regency (kabupaten administrasi) is a subdivision of province without its own local legislatures (Dewan Perwakilan Rakyat Daerah). The leader of administrative city or administrative regency is directly appointed by the governor. This type of city and regency in Indonesia is only found in Jakarta which consisted of five administrative cities and one administrative regency.

As of January 2023, there were 514-second-level administrative divisions (416 regencies and 98 cities) in Indonesia. The list below groups regencies and cities in Indonesia by provinces. Each regency has an administrative centre, the regency seat.

== List of regencies and cities by province ==
A map of the regencies and cities of Indonesia

=== Sumatra ===
==== Aceh ====

No	Regency	Capital	HDI (2025)
1	South Aceh	Tapaktuan	0.727 (High)
2	Southeast Aceh	Kutacane	0.743 (High)
3	East Aceh	Idi Rayeuk	0.722 (High)
4	Central Aceh	Takengon	0.780 (High)
5	West Aceh	Meulaboh	0.763 (High)
6	Aceh Besar	Jantho	0.774 (High)
7	Pidie	Sigli	0.744 (High)
8	North Aceh	Lhoksukon	0.742 (High)
9	Simeulue	Sinabang	0.719 (High)
10	Aceh Singkil	Singkil	0.726 (High)
11	Bireuën	Bireuën	0.762 (High)
12	Southwest Aceh	Blangpidie	0.721 (High)
13	Gayo Lues	Blangkejeren	0.726 (High)
14	Aceh Jaya	Calang	0.742 (High)
15	Nagan Raya	Suka Makmue	0.738 (High)
16	Aceh Tamiang	Karang Baru	0.747 (High)
17	Bener Meriah	Simpang Tiga Redelong	0.774 (High)
18	Pidie Jaya	Meureudu	0.770 (High)
No	City		HDI (2025)
1	Banda Aceh		0.895 (Very High)
2	Sabang		0.800 (Very High)
3	Lhokseumawe		0.817 (Very High)
4	Langsa		0.817 (Very High)
5	Subulussalam		0.716 (High)

==== North Sumatra ====
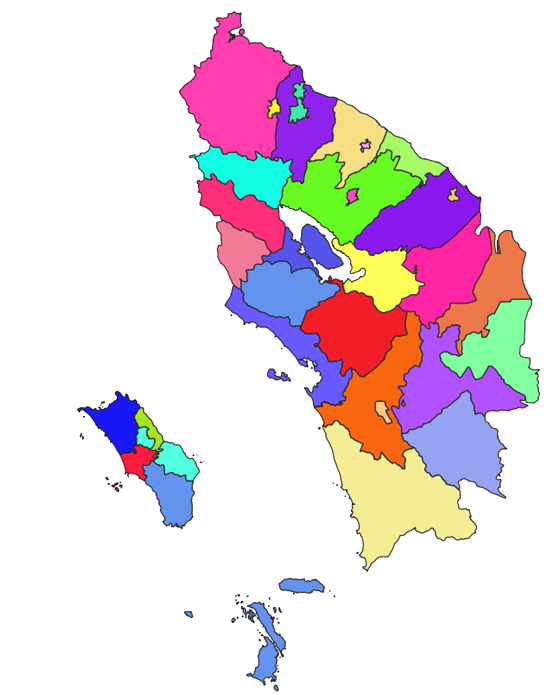

No	Regency	Capital	HDI (2025)
1	Asahan	Kisaran	0.751 (High)
2	Batubara	Limapuluh	0.739 (High)
3	Central Tapanuli	Pandan	0.739 (High)
4	Dairi	Sidikalang	0.766 (High)
5	Deli Serdang	Lubuk Pakam	0.782 (High)
6	Humbang Hasundutan	Dolok Sanggul	0.739 (High)
7	Karo	Kabanjahe	0.781 (High)
8	Labuhan Batu	Rantau Prapat	0.757 (High)
9	Langkat	Stabat	0.755 (High)
10	Mandailing Natal	Panyabungan	0.742 (High)
11	Nias	Gido	0.667 (Medium)
12	North Labuhan Batu	Aek Kanopan	0.767 (High)
13	North Nias	Lotu	0.673 (Medium)
14	North Padang Lawas	Gunung Tua	0.751 (High)
15	North Tapanuli	Tarutung	0.780 (High)
16	Padang Lawas	Sibuhuan	0.739 (High)
17	Pakpak Bharat	Salak	0.738 (High)
18	Samosir	Pangururan	0.746 (High)
19	Serdang Bedagai	Sei Rampah	0.746 (High)
20	Simalungun	Raya	0.764 (High)
21	South Labuhan Batu	Kota Pinang	0.757 (High)
22	South Nias	Teluk Dalam	0.667 (Medium)
23	South Tapanuli	Sipirok	0.757 (High)
24	Toba	Balige	0.791 (High)
25	West Nias	Lahomi	0.666 (Medium)
No	City		HDI (2025)
1	Binjai		0.792 (High)
2	Gunungsitoli		0.732 (High)
3	Medan		0.837 (Very High)
4	Padang Sidempuan		0.791 (High)
5	Pematangsiantar		0.817 (Very High)
6	Sibolga		0.781 (High)
7	Tanjungbalai		0.767 (High)
8	Tebing Tinggi		0.792 (High)

==== West Sumatra ====
No	Regency	Capital	HDI (2025)
1	Agam	Lubuk Basung	0.760 (High)
2	Dharmasraya	Pulau Punjung	0.757 (High)
3	Lima Puluh Kota	Sari Lamak	0.734 (High)
4	Mentawai Islands	Tuapejat	0.676 (Medium)
5	Padang Pariaman	Parit Malintang	0.757 (High)
6	Pasaman	Lubuk Sikaping	0.716 (High)
7	Sijunjung	Muaro Sijunjung	0.737 (High)
8	Solok	Arosuka	0.732 (High)
9	Pesisir Selatan	Painan	0.737 (High)
10	South Solok	Padang Aro	0.740 (High)
11	Tanah Datar	Batusangkar	0.770 (High)
12	West Pasaman	Simpang Ampek	0.736 (High)
No	City		HDI (2025)
1	Bukittinggi		0.830 (Very High)
2	Padang		0.849 (Very High)
3	Padang Panjang		0.813 (Very High)
4	Pariaman		0.812 (Very High)
5	Payakumbuh		0.816 (Very High)
6	Sawahlunto		0.770 (High)
7	Solok		0.809 (Very High)

==== Jambi ====
No	Regency	Capital	HDI (2025)
1	Batang Hari	Muara Bulian	0.739 (High)
2	Bungo	Muara Bungo	0.751 (High)
3	East Tanjung Jabung	Muara Sabak	0.712 (High)
4	Kerinci	Siulak	0.751 (High)
5	Merangin	Bangko	0.734 (High)
6	Muaro Jambi	Sengeti	0.738 (High)
7	Sarolangun	Sarolangun	0.747 (High)
8	Tebo	Muara Tebo	0.734 (High)
9	West Tanjung Jabung	Kuala Tungkal	0.730 (High)
No	City		HDI (2025)
1	Jambi		0.823 (Very High)
2	Sungai Penuh		0.788 (High)

==== Riau ====
No	Regency	Capital	HDI (2025)
1	Bengkalis	Bengkalis	0.770 (High)
2	Indragiri Hilir	Tembilahan	0.707 (High)
3	Indragiri Hulu	Rengat	0.734 (High)
4	Kampar	Bangkinang	0.769 (High)
5	Kuantan Singingi	Teluk Kuantan	0.746 (High)
6	Meranti Islands	Selat Panjang	0.702 (High)
7	Pelalawan	Pangkalan Kerinci	0.758 (High)
8	Rokan Hulu	Pasir Pangaraian	0.736 (High)
9	Rokan Hilir	Bagansiapiapi	0.730 (High)
10	Siak	Siak Sri Indrapura	0.771 (High)
No	City		HDI (2025)
1	Dumai		0.775 (High)
2	Pekanbaru		0.849 (Very High)

==== Bengkulu ====
No	Regency	Capital	HDI (2025)
1	Central Bengkulu	Karang Tinggi	0.724 (High)
2	Kaur	Bintuhan	0.724 (High)
3	Kepahiang	Kepahiang	0.729 (High)
4	Lebong	Muara Aman	0.741 (High)
5	Mukomuko	Mukomuko	0.744 (High)
6	North Bengkulu	Arga Makmur	0.735 (High)
7	Rejang Lebong	Curup	0.758 (High)
8	Seluma	Pasar Tais	0.718 (High)
9	South Bengkulu	Manna	0.753 (High)
No	City		HDI (2025)
1	Bengkulu		0.845 (Very High)

==== South Sumatra ====
No	Regency	Capital	HDI (2025)
1	Banyuasin	Pangkalan Balai	0.724 (High)
2	East Ogan Komering Ulu	Martapura	0.744 (High)
3	Empat Lawang	Tebing Tinggi	0.705 (High)
4	Lahat	Lahat	0.737 (High)
5	Muara Enim	Muara Enim	0.737 (High)
6	Musi Banyuasin	Sekayu	0.731 (High)
7	Musi Rawas	Muara Beliti	0.719 (High)
8	North Musi Rawas	Rupit	0.713 (High)
9	Ogan Ilir	Indralaya	0.732 (High)
10	Ogan Komering Ilir	Kayuagung	0.722 (High)
11	Ogan Komering Ulu	Baturaja	0.744 (High)
12	Penukal Abab Lematang Ilir	Talang Ubi	0.705 (High)
13	South Ogan Komering Ulu	Muaradua	0.709 (High)
No	City		HDI (2025)
1	Lubuklinggau		0.799 (High)
2	Pagar Alam		0.749 (High)
3	Palembang		0.832 (Very High)
4	Prabumulih		0.791 (High)

==== Lampung ====
No	Regency	Capital	HDI (2025)
1	Central Lampung	Gunung Sugih	0.748 (High)
2	East Lampung	Sukadana	0.739 (High)
3	Mesuji	Mesuji	0.694 (Medium)
4	North Lampung	Kotabumi	0.722 (High)
5	Pesawaran	Gedong Tataan	0.709 (High)
6	Pringsewu	Pringsewu	0.747 (High)
7	South Lampung	Kalianda	0.731 (High)
8	Tanggamus	Kota Agung Pusat	0.713 (High)
9	Tulang Bawang	Menggala	0.731 (High)
10	Way Kanan	Blambangan Umpu	0.719 (High)
11	West Lampung	Liwa	0.731 (High)
12	Pesisir Barat	Krui	0.717 (High)
13	West Tulang Bawang	Panaragan Jaya	0.706 (High)
No	City		HDI (2025)
1	Bandar Lampung		0.812 (Very High)
2	Metro		0.812 (Very High)

==== Bangka Belitung Islands ====
No	Regency	Capital	HDI (2025)
1	Bangka	Sungailiat	0.753 (High)
2	Belitung	Tanjung Pandan	0.752 (High)
3	South Bangka	Toboali	0.708 (High)
4	Central Bangka	Koba	0.731 (High)
5	West Bangka	Muntok	0.722 (High)
6	East Belitung	Manggar	0.739 (High)
No	City		HDI (2025)
1	Pangkal Pinang		0.816 (Very High)

==== Riau Islands ====
No	Regency	Capital	HDI (2025)
1	Anambas Islands	Tarempa	0.740 (High)
2	Bintan	Bandar Seri Bentan	0.786 (High)
3	Karimun	Tanjung Balai Karimun	0.760 (High)
4	Lingga	Daik	0.738 (High)
5	Natuna	Ranai	0.789 (High)
No	City		HDI (2025)
1	Batam		0.838 (Very High)
2	Tanjung Pinang		0.820 (Very High)

=== Java ===
==== Special Capital Region of Jakarta ====
No	Administrative regency	Government	HDI (2025)
1	Thousand Islands	Pramuka Island	0.775 (High)
No	Administrative city		HDI (2025)
1	Central Jakarta	Menteng	0.844 (Very High)
2	East Jakarta	Jatinegara	0.855 (Very High)
3	North Jakarta	Koja	0.831 (Very High)
4	South Jakarta	Kebayoran Baru	0.885 (Very High)
5	West Jakarta	Kembangan	0.851 (Very High)

==== Banten ====
No	Regency	Capital	HDI (2025)
1	Lebak	Rangkasbitung	0.692 (Medium)
2	Pandeglang	Pandeglang	0.718 (High)
3	Serang	Ciruas	0.741 (High)
4	Tangerang	Tigaraksa	0.767 (High)
No	City		HDI (2025)
1	Cilegon		0.795 (High)
2	Serang		0.775 (High)
3	South Tangerang		0.848 (Very High)
4	Tangerang		0.824 (Very High)

==== West Java ====
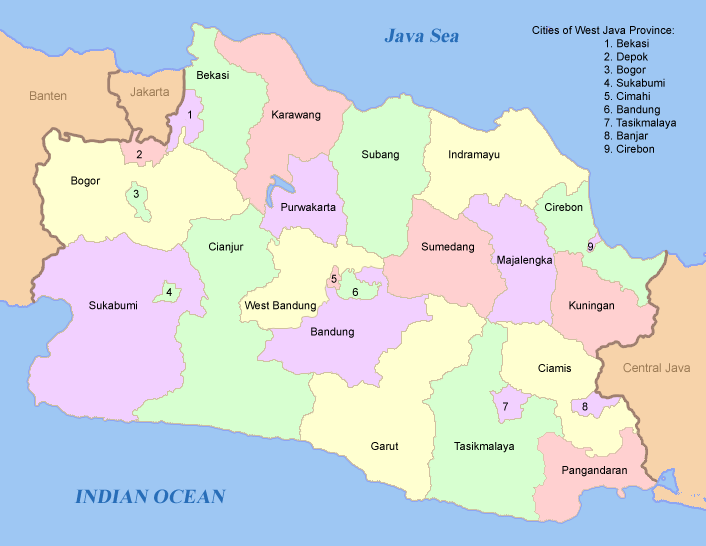

No	Regency	Capital	HDI (2025)
1	Bandung	Soreang	0.755 (High)
2	Bekasi	Cikarang	0.778 (High)
3	Bogor	Cibinong	0.745 (High)
4	Ciamis	Ciamis	0.743 (High)
5	Cianjur	Cianjur	0.698 (Medium)
6	Cirebon	Sumber	0.732 (High)
7	Garut	South Tarogong	0.706 (High)
8	Indramayu	Indramayu	0.715 (High)
9	Karawang	Karawang	0.745 (High)
10	Kuningan	Kuningan	0.723 (High)
11	Majalengka	Majalengka	0.723 (High)
12	Pangandaran	Parigi	0.716 (High)
13	Purwakarta	Purwakarta	0.749 (High)
14	Subang	Subang	0.730 (High)
15	Sukabumi	Pelabuhan Ratu	0.711 (High)
16	Sumedang	Sumedang	0.755 (High)
17	Tasikmalaya	Singaparna	0.707 (High)
18	West Bandung	Ngamprah	0.716 (High)
No	City		HDI (2025)
1	Bandung		0.846 (Very High)
2	Banjar		0.755 (High)
3	Bekasi		0.844 (Very High)
4	Bogor		0.797 (High)
5	Cimahi		0.808 (Very High)
6	Cirebon		0.789 (High)
7	Depok		0.840 (Very High)
8	Sukabumi		0.782 (High)
9	Tasikmalaya		0.765 (High)

==== Central Java ====

No	Regency	Capital	HDI (2025)
1	Banjarnegara	Banjarnegara	0.706 (High)
2	Banyumas	Purwokerto	0.754 (High)
3	Batang	Batang	0.717 (High)
4	Blora	Blora	0.723 (High)
5	Boyolali	Boyolali	0.769 (High)
6	Brebes	Brebes	0.711 (High)
7	Cilacap	Cilacap	0.734 (High)
8	Demak	Demak	0.750 (High)
9	Grobogan	Purwodadi	0.729 (High)
10	Jepara	Jepara	0.749 (High)
11	Karanganyar	Karanganyar	0.786 (High)
12	Kebumen	Kebumen	0.731 (High)
13	Kendal	Kendal	0.750 (High)
14	Klaten	Klaten	0.786 (High)
15	Kudus	Kudus	0.779 (High)
16	Magelang	Mungkid	0.730 (High)
17	Pati	Pati	0.749 (High)
18	Pekalongan	Kajen	0.727 (High)
19	Pemalang	Pemalang	0.694 (Medium)
20	Purbalingga	Purbalingga	0.717 (High)
21	Purworejo	Purworejo	0.759 (High)
22	Rembang	Rembang	0.734 (High)
23	Semarang	Ungaran	0.764 (High)
24	Sragen	Sragen	0.763 (High)
25	Sukoharjo	Sukoharjo	0.799 (High)
26	Tegal	Slawi	0.723 (High)
27	Temanggung	Temanggung	0.725 (High)
28	Wonogiri	Wonogiri	0.734 (High)
29	Wonosobo	Wonosobo	0.715 (High)
No	City		HDI (2025)
1	Magelang		0.829 (Very High)
2	Pekalongan		0.777 (High)
3	Salatiga		0.862 (Very High)
4	Semarang		0.858 (Very High)
5	Surakarta		0.849 (Very High)
6	Tegal		0.779 (High)

==== East Java ====
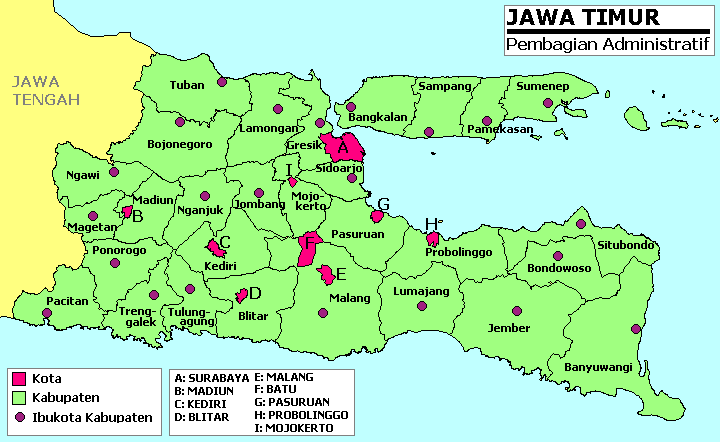
Regencies and cities in East Java

No	Regency	Capital	HDI (2025)
1	Bangkalan	Bangkalan	0.681 (Medium)
2	Banyuwangi	Banyuwangi	0.751 (High)
3	Blitar	Kanigoro	0.744 (High)
4	Bojonegoro	Bojonegoro	0.737 (High)
5	Bondowoso	Bondowoso	0.717 (High)
6	Gresik	Gresik	0.796 (High)
7	Jember	Jember	0.715 (High)
8	Jombang	Jombang	0.763 (High)
9	Kediri	Ngasem	0.760 (High)
10	Lamongan	Lamongan	0.768 (High)
11	Lumajang	Lumajang	0.710 (High)
12	Madiun	Caruban	0.754 (High)
13	Magetan	Magetan	0.775 (High)
14	Malang	Kepanjen	0.744 (High)
15	Mojokerto	Mojosari	0.774 (High)
16	Nganjuk	Nganjuk	0.758 (High)
17	Ngawi	Ngawi	0.744 (High)
18	Pacitan	Pacitan	0.722 (High)
19	Pamekasan	Pamekasan	0.716 (High)
20	Pasuruan	Bangil	0.730 (High)
21	Ponorogo	Ponorogo	0.746 (High)
22	Probolinggo	Kraksaan	0.716 (High)
23	Sampang	Sampang	0.672 (Medium)
24	Sidoarjo	Sidoarjo	0.833 (Very High)
25	Situbondo	Situbondo	0.718 (High)
26	Sumenep	Sumenep	0.705 (High)
27	Trenggalek	Trenggalek	0.733 (High)
28	Tuban	Tuban	0.731 (High)
29	Tulungagung	Tulungagung	0.758 (High)
No	City		HDI (2025)
1	Batu		0.803 (Very High)
2	Blitar		0.820 (Very High)
3	Kediri		0.827 (Very High)
4	Madiun		0.851 (Very High)
5	Malang		0.855 (Very High)
6	Mojokerto		0.823 (Very High)
7	Pasuruan		0.795 (High)
8	Probolinggo		0.785 (High)
9	Surabaya		0.856 (Very High)

==== Special Region of Yogyakarta ====

No	Regency	Capital	HDI (2025)
1	Bantul	Bantul	0.830 (Very High)
2	Gunung Kidul	Wonosari	0.731 (High)
3	Kulon Progo	Wates	0.769 (High)
4	Sleman	Sleman	0.863 (Very High)
No	City		HDI (2024)
1	Yogyakarta		0.895 (Very High)

=== Lesser Sunda Islands ===
==== Bali ====
No	Regency	Capital	HDI (2025)
1	Badung	Mangupura	0.842 (Very High)
2	Bangli	Bangli	0.732 (High)
3	Buleleng	Singaraja	0.760 (High)
4	Gianyar	Gianyar	0.809 (High)
5	Jembrana	Negara	0.759 (High)
6	Karangasem	Amlapura	0.718 (Medium)
7	Klungkung	Semarapura	0.758 (High)
8	Tabanan	Tabanan	0.797 (High)
No	City		HDI (2024)
1	Denpasar		0.856 (Very High)

==== West Nusa Tenggara ====
No	Regency	Capital	HDI (2025)
1	Bima	Woha	0.719 (Medium)
2	Central Lombok	Praya	0.720 (Medium)
3	Dompu	Dompu	0.735 (High)
4	East Lombok	Selong	0.725 (Medium)
5	North Lombok	Tanjung	0.696 (Medium)
6	Sumbawa	Sumbawa Besar	0.732 (High)
7	West Lombok	Gerung	0.735 (High)
8	West Sumbawa	Taliwang	0.764 (High)
No	City		HDI (2025)
1	Bima		0.794 (High)
2	Mataram		0.823 (Very High)

==== East Nusa Tenggara ====
No	Regency	Capital	HDI (2024)
1	Alor	Kalabahi	0.638 (Medium)
2	Belu	Atambua	0.644 (Medium)
3	Central Sumba	Waibakul	0.643 (Medium)
4	East Flores	Larantuka	0.662 (Medium)
5	East Manggarai	Borong	0.642 (Medium)
6	East Sumba	Waingapu	0.676 (Medium)
7	Ende	Ende	0.691 (Medium)
8	Kupang	Oelamasi	0.665 (Medium)
9	Lembata	Lewoleba	0.666 (Medium)
10	Malaka	Betun	0.627 (Medium)
11	Manggarai	Ruteng	0.672 (Medium)
12	Nagekeo	Mbay	0.677 (Medium)
13	Ngada	Bajawa	0.695 (Medium)
14	North Central Timor	Kefamenanu	0.658 (Medium)
15	Rote Ndao	Baa	0.645 (Medium)
16	Sabu Raijua	West Savu	0.595 (Medium)
17	Sikka	Maumere	0.674 (Medium)
18	South Central Timor	Soe	0.643 (Medium)
19	Southwest Sumba	Tambolaka	0.642 (Medium)
20	West Manggarai	Labuan Bajo	0.666 (Medium)
21	West Sumba	Waikabubak	0.660 (Medium)
No	City		HDI (2024)
1	Kupang		0.810 (Very High)

=== Kalimantan ===
==== West Kalimantan ====
No	Regency	Capital	HDI (2024)
1	Bengkayang	Bengkayang	0.703 (High)
2	Kapuas Hulu	Putussibau	0.685 (Medium)
3	North Kayong	Sukadana	0.657 (Medium)
4	Ketapang	Ketapang	0.694 (Medium)
5	Kubu Raya	Sungai Raya	0.702 (High)
6	Landak	Ngabang	0.690 (Medium)
7	Melawi	Nanga Pinoh	0.686 (Medium)
8	Mempawah	Mempawah	0.685 (Medium)
9	Sambas	Sambas	0.693 (Medium)
10	Sanggau	Sanggau	0.684 (Medium)
11	Sekadau	Sekadau	0.672 (Medium)
12	Sintang	Sintang	0.694 (Medium)
No	City		HDI (2024)
1	Pontianak		0.815 (Very High)
2	Singkawang		0.738 (High)

==== South Kalimantan ====
No	Regency	Capital	HDI (2024)
1	Balangan	Paringin	0.713 (High)
2	Banjar	Martapura	0.718 (High)
3	Barito Kuala	Marabahan	0.688 (Medium)
4	Central Hulu Sungai	Barabai	0.706 (High)
5	Kotabaru	Kotabaru	0.706 (High)
6	North Hulu Sungai	Amuntai	0.682 (Medium)
7	South Hulu Sungai	Kandangan	0.712 (High)
8	Tabalong	Tanjung	0.744 (High)
9	Tanah Laut	Pelaihari	0.714 (High)
10	Tanah Bumbu	Batulicin	0.729 (High)
11	Tapin	Rantau	0.725 (High)
No	City		HDI (2024)
1	Banjarbaru		0.805 (Very High)
2	Banjarmasin		0.790 (High)

==== Central Kalimantan ====

No	Regency	Capital	HDI (2024)
1	East Barito	Tamiang Layang	0.732 (High)
2	East Kotawaringin	Sampit	0.726 (High)
3	Gunung Mas	Kuala Kurun	0.727 (High)
4	Kapuas	Kuala Kapuas	0.713 (High)
5	Katingan	Kasongan	0.707 (High)
6	Lamandau	Nanga Bulik	0.722 (High)
7	Murung Raya	Puruk Cahu	0.700 (High)
8	North Barito	Muara Teweh	0.723 (High)
9	Pulang Pisau	Pulang Pisau	0.702 (High)
10	Sukamara	Sukamara	0.698 (Medium)
11	Seruyan	Kuala Pembuang	0.690 (Medium)
12	South Barito	Buntok	0.723 (High)
13	West Kotawaringin	Pangkalan Bun	0.744 (High)
No	City		HDI (2024)
1	Palangka Raya		0.822 (Very High)

==== East Kalimantan ====
No	Regency	Capital	HDI (2025)
1	Berau	Tanjung Redeb	0.777 (High)
2	East Kutai	Sangatta	0.764 (High)
3	Kutai Kartanegara	Tenggarong	0.772 (High)
4	Mahakam Ulu	Ujoh Bilang	0.715 (High)
5	Paser	Tana Paser	0.758 (High)
6	Penajam North Paser	Penajam	0.758 (High)
7	West Kutai	Sendawar	0.753 (High)
No	City		HDI (2025)
1	Balikpapan		0.832 (Very High)
2	Bontang		0.830 (Very High)
3	Samarinda		0.835 (Very High)

==== North Kalimantan ====
No	Regency	Capital	HDI (2024)
1	Bulungan	Tanjung Selor	0.733 (High)
2	Malinau	Malinau	0.739 (High)
3	Nunukan	Nunukan	0.685 (Medium)
4	Tana Tidung	Tideng Pale	0.700 (High)
No	City		HDI (2024)
1	Tarakan		0.779 (High)

=== Sulawesi ===
==== Gorontalo ====
No	Regency	Capital	HDI (2024)
1	Boalemo	Tilamuta	0.687 (Medium)
2	Bone Bolango	Suwawa	0.723 (High)
3	Gorontalo	Limboto	0.696 (Medium)
4	North Gorontalo	Kwandang	0.674 (Medium)
5	Pohuwato	Marisa	0.680 (Medium)
No	City		HDI (2024)
1	Gorontalo		0.791 (High)

==== South Sulawesi ====
No	Regency	Capital	HDI (2024)
1	Bantaeng	Bantaeng	0.714 (High)
2	Barru	Barru	0.730 (High)
3	Bone	Watampone	0.683 (Medium)
4	Bulukumba	Bulukumba	0.719 (High)
5	East Luwu	Malili	0.749 (High)
6	Enrekang	Enrekang	0.746 (High)
7	Gowa	Sungguminasa	0.722 (High)
8	Jeneponto	Bontosunggu	0.663 (Medium)
9	Luwu	Belopa	0.727 (High)
10	North Luwu	Masamba	0.720 (High)
11	North Toraja	Rantepao	0.718 (High)
12	Maros	Maros	0.721 (High)
13	Pangkajene and Islands	Pangkajane	0.712 (High)
14	Pinrang	Pinrang	0.735 (High)
15	Selayar Islands	Benteng	0.700 (High)
16	Sinjai	Sinjai	0.695 (Medium)
17	Sidenreng Rappang	Pangkajene Sidenreng	0.732 (High)
18	Soppeng	Watansoppeng	0.713 (High)
19	Takalar	Pattallassang	0.694 (Medium)
20	Tana Toraja	Makale	0.716 (High)
21	Wajo	Sengkang	0.715 (High)
No	City		HDI (2024)
1	Makassar		0.839 (Very High)
2	Palopo		0.799 (High)
3	Parepare		0.796 (High)

==== West Sulawesi ====
No	Regency	Capital	HDI (2024)
1.	Central Mamuju	Tobadak	0.683 (Medium)
2.	Majene	Majene	0.694 (Medium)
3.	Mamasa	Mamasa	0.683 (Medium)
4.	Mamuju	Mamuju	0.704 (High)
5.	Pasangkayu	Pasangkayu	0.697 (Medium)
6.	Polewali Mandar	Polewali	0.662 (Medium)

==== Southeast Sulawesi ====
No	Regency	Capital	HDI (2024)
1	Bombana	Rumbia	0.681 (Medium)
2	Buton	Pasarwajo	0.688 (Medium)
3	Central Buton	Labungkari	0.664 (Medium)
4	East Kolaka	Tirawuta	0.702 (High)
5	Kolaka	Kolaka	0.751 (High)
6	Konawe	Unaaha	0.733 (High)
7	Konawe Islands	Langara	0.679 (Medium)
8	Muna	Raha	0.710 (High)
9	North Buton	Buranga	0.706 (High)
10	North Kolaka	Lasusua	0.717 (High)
11	North Konawe	Asera	0.723 (High)
12	South Buton	Batauga	0.670 (Medium)
13	South Konawe	Andoolo	0.711 (High)
14	Wakatobi	Wangiwangi	0.720 (High)
15	West Muna	Laworo	0.680 (Medium)
No	City		HDI (2024)
1	Baubau		0.781 (High)
2	Kendari		0.853 (Very High)

==== Central Sulawesi ====
No	Regency	Capital	HDI (2024)
1	Banggai	Luwuk	0.723 (High)
2	Banggai Islands	Salakan	0.674 (Medium)
3	Banggai Laut	Banggai	0.674 (Medium)
4	Buol	Buol	0.702 (High)
5	Donggala	Banawa	0.674 (Medium)
6	Morowali	Bungku	0.735 (High)
7	North Morowali	Kolonodale	0.705 (High)
8	Parigi Moutong	Parigi	0.674 (Medium)
9	Poso	Poso	0.728 (High)
10	Sigi	Sigi Biromaru	0.705 (High)
11	Tojo Una-Una	Ampana	0.669 (Medium)
12	Tolitoli	Tolitoli	0.683 (Medium)
No	City		HDI (2024)
1	Palu		0.828 (Very High)

==== North Sulawesi ====
No	Regency	Capital	HDI (2024)
1	Bolaang Mongondow	Lolak	0.702 (High)
2	East Bolaang Mongondow	Tutuyan	0.685 (Medium)
3	Minahasa	Tondano	0.777 (High)
4	North Bolaang Mongondow	Boroko	0.693 (Medium)
5	North Minahasa	Airmadidi	0.758 (High)
6	Sangihe Islands	Tahuna	0.727 (High)
7	Sitaro Islands	Ondong	0.703 (High)
8	South Bolaang Mongondow	Molibagu	0.671 (Medium)
9	South Minahasa	Amurang	0.741 (High)
10	Southeast Minahasa	Ratahan	0.726 (High)
11	Talaud Islands	Melonguane	0.717 (High)
No	City		HDI (2024)
1	Bitung		0.757 (High)
2	Kotamobagu		0.752 (High)
3	Manado		0.806 (Very High)
4	Tomohon		0.788 (High)

=== Maluku Islands ===
==== Maluku ====
No	Regency	Capital	HDI (2024)
1	Aru Islands	Dobo	0.658 (Medium)
2	Buru	Namlea	0.710 (High)
3	Central Maluku	Masohi	0.732 (High)
4	East Seram	Bula	0.662 (Medium)
5	South Buru	Namrole	0.670 (Medium)
6	Southeast Maluku	Langgur	0.682 (Medium)
7	Southwest Maluku	Tiakur	0.648 (Medium)
8	Tanimbar Islands	Saumlaki	0.648 (Medium)
9	West Seram	Piru	0.683 (Medium)
No	City		HDI (2024)
1	Ambon		0.825 (Very High)
2	Tual		0.702 (High)

==== North Maluku ====
No	Regency	Capital	HDI (2024)
1	Central Halmahera	Weda	0.684 (Medium)
2	East Halmahera	Maba	0.695 (Medium)
3	Morotai Island	Daruba	0.656 (Medium)
4	North Halmahera	Tobelo	0.697 (Medium)
5	South Halmahera	Labuha	0.666 (Medium)
6	Sula Islands	Sanana	0.659 (Medium)
7	Taliabu Island	Bobong	0.629 (Medium)
8	West Halmahera	Jailolo	0.675 (Medium)
No	City		HDI (2024)
1	Ternate		0.821 (Very High)
2	Tidore		0.729 (High)

=== Western New Guinea ===
==== West Papua ====
No	Regency	Capital	HDI (2024)
1	Fakfak	Fakfak	0.703 (High)
2	Kaimana	Kaimana	0.676 (Medium)
3	Manokwari	Manokwari	0.738 (High)
4	Arfak Mountains	Anggi	0.587 (Medium)
5	South Manokwari	Ransiki	0.624 (Medium)
6	Teluk Bintuni	Bintuni	0.667 (Medium)
7	Teluk Wondama	Rasiei	0.623 (Medium)

==== Papua ====
No	Regency	Capital	HDI (2024)
1	Biak Numfor	Biak	0.739 (High)
2	Jayapura	Sentani	0.741 (High)
3	Keerom	Waris	0.686 (Medium)
4	Mamberamo Raya	Burmeso	0.550 (Medium)
5	Sarmi	Sarmi	0.667 (Medium)
6	Supiori	Sorendiweri	0.651 (Medium)
7	Waropen	Botawa	0.669 (Medium)
8	Yapen Islands	Serui	0.696 (Medium)
No	City		HDI (2024)
1	Jayapura		0.816 (Very High)

==== Highland Papua ====
No	Regency	Capital	HDI (2024)
1	Central Mamberamo	Kobakma	0.507 (Low)
2	Jayawijaya	Wamena	0.610 (Medium)
3	Lanny Jaya	Tiom	0.515 (Low)
4	Nduga	Kenyam	0.363 (Low)
5	Pegunungan Bintang	Oksibil	0.493 (Low)
6	Tolikara	Karubaga	0.520 (Low)
7	Yahukimo	Dekai	0.519 (Low)
8	Yalimo	Elelim	0.518 (Low)

==== Central Papua ====
No	Regency	Capital	HDI (2024)
1	Deiyai	Waghete	0.520 (Low)
2	Dogiyai	Kigamani	0.576 (Medium)
3	Intan Jaya	Sugapa	0.507 (Low)
4	Mimika	Timika	0.768 (High)
5	Nabire	Nabire	0.717 (High)
6	Paniai	Enarotali	0.586 (Medium)
7	Puncak	Ilaga	0.456 (Low)
8	Puncak Jaya	Mulia	0.517 (Low)

==== South Papua ====
No	Regency	Capital	HDI (2024)
1	Asmat	Agats	0.539 (Low)
2	Boven Digoel	Tanah Merah	0.642 (Medium)
3	Mappi	Kepi	0.615 (Medium)
4	Merauke	Merauke	0.727 (High)

==== Southwest Papua ====
No	Regency	Capital	HDI (2024)
1	Maybrat	Kumurkek	0.618 (Medium)
2	Raja Ampat	Waisai	0.658 (Medium)
3	Sorong	Aimas	0.682 (Medium)
4	South Sorong	Teminabuan	0.645 (Medium)
5	Tambrauw	Fef	0.563 (Medium)
No	City		HDI (2024)
1	Sorong		0.799 (High)

== Superlatives ==
Superlatives of cities can be found at Indonesian Wikipedia articles Daftar kota di Indonesia menurut jumlah penduduk and Daftar kota di Indonesia menurut luas wilayah. Although the least populated regency in Indonesia according to various sources is said to be Tana Tidung Regency in North Kalimantan, Supiori Regency in Papua is included here instead because it has a smaller population of about 23 thousand people compared to 28 thousand people of Tana Tidung Regency.

	Regencies	Province	Cities	Province
Largest by area	Merauke Regency	South Papua	Palangka Raya	Central Kalimantan
Smallest by area	Administrative Regency of Thousand Islands	Jakarta	Sibolga	North Sumatra
Largest by population	Bogor Regency	West Java	East Jakarta	Jakarta
Smallest by population	Supiori Regency	Papua	Sabang	Aceh

== Subdivision splits ==
Following the Regional Autonomy Act (Indonesian: Undang-Undang Otonomi Daerah) of 1999, many regencies were split to create additional regencies and cities, the number of such divisions was thus increased to 514 by 2014. However, these territorial splits can sometimes lead into corruption cases. As at early 2024, all further proposals for territorial splits are still under a moratorium.

The latest new regencies split from existing regencies were South Buton Regency, Central Buton Regency and West Muna Regency in July 2014, while the latest cities were South Tangerang and Gunungsitoli in October 2008. There are no cities which have been split into other subdivisions, although the administrative regency of Thousand Islands was split from North Jakarta administrative city in 2001. Despite the name of South Tangerang being similar to that of Tangerang city, South Tangerang was actually split from Tangerang Regency.

In two special cases, all subdivisions of North Maluku and Riau Islands were made from parts of the defunct North Maluku Regency and Riau Islands Regency, respectively. All subdivisions of North Kalimantan are also made from lands of Bulungan Regency, but its area was split to several regencies before the province was established. Central Java (since 1965) and the Special Region of Yogyakarta (apart from the separation of the Thousand Islands Administrative Regency from North Jakarta City) are the only province-level areas which have not had any subdivision splits. Listed below are the subdivision splits from 1999 to the most recent ones in 2014; for pre-1999 splits see also main article in Indonesian Wikipedia.

=== 2014 ===
==== Southeast Sulawesi ====
- South Buton Regency from Buton Regency (23 July 2014)
- Central Buton Regency from Buton Regency (23 July 2014)
- West Muna Regency from Muna Regency (23 July 2014)

=== 2013 ===
==== South Sumatra ====
- North Musi Rawas Regency from Musi Rawas Regency (10 June 2013)

==== Central Sulawesi ====
- North Morowali Regency from Morowali Regency (12 April 2013)

==== Southeast Sulawesi ====
- Konawe Islands Regency from Konawe Regency (12 April 2013)

=== 2012 ===
==== South Sumatra ====
- Penukal Abab Lematang Ilir Regency from Muara Enim Regency (14 December 2012)

==== East Nusa Tenggara ====
- Malaka Regency from Belu Regency (14 December 2012)

==== East Kalimantan ====
- Mahakam Ulu Regency from West Kutai Regency (14 December 2012)

==== Central Sulawesi ====
- Banggai Laut Regency from Banggai Islands Regency (14 December 2012)

==== West Sulawesi ====
- Central Mamuju Regency from Mamuju Regency (14 December 2012)

==== Southeast Sulawesi ====
- East Kolaka Regency from Kolaka Regency (14 December 2012)

==== North Maluku ====
- Taliabu Island Regency from Sula Islands Regency (14 December 2012)

==== Lampung ====
- Pesisir Barat Regency from West Lampung Regency (25 October 2012)

==== West Java ====
- Pangandaran Regency from Ciamis Regency (25 October 2012)

==== West Papua ====
- South Manokwari Regency and Arfak Mountains Regency from Manokwari Regency (25 October 2012)

=== 2008 ===
==== North Sumatra ====
- Gunungsitoli city from Nias Regency (29 October 2008)
- North Nias Regency from Nias Regency (29 October 2008)
- West Nias Regency from Nias Regency (29 October 2008)
- North Labuhan Batu Regency from Labuhan Batu Regency (24 June 2008)
- South Labuhan Batu Regency from Labuhan Batu Regency (24 June 2008)

==== Jambi ====
- Sungai Penuh from Kerinci Regency (24 June 2008)

==== Riau ====
- Meranti Islands Regency from Bengkalis Regency (19 December 2008)

==== Bengkulu ====
- Central Bengkulu Regency from North Bengkulu Regency (24 June 2008)

==== Lampung ====
- Mesuji Regency from Tulang Bawang Regency (29 October 2008)
- West Tulang Bawang Regency from Tulang Bawang Regency (29 October 2008)
- Pringsewu Regency from Tanggamus Regency (29 October 2008)

==== Riau Islands ====
- Anambas Islands Regency from Natuna Regency (24 June 2008)

==== Banten ====
- South Tangerang city from Tangerang Regency (29 October 2008)

==== West Nusa Tenggara ====
- North Lombok Regency from West Lombok Regency (24 June 2008)

==== East Nusa Tenggara ====
- Sabu Raijua Regency from Kupang Regency (29 October 2008)

==== North Sulawesi ====
- East Bolaang Mongondow Regency from Bolaang Mongondow Regency (24 June 2008)
- South Bolaang Mongondow Regency from Bolaang Mongondow Regency (24 June 2008)

==== Central Sulawesi ====
- Sigi Regency from Donggala Regency (24 June 2008)

==== South Sulawesi ====
- North Toraja Regency from Tana Toraja Regency (24 June 2008)

==== Maluku ====
- South Buru Regency from Buru Regency (24 June 2008)
- Southwest Maluku Regency from Western Southeast Maluku Regency (Tanimbar Islands Regency) (24 June 2008)

==== North Maluku ====
- Morotai Island Regency from North Halmahera Regency (29 October 2008)

==== West Papua ====
- Tambrauw Regency from Sorong Regency, South Sorong Regency and Manokwari Regency (29 October 2008)
- Maybrat Regency from Sorong Regency (19 December 2008)

==== Papua ====
- Lanny Jaya Regency, Central Mamberamo Regency, Nduga Regency and Yalimo Regency from Jayawijaya Regency (4 January 2008)
- Puncak Regency from Puncak Jaya Regency (4 January 2008)
- Dogiyai Regency from Nabire Regency (4 January 2008)
- Deiyai Regency and Intan Jaya Regency from Paniai Regency (29 October 2008)

=== 2007 ===
==== Aceh ====
- Subulussalam from Aceh Singkil Regency (2 January 2007)
- Pidie Jaya Regency from Pidie Regency (2 January 2007)

==== North Sumatra ====
- Batubara Regency from Asahan Regency (2 January 2007)
- Padang Lawas Regency and North Padang Lawas Regency from South Tapanuli Regency (17 July 2007)

==== South Sumatra ====
- Empat Lawang Regency from Lahat Regency (2 January 2007)

==== Lampung ====
- Pesawaran Regency from South Lampung Regency (17 July 2007)

==== Banten ====
- Serang from Serang Regency (17 July 2007)

==== West Java ====
- West Bandung Regency from Bandung Regency (2 January 2007)

==== East Nusa Tenggara ====
- Nagekeo Regency from Ngada Regency (2 January 2007)
- Central Sumba Regency and Southwest Sumba Regency from West Sumba Regency (2 January 2007)
- East Manggarai Regency from Manggarai Regency (17 July 2007)

==== West Kalimantan ====
- Kubu Raya Regency from Pontianak Regency (Mempawah Regency) (17 July 2007)

==== North Kalimantan ====
- Tana Tidung Regency from Bulungan Regency (17 July 2007)

==== North Sulawesi ====
- Kotamobagu and North Bolaang Mongondow Regency from Bolaang Mongondow Regency (2 January 2007)
- Siau Tagulandang Biaro Islands Regency from Sangihe Islands Regency (2 January 2007)
- Southeast Minahasa Regency from South Minahasa Regency (2 January 2007)

==== Gorontalo ====
- North Gorontalo Regency from Gorontalo Regency (2 January 2007)

==== Southeast Sulawesi ====
- North Konawe Regency from Konawe Regency (2 January 2007)
- North Buton Regency from Muna Regency (2 January 2007)

==== Maluku ====
- Tual from Southeast Maluku Regency (17 July 2007)

==== Papua ====
- Mamberamo Raya Regency from Sarmi Regency (15 March 2007)

=== 2003 ===
==== Aceh ====
- Bener Meriah Regency from Aceh Tengah Regency (18 December 2003)

==== North Sumatra ====
- Nias Selatan Regency from Nias Regency (25 February 2003)
- Pakpak Bharat Regency from Dairi Regency (25 February 2003)
- Humbang Hasundutan Regency from Tapanuli Utara Regency (25 February 2003)
- Samosir Regency from Toba Samosir Regency (18 December 2003)
- Serdang Bedagai Regency from Deli Serdang Regency (18 December 2003)

==== West Sumatra ====
- Dharmasraya Regency from Sawahlunto Sijunjung Regency (18 December 2003)
- Solok Selatan Regency from Solok Regency (18 December 2003)
- Pasaman Barat Regency from Pasaman Regency (18 December 2003)

==== Riau Islands ====
- Lingga Regency from Bintan Regency (18 December 2003)

==== Bengkulu ====
- Mukomuko Regency from Bengkulu Utara Regency (25 February 2003)
- Seluma Regency from Bengkulu Selatan Regency (25 February 2003)
- Kaur Regency from Bengkulu Selatan Regency (25 February 2003)
- Lebong Regency from Rejang Lebong Regency (18 December 2003)
- Kepahiang Regency from Rejang Lebong Regency (18 December 2003)

==== South Sumatra ====
- Ogan Komering Ulu Timur Regency from Ogan Komering Ulu Regency (18 December 2003)
- Ogan Komering Ulu Selatan Regency from Ogan Komering Ulu Regency (18 December 2003)
- Ogan Ilir Regency from Ogan Komering Ilir Regency (18 December 2003)

==== Bangka Belitung Islands ====
- Bangka Selatan Regency from Bangka Regency (25 February 2003)
- Bangka Tengah Regency from Bangka Regency (25 February 2003)
- Bangka Barat Regency from Bangka Regency (25 February 2003)
- Belitung Timur Regency from Belitung Regency (25 February 2003)

==== West Nusa Tenggara ====
- West Sumbawa Regency from Sumbawa Regency (18 December 2003)

==== East Nusa Tenggara ====
- West Manggarai Regency from Manggarai Regency (25 February 2003)

==== West Kalimantan ====
- Melawi Regency from Sintang Regency (18 December 2003)
- Sekadau Regency from Sanggau Regency (18 December 2003)

==== South Kalimantan ====
- Tanah Bumbu Regency from Kotabaru Regency (25 February 2003)
- Balangan Regency from North Hulu Sungai Regency (25 February 2003)

==== North Sulawesi ====
- South Minahasa Regency from Minahasa Regency (25 February 2003)
- Tomohon from Minahasa Regency (25 February 2003)
- North Minahasa Regency from Minahasa Regency (18 December 2003)

==== Gorontalo ====
- Bone Bolango Regency from Gorontalo Regency (25 February 2003)
- Pohuwato Regency from Boalemo Regency (25 February 2003)

==== Central Sulawesi ====
- Tojo Una-Una Regency from Poso Regency (18 December 2003)

==== West Sulawesi ====
- Pasangkayu Regency from Mamuju Regency (25 February 2003)

==== South Sulawesi ====
- East Luwu Regency from North Luwu Regency (25 February 2003)

==== Southeast Sulawesi ====
- South Konawe Regency from Kendari Regency (25 February 2003)
- Bombana Regency from Buton Regency (18 December 2003)
- Wakatobi Regency from Buton Regency (18 December 2003)
- North Kolaka Regency from Kolaka Regency (18 December 2003)

==== Maluku ====
- East Seram Regency from Central Maluku Regency (18 December 2003)
- West Seram Regency from Central Maluku Regency (18 December 2003)
- Aru Islands Regency from Southeast Maluku Regency (18 December 2003)

==== North Maluku ====
- North Halmahera Regency from North Maluku Regency (25 February 2003)
- South Halmahera Regency from North Maluku Regency (25 February 2003)
- Sula Islands Regency from North Maluku Regency (25 February 2003)
- East Halmahera Regency from Central Halmahera Regency (25 February 2003)
- Tidore Islands from Central Halmahera Regency (25 February 2003)

==== Papua ====
- Supiori Regency from Biak Numfor Regency (18 December 2003)

=== 2002 ===
==== Aceh ====
- Aceh Barat Daya Regency from Aceh Selatan Regency (10 April 2002)
- Gayo Lues Regency from Aceh Tenggara Regency (10 April 2002)
- Aceh Jaya Regency from Aceh Barat Regency (10 April 2002)
- Nagan Raya Regency from Aceh Barat Regency (10 April 2002)
- Aceh Tamiang Regency from Aceh Timur Regency (10 April 2002)

==== West Sumatra ====
- Pariaman from Padang Pariaman Regency (10 April 2002)

==== South Sumatra ====
- Banyuasin Regency from Musi Banyuasin Regency (10 April 2002)

==== West Java ====
- Banjar from Ciamis Regency (25 October 2002)

==== West Nusa Tenggara ====
- Bima from Bima Regency (10 April 2002)

==== Central Kalimantan ====
- Katingan Regency from East Kotawaringin Regency (10 April 2002)
- Seruyan Regency from East Kotawaringin Regency (10 April 2002)
- Sukamara Regency from West Kotawaringin Regency (10 April 2002)
- Lamandau Regency from West Kotawaringin Regency (10 April 2002)
- Gunung Mas Regency from Kapuas Regency (10 April 2002)
- Pulang Pisau Regency from Kapuas Regency (10 April 2002)
- Murung Raya Regency from North Barito Regency (10 April 2002)
- East Barito Regency from South Barito Regency (10 April 2002)

==== East Kalimantan ====
- Penajam North Paser Regency from Paser Regency (10 April 2002)

==== North Sulawesi ====
- Talaud Islands Regency from Sangihe Islands Regency (10 April 2002)

==== Central Sulawesi ====
- Parigi Moutong Regency from Donggala Regency (10 April 2002)

==== West Sulawesi ====
- Mamasa Regency from Polewali Mamasa Regency (10 April 2002)

==== South Sulawesi ====
- Palopo from Luwu Regency (10 April 2002)

==== West Papua ====
(including current Southwest Papua province)

- Kaimana Regency from Fak-Fak Regency (25 October 2002)
- Teluk Bintuni Regency from Manokwari Regency (25 October 2002)
- Teluk Wondama Regency from Manokwari Regency (25 October 2002)
- South Sorong Regency from Sorong Regency (11 December 2002)
- Raja Ampat Regency from Sorong Regency (11 December 2002)

==== Papua ====
(including current Highland Papua and South Papua provinces)

- Sarmi Regency from Jayapura Regency (11 December 2002)
- Keerom Regency from Jayapura Regency (11 December 2002)
- Waropen Regency from Yapen Waropen Regency (11 December 2002)
- Bintang Mountains Regency from Jayawijaya Regency (11 December 2002)
- Yahukimo Regency from Jayawijaya Regency (11 December 2002)
- Tolikara Regency from Jayawijaya Regency (11 December 2002)
- Boven Digoel Regency from Merauke Regency (11 December 2002)
- Mappi Regency from Merauke Regency (11 December 2002)
- Asmat Regency from Merauke Regency (11 December 2002)

=== 2001 ===
==== Aceh ====
- Lhokseumawe from Aceh Utara Regency (21 June 2001)
- Langsa from Aceh Timur Regency (21 June 2001)

==== North Sumatra ====
- Padang Sidempuan from Tapanuli Selatan Regency (21 June 2001)

==== Riau Islands ====
- Tanjung Pinang from Bintan Regency (21 June 2001)

==== South Sumatra ====
- Prabumulih from Muara Enim Regency (21 June 2001)
- Lubuklinggau from Musi Rawas Regency (21 June 2001)
- Pagar Alam from Lahat Regency (21 June 2001)

==== DKI Jakarta ====
- Seribu Regency from North Jakarta (3 July 2001)

==== West Java ====
- Cimahi from Bandung Regency (21 June 2001)
- Tasikmalaya from Tasikmalaya Regency (21 June 2001)

==== East Java ====
- Kota Batu from Malang Regency (21 June 2001)

==== West Kalimantan ====
- Singkawang from Bengkayang Regency (21 June 2001)

==== Southeast Sulawesi ====
- Bau-Bau from Buton Regency (21 June 2001)

=== 1999 ===
==== Aceh ====
- Aceh Singkil Regency from South Aceh Regency (20 April 1999)
- Simeulue Regency from West Aceh Regency (4 October 1999)
- Bireuen Regency from North Aceh Regency (4 October 1999)

==== West Sumatra ====
- Mentawai Islands Regency from Padang Pariaman Regency (4 October 1999)

==== Riau ====
(including the current Riau Islands Province, separated in 2002)

- Pelalawan Regency from Kampar Regency (4 October 1999)
- Rokan Hulu Regency from Kampar Regency (4 October 1999)
- Rokan Hilir Regency from Bengkalis Regency (4 October 1999)
- Siak Regency from Bengkalis Regency (4 October 1999)
- Kuantan Singingi Regency from Indragiri Hulu Regency (4 October 1999)
- Dumai from Bengkalis Regency (4 October 1999)
- Karimun Regency from Bintan Regency (4 October 1999)
- Natuna Regency from Bintan Regency (4 October 1999)
- Batam from Bintan Regency (4 October 1999)

==== Jambi ====
- Muaro Jambi Regency from Batanghari Regency (4 October 1999)
- Sarolangun Regency and Merangin Regency from Sarolangun Bangko Regency (4 October 1999)
- East Tanjung Jabung Regency and West Tanjung Jabung Regency from Tanjung Jabung Regency (4 October 1999)
- Tebo Regency and Bungo Regency from Bungo Tebo Regency (4 October 1999)

==== Lampung ====
- Way Kanan Regency from North Lampung Regency (20 April 1999)
- East Lampung Regency from Central Lampung Regency (20 April 1999)
- Metro (city) from Central Lampung Regency (20 April 1999)

==== West Java ====
(including current Banten Province, created 2000)

- Cilegon from Serang Regency (20 April 1999)
- Depok from Bogor Regency (27 April 1999)

==== East Nusa Tenggara ====
- Lembata Regency from East Flores Regency (4 October 1999)

==== West Kalimantan ====
- Bengkayang Regency from Sambas Regency (20 April 1999)
- Landak Regency from Mempawah Regency (4 October 1999)

==== South Kalimantan ====
- Banjarbaru from Banjar Regency (20 April 1999)

==== East Kalimantan ====
(including current North Kalimantan Regency)

- West Kutai Regency from Kutai Regency (4 October 1999)
- East Kutai Regency from Kutai Regency (4 October 1999)
- Bontang from Kutai Regency (4 October 1999)
- Malinau Regency from Bulungan Regency (4 October 1999)
- Nunukan Regency from Bulungan Regency (4 October 1999)

==== Gorontalo ====
- Boalemo Regency from Gorontalo Regency (4 October 1999)

==== Central Sulawesi ====
- Buol Regency from Buol Toli-Toli Regency (4 October 1999)
- Morowali Regency from Poso Regency (4 October 1999)
- Banggai Islands Regency from Banggai Regency (4 October 1999)

==== South Sulawesi ====
- North Luwu Regency from Luwu Regency (20 April 1999)

==== Maluku ====
- Buru Regency from Central Maluku Regency (4 October 1999)
- Tanimbar Islands Regency from Southeast Maluku Regency (4 October 1999)

==== North Maluku ====
- Ternate from North Maluku Regency (20 April 1999)

==== West Papua ====
(in current Southwest Papua province)

- Sorong from Sorong Regency (4 October 1999)

==== Papua ====
(all in current Central Papua province)

- Paniai Regency from Nabire Regency (4 October 1999)
- Puncak Jaya Regency from Nabire Regency (4 October 1999)
- Mimika Regency from Fak-Fak Regency (4 October 1999)

== Former regencies ==
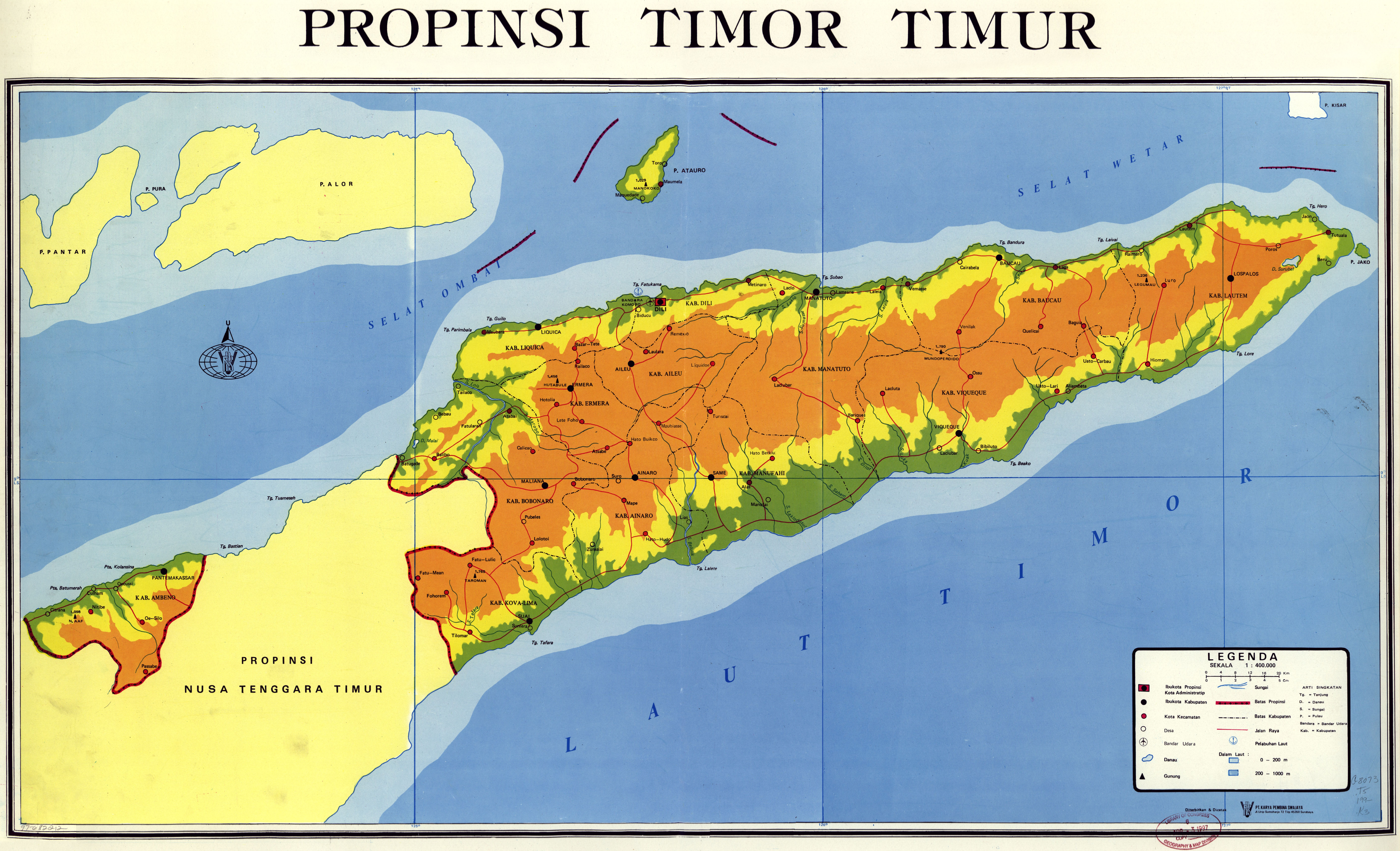
Regencies of East Timor Province c. 1990s

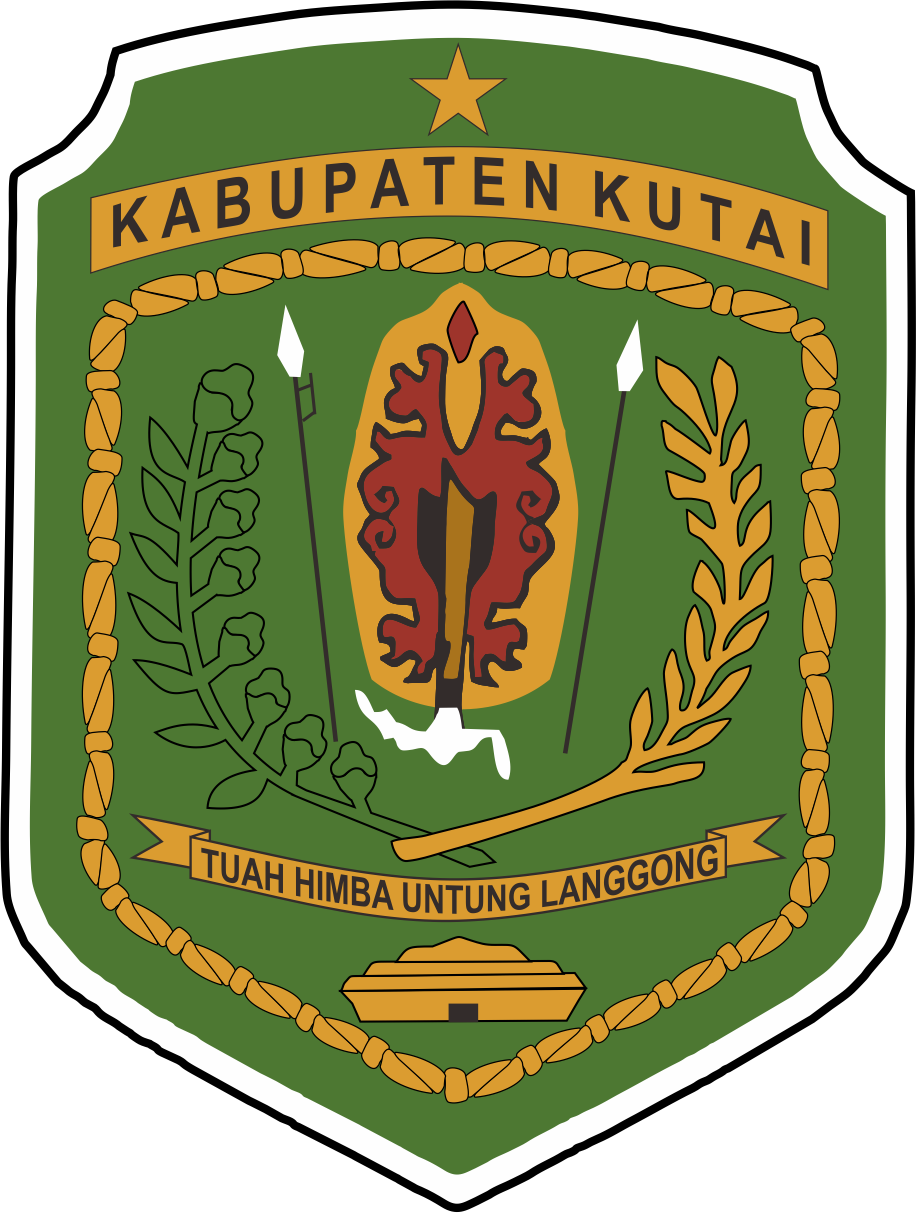
Emblem of Kutai Regency, until the regency was renamed to Kutai Kartanegara Regency in 2002.

These regencies became defunct either by splitting their territory together, or by being renamed. This list does not include colonial-era regencies, or former regencies of the former province of East Timor.

Former regency's name	Fate
Toba Samosir Regency (−2020)	Renamed to Toba Regency
Western Southeast Maluku Regency (1999–2019)	Renamed to Tanimbar Islands Regency
North Mamuju Regency (2003–2018)	Renamed to Pasangkayu Regency
Pontianak Regency (−2014)	Renamed to Mempawah Regency
Surabaya Regency (–1974)	Renamed to Gresik Regency
Riau Islands Regency (−2006)	Split into 3 in 1999 and one each in 2001 and 2003, later changed name to Bintan Regency
North Maluku Regency (−2003)	Split into 4 regencies and cities
Kutai Regency (−2002)	Split into 4 regencies and cities in 1999, later renamed to Kutai Kartanegara Regency
Sarolangun Bangko Regency (−1999)	Split into Sarolangun Regency and Merangin Regency
Bungo Tebo Regency (−1999)	Split into Bungo Regency and Tebo Regency
Tanjung Jabung Regency (−1999)	Split into West Tanjung Jabung Regency and East Tanjung Jabung Regency
Buol Toli-Toli Regency (−1999)	Split into Buol Regency and Toli-Toli Regency
Adikarto Regency (−1951)	Merged into Kulon Progo Regency
Hulu Sungai Regency (−1959)	Split into South Hulu Sungai Regency, Central Hulu Sungai Regency and North Hulu Sungai Regency
Barito Regency (−1959)	Split into North Barito Regency and South Barito Regency
Kotawaringin Regency (−1959)	Split into West Kotawaringin Regency and East Kotawaringin Regency

== See also ==
- List of Indonesian cities by population
- List of Indonesian regencies by population
