= Bolaang =

Bolaang is the name of four places in Indonesia:

- Bolaang Mongondow Regency
- East Bolaang Mongondow Regency
- North Bolaang Mongondow Regency
- South Bolaang Mongondow Regency
