= Johan Anuar =

Indonesian politician (1965–2022)

Regent of Ogan Komering Ulu (acting)
- In office 8 March 2021 – 8 March 2021
- Preceded by: Kuryana Azis
- Succeeded by: Edward Chandra

Deputy Regent of Ogan Komering Ulu
- In office 17 February 2016 – 8 March 2021
- Preceded by: Kuryana Azis

Personal details
- Born: 7 August 1965 Baturaja, South Sumatra Indonesia
- Died: 10 January 2022 (aged 56) Palembang, South Sumatra, Indonesia
- Party: Golkar

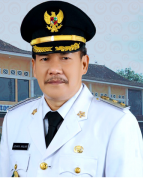

Johan Anuar (7 August 1965 – 10 January 2022) was an Indonesian politician. A member of the Golkar party, he served as Deputy Regent of Ogan Komering Ulu from 2016 to 2021 and served as Regent for one day, 8 March 2021, following the death of Kuryana Azis. He died of cancer in Palembang on 10 January 2022, at the age of 56.
