= Kuryana Azis =

Indonesian politician (1952–2021)

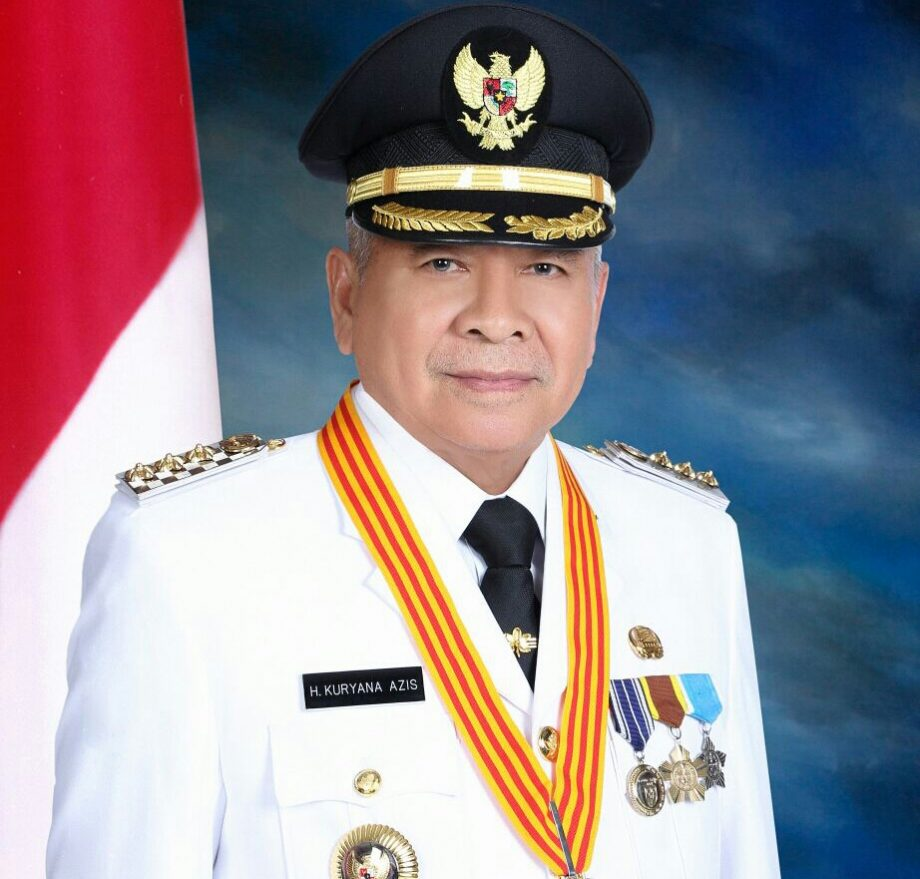
Azis

Kuryana Azis (10 April 1952 – 8 March 2021) was an Indonesian politician.

== Biography ==
He was born in Tanjung Kemala, Baturaja, Ogan Komering Ulu, South Sumatra.

He was the regent of Ogan Komering Ulu from 2015 until his death on 8 March 2021, due to COVID-19 during the COVID-19 pandemic in Indonesia.
