= Poigar =

District in North Sulawesi, Indonesia

- District
- Interactive map of Poigar
- Coordinates: 0°59′44.4617″N 124°16′56.1162″E
- Country: Indonesia
- Province: North Sulawesi
- Regency: Bolaang Mongondow
- District seat: Poigar

Area
  - Total: 251.0 km^{2} (96.9 sq mi)

Population (2020)
  - Total: 18,754
  - Density: 74.72/km^{2} (193.5/sq mi)
- Time zone: UTC+8 (WITA)
- Postal code: 95753
- Villages: 20

Poigar is an administrative district (kecamatan) in Bolaang Mongondow Regency, North Sulawesi, Indonesia. According to the 2020 census, it has a population of 18,754 people.

== Geography ==
Poigar district is divided into 20 villages (desa), namely:

- Gogaluman
- Mariri Baru
- Mariri I
- Mariri II
- Mariri Lama
- Mondatong
- Mondatong Baru
- Nanasi
- Nanasi Timur
- Nonapan
- Nonapan Baru
- Nonapan I
- Nonapan II
- Poigar
- Poigar II
- Poigar III
- Pomoman
- Tanjung Mariri
- Tiberias
- Wineru
