= Lolayan =

District in North Sulawesi, Indonesia

- District
- Interactive map of Lolayan
- Coordinates: 0°40′55″N 124°16′29″E
- Country: Indonesia
- Province: North Sulawesi
- Regency: Bolaang Mongondow
- District seat: Tungoi I

Area
  - Total: 260.4 km^{2} (100.5 sq mi)

Population (2020)
  - Total: 26,243
  - Density: 100.8/km^{2} (261.0/sq mi)
- Time zone: UTC+8 (WITA)
- Postal code: 95737

Lolayan is an administrative district (kecamatan) in Bolaang Mongondow Regency, North Sulawesi, Indonesia. According to the 2020 census, it has a population of 26,243 people.

== Geography ==
Lolayan district is divided into 14 villages (desa), namely:

- Abak
- Bakan
- Bombanon
- Kopandakan II
- Lolayan
- Matali Baru
- Mengkang
- Mopait
- Mopusi
- Tanoyan Selatan
- Tanoyan Utara
- Tapa Aog
- Tungoi I
- Tungoi II
