= Kotawaringin Sultanate =

1949–1950 autonomous community of Indonesia in southwest Borneo

Flag of the Kotawaringin Sultanate.

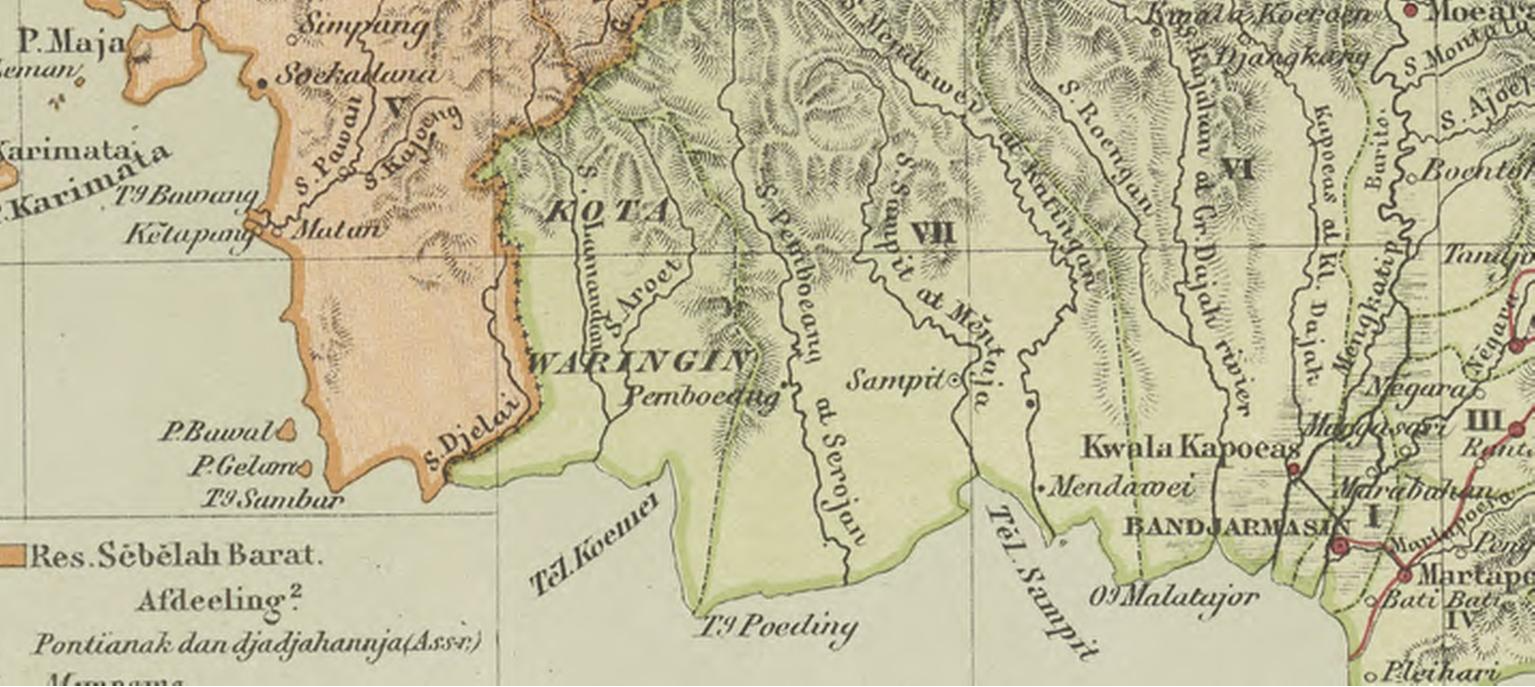
Section of a map of Borneo showing Kotawaringin in a 1909 school atlas

Kotawaringin, or also spelled Kota Waringin, was a sultanate on the south coast of Borneo. It covered an area in what is now the western part of the Indonesian province of Central Kalimantan. Its capital was the historic town of Waringin (or "Kota Waringin Lama"), situated to the northwest of Pangkalan Bun and on the east bank of the Lamandau River. It then had a brief existence as an autonomous "native state" in the United States of Indonesia between 1949 and 1950, before being formally created as a separate Kotawaringin Regency within what was then the Province of South Kalimantan (from which the western part, then consisting of three regencies — the kabupaten of Barito, Kapuas, and Kotawaringin, was split off in 1957 to form the new Central Kalimantan province). However, on 26 June 1959, Kotawaringin Regency was divided into a West Kotawaringin Regency and East Kotawaringin Regency.

== Former territory ==
On 10 April 2002 additional regencies were created by splitting the two existing regencies — Sukamara and Lamandau from parts of West Kotawaringin Regency, and Seruyan and Katingan from parts of East Kotawaringin Regency.

In recent years, there has been some research into local attitudes, with a view to the putative re-establishment of Kotawaringin as a separate province, separate from the rest of Central Kalimantan, based upon the recognition of a shared identity of "Orang Kotawaringin". Such a province would cover an area of some 71,552 km^{2} and would have a population as at mid 2025 of some 1.264 million people.

Kode Wilayah	Name of Regency	Area in km^{2}	Pop'n 2010 Census	Pop'n 2020 Census	Pop'n mid 2025 Estimate
62.01	West Kotawaringin	9,475.85	235,803	270,388	285,737
62.02	East Kotawaringin	15,541.88	374,175	428,895	452,867
62.08	Sukamara Regency	3,310.13	44,952	63,464	68,978
62.09	Lamandau Regency	7,632.39	63,199	97,611	105,206
62.07	Seruyan Regency	15,211.71	139,931	162,906	177,322
62.06	Katingan Regency	20,380.50	146,439	162,222	174,341
	Totals	71,552.48	1,004,499	1,185,486	1,264,451

== See also ==
- East Kotawaringin Regency
- West Kotawaringin Regency
