= Nias Regency =

Regency in North Sumatra, Indonesia

Coordinates: 0.7700°N 97.7500°E

Nias Regency Kabupaten Nias
- Regency
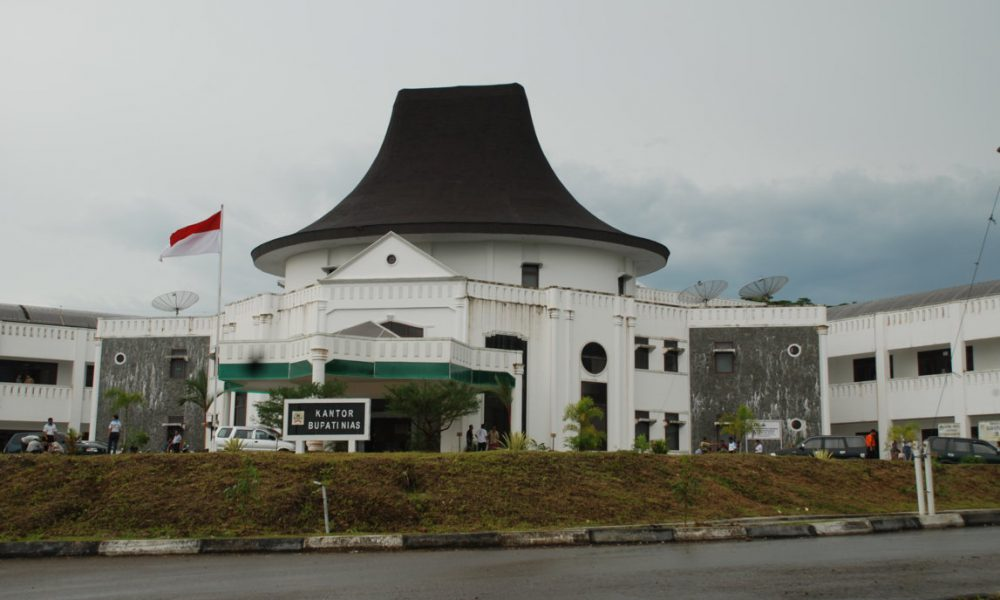
- Nia's Regent office

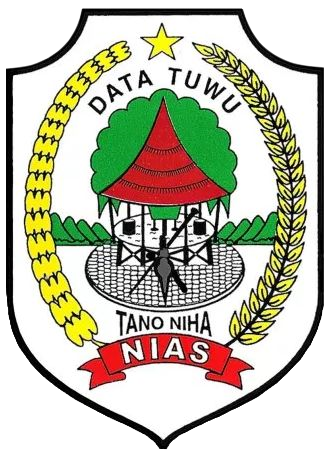
- Coat of arms
- Motto: Data tuwu tano Niha (Unite to build the land of Nias)
- Country: Indonesia
- Province: North Sumatra
- Regency seat: Gido

Government
  - Regent: Ya'atulö Gulö
  - Vice Regent: Arota Lase
  - Chairman of Council of Representatives: Alinuru Laoli (Partai Demokrat)
  - Vice Chairmen of Council of Representatives: Sabayuti Gulö (PDI-P) and Ameyunus Zai (Golkar)

Area
  - Total: 853.42 km^{2} (329.51 sq mi)

Population (mid 2025 estimate)
  - Total: 148,694
  - Density: 174.23/km^{2} (451.26/sq mi)
- Time zone: UTC+7 (WIB)
- Website: niaskab.go.id

Nias Regency is a regency in North Sumatra province, Indonesia; it lies on the east side of Nias Island. The regency originally covered the entire island, but was reduced to the northern half, with an area of 3,495.39 square kilometres, following the creation of the new regency of South Nias on 25 February 2003. It was further reduced by the creation of the new regencies of North Nias (Kabupaten Nias Utara) and West Nias (Kabupaten Nias Barat) and the independent municipality of Gunungsitoli from other parts of Nias Regency on 29 October 2008. Since the separation of the new regencies and municipality, the reduced Regency now covers 853.42 km^{2} of land in the eastern part of the island (partly surrounding the coastal city of Gunungsitoli), and had a population of 131,377 at the 2010 Census and 146,672 at the 2020 Census; the official estimate as of mid 2025 was 148,694 (comprising 72,703 males and 75,991 females). Its administrative centre is the town of Gido.

== Administration ==
The regency was previously divided administratively into 32 districts (kecamatan). However, following the creation on 29 October 2008 of the new North Nias Regency, West Nias Regency and the newly independent city of Gunungsitoli, the residual Nias Regency was composed of only nine districts, although a tenth district (Sogaeadu) was created in 2012 from part of Gido district. These districts are tabulated below with their areas (in km^{2}) and their 2010 Census and 2020 Census populations, together with the official estimates as of mid 2025. The table also includes the locations of the district administrative centres, the number of administrative villages (all classed as rural desa) in each district, and its postal code.

Kode Wilayah	Name of District (kecamatan)	Area in km^{2}	Pop'n Census 2010	Pop'n Census 2020	Pop'n Estimate mid 2025	Admin centre	No. of villages	Post code
12.04.05	Hiliduho	65.08	9,126	9,830	9,886	Hiliduho	16	22854
12.04.06	Gido	110.05	31,660	23,326	24,254	Hiliweto	21	22871
12.04.10	Idanogawo	138.66	25,675	26,967	27,755	Tetehosi	28	22872
12.04.11	Bawolato	204.46	22,965	25,113	26,124	Sisarahili Bawolato	25	22876
12.04.20	Hiliserangkai	61.92	7,583	12,676	12,554	Dahadano Botombawo	15	22850
12.04.21	Botomuzoi	59.98	9,042	9,678	9,583	Hiliwa'ele I	18	22815
12.04.27	Ulugawo	65.97	9,740	10,191	10,233	Holi	14	22861
12/04.28	Ma'u	61.19	9,424	10,584	10,250	Lasara Siwalubanua	11	22855
12.04.29	Somolo-molo	44.85	6,162	6,558	6,485	Somolo-molo	11	22871
12.04.35	Sogae'adu	41.27	^{(a)}	11,749	11,570	Sogae'adu	11	22871
	Totals	853.42	131,377	146,672	148,694	Gido	170	

Note: (a) the population of Songaeadu District in 2010 is included with the figure for Gido District (from which it was split in 2012).
