= East Bolaang Mongondow Regency =

Regency in North Sulawesi, Indonesia

Coordinates: 0°46′12″N 124°36′50″E

East Bolaang Mongondow Regency Kabupaten Bolaang Mongondow Timur
- Regency
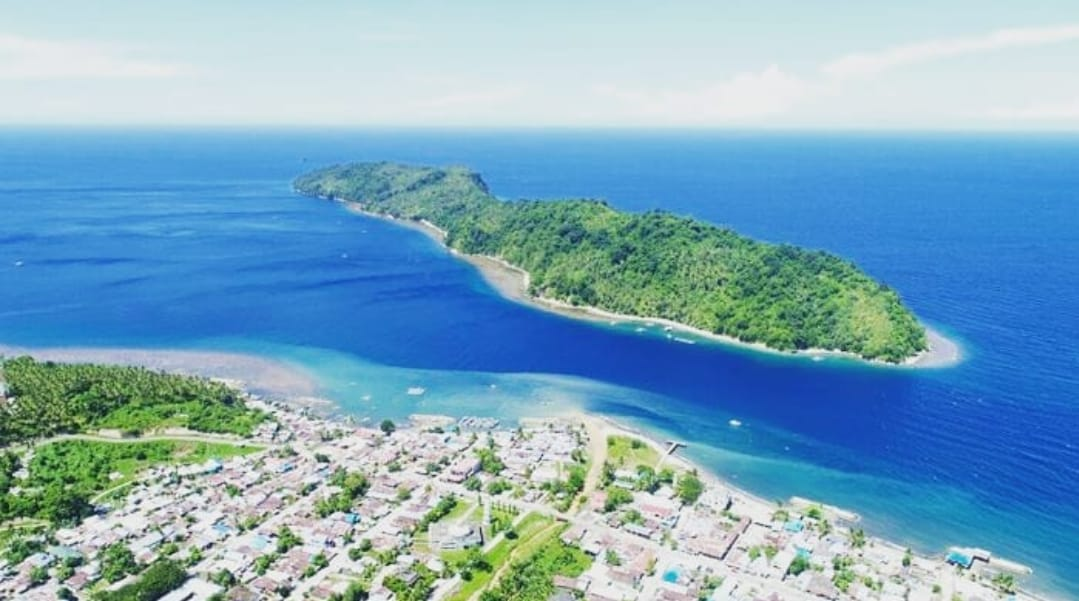
- Kotabunan Village in East Bolaang Mongondow Regency

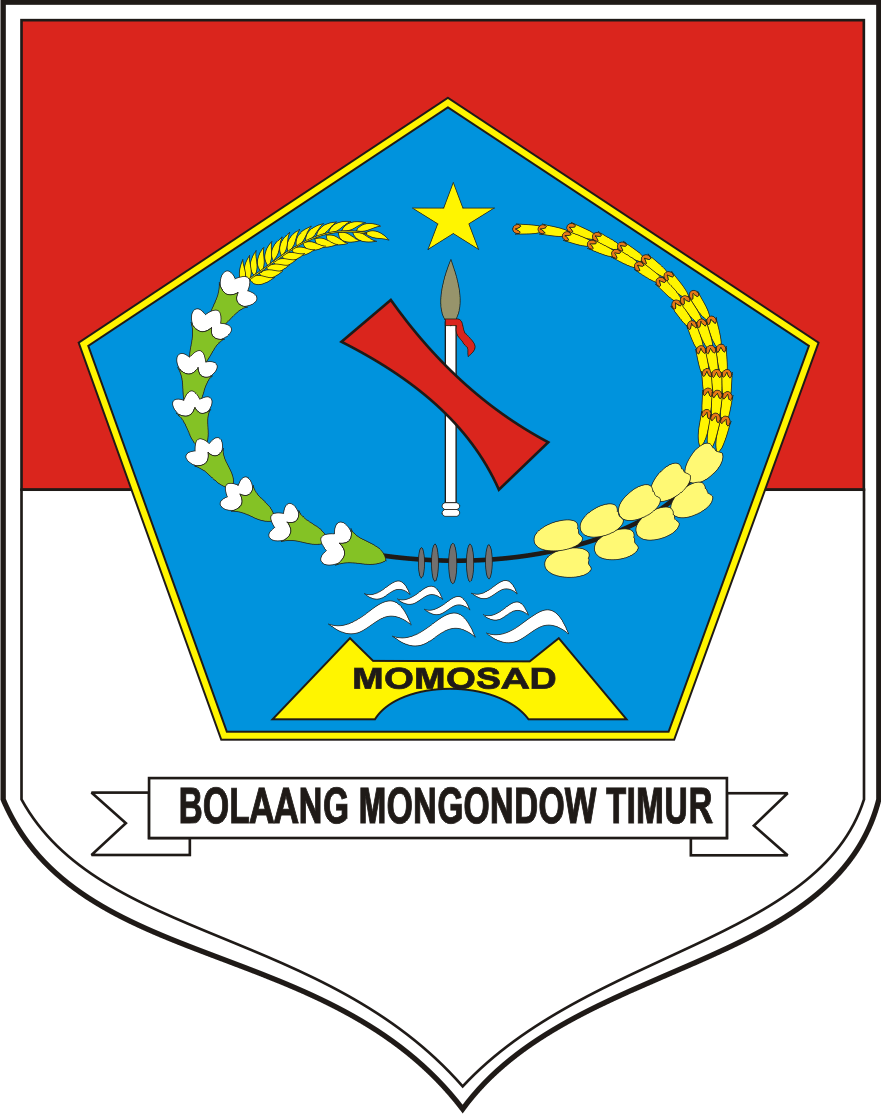
- Coat of arms

- Country: Indonesia
- Province: North Sulawesi
- Capital: Tutuyan

Government
  - Regent: Oskar Manoppo
  - Vice Regent: Argo Vinsensius Sumaiku

Area
  - Total: 866.37 km^{2} (334.51 sq mi)

Population (mid 2025 estimate)
  - Total: 92,148
  - Density: 106.36/km^{2} (275.47/sq mi)
- Time zone: UTC+7 (WIB)
- Website: boltimkab.go.id

East Bolaang Mongondow Regency is a regency of North Sulawesi Province of Indonesia. It was created on 24 June 2008 by splitting off districts which were previously the eastern part of Bolaang Mongondow Regency. It covers a land area of 866.37 sq km and had a population of 63,654 at the 2010 Census, rising to 87,241 at the 2020 Census; the official estimate as at mid 2025 was 92,148 (comprising 48,050 males and 44,098 females). The principal town lies at Tutuyan.

== Administration ==
At the time of the 2010 Census, the Regency was divided into five districts (kecamatan). However in 2016 two additional districts were created - Mooat District and Motongkad District. The districts are tabulated below with their areas and their populations at the 2010 Census and the 2020 Census, together with the official estimates as at mid 2025. The table also includes the locations of the district administrative centres, the numbers of administrative villages (all classed as rural desa) in each district, and its postal code.

Kode Wilayah	Name of District (kecamatan)	Area in km^{2}	Pop'n Census 2010	Pop'n Census 2020	Pop'n Estimate mid 2025	Admin centre	No. of villages	Post code
71.10.03	Nuangan ^{(a)}	133.81	12,935	10,269	10,673	Nuangan	11	95786
71.10.06	Motongkad	122.67	^{(b)}	7,935	8,211	Motongkad	11	95785
71.10.01	Tutuyan	156.30	11,224	15,484	15,980	Tutuyan	10	95783
71.10.02	Kotabunan ^{(c)}	133.83	11,003	16,005	17,306	Kotabunan	15	95782
71.10.04	Modayag	190.06	18,613	18,847	19,071	Modayag III	14	95780
71.10.07	Mooat ^{(d)}	92.28	^{(e)}	6,956	7,426	Mooat	10	95784
71.10.05	Modayag Barat	37.43	9,879	12,745	13,481	Moyongkota	10	95781
	Totals	866.37	63,654	87,241	92,148	Tutuyan	81	

Notes: (a) including three offshore islands.
(b) the 2010 population of Motongkad District is included in the figure for Nuangan District, from which it was cut out in 2016.
(c) the most northerly district within the regency, including four offshore islands. (d) a Christian majority district.
(e) the 2010 population of Mooat District is included in the figure for Modayag District, from which it was cut out in 2016.

== Climate ==
Tutuyan, the seat of the regency has a tropical rainforest climate (Af) with moderate rainfall in August and September and heavy rainfall in the remaining months.

Climate data for Tutuyan
Month	Jan	Feb	Mar	Apr	May	Jun	Jul	Aug	Sep	Oct	Nov	Dec	Year
Mean daily maximum °C (°F)	29.7 (85.5)	29.7 (85.5)	30.0 (86.0)	30.8 (87.4)	30.8 (87.4)	30.8 (87.4)	30.7 (87.3)	31.3 (88.3)	31.6 (88.9)	31.5 (88.7)	31.1 (88.0)	30.1 (86.2)	30.7 (87.2)
Daily mean °C (°F)	26.0 (78.8)	26.0 (78.8)	26.3 (79.3)	26.6 (79.9)	26.8 (80.2)	26.7 (80.1)	26.6 (79.9)	26.8 (80.2)	26.8 (80.2)	26.7 (80.1)	26.9 (80.4)	26.3 (79.3)	26.5 (79.8)
Mean daily minimum °C (°F)	22.4 (72.3)	22.4 (72.3)	22.6 (72.7)	22.5 (72.5)	22.9 (73.2)	22.7 (72.9)	22.5 (72.5)	22.3 (72.1)	22.0 (71.6)	22.0 (71.6)	22.7 (72.9)	22.6 (72.7)	22.5 (72.4)
Average rainfall mm (inches)	269 (10.6)	217 (8.5)	213 (8.4)	207 (8.1)	200 (7.9)	173 (6.8)	134 (5.3)	95 (3.7)	93 (3.7)	132 (5.2)	207 (8.1)	232 (9.1)	2,172 (85.4)
Source: Climate-Data.org
