= East Kotawaringin Regency =

Regency in Central Kalimantan, Indonesia

East Kotawaringin Regency Kabupaten Kotawaringin Timur
- Regency
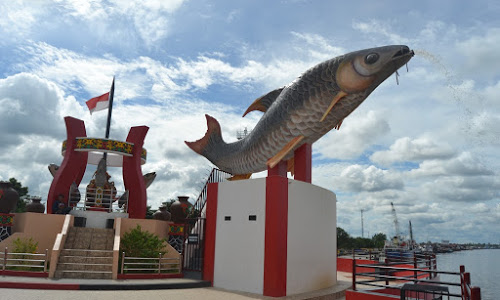
- Jelawat Fish Statue, Sampit

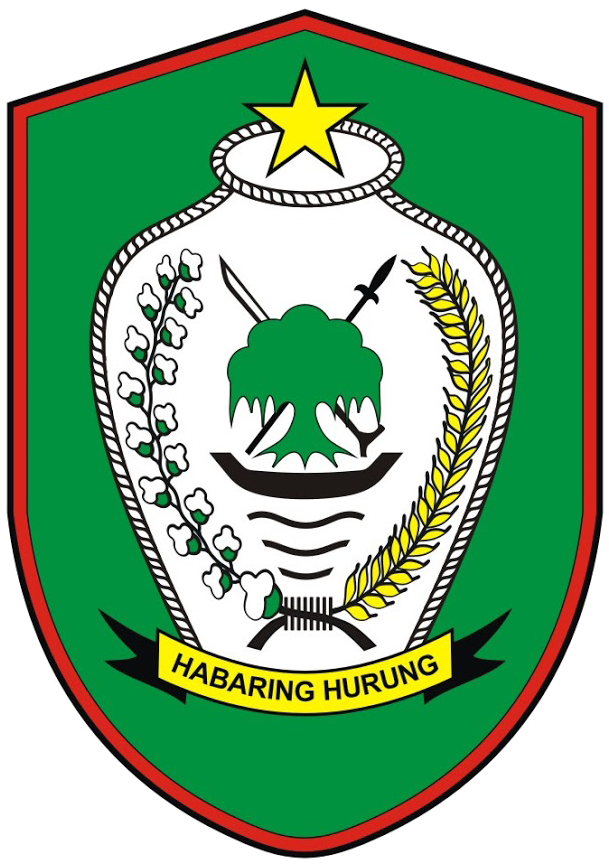
- Coat of arms
- Motto(s): "Habaring Hurung"; Ngaju language: "Mutual Cooperation and Assistance"
- Location within Central Kalimantan

- Location in Kalimantan and Indonesia East Kotawaringin Regency (Indonesia)
- Coordinates: 2.0833°S 112.7500°E
- Country: Indonesia
- Region: Kalimantan
- Province: Central Kalimantan
- Capital: Sampit

Government
  - Regent: Halikinnor
  - Vice Regent: Irawati

Area
  - Total: 15,543.82 km^{2} (6,001.50 sq mi)

Population (mid 2025 estimate)
  - Total: 452,870
  - Density: 29.135/km^{2} (75.459/sq mi)
- Time zone: UTC+7 (Western Indonesia Time)
- Area code: (+62) 531
- Website: kotimkab.go.id

East Kotawaringin Regency (Indonesian: Kabupaten Kotawaringin Timur) is one of the thirteen regencies which comprise the Central Kalimantan Province on the island of Kalimantan (Borneo), Indonesia. It originally covered a much larger part of the province, having been split from a single Kotawaringin Regency on 26 June 1959 into separate regencies for East and West Kotawaringin, but on 10 April 2002 several districts in the west of the regency were split off to form the new Seruyan Regency, and several districts in the east of the regency were similarly split off to form the new Katingan Regency. The land area of the residual East Kotawaringin Regency is 15,543.82 km^{2}, and its population was 374,175 at the 2010 Census, and 428,900 at the 2020 Census; the official estimate as at mid 2025 was 452,870 (comprising 233,500 males and 219,370 females). The town of Sampit is the capital of East Kotawaringin Regency.

== Geography ==
The residual regency is essentially the catchment area of the Mentaya (Sampit) River. The large town of Sampit (the administrative centre of the regency) lies on the west bank of the river; its metropolitan area encompasses most of Mentawa Baru Ketapang District (excluding 5 rural desa in the south) and all of Baamang District.

== Administrative districts ==
At the 2010 Census, East Kotawaringin Regency consisted of fifteen districts (kecamatan), but two more districts (Tualan Hulu and Telaga Antang) were subsequently established by the splitting of existing districts. The seventeen districts are tabulated below with their areas and population totals from the 2010 Census and the 2020 Census, together with the official estimates as at mid 2025. The table also includes the locations of the district administrative centres, the number of administrative villages in each district (totaling 168 rural desa and 17 urban kelurahan), and its postal codes.

Kode Wilayah	Name of District (kecamatan)	Area in km^{2}	Pop'n Census 2010	Pop'n Census 2020	Pop'n Estimate mid 2025	Admin centre	No. of villages	Post codes
62.02.08	Mentaya Hilir Selatan (South Lower Mentaya)	209.24	20,801	23,010	23,240	Samuda	10 ^{(a)}	74363
62.02.11	Teluk Sampit (Sampit Bay)	663.27	8,935	10,562	11,020	Ujung Pandaran	6	74364
62.02.09	Pulau Hanaut (Hanaut Island)	625.50	15,473	16,809	16,830	Bapinang	14	74362
62.02.06	Mentawa Baru Ketapang	349.45	76,951	98,680	107,050	Sampit	11 ^{(b)}	74321 - 74326
62.02.12	Seranau	708.60	9,587	10,874	11,120	Mentaya Seberang	6 ^{(c)}	74314 - 74315 ^{(d)}
62.02.05	Baamang	206.84	51,538	69,714	77,600	Baamang	6 ^{(e)}	74311 - 74316
62.02.07	Mentaya Hilir Utara (North Lower Mentaya)	973.50	15,840	18,780	19,610	Bagendang	7	74361
Sub-totals	Southern group	3,736.40	199,125	248,429	266,470		60	
62.02.01	Kota Besi	638.60	14,980	18,444	19,620	Kota Besi	11 ^{(f)}	74353
62.02.14	Telawang	1,171.53	16,823	20,518	21,720	Sebabi	6	74350
62.02.02	Cempaga	864.02	19,076	22,297	23,130	Cempaga Mulia	8	74354
62.02.13	Cempaga Hulu (Upper Cempaga)	1,501.97	23,262	21,586	22,040	Pundu	11	74359
62.02.04	Parenggean	718.15	35,608	26,628	26,920	Parenggean	15 ^{(c)}	74355
62.02.16	Tualan Hulu (Upper Tualan)	846.05	^{(g)}	7,766	7,930	Luwuk Sampun	11	74358
62.02.03	Mentaya Hulu (Upper Mentaya)	1,315.68	28,522	20,533	20,960	Kuala Kuayan	16 ^{(c)}	74357
62.02.15	Bukit Santuai	1,684.34	8,038	10,380	11,300	Tumbang Penyahuan	14	74356
62.02.10	Antang Kalang	1,605.18	28,741	13,357	13,640	Tumbang Kalang	15	74352
62.02.17	Telaga Antang (Lake Antang)	1,461.90	^{(h)}	18,957	19,160	Tumbang Mangkup	18	74352 ^{(i)}
Sub-totals	Northern group	11,807.42	175,050	180,466	186,420		125	
	Totals	15,543,82	374,175	428,895	452,870	Sampit	185	

Notes: (a) comprises 2 kelurahan (Samuda Kota and Basirih Hilir) and 8 desa. (b) comprises 5 kelurahan (Ketapang, Mentawa Baru Hilir, Mentawa Baru Hulu, Pasir Putih and Sawahan) and 6 desa.
(c) including one kelurahan (the district admin centre). (d) except for the village of Mentaya Seberang, which has a post code of 74324.
(e) comprises 5 kelurahan (Baamang Barat, Baamang Hilir, Baamang Hulu, Baamang Tengah and Tanah Mas) and 1 desa (Tinduk), which are all part of Greater Sampit.
(f) comprises 2 kelurahan (Kota Besi Hilir and Kota Besi Hulu) and 9 desa.
(g) the 2010 population of Tualan Hulu District is included in the figures for the districts from which it was cut out.
(h) the 2010 population of Telaga Antang District is included in the figure for Antang Kalang District.
(i) except for the village of Buana Mustika, which has a post code of 74356.
