= West Kotawaringin Regency =

Regency in Central Kalimantan, Indonesia

West Kotawaringin Regency Kabupaten Kotawaringin Barat
- Regency
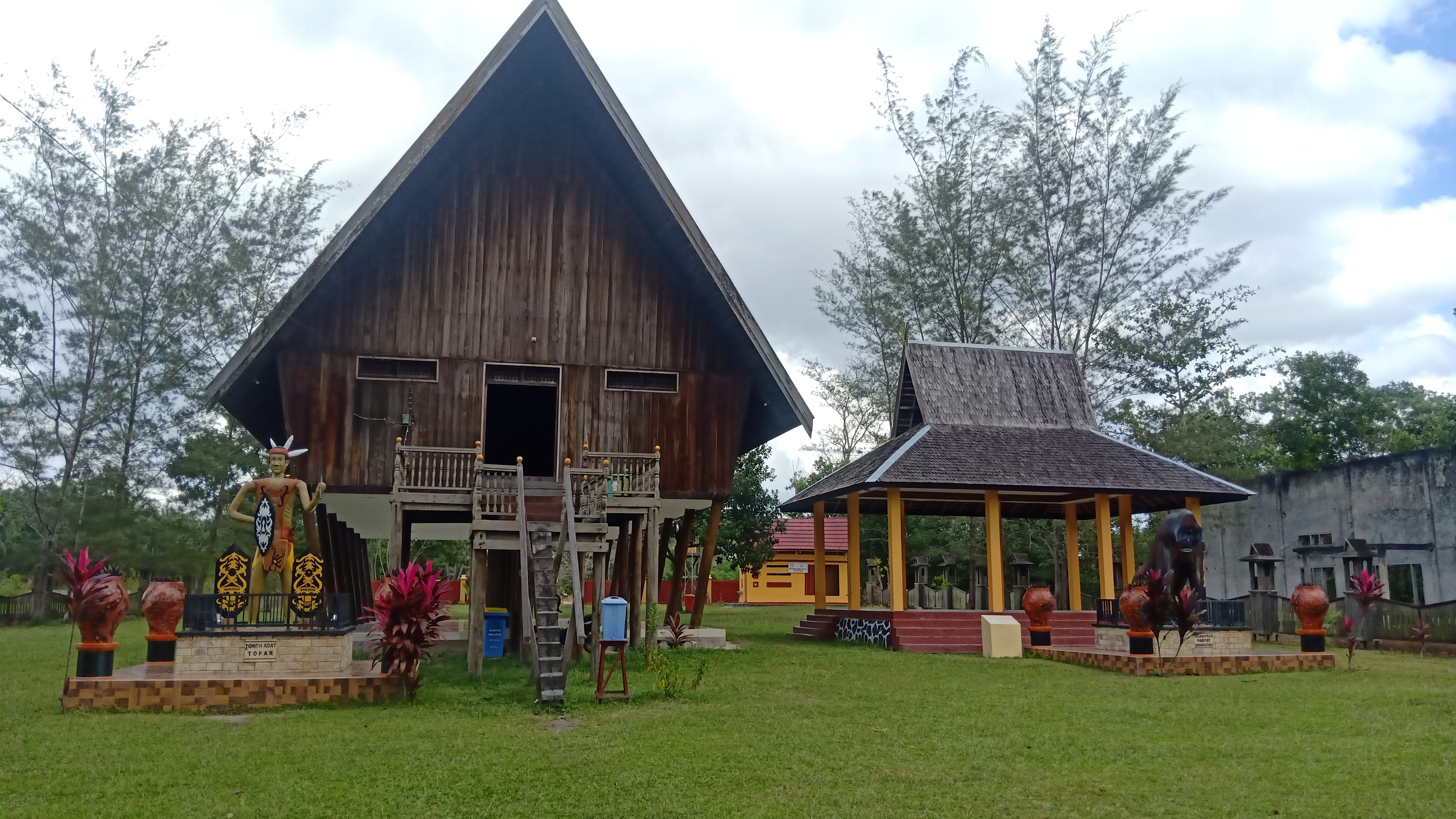
- Betang traditional house

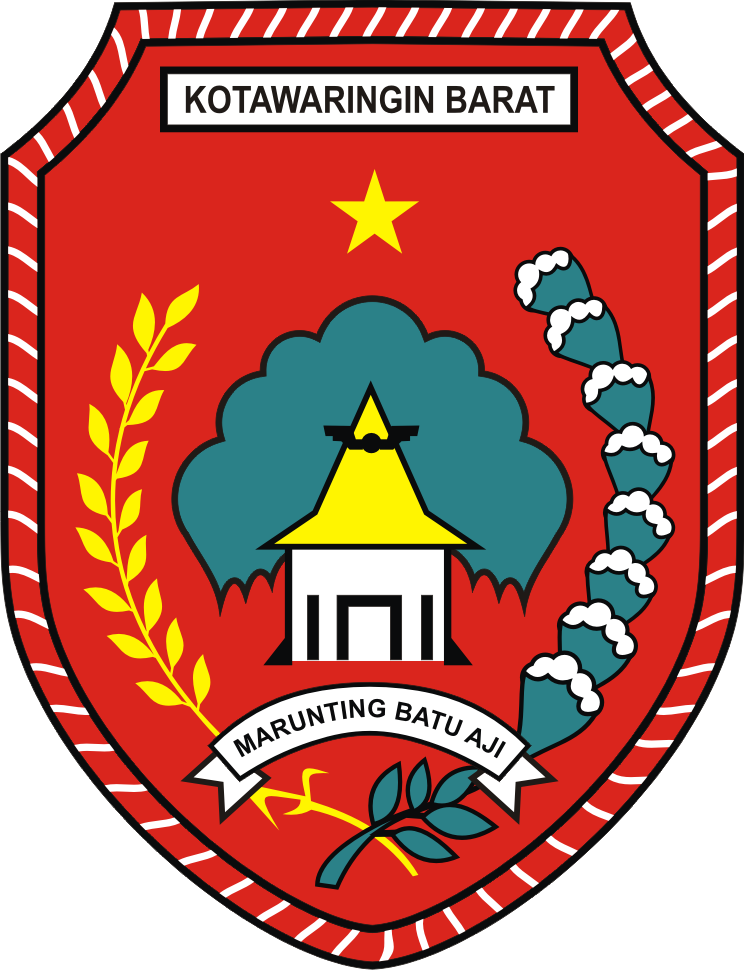
- Coat of arms

- Location within Central Kalimantan

- Location in Kalimantan and Indonesia West Kotawaringin Regency (Indonesia)
- Coordinates: 2.4000°S 111.7333°E
- Country: Indonesia
- Region: Kalimantan
- Province: Central Kalimantan
- Capital: Pangkalan Bun

Government
  - Regent: Nurhidayah
  - Vice Regent: Suyanto

Area
  - Total: 10,759.00 km^{2} (4,154.07 sq mi)

Population (mid 2025 estimate)
  - Total: 285,737
  - Density: 26.5580/km^{2} (68.7848/sq mi)
- Time zone: UTC+7 (Western Indonesia Time)
- Area code: (+62) 532
- Website: kotawaringinbaratkab.go.id

West Kotawaringin Regency (Indonesian: Kabupaten Kotawaringin Barat) is one of the thirteen regencies which comprise the Central Kalimantan Province on the island of Kalimantan (Borneo), Indonesia. It originally comprised the whole western part of the province, having been split from a single Kotawaringin Regency on 26 June 1959 into separate regencies for West and East Kotawaringin, but on 10 April 2002 the most westerly districts of West Kotawaringin were split off to form the new Lamandau Regency and Sukamara Regency. The residual West Kotawaringin Regency has a land area of about 10,759 km^{2}, and its population was 235,803 at the 2010 Census and 270,388 at the 2020 Census; the official estimate as at mid 2025 was 285,737 (comprising 147,130 males and 138,310 females). The large town of Pangkalan Bun in Arut Selatan District is the capital of West Kotawaringin Regency.

== Administrative districts ==
West Kotawaringin Regency now consists of six administrative districts (kecamatan), tabulated below with their areas and population totals from the 2010 Census and the 2020 Census, together with the official estimates as at mid 2025. Pangkalan Banteng and Pangkalan Lada Districts were previously the northern part of Kumai District. The table also includes the locations of the district administrative centres, the number of administrative villages in each district (a total of 81 rural desa and 13 urban kelurahan), and its post codes.

Kode Wilayah	Name of District (kecamatan)	Area in km^{2}	Pop'n Census 2010	Pop'n Census 2020	Pop'n Estimate mid 2025	Admin centre	No. of villages	Post codes
62.01.03	Kotawaringin Lama	1,218.0	16,796	19,138	20,081	Kotawaringin Hilir	17 ^{(a)}	74161
62.01.02	Arut Selatan (South Arut)	2,400.0	98,406	117,742	126,499	Madurejo (in Pangkalan Bun)	20 ^{(b)}	74111: 74117
62.01.01	Kumai	2,921.0	46,544	52,633	55,024	Candi	18 ^{(c)}	74181
62.01.06	Pangkalan Banteng	1,306.0	30,597	37,370	37,835	Karang Mulya	17	74183
62.01.05	Pangkalan Lada	229.03	27,934	34,164	37,097	Pandu Sanjaya	11	74184
62.01.04	Arut Utara (North Arut)	2,685.0	15,526	9,341	9,201	Pangkut	11 ^{(d)}	74152
	Totals	10,759.0	235,803	270,388	285,737	Pangkalan Bun	94	

Notes: (a) including 2 kelurahan (Kotawaringin Hilir and Kotawaringin Hulu).
(b) comprising 7 kelurahan - Mendawai Seberang (with 2,337 inhabitants in mid 2024), Mendawai (12,853), Madurejo (24,681), Sidorejo (19,086), Raja (6,727), Raja Seberang (2,602) and Baru (25,828), together with 13 desa.
(c) including 3 kelurahan (Candi, Kumai Hilir and Kumai Hulu). (d) including 1 kelurahan (Pangkut).
