= South Bolaang Mongondow Regency =

Regency in North Sulawesi, Indonesia

Coordinates: 0°21′10″N 123°47′57″E

South Bolaang Mongondow Regency Kabupaten Bolaang Mongondow Selatan
- Regency
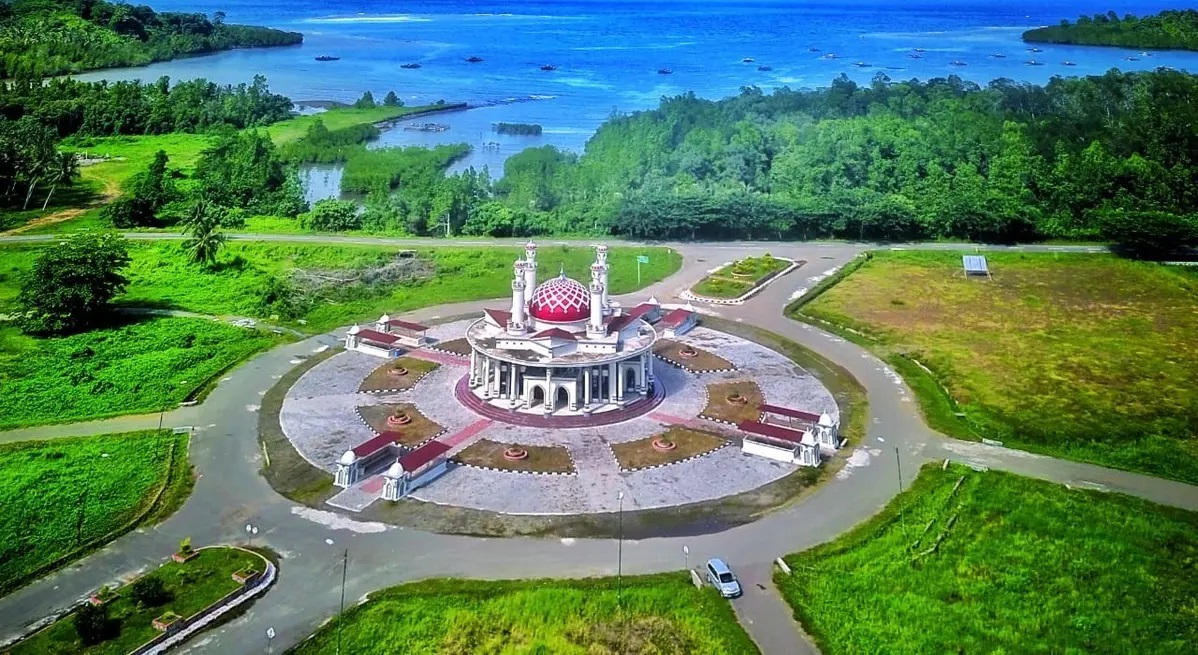
- Great Mosque of South Bolaang Mongondow

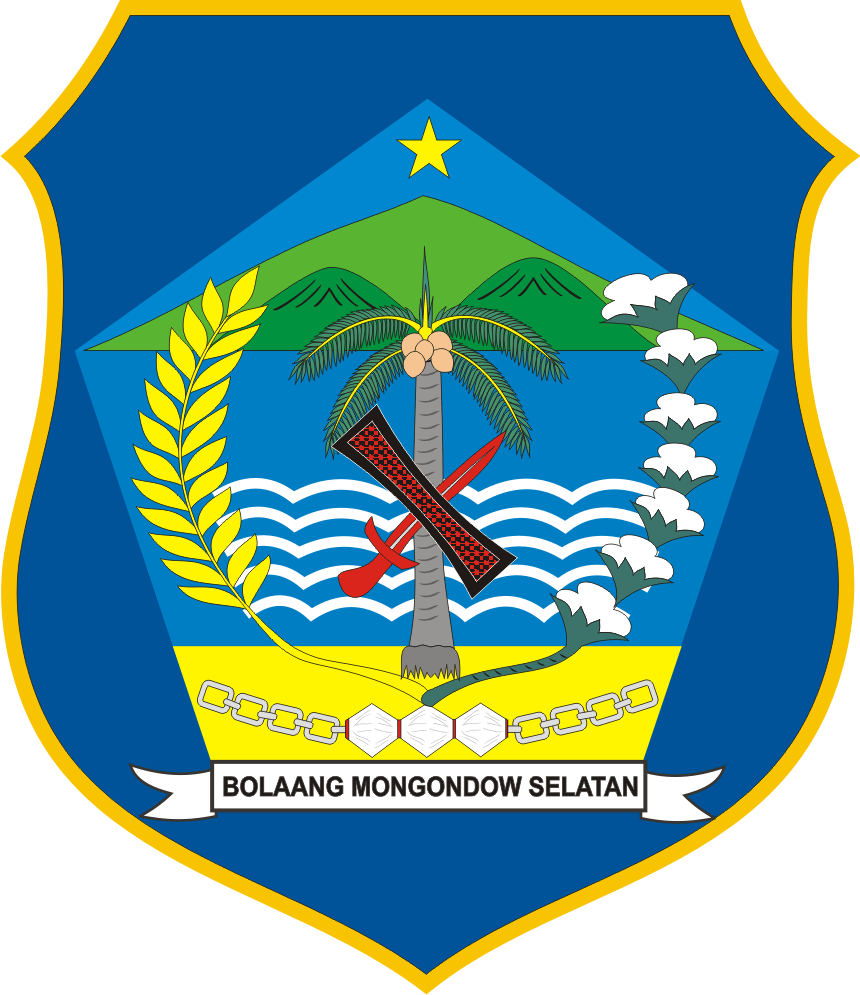
- Coat of arms

- Country: Indonesia
- Province: North Sulawesi
- Capital: Molibagu

Government
  - Regent: Iskandar Kamaru
  - Vice Regent: Deddy Abdul Hamid

Area
  - Total: 1,772.89 km^{2} (684.52 sq mi)

Population (mid 2025 estimate)
  - Total: 76,105
  - Density: 42.927/km^{2} (111.18/sq mi)
- Time zone: UTC+7 (WIB)
- Website: bolselkab.go.id

South Bolaang Mongondow Regency is a regency of North Sulawesi Province of Indonesia. The Regency stretches along the south coast of the province as part of the Minahasa Peninsula, facing the Gulf of Tomini. It was created on 24 June 2008 by splitting off districts which were previously the southern part of Bolaang Mongondow Regency. It covers a land area of 1,772.89 km^{2}, and had a population of 57,001 at the 2010 Census, which rose to 69,791 at the 2020 Census; the official estimate as at mid 2025 was 76,105 (comprising 39,368 males and 36,737 females). The administrative centre lies at the town of Molibagu.

== Administration ==
At the time of the 2010 Census, the Regency was divided into five districts (kecamatan), but two additional districts (Helumo and Tomini) have subsequently been created by splitting of existing districts. The seven districts are tabulated below with their areas and their populations at the 2010 Census and the 2020 Census, together with the official estimates as at mid 2025. The table also includes the locations of the district administrative centres, the numbers of administrative villages (all classed as rural desa) in each district and its postal code.

| Kode Wilayah | Name of District (kecamatan)( | Area in km^{2} | Pop'n Census 2010 | Pop'n Census 2020 | Pop'n Estimate mid 2025 | Admin centre | No. of villages | Post code |
|---|---|---|---|---|---|---|---|---|
| 71.11.02 | Posigadan | 565.97 | 16,445 | 14,543 | 16,080 | Momalia | 16 | 95774 |
| 71.11.07 | Tomini | 138.86 | ^{(a)} | 6,043 | 6,527 | Milangodaa | 7 | 95778 |
| 71.11.01 | Bolang Uki | 185.71 | 19,630 | 17,690 | 18,919 | Molibagu | 17 | 95770 |
| 71.11.06 | Helumo | 183.93 | ^{(b)} | 6,933 | 7,542 | Duminanga | 11 | 95779 |
| 71.11.03 | Pinolosian ^{(c)} | 280.39 | 9,064 | 10,694 | 11,718 | Pinolosian | 10 | 95775 |
| 71.11.04 | Pinolosian Tengah (Central Pinolosian) | 182.65 | 5,124 | 6,272 | 6,898 | Adow | 8 | 95776 |
| 71.11.05 | Pinolosian Timur (East Pinolosian) | 235.38 | 6,738 | 7,616 | 8,421 | Dumagin B | 12 | 95777 |
| | Totals | 1,772.89 | 57,001 | 69,791 | 76,105 | Molibagu | 81 | |

Notes: (a) the 2010 population of Tomini District is included in the figure for Posigadan District, from which it was cut out.
(b) the 2010 population of Helumo District is included in the figure for Bolaang Uki District, from which it was cut out.
(c) including four offshore islands - Pulau Babi, Pulau Kelapa, Pulau Pondan Mointok and Pulau Pondan Moloben.
