= Ogan Komering Ulu Regency =

Regency in South Sumatra, Indonesia

Coordinates: 4.1333°S 104.0333°E

Ogan Komering Ulu Regency Kabupaten Ogan Komering Ulu
- Regency
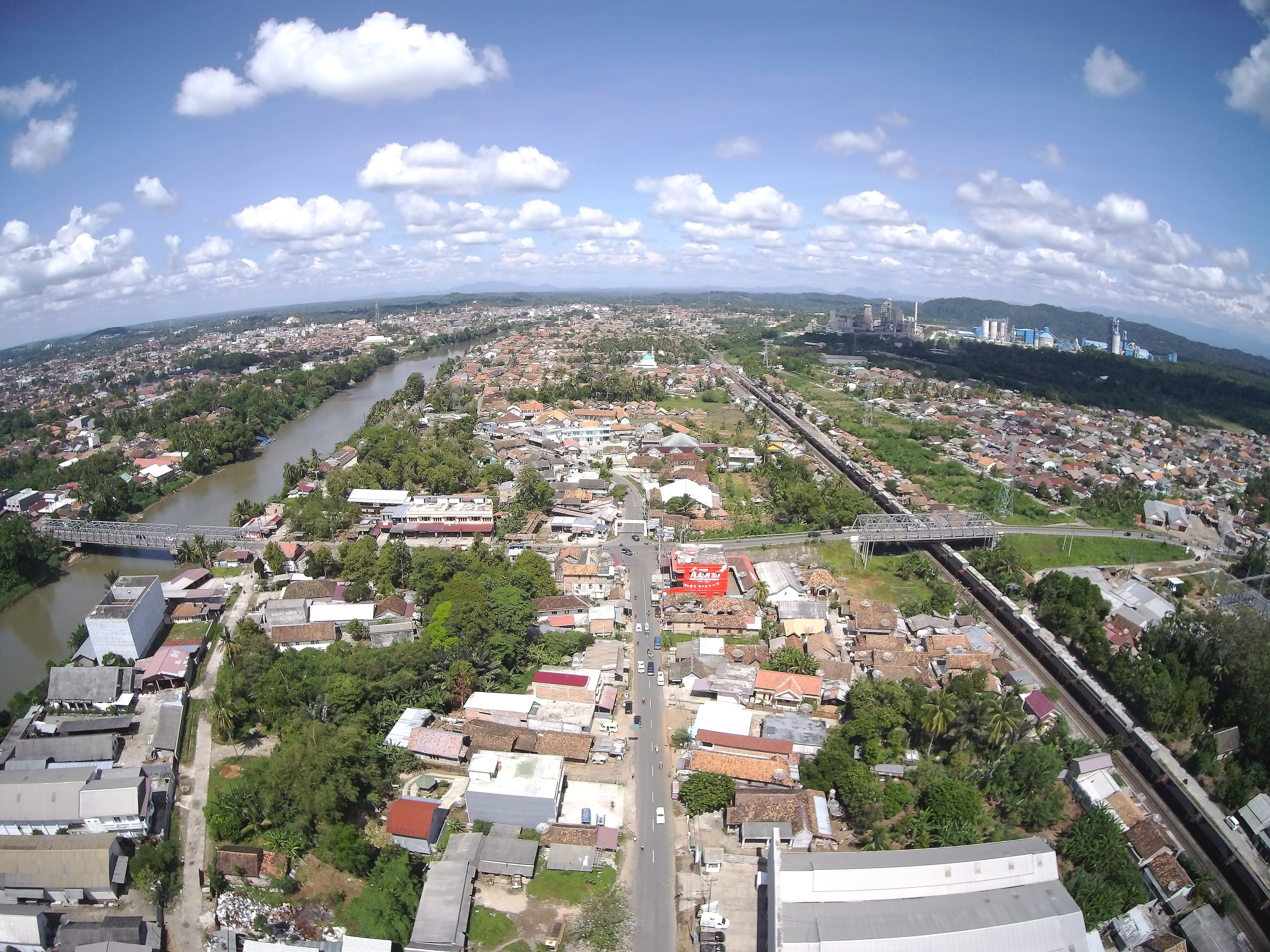
- Baturaja from above

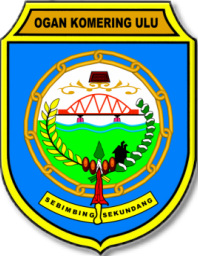
- Coat of arms
- Motto: Sebimbing Sekundang
- Location in South Sumatra
- Country: Indonesia
- Province: South Sumatra
- Regency seat: Baturaja

Government
  - Regent: Teddy Meilwansyah
  - Vice Regent: Marjito Bachri

Area
  - Total: 4,797.06 km^{2} (1,852.16 sq mi)

Population (mid 2025 estimate)
  - Total: 394,622
  - Density: 82.2633/km^{2} (213.061/sq mi)
- Time zone: UTC+7 (WIB)
- Website: okukab.go.id

Ogan Komering Ulu Regency is a regency of South Sumatra, Indonesia. It formerly covered an area of 10,408 km^{2} with a population of around 1,000,000 people; however on 18 December 2003 parts of this area were split off to form separate regencies of East Ogan Komering Ulu and South Ogan Komering Ulu; the residual regency area covers just 4,797.06 km^{2} and had a population of 324,045 at the 2010 Census and 367,603 at the 2020 Census; the official estimate as at mid 2025 was 394,622 (comprising 201,952 males and 192,670 females). The administrative centre is the town of Baturaja.

== Administrative districts ==
This Regency is administratively composed of thirteen districts (kecamatan), listed below with their areas (in km^{2}) and their populations at the 2010 and 2020 Censuses, together with the official estimates as at mid 2025. The table also includes the locations of the district administrative centres, the numbers of villages in each district (totaling 144 rural desa and 14 urban kelurahan - the latter all in Bataraja town), and its postal code.

Kode Wilayah	Name of District (kecamatan)	Area in km^{2}	Pop'n Census 2010	Pop'n Census 2020	Pop'n Estimate mid 2025	Admin centre	No. of villages	Post code
16.01.28	Lengkiti	512.93	25,369	25,032	26,802	Tanjung Lengkayap	22	32158
16.01.17	Sosoh Buay Rayap	385.30	11,871	13,762	14,844	Penyandingan	11	32151
16.01.08	Pengandonan	543.61	9,071	10,220	10,673	Pengandonan	12	32154
16.01.21	Semidang Aji	707.56	24,719	28,195	30,796	Ulak Pandan	21	32156
16.01.20	Ulu Ogan	597.37	8,705	8,965	8,981	Mendingin	7	32157
16.01.31	Muara Jaya	26.32	6,617	7,438	7,917	Muara Saeh	7	32155
16.01.09	Peninjauan	725.92	39,861	32,435	34,105	Peninjauan	16	32191
16.01.22	Lubuk Batang	724.81	27,107	32,975	35,883	Lubuk Batang Baru	15	32192
16.01.29	Sinar Peninjauan	84.94	20,602	22,978	23,513	Marga Bakti	6	32159
16.01.32	Kedaton Peninjauan Raya	183.31	^{(a)}	12,723	13,761	Kedaton	8	32193
16.01.14	Bataraja Timur (East Baturaja)	110.22	90,557	104,488	115,720	Kemala Raja	14 ^{(b)}	32111: 32117
16.01.30	Lubuk Raja	69.42	27,498	30,781	32,101	Batumarta II	7	32152
16.01.13	Bataraja Barat (West Baturaja)	125.05	32,068	37,611	39,526	Tanjung Agung	12 ^{(c)}	32121: 32126
	Totals	4,797.06	324,045	367,603	390,048	Bataraja Timur	158	

Note: (a) The 2010 population of the new Kedaton Peninjauan Raya District, created since 2010, is included in the figure for Peninjauan District, from which it was removed.
(b) comprises 9 kelurahan (Baturaja Lama, Baturaja Permai, Kemala Raja, Kemelak Bindung Langit, Pasar Baru, Sekar Jaya, Sepancar Lawang Kulon, Sukajadi and Sukaraya) and 5 desa. In 2024, Kemala Raja had 15,258 inhabitants, Sekar Jaya had 14,461, Tanjung Baru (desa) had 13,372, Air Puah (desa) 12,106, Sukajadi 9,597 and Sukaraya 8,713.
(c) comprises 5 kelurahan (Air Gading, Batu Kuning, Saung Naga, Talang Jawa and Tanjung Agung) and 7 desa.

== Harimau Cave and Putri Cave ==
Both caves lay in the same Padangbindu village 35 kilometers from Baturaja. Harimau (Tiger) Cave entrance is 40 to 50 meters wide and 20 to 35 meters height. Since 2008 to mid-2013 archaeologists have found 72 skeletons of mongoloid race with prediction 3,000 years of age and the excavation is still running. Some of the skeletons are displayed in Si Pahit Lidah (Bitter Tongue) Museum near Putri (Princess) Cave. Putri Cave has 20x160 meter square pond.

Harimau Cave is located 30 meters above Air Kaman Basa River and 1.5 kilometers from Ogan River. Archeologists estimate that the cave has been used for 15 millennia, with traces of three different cultures, the latest being 3,500 years ago (Bronze Age) with metal tools similar to those found in Dong son sites (Vietnam). There are also 34 geometric pictures in Harimau Cave which the picture is never found at any other caves in Sumatra. On March 14, 2015, after midnight, a big flood which never occurred before appeared ruins tourist facilities inside the cave and also the facilities in the ground in front of the cave; tourism facilities are predicted 70 percent damaged, but the condition of the pictures are not yet announced.
