= Sukamara Regency =

Regency in Central Kalimantan, Indonesia

Sukamara Regency Kabupaten Sukamara
- Regency
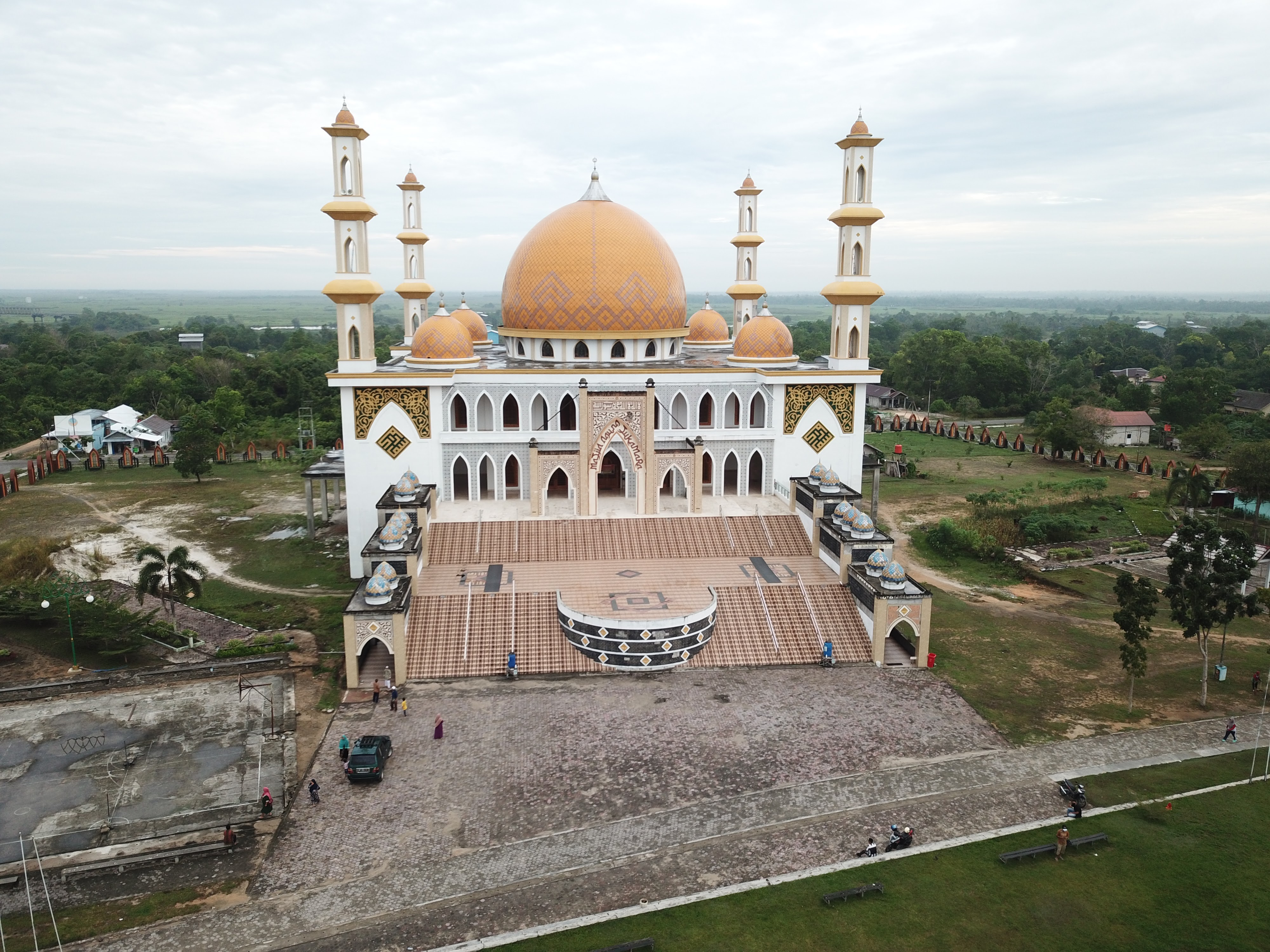
- Great mosque of Sukamara

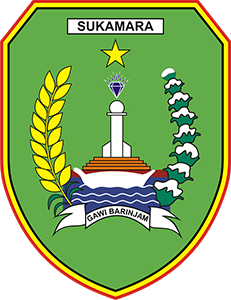
- Coat of arms

- Location within Central Kalimantan

- Location in Kalimantan and Indonesia Sukamara Regency (Indonesia)
- Coordinates: 2.6267°S 111.2368°E
- Country: Indonesia
- Region: Kalimantan
- Province: Central Kalimantan
- Capital: Padang

Government
  - Regent: Masduki
  - Vice Regent: Nur Efendi

Area
  - Total: 3,827 km^{2} (1,478 sq mi)

Population (mid 2025 estimate)
  - Total: 68,980
  - Density: 18.02/km^{2} (46.68/sq mi)
- Time zone: UTC+7 (Western Indonesia Time)
- Area code: (+62) 532
- Website: sukamarakab.go.id

Sukamara Regency (Indonesian: Kabupaten Sukamara) is one of the thirteen regencies which comprise the Central Kalimantan Province on the island of Kalimantan (Borneo), Indonesia. It was created on 10 April 2002 from the former southwest part of West Kotawaringin Regency. The town of Padang (in Sukamara District) contains the administrative centre of Sukamara Regency, and had a population of 6,555 in mid 2023. The Regency covers an area of 3,827 km^{2}, and had a population of 44,952 at the 2010 Census and 63,464 at the 2020 Census; the official estimate as at mid 2025 was 68,980 (comprising 35,970 males and 33,010 females).

== Administrative districts ==
Sukamara Regency consists of five districts (kecamatan), tabulated below from south to north with their areas and populations from the 2010 Census and the 2020 Census, together with the official estimates as at mid 2025. The table also includes the locations of the district administrative centres, the number of administrative villages in each district (a total of 29 rural desa and 3 urban kelurahan), and its postal codes.

Jelai District and Pantai Lunci District are the southern (coastal) parts of the regency, with the majority of the population further north. The urban area of Padang/Sukamara/Mendawai is situated on the Jelai River, at its junction with its tributary, the Mapam River.

Kode Wilayah	Name of District (kecamatan)	Area in km^{2}	Pop'n Census 2010	Pop'n Census 2020	Pop'n Estimate mid 2025	Admin centre	No. of villages	Post codes
62.08.02	Jelai ^{(a)}	796	4,412	5,528	5,640	Kuala Jelai	5 ^{(b)}	74171
62.08.04	Pantai Lunci	804	4,846	5,861	6,090	Sungai Cabang Barat	4	74170
62.08.01	Sukamara	1,028	19,623	30,890	34,490	Padang	8 ^{(c)}	74172
62.08.03	Balai Riam	539	6,649	10,623	11,980	Balai Riam	8	74173
62.08.05	Permata Kecubung	660	9,422	10,562	10,780	Ajang	7	74174
	Totals	3,827	44,952	63,464	68,980	Padang	32	

Note: (a) Jelai District includes four small offshore islands - Pulau Jamban, Pulau Nibung Hilir, Pulau Nibung Hulu and Pulau Tangguk.
(b) includes one kelurahan - the town of Kuala Jelai (with 3,648 inhabitants in mid 2023).
(c) includes 2 kelurahan - Mendawai (with 10,732 inhabitants as at mid 2023) and Padang (6,555 inhabitants).

.

== Demographics ==
Religion as of the Indonesian census of 2010:

- Muslim 78.9%
- Protestant 8.4%
- Roman Catholic 4.6%
- Buddhist 0.3%
- Hindu 0.2%
- Confucian 0.1%
- Other 7.3%
- Not stated or not asked 0.3%

== Climate ==
Sukamara has a tropical rainforest climate (Af) with heavy rainfall year-round.

Climate data for Sukamara
Month	Jan	Feb	Mar	Apr	May	Jun	Jul	Aug	Sep	Oct	Nov	Dec	Year
Mean daily maximum °C (°F)	29.7 (85.5)	29.9 (85.8)	30.4 (86.7)	31.0 (87.8)	31.3 (88.3)	31.1 (88.0)	31.5 (88.7)	31.8 (89.2)	31.9 (89.4)	31.6 (88.9)	30.9 (87.6)	30.1 (86.2)	30.9 (87.7)
Daily mean °C (°F)	26.2 (79.2)	26.3 (79.3)	26.6 (79.9)	26.9 (80.4)	27.2 (81.0)	26.9 (80.4)	27.0 (80.6)	27.1 (80.8)	27.2 (81.0)	27.0 (80.6)	26.8 (80.2)	26.3 (79.3)	26.8 (80.2)
Mean daily minimum °C (°F)	22.7 (72.9)	22.8 (73.0)	22.8 (73.0)	22.9 (73.2)	23.1 (73.6)	22.7 (72.9)	22.5 (72.5)	22.4 (72.3)	22.6 (72.7)	22.5 (72.5)	22.7 (72.9)	22.6 (72.7)	22.7 (72.9)
Average rainfall mm (inches)	234 (9.2)	240 (9.4)	294 (11.6)	319 (12.6)	268 (10.6)	234 (9.2)	209 (8.2)	152 (6.0)	230 (9.1)	260 (10.2)	303 (11.9)	310 (12.2)	3,053 (120.2)
Source: Climate-Data.org
