= Baturaja =

Coordinates: 4.1228°S 104.1680°E

- Town
- Location in South Sumatra
- Country: Indonesia
- Province: South Sumatra
- Regency: Ogan Komering Ulu Regency

Area
  - Total: 235.27 km^{2} (90.84 sq mi)

Population (mid 2024 estimate)
  - Total: 152,828
  - Density: 649.59/km^{2} (1,682.4/sq mi)
- Time zone: UTC+7 (WIB)
- Website: http://www.okukab.go.id

Baturaja is a town and the administrative capital of Ogan Komering Ulu Regency in South Sumatra, Indonesia. It has an area of 235.27 square kilometres and had a population of 142,099 people at the 2020 Census; the official estimate as at mid 2023 was 152,828.

== Districts ==
Baturaja is divided into two districts of the Regency:

- Baturaja Barat (West Baturaja)
- Baturaja Timur (East Baturaja)
