= Bolaang Mongondow Regency =

Regency in North Sulawesi, Indonesia

Bolaang Mongondow Regency Kabupaten Bolaang Mongondow
- Regency
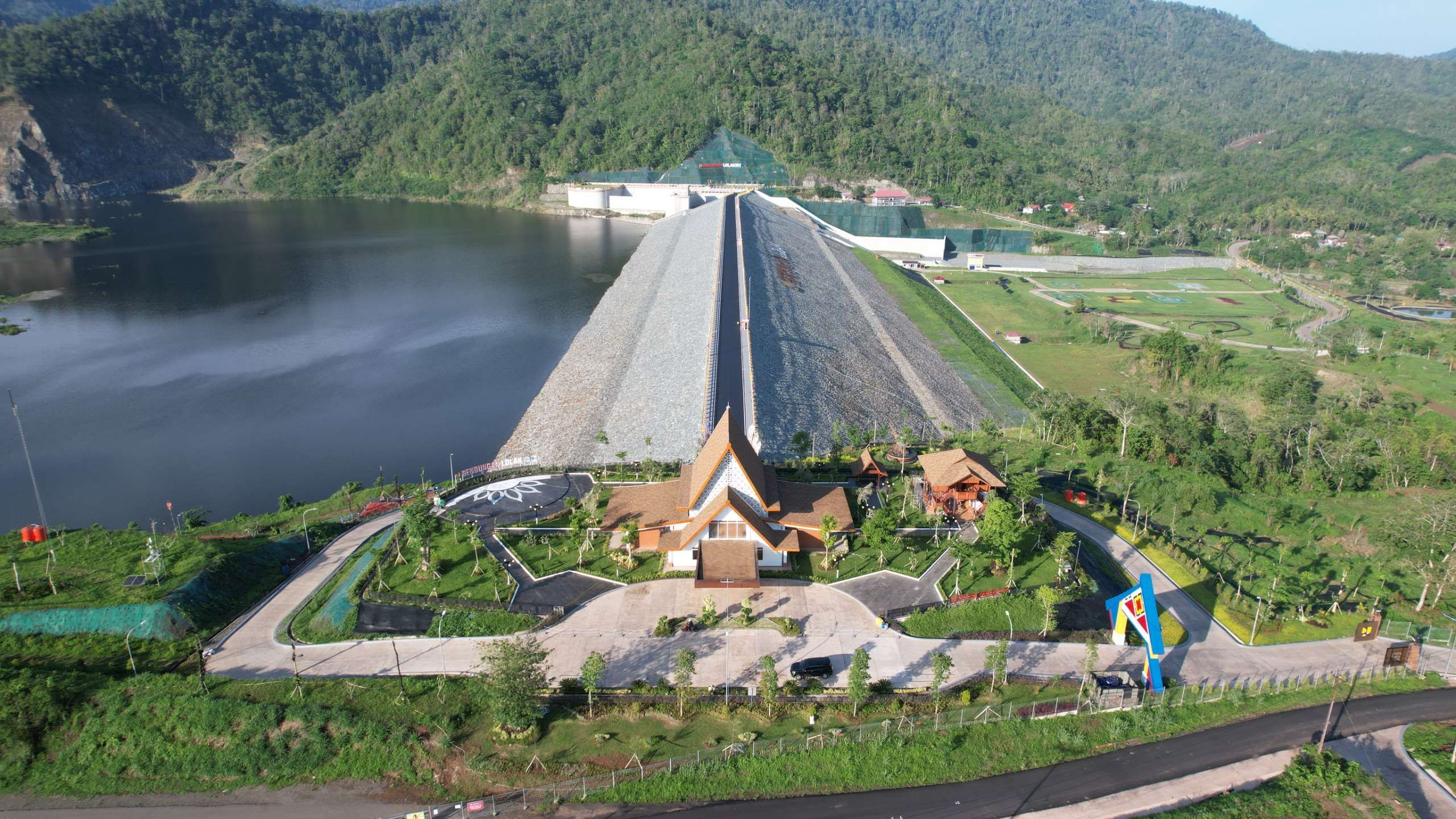
- Lolak dam

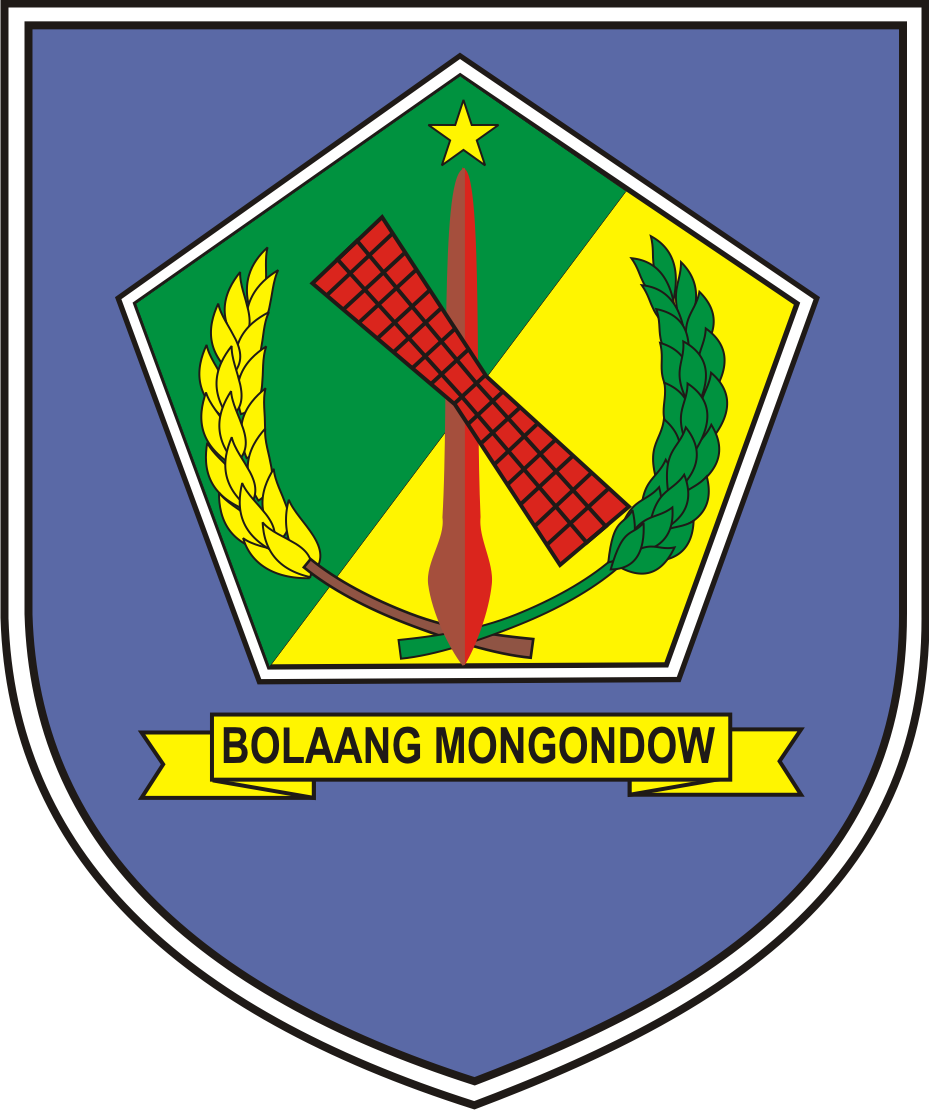
- Coat of arms

- Location within North Sulawesi

- Location in Sulawesi and Indonesia Bolaang Mongondow Regency (Indonesia)
- Coordinates: 0°57′30″N 124°15′36″E
- Country: Indonesia
- Province: North Sulawesi
- Capital: Lolak

Government
  - Regent: Yusra Alhabsyi
  - Vice Regent: Dony Lumenta

Area
  - Total: 2,871.65 km^{2} (1,108.75 sq mi)

Population (mid 2025 estimate)
  - Total: 258,561
  - Density: 90.0392/km^{2} (233.200/sq mi)
- Time zone: UTC+8 (ICST)
- Area code: (+62) 434
- Website: bolmongkab.go.id

Bolaang Mongondow Regency is a regency of North Sulawesi Province, Indonesia, situated on the island of Sulawesi. The principal town lies at Kotamobagu, which since 2007 has been administratively separated from the regency, the administrative centre of which is now at the town of Lolak. The regency covers a land area of 2,871.65 km^{2}, and had a population of 213,484 at the 2010 Census and 248,751 at the 2020 Census; the official estimate as at mid 2025 was 258,561 (comprising 134,496 males and 124,065 females).

== Geography ==
Bolaang Mongondow Regency is located between 00°15’46” and 01°15’38” North latitude and between 123°07’26” and 124°41’46” East longitude. It has boundaries as follows:

- North - Celebes Sea;
- South - Bolaang Mongondow Selatan Regency and Bolaang Mongondow Timur Regency;
- West - Bolaang Mongondow Utara Regency; and
- East - Minahasa Selatan Regency and Minahasa Tenggara Regency

== Administrative districts ==
Until 2007 the Regency included a much larger share of the territory off North Sulawesi Province, but on 2 January 2007 the town of Kotamobagu was split away to become an independent city, while northern districts of the regency were similarly split off on the same day to create a new North Bolaang Mongondow Regency. On 24 June 2008 two further regencies were created from other parts of the regency - South Bolaang Mongondow and East Bolaang Mongondow. At the time of the 2010 Census the residual Regency was divided into twelve districts (kecamatan), but three additional districts have subsequently been created by splitting of existing districts.

Under consideration by the Indonesian government since 2013 has been a proposal to re-unite the pre-2007 territories into a new province covering the same area as the original Bolaang Mongondow Regency, and separated from North Sulawesi, but all such proposals have been held in abeyance since 2013.

The fifteen districts are tabulated below with their areas and their populations at the 2010 Census and the 2020 Census, together with the official estimates as at mid 2025. The table also includes the location of the district administrative centres, the number of villages in each district, totaling 200 rural desa and 2 urban kelurahan - the latter being Inobonto (in Bolaang District) and Imandi (in Dumoga Timur District) - together with its postal codes.

Kode Wilayah	Name of District (kecamatan)	Area in km^{2}	Pop'n Census 2010	Pop'n Census 2020	Pop'n Estimate mid 2025	Admin centre	No. of villages	Post codes
71.01.05	Sangtompolang ^{(a)}	277.6	9,556	11,656	11,524	Maelang	12	95744
71.01.09	Dumoga Barat (West Dumoga)	380.5	26,520	18,514	18,579	Doloduo	12	95731
71.01.11	Dumoga Utara (North Dumoga)	190.4	21,410	15,085	15,295	Mopuya Utara (North Mopuya)	16	95734
71.01.10	Dumoga Timur (East Dumoga)	173.0	32,131	21,622	21,787	Modomang	16	95736
71.01.35	Dumoga Tengah (Central Dumoga)	48.4	^{(b)}	11,694	11,967	Ibolian	10	95732
71.01.34	Dumoga Tenggara (Southeast Dumoga)	146.3	^{(b)}	8,834	9,413	Konarom	10	95735
71.01.33	Dumoga	159.8	^{(b)}	15,219	15,815	Pusian	12	95733
Sub-totals	Western sector	1,376.0	89,617	102,624	104,379		88	
71.01.14	Lolayan	260.4	23,074	26,243	27,777	Tungoi	14	95737
71.01.19	Passi Barat (West Passi)	117.9	14,951	17,029	17,556	Passi	13	95751
71.01.22	Passi Timur (East Passi)	93.3	11,261	12,687	13,353	Pangian	13	95750
71.01.32	Bilalang	64.3	6,057	6,551	7,066	Bilalang IV	8	95755
71.01.20	Poigar	251.0	17,033	18,754	19,789	Poigar	20	95753
71.01.13	Bolaang	204.7	17,143	20,692	21,488	Inobonto	11	95752
71.01.31	Bolaang Timur (East Bolaang)	96.8	9,608	11,829	12,758	Tadoy	9	95754
71.01.12	Lolak ^{(c)}	469.2	24,740	32,342	33,753	Lolak	26	95741
Sub-totals	Eastern sector	1,557.6	123,867	146,127	154,182		114	
Totals for	Regency	2,871.65	213,484	248,751	258,561		202	

Notes: (a) Sangtompolang District, in the northwest of the regency, includes the offshore islands of Pulau Gogobola, Pulau Paniki, Pulau Tengah and Pulau Tudunya, all situated off the north coast.
(b) the populations at the 2010 Census of the communities now forming these three new districts are included in the figures for the existing districts from which they were cut out.
(c) Lolak District includes the offshore islands of Pulau Molosing and Pulau Tikus, situated off the north coast.

== Airport ==
A new airport was proposed in 2015 as a construction project located in Lolak town. The government allocated IDR250 billion (USD17.2 million) for the project. Construction was scheduled to commence in 2018 and complete by 2021. The airport originally will feature a 1400m runway, later to be extended to 2800m. The detailed airport planning envisages a runway both direction 10-28.

== Climate ==
Lolak has a tropical rainforest climate (Af) with moderate rainfall from July to September and heavy rainfall in the remaining months.

Climate data for Lolak
Month	Jan	Feb	Mar	Apr	May	Jun	Jul	Aug	Sep	Oct	Nov	Dec	Year
Mean daily maximum °C (°F)	30.1 (86.2)	30.1 (86.2)	30.4 (86.7)	31.1 (88.0)	31.3 (88.3)	30.9 (87.6)	30.8 (87.4)	31.4 (88.5)	31.8 (89.2)	32.0 (89.6)	31.4 (88.5)	30.6 (87.1)	31.0 (87.8)
Daily mean °C (°F)	26.3 (79.3)	26.3 (79.3)	26.5 (79.7)	26.8 (80.2)	27.2 (81.0)	26.8 (80.2)	26.6 (79.9)	26.8 (80.2)	26.9 (80.4)	27.0 (80.6)	27.0 (80.6)	26.6 (79.9)	26.7 (80.1)
Mean daily minimum °C (°F)	22.5 (72.5)	22.5 (72.5)	22.6 (72.7)	22.6 (72.7)	23.1 (73.6)	22.7 (72.9)	22.5 (72.5)	22.3 (72.1)	22.0 (71.6)	22.1 (71.8)	22.7 (72.9)	22.7 (72.9)	22.5 (72.6)
Average rainfall mm (inches)	224 (8.8)	187 (7.4)	184 (7.2)	175 (6.9)	184 (7.2)	164 (6.5)	123 (4.8)	91 (3.6)	93 (3.7)	131 (5.2)	197 (7.8)	203 (8.0)	1,956 (77.1)
Source: Climate-Data.org
