= Si Euli =

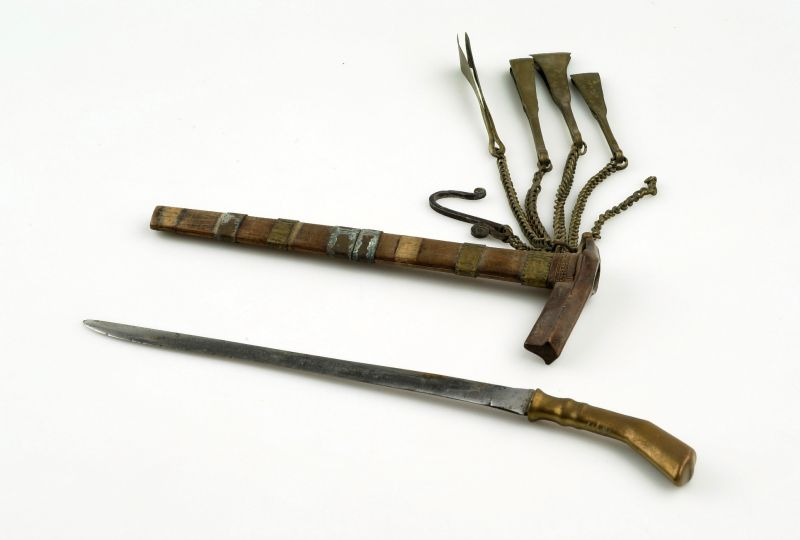
- A Si Euli knife, pre-1918.
- Type: Knife
- Place of origin: Indonesia (Nias)

Service history
- Used by: Nias people

Specifications
- Length: 39 cm (15 in)
- Blade type: Single edge
- Hilt type: Wood
- Scabbard/sheath: Wood

Si Euli is a traditional dagger or knife that originates from Nias (mostly North Nias), an island off the west coast of North Sumatra, Indonesia. There are versions of this knife worn by men or for daily use.

== Description ==
A dagger with a narrow, straight blade carried diagonally in the centre of the belt. The hilt is separated from the blade by a cylindrical brass ring and is curved at the end or makes a slight curve at about halfway. In the latter case the top of the hilt is flattened. The scabbard is straight and has a cross-piece at the mouth protruding towards the blade's edge or towards both sides. To the rear it may have a small protrusion, but also a prominent protrusion the point of which curves somewhat upwards. The scabbard may be wound with a brass wire and may have a small angled foot. Sometimes it has small chains with bells.

== See also ==
- Keris
- Gari
- Balato
