= Nias people =

Austronesian ethnic group

Nias people Niasans
Ono Niha
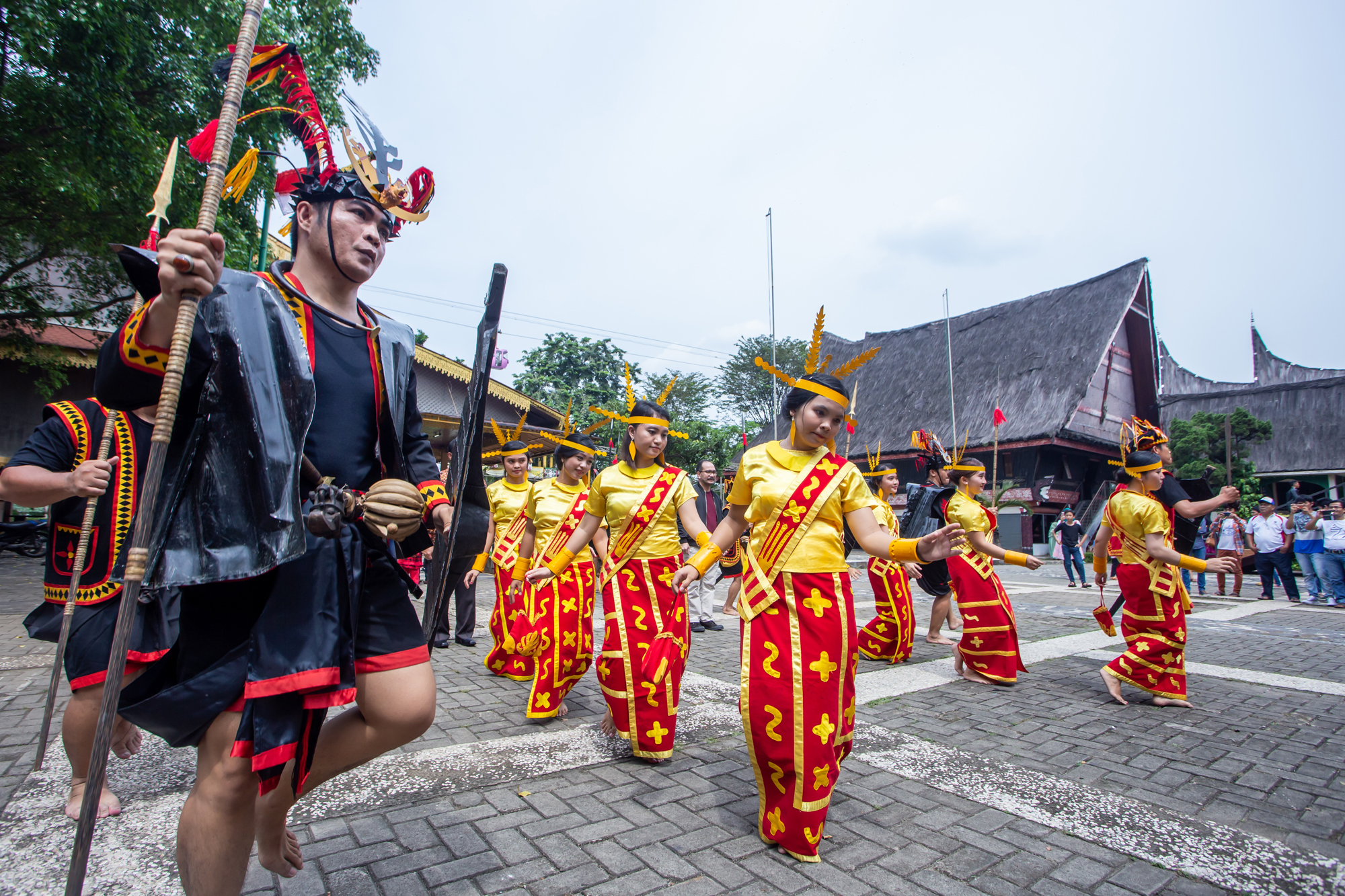
- A photograph of people from Nias Island dancing to Moyo, traditional dance from Nias, 2017

Total population
- 1,041,925 (2010 Indonesian census)

Regions with significant populations
- Indonesia (Nias Island, North Sumatra)

Languages
- Native; Nias; Also; Indonesian

Religion
- Christianity 95% (Protestantism 85%, Roman Catholicism 10%), Sunni Islam 5% Traditional Nias religion Fanömba adu

Related ethnic groups
- Austronesian peoples Batak · Mentawai · Sakuddei · Enggano · Sigulai

The Nias (Note: /ˈniːəs/ NEE-əss) (Nias: Ono Niha, lit. 'descendants of humans'; Indonesian: Orang Nias) or Niasans, are an Austronesian ethnic group native to Nias, an island off the west coast of North Sumatra, Indonesia. In the Nias language Nias Island is known as Tanö Niha, with Tanö meaning 'land' in the Nias language.

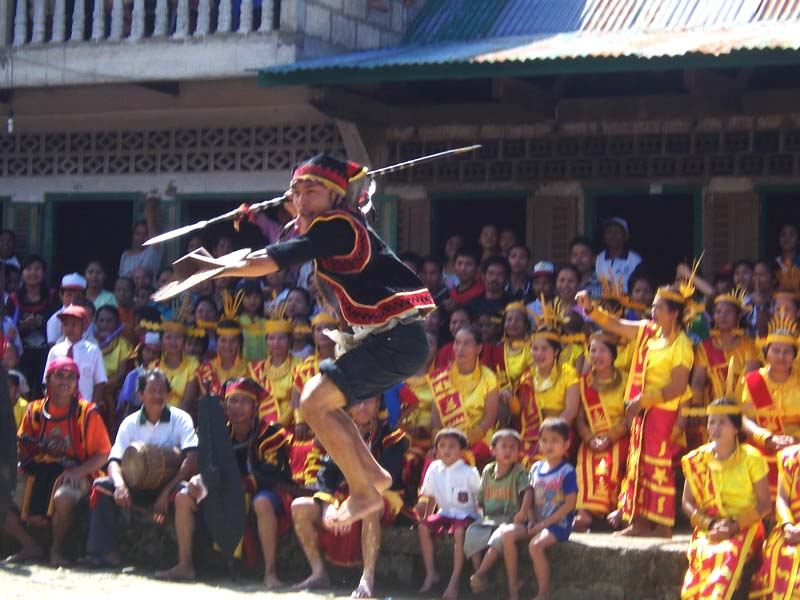
Nias war dance

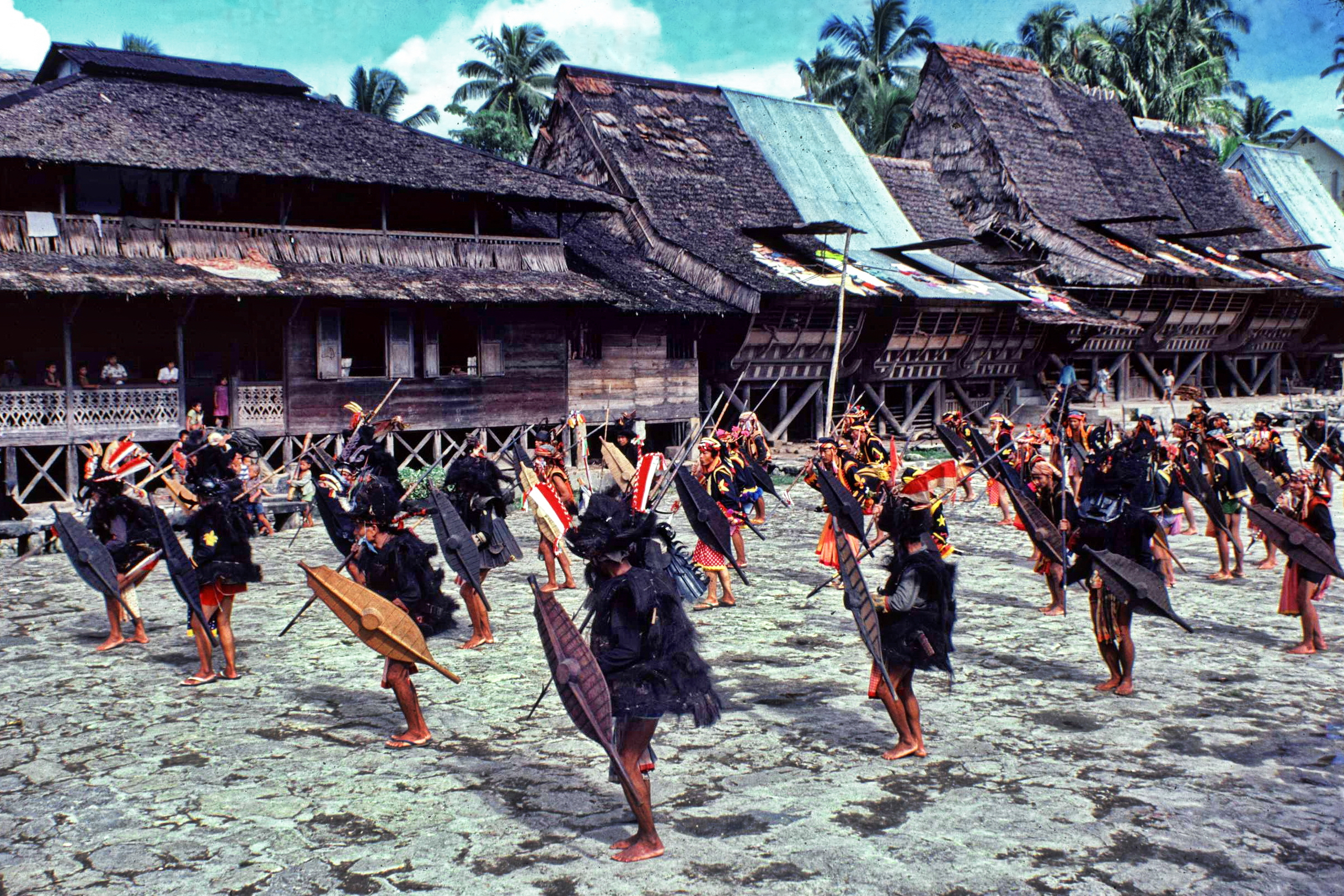
Niasans do a war dance on their front page.

The Nias people are a community that continues living within the norms and practices of their indigenous culture. The customary law of the Nias people is generally referred to as fondrakö, which regulates all aspects of life from birth to death. Historical evidence of megalithic structures and stone carvings that are found in the interior of the island proved that ancient Nias people practiced megalith culture. The caste system is also recognized in Nias society, whereby the highest level out of the 12 levels in the Nias caste system is Balugu. To reach this level of caste, one must be able to carry out big festivals by inviting thousands of people and slaughtering thousands of pigs for several days.

== Origins ==
=== Mythology ===
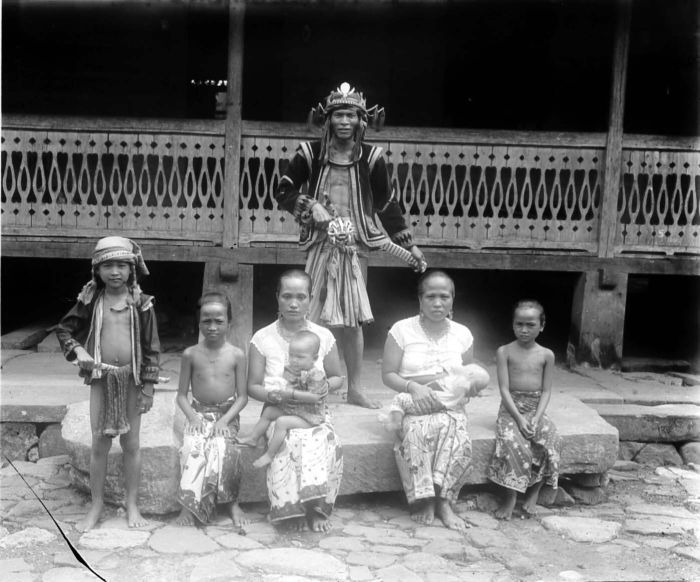
A Nias family.

According to the people of Nias, one of the mythical origins of the Nias tribe comes from a tree of life called Tora Sigaru'a which is located at a place called Tetehöli Ana'a. According to the myth, it is said that the arrival of the first human on Nias island began in the days of King Sirao, whose nine sons had been banished from Tetehöli Ana'a for fighting over the throne. Hence the nine sons of King Sirao were considered as the first people to set foot on the island of Nias.

=== Archaeological observations ===
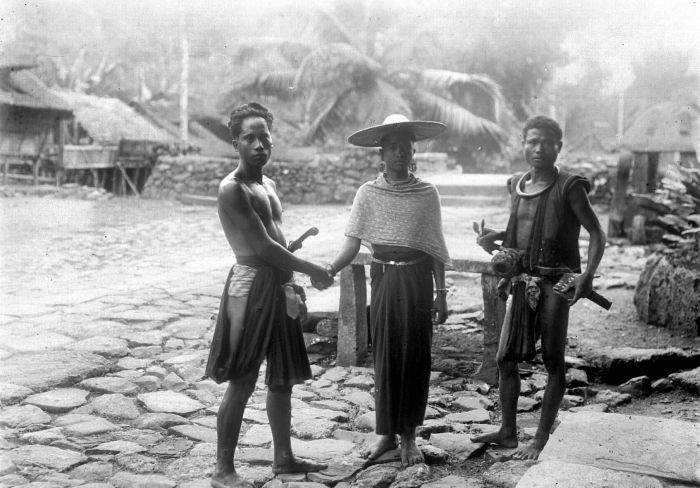
A wedding ceremony in South Nias.

Archaeological research has been conducted on Nias Island since 1999. The observations found that there has been human habitation on Nias island since 12,000 years ago through migration from Asia to Nias island during the Paleolithic period. There are indications of migration as far as 30,000 years ago. During that period the Hòa Bình, Vietnam civilization was similar to that in Nias island. Therefore, it was presumed that the origins of the Nias people came from an area in mainland Asia that is in modern-day Vietnam.

New genetic research has found that the Nias people of North Sumatra came from the Austronesian peoples. The ancestors of the Nias people are also thought to have come from Taiwan through the Philippines 4,000 to 5,000 years ago.

Ten years of research involving blood samples of 440 Nias people in 11 villages on Nias island showed the Y-chromosome and DNA mitochondria of the Nias people are very similar to the Taiwanese aborigines and Filipino peoples. The observation has also found that the genes in today's Nias people no longer carry any traces of the ancient Nias people, as of those whose remains were found in the Togi Ndrawa cave, Central Nias. Archaeological findings of the stone tools found showed that humans lived in the cave over 12,000 years ago. The genetic diversity of the Nias people is very low compared to other groups of people, especially about the Y chromosome. This indicates that there was once a "bottleneck" population in the history of Nias. Studies have also found that the Nias people do not share any genes with ethnicities living in the Andaman-Nicobar islands in the Indian Ocean, which are geographically considered neighbours. Although it is known that there was a migration of the Austronesian peoples between Taiwan and the Indonesian archipelago including Nias, it is still uncertain if the migration started from Taiwan to Nias or vice versa.

== Characteristics ==
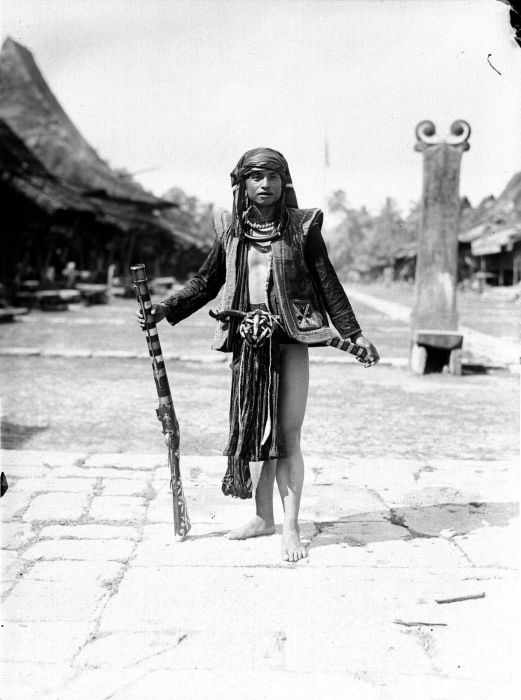
A Nias warrior

1. Body posture: Nias people generally have a medium to tall build. Their average height ranges from 155 cm to 168 cm.
2. Face shape: Nias people's faces tend to be oval with a fairly defined jawline, especially in men.
3. Skin color: Nias people's skin is generally white or light yellow. Some also have tanned skin like most other Indonesians.
4. Hair: Nias people's hair is usually black and tends to be thick.
5. Eyes: One of their most prominent characteristics is their eyes, which tend to be narrow, although not as narrow as those of Chinese people.

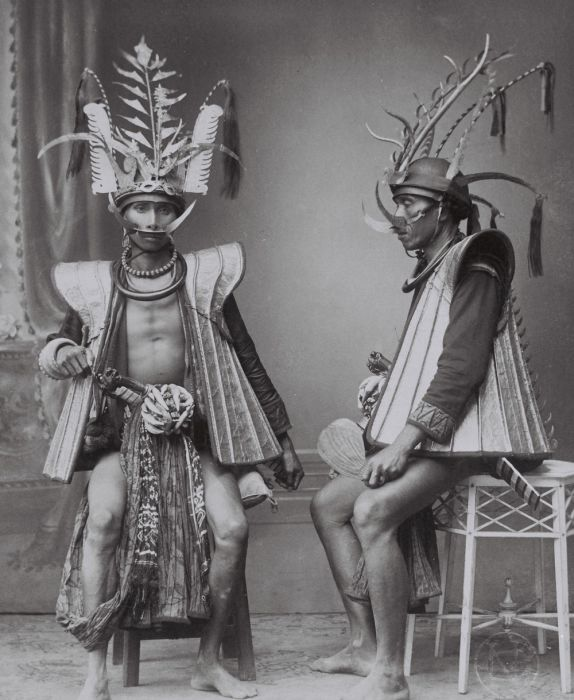
Two Nias wearing a body armor, between 1892 and 1922.

== Distribution in Indonesia ==
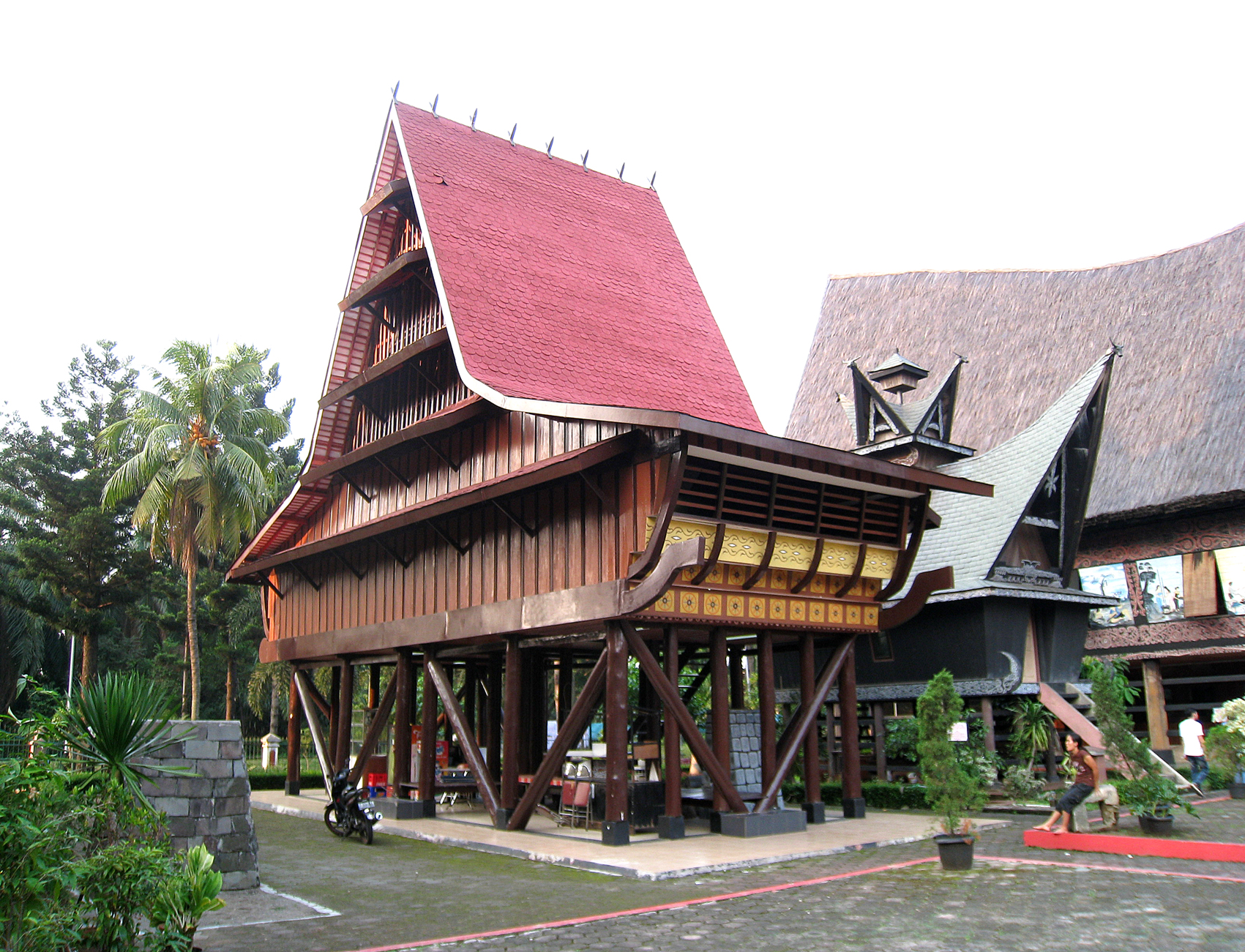
Traditional Nias house (Omo sebua) in Taman Mini Indonesia Indah.

Most people live in North Sumatra Province, specifically on Nias Island. Nias Island is divided into five administrative regions, namely 4 regencies and 1 city. The number of Nias people is quite significant in Riau Province. In the 2010 Indonesian census, the number of Nias people in Indonesia was 1,041,925 people (0.44%) of the 236,728,379 population.

The following is the distribution of Nias people in Indonesia based on official government data from the 2010 Indonesian Population Census, by province:

No	Province	Total (2010)	%
1	North Sumatra	911,820	87.51%
2	Riau	71,537	6.87%
3	West Sumatra	18,239	1.75%
4	Aceh	9,366	0.90%
5	West Java	7,925	0.76%
6	Riau islands	4,676	0.45%
6	Jakarta	4,572	0.44%
6	Jambi	3,574	0.34%
6	other provinces	10,217	0.98%
	Indonesia	1,041,925	100%

== Language ==
=== Dialects ===
The Nias language is generally considered to have three dialects. The northern dialect is spoken in Gunungsitoli, Alasa, and Lahewa, North Nias. The southern dialect is spoken in South Nias. Meanwhile, the central dialect is spoken in West Nias, particularly in Sirombu and Mandrehe, West Nias. Meanwhile, the 1977/1978 Indonesian and Regional Language and Literature Research Project of North Sumatra divided the Nias language into five dialects. The northern dialect is spoken in Alasa and Lahewa; the Gunungsitoli dialect; the western dialect in Mandrehe, Sirombu, and the Hinako Islands; The central dialect is found in Gido, Idano Gawo, Gomo, and Lahusa; and the southern dialect is found in Telukdalam, Tello Island, and the Batu Islands. The similarity between these dialects is as high as 80%.

=== Alphabet ===
The Nias alphabet differs from the Indonesian alphabet. Some elements have been omitted (not used) from the Indonesian alphabet, while others have been added with unique characters (special characters) whose pronunciations are not found in the Indonesian alphabet. The Nias language alphabet uses uppercase and lowercase letters as follows:

Aa, Bb, Dd, Ee, Ff, Gg, Hh, Ii, Kk, Ll, Mm, Nn, Oo, Öö, Rr, Ss, Tt, Uu, Ww, Ŵŵ, Yy, Zz

=== Vocabulary ===
Some Nias language vocabulary and their Indonesian translations can be found at List of Nias Swadesh.

== Nias clans ==
Nias people practice a clan system that follows the paternal lineage, clan are called mado, mado-mado in the Nias language. The same thing is done by the Batak people. Clans generally come from the existing village settlements.

The following are mado-mado used by the Nias. Nias people use mado following the paternal line.

=== A ===
- Amazihönö

=== B ===
- Baeha
- Baene
- Baewa
- Bago
- Bagolö
- Balazi
- Bali
- Baru
- Bate'e
- Baŵaloŵalangi
- Baŵameneŵi
- Baŵ aulu
- Bawö
- Bazikho
- Boha
- Bohalima
- Böröhili
- Börömezaya
- Böwo
- Bu'ulölo
- Bulu'aro
- Bunaŵölö

=== D ===
- Daeli
- Dachi/Dakhi
- Dafulu
- Dandrosa
- Dao
- Daru
- Dauwö
- Daŵölö
- Daya
- Delau
- Delötö
- Dilalö
- Dohare
- Dohöna
- Dohude
- Dolea
- Döwa
- Duha
- Duru
- Duwulani

=== F ===
- Fakho
- Famaugu
- Fanaetu
- Farasi
- Farökha
- Fau
- Fawura
- Finowa'a
- Fondrahi

=== G ===
- Gafore
- Gaho
- Gamazu
- Gamainö
- Gamarö
- Gamöfö
- Ganumba
- Garamba
- Gari
- Gaurifa
- Ge'e
- Gea
- Gehomo
- Giawa
- Göri
- Gowa
- Goŵasa
- Gulla
- Gulö
- Gohae

=== H ===
- Halawa
- Halu
- Harefa
- Haria
- Harimao
- Harita
- Hawa
- Hendri
- Hia
- Hinare
- Hondrö
- Hulu
- Humendru
- Hura

=== L ===
- Laia
- Lafau
- Lahagu
- Lahu
- Lalu
- Laoli
- Laoŵö
- Larosa
- Lase
- La so
- Lature
- Lauwö
- Laŵölö
- Lazira
- Limbu
- Lowalani
- Lö'i
- Lömbu
- Luaha
- Luahamboŵo
- Luo
- Lugu

=== M ===
- Maduŵu
- Manaö
- Manaraja
- Mangiwadanö
- Maru'ao
- Maruhawa
- Marunduri
- Ma'uwu
- Mazulai
- Mendröfa
- Meziwa
- Mola
- Möhö
- Maru’Lafau
- Maru’Abaya

=== N ===
- Nadoya
- Nahönö
- Nakhe
- Namö
- Namölö
- Nanehe
- Naya
- Nazara
- Na'uru
- Ndraha
- Ndruru
- Nehe
- Nene

=== O ===
- Owasaluo

=== S ===
- Sabuanafulu
- Sadumba
- Sao'iagö
- Saota
- Sarahönö
- Sarumaha
- Saufala
- Siawa
- Siba'a
- Sifalaete
- Sihura
- Siyawa
- Si'owasa
- Sisobaene
- Siwa'ahe
- Solokhoi
- Siwanahönö

=== T ===
- Tabalihili
- Taföna'ö
- Telaumbanua
- Talunohi

=== W ===
- Waha
- Wahuwusa
- Ŵakho
- Wandru
- Waö
- Ŵaoma
- Ŵarai
- Warae
- Warökha
- Ŵarasi
- Ŵaruwu
- Ŵate
- Ŵaya
- Ŵa'u
- Wea
- Wehalö

Were

=== Y ===
- Yawazihönö, Yafeti, Yafetali

=== Z ===
- Zai
- Zabölö'ani
- Zagö
- Zagötö
- Zalukhu
- Zamasi
- Zamago
- Zamili
- Zamöno
- Zandroto
- Zebua
- Zega
- Zendratö
- Ziawa
- Zidömi
- Zihönö
- Zikhamö
- Ziliŵu
- Zimali
- Zina
- Ziraluo
- Zolobö
- Zörömi
- Zahuwa

== Culture ==
=== Family system ===
The Nias people practice a Mado system that follows the paternal line (patrilineal). Mado-mado generally come from existing residential villages.

=== Religion ===
The predominant religion is Protestant Christianity. Six out of seven Niasans are Protestant; the remainder are about evenly divided between Muslim and Catholic. Whilst the first missionaries visited Nias in 1865, Christianity grew rapidly in the early 1900s when the Dutch established control of the island, however, was adopted and spread by local ministers.

=== Village and architecture ===
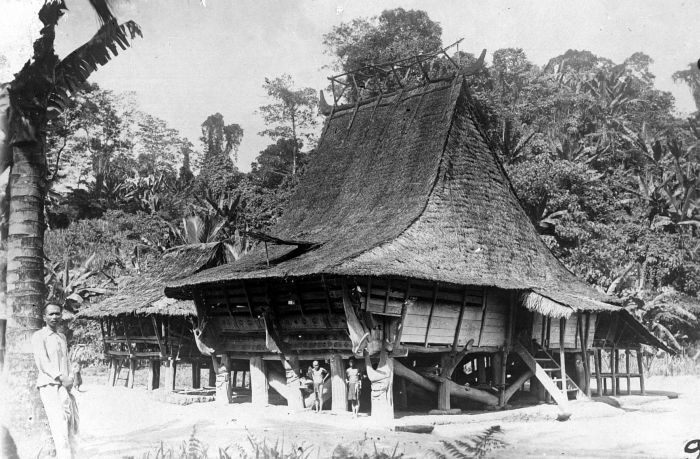
Omo hada', the traditional house of Nias.

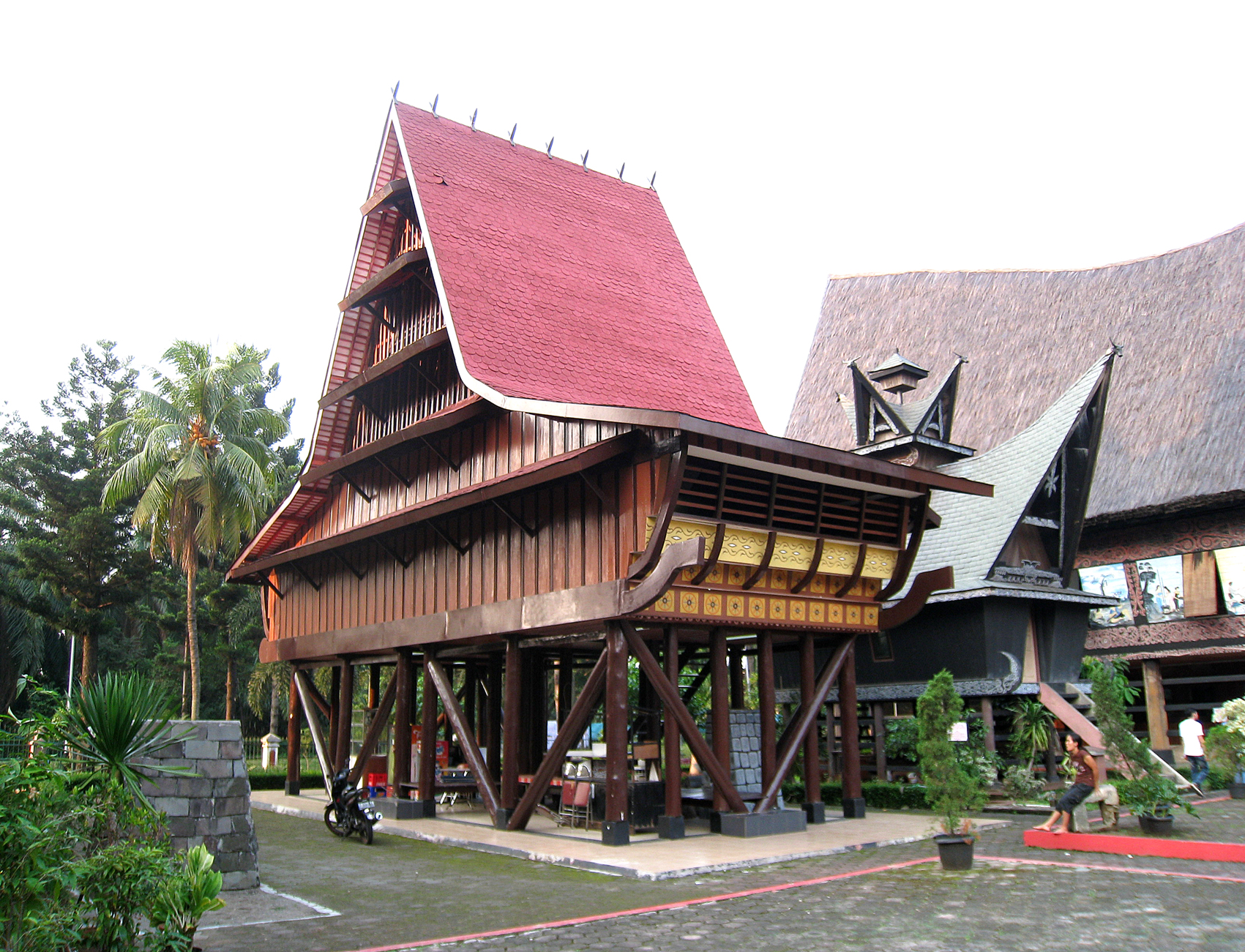
A traditional Nias house at Taman Mini Indonesia Indah

Nias people live in highly organized villages. Nias villages often possess impressive stone monuments and large houses that stand on earthquake-resistant timber pylons. Most of these villages have lost their old houses because of their deterioration and difficulties in maintaining the ancient wooden structures from rot, insects, and wear, and hence replaced by other more generic structures. Another reason why not so many old houses were rebuilt is because of the over-harvesting of the forests.

In the past, Nias villages, especially those of South Nias, were strategically built on top of a ridge or hill and were surrounded by ramparts and security gates. Entry into this village was provided by only two gates via steep staircases. The gates lead to a straight paved avenue that runs through the village center, with a row of traditional houses on the sides of the avenue. Close to the main square of the village was the house of the village founders, the omo sebua. In Nias villages, the space in front of each house was the property of the inhabitants. This "front courtyard" was used for mundane activities e.g. drying harvests before storing them.

Villages in Central Nias were usually smaller than their southern counterpart. The houses are also positioned farther away from the main avenue.

=== Wooden figures ===
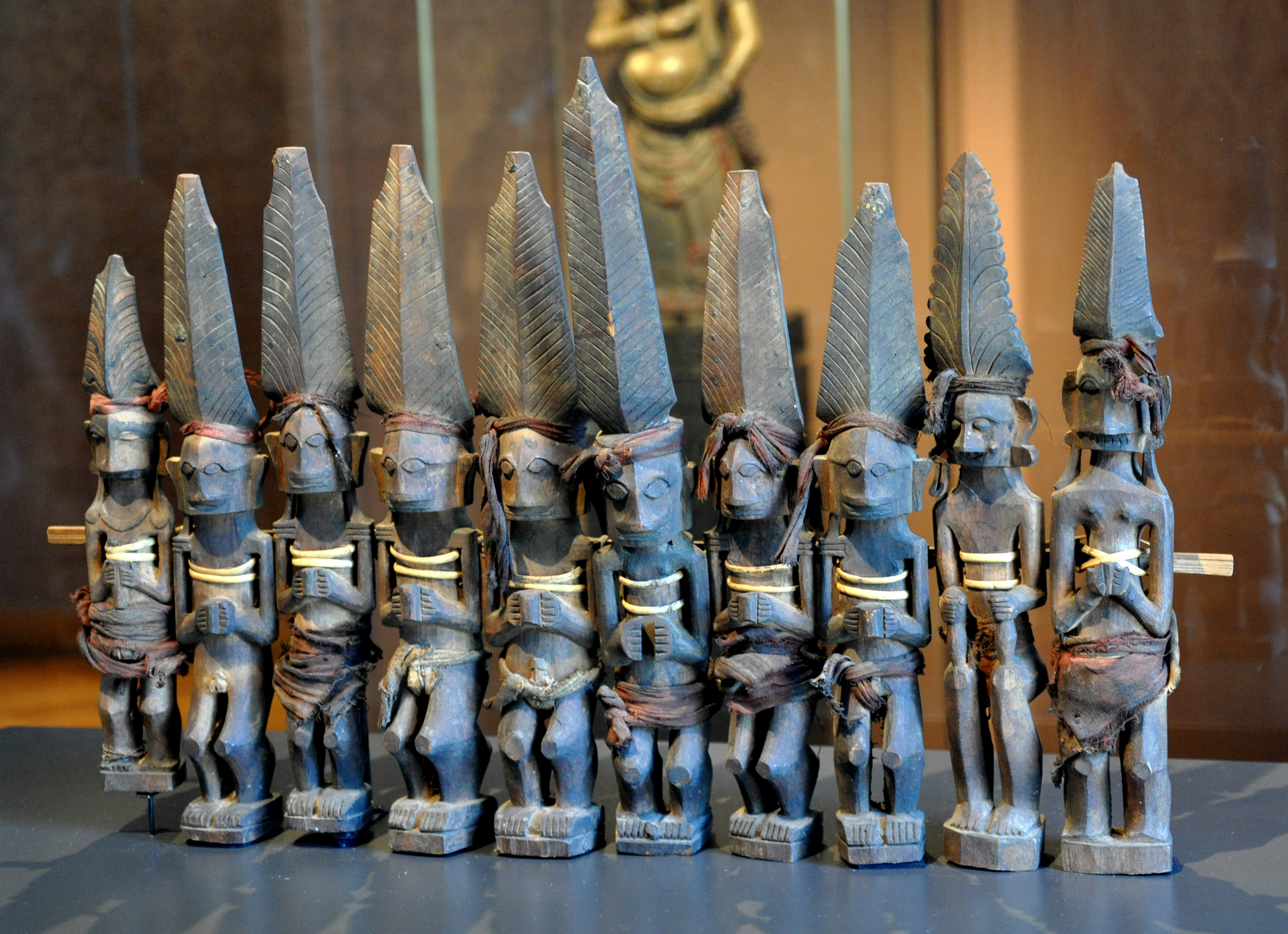
The adu zatua (wooden ancestor statues).

The people of Nias placed great value on wooden figures or adu. The sole purpose of the Nias figures was to fulfill ritual needs, whether it was to ensure wealth or to perform specific beneficial rites. Niassan figures vary in size, from as small as 20 centimetres (7.9 in) in height to more than 2 metres (6.6 ft) tall.

When an elderly person died, the family would make a wooden statue known as adu zatua. The statue was unveiled on the fourth day after the death of the person. The shape of the wooden statue reflects the status of the person who used it: the more powerful the owner, the more impressive the statue will be. Nias people believed that the deceased person's spirits resided in the statue, so all events that occurred in the family were shared with the ancestor statues through prayers. Ancestor figures were believed to ensure fertility for the family, livestock, and agricultural land. Sacrifices were made to the ancestor statues, especially on important events e.g. births, marriages, and deaths. Ancestor statues were placed in the main room of the house, sometimes more than a hundred. Missionary work in 1930 had recorded the removal of 'over 2000 "idols" from the house of a new northern convert.' Some missionaries even recorded houses collapsing under the weight of these ancestor figures. Small adu zatua were bound together horizontally using rattan and pegs.

In North Nias, a large impressive ancestor figure is known as adu suraha salawa (Nias language for "portraits of honored ancestors"). The adu suraha salawa represents the first known ancestor of a family, often the founder of the village. The adu suraha salawa were usually placed on a wall or on an altar (daro-daro). Another large ancestor statues are the adu hörö. Adu hörö ancestor statues are large, elongated, armless, and wear high, forked headdresses. These statues are generally found in Central Nias, and rarely in South Nias.

Other wooden figures do not represent the ancestors. These wooden figures were created to heal specific illnesses, protect villages, or invoke supernatural beings to aid through rituals. These statues were generally crudely made, as opposed to the finely carved ancestor figures. Joachim von Brenner-Felsach classified more than 60 types of non-ancestor wooden figures.

Many ancestor figures were destroyed in 1916 by Christian missionary movements which saw them as an old blasphemous religious symbol. Some were sold to collectors and can be found in museums or private collections around the world.

=== Stone monuments ===
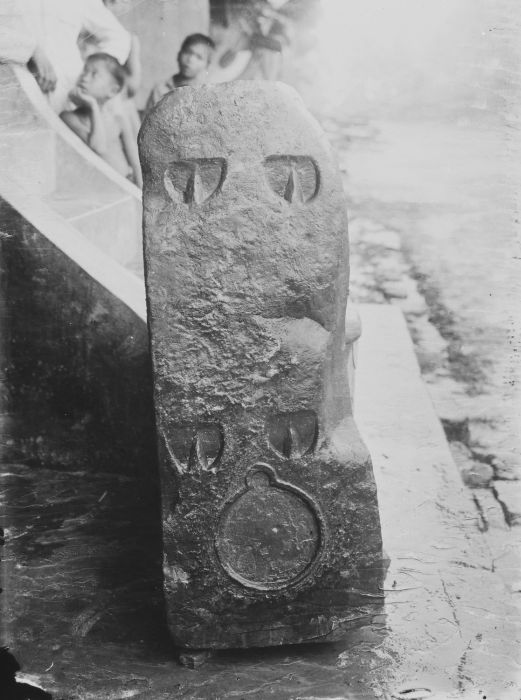
A stone monument in front of a house to signify the power and rank of the host.

The Nias produced one of the most impressive megalith cultures in Indonesia, especially the Center and South Nias. Stones were used to construct different objects and structures. Nias village features impressive stoneworks e.g. large staircases and broad paved streets. Ritual objects e.g. the behu (vertical column), standing columns, jumping stones, obelisks, altars, and sarcophagi are among the many stone objects produced by the Nias people.

Stone monuments were central to the Owasa festival, a kind of feast to raise the rank of a person. Dedicating stone monuments publicly is considered one of the several requirements that must be done by a person to prove that he has fulfilled the right to claim a higher rank and to receive honorary titles.

The behu is a type of megalith in the form of a vertical column. Behu was erected in front of the house of the host to commemorate former great celebrations held by the host. The more behu displayed in front of the host's house, the more powerful his position is in the village. Noblemen display behu that is larger and more abundant in numbers than the commoners. A behu with an anthropomorphic form is known as the osa-osa. The osa-osa is depicted as wearing traditional Nias attire e.g. the kalabubu necklace and pendant earrings (fondulu or saro dalinga). The osa-osa's head is that of the various beasts, usually a lasara (a mythical animal with the body of a deer and a dragon's head), a hornbill, a stag, or a multi-headed mixture of all. Before displaying the osa-osa in front of houses, they were paraded around the village with the host seated, or even standing on top of the osa-osa.

=== Megalithic sites ===
- Bitaha megalithic site 0°58′42.30″N 97°36′59.45″E
- Tundrumbaho megalithic site 0°51′46.19″N 97°49′54.76″E
- Tetegewo megalithic site 0°49′56.92″N 97°49′43.61″E
- Lahusa Satua megalithic site 0°51′24.92″N 97°50′1.47″E

=== Household objects ===
Nias people produce household objects carved with zoomorphic, floral, or geometric motifs. Below is a list of implements and provisions manufactured by the Nias people.

- Bari gana'a: A miniature jewellery box.
- Bowoa Tanö: Clay pot
- Doghi (North Nias); fogao, dröghija (South Nias): A wooden coconut grater used to grate coconut meat to produce coconut milk or coconut oil, an important ingredient in Nias cuisine.
- Figa lae: Banana leaf used as plates
- Halu: A paddy pounder
- Haru: A wooden spoon, the base of the handle is carved with various forms e.g. a fist.
- Katidi: Weavings from bamboo
- Lösu: Mortar and pestle
- Niru: A tool to separate rice from its husk
- Gala: Tray-like item made of wood
- Sole Mbanio: A drinking container made from coconut shell
- Tumba, lauru: A tankard used to weigh rice

=== Weapons ===
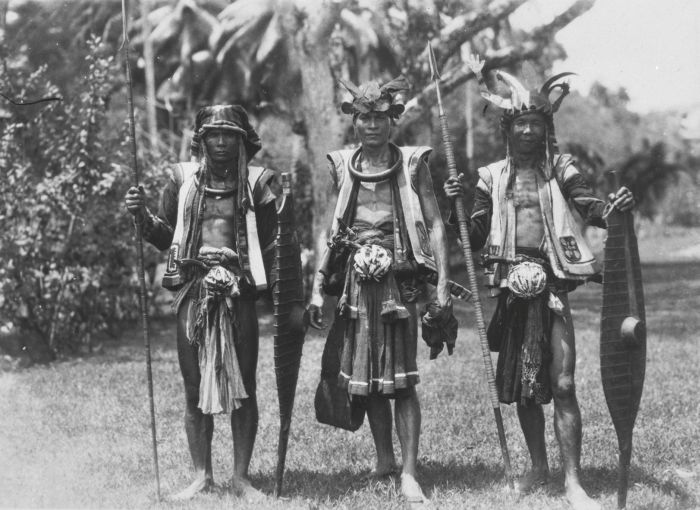
A group of Nias warriors holding the Baluse (shield) and Burusa (spear), and with Balato (sword) at the side of their waist.

Today the Nias people are almost always presented as a warlike people known for their headhunting tradition and inter-village conflicts in the past, where the manufacture of weapons was highly regarded above agricultural implements. Despite this, none of the war-like activities are carried out by the Nias people as the majority of the Nias people have been converted to Christianity. Nevertheless, the Nias people were still known as a skillful weapon and armor-makers.

The Nias people used a variety of materials for the creation of their weaponry: leather, cord or woven fibres, precious metal, iron, and brass. The Nias used spears, swords and blades as their weapon. The Nias spear (toto'a doho in the south, toho in the north) was mainly used for hunting; the shaft is made of dark hardwood of nibung palm wrapped with rattan. Another type of spear is the burusa, with a triangle-shaped head. The Nias sword (gari) is a combat weapon; both the sword and its sheath have a simple undecorated form. The most well-known of the Nias weapons is the balato or tolögu, a steel sword with a protective amulet believed to possess magical power. The balato has a hilt made of brass. The sheath of the balato contains a spherical bundle of rattan (ragö balatu) which performed as a protective amulet. This protective amulet is usually attached to a variety of objects e.g. animal fangs which are formed so that it looks like the jaw of the mythical lasara. The balato is only reserved for the highest nobles as a kind of proof of the authority and the social rank of its owner.

Some prominent chiefs covered their armor with sheets of gold. Helmets can be made of iron or tightly woven palm fibers. The oval-shaped shield is known as the baluse in South Nias, while the North Nias produced a hexagonal-shaped shield known as the dange.

=== Cuisine ===
- Gowi Nihandro or Gowi Nitutu: Pounded cassava
- Harinake: Minced pork
- Godo-godo: Shredded cassava shaped into balls for boiling, and later with added coconut flakes
- Köfö-köfö: Minced fish meat shaped into balls to be dried or smoked
- Ni'owuru: Salted pork for longer storage
- Rakigae: Fried bananas
- Tamböyö: Ketupat
- löma: Lemang
- Gae Nibogö: Grilled bananas
- Kazimone: Made of sago
- Wawayasö: Glutinous rice
- Gulo-Gulo Farö: Candy made from distillate coconut milk
- Bato: Compressed crab meat shaped into balls for longer storage as found on Hinako Islands
- Nami: Salted crab eggs for longer storage, sometimes for months depending on the quantity of salt used
- Tuo nifarö: Palm wine
- Tuo mbanua: Raw palm wine with added laru, roots of various plants to give a certain amount of alcohol

=== Clothing and ornaments ===
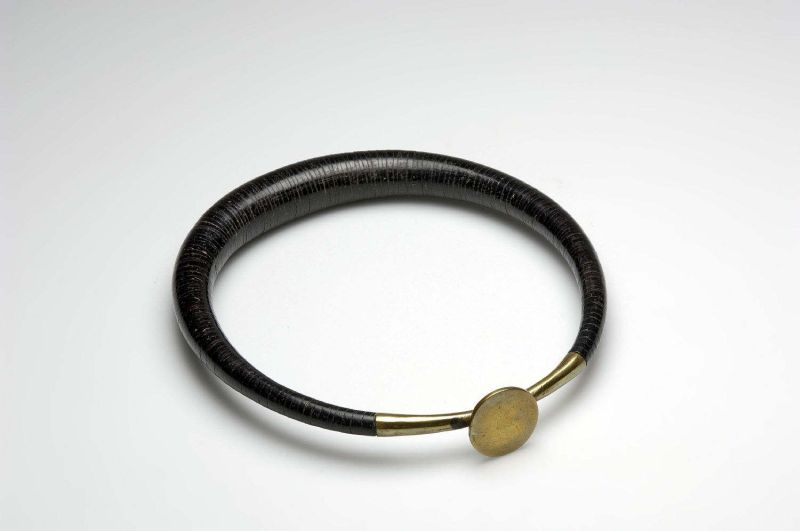
The kalabubu is traditionally only worn by those who already performed the headhunting activities.

- Fondruru, men's earring made of precious metal.
- Kalabubu, also known as the headhunter's necklace.
- Nifatali-tali, a necklace of precious metal.
- Nifato-fato, a men's necklace of precious metal.
- Suahu, a comb of wood or precious metal.

=== Traditional proverbs ===
- Hulö ni femanga mao, ihene zinga ("Like a cat that eats, starting from the sides"): When doing something, start from the easiest to the difficult.
- Hulö la'ewa nidanö ba ifuli fahalö-halö ("Just like chopping the water, it will still remain"): Something that is inseparable.
- Abakha zokho safuria moroi ba zi oföna ("The wound is more severe at the later stage than the beginning"): A course of action can be felt the most towards the end.

=== Other traditional practices ===
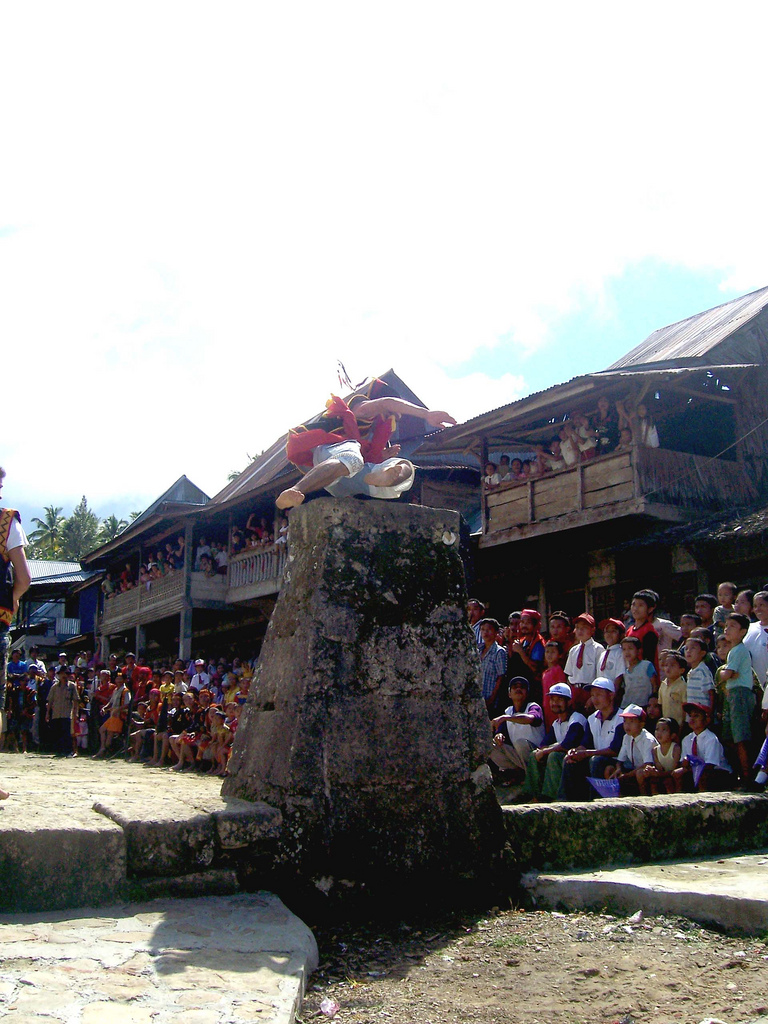
Nias men taking part in Fahombo

- Fahombo: Leaping over the rock
- Fatele or Faluya or Faluaya: War dance
- Maena: Group dance
- Tari Moyo: Eagle dance
- Tari Mogaele
- Fangowai: Welcoming of guest dance
- Fame Ono Nihalö: Weddings
- Omo Hada: Traditional house
- Fame'e Töi Nono Nihalö: Given name of a married women
- Fasösö Lewuö: Bamboo competition among young men to test one's strength

=== Decline ===
Deterioration in Niassan culture began to occur since the end of the 19th-century. Missionary works had contributed to the decline of original Nias culture. Evangelization in Nias such as those performed by the German Protestant Rhenish Missionary Society had been responsible to the destruction of Niassan wooden statues as well the suppression of the unique culture of Nias society e.g. ancestor worship, magical practices, the Owasa festivals (noblemen rank-elevation festivals) headhunting and slave trading. However, since 1955, conservation of the traditional culture of the Ono Niha has improved tremendously by the Roman Catholic Church through cultural integration into liturgy, architecture and art."

== Notable people ==
- Yasonna Hamonangan Laoly, S.H., M.Sc., Ph.D, Minister of Law and Human Rights (2014–2019; 2019–2024)
- Suahasil Nazara, Minister of Finance of Indonesia (2026–present) Deputy President Commissioner of the State Electricity Company
- P.R. Telaumbanua, former Governor of North Sumatra
- Marinus Gea, SE., M.Ak., DPR RI from 2014 to 2024
- Christian Zebua, Major General of the Indonesian National Armed Forces, Commander of the Military District Kodam XVII/Cendrawasih
- Binahati B. Baeha, Regent of Nias for two terms, 2001–2006 and 2006–2011
- Thevi Angandowa Zebua, Brigadier General of the Indonesian National Armed Forces Commander of the Kopassus Special Forces Training Center
- Hidayat Manaö, Brigadier General TNI, Supreme Justice of the Republic of Indonesia
- Bahagia Dachi, Brigadier General of the Police, Chief Policy Analyst for Narcotics Crimes at the Criminal Investigation Agency of the Indonesian National Police
- Abdi Iman Sakti Zebua, Colonel of Infantry, Grade IV Expert Staff of the Army Strategic Reserves Command (Kostrad) for the Defense and Defense System (Sishanneg) Division
- Jonny Harianto Gulo, Colonel of Cavalry, Expert Staff for Legal and Humanitarian Affairs, Expert Staff for the Commander of the IX/Udayana Military Command
- Yulianus Zebua, Colonel of the Navy, Head of the Sub-Department of the Regional Military Command of the Indonesian Military
- Historis Bu’ulölö, Colonel of Aviation, Head of the First Division of the Development and Development Program of the Military Command of the Indonesian Military
- Sokhiatulo Laoli, Regent of Nias
- Hilarius Duha, Regent of South Nias
- Khenoki Waruwu, Regent of West Nias
- Amizaro Waruwu, Regent of North Nias
- Lakhomizaro Zebua, former Mayor of Gunungsitoli for the 2016-2024 period
- Sowa'a Laoli, Mayor of Gunungsitoli
- Faduhusi Daely, Regent of West Nias for the 2016-2021 Period
- Ya'atulö Gulö, S.E., SH., MSi, Regent of Nias
- AKBP Peniel Zalukhu, S.H.|Peniel Zalukhu, S.H. Duties of the Riau Regional Police
- Samazasa Ndruru, Ono Niha Traditional Leader of the Riau Region
- Sökhiatulo Laia (Talabu), CEO of PT. TALABU
- Drs. Sozifao Hia, M.Si. Member of the DPRD of Pelalawan Regency, Riau
- Eta Etesman Buulolo, S.E., General Chair of the Student Association of Nias Riau 2017-209. Riau

== Gallery ==
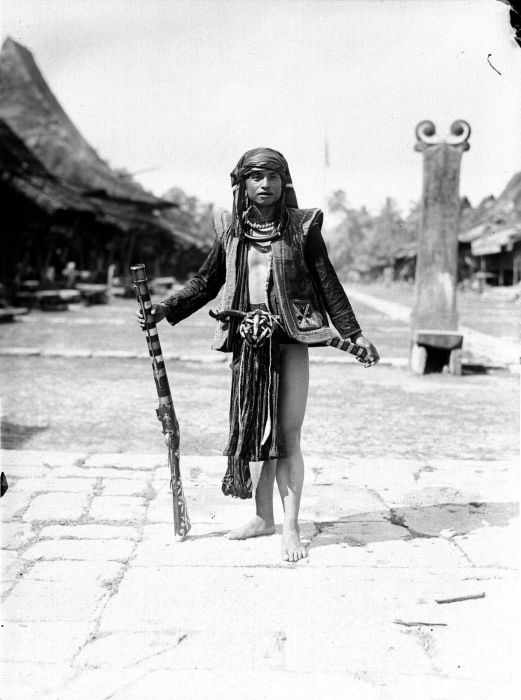
A Nias warrior

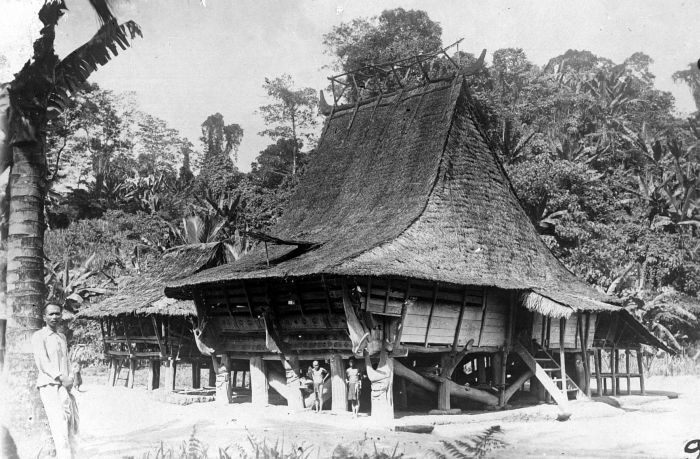
Omo sebua, traditional house of the Nias people

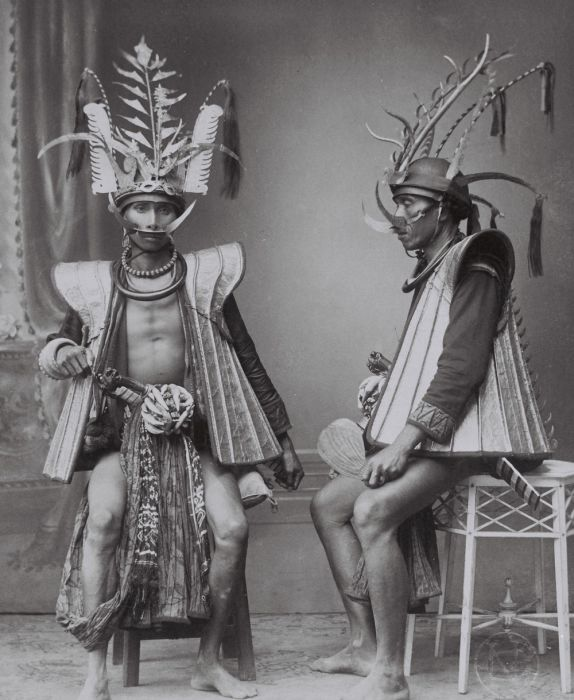
Nias body armor, Baru Öröba

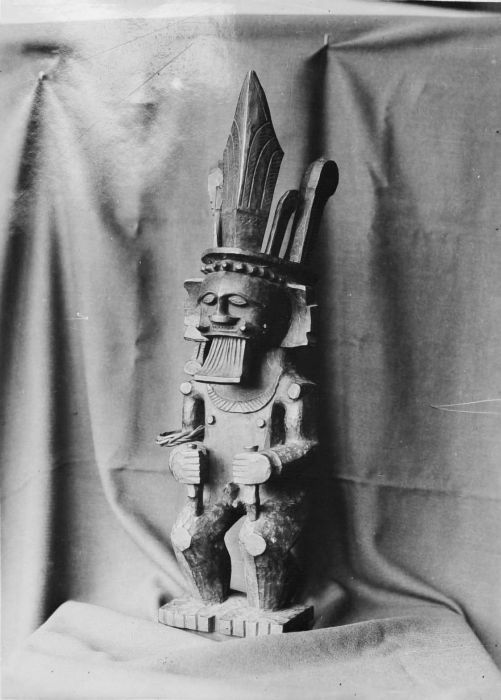
Nias ancestral statue

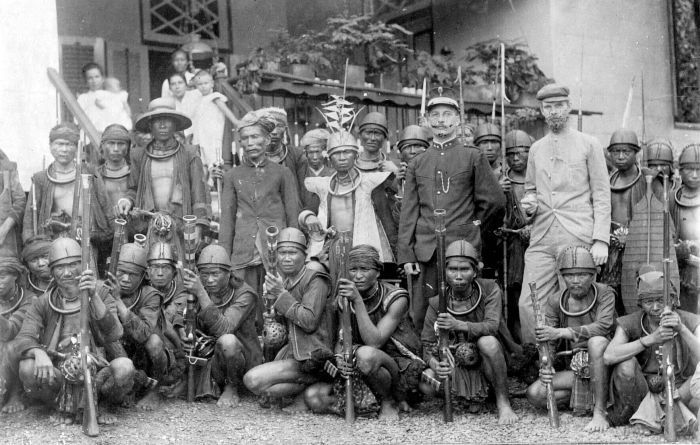
A group of Nias headhunters surrendered to the Dutch

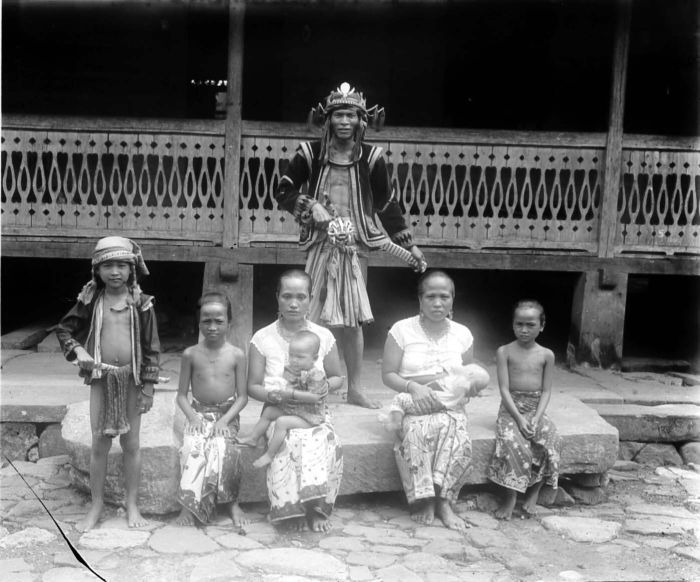
Nias family

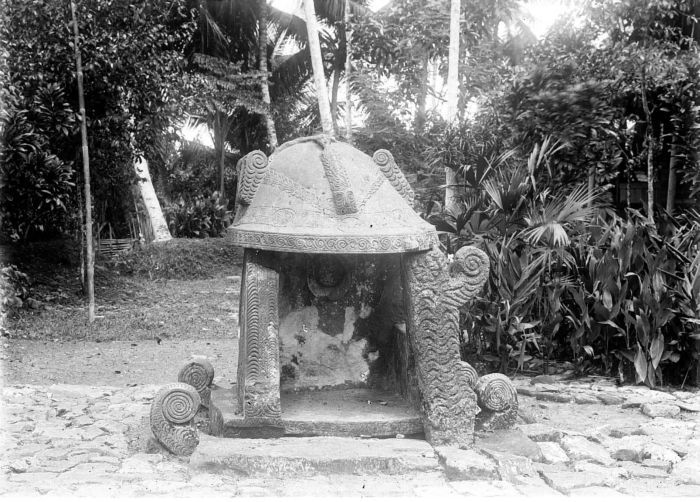
Nias offering place

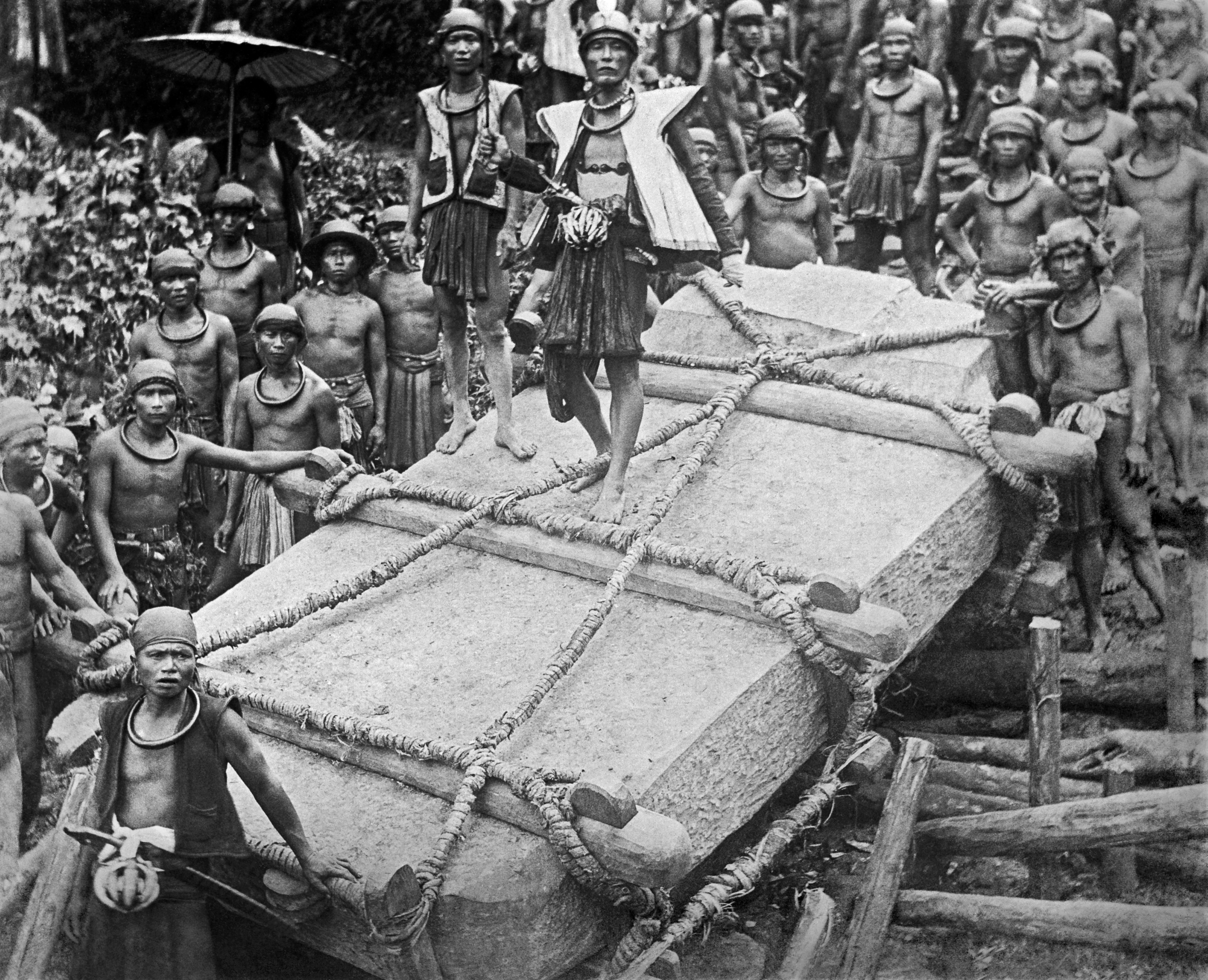
Nias people move a megalith to a development area

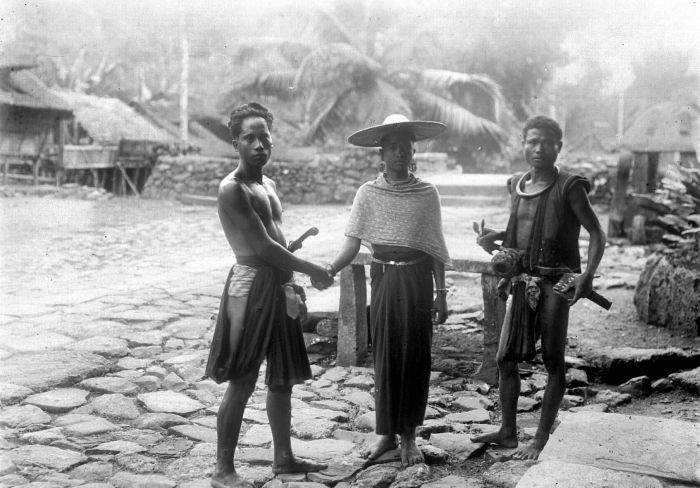
Nias Bride and Groom

== See also ==
- Mentawai Islands
- Mentawai people
- Nias Expedition
- Omo sebua
- Nias language
- Austronesian expansion
- Proto-Malay
- Gari (sword)
- Simeulue
- Sipora
- Siberut

== Notes ==
=== Bibliography ===
- Lase, Apolonius (2011). Kamus Liniha Nias - Indonesia. Penerbit Buku Kompas. ISBN 9789797095413.
- Sibeth, Achim; Carpenter, Bruce W.; Meyers, Koen (2013). Nias Sculpture: Mandala Collection. Red & White Publishing. ISBN 9789791008723.
- Suhadi Hadiwinoto (2008). Nias, dari masa lalu ke masa depan. Badan Pelestarian Pusaka Indonesia. ISBN 978-9791801911.
- Suzuki, Peter (1958). Critical Survey of Studies On The Anthropology of Nias, Mentawei and Enggano. M. Nijhoff. ASIN B007T32XL0.
- Volkenkundig Museum Nusantara (1990). Nias: tribal treasures: cosmic reflections in stone, wood, and gold. Delft: Volkenkundig Museum Nusantara. ISBN 9789071423055.
