= Kalabubu =

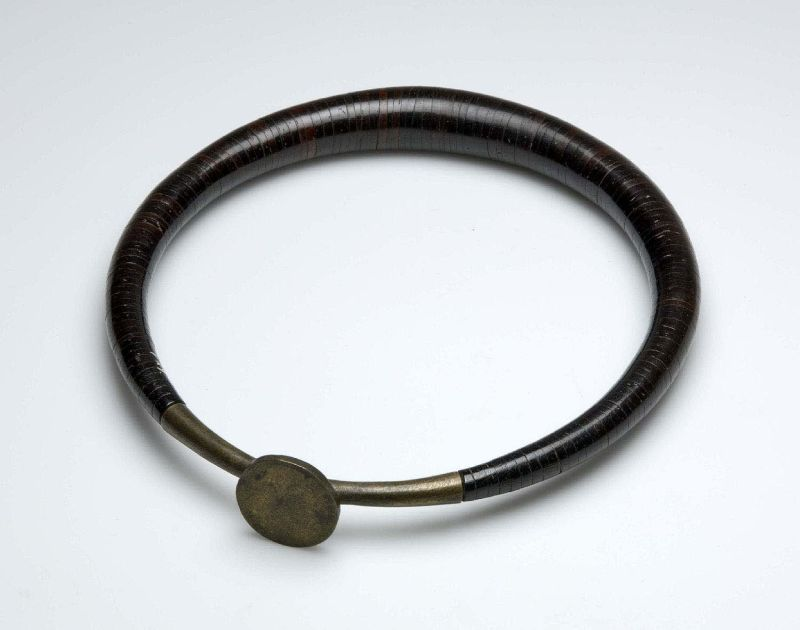
The Kalabubu of South Nias.

Kalabubu, sometimes spelled Kala bubu, is a torc (stiff circular necklace) worn by warriors of the people of South Nias of North Sumatra, Indonesia. Kalabubu symbolizes triumph in warfare and heroism. Wearing a kalabubu was believed to protect the wearer from harm. Kalabubu is popularly known as the "headhunter's necklace"; historically only those who already decapitated the head of the enemy tribes are allowed to wear the kalabubu.

== Form and construction ==
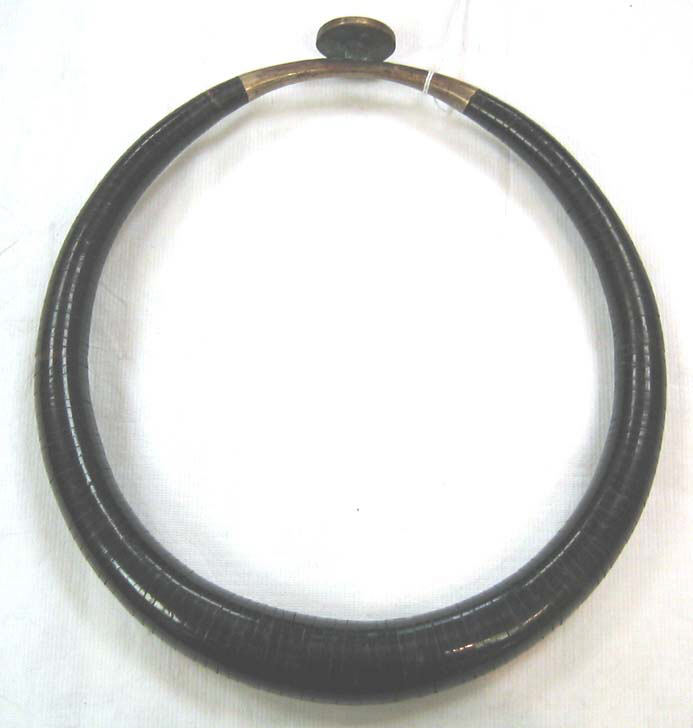
Kalabubu is constructed of coconut shell slices and brass wire.

Kalabubu is circular in form with diameter between 22 centimetres (8.7 in) to 25 centimetres (9.8 in). The thickness of the kalabubu differs with the center part wider and then gradually smaller at both ends. The shrinking ends are connected to form either a disk, either of brass or rarely of gold. The internal frame of a kalabubu is made out of an iron or brass wire which is tied at the end. The tying at the end is shaped like a disk. Disk-shaped slices of coconut shell (or sometimes turtle shell) are fitted around the internal brass frame. The disk are cut progressively larger at the front center of the ring, and smaller at the end. The disk slices are then pressed together and then sanded and polished until they have a completely smooth surface. Finally they are dyed black.

The internal brass frame of a kalabubu represents the great golden serpent of Nias mythology.

== Symbol ==
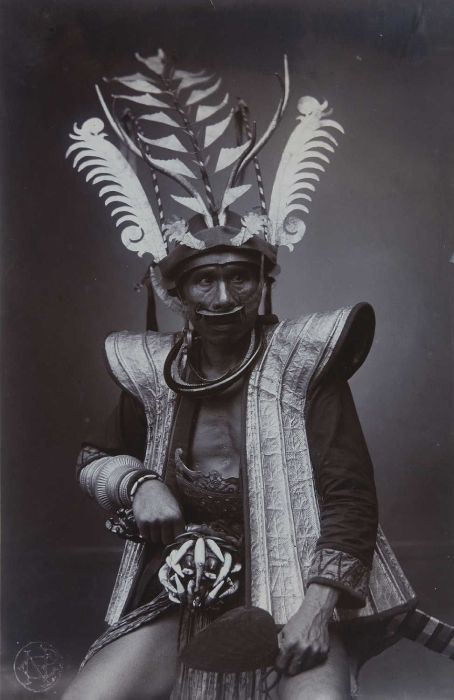
A Nias man dressed as a warrior with the kalabubu around his neck.

Kalabubu is associated with tribal warfare and the practice of headhunting (mangai binu). The kalabubu symbolizes masculinity, triumph in warfare, heroism, and warrior. Historically, only men that have demonstrated prowess in warfare and have decapitated the head of the enemy were allowed to wear the kalabubu. The wearer is usually seen as a kind of warrior hero of the village. The Kalabubu is also worn during the ceremonial war dance. Nowadays, most Nias men wear the kalabubu.

The kalabubu is featured in the seal of the South Nias Regency.

== Variation ==
In northern Nias, a necklace known as nifitali-tali is the precious metal variation of the kalabubu. The nifitali-tali were exclusively worn by high ranking men on festive occasions e.g. the owasa feast. Unlike the southern examples, the nifitali-tali is always finished with precious metal such as silver or gold.

== See also ==
- Nias people
- Omo sebua

== Cited works ==
- Marschall, Wolfgang (2013). "Zwei emblematische Paneele in einem Haus in Süd Nias (Indonesien)" [Two emblematic panels in a house in South Nias (Indonesia)]. Archiv 61-62 - Archive Weltmuseum Wien (in German). Wien. ISBN 9783643998378. ISSN 0066-6513.
- Muhammad Husni; Tiarma Rita Siregar (2000). Perhiasan Tradisional Indonesia [Traditional Ornaments of Indonesia]. Direktorat Jenderal Kebudayaan.
- Richter, Anne; Carpenter, Bruce W. (2012). Gold Jewellery of the Indonesian Archipelago. Editions Didier Millet. ISBN 9789814260381.
