= Klebit Bok =

Traditional shield of Dayak of Borneo

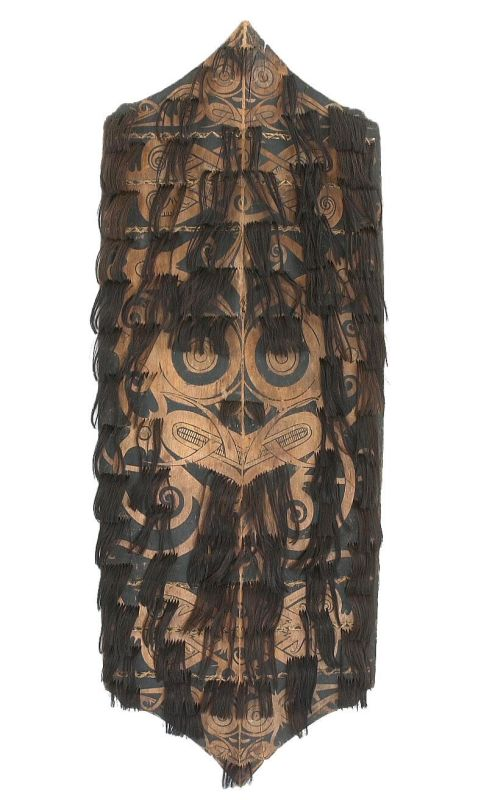
- A Klebit Bok shield, circa 1875–1925.
- Type: Shield
- Place of origin: Borneo (East Kalimantan, North Kalimantan, West Kalimantan, Indonesia & Sarawak, Malaysia)

Service history
- Used by: Kayan people (Borneo), Kenyah people

Specifications
- Length: 110–130 cm (43–51 in)

The Klebit Bok or Kelembit Bok or Kelavit Bok is the traditional shield of the Kelabit, Kayan and the Kenyah people originating from Borneo. It is similar to the shields used by other Dayak people such as the Terabai of the Iban.

== Description ==
The Klebit Bok is a shield in a shape of a hexagon and painted on both sides. On its front, three demonic faces are often painted, in red, white and black and arranged vertically. Their staring, round eyes and grotesquely fanged mouths are surrounded by tufts of human hair attached with resin.

The front is richly decorated with clumps of human hair forcefully pressed into the narrow cracks of wood before being secured by means of fresh wax. The hair is allegedly from hunted heads. It completes the designs, making the shield all the more terrifying for one's enemies.

The reverse of the shield frequently depicts one or two figures whose heads and limbs dissolve into fantastic tendrils. Its name is derived from klebit (meaning "shield") and bok (meaning "hair") indicating a strong connection between the shield and the hair with which it is decorated.

== See also ==
- Kurabit
- Baluse
