= Neoserica batoeana =

Scientific classification
- Kingdom: Animalia
- Phylum: Arthropoda
- Clade: Pancrustacea
- Class: Insecta
- Order: Coleoptera
- Suborder: Polyphaga
- Infraorder: Scarabaeiformia
- Family: Scarabaeidae
- Genus: Neoserica
- Species: N. batoeana

Binomial name
- Neoserica batoeana Moser, 1916

Species of beetle

Neoserica batoeana is a species of beetle of the family Scarabaeidae. It is found in Indonesia (Batu Islands).

== Description ==
Adults reach a length of about 8 mm. They are dull, blackish-brown above and brown below. The frons is tomentose and finely punctate and the antennae are yellowish-brown. The pronotum is densely covered with minutely bristle-bearing punctures. The elytra have rows of punctures, with the very weakly convex spaces between them extensively covered with tiny bristle-bearing punctures.
