= Balato (sword) =

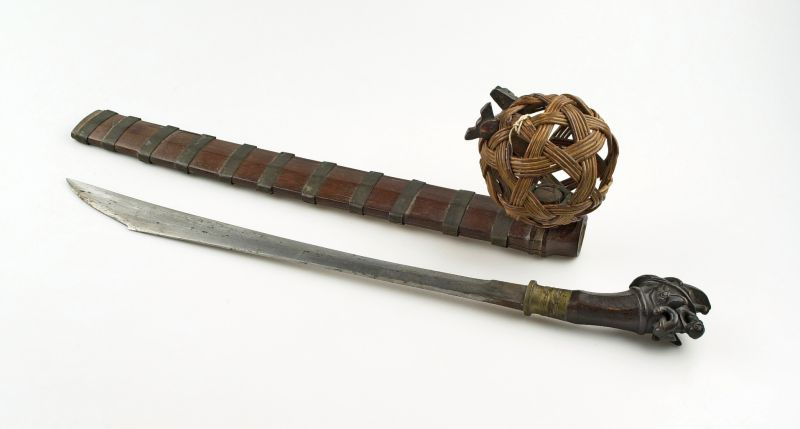
- A Balato sword, pre-1918.
- Type: Sword
- Place of origin: Indonesia (Nias)

Service history
- Used by: Nias people

Specifications
- Length: 50–90 cm (20–35 in)
- Blade type: Single edge, convex grind
- Hilt type: Wood
- Scabbard/sheath: Wood

Balato (sometimes also known as Baltoe, Balatu, Balatu Sebua, Ballatu, Foda, Gari Telegu, Klewang Buchok Berkait, Roso Sebua or Telagoe) is a sword that originates from Nias, an island off the west coast of North Sumatra, Indonesia.

== Description ==
Balato is a sword with a large variety of blades, hilts and scabbards. Three types of blades can be distinguished, all broadening at the point:

- with an almost straight blade back and straight edge. The cutting edge is rounded from place to back.
- with an almost straight back and a straight or slightly concave cutting edge, while the back S-shape runs to the cutting edge at the site.
- with a slightly convex back, a slightly concave edge and a strong concave section at the location (Bowie form).

The hilts are very varied, but all can be reduced to an animal's head or mouth, most of the time the lasara (mythical creature), made in a plain stylized way or in a complex, richly decorated form. Most of this hilts are made from wood, but brass ones do occur. Wooden hilts have brass ferrule broadening towards the blade.

The scabbard is made of wood with brass or rattan bindings along the scabbard. Often a round rattan basket is attached to the scabbard to keep various amulets in. Normally, the southern Balatos have more decorated baskets on their scabbards compared to the northern region.

== Culture ==
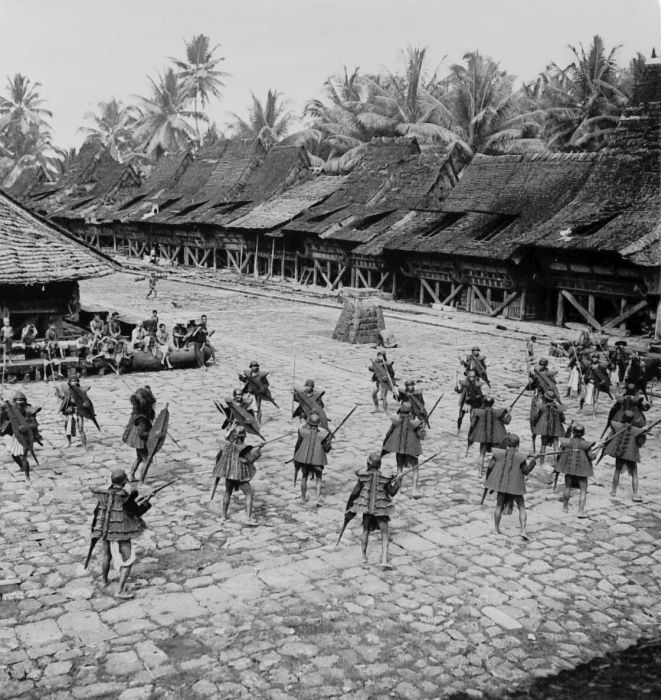
A Faluaya dance or war dance of the Nias people, pre 1954.

In South Nias, the locals practice a war dance called Faluaya (or Fataele) dance. In this dance, the dancers wore colorful clothing consists of black, yellow and red, fitted with a crown on the head. Like a knight in battle, dancers also carry Baluse (shields), swords and spears as a means of defense from enemy attack. The Baluse that were used are made of wood shaped like banana leaves and are held on the left hand which serves to deflect enemy attacks, while the sword or spear in the right hand serves to counter enemy attacks. Both of these weapons are the main weapons used for fighting by a Nias knight.

In those days, young men in the village were required to leap over the rock of 2 m (6 ft 7 in) in height during the Fahombo (or Hombo Batu) ceremony in order to attain adulthood. This would also signify that those men are able to protect and to defend their village once achieving adulthood. Therefore, the Si'ulu (village head) would form a Fataele team and recruit these men. In the past, the Nias people were feared for their headhunting practices. It is believed that the victims of headhunting will become their servants in the afterlife. Today, headhunting are no longer practiced as majority of the Nias population are Protestant Christians.

== See also ==
- Gari, another sword from Nias
- Pirah
