= Teluk Dalam =

Coordinates: 0.55°N 97.8°E

Teluk Dalam (also written as Telukdalam) is a town and district in the South Nias Regency, North Sumatra province, Indonesia. Following the splitting off of parts of the original district to form new districts, it is now mainly confined to the town, and its area is now 110.11 km^{2} (42.51 sq mi). In English, Teluk Dalam means "Deep Bay". As of mid-2023, Telukdalam had a population of 26,456 and a population density of 240 per km^{2}. Telukdalam has various tourist sites, such as Sorake Beach, Lagundri Beach, and Bawömataluo which hosted Nias traditional houses of hundred years ago.

== History ==
Telukdalam port came about after the original port in the south of Nias Island was in Teluk Lagundri (Lagundri Bay), further to the west along Nias's south coast. In 1883, the resulting tsunami from the Krakatau volcano in the Sunda Strait between Sumatra and Java washed the original Teluk Lagundri trade village away. The trade village was moved to the present position in Teluk Dalam.

On 28 March 2005, the 2005 Nias–Simeulue earthquake destroyed many ancient sites and many people were killed. On 2 April 2005, an Australian Sea King helicopter carrying 11 soldiers on a humanitarian mission to help the earthquake victims crashed there, killing nine soldiers.

== Climate ==
Teluk Dalam has a tropical rainforest climate (Af) with heavy to very heavy rainfall year-round.

Climate data for Teluk Dalam
Month	Jan	Feb	Mar	Apr	May	Jun	Jul	Aug	Sep	Oct	Nov	Dec	Year
Mean daily maximum °C (°F)	31.9 (89.4)	32.1 (89.8)	32.3 (90.1)	32.2 (90.0)	32.3 (90.1)	32.1 (89.8)	31.8 (89.2)	31.6 (88.9)	31.2 (88.2)	31.0 (87.8)	31.0 (87.8)	31.1 (88.0)	31.7 (89.1)
Daily mean °C (°F)	26.9 (80.4)	26.9 (80.4)	27.3 (81.1)	27.3 (81.1)	27.4 (81.3)	27.0 (80.6)	26.6 (79.9)	26.5 (79.7)	26.5 (79.7)	26.5 (79.7)	26.6 (79.9)	26.6 (79.9)	26.8 (80.3)
Mean daily minimum °C (°F)	21.9 (71.4)	21.8 (71.2)	22.3 (72.1)	22.5 (72.5)	22.5 (72.5)	21.9 (71.4)	21.5 (70.7)	21.5 (70.7)	21.8 (71.2)	22.1 (71.8)	22.2 (72.0)	22.1 (71.8)	22.0 (71.6)
Average rainfall mm (inches)	216 (8.5)	211 (8.3)	242 (9.5)	261 (10.3)	214 (8.4)	209 (8.2)	197 (7.8)	258 (10.2)	292 (11.5)	407 (16.0)	375 (14.8)	331 (13.0)	3,213 (126.5)
Source: Climate-Data.org
