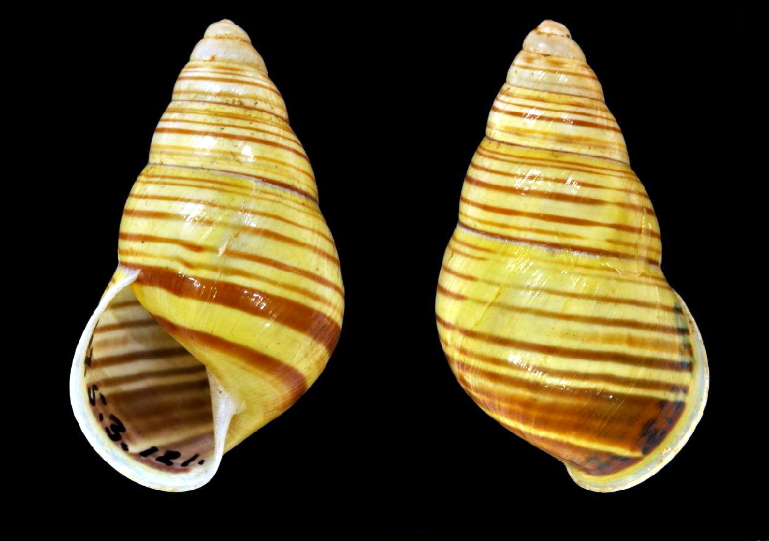
- Shell of Amphidromus sowerbyi (lectotype at the Natural History Museum, London)

Scientific classification
- Kingdom: Animalia
- Phylum: Mollusca
- Class: Gastropoda
- Order: Stylommatophora
- Family: Camaenidae
- Genus: Amphidromus
- Species: A. sowerbyi

Binomial name
- Amphidromus sowerbyi Fulton, 1907

= Amphidromus sowerbyi =

Species of gastropod

Amphidromus sowerbyi is a species of air-breathing tree snail, an arboreal gastropod mollusk in the family Camaenidae.

== Description ==
Amphidromus sowerbyi is large, with a shell length ranging from 31 mm (1.2 in) and a diameter of 17 mm (0.67 in).

(Original description) The sinistral shell is thin, with a nearly occluded umbilicus. The protoconch is dull white with a brown apical spot. The teleoconch is yellow on the lower whorls, bearing six narrow dark brown spiral bands on the median whorls, and the body whorl exhibiting two broader bands anteriorly: one immediately below the periphery and the other slightly more ventral. The umbilical region is yellow and is finely obliquely striated. The shell contains approximately 6.25 moderately convex whorls, increasing rather slowly. The aperture is translucent, revealing the external banding. The waxy peristome is very narrowly expanded. The columella is vertical and is narrowly expanded at its insertion.

== Distribution ==
Amphidromus sowerbyi was found on Nias Island, off the werst coast of Sumatra.
