= Scopula eulomata =

Scientific classification
- Kingdom: Animalia
- Phylum: Arthropoda
- Class: Insecta
- Order: Lepidoptera
- Family: Geometridae
- Genus: Scopula
- Species: S. eulomata

Binomial name
- Scopula eulomata (Snellen, 1877)

Synonyms
- Acidalia eulomata Snellen, 1877; Craspedia compressaria Warren, 1900

Species of geometer moth in subfamily Sterrhinae

Scopula eulomata is a moth of the family Geometridae. It is found on Java, Bali, Sumatra, Nias and Japan.
