= Nias Expedition =

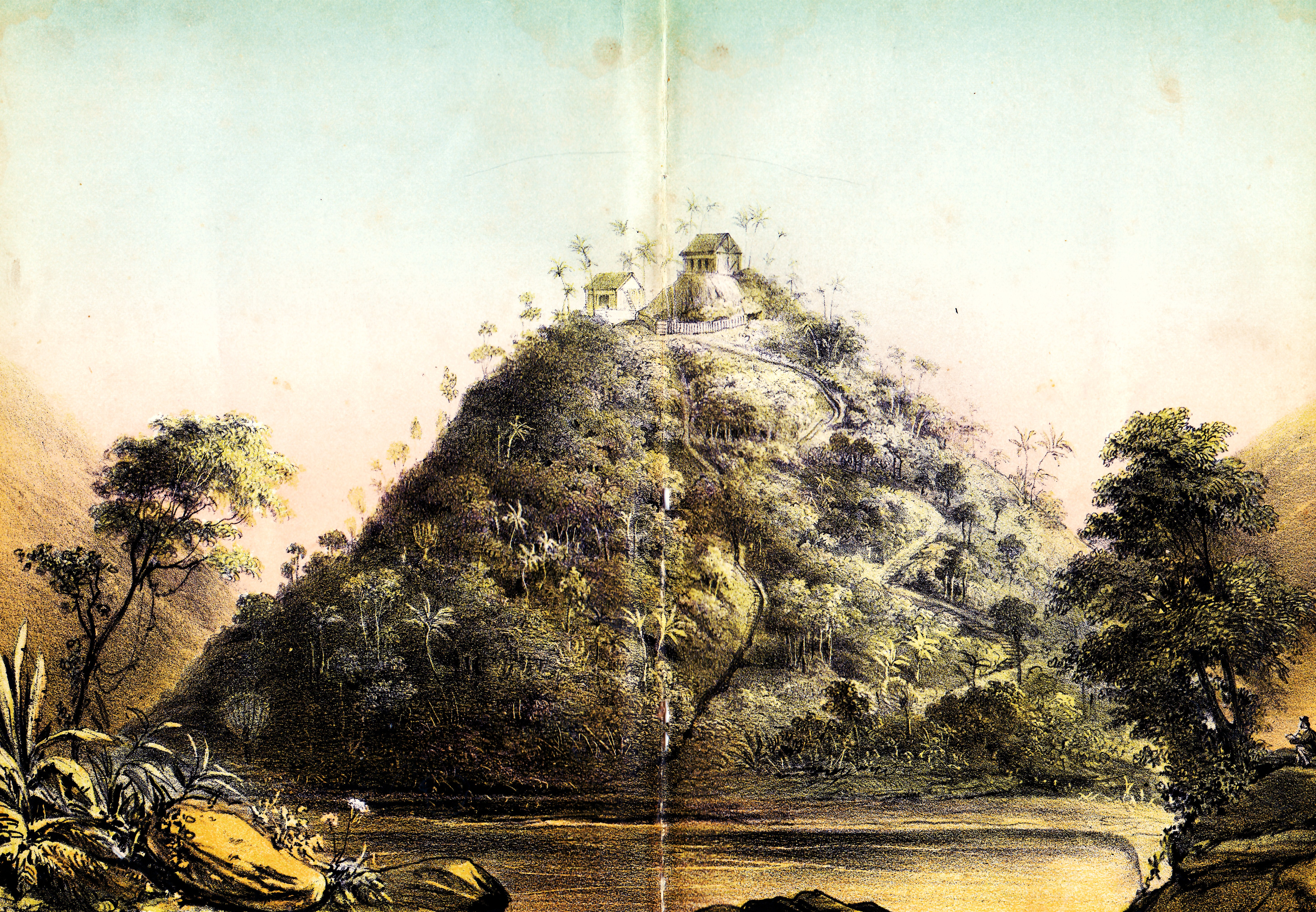
Leulawaoe op Nias

The Nias Expedition was a punitive expedition of the Royal Netherlands East Indies Army to Nias at the end of 1855, which, with intervals, lasted until 1864.

== Background ==
Nias (Nias Island) was an almost isolated island. The distance of Nias Island from the mainland Sumatera made Nias Island become almost isolated from Srivijaya and Majapahit. But, Nias people and their activity were noted well by Fansur (Barus) and Sibolga residents during their trade. Nias island was officially part of Fansur (Barus) in the tenth century (as it might have been earlier).

Their relationship was still good until the 17th century. This statement is accurate according to Vereenigde Oostindische Compagnie's notes. In 1672, Vereenigde Oostindische Compagnie was being given a permission by Barus to do trade transaction in Barus harbour, Singkil (1693), and Nias Island (1694).

At the end of 1855, The Nias Expedition was launched by Netherlands to expand their territory to plant spices on land and to build harbors at the beach. Occupying Nias would make it easier for the Netherlands to control the trade route at west coast of Sumatra. If spices grew well, the Dutch East Indies would be able to build a twinning harbor city like Sibolga or Barus.

== Sources ==
- 1900. W.A. Terwogt. Het land van Jan Pieterszoon Coen. Geschiedenis van de Nederlanders in oost-Indië. P. Geerts. Hoorn
- 1900. G. Kepper. Wapenfeiten van het Nederlands Indische Leger; 1816–1900. M.M. Cuvee, Den Haag.'
- 1876. A.J.A. Gerlach. Nederlandse heldenfeiten in Oost Indë. Drie delen. Gebroeders Belinfante, Den Haag.
- 1866. Willem Adriaan van Rees. De pioniers der beschaving in Nederlands Indië. Verhaal van enige krijgstochten op de buitenbezittingen. D.A. Thieme. Den Haag.
- 1907. Corpus Diplomaticum, vol 4, pp 25–54.
