= Baluse =

Traditional shield of Indonesia

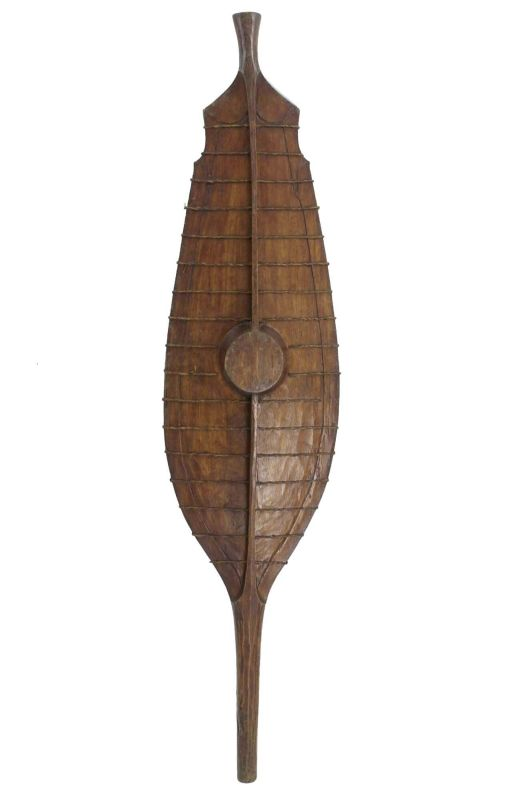
- A Baluse shield, pre-1942.
- Type: Shield
- Place of origin: Nias, Indonesia

Service history
- Used by: Nias people

Specifications
- Width: 27 cm (11 in)
- Height: 120 cm (47 in)

Baluse or Baloese is a traditional shield of the Nias people originating from Nias, an island off the west coast of North Sumatra, Indonesia. Baluse in the Northern Nias is somewhat smaller than those of the rest of the island.

== Description ==
The shield is made of wood shaped like banana leaves and is held on the left hand which serves to deflect enemy attacks. The surface of the shield is carved with rib-cage patterns from top to bottom. There is a round knob at the centre of the shield, and the shield's handle is directly behind this knob.

== Culture ==
The Baluse is used with the Balato (sword) or the Burusa (spear) during traditional war dances such as Faluaya (or Fataele) and Maena Baluse.

== See also ==
- Klebit Bok
- Kanta (shield)
