= Gari (sword) =

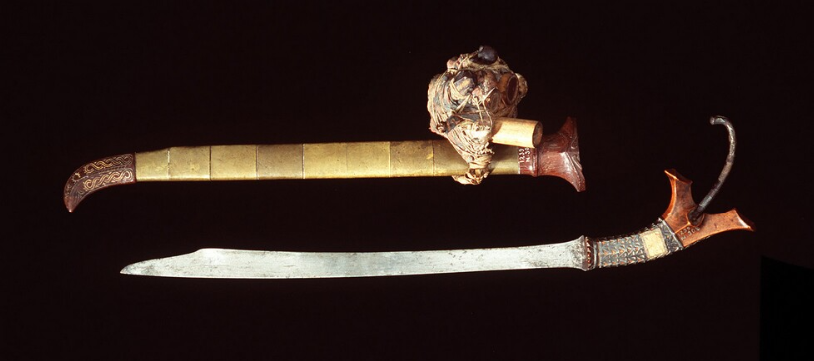
- A Gari sword, 1899.
- Type: Sword
- Place of origin: Indonesia (Nias)

Service history
- Used by: Nias people (Ono Niha)

Specifications
- Length: 58 cm (23 in) approximately
- Blade type: Single edge, hollow grind
- Hilt type: Wood, horn
- Scabbard/sheath: Wood

Gari is a sword that originates from Nias, an island off the west coast of North Sumatra, Indonesia. It is a term used for a type of sword found only in North Nias.

== Description ==
It is a sword with narrow blade, slightly curved at the end. The hilt has the shape of a lasara's head and a long curved iron protrusion ("tongue"), appearing from the centre of the opened mouth. The scabbard is, as is the blade, slightly curved at the end. It may be decorated with brass strips and wood-carvings. Magical objects may be attached to the scabbard's top.

== Culture ==
The Gari is used during wedding ceremonies in Northern Nias. The couple will stand with the priest beneath the ancestor figures, with all three grasping the Gari while the priest chants a prayer. The Gari is also used a part of the presentation of dowry to the bride's father.

== See also ==
- Balato (sword)
- Si Euli
