= Lasara =

- Village
- Location in Punjab, India Lasara (India)
- Coordinates: 31.0332715°N 75.9302687°E
- Country: India
- State: Punjab
- District: Jalandhar
- Tehsil: Phillaur

Government
  - Type: Panchayat raj
  - Body: Gram panchayat
- Elevation: 246 m (807 ft)

Population (2011)
  - Total: 4,502
- Sex ratio 2284/2218 ♂/♀

Languages
  - Official: Punjabi
- Time zone: UTC+5:30 (IST)
- Telephone code: 01826
- ISO 3166 code: IN-PB
- Vehicle registration: PB 37
- Website: jalandhar.nic.in

Lasara is a village in Phillaur tehsil of Jalandhar District of Punjab State, India. It is located 17 km away from Phillaur, 60 km from Jalandhar and 108 km from state capital Chandigarh. The village is administrated by a Sarpanch, an elected representative of the village.

== Demographics ==
As of 2011, the village has a population size of 4502. The village has schedule caste (SC) constitutes 26.70% of total population of the village and it does not have any Schedule Tribe (ST) population.

== Education ==
The village has a co-ed upper Primary with secondary/higher secondary school which was founded in 1965. It provides a mid-day meal as per the Indian Midday Meal Scheme.

== Transport ==
=== Rail ===
Phillaur Junction is the nearest train station which is 17 km away from the village; however, Bhattian Railway Station is 20 km away from the village.

=== Air ===
The nearest domestic airport is located 42.4 km away in Ludhiana and the nearest international airport is located in Chandigarh. The second nearest international airport is 155 km away in Amritsar.
