= Batu Islands =

Archipelago in North Sumatra, Indonesia

Coordinates: 0°12′S 98°30′E

Map of Batu Islands.

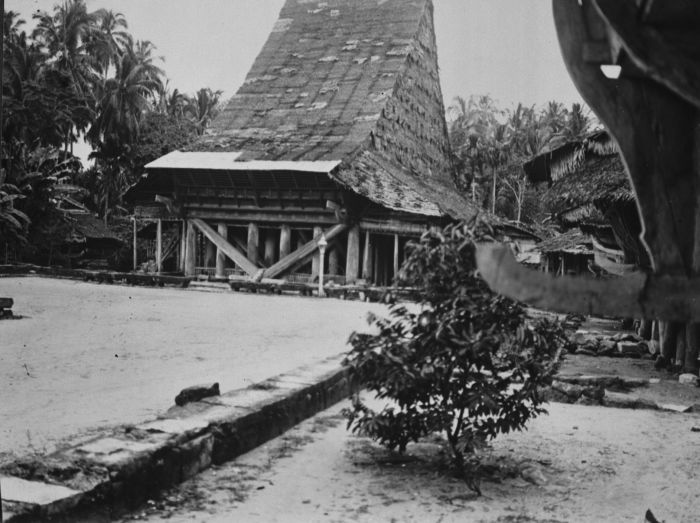
A council house in Baruyu Lasara, Tello island (1922)

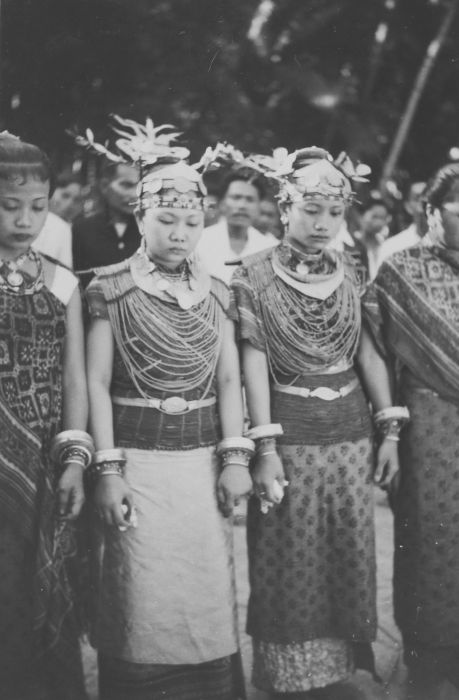
Bride in the Batu Islands (1938)

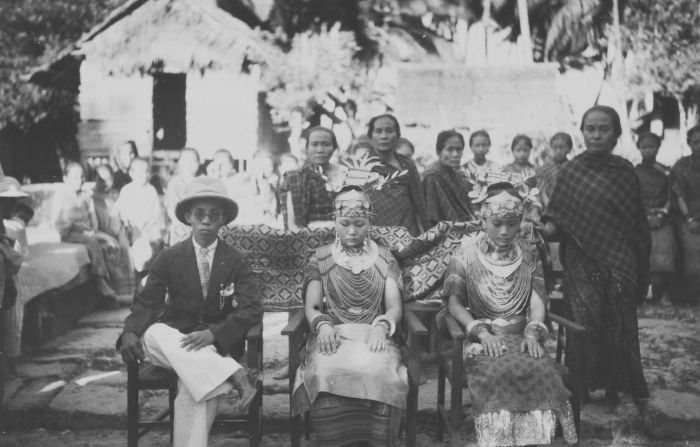
Wedding in the Batu Islands (1938)

The Batu Islands (Batu means "stone" in Indonesian) are an archipelago of Indonesia located in the Indian Ocean, off the west coast of Sumatra, between Nias and Siberut. The three primary islands, of approximately equal size, are Pini, Tanahmasa, and Tanahbala. There are seventy-five smaller islands, of which the largest are Sipika, Tello and Sigata (all off the west coast of Tanahmasa), Simuk (considerably further to the west) and Bojo (to the south of Tanahbala); less than half are inhabited. The total land area of the seven administrative districts is 1,201.1 km^{2} and the total population was officially estimated at 35,168 as at mid 2024, and projected to rise to 35,547 at mid 2025. The islands are governed as a part of South Nias regency within North Sumatra province. In Indonesian and Malay, batu means rock or stone.

The equator passes through the archipelago, north of Tanahmasa and south of Pini. Administratively, Pini (with offshore islets) forms the Pulau Pulau Batu Timur (East Batu Islands) District of South Nias Regency. The rest of the archipelago at the 2010 Census formerly comprised the Pulau Pulau Batu (Batu Islands) and Hibala Districts of the same regency; however, both have been subsequently divided to form new Districts - Tanahmasa District has been formed from part of Hibala District, and three new districts have been formed from parts of Pulau Pulau Batu District - namely Pulau Pulau Batu Barat (West Batu Islands), Pulau Pulau Batu Utara (North Batu Islands, which lie to the north of Tanamasa) and Simuk Districts. The original districts remain with reduced areas and population, and thus the islands now form seven separate districts.

Name	Area in km^{2}	Pop'n Census 2010	Pop'n Census 2020	Pop'n Estimate mid 2024	Admin centre (with location)	Number of villages	Post code
Hibala ^{(a)}	225.75	9,620	7,716	8,417	Eho (on Tanabala Island)	17	22881
Tanahmasa	451.43	^{(b)}	4,807	5,244	Baluta (on Tanamasa Island)	12	22887
Pulau Pulau Batu ^{(c)} (Batu Islands)	105.09	16,365	9,731	9,902	Pasar Pulau Tello (on Tello Island)	22	22882
Pulau Pulau Batu Timur (East Batu Islands)	372.05	2,483	3,091	3,313	Labuhan Hiu (on Pini Island)	10	22884
Simuk (island)	20.42	^{(d)}	1,934	1,968	Gobo (on Simuk Island)	6	22886
Pulau Pulau Batu Barat ^{(e)} (West Batu Islands)	21.06	^{(d)}	2,320	2,361	Bawositora (on Sigata Island)	9	22883
Pulau Pulau Batu Utara ^{(f)} (North Batu Islands)	6.30	^{(d)}	3,894	3,963	Silima Banua Marit (on Marit Island)	12	22885
Totals for Kepulauan Batu	1,201.10	28,468	33,493	35,168		88	

Notes: (a) Hibala District now comprises 42 islands, chiefly Tanahbala Island but including Bojo Island to its south.
(b) The 2010 population of Tanah Masa District (comprising that part of Tanahmasa Island previously part of Hibala District) is included in the 2010 population of Hibala District.
(c) Pulau Pulau Batu District now includes various small islands, including Tello, Batumakele and Sibele.
(d) The 2010 populations of Simuk District (Simuk Island), Pulau Pulau Batu Barat District and Pulau Pulau Batu Utara District are included in the 2010 population of Pulau Pulau Batu District.
(e) comprises numerous small islands including Sigata, Sipika, Pono, Sibaranu, Hayo and Bintuang.
(f) comprises numerous small islands including Marit, Lorang, Memong and Lorang.

The four new districts in the Batu Islands are Pulau Pulau Batu Barat (West Batu Islands), Pulau Pulau Batu Utara (North Batu Islands), Simuk (Simuk Island) and Tanah Masa (that part of Tanahmasa Island previously part of Hibala District).

== People ==
A man speaking Li Niha, the language of the Batu Islands.

The people of the Batu Islands have had substantial interaction with the populations of Nias, to the north, whose language they share. The islands have occasionally been a destination for slaves who escaped from Nias, and in the past decade have become a destination for surfing boat charters from Padang, on the Sumatran mainland. The population at the 2010 Census was 28,468.

The islands were visited by Simon Reeve during Equator, a 2006 BBC TV Series.

== Wildlife ==
A population of the Sunda clouded leopard had been recorded here.

== See also ==
- Sunda Islands
