= Terabai =

Traditional wooden shield

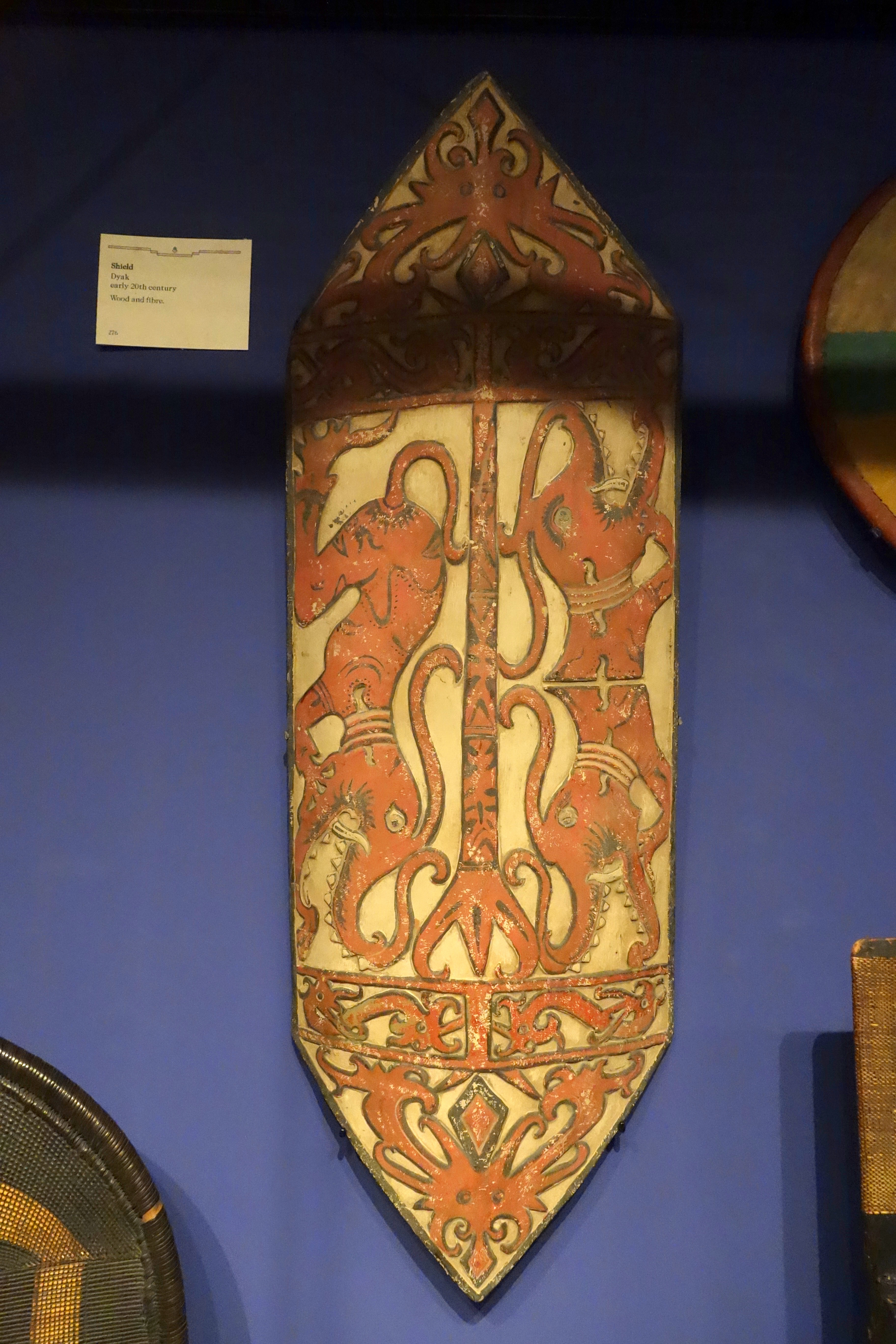
- Terabai (early 20th century) on display at the Glenbow Museum, Canada
- Type: Shield
- Place of origin: Borneo

Service history
- Used by: Iban people

Terabai (or trabai) is a traditional wooden shield historically used during engagements by the Iban Dayak tribe of Borneo.

== Form and structure ==
Terabai was traditionally made with highly-durable wood such as ironwood and teras. The patterns carved onto the terabai are inspired by deities of Dayak mythology, and is believed to give warriors spiritual strength during engagements, in addition to scare off enemies. The motives were not randomly designated; it can historically only be carved based on divine (petara) inspiration. One example motive is the leech (lemetak), which was believed to incite fear due to its disgusting nature and difficult to be eliminated based on its small size.

== Usage ==
Terabai was historically used by tribal warriors for personal protection in engagements, especially during headhunting (ngayau). In modern times, as such clashes are no longer practiced, the usage of terabai is now limited to cultural expressions, including ngajat and welcoming ceremonies.
