= Zega =

Zega or Zegas is a surname. Notable people with the surname include:

- Aleksandar Zega (1860–1928), Serbian chemist
- Andrew Zega (born 1961), American artist, architectural historian, and writer
- Oliviero Zega (1924–2012), Italian footballer
- Alan Zegas (born 1952), American attorney
