= Omo sebua =

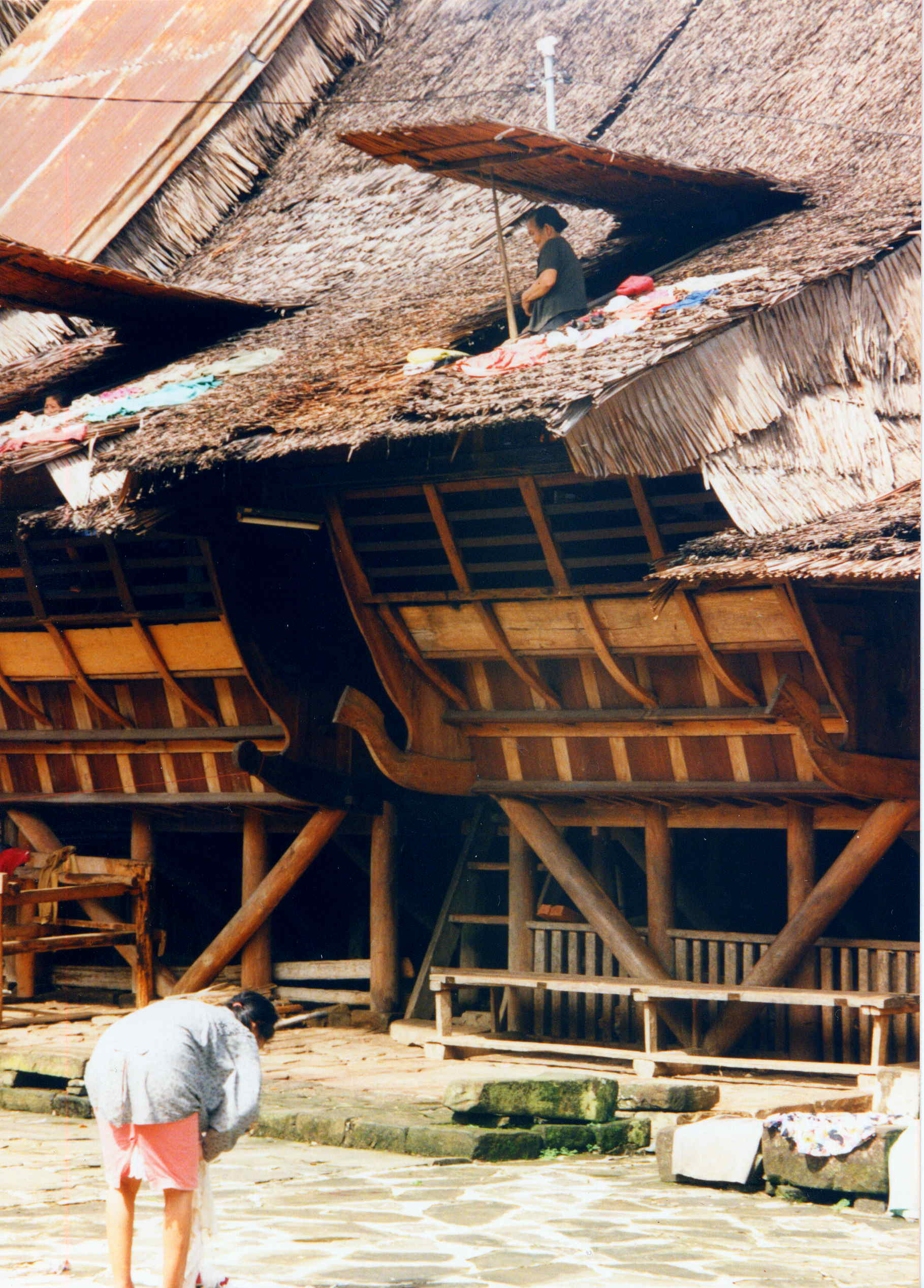
Traditional house in Nias.

The Omo sebua is a traditional house style of the Nias people from Nias island, Indonesia. They are built only for the houses of the village's chiefs. Situated in the centre of a village, omo sebuas are built on massive ironwood piles and have towering roofs. Nias culture, with its frequent inter-village warfare, has made the design of omo sebua impregnable to attack. The houses' sole access is through a narrow staircase with a small trap door above. The steeply pitched roofs can reach 16 metres (50 feet) in height. Apart from a strong defence against enemies, omo sebua has proven earthquake resistance.

== Background ==
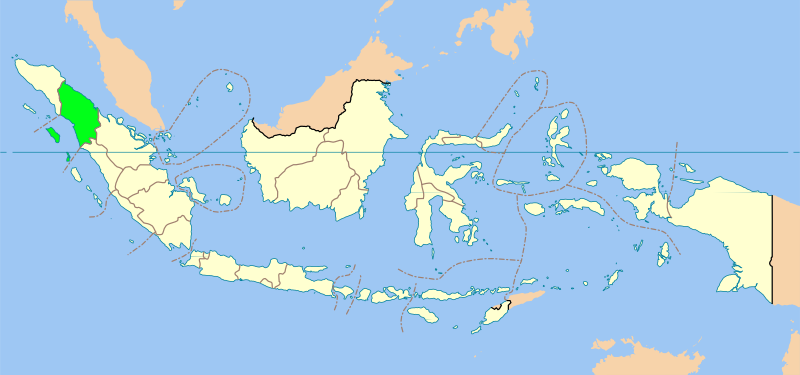
Location of North Sumatra, location of the island of Nias.

Nias (Indonesian: Pulau Nias, Nias language: Tanö Niha) is a rugged island 140 km off the mainland port of Sibolga at the western coast of Sumatra, separated by the Mentawai Strait. Nias is part of the North Sumatra province with Gunungsitoli as its administrative center. The island covers an area of 4,771 km^{2}; the largest of its 131 chain of islands parallel to the Sumatran coast. The population of the island is 639,675 people including Malay, Batak, Chinese) and the indigenous inhabitants Ono Niha.

Once a megalithic head-hunting society, its economy was based on agriculture and pig-rearing, and was supplemented by export of captured slaves in inter-village warfare. Although its isolation has contributed to the uniqueness of its culture, the Nias Island chain has been trading with other cultures, other islands, and even mainland Asia since prehistoric time. The predominant religion is Protestant Christianity with over 75% of the population; the remaining are about evenly divided Muslim (mostly immigrants from elsewhere in Indonesia) and Catholic. However adherence to either Christian or Muslim religions is still largely nominal; Nias continues to celebrate its own indigenous culture and traditions as the primary form of spiritual expression.

Niassan society is highly stratified and chiefs, particularly in the south of island, had access to a wealth of material resources and human labor. It was with this wealth that the early twentieth century saw the chiefs of the isolated island build themselves the grand omo sebua.

== Villages ==
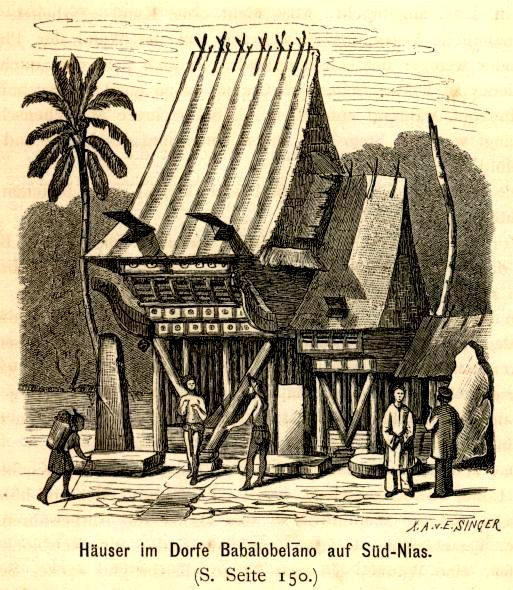
A traditional house in South Nias.

Villages in the island's south are laid out either in a single long cobblestone street or to a cruciform plan with the chief's house at one overlooking the street. They can be large with up to 5,000 residents. Villages were built with defence in mind, strategically sited on high ground and are reached by steep stone stairways and are surrounded by stone walls. Smaller villages, however, would not have been defendable in former slave-trading days. In contrast with houses of northern Nias, which are free-standing, oval in shape and built on piles, southern Nias houses are built in terraces forming long rows.

== Buildings ==
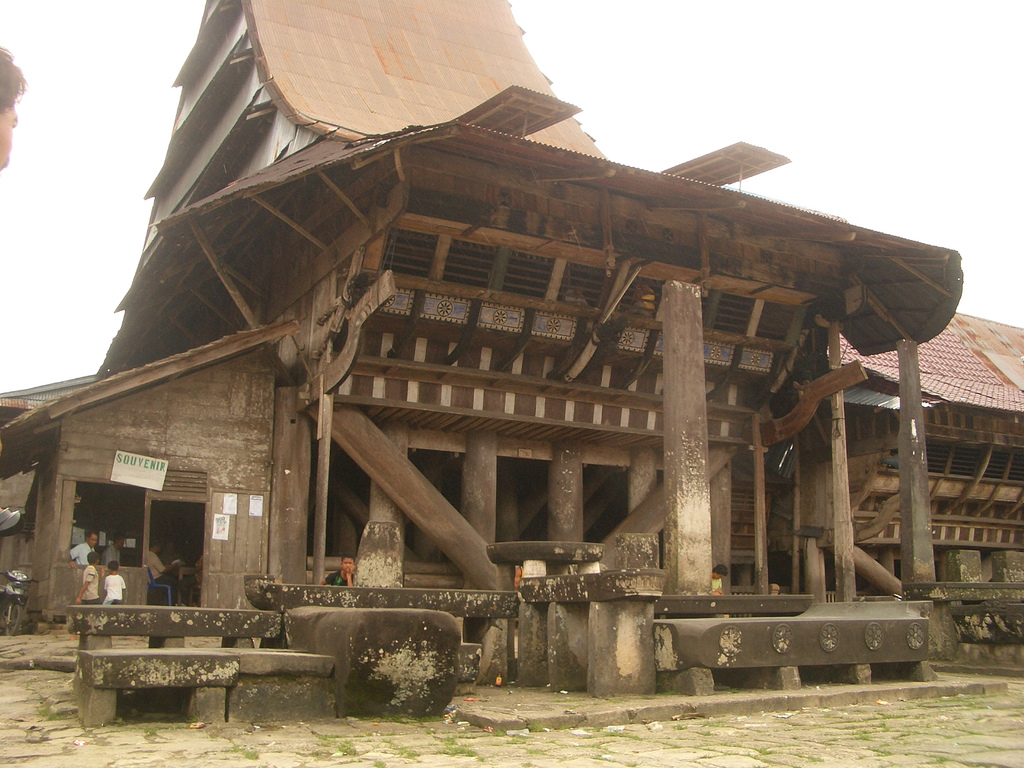
Omo sebua.

Omo sebua, or chief's houses, are situated in the centre of the village and are built on massive ironwood piles and have towering roofs. The piles rest on large stone slabs and diagonal beams of the similar dimension and material providing longitudinal and lateral bracing, enhancing flexibility and stability in earthquakes. The warring culture built them to intimidate with size and the houses are virtually impregnable to attack with only a small trap door above a narrow staircase for access. The steeply pitched roofs reach heights of 16 metres (50 feet); gables project dramatically at both the front and rear, providing both shade and shelter from tropical rains, and giving the building a hooded, towering appearance. With structural members slotted together rather than nailed or bound, the structures have a proven earthquake resistance.

Like the omo sebua, commoners' homes are rectangular in plan. As a defensive measure, interconnecting doors link each house, allowing villagers to walk the full length of the terrace without setting foot on the street below. Both the commoners' houses and the aristocracy's omo sebua have bowed galleries underneath the large overhanging eaves. Presumed to have been inspired by the bulbous sterns of Dutch galleons, they provided a defensive vantage point, and in times of peace, a ventilated and comfortable place from which to observe the street below.

The interiors are built from planed and polished hardwood boards - often ebony - that are slotted into each other using tongue and groove joinery. The internal timbers often feature bas-relief carvings of ancestors, jewelry, animals, fish and boats with a balance of male and female elements that is essential for Niassan concepts of cosmic harmony. The more opulent houses are further decorated with freestanding wooden carvings and the internally exposed rafters are adorned with jaw bones from pigs that were sacrificed for the workers' feast at the time of the houses' completion.

== 2005 Earthquake damage ==
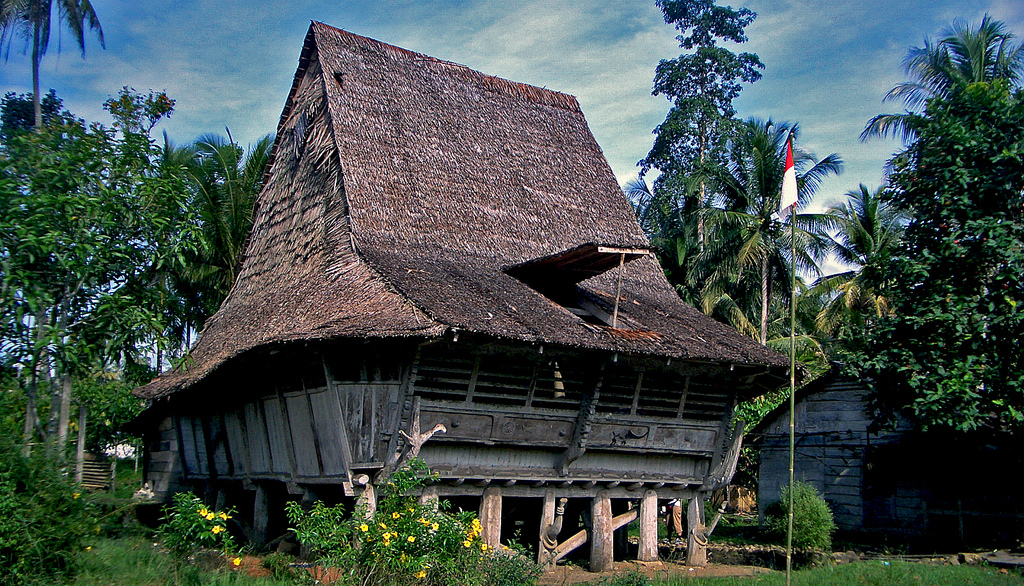
Another Omo sebua in Gomo, Nias.

The December 2004 Indian Ocean earthquake and tsunami caused (only) coastal damage to Nias, but the March 2005 Nias earthquake had a devastating effect on the island. More than 80% of modern public buildings were destroyed. Traditional homes were more earthquake-resistant and most survived.

Reconstruction efforts were hampered by the death of many traditional craftsmen, and the fact that NGOs lacked knowledge of Niasian building methods. The cost of repairing damaged traditional homes was estimated to be similar to building new ones, because collapsing support pillars meant that the house had to be dismantled and reconstructed.

NGO house designs were typically smaller than traditional ones, and lacked many elements that were fundamental to Nias' culture.

== See also ==
- Architecture of Indonesia
- Architecture of Sumatra
