= South Nias Regency =

Regency in North Sumatra, Indonesia

Coordinates: 0.7700°N 97.7500°E

South Nias Regency Kabupaten Nias Selatan
- Regency
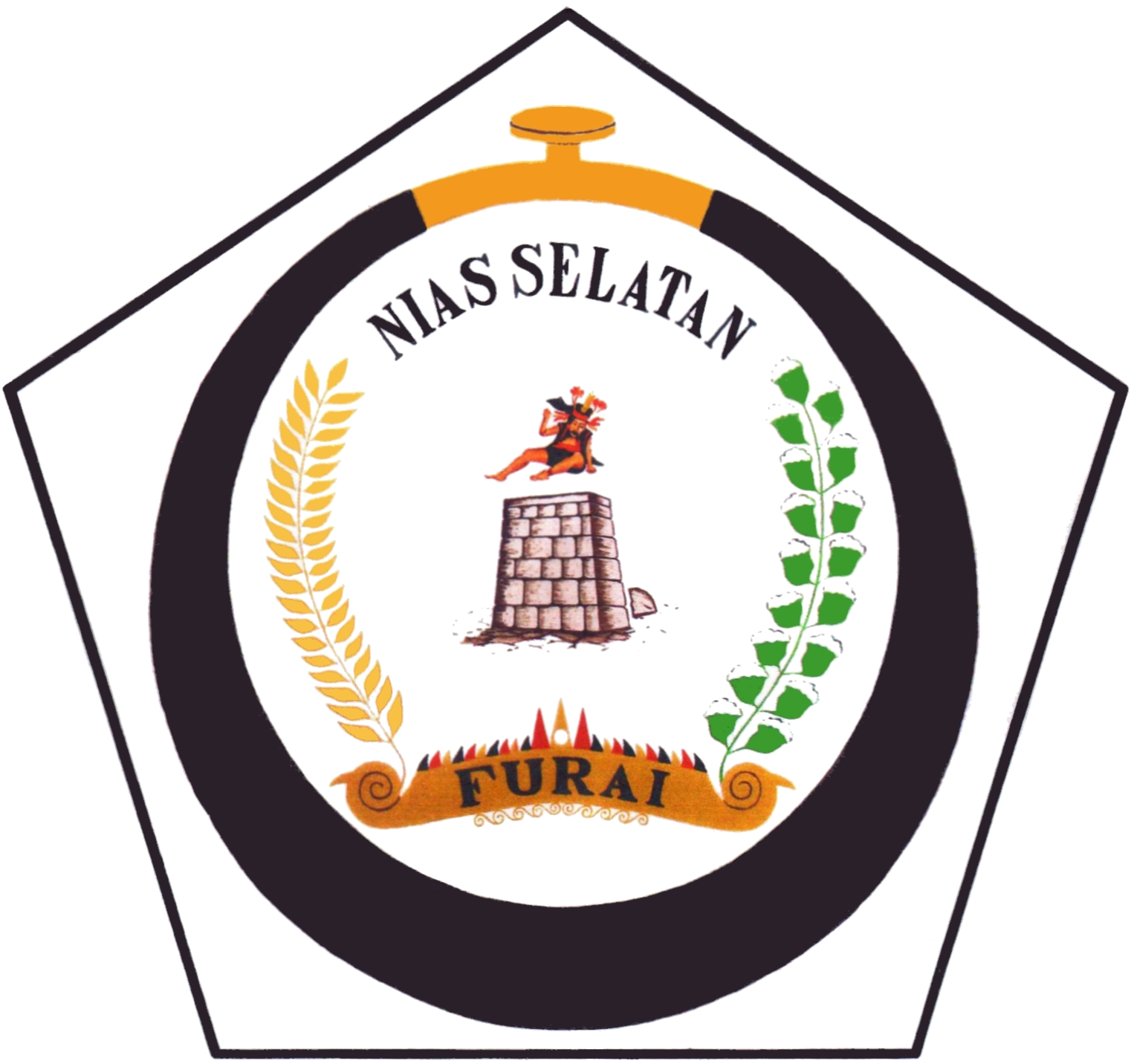
- Seal
- Motto: Furai ("Preserve")
- Country: Indonesia
- Province: Sumatera Utara
- Regency seat: Teluk Dalam

Government
  - Regent: Sokhiatulö Laia
  - Vice Regent: Yusuf Nache
  - Chairman of Council of Representatives: Elisati Halawa (PDI-P)
  - Vice Chairmen of Council of Representatives: Fa'atulö Sarumaha (Nasdem) and Agustana Ndruru (Golkar)

Area
  - Total: 2,487.99 km^{2} (960.62 sq mi)

Population (mid 2024 estimate)
  - Total: 389,957
  - Density: 156.736/km^{2} (405.944/sq mi)
- Time zone: UTC+7 (WIB)
- Website: niasselatankab.go.id

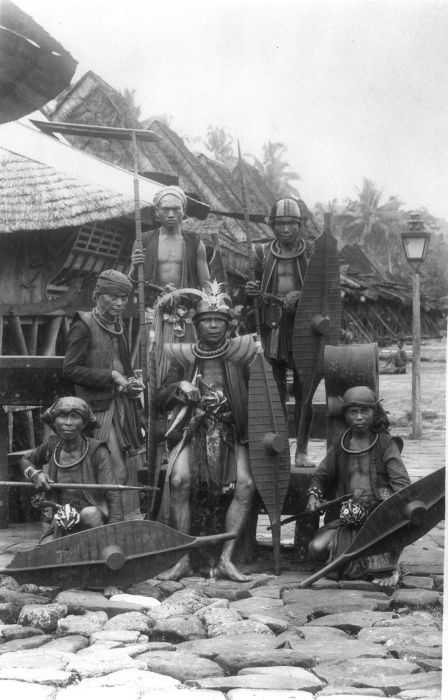
Group of warriors in South Nias. Photo by Christiaan Benjamin Nieuwenhuis

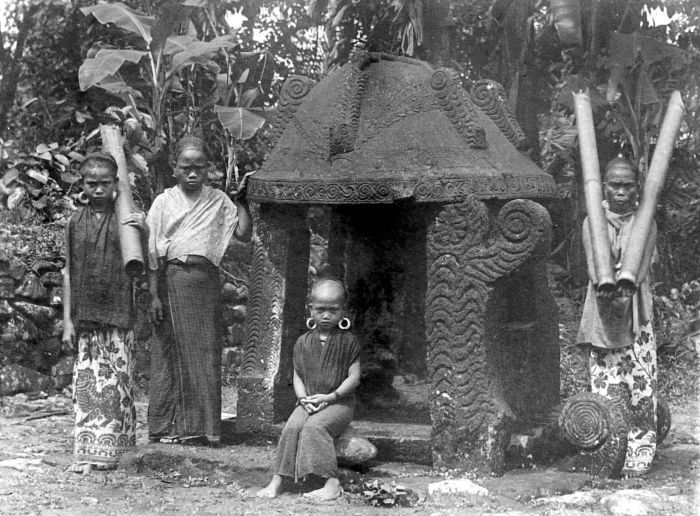
Girls at an offering house at the entrance of a kampong in South Nias

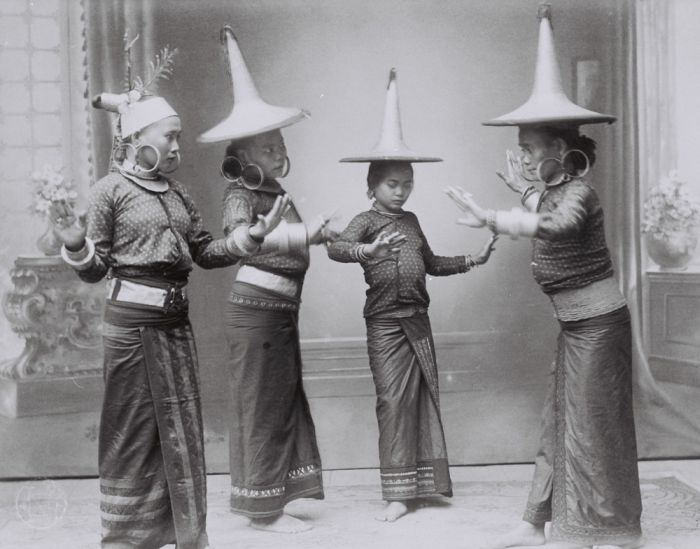
Female dancers

Nias Selatan (South Nias) Regency is a regency in North Sumatra province, Indonesia, created on 25 February 2003 by the division of the existing Nias Regency. The regency covers a land area of 2,487.99 square kilometres and according to the 2010 census had a population of 289,708; the 2020 Census showed a population of 360,531, while the official estimate for mid 2024 was 389,957 and the total projected for mid 2025 was 397,224. Its administrative centre is the port of Teluk Dalam. Apart from the southern portion of Nias Island, the regency also includes the smaller Batu Islands (Pulau Pulau Batu) to the south, lying between Nias and Siberut; these islands occupy nearly half of the land area of the Regency, but have just 9% of its population.

== Administrative districts ==
The regency was divided into eighteen districts (kecamatan) at the time of the 2010 Census, However, since 2010 seventeen additional districts have been created from parts of existing districts, notably in the Batu Islands where there are now seven districts compared with the three in 2010, but also on Nias Island itself where there are now twenty-eight districts within the Regency compared with fifteen in 2010. These are all tabulated below with their areas (in km^{2}) and their populations at the 2010 Census, and the 2020 Census, together with the official estimates as at mid 2024 and the official projected figures for mid 2025. They are grouped geographically (these groupings have no administrative significance). The table also includes the locations of the district administrative centres, the number of administrative villages in each district (a total of 459 classed as rural desa and 2 classed as urban kelurahan), and its postal code.

Kode Wilayah	Name of District (kecamatan)	Area in km^{2}	Pop'n Census 2010	Pop'n Census 2020	Pop'n Estimate mid 2024	Pop'n Projected mid 2025	Admin centre	No. of villages	Post code
12.14.04	Hibala ^{(a)}	225.75	9,620	7,716	8,417	8,588	Eho	17	22881
12.14.31	Tanah Masa	451.43	^{(b)}	4,807	5,244	5,350	Baluta	12	22887
12.14.05	Pulau-Pulau Batu ^{(c)} (Batu Islands)	105.09	16,365	9,731	9,902	9,929	Pasar Pulau Tello ^{(d)} (Tello Island Market)	22	22882
12.14.16	Pulau Pulau Batu Timur (East Batu Islands)	372.05	2,483	3,091	3,313	3,365	Labuhan Hiu	10	22884
12.14.28	Simuk (island)	20.42	^{(e)}	1,934	1,968	1,974	Gobo	6	22886
12.14.29	Pulau Pulau Batu Barat (West Batu Islands)	21.06	^{(e)}	2,320	2,361	2,367	Bawositora	9	22883
12.14.30	Pulau Pulau Batu Utara (North Batu Islands)	6.30	^{(e)}	3,894	3,963	3,974	Silima Banua Marit	12	22885
	Totals for Kepulauan Batu (Batu Islands)	1,201.10	28,468	33,493	35,168	35,547		88	
12.14.06	Teluk Dalam (Deep Bay)	41.30	27,801	25,480	27,103	27,478	Pasar Teluk Dalam ^{(d)}	16	22865
12.14.18	Fanayama	82.49	19,844	18,207	20,656	21,283	Bawo Mataluo	17	22865
12.14.12	Toma	41.26	8,013	13,316	16,003	16,729	Hilisataro	14	22865
12.14.10	Maniamolo	75.32	13,434	13,855	13,780	13,739	Hilisimaetano	14	22865
12.14.13	Mazino	39.49	8,274	8,735	8,769	8,763	Hilizalo'otano	11	22865
12.14.32	Luahagundre Maniamolo	50.39	^{(f)}	10,307	11,692	12,047	Botohili Silambo	10	22868
12.14.33	Onolalu	25.37	^{(f)}	8,474	9,012	9,136	Siholi	10	22869
12.14.07	Amandraya	76.76	17,099	14,059	15,989	16,485	Tuindrao	21	22866
12.14.15	Aramo	63.49	7,762	9,977	10,829	11,035	Hiliorudua	18	22866
12.14.24	Ulususua	57.18	^{(f)}	10,667	12,132	12,508	Fondrakoraya	12	22866
	Totals for Nias Selatan Pusat (Central South Nias)	553.05	102,227	133,077	145,965	149,203		143	
12.14.03	Lahusa	80.36	34,915	20,858	22,923	23,432	Bawo Otalua	23	22874
12.14.25	Sidua'ori	62.40	^{(f)}	11,354	12,478	12,755	Hilidohona	11	22874
12.14.26	Somambawa	40.63	^{(f)}	14,102	15,499	15,844	Sihareo	14	22874
12.14.02	Gomo	37.56	25,078	10,544	11,867	12,203	Orahili Gomo	11	22873
12.14.09	Susua	28.23	14,966	16,811	17,297	17,392	Sifalago Susua	18	22873
12.14.17	Mazo	29.03	15,129	12,674	12,452	12,377	Tetegawaai	10	22873
12.14.14	Umbunasi	32.81	7,840	7,583	7,450	7,405	Lawindra	11	22873
12.14.35	Idanotae	28.31	^{(f)}	10,102	11,369	11,691	Hilimbowo Idanotae	12	22878
12.14.34	Ulu Idanotae	14.33	^{(f)}	7,185	8,086	8,314	Fanedanu	11	22877
12.14.27	Boronadu	29.33	^{(f)}	7,483	8,421	8,659	Sifalago Gomo	10	22873
	Totals for Nias Tenggara (Southeast Nias)	382.99	97,928	118,696	127,842	130,072		131	
12.14.01	Lolomatua	21.59	25,198	11,072	12,702	13,124	Hiliotalua	13	22867
12.14.19	Ulunoyo	48.99	^{(f)}	13,035	14,954	15,451	Orahili Ulunoyo	13	22867
12.14.20	Huruna	49.29	^{(f)}	13,135	15,068	15,569	Hilizoliga	17	22867
12.14.08	Lolowa'u	48.03	30,088	9,645	9,601	9,575	Lolowau	14	22864
12.14.11	Hilimegai	40.15	5,799	6,926	7,302	7,387	Togizita	10	22864
12.14.21	O'o'u	73.16	^{(f)}	8,825	8,785	8,761	Simandraolo	11	22864
12.14.22	Onohazumba	28.45	^{(f)}	6,883	6,852	6,833	Orahili Huruna	10	22864
12.14.23	Hilisalawa'ahe	40.19	^{(f)}	5,744	5,718	5,702	Maluo	11	22864
	Totals for Nias Barat Daya (Southwest Nias)	349.84	61,085	75,265	80,982	82,402		99	
	Totals for South Nias	2,487.99	289,708	360,531	389,957	397,224	Teluk Dalam	461	

Notes: (a) Hibala District now comprises 42 islands.
(b) The 2010 population of Tanah Masa District (comprising that part of Tanahmasa Island previously part of Hibala District) is included in the 2010 population of Hibala District.
(c) Pulau Pulau Batu District now comprises 35 islands. (d) There are 2 urban villages (kelurahan) - Pasar Teluk Dalam ("Deep Bay Market") in Teluk Dalam District, and Pasar Pulau Tello ("Tello Island Market") in Pulau Pulau Batu District.
(e) The 2010 populations of Simuk District (Simuk Island), Pulau Pulau Batu Barat District and Pulau Pulau Batu Utara District are included in the 2010 population of Pulau Pulau Batu District.
(f) The 2010 populations of the thirteen new districts on Nias Island are included in the 2010 populations of the districts from which they were split off.

The four new districts in the Batu Islands are Pulau Pulau Batu Barat (West Batu Islands), Pulau Pulau Batu Utara (North Batu Islands), Simuk (Simuk Island) and Tanah Masa (that part of Tanahmasa Island previously part of Hibala District). The thirteen new districts on Nias Island itself are Hilisalawa'ahe, O'o'u, Onohazumba, Ulususua, Ulunoyo, Huruna, Luahagundre Maniomolo, Onolalu, Boronadu, Sidua'ori, Somambawa, Ulu Idanotae, and Idanotae.

== Tourism ==
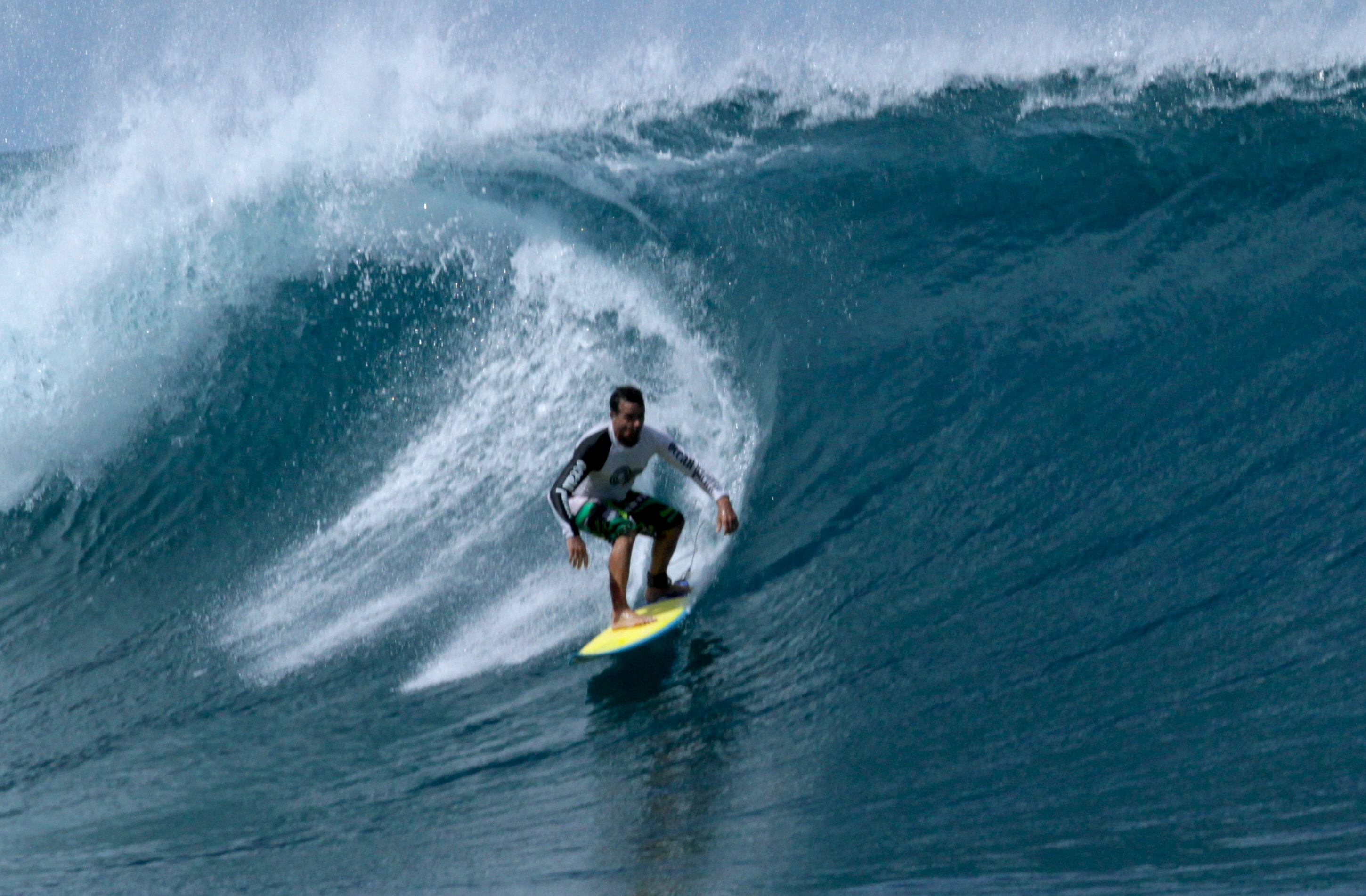
Surfer in South Nias

South Nias Regency is a paradise for surfers with four surfing beaches:

- Sorake Beach (Lagundri Bay) is the second best in the world after Hawaii Beach for surfing. It has five levels of waves which only occurs here. Located in Luahagundre Maniamolo District with a wave height of a maximum 3–4 metres and it depends on the wind.
- Beaches in Pulau Pulau Batu, Pulau Pulau Batu Barat, and Pulau Pulau Batu Utara Districts with wave height maximum 8–9 metres, but have only limited infrastructures.
