= Krai Silai =

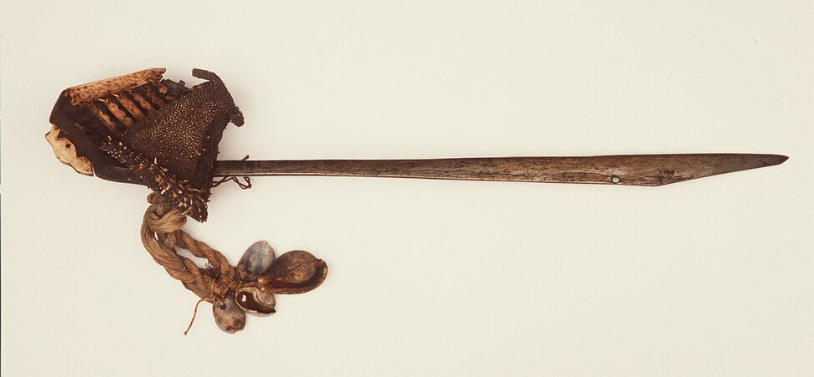
- A Krai Silai sword from Tanimbar Islands
- Type: Sword
- Place of origin: Indonesia (Tanimbar Islands)

Service history
- Used by: Tanimbarese people

Specifications
- Length: approximately 63 cm (25 in) blade
- Blade type: Single edge
- Hilt type: Wood, bone
- Scabbard/sheath: Wood

The Krai Silai (which means "great sword") or simply called Tanimbarese sword, is a sword originating from the Tanimbar Islands, Indonesia. It is also called Lofu in Seram Island.

In the past, the Krai Silai is used in a solemn single combat, in which people stood opposite each other, armed with a Krai Silai and separated by a bamboo fence at chest height. In ordinary circumstances, the old men simply wore their hair wound around their heads, futoe ngwine, held up by a court cloth, moselai, and secured with a comb.

== See also ==
- Belida (sword)
- Hemola
- Moso (sword)
- Rugi (sword)
