= Bara Sangihe =

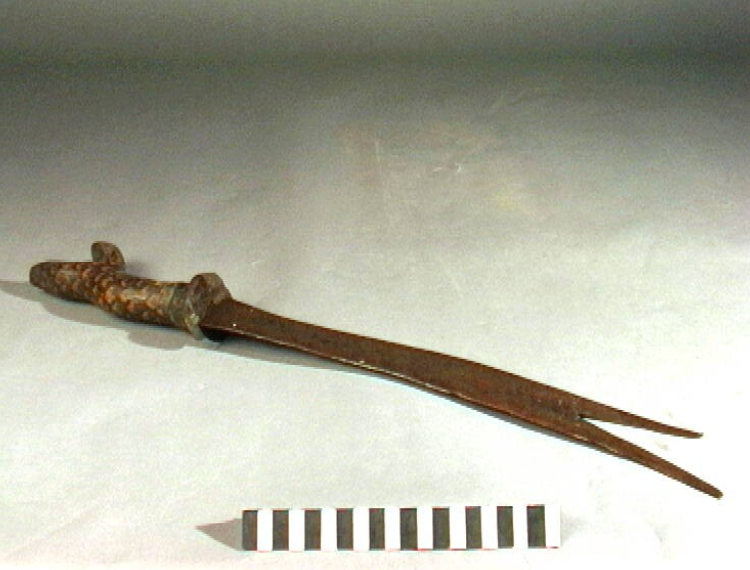
- A Bara Sangihe sword, 1925.
- Type: Sword
- Place of origin: Indonesia (North Sulawesi)

Service history
- Used by: Sangirese people

Specifications
- Length: overall length: approx. 100–150 cm (39–59 in)
- Blade type: Split-tip single edged
- Hilt type: Wood

The Bara Sangihe (or as it is also known locally as Pedang Bara Sangihe) sword originates from North Sulawesi, Indonesia.

== Background ==
The word bara means "sword" in Sangirese language, therefore it literally means "Sangirese sword". The Bara Sangihe is known for its unique shaped blade that resembles a crocodile or a beak of a bird with serrations. The shape of its handle also splits into two, is made of wood, carved with traditional Sangirese motifs. It is also said that the Bara Sangihe is one of the weapons used by a local warrior from North Sulawesi, Hengkeng U Nang, born in 1590.

== See also ==
- Zulfiqar
- Alamang
- Dua Lalan
- Penai (sword)
