= Kukri =

Knife associated with the Gurkhas of Nepal

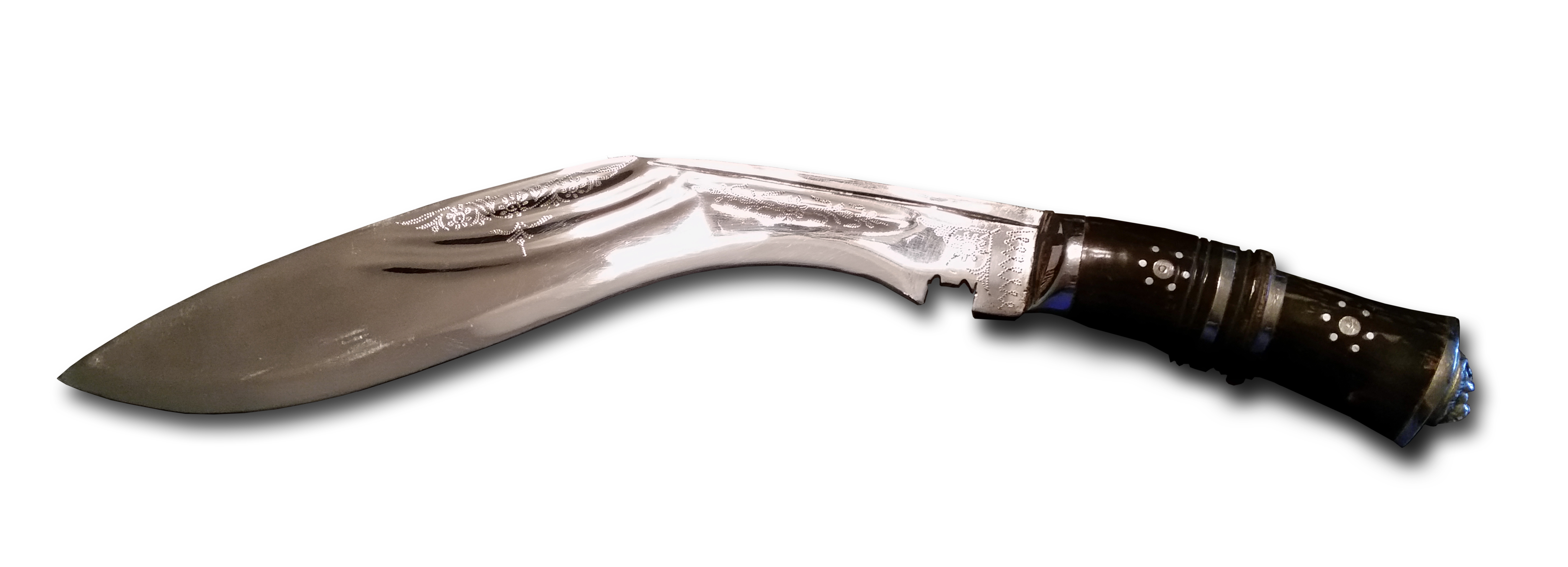
- Type: Bladed melee weapon, utility tool
- Place of origin: Gorkha Kingdom

Service history
- In service: c. 7th century – present
- Used by: Gurkhas, Khas people and Kirats (natively)
- Wars: Gurkha War; Anglo-Afghan Wars; Sino-Nepalese War; Third Nepal–Tibet War; World War I; World War II; 1962 Sino-Indian War; Second Indo-Pakistani War; 1967 Sino-Indian War; Third Indo-Pakistani War; Falklands War; Kargil War; War in Afghanistan (1978–present)

Specifications
- Mass: 450–900 g (1–2 lb)
- Length: 40–45 cm (16–18 in)

The kukri (English: /ˈkʊkri/) or khukuri (Nepali: खुकुरी, pronounced [kʰukuri]) is a type of knife or short sword with a distinct recurve in its blade that originated in the Indian subcontinent. It serves multiple purposes as a melee weapon and also as a regular cutting/chopping tool throughout most of South Asia. The kukri, khukri, and kukkri spellings are of Nepali English origin.

The kukri is the national weapon of Nepal, traditionally serving the role of a basic utility knife for the Nepali-speaking Gurkhas, and consequently is a characteristic weapon of the Nepali Army.

Since the kukri's earliest recorded use in the 7th century, it has accumulated a number of myths—the most persistent being that the blade must draw blood before it can be sheathed, a belief rooted in the misconception that the kukri exists purely as a weapon of war. In reality, the knife's uses extend far beyond combat: Nepalese farmers and laborers rely on it to cut crops and clear brush, hunters use it to skin and dress game, and it doubles as a tool for cooking and woodworking. In certain Nepalese religious traditions, it also carries ceremonial significance.

== History ==
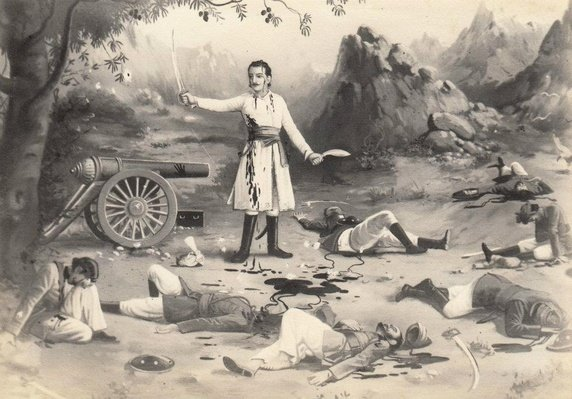
Colonel Gambhir Singh Rayamajhi Kshetri, a Gorkhali Commander armed with a Khukuri in his left hand and Talwar on his right

Researchers trace the origins of the blade back to the domestic sickle and the prehistoric bent stick used for hunting and later in hand-to-hand combat. Similar implements have existed in several forms throughout the Indian subcontinent and were used both as weapons and as tools. It might have derived from the ancient Indian saber called nistrimsa (निस्त्रिंश), itself possibly based on the Greek kopis brought by Alexander the Great's forces to India in the 4th century BC. Burton (1884) writes that the British Museum housed a large kukri-like falchion inscribed with writing in Pali. Among the oldest existing kukri are those belonging to Drabya Shah (c. 1559), housed in the National Museum of Nepal in Kathmandu. This dating has been questioned by some historians with others pointing to 18th Century blades in the Palace Museum of Beijing and the Victoria & Albert Museum of London as the earliest existing examples.

The kukri came to be known to the Western world when the East India Company came into conflict with the growing Gorkha Kingdom, culminating in the Gurkha War of 1814–1816. It gained literary attention in the 1897 novel Dracula by Irish author Bram Stoker. Despite the popular image of Dracula having a stake driven through his heart at the conclusion of a climactic battle between Dracula's bodyguards and the heroes, Mina's narrative describes his throat being sliced through by Jonathan Harker's kukri and his heart pierced by Quincey Morris's Bowie knife.

All Gurkha troops are issued with two kukris, a Service No.1 (ceremonial) and a Service No.2 (exercise); in modern times, members of the Brigade of Gurkhas receive training in its use. The weapon gained fame in the Gurkha War and its continued use through both World War I and World War II enhanced its reputation among both Allied troops and enemy forces. Its acclaim was demonstrated in North Africa by one unit's situation report. It reads: "Enemy losses: ten killed, our nil. Ammunition expenditure nil."

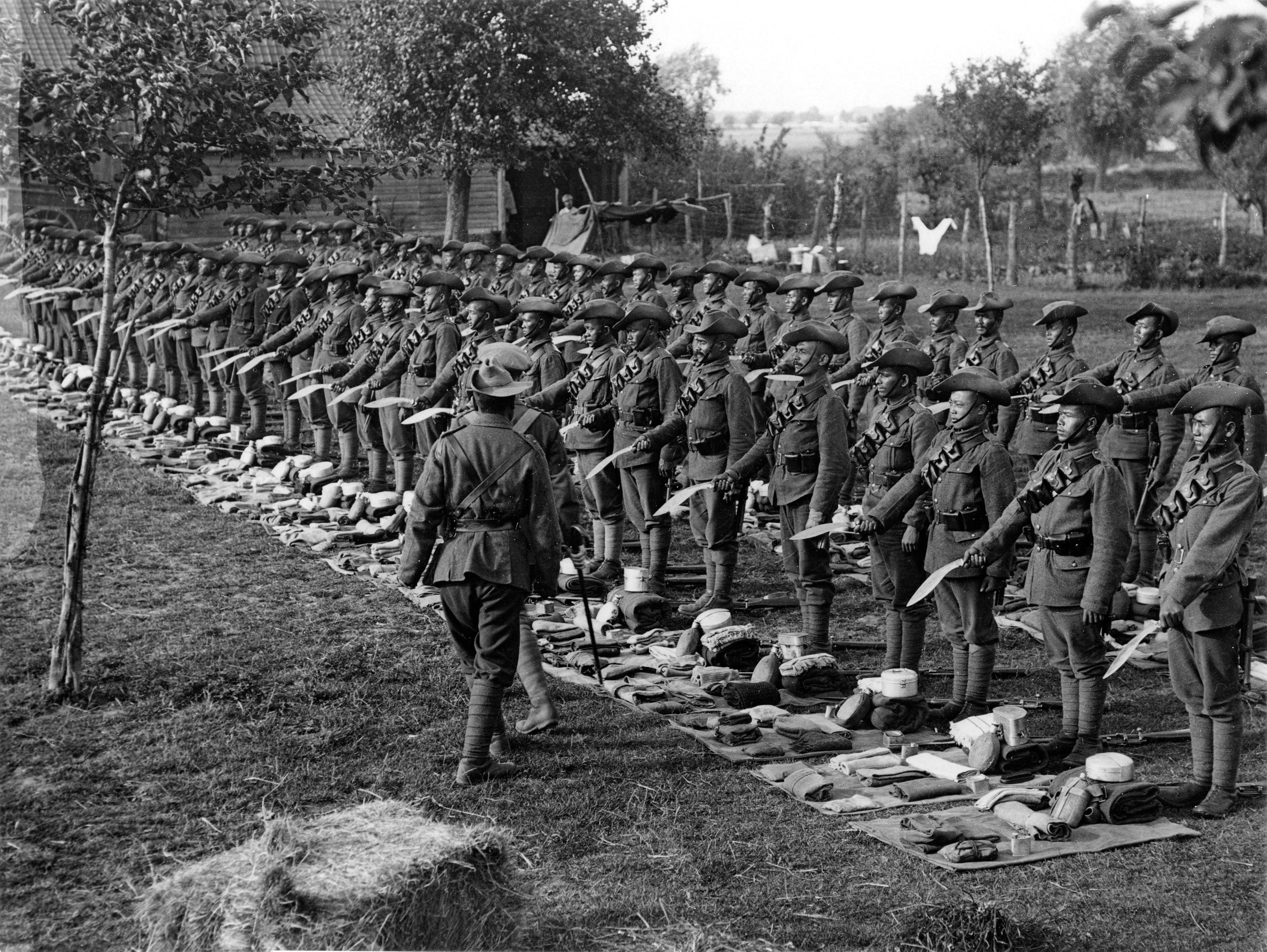
Gurkhas at kit inspection showing kukri in France during World War I

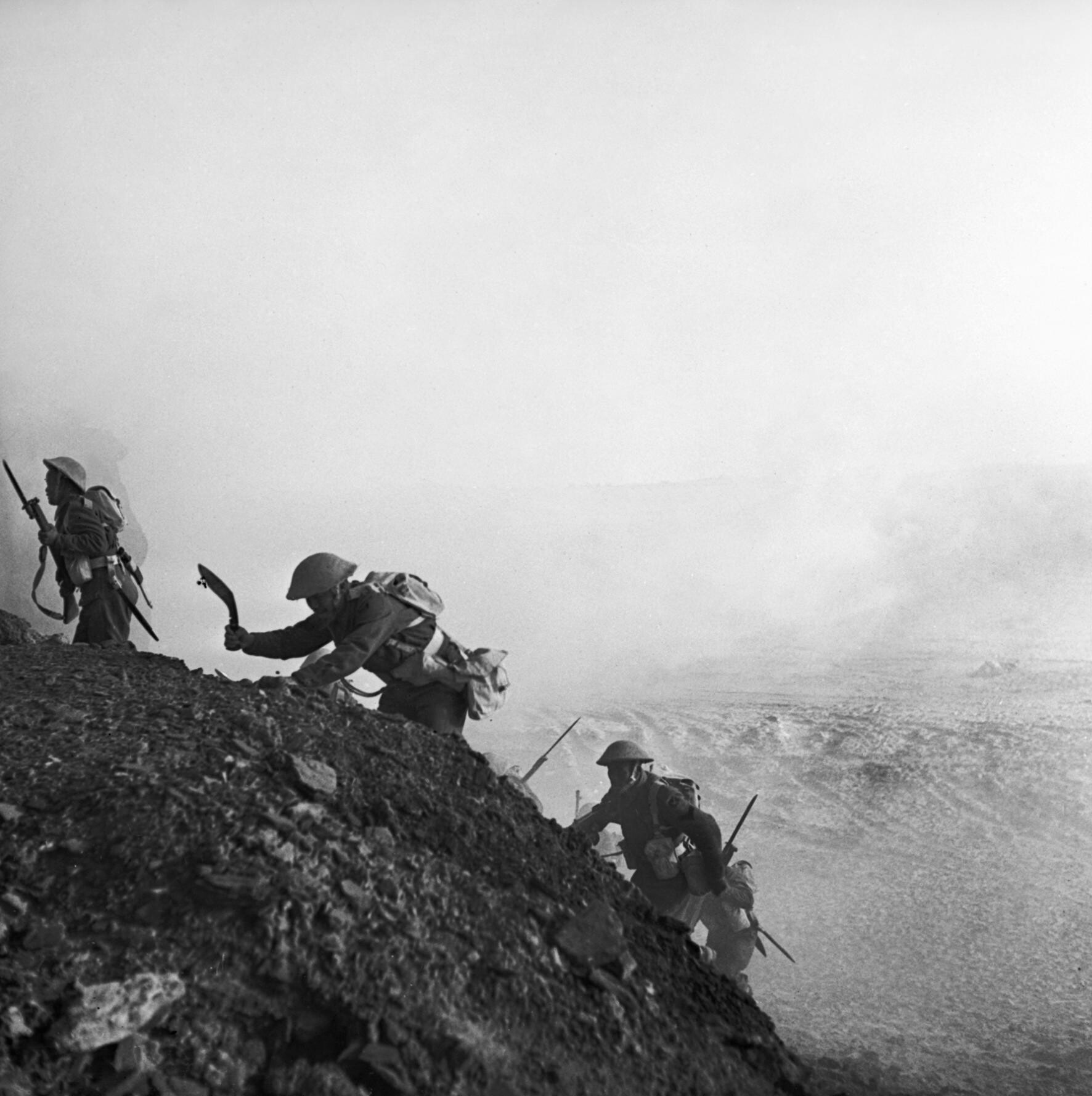
Ghurkas in action in Tunisia, 16 March 1943

== Design ==
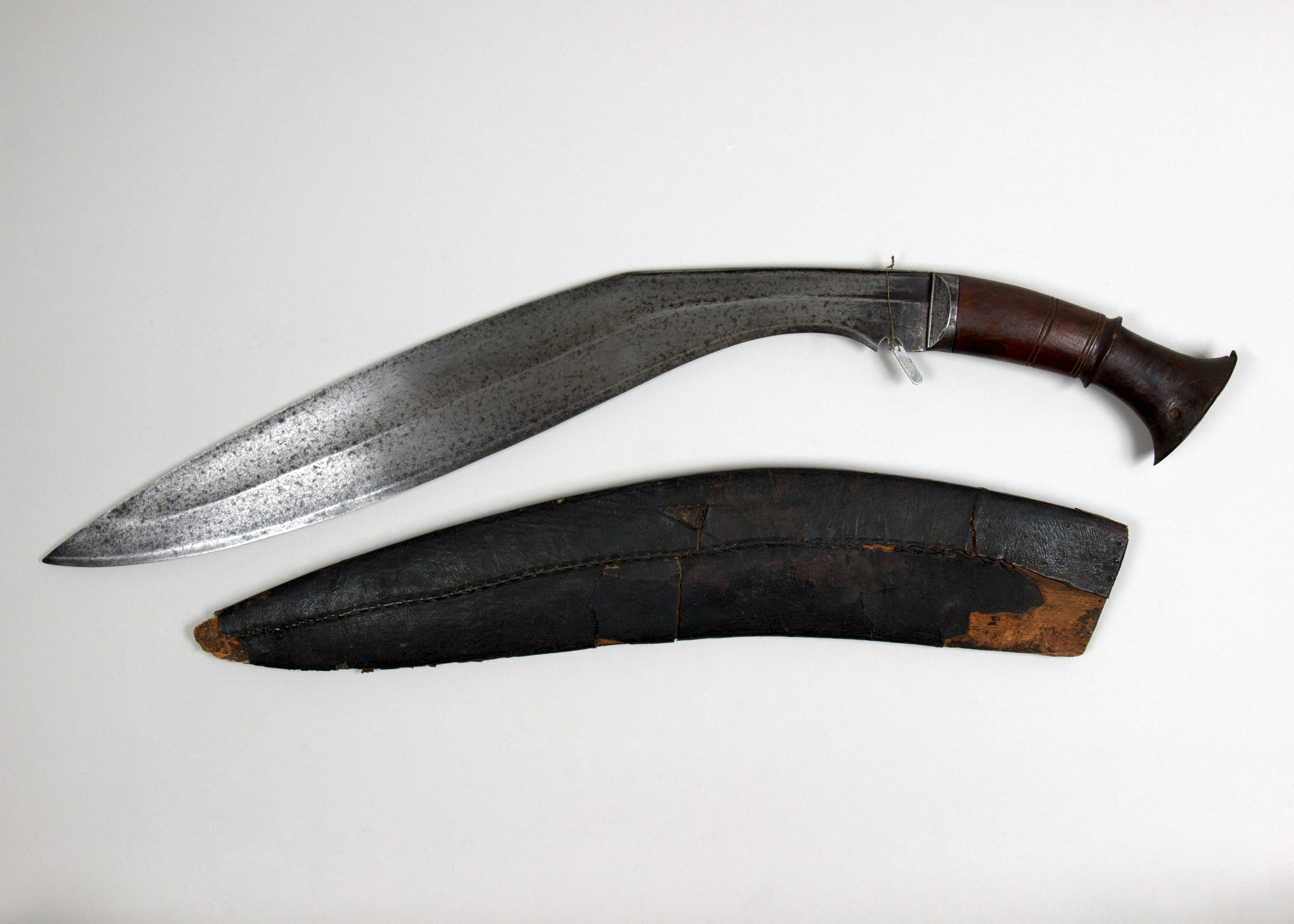
Example with notch and flared hilt

The kukri is designed primarily for chopping. The shape varies a great deal from being quite straight to highly curved with angled or smooth spines. There are substantial variations in dimensions and blade thickness depending on intended tasks as well as the region of origin and the smith that produced it. As a general guide the spines vary from 5–10 mm (0.20–0.39 in) at the handle, and can taper to 2 mm (0.079 in) by the point while the blade lengths can vary from 26–38 cm (10–15 in) for general use.

A kukri designed for general purpose use is commonly 40–45 cm (16–18 in) in overall length and weighs approximately 450–900 g (16–32 oz). Larger examples are impractical for everyday use and are rarely found except in collections or as ceremonial weapons. Smaller ones are of more limited utility, but very easy to carry.

Another factor that affects its weight and balance is the construction of the blade. To reduce weight while keeping strength, the blade might be hollow forged (or, alternatively, hollow ground), or a fuller is created. Kukris are made with several different types of fuller including tin Chira (triple fuller), Dui Chira (double fuller), Ang Khola (single fuller), or basic non-tapered spines with a large bevelled edge.

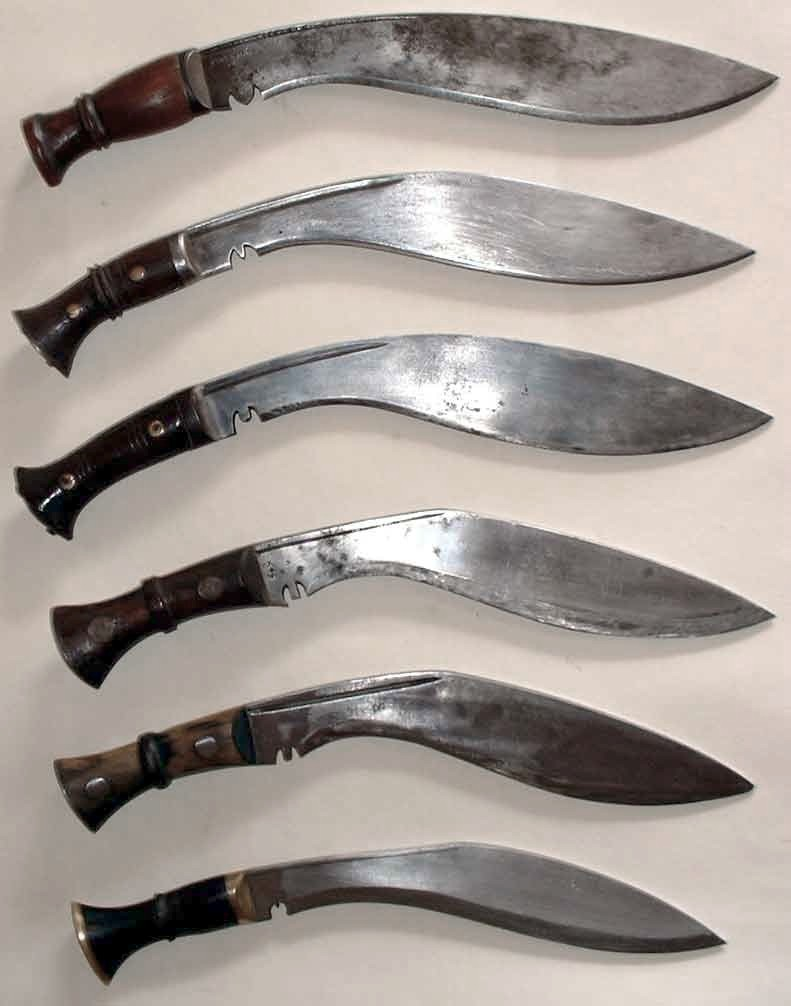
Kukris with a variety of blade shapes and sizes, with thin fullers

Kukri blades usually have a notch (karda, kauda, Gaudi, Kaura, or Cho) at the base of the blade. Various reasons are given for this, both practical and ceremonial: that it makes blood and sap drop off the blade rather than running onto the handle and thereby prevents the handle from becoming slippery; that it delineates the end of the blade whilst sharpening; that it is a symbol representing a cow's foot, or Shiva; or that it can catch another blade or kukri in combat. The notch may also represent the teats of a cow, a reminder that the kukri should not be used to kill a cow, an animal revered and worshipped by Hindus. The notch may also be used as a catch, to hold tight against a belt, or to bite onto twine to be suspended.

The handles are most often made of hardwood or water buffalo horn, but ivory, bone, and metal handles have also been produced. The handle quite often has a flared butt that allows better retention in draw cuts and chopping. Most handles have metal bolsters and butt plates which are generally made of brass or steel.

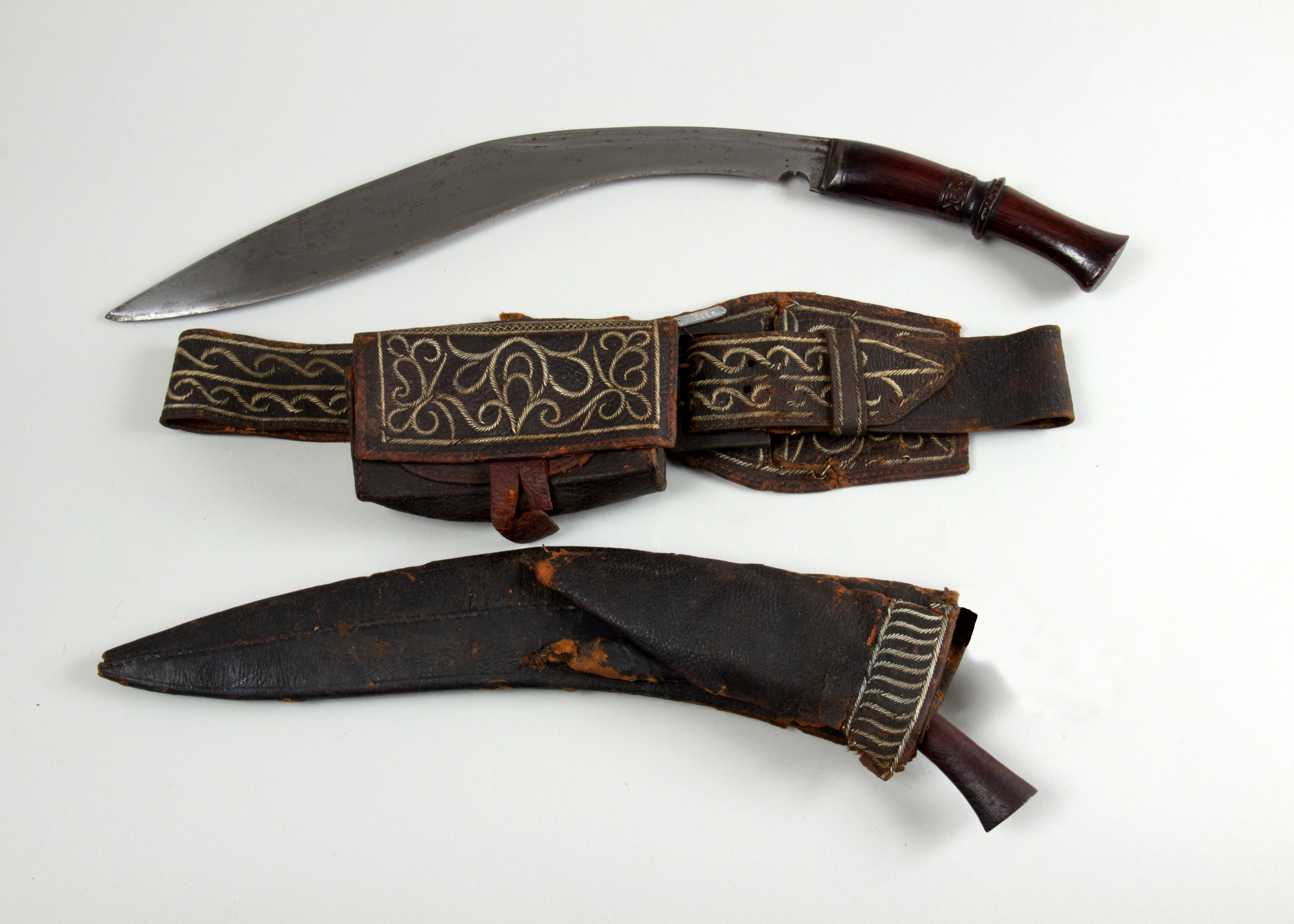
Example with decorated belt and scabbard

The traditional method of handle attachment in Nepal is a partial length "blind" tang stuck to the grip with a combination of adhesives and tight fit, although a full length tang peened over the butt plate has become popular in the more modern versions. A "slab" or "sandwich" tang, the full size and shape of the grip and exposed along the front and back, is mainly used on some military models but has not become widespread in Nepal itself.

The kukri typically comes in either a decorated wooden scabbard or one which is wrapped in leather. Traditionally, the scabbard also holds two smaller blades: an unsharpened chakmak to burnish the blade, and another accessory blade called a karda. Some older style scabbards include a pouch for carrying flint or dry tinder.

== Use ==
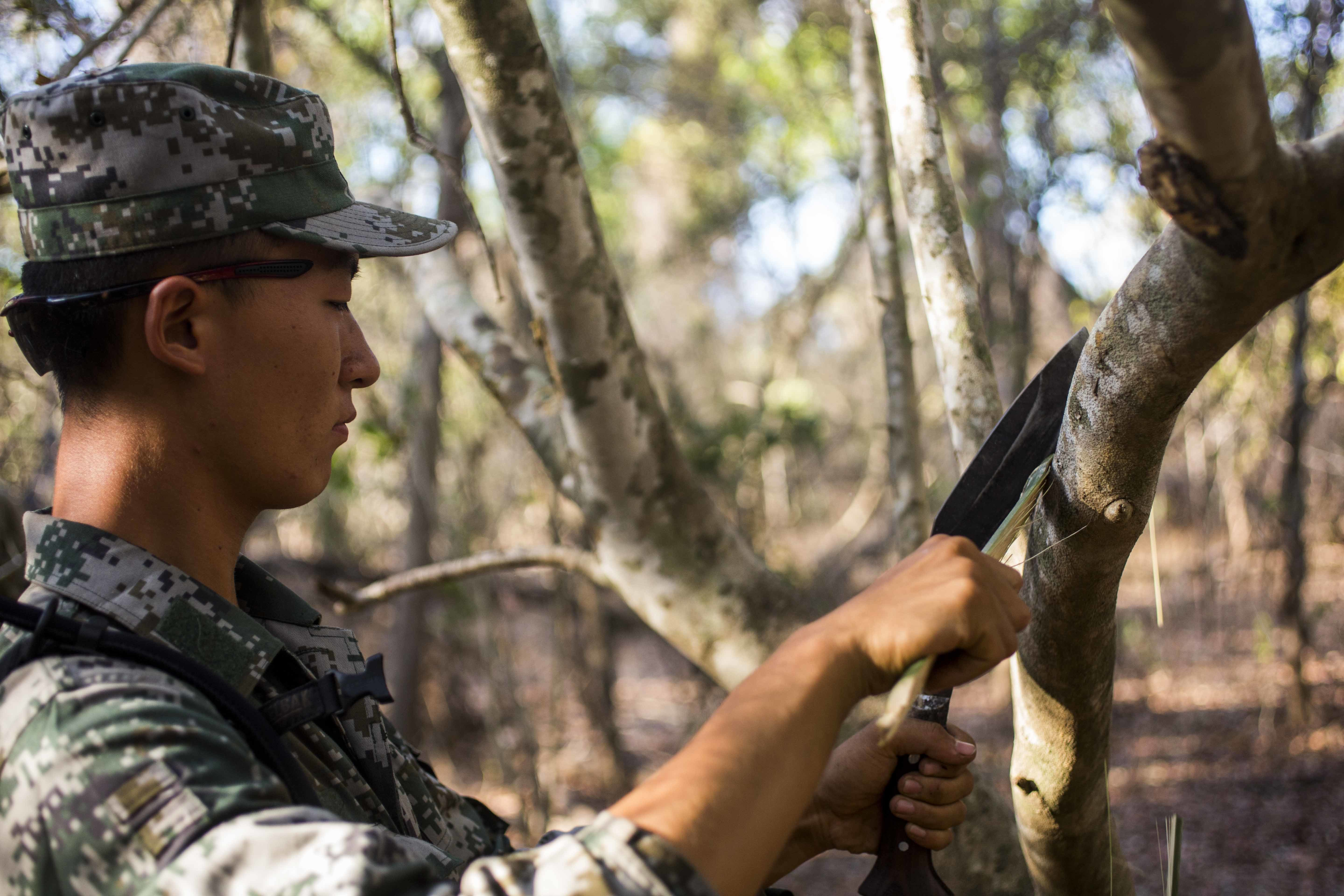
Kukri as a tool during survival training

The kukri is effective as a hatchet-like chopping tool or weapon due to its forward balance, and the expanding curve of the "belly" causes it to automatically bite in when drawn across a target which makes for an efficient draw cut.

While most famed from use in the military, the kukri is the most commonly used multipurpose tool in the fields and homes in Nepal. Its use has varied from building, clearing, chopping firewood, digging, slaughtering animals for food, cutting meat and vegetables, skinning animals, and opening cans.

The kukri is versatile. It can function as a smaller knife by using the narrower part of the blade, closest to the handle. The heavier and wider end of the blade, towards the tip, functions as an axe or a small shovel.

The kukri often appears in Nepalese heraldry and is used in many traditional, Hindu-centric rites such as wedding ceremonies.

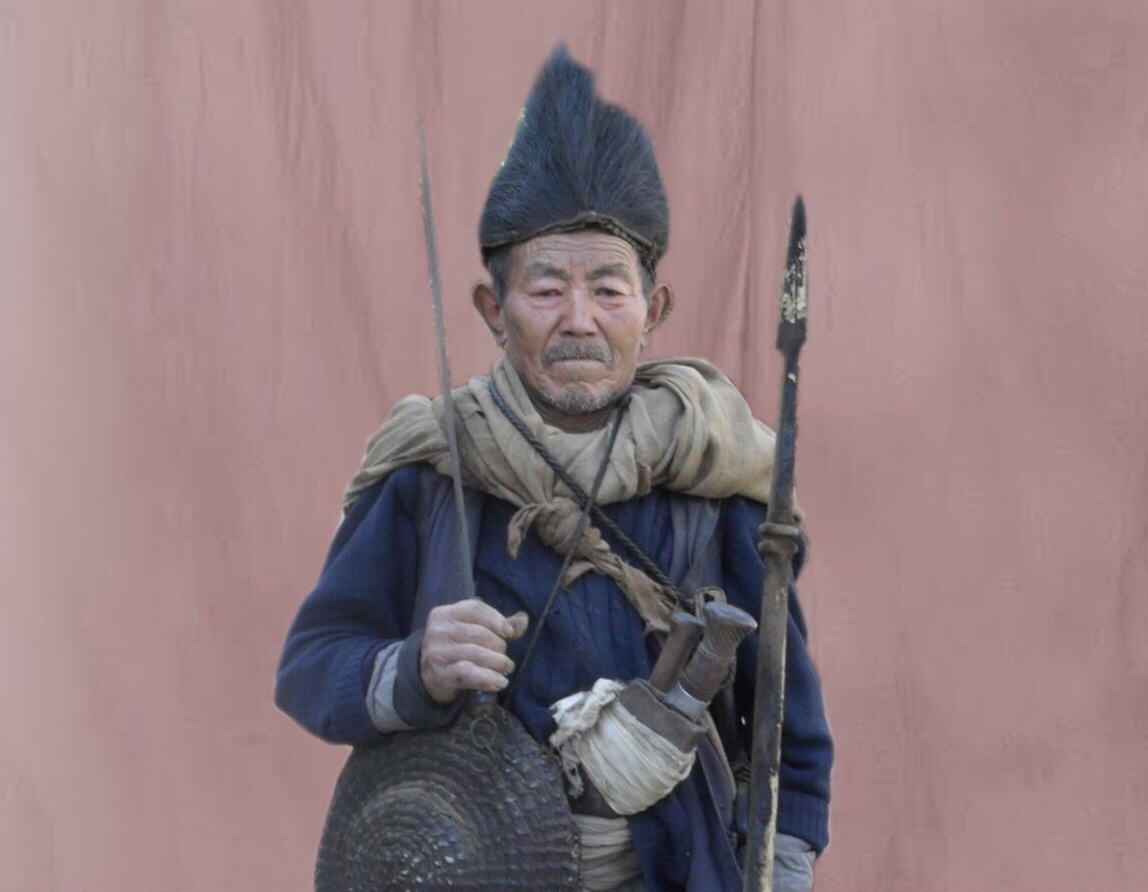
A Rai-Kirati priest wearing a kukri on his waist

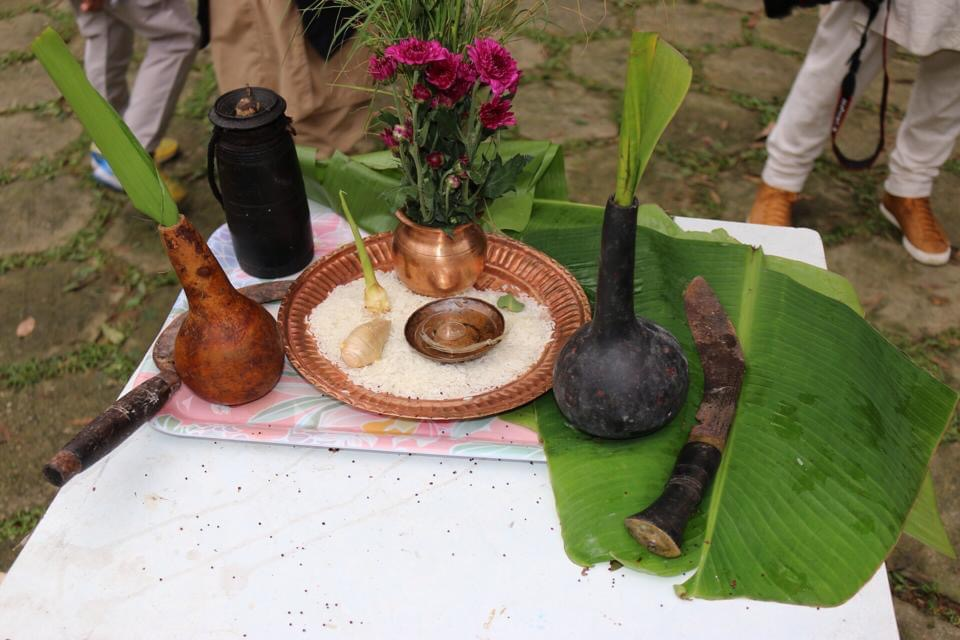
Kukri in traditional religious worship of Rai people

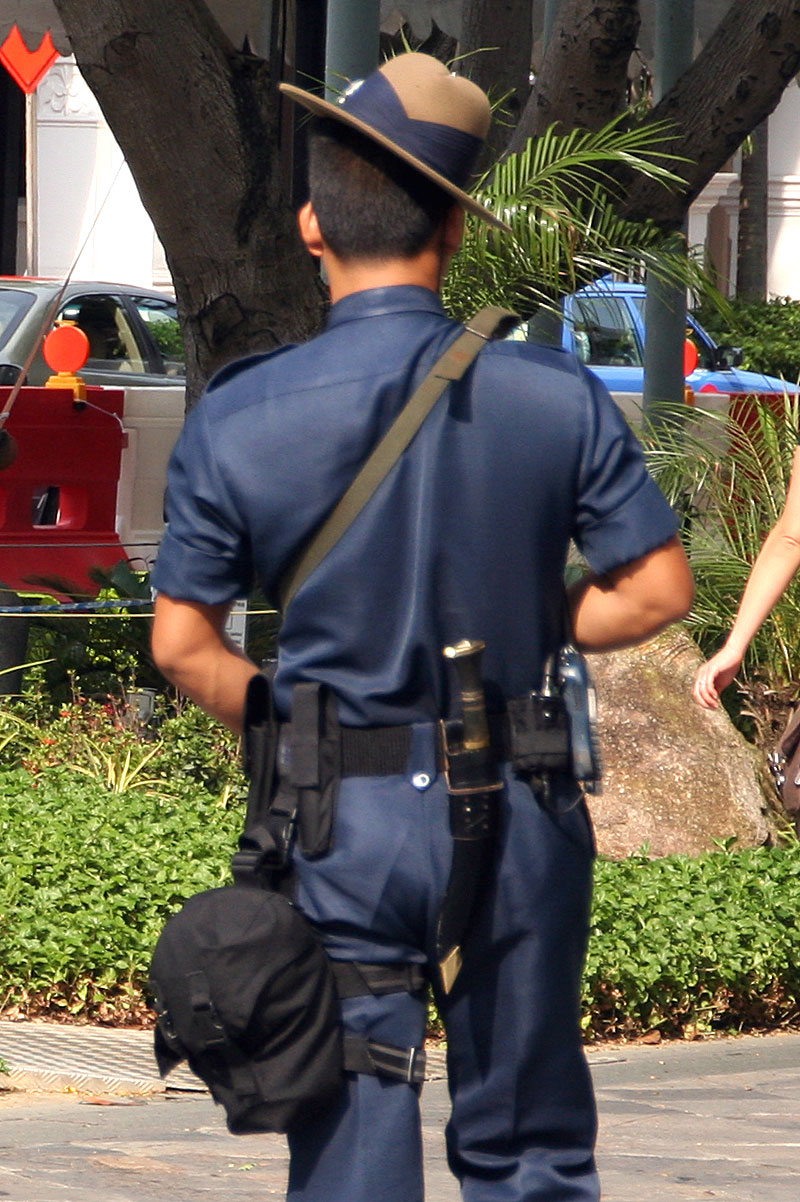
Gurkha Contingent officer with a kukri attached to his belt

Coat of arms of Nepal 1962–2008, with crossed kukris

== Manufacture ==
The Biswakarma Kami caste has inherited the traditional art of kukri-making. Modern kukri blades are often forged from spring steel, sometimes collected from recycled truck suspension units. The tang of the blade usually extends all the way through to the end of the handle; the small portion of the tang that projects through the end of the handle are hammered flat to secure the blade. Kukri blades have a hard, tempered edge and a softer spine. This enables them to maintain a sharp edge, yet tolerate impacts.

Kukri handles, usually made from hardwood or buffalo horn, are often fastened with a kind of tree sap called laha (also known as "Himalayan epoxy"). With a wood or horn handle, the tang may be heated and burned into the handle to ensure a tight fit, since only the section of handle which touches the blade is burned away. In more modern kukri, handles of cast aluminium or brass are press-fitted to the tang; as the hot metal cools it shrinks, locking onto the blade. Some kukri (such as the ones made by contractors for the modern Indian Army), have a very wide tang with handle slabs fastened on by two or more rivets, commonly called a full tang (panawal) configuration.

Traditional profiling of the blade edge is performed by a two-man team; one spins a grinding wheel forwards and backwards by means of a rope wound several times around an axle while the sharpener applies the blade. The wheel is made by hand from fine river sand bound by laha, the same adhesive used to affix the handle to the blade. Routine sharpening is traditionally accomplished by passing a chakmak over the edge in a manner similar to that used by chefs to steel their knives.

Kukri scabbards are usually made of wood or metal with an animal skin or metal or wood covering. The leather work is often done by a Sarki.

== Anatomy ==
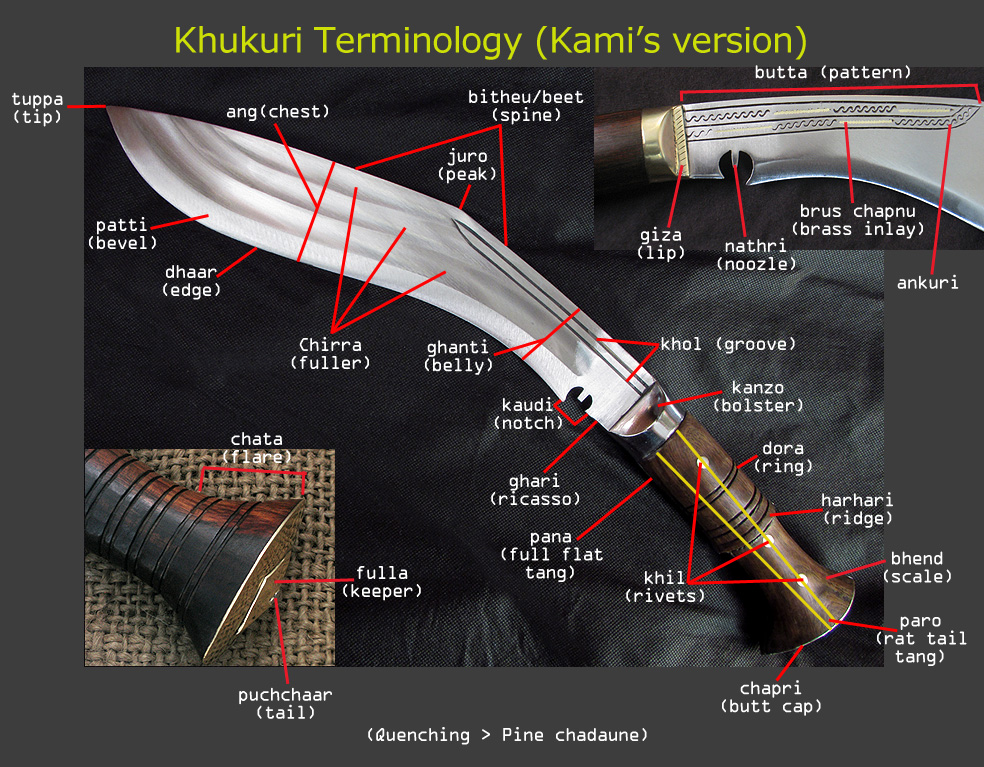
Blade terminology

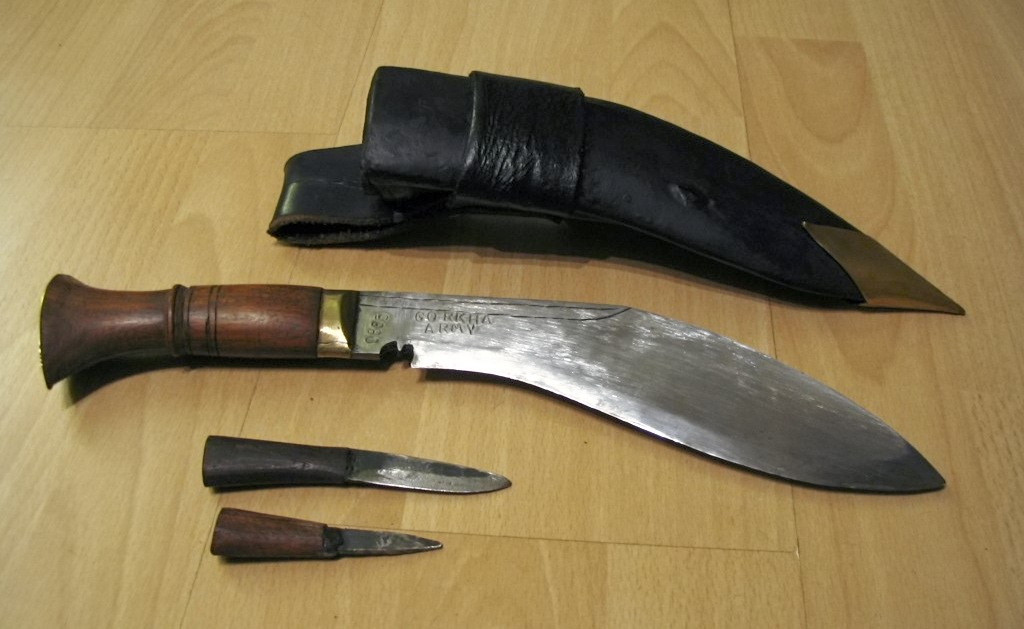
A kukri (top) with the traditional karda (middle) and chakmak (bottom); used as a utility knife and a sharpening tool respectively

Blade

- Keeper (Hira Jornu): Spade/diamond shaped metal/brass plate used to seal the butt cap.
- Butt Cap (Chapri): Thick metal/brass plate used to secure the handle to the tang.
- Tang (Paro): Rear piece of the blade that goes through the handle.
- Bolster (Kanjo): Thick metal/brass round shaped plate between blade and handle made to support and reinforce the fixture.
- Spine (Beet): Thickest blunt edge of the blade.
- Fuller/Groove (Khol): Straight groove or deep line that runs along part of the upper spine.
- Peak (Juro): Highest point of the blade.
- Main body (Ang): Main surface or panel of the blade.
- Fuller (Chirra): Curvature/hump in the blade made to absorb impact and to reduce unnecessary weight.
- Tip (Toppa): The starting point of the blade.
- Edge (Dhaar): Sharp edge of the blade.
- Belly (Bhundi): Widest part/area of the blade.
- Bevel (Patti): Slope from the main body until the sharp edge.
- Notch (Cho): A distinctive cut (numeric '3 '-like shape) in the edge. Used as a stopper when sharpening with the chakmak.
- Ricasso (Ghari): Blunt area between the notch and bolster.
- Rings (Harhari): Round circles in the handle.
- Rivet (Khil): Steel or metal bolt to fasten or secure tang to the handle.
- Tang Tail (Puchchar): Last point of the kukri blade.

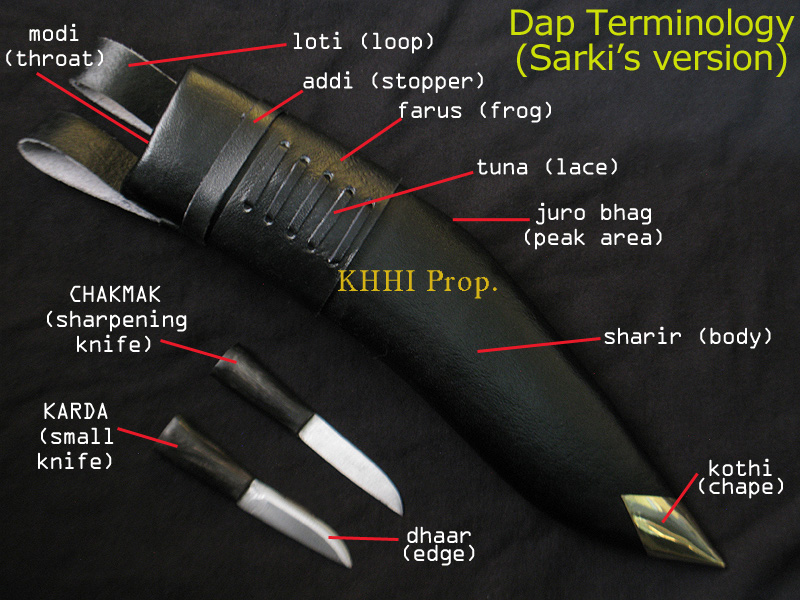
Scabbard terminology

Scabbard

- Frog (Faras): Belt holder specially made of thick leather (2–4 mm (0.079–0.157 in)) encircling the scabbard close towards the throat.
- Upper Edge (Mathillo Bhaag): Spine of the scabbard where holding should be done when handling a kukri.
- Lace (Tuna): A leather cord used to sew or attach two ends of the frog. Especially used in army types.
- Main Body (Sharir): The main body or surface of the scabbard. Generally made in semi oval shape.
- Chape (Khothi): Pointed metallic tip of the scabbard. Used to protect the naked tip of a scabbard.
- Loop (Golie): Round leather room/space where a belt goes through attached/fixed to the keeper with steel rivets.
- Throat (Mauri): Entrance towards the interior of the scabbard for the blade.
- Strap/Ridge (Bhunti): Thick raw leather encircling the scabbard made to create a hump to secure the frog from moving or wobbling (not available in this pic).
- Lower Edge (Tallo Bhag): Belly/curvature of the scabbard.

== Classification ==
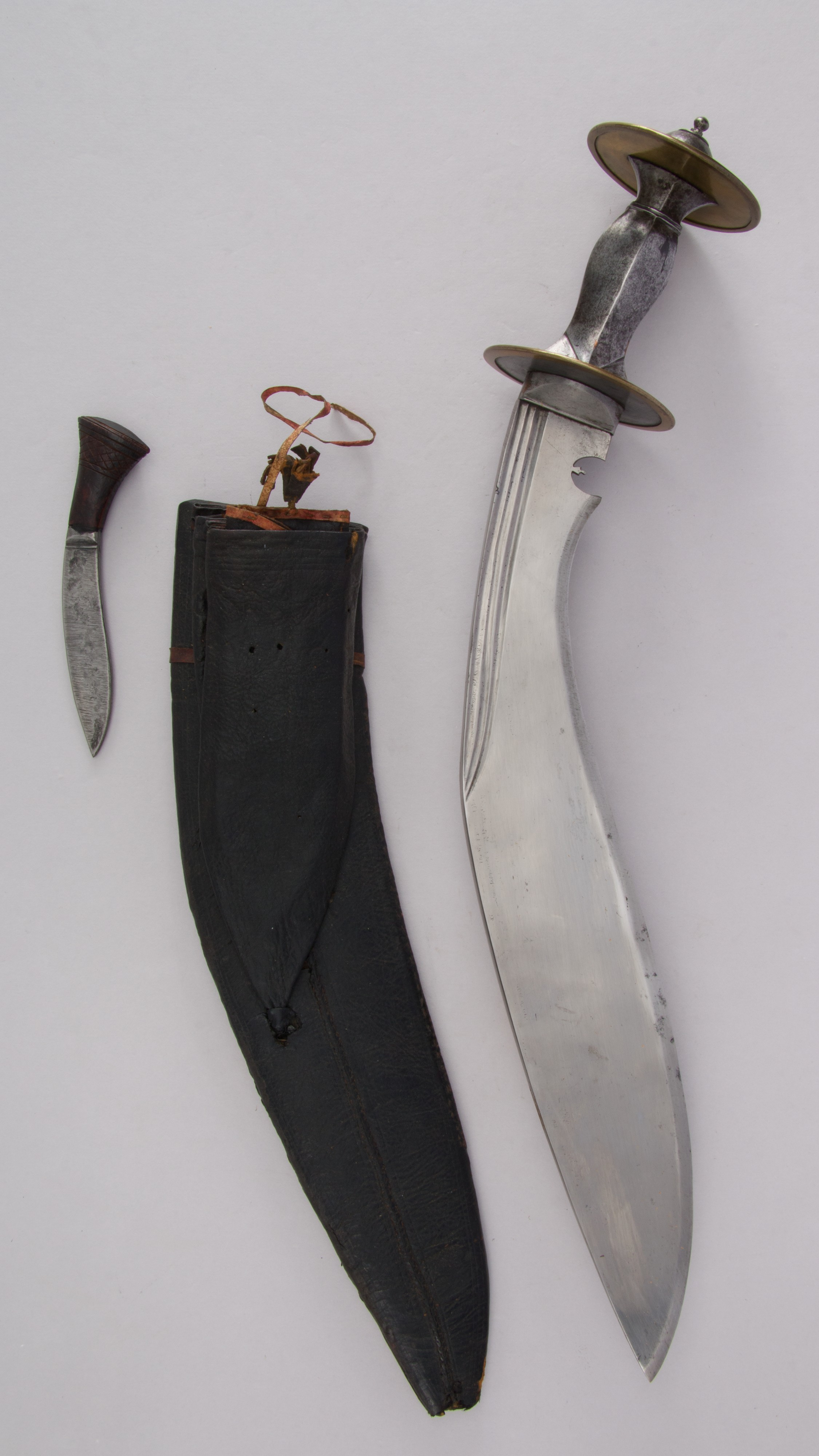
Broader, Western style

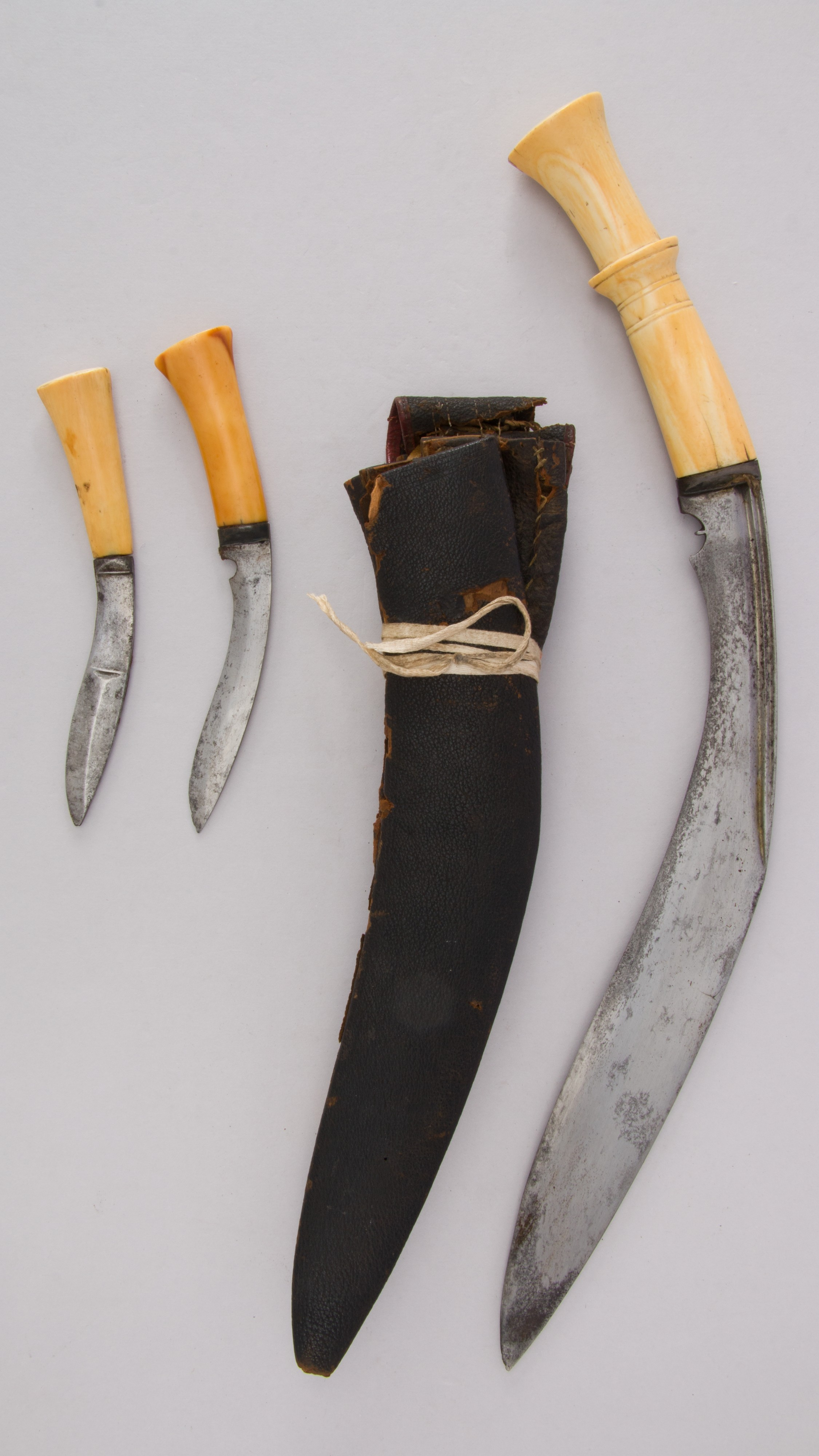
Thinner, Eastern style

Kukris can be broadly classified into two types: Eastern and Western. The Eastern blades are originated and named according to the towns and villages of Eastern Nepal.

Western blades are generally broader. Occasionally the Western style is called Budhuna, (referring to a fish with a large head), or baspate (bamboo leaf) which refers to blades just outside the proportions of the normal Sirupate blade. Despite the classification of Eastern and Western, both styles of kukri appear to be used in all areas of Nepal.

There are kukri modelled on the one used by the Gorkhali General Amar Singh Thapa. The real one is archived at National Museum of Nepal and is more curvy in nature than other traditions.

== Military adoption ==
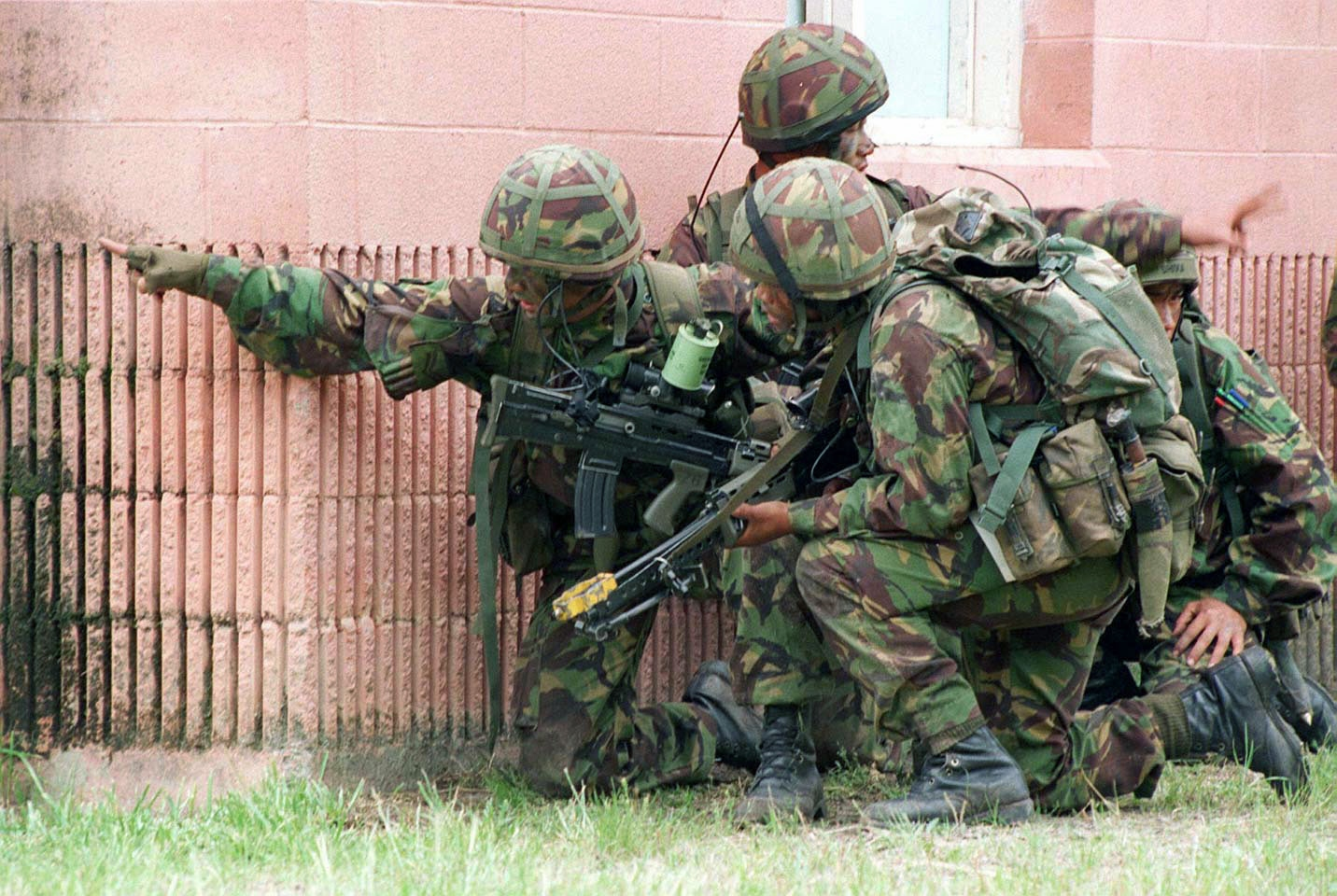
Brigade of Gurkhas on exercise, kukri scabbard on belt

The kukri is in standard service with various regiments and units within the Indian Army, such as the Assam Rifles, the Kumaon Regiment, the Garhwal Rifles and the various Gorkha regiments. Outside of its native region of South Asia, the kukri also is in service with the Brigade of Gurkhas in the British Army and Gurkha Contingent of the Singapore Police Force. The kukri is not only the staple weapon, but is also the recognisible symbol of all Gurkha military regiments and units throughout the world, so much so that some English-speakers refer to the weapon as a "Gurkha blade" or "Gurkha knife".

== See also ==
- Bolo knife – Philippine knife or sword
- Falcata – Ancient Iberian single-edged sword
- Husa knife – Forged weapon of the Achang people of China
- Khopesh – Ancient Egyptian sword
- Klewang – Bladed weapons of the Malay archipelago
- Kopis – Greek curved knife or sword
- Parang – Type of Southeast Asian knife
- Puukko – Traditional Finnish outdoor universal knife
- Machete – Type of broad and heavy knife
