= Ladieng =

- A Ladieng from Aceh, pre-1911.
- Type: Klewang sword / Parang (knife)
- Place of origin: Indonesia (Aceh & North Sumatra)

Service history
- Used by: Acehnese people, Gayo people, Alas people

Specifications
- Length: overall length: approx. 66–77 cm (26–30 in)
- Blade type: Straight single edged
- Hilt type: Wood, Horn

The Ladieng (also known as Klewang-Ladieng, Ladeng, Ladeeng, Roedoes Lentik, Rudus Lenti, Sonagang-Klewang) is a sword from Sumatra, Indonesia. It is also commonly known as Parang Lading in Malaysia.

It is originally thought to be an agricultural tool used for cutting brushwood and grass, that has made its way into Malay martial arts, Silat and as a weapon. Unfortunately it is too a convenient weapon of offence by gang robbers.

== Description ==
The Ladieng has a slightly curved, single-edged blade. The blade widens from the hilt to the tip. It is slightly curved, has neither a central ridge nor a hollow ground and is rounded in place. Many of the blades were made from Damascus steel. The lines in the steel are called kuree by the Acehnese people and kure by the Gayo people and Alas people. The hilt has no guard, is made of wood and decorated with traditional carvings. The Ladieng is available in various versions, which differ in blade and handle shape. In Aceh it is called Ladieng, in Gayo and Alas Rudus Lenti. It is used by various ethnic groups in Sumatra. The Ladieng is a version of the klewang.

== See also ==
- Co Jang
- Rudus
