= Piso Podang =

Type of sword from Maritime Southeast Asia

- Type: Sword
- Place of origin: Indonesia

Service history
- Used by: Batak, Malay and Dayak peoples

Specifications
- Blade type: Single edged blade
- Hilt type: Pommel
- Scabbard/sheath: usually Brass, silver, iron and hardwood

The piso podang (pronounced [pi.so po.daŋ]), also spelled pisau pedang and pisu pudang, is a type of curved sword or sabre in Indonesia by the Batak.

== History ==
The piso pedang was made likely around the 19th century, though it could have been earlier, around the 18th century, but most definitely after the arrival of Europeans in the region. Created by the Batak people. It was later spread to Borneo, Sumatra and the Malay peninsula, where the Malays and Dayaks used them in war likely leading to the creation of the chenangkas, a variant that comes in curved and straight forms.

== Characteristics ==
The piso podang has a curved, single-edged sabre blade. The blade has one or two light to deep hollow grinds. The blades usually have a back edge that runs from the point to the hilt. This edge is approximately 9 cm to 18 cm long. The blades are often of European manufacture. The back of the blade is concave, while the edge (Indonesian: mata ni podang or baba ni podang) is convex. Some blades are made of Indian parmor steel, similar to Damascus steel. The hilt is shaped similarly to that of the talwar and features a cross-shaped guard with diamond-shaped or notched ends. It is made of various metals or hardwood. The pommel is cupped and widely spaced to prevent the handle from slipping out of the hand. The scabbards are made of two pieces of wood and secured with metal or rattan bands. The influence of the talwar from India led to the development of the piso podang. In some versions, it is a direct copy of the Talwar. The name was translated from the Portuguese "espadao" (pronounced espadang). There are several versions.

== See also ==
- Piso Halasan
- Piso Gading
