= Piso Sanalenggam =

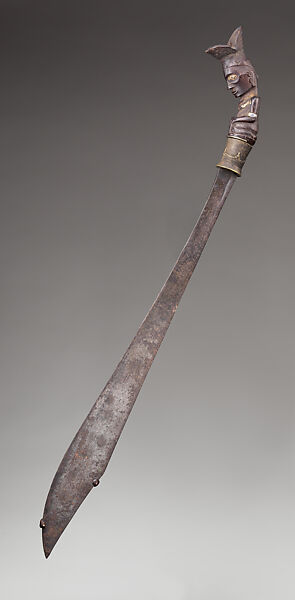
- A Piso Sanalenggam from Sumatra, late 19th–early 20th century.
- Type: Sword
- Place of origin: Indonesia (North Sumatra)

Service history
- Used by: Batak (Toba Batak people and Pakpak people)

Specifications
- Length: 46–55 cm (18–22 in)
- Blade type: Single edge
- Hilt type: Water buffalo horn
- Scabbard/sheath: Wood

The Piso Sanalenggam (also known as Piso Sanalenngan, Piso Sinalenggam, Piso Sinalenggan, Piso Surik Sinalenggan, or Sanalenggam) is a type of broad sabre from North Sumatra, Indonesia. This sword is a weapon of war during the times when feuds were frequent among the different Batak groups. Piso Sanalenggam that were made by datu priests from the Dairi Regency region, is used for the preparation of medicine and magical substances.

== Description ==
The Piso Sanallengam has a single-edged, heavy slashing blade. The blade widens from the hilt to the spot. The focus is close to the place. The blade usually has neither a hollow grind nor a central ridge. The cutting edge runs in an S-shape and curves slightly from the back of the blade to the point. The hilt is carved from wood or horn and decorated or split at the end. The hilt is bent towards the pommel. The ferrule and the pommel are usually made of brass. The scabbards are made of wood and flat. The mouth hole is wider than the blade and protrudes towards the cutting edge. The sheath end is bent. The Piso Sanalenggam is used by the Batak ethnic group.

== See also ==
- Piso Halasan
