= Cot Jang =

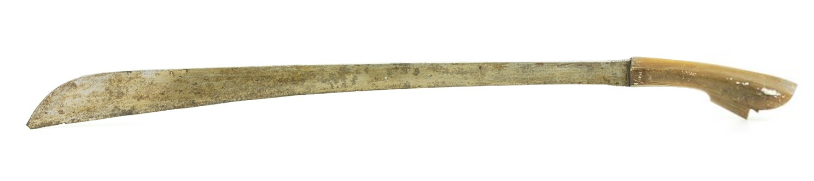
- A Cot Jang klewang from Aceh, pre-1940.
- Type: Klewang sword
- Place of origin: Indonesia (Aceh & North Sumatra)

Service history
- In service: Aceh War (1873–1904)
- Used by: Acehnese people

Specifications
- Length: blade length: approx. 66–77 cm (26–30 in)
- Blade type: Straight single edged
- Hilt type: Wood, Horn
- Scabbard/sheath: Wood

The Cot Jang (also known as Gliwang, Tjot Jang, Klewang Cok Jang, Klewang Tjok Jang, Klewang Tjok Jang, Tjo Jang, Tjok Ilang, Tjok Jang, Tioq Jang or Tjot Jang) is a sword from Aceh and North Sumatra, Indonesia.

== Description ==
The Cot Jang has a slightly curved single-edged blade. The blade widens from the hilt to the tip. The back of the blade is straight and rounded towards the cutting edge. The hilt has no guard and is made of wood or horn. The pommel is shaped like a horse's hoof, notched and slightly curved. There are no typical sheath for this type. Wrapped palm leaves or a kind of goat skin quiver are probably used for storage and protection. The Cot Jang's blades are often made from very fine, bright and thin-layered Pamor steel (similar to Damascus steel).

== See also ==
- Amanremu
- Sikin Panyang
- Rudus
