= Dua Lalan =

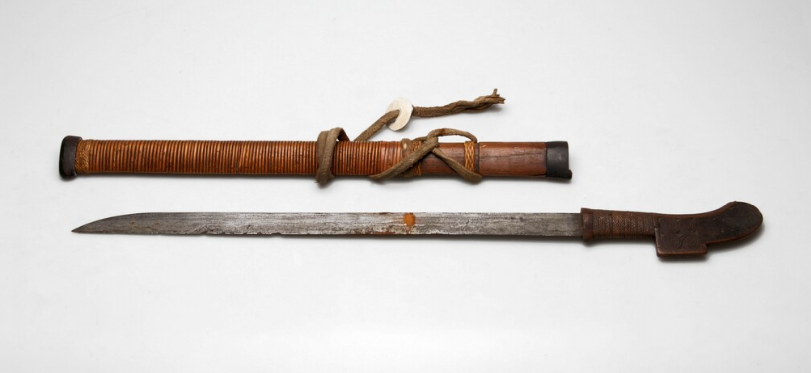
- A Dua Lalan sword from Tana Toraja Regency, pre-1917.
- Type: Klewang sword
- Place of origin: Indonesia (Sulawesi)

Service history
- Used by: Torajan people

Specifications
- Length: overall length: approx. 63–71 cm (25–28 in)
- Blade type: Straight single edged
- Hilt type: Wood, Horn
- Scabbard/sheath: Wood

Dua Lalan (meaning, "dual purpose" in Toraja-Saʼdan language) is a sword originating from Sulawesi, Indonesia.

== Description ==
The Dua Lalan has a straight, single-edged blade. The blade is just as wide at the hilt as it is at the rounded point. It has neither a central ridge nor a hollow grind. The hilt is generally made of wood or horn, has no guard, and is decorated with carvings or wrapped and decorated with metal wire or sheet metal. The sheaths are made of wood, have a small heel at the bottom, and are wrapped with rattan cords. The Dua Lalan is used in Sulawesi as a war and ceremonial sword, among other things, when sacrificing bulls.

== See also ==
- Penai (sword)
- Moso (sword)
- Alamang
