= Kelantanese klewang =

Kelantanese Klewang
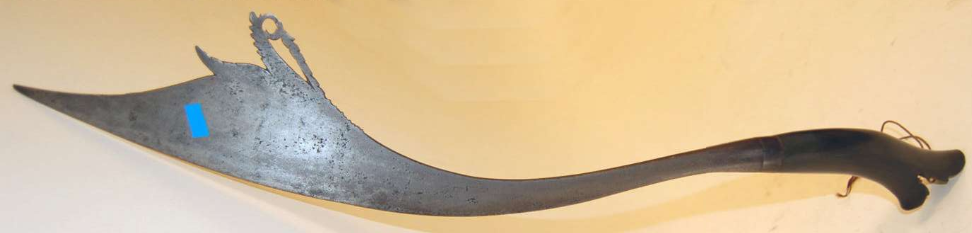
- A Kelantanese klewang with an elaborative decoration on the spine of the blade, 1940s.
- Type: Klewang sword
- Place of origin: Malaysia (Kelantan)

Service history
- Used by: Kelantanese Malay people

Specifications
- Length: Approximately 16 inch (40.64 cm) to 20 inch (50.8 cm) blade and 17cm handle
- Blade type: Single edge
- Hilt type: Water buffalo horn or wood
- Scabbard/sheath: No scabbard

The Kelantanese klewang or Kelantanese kelewang (Kelewang Kelantan or Klewang Kelantan in Malay language or Kelewe Kelate in Kelantanese Malay) is a style of klewang originating from Kelantan, Malaysia but is also popular in other northern Malaysia Peninsula states such as Kedah and Perlis.

The Kelantanese klewang is believed to be as old as the parang, became a distinct weapon by the late 18th century. In the 19th century, Kelantanese men would wear the Kelantanese klewang behind their sarong with the blade protruding out.

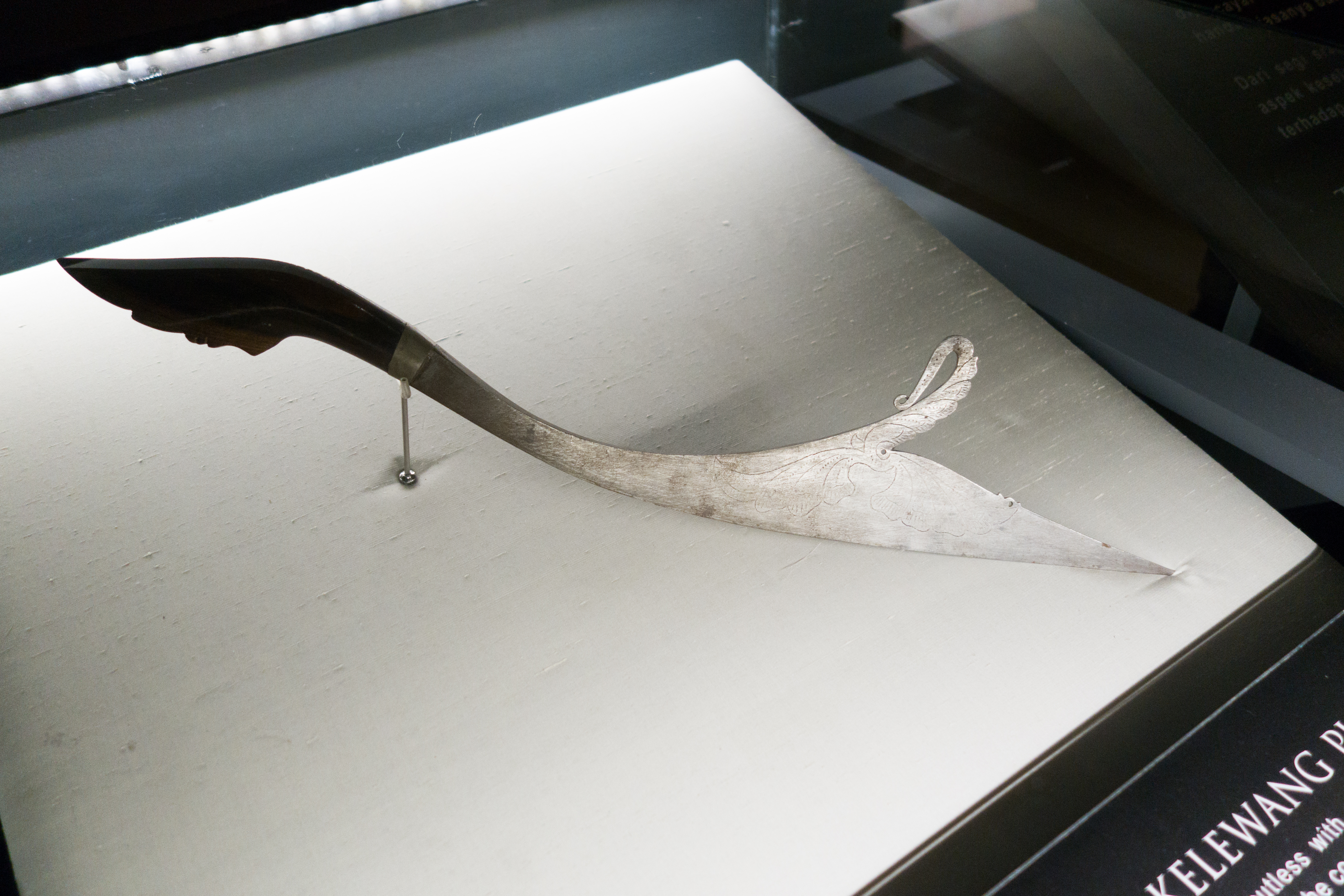
A Kelantanese style Klewang called Kelewang Pucuk Berkait.

The weapon features a single edged, curved belly blade, with its tapered tip clipped and forming decorative loop or spike at the spine of the blade. The handle is carved to the shape of a horse hoof or a Makara (Hindu mythology).

The Kelantanese klewang is used in martial arts but it is also often associated with violent gang crimes. In 2012, about a dozen of gang members from 3 different gangs in Kelantan were arrested for 10 cases of assault, armed-robbery and confiscation of weapons including the kelewang.

There are variety of Kelantanese klewangs such as Kelewang Pucuk Berkait, Kelewang Jambul and so on.

This weapon was featured in the American bladesmithing competition, Forged in Fire (TV series)'s season 5 episode 15.

== See also ==
- Parang Bongkok
- Parang Ginah
