= Parang Bongkok =

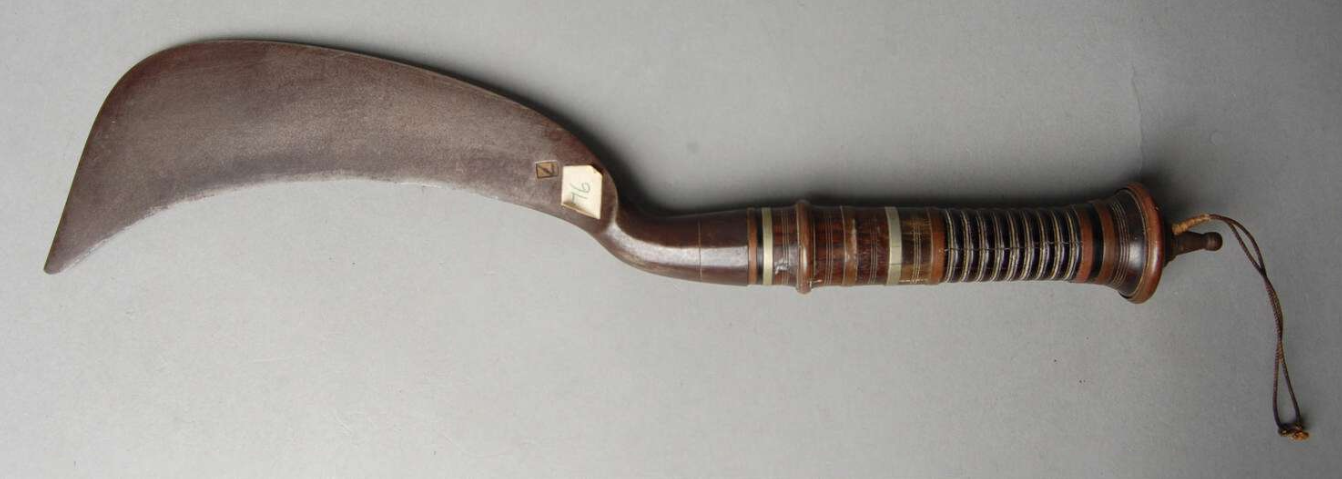
- A Parang Bongkok from Kelantan, 1940s.
- Type: Billhook parang (knife)
- Place of origin: Malaysia (Kelantan)

Service history
- Used by: Kelantanese Malay people

Specifications
- Length: blade length: approx. 43 to 48 cm (17 to 19 in)
- Blade type: Single edge
- Hilt type: Wood
- Scabbard/sheath: No scabbard

The Parang Bongkok (bongkok in Malay language literally means "hunched") is a billhook parang that originates from Kelantan, Malaysia.

It has the shape of a sickle but it is broad at the middle of its blade with a steep drop point at the tip. The blade is joined to the handle with an integral neck. The handle, made of wood, has a simply turned stupa shape.

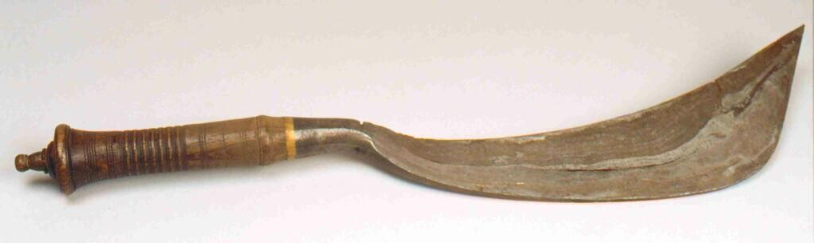
A Parang Bongkok with laminated steel blade.

== See also ==
- Parang Ginah
- Kelantanese klewang
