= Alamang =

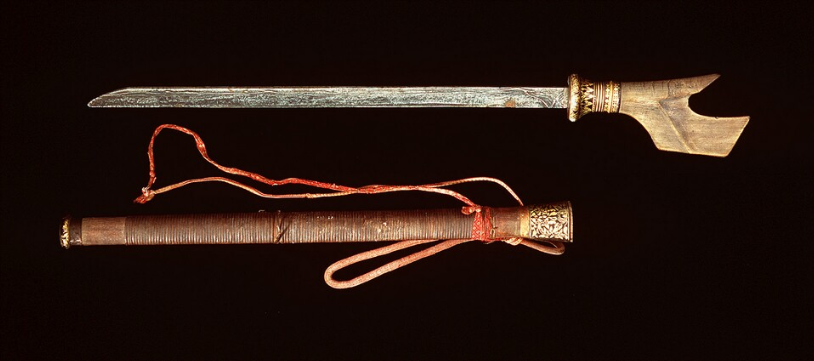
- An Alamang from South Sulawesi, pre-1916.
- Type: Sword
- Place of origin: Indonesia (Sulawesi)

Service history
- Used by: Bugis people, Makassarese people

Specifications
- Length: 74 cm (29 in)
- Blade type: Single edge, flat grind
- Hilt type: Wood, buffalo horn
- Scabbard/sheath: Wood

Alamang (in Bugis language, sometimes Halamang or Lamang) or Sonriʼ (in Makassarese language) is a sacred sword or cutlass of the Bugis and Makassarese people in Sulawesi, Indonesia.

== Description ==
A sword with a flattened, heavy and deeply indented hilt. The blade's edge and back are straight and parallel. The back curves towards the edge at the point. The Alamang has a straight, plain scabbard with sometimes a small foot. The scabbard's mouth is somewhat broadened.

== Cultural ==
The Alamang is a symbol of sovereignty, prosperity, and dignity of a kingdom. It is said that in the past the king would not leave his kingdom without his Alamang. As it is considered as the greatness of the kingdom, certainly the Alamang is very exclusive. Nobody including the empu (Kris maker) or blacksmith that have sworn, are allowed to make copies the Alamang for it is the weapon of the king. Those who failed to abide by this law were executed.

== See also ==
- Dua Lalan
- Penai (sword)
- Moso (sword)
