= Parang Ginah =

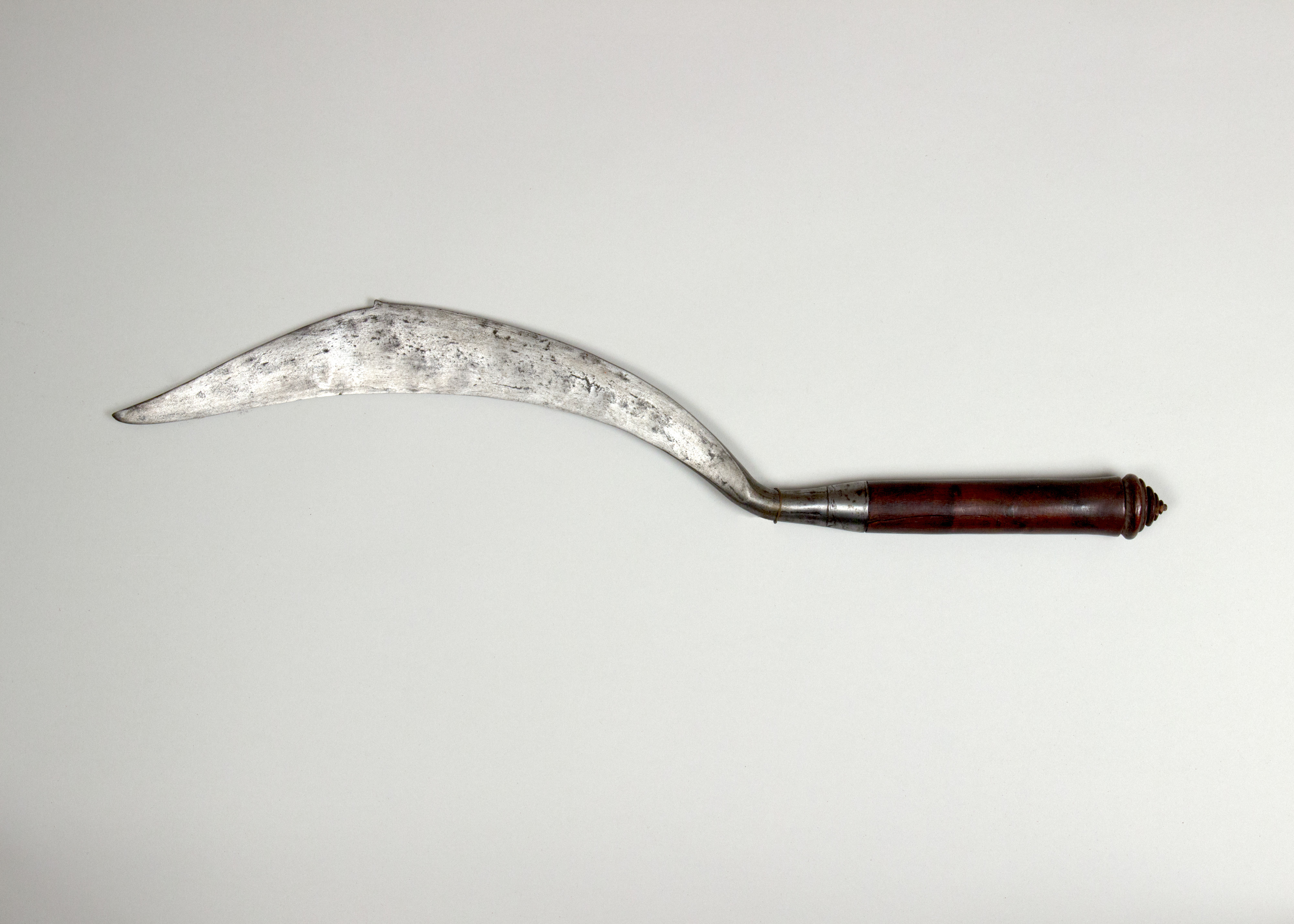
- A Parang Ginah, 18th–19th century.
- Type: Sickle parang (knife)
- Place of origin: Malaysia (Northern Malay Peninsula)

Service history
- Used by: Kelantanese Malay people, Terengganuan Malays

Specifications
- Length: Approximately 58 cm (23 in)
- Blade type: Single edge
- Hilt type: Wood
- Scabbard/sheath: No scabbard

The Parang Ginah is a sickle shaped Malay cutting implement, whether a sword or a sickle is uncertain, most likely the latter.

The Parang Ginah has a sickle-shaped blade about 30 cm long. The blade is narrow at the hilt (handle) and widens towards the middle. From the middle, the blade gets narrower towards the tip and is slightly curved upwards at the point (tip). A small, forward-pointing hook is forged into the upper spine of the blade. The lower side of the blade is concave and sharpened. The Parang Ginah has no guard. The handle is round and usually made of wood or horn. The pommel consists of a decorated metal cap that is screwed to the blade tang. The Parang Ginah was also used as a sickle for work.

== See also ==
- Parang Bongkok
- Kelantanese klewang
