= Hemola =

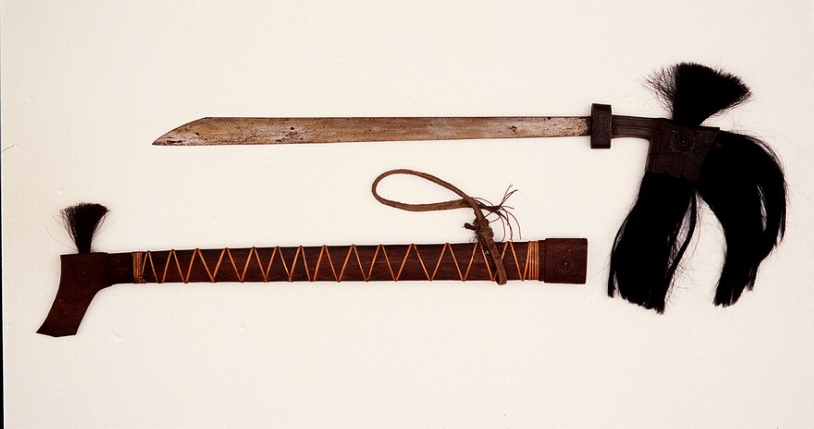
- A Hemola sword from Savu island, pre-1861.
- Type: Klewang sword
- Place of origin: Indonesia (Savu and Rote Island) and Timor

Service history
- Used by: Savu people, Rotenese people

Specifications
- Length: approximately 53 cm (21 in) blade and 15 cm (5.9 in) handle
- Blade type: Single edge
- Hilt type: Wood, horse hair
- Scabbard/sheath: Wood, horse hair

Hemola or Hemala is a traditional sword of the Savu people from Indonesia. It is also called Tafa by the neighboring Rotenese people.

== Description ==
The Hemola has a straight, single-edged blade. The blade widens from the hilt towards the tip. The tip is angled off. The back of the blade is longer than the cutting edge. The hilt is made of wood and has a round wooden guard. The hilt is square in shape at the pommel area and often has a carved eye in the center that has a mythological background. The pommel is usually decorated with tufts of horsehair on three sides. The scabbards are made of wood, are in two parts and wrapped with rattan cords for better attachment. The shoe end of the scabbard is bent over and decorated with a tuft of horse hair.

== Culture ==
The Hemola sword is closely tied to the culture of the Savu people. It is even mentioned in their ethnic origin folklore. It is used in pewue bangngu ceremony, a ritual for constructing or raising the beams of house building. In other ceremonial rituals such as for warding off bad luck or mishap in opening a new place, one of the acts includes sacrificing a lamb with a Hemola sword. The Hemola is also used in traditional dance of the Savu people.

== See also ==
- Belida (sword)
- Moso (sword)
- Rugi (sword)
