= Penai (sword) =

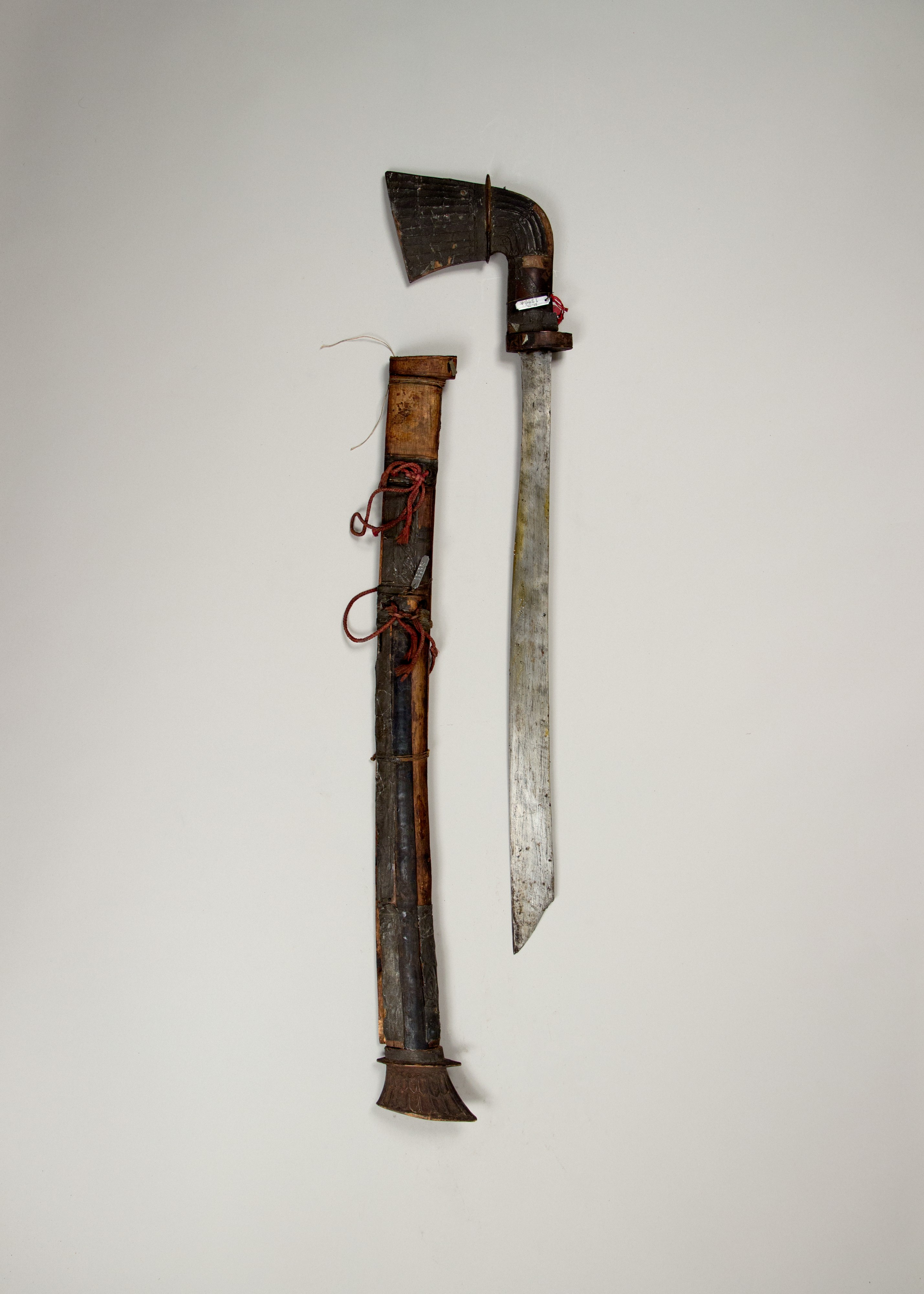
- A Penai sword from Gorontalo, North Sulawesi, circa 18th–19th century.
- Type: Klewang sword
- Place of origin: Indonesia (Sulawesi)

Service history
- Used by: Pamona people, Torajan people

Specifications
- Length: approximately 60 cm (24 in)
- Blade type: Single edge, convex grind
- Hilt type: Buffalo horn
- Scabbard/sheath: Wood

Penai is a machete-like sword found in Sulawesi, Indonesia. Traditionally, it is used for both war and agricultural tools. It is used by the Bare'e speaking Torajan people and Pamona people.

== Description ==
Its blade broadens somewhat towards the end and slightly curves upwards at the tip with its edge longer than the back of the blade. The hilt is made from buffalo horns and decorated with carvings. The scabbard is made of thick wood, and it has two holes on it for girding to the user's waist.

== See also ==
- Dua Lalan
- Alamang
- Moso (sword)
