= Rudus =

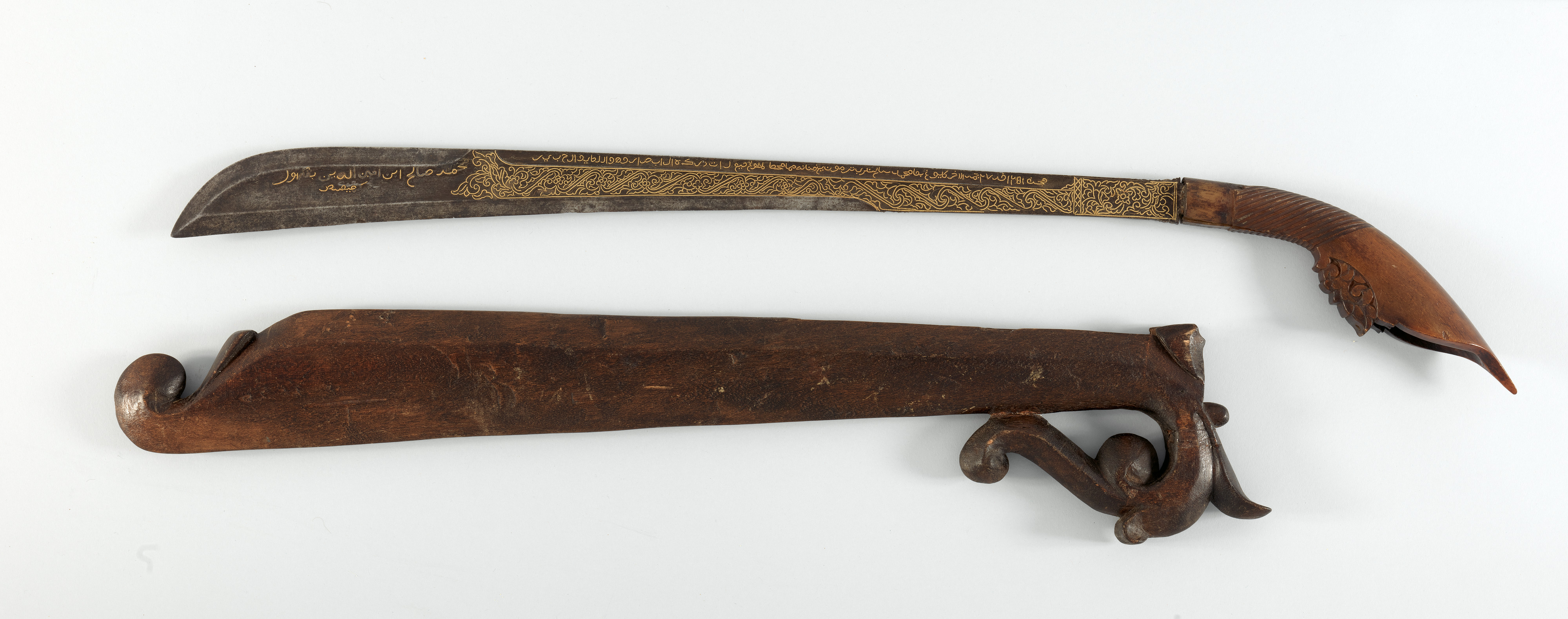
- A rudus displayed in the Metropolitan Museum of Art shows a style distinctive to the region of northern Sumatra inhabited by the Aceh and Pakpak people.
- Type: Klewang sword
- Place of origin: Indonesia (Sumatra)

Service history
- Used by: Malay people

Specifications
- Hilt type: Wood
- Scabbard/sheath: Wood

A Rudus is a sword or cutlass associated with the Malay culture of Sumatra. Together with the pemandap, the rudus is among the largest swords of Malay people. Rudus is also a symbol of certain Malay state in the Island, e.g. the Province of Bengkulu in Sumatra, Indonesia.

== Description ==
The rudus is associated with the Islamic Malay culture. It is found to be more common in Sumatra than in the Malay peninsula. Together with the pemandap, the rudus is considered to be a symbol of the Sumatran Malay culture. The Acehnese people and the Malay of Bengkulu are recorded to have the rudus as their cultural identity. Rudus is also found in the Malay Banjar people of South Kalimantan, where it was an official traditional weapon of the province of South Kalimantan, together with the kuduk.

In the Islamic period of Indonesia, the island of Sumatra was divided into multiple small sultanates that were at war with each other. The province of Bengkulu in South Sumatra alone had many sultanates, among the sultanates were the Sultanate of Sungai Serut, Selebar, Pat Petulai, Balai Buntar, Sungai Lemau, Sekiris, Gedung Agung and Marau Riang. These warring sultanate states would equip their warriors with weapons e.g. the badik, rambai ayam and rudus. Rudus was also used in the ceremony of the election of the datuk, the chief of the adat.

During the colonial period, rudus was used by the natives as a form of resistance toward the colonial government. Because of this romanticized patriotic notion of using the rudus to rise against the oppressor, the rudus is featured in the seal of the Bengkulu province to symbolize heroism.

== Form ==
The seal of the province of Bengkulu features two rudus.

The rudus consists of the mata (literally "eyes", the blade), the ulu ("hilt"), and the sarung ("sheath").

The rudus is often inscribed with Jawi script at certain parts of the sword, usually at the blade or at the hilt. The Jawi script is a kind of Perso-Arabic alphabet that was used for writing the Malay language, especially by the Acehnese, Banjarese, and Minangkabau. The maker of the rudus sword would carve the date of the completion of the sword, as well as his name and his village of origin. In some cases, however, the inscription indicated the date of the re-decoration of the blade. A rudus kept in the Metropolitan Museum of Art in New York City has inscription which identifies that the artist came from a village in Peninsular Malaysia, however the shape of the decoration is not endemic to the Peninsular Malaysia, but more to the northern Sumatran region which is inhabited by the Aceh and the Batak Pakpak people. This indicates that the rudus was brought from Sumatra to neighboring Malaysia to be redecorated.

Inscriptions can be written on the blade or on the hilt. The Metropolitan Museum of Art example has the inscriptions inlaid with gold. Some chose to carve it on its wooden hilt.

The rudus is carried slung at the side.

== See also ==
- Co Jang
- Surik (sword)

== Cited works ==
- Newbold, T.J. (1839). Political and Statistical Account of the British Settlements in the Straits of Malacca. Oxford University.
