= Rugi (sword) =

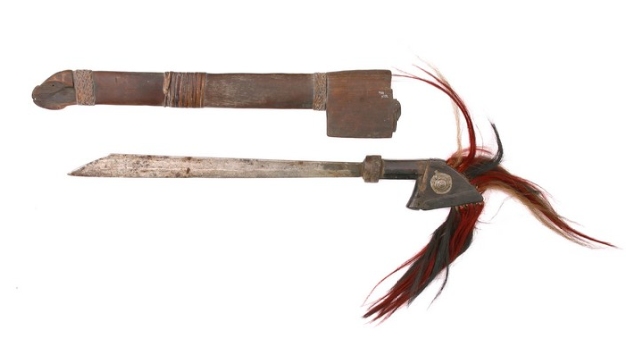
- A Rugi sword from Alor Island, pre-1890
- Type: Klewang sword
- Place of origin: Indonesia (Wetar, Alor Island)

Service history
- Used by: Alorese, Wetarese

Specifications
- Length: approximately 66 cm (26 in) blade
- Blade type: Single edge
- Hilt type: Wood, horse or goat hair
- Scabbard/sheath: Wood

Rugi is a traditional sword originating from Wetar and Alor Island, Indonesia. It is also referred to as Rugi Glamang.

== Description ==
The Rugi has a straight blade. The blade widens from the hilt to the point and the spine of the blade is slightly convex. The cutting edge is also slightly convexly curved and becomes bulbous in the middle area. This place is shaped in a slight curve. The hilt is usually made of wood and has no guard. It is wrapped with plant fibers in the handle area to provide better grip when gripping. The pommel is made in a triangle shape and has a large, carved eye that has mythological significance. The pommel is usually decorated on two sides with tufts of horse or goat hair. The scabbards are made of wood and are flat. In the local area they are slightly bent and widened into a square.

== See also ==
- Belida (sword)
- Hemola
- Moso (sword)
