= Sikin Panyang =

Sikin Panjang
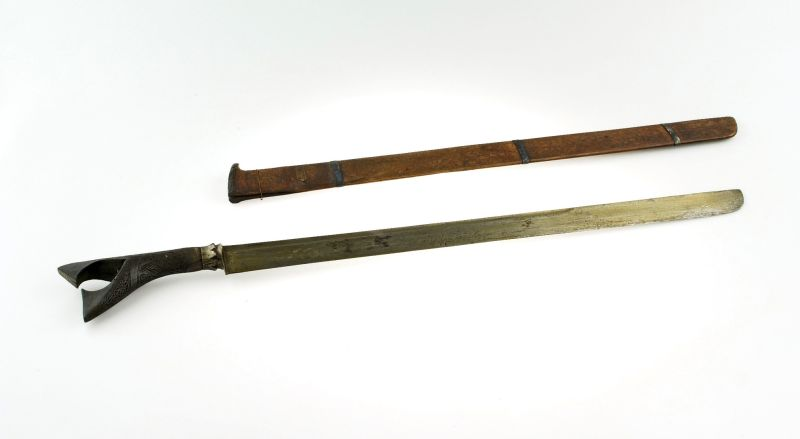
- A Sikin Panjang, pre-1903.
- Type: Klewang sword
- Place of origin: Indonesia (Aceh & North Sumatra)

Service history
- Used by: Alas people, Acehnese people, Gayo people
- Wars: Aceh War (1873–1914)

Specifications
- Length: 70–80 cm (28–31 in)
- Blade type: Hollow grind, single edge
- Hilt type: Horn
- Scabbard/sheath: Wood.

Sikin Panjang (also known as Sikin Panyang, Gloepak Sikin, Glupak Sikin, Jekinpandjang, Loedjoe Aceh, Loedjoe Atjeh, Loedjoe Naru, Ludju Naru, Narumo, Sekin Panjang, Sekin Pandjang, Sekin Panjang Meutatah, or Thikin Panjang) is a sword originated from northern Sumatra, Indonesia.

== History ==
The Sikin Panjang is the most popular fighting weapon of the inhabitants of northern Sumatra. In the early years of the Aceh War against the Dutch (which began in 1873 and lasted for over thirty years) many Sikins were made, especially prior to 1879 when a start was made with disarmament of the population. It is a version of Klewang. The spread of the Sikin Panjang was limited to Sumatra, and especially to Aceh and Gayo (where the term Luju Naru is used), but also in Alas (where it is named Andar) and to a lesser degree in the Batak area. Another typical sword in this region is the Balato of the Nias people.

During the Aceh Sultanate period, the Panglima Prang (warlord) ranking titles were given. The Sikin Panjang and Rencong which the Panglima Prang receives from the Ulubalang (district chief) on his appointment, he must return to the Ulubalang again if he should ever embrace the cause of an enemy of the Ulubalang. Person of position or those who are going on a journey carry in addition the Sikin Panjang which is the common weapon used in fighting. It is of uniform width from end to end, and placed in a sheath.

== Description ==
The Sikin Panjang is a straight, single edged sword. The sword comes with its sheath, and carried at the waist. Parts of the Sikin Panjang includes the wilah (blade), hulu (handle), and sarung (sheath). The back and the edge of the blade are parallel making it a very straight sword. The blade also has a hollow ground edge throughout the blade. The hilt is shaped like the letter Y, with its length up to 25 cm (9.8 in). The moderate overall length of the sword is approximately 70–79 cm (28–31 in). The blade of the sword is usually made of pamor (pattern welding or Damascus) steel.

== See also ==
- Amanremu
