= Piso Halasan =

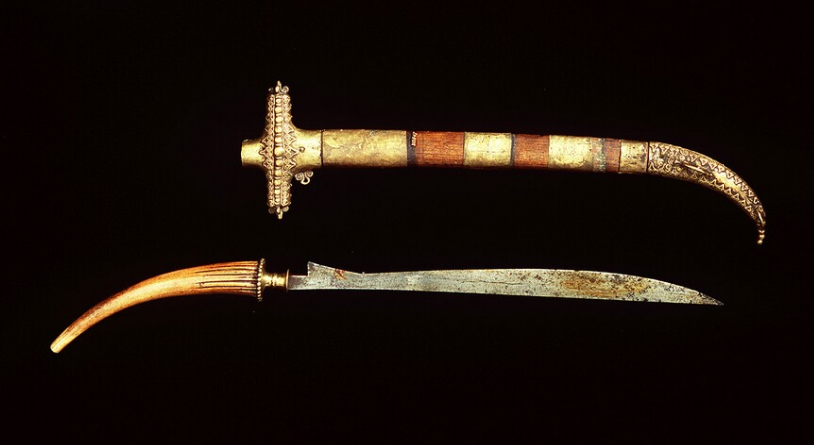
- A Piso Halasan or Engkat from North Sumatra.
- Type: Sword
- Place of origin: Indonesia (North Sumatra)

Service history
- Used by: Batak people

Specifications
- Length: 65–100 cm (26–39 in)
- Blade type: Single edge
- Hilt type: Deer horn, antelope horn, ivory
- Scabbard/sheath: Wood

A Piso Halasan (also known as an Eccat, Ekkat, Engkat, or Piso Eccat) is a traditional sword of the Batak people from North Tapanuli Regency, North Sumatra, Indonesia.

== Description ==
A Piso Halasan is typically a sword with a hilt made of deer horn or antelope horn, although horn-shaped hilts of cast metal are also found. The blade is made of a mixture of several kinds of metal and is used as a deadly weapon in battles. It has a straight back and a narrow point. Its broadest part is near the point, and there is a notch near the hilt. The scabbard is broader at the top and usually terminates at the bottom in a narrow curved point, partly or totally covered with metal. The sword may be adorned with engravings and forged with metals that include poisons.

== Cultural ==
Batak land (North Sumatra) consisted of many kingdoms which were governed by raja (kings or leaders). Piso Halasan was a symbol of power for the kings and leaders in Batak land. Piso Halasan can be translated as The Sword of Happiness, the sword was created to enable the master of the sword to bring happiness to the people they rule. Piso Halasan was a very dangerous weapon and often used in battle. Poison was often applied to the edge of the blade when it was used for battle. Only rich rajas and other dignitaries possessed a Piso Halasan with an ivory hilt, known as a Piso Gading.

== See also ==
- Rudus
- Balato (sword)
