= Surik (sword) =

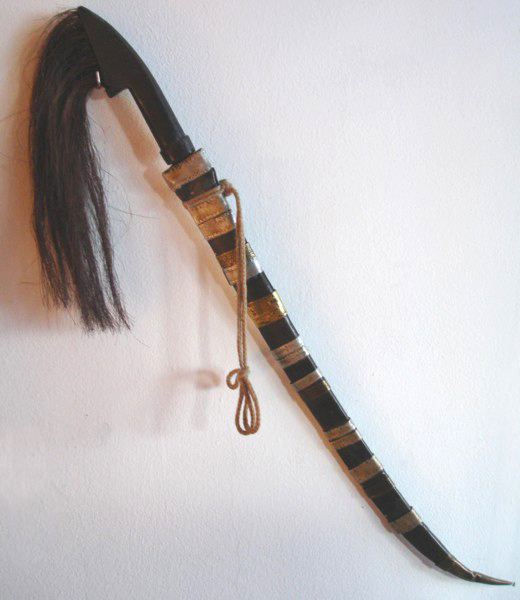
- A surik from Maubisse, East Timor.
- Type: Sword
- Place of origin: Indonesia (West Timor, Nusa Tenggara, Jambi, North Sumatra, West Sumatra) and Timor Leste

Service history
- Used by: Timorese, Batak

Specifications
- Blade type: Single edge
- Hilt type: Water buffalo horn
- Scabbard/sheath: Wood

The surik is a traditional sword native to the island of Timor (West Timor, Indonesia and Timor Leste) or Nusa Tenggara in wider extent, as well as Sumatra (Jambi, North Sumatra, West Sumatra). The first coat of arms of East Timor depicted crossed suriks.

== Description ==
The surik has a single edge blade. The width of the blade narrows from the base down to the tip. Most of the handle is made from horn, and is decorated with tassels to look tough. Goat's hair or horse's hair is attached to the handle. Carving an eye at the center of the handle is meant to strengthen its supernatural power. The sheath of this sword is made of wood.

A surik sword used along with a long curved shield is called surik samara.

== Cultural ==
For the Belu people of Nusa Tenggara, the surik is considered as a sacred sword. Its supposed supernatural abilities depend on the person who wield the sword; it is believed by the people that no commoner can touch the surik, or the else the sword would turn against that person. Because of that, the community will take counsel to determine who should wield the surik before going to war.

The surik is also used in traditional dance in Timor island called Tari Surik Laleok, which is meant to portray the local warrior's customs. suriks were also worn by the Meos, the foremost fighters, and usually also the most successful head-hunters of the village.

In cases where a dispute is to be settled between two parties in places like Maubara and Ermera, East Timor are known as nahe no lulun biti (to open and close the mat) or tula mesa leten (to put on the table). Once it is decided which party are at fault, a form of compensation is made by a payment of money or valuable objects; and the surik in this case is also accepted.

Surik also refers to another sword used by the Batak people of North Sumatra, as well in other provinces such as West Sumatra and Jambi in Indonesia.

== See also ==
- Klewang
