= Belida (sword) =

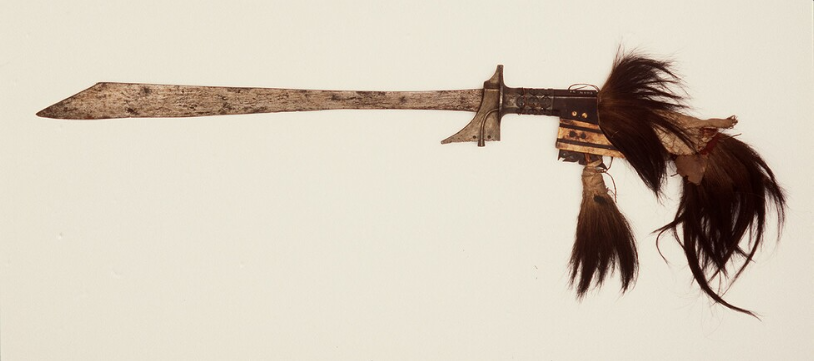
- A Belida sword from East Flores Regency, pre-1861.
- Type: Klewang sword
- Place of origin: Indonesia (Flores)

Service history
- Used by: Solorese and Larantukans

Specifications
- Length: approximately 47–54 cm (19–21 in)
- Blade type: Single edge
- Hilt type: Wood, feathers
- Scabbard/sheath: Palm, cotton, bamboo, goat hair

The Belida sword is a weapon from Flores, Indonesia.

== Description ==
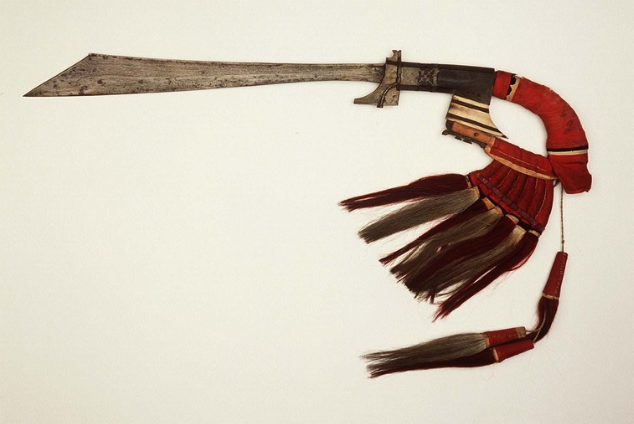

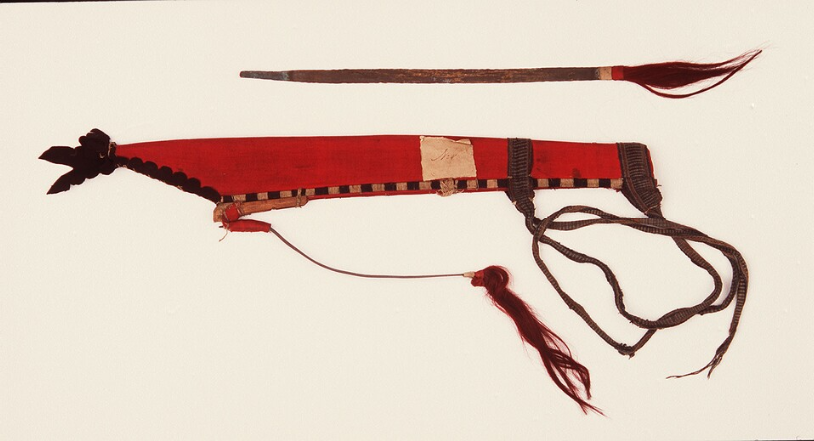
- A Belapi sword, a Belida sword variant with full hand guard (top) and a Belida sheath (bottom).

The Belida sword has a slightly curved, single-edged blade. The blades come in two different basic shapes.

- The blade is narrow at the hilt and widens towards the point. At the curve area, the blade is slightly bulbous. The cutting edge is shorter than the spine of the blade. The place is cut off at an angle.
- The blade is of constant width from hilt to the curvature. Shortly before the curve area, the blade widens a bit. Two thirds of the blade are straight, the remaining third is slightly curved towards the spine of the blade. The curvature is slightly rounded, resembling the curvature of European sabers.

The handle is made of wood and has a curved design in the butt-end area. It is large enough to be wielded with both hands. It is made wider at the transition to the blade and has a protruding widening (see info box image). The guard and the ferrule are made of metal and are broadened towards the cutting edge. Some versions are decorated with bird feathers on the hilt and pommel. The Belida is used by ethnic groups from Indonesia.

== See also ==
- Hemola
- Moso (sword)
- Rugi (sword)
