= Amanremu =

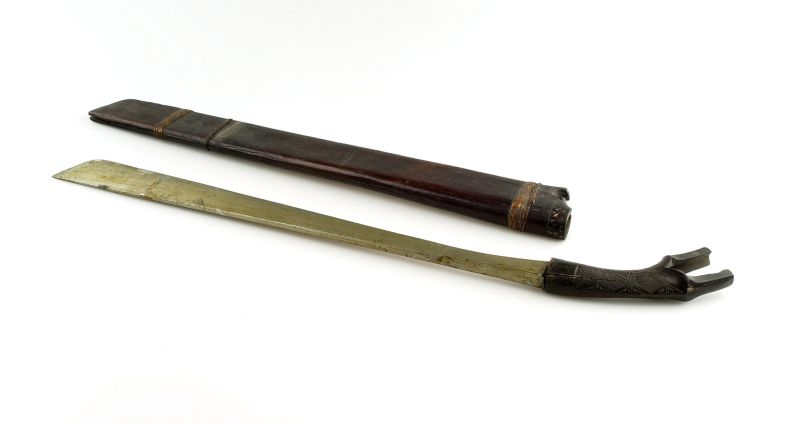
- Pre-1918 Amanremu
- Type: Cutlass-Machete Klewang
- Place of origin: Indonesia (North Sumatra)

Service history
- Used by: Batak (Pakpak people), Gayonese

Specifications
- Length: 70-80 cm
- Blade type: Single edge, flat grind
- Hilt type: Wood, horn, sheet metal
- Scabbard/sheath: Wood, horn, sheet metal, rattan

The Amanremu (also referred to as Parang Amanremu, Amanremoe, Amaremoe, Meremoe, Mermo, Semaremoe, Samaremoe or Samaremu) is a sword from North Sumatra, Indonesia.

== Description ==
The Amanremu has a straight, single edged blade with a bulbous curve near the tip. The blade is from the handle to tip, where its thickness narrows down and its width widens toward the tip with a bulbous shape near the end. The center of gravity of the blade lies at the tip of it to enhance the impact power. The tip is rounded. The blade has neither middle ridge nor hollow ground. The handle has no guard. It is made of wood or horn and is usually fork-shaped at the handle butt. There are different types of handles that are distinct depending on the place where it is made or the purpose of its usage. The sheath are made of wood, which is worked from two halves. The two halves are then held together with rattan cords or with thin strips of sheet metal. The Amanremu is a version of the parang.

== See also ==
- Sikin Panyang
