= Moso (sword) =

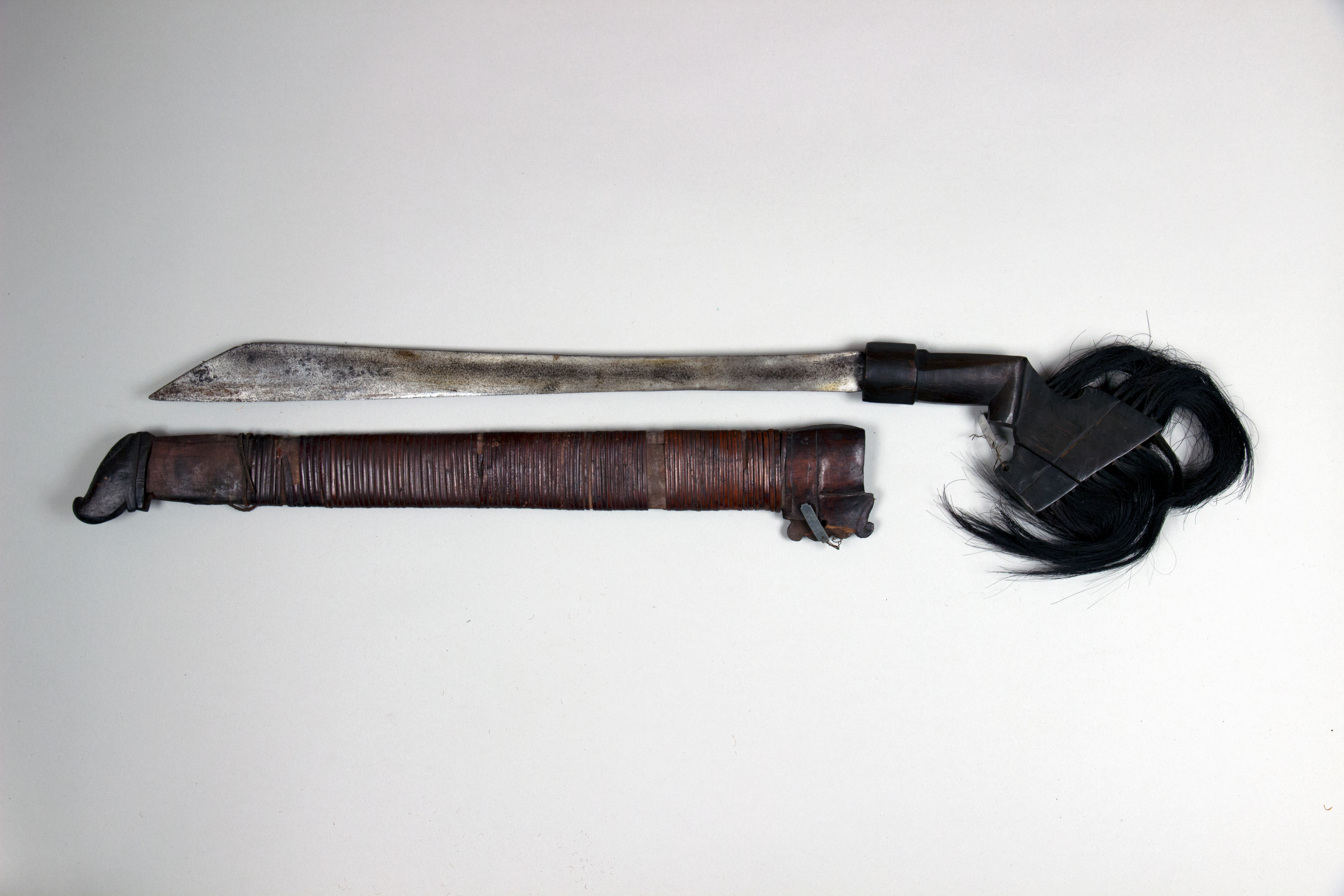
- A Moso sword from Wetar, circa 18th–19th century.
- Type: Klewang sword
- Place of origin: Indonesia (Sulawesi and Alor Archipelago)

Specifications
- Length: approximately 65 cm (26 in)
- Blade type: Single edge, convex grind
- Hilt type: Wood, hair
- Scabbard/sheath: Wood, rattan

The Moso is a sword found throughout the Alor Archipelago up to Sulawesi, Indonesia.

== Description ==
The Moso has a straight, single-edged blade that is only slightly curved locally. The blade widens from the hilt to the tip. It has one or usually three narrow hollow grinds that run directly below the spine of the blade. The cutting edge becomes slightly bulbous towards the tip-end. The end of the tip is cut off at an angle, the back of the blade is shorter than the cutting edge.

The hilt is made of wood and has no guard. The pommel is triangular and decorated with a carved eye in the center that has mythological significance. The sides of the pommel are decorated with horse or goat hair is called qava umudi in the Blagar language.

The scabbard is made of wood, featuring a base carved into a hook shape and an elaborately crafted, widened opening.

== See also ==
- Belida (sword)
- Hemola
- Rugi (sword)
