= Klewang =

Bladed weapons of the Malay archipelago

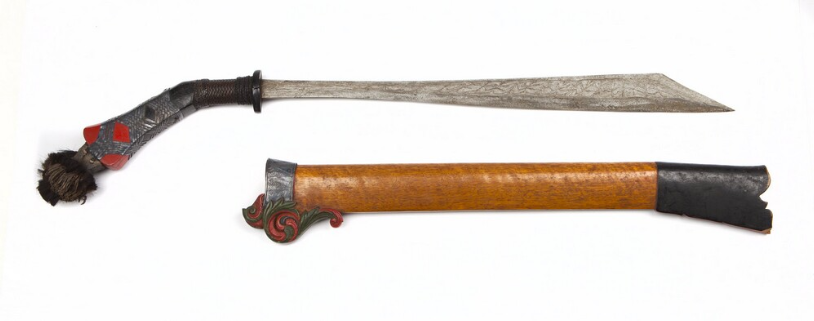
- This sword with its blade from Buton, features a typical type of klewang, was obtained from South Kalimantan, pre-1890.
- Type: Cutlass, Sabre
- Place of origin: Malay Archipelago

Service history
- Wars: Aceh War (1873–1904); Indonesian National Revolution (1945–1949)

Specifications
- Length: 40–70 cm (16–28 in)
- Blade type: Single edge, slight convex grind
- Hilt type: Water buffalo horn, wood
- Scabbard/sheath: Wood

The klewang or kelewang is a category of traditional single-edged sword that can be found throughout the Malay Archipelago. Usually it is shorter than a pedang (sword) but longer than a golok (machete). There are straight bladed types, but most are curved.

== History ==
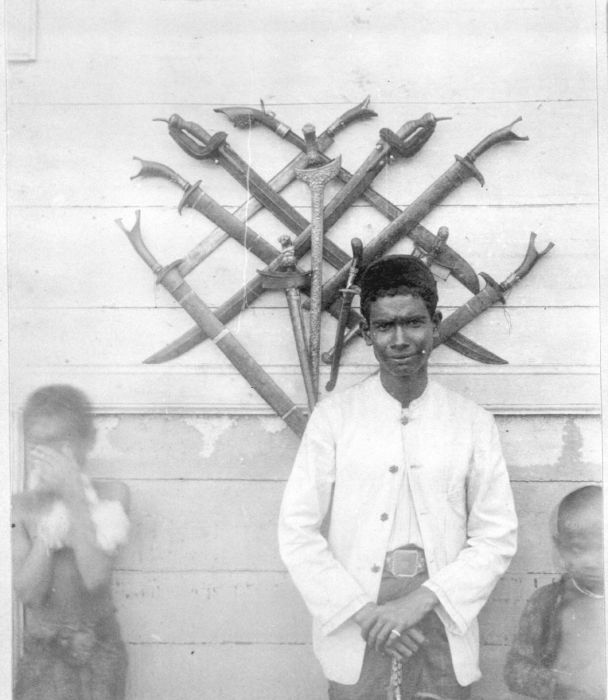
An Acehnese collection of Kris (hung vertically) and Klewang (hung diagonally) during the Dutch colonial period, c. 1893–95.

The Kelantanese klewang is believed to be as old as the parang, became a distinct weapon by the late 18th century. In the 19th century, Kelantanese men would wear the Kelantantese klewang behind their sarong with the blade protruding out.

During the Aceh War the Acehnese klewang proved very effective in close quarters combat against the sabre-wielding Dutch troops and the Royal Netherlands East Indies Army. Mobile troops armed with carbines and klewang succeeded in suppressing Aceh resistance where traditional infantry with rifle and bayonet had failed. The Dutch klewang was developed at the end of the 19th century, because firearms and also traditional swords were not always reliable at that time, especially in the jungle. 'A klewang in the right-hand fist never refuses', it was said.

From 1898 until the 1960s the Royal Dutch East Indies Army, Royal Dutch Army, Royal Dutch Navy and Dutch police used the militarised version of the klewang. These military versions were shortened sabres completely by European design, and better suited for close quarter fighting and jungle warfare. Officially the weapon was named the Marechaussee-sabre but the name klewang was more popular and later on also used as an official model.

Even from the time after Aceh was pacified by the Dutch to the 1930s and right through World War II, lone wolf Acehnese without generals would still attack Europeans in hopes of getting martyred themselves and attaining paradise. Weapons used in such cases were usually klewang, if not the Rencong. The klewang was also used by the U.S. Army during World War II in the Pacific.

== Ceremonial use ==
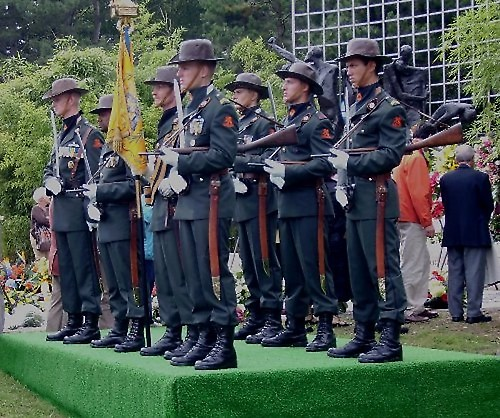
Colour Guard Regiment "van Heutsz".

In the Royal Netherlands Army the klewang is still used as a ceremonial weapon by the colour guard of the Regiment van Heutsz which took over the traditions of the Royal Netherlands East Indies Army, where the klewang was historically used as a side arm. The Royal Constibulary or Koninklijke Marechaussee and the Midshipmen of the Royal Dutch Navy also carries the Klewang in ceremonies and parades.

== Description ==
The klewang features a single-edge blade with a protruding notch near its tip. In size, weight and shape it is halfway between the golok and the kampilan. The style of the klewang differs between the various cultures of Indonesia. Blades range from 15 to 30 inches (38 to 76 cm) in length and may be straight or slightly curved. It is carried for show by followers of chiefs, or taken on expeditions to market or nightly walks in the villages. It is worn without a sheath although there are sheathed varieties.

In Malaysia, the klewang may be found in various states. The Kelantanese klewang features a curve blade with a spike, and was worn by men in the 19th century at the back of the sarong with the blade protruding.

== Geographical varieties ==
=== Aceh ===
- Amanremu
- Co Jang
- Ladieng
- Sikin Panyang

=== Sulawesi ===
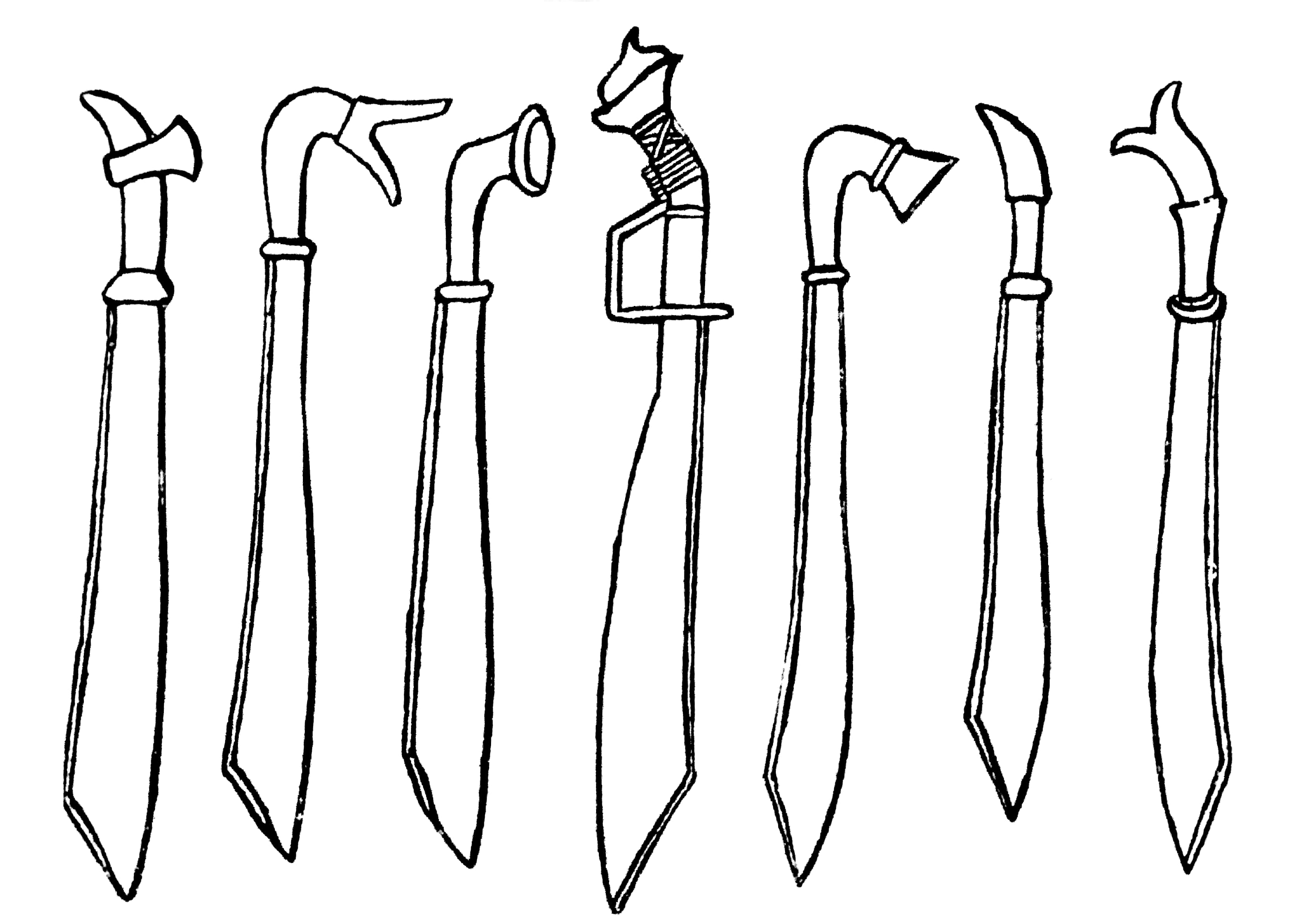
Various klewangs from Sulawesi:

1	Dua Lalan
2	Sumara
3	Guma Tadulako / Tonolampa

4	Báde/Pade Ta'awu
5	Penai, Torajan style
6	Unidentified klewang

7	Penai, eastern and southeastern Sulawesi style

=== Timor ===
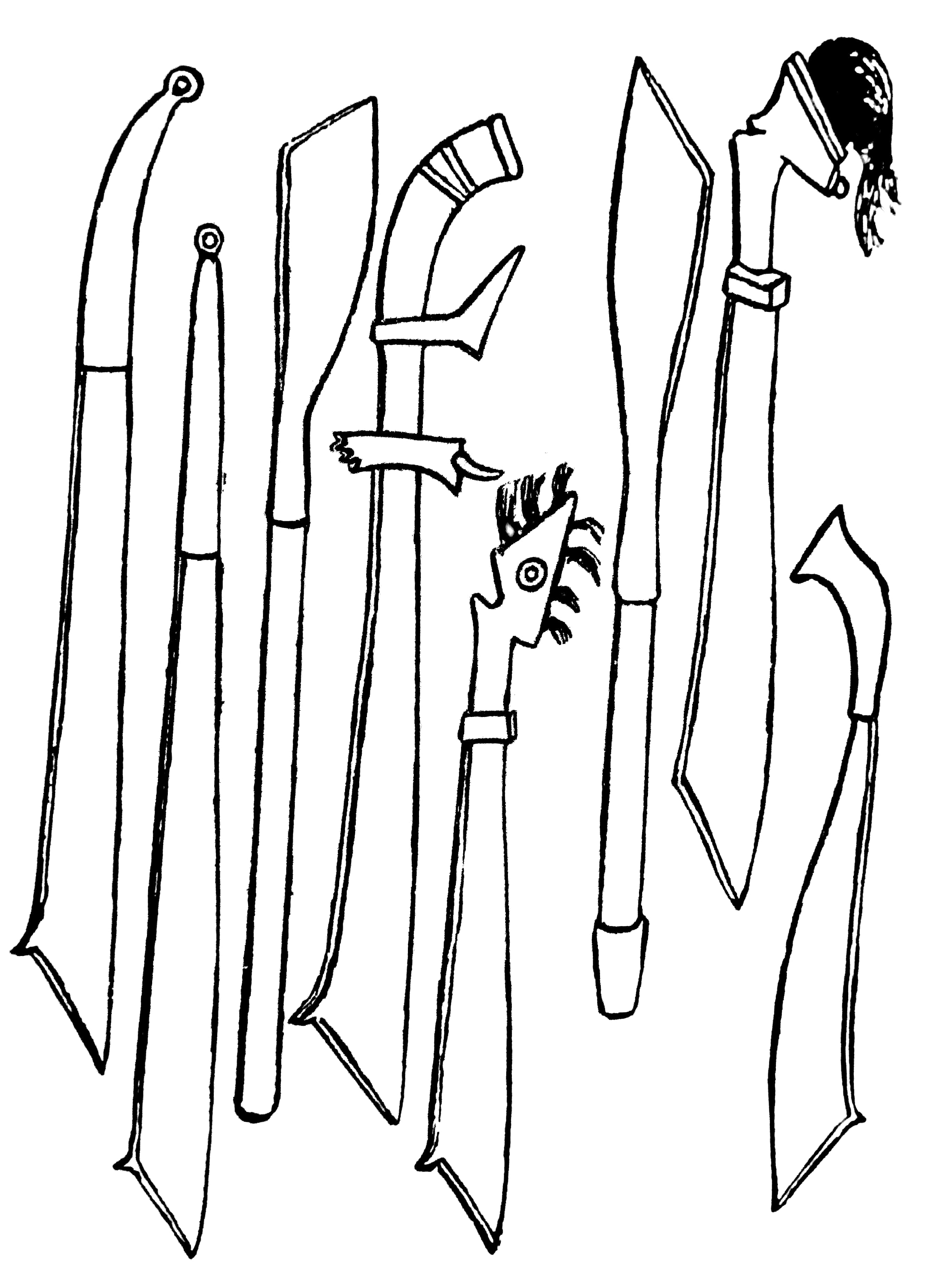
Various klewangs from Timor:

1	Topo, Sikka style
2	Topo, unknown Flores style
3	Péda (?)

4	Belida
5	Suni
6	Toa/Topo stick sword

7	Moso of Alor Island or Opi of Timor
8	Tulie, Wemale style of Seram

=== Others ===
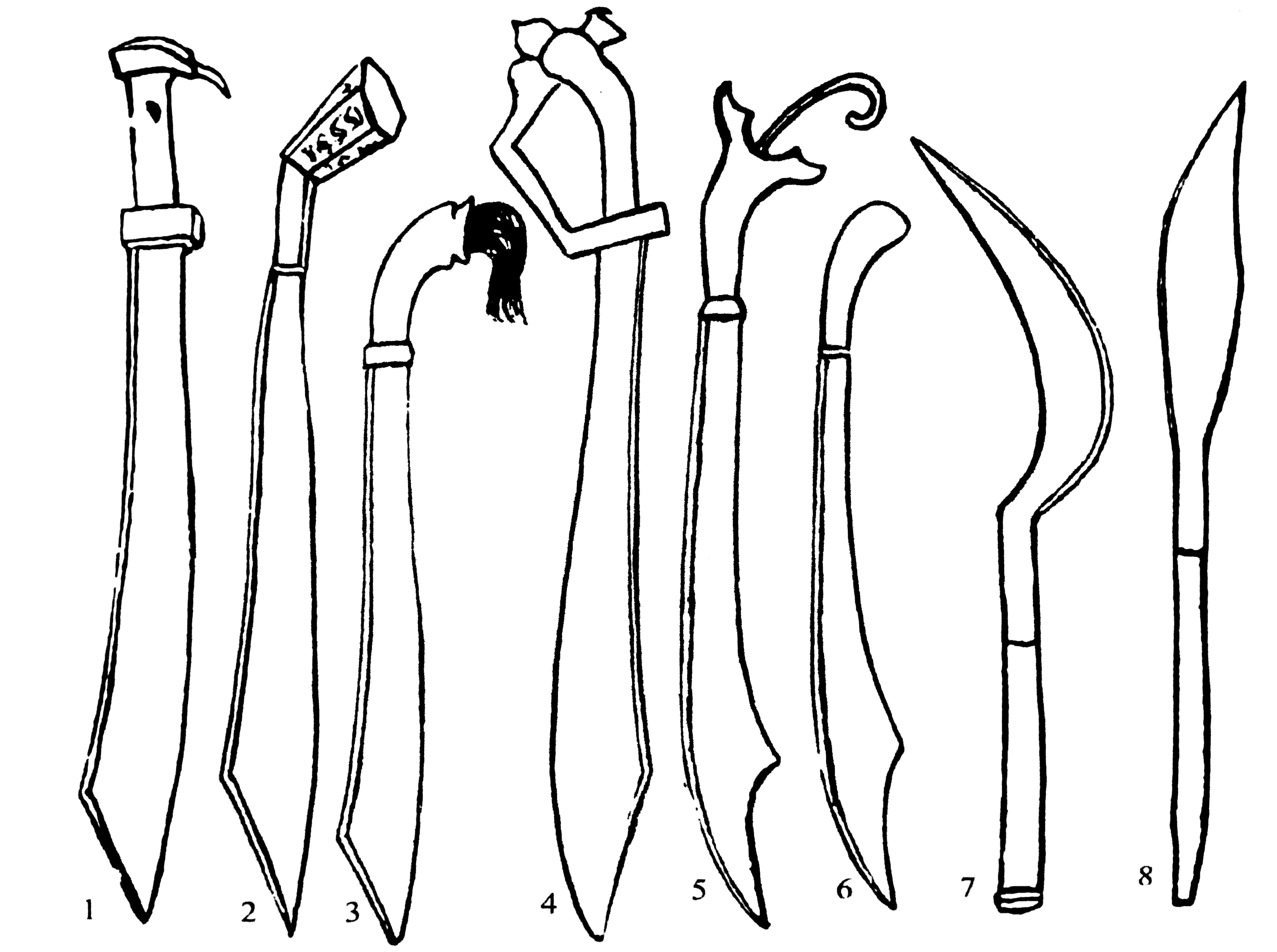
Other variety of klewangs:

1	Klewang from Banda Besar or Seram
2	Seruk from Maluku Islands
3	Kra Péeté from Yamdena

4	Unidentified klewang
5	Gari from Nias
6	Balato, northern Nias style

7	Arit
8	Toa stick knife from Solor

== See also ==
- Kampilan
- Kalis
- Parang (knife)
- Surik (sword)
- Pirah
