= List of natural disasters in Indonesia =

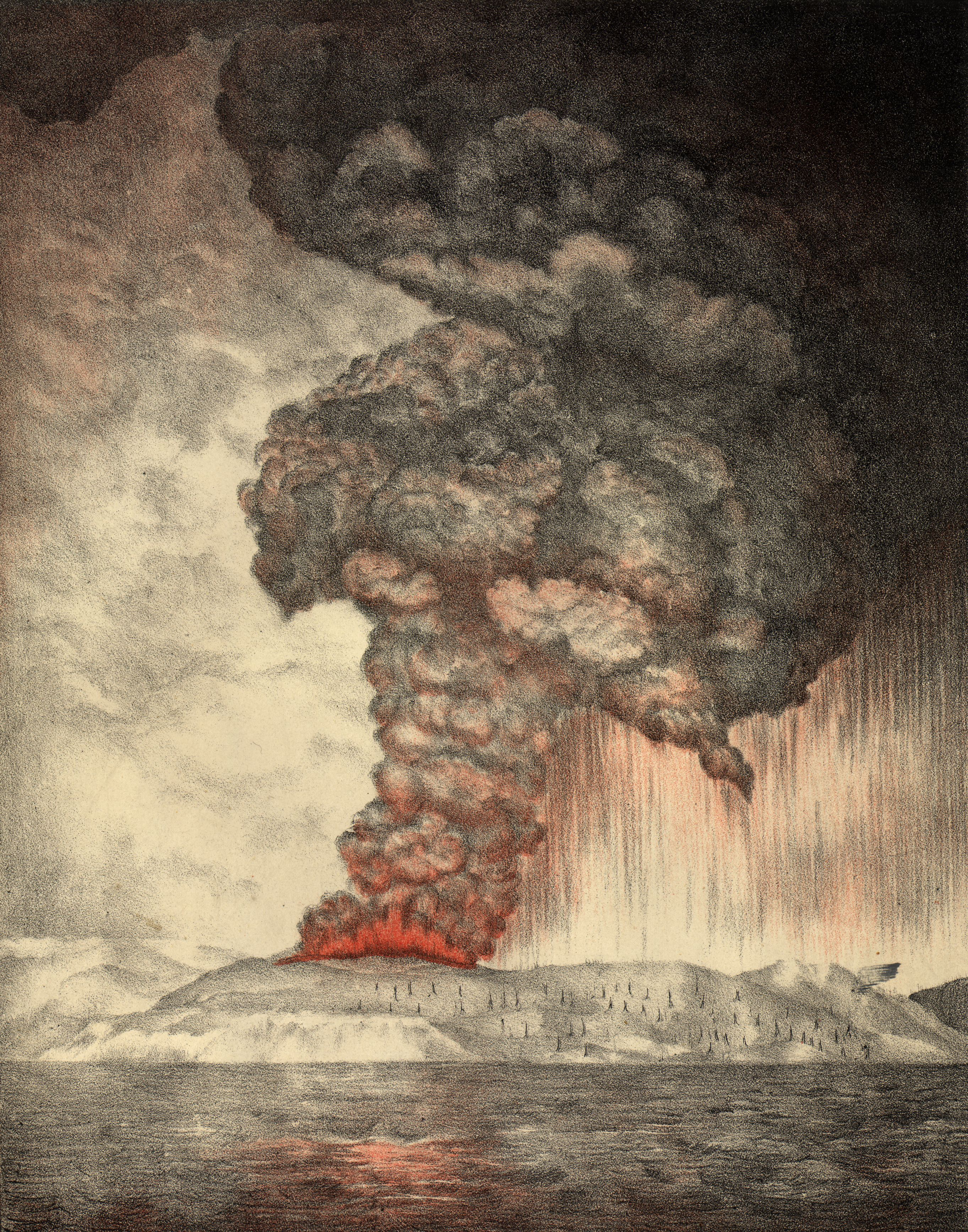
Painting of Eruption of Krakatoa

Natural disasters in Indonesia can usefully be divided into major disasters, medium level disasters, and lesser disasters which although causing less damage are very common across Indonesia. These can conveniently be considered as macro, mezzo, and micro events. Policies to respond deal with each of these different types of disasters.

The official website of the Indonesian National Disaster Mitigation Agency (Badan Nasional Penanggulangan Bencana) provides frequent updates on disasters occurring in Indonesia.

== Major natural disasters with widespread loss of life ==
The following is a list of main natural disasters that have occurred in Indonesia during recent history which have led to major loss of life (broadly defined here as over 500 deaths in the disaster).

Year	Month	Event	Place	Main area	Death toll	Displaced	Damages
1257		Huge eruption of Rinjani	Lombok	West Nusa Tenggara	Huge eruption (1)		
1586		Mount Kelud	Blitar	East Java	10,000 est		
1815	Apr	Huge eruption of Tambora	Sumbawa	East Nusa Tenggara	11,000 est (2)		
1815	Nov	Earthquake and tsunami	Singaraja and Surabaya	Bali and East Java	>11,400		
1822	Oct	Galunggung	West Java	West Java	4,010		
1833	Nov	Sumatra earthquake and tsunami	West Sumatra	West Sumatra and Bengkulu	numerous		
1861	Feb	Sumatra earthquake	North Sumatra	Nias area	2,000 est (3)		
1883	Aug	Eruption of Krakatoa	Sunda Strait	West Java and Lampung	36,417		
1892	Jun	Mount Awu eruption	North Sulawesi	North Sulawesi	1,530 est		
1899	Sep	Seram earthquake and tsunami	Seram Island	Maluku province	3,864		
1917	Jan	Bali earthquake	Bali	Bali and Lombok	1,500		
1919	May	Kelud eruption	Blitar	East Java	>5,000		
1926	June	Papua earthquake	Papua	Papua and Papua New Guinea	>5,000 (4)		
1930	Nov	Merapi eruption	Yogyakarta	Yogyakarta and Central Java	>1,300		
1963	Mar	Agung eruption	Bali	Bali	2,000 est		
1973	Apr	Flores Cyclone	Flores	East Nusa Tenggara	1,650-1,653		
1976	June	Papua earthquake	Papua	Papua	5,000		
1976	July	Bali earthquake	Buleleng	Bali	573		
1992	Dec	Flores earthquake	Flores	East Nusa Tenggara	2,500		
2004	Dec	Aceh & Nias tsunami	Aceh and Nias	Aceh and North Sumatra	170,000 (5)	500,000+	
2005	Mar	Nias earthquake	Nias	North Sumatra	1,300		
2006	May	Yogyakarta earthquake	Bantul	Yogyakarta	5,782	600,000-699,295	Rp29.1 trillion ($3.1 billion)
2006	July	Pangandaran earthquake	Pangandaran	West Java and Central Java	660 est		$44.7 million
2009	Sep	Padang earthquake	Padang	West Sumatra	1,115		
2018	Aug	Lombok earthquake	North Lombok	Lombok	564		Rp8.8 trillion ($607 million)
2018	Sep	Palu earthquake and tsunami	Palu	Central Sulawesi	4,340 (6)		Rp24.6 trillion ($1.71 billion)
2022	Nov	Cianjur earthquake	Cianjur	West Java	635		Rp4 trillion ($256 million)
2025	Nov	Cyclone Senyar	Northern Sumatra	Aceh, North Sumatra, and West Sumatra	>1,200 (7)	1.2 million	Rp68.7 trillion ($4.13 billion)

(1) Total death toll unknown. The eruption is believed to have had a worldwide impact.
(2) This is the estimated death toll from the direct impact of the eruption. A total of perhaps 70,000 people are estimated to have died from starvation and disease in the area in the months following the eruption. See also 1815 eruption of Mount Tambora.
(3) "Some thousands" are reported to have died.
(4) Source: MCEER, University of Buffalo, The State University of New York, Major Indonesian Earthquakes of the 20th Century, accessed 29 December 2013.
(5) This is the estimated death toll in Indonesia. An estimated 60,000 more people died in other countries surrounding the Indian Ocean, especially in Sri Lanka.
(6) The original official death toll was around 2,200. However several thousands more, perhaps 4,000 or more, were buried in a major mudslide during the earthquake. It has therefore been difficult to compile a reliable estimate of the final toll. As of February 2019, it was estimated that over 4,300 died.
(7) Only counting the number of deaths in Indonesia. At least 300 more deaths were recorded in Thailand and Malaysia.

== Medium level natural disasters ==
In addition to the disasters listed in the table above, there are a large number of natural disasters in Indonesia which cause medium levels of loss of life (here defined, roughly, as between 50 and 500 deaths) or which give rise to large numbers of internally displaced refugees, sometimes for some months or more. Some recent examples of these include the following.

Year	Month	Event	Place	Main area	Death toll	Evacuees (estimates)
1965	Jan	Sanana earthquake	Sanana Island	Maluku Islands	71	n.a.
1966	Apr	Kelud eruption	Blitar	East Java	>210	n.a.
1968	Aug	Sulawesi earthquake	North Luwu Regency	Sulawesi	>200	n.a.
1979	Feb	Dieng Plateau eruption	Dieng Plateau	Central Java	149	n.a.
1981	Jan	Irian Jaya earthquake	Puncak Jaya area	Papua (province)	>300	n.a.
1982	Apr	Eruption of Mt Galunggung	Garut	West Java	72	62,000
1990	Feb	Widespread floods	Semarang and regions	Central Java	169	approx 20,000
1994	Feb	Lampung earthquake	Lampung	Sumatra	approx 200	> 2,000 injuries
1997	Sep	Indonesian forest fires	Kalimantan	Sumatra & Borneo	240	?
2000	June	Enggano earthquake	Bengkulu	Sumatra	>100	> 10,000 houses seriously damaged
2006	Jan	Sijeruk landslide	Banjarnegara Regency	Central Java	240	?
2006	May	Sidoarjo mud flow	Sidoarjo Regency	East Java	n.a.	approx 40,000
2007	Oct	Kelud eruption	Blitar	East Java	n.a.	30,000
2009	Sep	West Java earthquake	Cianjur and Tasikmalaya	West Java	approx 80	approx 210,000
2010	Nov	Merapi eruption	South of Mount Merapi	Yogyakarta & Central Java	353	350,000
2010	Aug	Sinabung eruption	Karo Regency	North Sumatra	1	30,000
2010	Oct	Wasior floods	Wasior	West Papua	145	7,900
2010	Oct	Mentawai earthquake and tsunami	Mentawai Islands	West Sumatra	440	20,000
2014	Feb	Sinabung eruption	Karo Regency	North Sumatra	16	over 30,000
2014	Dec	Karangkobar landslide	Banjarnegara Regency	Central Java	108	2,038
2016	Dec	Pidie Jaya earthquake	Pidie Jaya Regency	Aceh	approx 100	over 45,000 displaced
2018	Dec	2018 Sunda Strait tsunami	Sunda Strait	Banten and Lampung	437	over 46,000
2019	Jan	2019 South Sulawesi floods	South Sulawesi	Gowa Regency and Makassar	68	?
2019	Mar	2019 Jayapura flood and landslide	Jayapura	Papua (province)	113	11,000
2021	Jan	2021 West Sulawesi earthquake	Mamuju Regency	West Sulawesi	108	20,000*
2021	Apr	Cyclone Seroja	East Flores Regency	East Nusa Tenggara	183	8,000+
2021	Dec	2021 Semeru eruption	Malang, Lumajang	East Java	57	10,655

Note. Estimates of the numbers of evacuees can vary considerably in short periods of time. In some cases large numbers of people move away from a threatened area but return to their homes as soon as possible. It is often the case in Indonesia that people are reluctant to move away from their homes, or stay away long, because of worries about loss of property through theft and because of the need to look after local farms and cattle. Figures listed here are generally the peak numbers although sometimes different sources provide different estimates.

== Lesser natural disasters ==
There is a large number of smaller natural disasters in Indonesia each year which often lead to deaths of 10 or 20 people or more. For example, landslides (tanah longsor) are very common in upland areas, especially during the rainy season, and cause much local damage and deaths.

Flooding is also a regular problem across many parts of Indonesia. The capital city Jakarta is subject to severe floods from time to time which usually cause some loss of life and significant damage to public and commercial infrastructure. In January 2014, for example, over 20 people lost their lives during widespread flooding and at one stage over 60,000 citizens were temporarily housed in nearly 250 evaluation shelters across the city.

In many rural areas, local flooding is very common and brings loss of life as well as much local inconvenience to economic and community life. Recent examples of these sorts of problems at the regional level include:

- A landslide at a resort in Pacet near Mojokerto in East Java in 2002 when over 30 people died.
- A landslide in Agam Regency in West Sumatra in January 2013 which left 20 people dead.
- A series of landslides and floods in Manado in North Sulawesi in February 2013 which caused much damage and killed at least 17 people.
- A landslide in West Bandung Regency in West Java in March 2013 in which 17 people were killed
- Flash floods and landslides in Manado in North Sulawesi in January 2014 in which at least 16 people died and 40,000 were evacuated. Around 1,000 homes were flooded; the government allocated Rp 3.3 billion (almost $300,000) for assistance.
- A 6.4-magnitude earthquake in late July 2018 killed at least 16 people, and injured around over 350, in Lombok in Eastern Indonesia.
- Floods in Greater Jakarta (Jabodetabek) on 1–3 January 2020 killed at least 48 people, and more than 31,000 people were evacuated. Floods occur because of rain that occurred from 31 December 2019 to 1 January 2020.

== National outlook ==
2014

According to the National Disaster Mitigation Agency (BNPB, or Badan Nasional Penanggulanan Bencana), as many as 566 people were killed by natural disasters and displaced over 2.6 million in Indonesia in 2014. Almost all of the disasters were classified as hydro-meteorological events. Tornadoes were the most common natural disaster (496 events) followed by floods (458 events) and landslides (413 events). Landslides caused the most deaths estimated at 343 people.

== See also ==
- Lists of disasters in Indonesia
- List of earthquakes in Indonesia
- Indonesian tsunami, list of
- List of wildfires in Indonesia
