= 2010 Sumatra earthquake =

In 2010, there were several earthquakes that affected Sumatra in Indonesia:

- 2010 Banyak Islands earthquake
- 2010 Mentawai earthquake and tsunami

== See also ==
- List of earthquakes in Indonesia
