= Aceh earthquake =

Aceh earthquake may refer to:

- 2012 Aceh earthquake, magnitude 8.6 and 8.2 M_{w} undersea earthquakes that struck near the Indonesian province of Aceh on April 11, 2012
- 2013 Aceh earthquake, magnitude 6.1 earthquake that struck the province of Aceh on the Indonesian island of Sumatra on July 2, 2013
- 2016 Aceh earthquake, magnitude 6.5 earthquake that struck the regency of Bireun, Pidie, and Pidie Jaya of Aceh on December 7, 2016

== See also ==
- List of earthquakes in Indonesia
