= 2010 Indonesia earthquake =

There have been three major earthquakes near Indonesia in 2010:

- 2010 Banyak Islands earthquake
- 2010 Mentawai earthquake and tsunami

== See also ==
- List of earthquakes in Indonesia
