= 1699 Java earthquake =

Earthquake in the Dutch East Indies (present-day Indonesia)

- Location within Java Location within Indonesia
- Local date: January 5, 1699
- Local time: Early morning
- Magnitude: 7.4–8.0 M_{w}
- Epicenter: 6.078°S 105.913°E
- Type: Intraslab
- Areas affected: Java, Sumatra
- Max. intensity: MMI IX (Violent)
- Landslides: Yes
- Casualties: >128 dead

On the morning of January 5, 1699, a violent earthquake rocked the then Dutch East Indies city of Batavia on the island of Java, now known as the Indonesian capital city of Jakarta. Dutch accounts of the event described the earthquake as being "so heavy and strong" and beyond comparable to other known earthquakes. This event was so large that it was felt throughout west Java, and southern Sumatra.

== Tectonic setting ==
The Indonesian islands of Java, Sumatra and Lesser Sunda chain lie along a destructive plate boundary where the Australian plate meets the Sunda plate. The plates converge, with the Australian plate being much denser as it is oceanic lithosphere, subducting beneath the less dense Sunda plate. Subduction is responsible for the large megathrust earthquakes along the west coast of Sumatra and south coast of Java. It also plays a significant role in the volcanic activity on the islands. However, intraplate earthquakes can also occur as the Australian plate deforms when it is subducting; faults within the downgoing slab may result in intermediate-depth events that are also considerably large.

== Damage and casualties ==
At least 28 people in Batavia were fatally wounded and 49 stone-constructed structures collapsed as a result of the earthquake. Some 21 homes and 29 barns were also obliterated. Almost every home situated in the city suffered some extent of damage. The earthquake uprooted and toppled many trees, blocking waterways and choking river systems. At Mount Salak, a volcano on the island of Java, the violent tremors triggered landslides and debris masses, blocking rivers and causing floods. The combination of earth and vegetation produced a debris flow that passed through the Ci Liwung river and into Batavia, where it entered the Java Sea.

In the port settlement of Bantam, now Banten, the earthquake destroyed a storage warehouse and caused additional damage. In Lampung, Sumatra, the earthquake threw every home off its foundations. More than 100 people were reported killed in Lampung.

== Earthquake ==
The characteristics of the event is not well determined but most likely a large intermediate-depth earthquake. Other researchers suggest it was a megathrust event with a magnitude of 9.0 M_{w} along the Sunda megathrust. If it were an intraslab earthquake occurring within the downgoing Australian plate as it subducts beneath the Sunda plate along the Sunda megathrust, the estimated moment magnitude (M_{w}) would be 7.4 to 8.0, with an epicenter near Batavia, and a focal depth of 100 km (62 mi). Modelling of the 1699 earthquake scenarios show that an intraslab earthquake of M_{w} 8.0 provided results consistent with historical documentation of the earthquake. High Mercalli intensity values at IX corresponds to the pattern of damage described by Dutch officials in Java and Sumatra. As Banten Province is situated on pyroclastic deposits and Quaternary sediments, seismic waves were likely amplified, resulting in higher degrees of shaking.

Simulations of a magnitude 9.0 earthquake only produced shaking assigned at VI to VII which did not match the damage descriptions. Such intensities would only cause moderate damage. Weaker levels of shaking would occur in the mountainous regions, which were insufficient to trigger a landslide. The earthquake was not accompanied by a tsunami, further disproving the megathrust theory for an earthquake of such intensity.

== Future hazard ==
In a simulation model, if an earthquake of similar size occurred in modern times, it would cause about 100,000 deaths.

== See also ==
- List of earthquakes in Indonesia
- List of historical earthquakes
