= Seismicity of the Sumatra coast =

Earthquake incidence in Sumatra region

Seismicity of the Sumatran coast identifies and describes the seismic activity of an area of western Indonesia near the island of Sumatra. Seismicity refers to the frequency, type and size of earthquakes experienced over a period of time. The Sumatran coast is in the subduction zone where the Indian plate meets the Burma plate beneath the Andaman Sea, forming the northern part of the Sunda trench. The shallow seismicity is characteristically distributed across a wide area of plate movement. The Sunda trench is also closely related to the Sumatran Fault, a transform fault running the entire length of the island.

== History ==
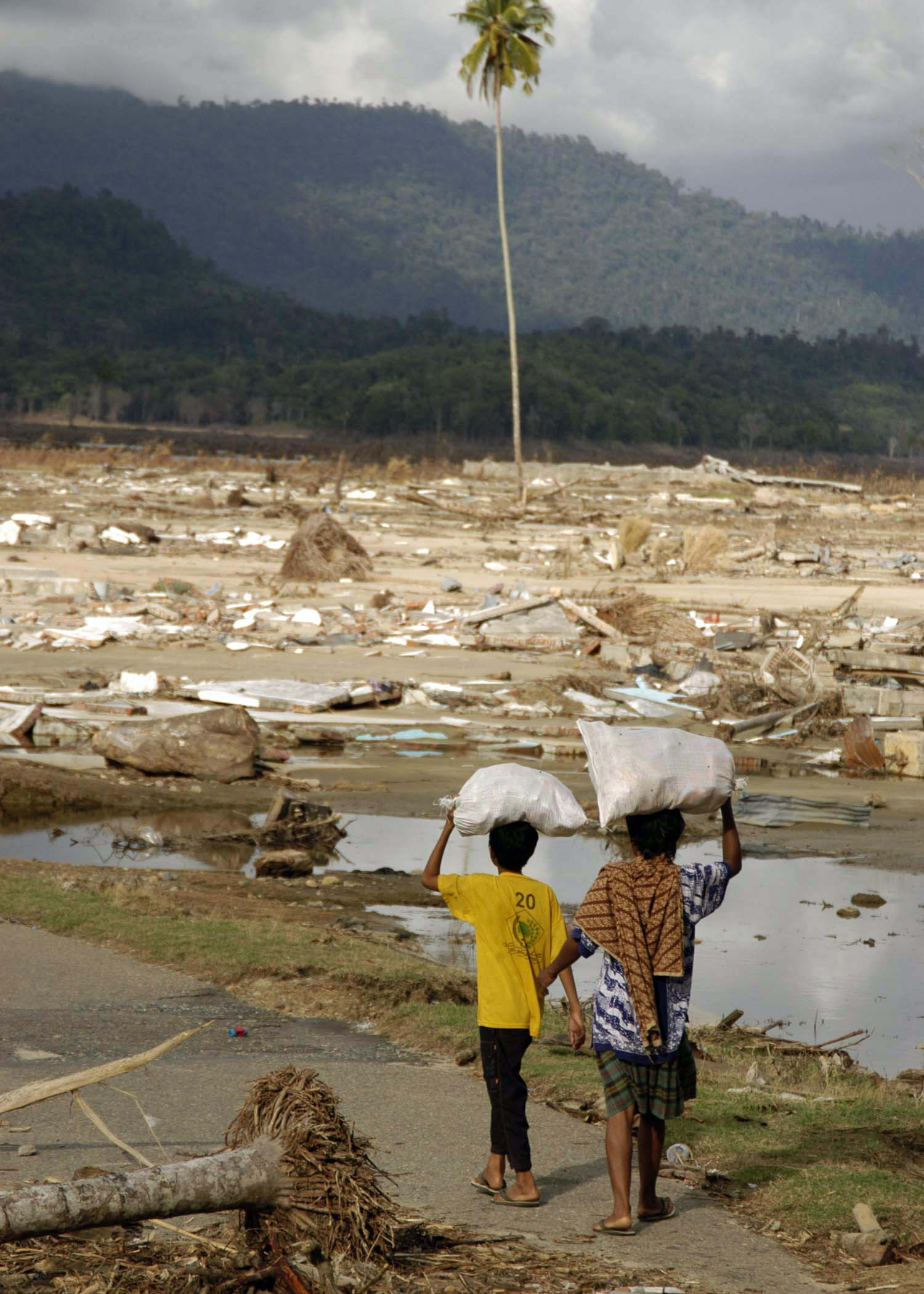
Devastation at the remote village of Lho Kruet on the island of Sumatra after the 2005 earthquake and tsunami

Significant events which devastated coastal communities in the 20th and 21st centuries include:

- 1833 Sumatra earthquake
- 2000 Enggano earthquake
- 2004 Indian Ocean earthquake and tsunami
- 2005 Nias–Simeulue earthquake
- 2007 Sumatra earthquakes
- 2010 Banyak Islands earthquake

The seismicity of the Sumatra coast and the top six quakes ever recorded appear to be clustered in two time periods: a 12-year span between 1952 and 1964 and a 7-year span between the 2004 and 2011; however, this is understood as a statistical anomaly.

The phenomenon comparably large quakes that happen on the same or neighbouring faults within months of each other can be explained by a sound geological mechanism—for example, the three quakes close succession: in April 2010 (7.8 magnitude), in May 2010 (7.2 magnitude) and October 2010 (7.7 magnitude). However, this does not fully demonstrate a relationship between events separated by longer periods and greater distances. Much of the massive offshore seismicity have been highly tsunamigenic, claiming hundreds of thousands of lives along the coast and the entire rim of the Indian Ocean
