= Geology of Indonesia =

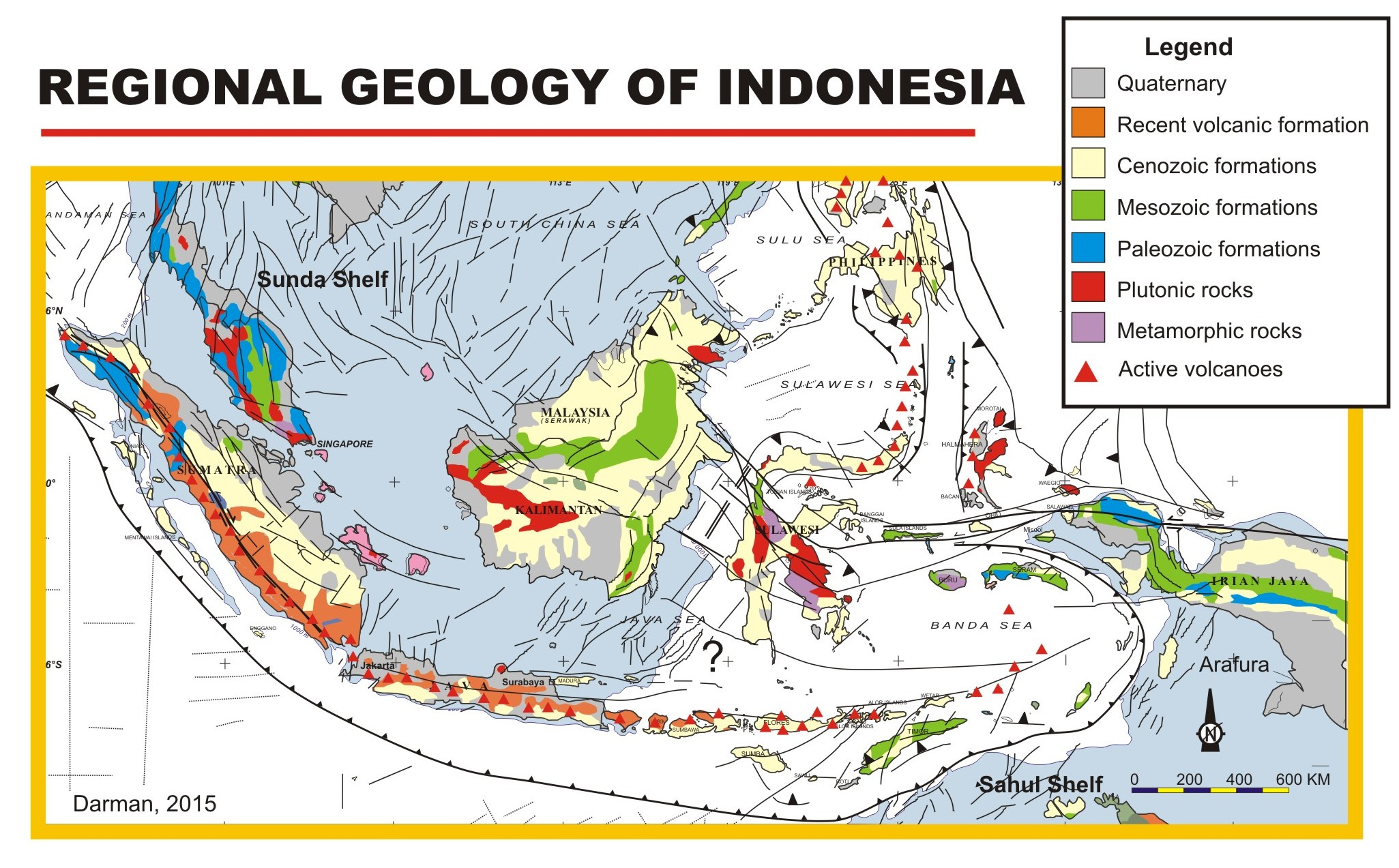

This is a brief summary of the geology of Indonesia. Indonesia is located between two major tectonic plates namely, the Australian Plate and the newly-separated Sunda Plate.

== Tectonics ==
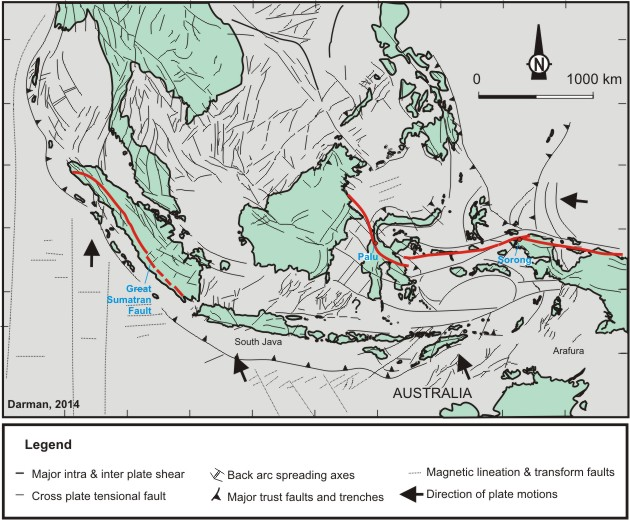
A simplified map of the geological structures of Indonesia.

The tectonics of Indonesia are very complex, as it is a meeting point of several tectonic plates. Indonesia is located between two continental plates: the Sahul Shelf and the Sunda Plate; and between two oceanic plates: the Pacific Plate and the Philippine Sea Plate.

The subduction of the Indian Plate beneath the Sunda Plate formed the volcanic arc in western Indonesia, one of the most seismically active areas on the planet with a long history of powerful eruptions and earthquakes. This chain of active volcanoes formed Sumatra, Java, Bali, and the Lesser Sunda Islands, most of which, particularly Java and Bali, emerged within the last 2–3 million years. The Pacific and Sahul plate movements controlled the tectonics of the eastern portion of Indonesia.

Subduction occurs along Southeastern Sumatra and West Java. Sumatra is more active in recent years despite being in the same subduction margin. The reason for the lack of frequent seismic activity over West Java is a problem of time frame and not of tectonic activity. While it may only take a hundred years for a large-scale earthquake to occur off the coast of Sumatra, it may take roughly 500 years off the coast of western Java.

Off the coast of western Java there is potentially a backthrust fault. The existence of the backthrust could increase the height of tsunamis off the coast. There are two megathrust segments, one off of Southeastern Sumatra and the other off of Western Java. These segments contribute to tsunamis that average at 11 m (36 ft) in size but that can reach 34 m (112 ft). The combination of megathrusts and backthrusts are reasons for such massive tsunamis.

== Structural geology ==
The tectonics processes in Indonesia formed major structures in Indonesia. The most prominent fault in the west of Indonesia is the Semangko Fault or the Great Sumatran Fault, a dextral strike-slip fault along Sumatra Island (about 1,900 km). The formation of this fault zone is related to the subduction zone in the west of Sumatra.

Palu-Koro fault is another major structural feature formed in the central part of Indonesia. This fault runs across the central part of Sulawesi Island and extends offshore to the west across Makassar Strait, and ends in the Mangkalihat Peninsula in Borneo. The fault is named after the capital city of Central Sulawesi, Palu, on the west coast of Sulawesi and the Koro River, which is formed by the fault zone.

Sorong fault is a significant left lateral fault in the eastern part of Indonesia, named after Sorong City. It has east-west orientation and extends from the northern part of West Papua to East Sulawesi for about 2000 km.

== Indonesian Seaway ==
The various formations in the Indonesian Archipelago and New Guinea's Torres Strait form geologic choke points to shipping and aqueous transport, particularly at depths below 100m (where said aqueous transport is largely closed); such routes, whether closed or still extant, collectively comprise the Indonesian Seaway between the Pacific and Indian oceans. Tectonic uplift of the region, exacerbated by lowered sea levels during recent glaciation, is hypothesized to have altered the regional climate, especially with respect to monsoons, beginning ~4 million years ago.

== Stratigraphy ==
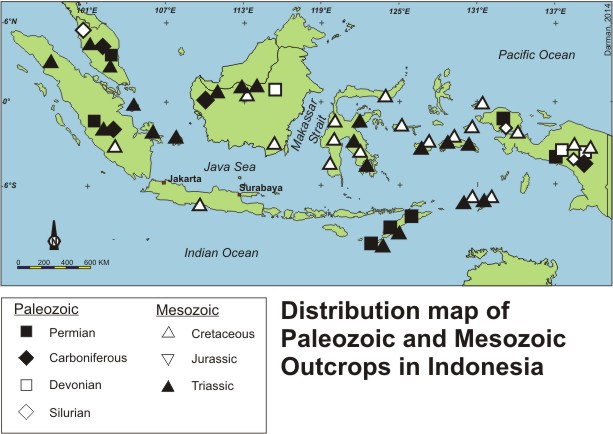
A summary map of the distribution of key Paleozoic and Mesozoic outcrops in Indonesia.

The stratigraphy of the western part of Indonesia is dominated by Cenozoic age formations, ranging from Paleogene to Quaternary. Minor Mesozoic and Paleozoic formations were found in places. Devonian limestones were found in Telen River, East Kalimantan, as fragments within Paleogene clastic sediments.

Eastern Indonesia has generally older stratigraphy compared to the western part. The stratigraphy ranges from Permian to Tertiary. Ichthyosaur fossils were found in the mud volcanoes in Kai Island, indicating Mesozoic deposition in the sub-surface (Charlton, 1992). Mesozoic macrofossils were studied in Misool Island by Fauzie Hasibuan (1996).

== See also ==
- List of earthquakes in Indonesia
- Volcanism of Indonesia
