= 1780 Java earthquake =

1780 Java Earthquake
- Location within Java Location within Indonesia
- Local date: 22 January 1780
- Magnitude: 7.0-8.5 M_{w}
- Epicenter: 8.600°S 105.500°E; Java, Dutch East Indies
- Fault: Java Trench or a shallow crustal fault, possibly the Baribis Fault
- Type: Shallow crustal or megathrust
- Areas affected: Java
- Max. intensity: MMI VIII (Severe)
- Casualties: Unknown

An earthquake affected the island of Java, Indonesia on 22 January 1780. The source and magnitude of the earthquake remains debated among seismologists. Proposed origins of the earthquake include shallow inland back-arc thrusting along a fault located within the upper crust on the island or rupture of the subduction zone off the southern coast of Java. The magnitude of the earthquake is estimated to be at least 8.5, while other sources usually refer to it with a range of M_{w} 8.0 to 8.5 for the megathrust earthquake. For the shallow crustal earthquake source, the magnitude range is M_{w} 7.0 to 8.0.

== Tectonic setting ==
The Java subduction zone has not had any large-magnitude earthquakes in the past 100 to 200 years except for an M8.0–8.5 Java Trench earthquake in 1780, which was the largest historical earthquake in the Java Trench. Recent large earthquakes in other subduction zones have cast doubt on the notion that long-term fault behavior can be inferred by as little as one century of historical earthquake records. The total convergence rate across the Java Trench is about 6 to 7 cm a year, higher than most other major subduction zones in the region.

== Earthquake ==
The earthquake occurred in the Sunda Strait segment of the Java Trench. The magnitude of the earthquake was estimated at M_{w} 8.5, although some experts provided a range of M_{w} 8.0–8.5.

However, seismologists also attribute the earthquake to shallow crustal faulting associated with a back-arc thrust fault running along the island. The Barbiris Fault which runs east–west south of Batavia (present-day Jakarta) may have been the source of the earthquake, with a magnitude of 7.0 to 8.0. Another M_{w} 7.0–7.7 earthquake occurred in 1834 along the fault. These conclusions came after running simulations of earthquake shaking based on damage and ground shaking reports from historical documents.

== Damage ==
The earthquake toppled buildings in Bogor, Banten and Batavia. Damage in Batavia was assigned VIII (Severe) on the Modified Mercalli intensity scale. Twenty-seven warehouses collapsed in the city due to the shaking. No information about the casualties due to limited historical records. An observatory in the city 24 meters high which was built in 1765 was badly damaged and abandoned after the earthquake. The earthquake may have triggered an increase in volcanic activity at Mount Salak and Pangrango.

== Future hazard ==
The Sunda Strait segment has the potential to trigger a large earthquake with a magnitude of 8.7 or higher. Prolonged inactivity in this section and the lack of historical record that might indicate any major subduction-type earthquakes signals the potential of a megathrust event in the Sunda Strait that can affect southern West Java and Sumatra. If the Sunda Strait, Enggano, and West-Central Java megathrust segments rupture at the same time, the magnitude can exceed 9.0. The Sunda Strait segment has a high risk of tsunami probability; seismic activity on this segment can cause a major tsunami.

== See also ==
- List of earthquakes in Indonesia
- Java Trench
