= 2016 Aceh earthquake =

Earthquake in Sumatra, Indonesia

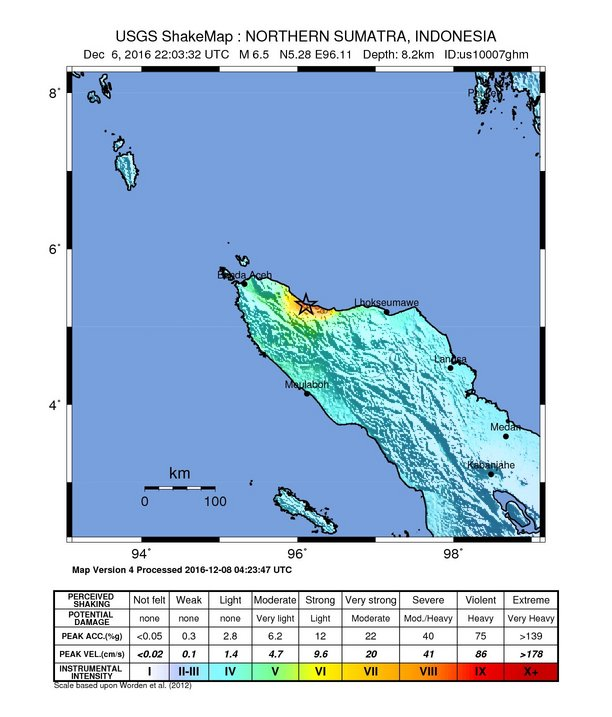
- Shakemap for the 2016 Aceh earthquake.

- Location within Sumatra
- UTC time: 2016-12-06 22:03:33
- ISC event: 609828738
- USGS-ANSS: ComCat
- Local date: 7 December 2016
- Local time: 05:03:33 WIB
- Duration: 10–15 seconds
- Magnitude: 6.5 M_{w}
- Depth: 13.0 km (8.1 mi)
- Epicenter: 5.283°N 96.168°E
- Fault: Unknown (possibly Samalanga – Sipopok fault)
- Type: Strike-slip
- Areas affected: Aceh, Indonesia
- Max. intensity: MMI VIII (Severe)
- Landslides: Unknown
- Aftershocks: 108 (As of 14 December)
- Casualties: 104 dead 1,273 injured ±84.000 displaced

The 2016 Aceh earthquake (Indonesian: Gempa Aceh 2016) struck the Indonesian island of Sumatra with a M_{w} of 6.5 in Aceh province on 7 December 2016, at 05:03 WIB (22:03 UTC 6 December 2016). The shock was reported to be at a depth of 13 km, categorized as a strong, shallow earthquake. The epicentre was located near the village of Reuleut in Pidie Jaya Regency, 164 km (102 mi) southeast of the province's capital, Banda Aceh. 104 people died in the quake, with at least 1,000 people injured. It was the deadliest earthquake in Aceh since the 2005 Nias–Simeulue earthquake and the deadliest in Sumatra since the 2010 Mentawai earthquake and tsunami.

== Earthquake ==
The earthquake struck at 05:03 a.m while many people were still sleeping or preparing for morning prayer. Hundreds of people panicked and ran through the streets as the earthquake struck, with eyewitnesses stating that most people were crying and screaming as their memories of the massive earthquake in 2004 were triggered. Many stated that the shaking was similar to the 2004 quake. Hundreds of people evacuated to higher ground, fearing that a tsunami would occur.

Even though the earthquake was categorized as a shallow earthquake, the Indonesian Agency for Meteorology, Climatology and Geophysics stated that there was no potential for a tsunami to occur. The shaking was strongly felt in Pidie and Pidie Jaya Regency and lasted for 10 – 15 seconds. The quake could be felt within the entire Aceh region.

The Deputy of Prevention and Alertness of the Indonesian National Board for Disaster Management, Wisnu Widjaja, stated that the energy released by the quake was equivalent to that released in the 1945 nuclear bombing of Hiroshima. The Head of the Geology Office, Ego Syahrial, stated that Pidie Jaya Regency was included as one of the most earthquake-prone cities in Aceh and was in the red zone.

== Impact ==
In the initial hours after the earthquake, structures across Aceh were reported to have been severely damaged. The dome of the Samalanga Mosque, Pidie's central mosque, had collapsed. Massive power outages occurred throughout Pidie and Pidie Jaya as telephone poles and electrical poles tumbled. Several houses collapsed during the quake. Roads were also damaged. Preliminary data suggest that 14 structures had collapsed during the quake, including a minimarket in Pidie. Photos of destroyed houses and buildings were circulated on social media. Indonesian National Board for Disaster Management later [stated that] "many structures" were damaged, of which 25 suffered heavy damage. Detailed information revealed that 72 stores had collapsed, 15 houses had been destroyed, 1 mall had collapsed, 5 mosques appeared destroyed and an Islamic school also had collapsed. It was reported that dozens of Islamic students were trapped under an Islamic School in Bireun Regency. Later reports revealed that 249 structures had been damaged in the quake, including 14 mosques and a hospital. The Indonesian National Disaster Management Board later confirmed that 686 structures were either destroyed or damaged.

At least 108 aftershocks followed the main shock in Aceh, with the largest measuring 5.3 M_{w} occurring in the mid-morning hours of 11 December 2016 at a depth of 20 km. The magnitude of the earthquake was also revised by the Indonesian Agency for Meteorology, Climatology and Geophysics from 6.4 M_{w} to 6.5 M_{w}.

The regent of Pidie Jaya, Aiyub Abbas, stated that approximately 30% of the area of Pidie Jaya was severely affected by the quake and also stated that he will travel back to Pidie Jaya after his duty visit to Istana Negara.

== Search and rescue efforts ==
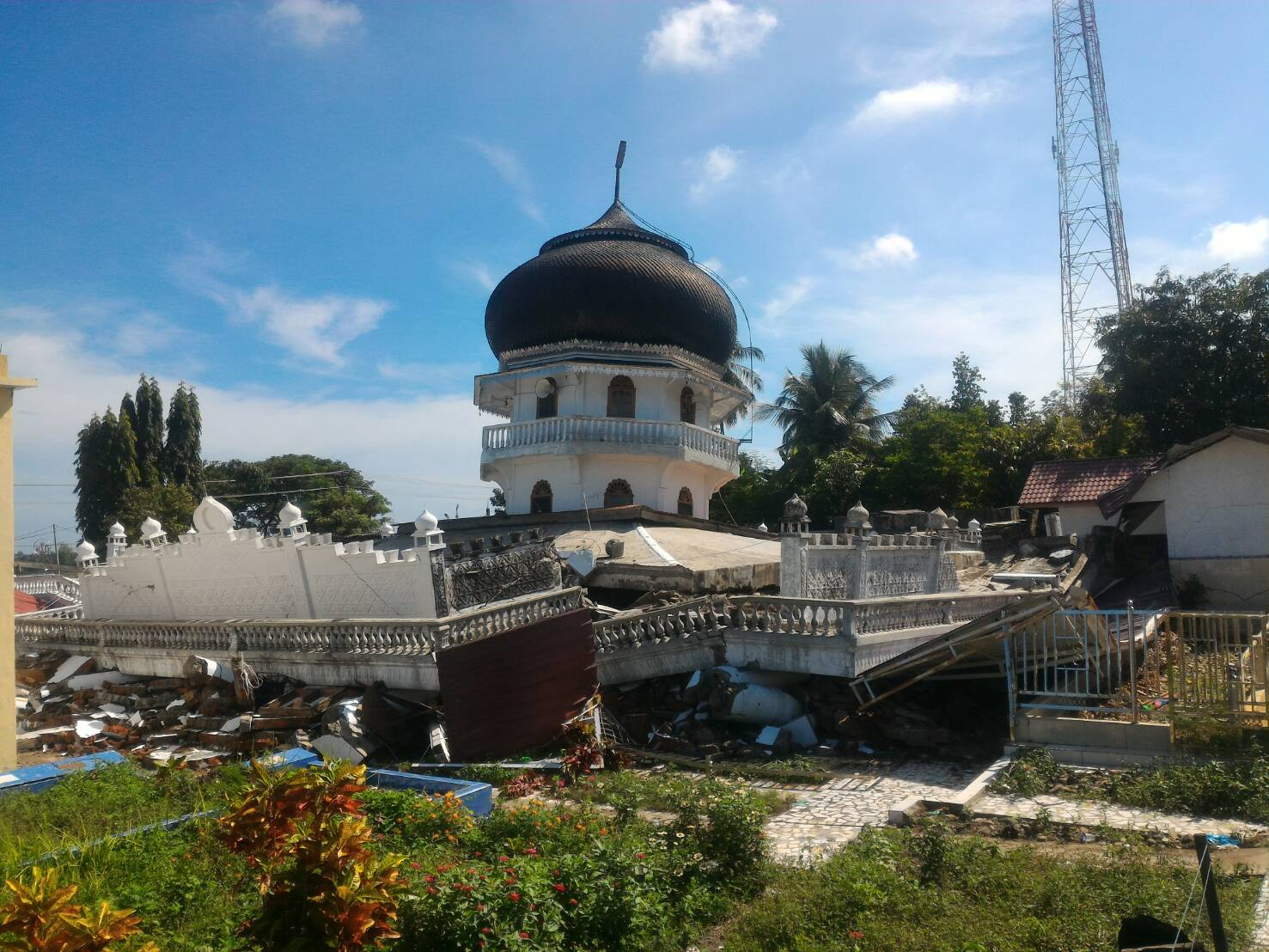
Masjid Jami' Quba Pangwa in Kuta Pangwa village, Trieng Gadeng district, Pidië Jaya Regency collapsed in the earthquake

Emergency services were overwhelmed in the aftermath of the quake. At least 30 people, including some children, were admitted to the nearest hospital for bone fractures. Search and rescue teams were immediately assembled and deployed to the scene, including the Disaster Victims Identification team (DVI). Coordination centres were set up in the hardest-hit areas. The Indonesian Volcanology and Geologic Disaster Mitigation departments, and the Ministry of Energy and Human Resources were also sent to the disaster area. One person was reportedly killed due to falling debris. Further search and rescue operations discovered more deaths in Pidie Jaya. The Vice Regent of Pidie Jaya Regency, Said Mulyadi, stated that at least 18 people were killed in the quake, with dozens trapped under rubble. The number reportedly injured was increased to 500, while treatment of the injured was initially limited to the streets as treating patients indoors was prohibited for fear of aftershocks. As local hospitals were overwhelmed, more survivors were transported to other main hospitals, including Pidie Jaya Hospital (outdoor, as the indoor section were heavily damaged) and Chik Di Tiro Hospital. Severely injured people were transported by helicopters to Banda Aceh, the provincial capital.

Indonesian President Joko Widodo ordered the Presidential Chief of Staff Teten Masduki to travel to Aceh in response to the quake. He later added that other presidential officials were ordered to Aceh. The Indonesian Government will set up tents, shelters, and camps for the survivors of the quake. The State Electricity Company (Perusahaan Listrik Negara) deployed 20 personnel to the disaster zone to check the electrical conditions in the area. The National Search and Rescue Agency deployed special teams in response to the quake, consisting of 2 teams of 20 staff each. The Indonesian Red Cross sent 500 family kits, 500 hygiene kits, 1,000 blankets, 1,000 mats, and 200 body bags, plus 2 ambulances. A search and rescue team from Medan, North Sumatra, deployed 2 teams to Aceh to assist rescuers.

The acting governor of Aceh Soedarmo ordered all agencies to work in the hardest hit areas and stated that deploying heavy equipment and distribution of aid supplies were the first priorities. The Ministry of Public Works also sent several personnel to Aceh, including its General Director. The Minister of Social Affairs, Khofifah Indar Parawansa, will travel to Aceh in order to help the survivors The ministry had deployed Taruna Siaga Bencana in response to the quake. Khofifah then stated that evacuation and refugee centres had been set up in the areas affected by the quake, and that the ministry will deploy 33,000 additional volunteers to assist in aid efforts. The Indonesian Navy sent a ship to Aceh for logistic deployment.

The Aceh Government later declared a state of emergency for 14 days in response to the quake, as the government needed immediate help from the central government in Jakarta. Chief of the Aceh Regional Police Rio S Djambak stated that the hardest hit areas in Pidie Jaya were in Ulee Glee and Meureudu, with 23 fatalities confirmed in the area. Volunteers in Aceh stated that Pidie Jaya medical resources were overwhelmed due to a lack of medical staff in the city, which resulted in many injured being untreated.

At noon on 7 December 2016, the death toll was revised by Indonesian authorities to 45, according to the Head of Health Instance of Pidie Jaya, later rose to 49. The Indonesian National Board for Disaster Management sent around 740 personnel to Pidie Jaya from Pidie, consisting of the Indonesian National Army and Pidie Regency's Tagana. The death toll was later revised again to 52, as rescuers retrieved more bodies under the rubble. Most of the dead were residents in Pidie Jaya Regency. The death toll increased to 54 when 2 additional fatalities were reported in Bireuën Regency. On the afternoon of 7 December, the death toll jumped to 92, while army official had told Metro TV that 97 people were killed in the quake. On the evening, the death toll was revised to 97.

Indonesian authorities confirmed that 73 people were seriously injured in the incident. At least 80 critically injured people were transported to Bireun Hospital as hospitals in Pidie and Pidie Jaya were overwhelmed. An additional 38 doctors were placed on standby. As the hospital lacks an intensive care unit, treatment could only be done outdoors in tents. Hospital officials later stated that they only accepted those with serious injuries, while people with minor injuries such as cuts were denied treatment. On 8 December 2016 the hospital stated that they will treat all injured for free.

Social Minister Khofifah Indar Parawanasa had sent several rounds of donation and assistance from Central and Regional Storage of Sumatra to the victims. Based on official statements from the ministry, it had sent 40 family tents, 3,000 mats, 1,200 tents, 15 multi-functional tents, 2 psycho-social tents and 2,000 blankets. The ministry also sent 250 family kits, 150 sets of children's clothing, and 121,000 boxes of instant noodles. These supplies were scheduled to arrive in Pidie Jaya on 9 December. The aid received by the survivors on 7 December came from the Social Office in Pidie Jaya.

The Yogyakarta Regional Disaster Management Board sent a 7-person search and rescue team to assist the evacuation process in Pidie Jaya. The North Sumatra Regional Police also sent several of its members to the disaster site. The Indonesian army deployed 1,000 personnel, and also planned to send 80 additional medical personnel to Aceh.

On 8 December 2016, the Indonesian National Board for Disaster Management deployed a team of experts specializing in collapsed buildings to the region. The Board will also ship medicine and food to the region via air, courtesy of the Indonesian Air Force. The commander of the Indonesian National Armed Forces Gatot Nurmantyo stated that it will send 218 personnel to the affected region. It was later confirmed that Nurmantyo will travel to the disaster area to survey the damage. The Indonesian National Board for Disaster Management later stated that 100 bodies had been evacuated with 1 person listed as missing. Indonesian soldiers made a temporary hospital in Pidie Jaya Regency and appointed 24 specialists. The head of the Regional Police of North Sumatra Rycko Amelza Dahniel deployed several units of its forces for humanitarian purposes in Aceh.

On 12 December 2016, National Search and Rescue Agency confirmed that the search and rescue operation was officially ended.

== Aftermath ==
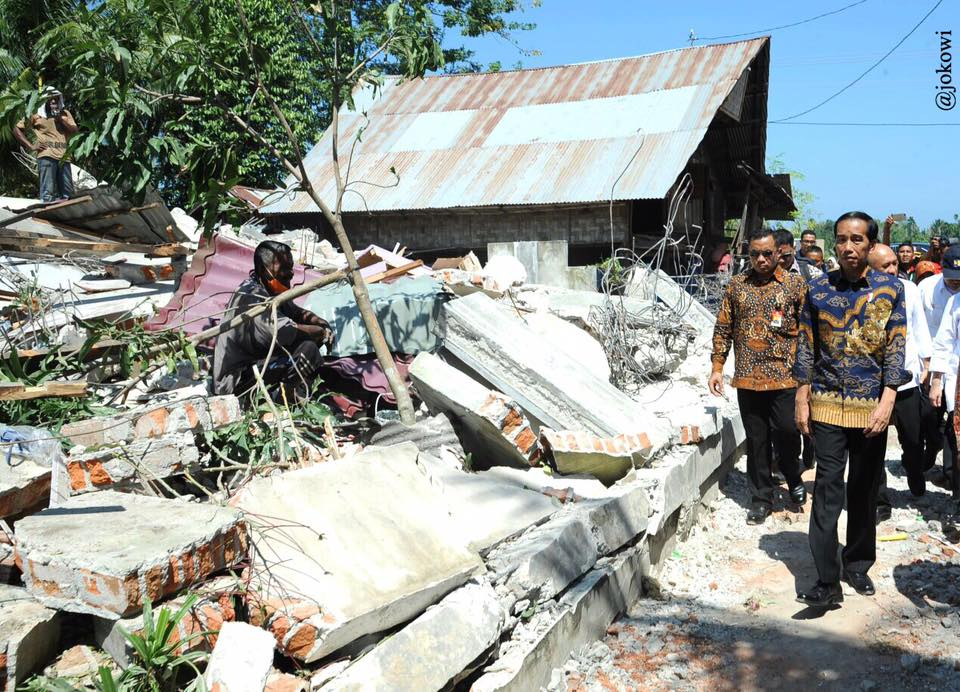
President Joko Widodo visiting areas affected by the earthquake, 15 December 2016.

Immediately after the quake, the #PrayForAceh went viral on Twitter, with most people offering condolences and prayers to the victims of the quake. By 8 December 2016, the hashtag had reached a total number of 250.000 tweets. Rumah Lembang, a campaign house for Basuki Tjahaja Purnama and Djarot Saiful Hidayat that were competing for the 2017 Jakarta Governor election, held a minute of silence to honor the victims. The President of Indonesia Joko Widodo and Vice President Jusuf Kalla conducted an emergency meeting in the aftermath of the quake. Joko Widodo, alongside Basuki Tjahaja Purnama, the Head of Regional People's Representatives Council Mohammad Saleh, and the Head of the People's Consultative Assembly, Zulkifli Hasan, sent condolences to the victims of the quake. Anies Baswedan, competing for the 2017 gubernatorial election, also sent his sincere condolences to the victims and asked Indonesian people to unite and help the victims in Pidie.

Many Islamic agencies and political parties opened charity programs and solidarity programs for the victims of the earthquake. The Central Administrator Council agreed to open a crisis centre for the people affected by the quake in Pidie Jaya. Ambulances, medicines and medics were sent to aid the victims. The Prosperous Justice Party (Indonesian: Partai Keadilan Sejahtera) sent their sincere condolences and issued a solidarity program to the victims. The party also set up a crisis centre in the disaster area. The Head of the People's Representative Council, Setya Novanto, sent condolences to the victims and asked his co-workers and representatives to help the victims.

Former Indonesian President Susilo Bambang Yudhoyono sent his deepest sympathy to the victims and also asked his fellow politicians in the Democratic Party to help with efforts. The party has coordinated with the local Indonesian National Board for Disaster Management and the Indonesian telecommunication giant Indosat Ooredoo. Officials have also stated that they are coordinating with Indonesian Students Legislative Council Forum. The Indonesian telecommunication company Telkomsel offered free calling services and phone facility services in Meurudu and Ulee Glee, and added that they are coordinating with the local government to assist the victims. The National Mandate Party (Indonesian: Partai Amanat Nasional) had also offered its help to the victims. The party's Secretary General, Eddy Suparno, stated that the party is willing to help the people of Aceh, and will set up a crisis centre in Aceh. The chief of staff of the party immediately ordered his staff in Aceh to visit the hardest hit areas.

The Islamic Defenders Front opened a crisis centre in Aceh and also sent volunteers to assist with efforts. Muhammadiyah, along with several local Islamic organisations in Aceh also joined the solidarity program. The Navy Base in Belawan had one ship on standby for helping the victims of the quake. The ship, KRI Sibolga, is on standby to assist the volunteers and social workers in dealing with the aftermath of the quake.

Multiple Indonesian artists and journalists engaged in gestures of solidarity for the victims. Indonesian singer Tompi, who was born in Aceh, opened a charity line for the victims. Raisa, a famous Indonesian singer, sent her condolences to the victims, alongside Haruka Nakagawa, from JKT48. A message of condolence was also sent from Vidi Aldiano.

The mayor of Surabaya Tri Rismaharini offered medical assistance to help the evacuation process in Pidie Jaya. She immediately delegated her assistant to coordinate between her government and the Aceh government. She will also send funds to the National Disaster Mitigation Centre in Aceh. During a press conference, Jusuf Kalla confirmed that President Joko Widodo will visit the disaster zone after a state visit in Bali. Jusuf Kalla also sent condolences to the victims.

Social Minister Khofifah Indar Parawansa stated that relatives of the victims of the disaster will be given financial compensation for their losses. Relatives will be given Rp.15,000,000 per person killed, and Rp. 5,000,000 for each person seriously injured. She later sent her deepest sympathy to the victims and offered "her best performance" to assist the victims affected by the quake. The ministry sent a trauma team to the region to assist with traumatized people, particularly children. Social Minister Khofifah stated that in an emergency situation such as this, the local government could send emergency food and supplies of up to 100-200 tonnes for survivors and displaced persons.

The Russian President Vladimir Putin, Singaporean President Tony Tan Keng Yam and Singaporean Prime Minister Lee Hsien Loong offered condolences to Indonesia. Malaysia also sent a condolence letter, stating that they are ready to help Aceh if needed. Singapore also stated its willingness to help Aceh. In a different statement, the Singapore Civil Defence Force will deploy 2 of its personnel to Indonesia. The Japanese Government had also offered its condolence to Indonesia in response to the quake and stated that Japan is ready to help Aceh, according to the statement released by Japanese Foreign Minister Fumio Kishida. Australian government had also sent a message of condolence to Indonesia. Australian Foreign Minister Julie Bishop stated that Australia will provide 1 million Australian dollars ($750,000) of humanitarian aid through the Indonesian Red Cross. The Indian Government had also sent its condolence to Indonesia along with Cuba and China.

Before the start of the semifinal match of the 2016 AFF Suzuki Cup Championship between Indonesia and Vietnam on 7 December, a minute of silence was observed.

On 8 December 2016, Interior Minister Tjahjo Kumolo visited Aceh to observe the damage. Acehnese students in Yogyakarta held solidarity program throughout the city. Indonesian telecommunication company XL Axiata sent donations of school equipments and logistics to the areas affected. XL had also set up a crisis centre in Aceh and opened charity line for the victims. Riau Government and Pekanbaru Government sent a tonne of aids to Pidie Jaya. The aids would be flown from Roesmin Nurjadin Airstrip in Pekanbaru, Riau's provincial capital. On the noon of 8 December, Indonesian President Joko Widodo arrived in Pidie Jaya and immediately held a search and rescue coordination meeting attended by Health Minister Nila Moeloek, Minister of Public Work and Houses Basuki Hadimuljono, Cabinet Secretary Pramono Anung, Commander of the Indonesian Armed Forces Gatot Nurmantyo, Head of Indonesian National Police Tito Karnavian, Acting President Teten Masduki and Aceh Acting Governor Soedarmo. He later visited hospitals and spoke to the survivors of the quake about their needs. He would observe the evacuation process of the victims, logistics distribution and infrastructures in Aceh.

Aids were also sent by West Sumatra Red Cross and the Singaporean Red Cross. The Singaporean Red Cross sent donations worth S$. 50,000 (Rp. 470,000,000) to Aceh. Indonesian Disaster Management Board sent aids worth of Rp. 3.5 billion including 10 emergency generators to the disaster zone. Logistics were also sent by Indonesian Disaster Management Board via air. They later deployed life detectors and search and rescue dogs to the area affected. Consequently, 4 airlines, which were Indonesia AirAsia, Lion Air, Tri-MG Intra Asia Airlines, and Sriwijaya Air offered free logistics distribution to Aceh. Transportation Ministry deployed 7 of its ships to Aceh.

Vigils and prayers service for the victims were held throughout Indonesia. In Surabaya, dozens of artists held a 1.000 candles vigil. In Pamekasan, East Java, dozens of kindergarten students attended a prayer service and charity work. In Klaten, Central Java, hundreds of elementary school students attended prayer for the dead.

On 12 December 2016, a tonne of rendang from West Sumatra arrived in Pidie Jaya. Government of Central Aceh Regency had also sent funds of Rp. 90 million and two vegetable trucks.

On 14 December 2016, Spokesman of the Chinese Foreign Ministry Geng Shuang confirmed that the Chinese Government will send funds of $1.000.000 to Indonesia. The Chinese Red Cross will also send an additional $100.000 to Aceh through the Indonesian Red Cross. The Japanese Government, through the Japan International Cooperation Agency (JICA) will also send 500 tents to Aceh.

On 15 December 2016, President Joko Widodo revisited Aceh immediately after his visit in Iran. He stated that he would observe the handling of the survivors and the quake victims. The Mayor of Hirogawa in Wakayama Prefecture, Japan; Toshiki Nishioka, sent funds of 1 million yen to the victims of the quake. The funds were retrieved by the Aceh Regional Secretary, Dermawan.

On 16 December 2016, Indonesian President Joko Widodo held another closed meeting with Vice President Jusuf Kalla for the handling of the survivors of the quake.

== See also ==
- 2013 Aceh earthquake
- List of earthquakes in Indonesia
