= List of earthquakes in Indonesia =

This is an incomplete list of more recent recorded major earthquakes that have occurred within the boundaries of Indonesia. The determinants of the activity are indicated by the geology of the region, and the volcanic activity.

Large numbers of earthquakes of smaller magnitude occur very regularly due to the meeting of major tectonic plates in the region. Based on the records of the USGS, Indonesia has had more than 150 earthquakes with magnitude > 7 in the period 1901–2019.

The United States Geological Survey ranks Indonesia as the most seismically active country in the world, followed by Chile and Japan. On average, there is a magnitude 7 earthquake every year and one of magnitude >8 every 5 to 7 years. A magnitude 9 event possibly occurs every 100 years somewhere in the country, although these can generate other events of similar or lower magnitude in chains, as was the case with the 9.3 magnitude Aceh earthquake in 2004, which, due to subsequent tectonic stress, caused the major earthquakes of magnitude 8.7 in 2005, 8.5 in 2007, and 8.6 and 8.2 in 2012.

Map of earthquakes in Indonesia 1900– (map data)

Six of the ten strongest Indonesian earthquakes ≥ 8.3 M_{w} occurred near Sumatra and along the Sunda Trench.

== Earthquakes ==
=== 2000–present ===
Date	Region	Mag.	MMI	Fatalities	Injuries	Comments	Notes
2026-08-17	East Nusa Tenggara	5.7 M_{w}	V	2		Aftershocks	
2026-08-15	North Sumatra	6.9 M_{w}	V				
2026-08-15	Flores	7.8 M_{w}	VIII	142	1,776		
2026-06-16	Central Sulawesi	6.7 M_{w}	VII	3	111	Severe damage	
2026-06-08	North Sulawesi	7.8 M_{w}	VIII	1	3	Damage in Sangihe, Talaud Islands	
2026-04-01	North Maluku	7.4 M_{w}	VIII	1	2		
2026-02-05	East Java	5.8 M_{w}	IV	1	47	Hundreds buildings damaged	
2025-09-30	East Java	6.0 M_{w}	VI		6	More than 200 building damaged	
2025-08-17	Sulawesi	5.8 M_{w}	VI	2	42	Severe damage	
2025-05-23	Bengkulu	5.7 M_{w}	VI	1	2	More than 300 building damaged	
2025-03-17	North Sumatra	5.4 M_{w}	V	1	Several		
2024-09-18	West Java	5.0 M_{w}	VII	2	159	8,437 buildings damaged	
2024-09-07	Bali	4.8 M_{w}	VI	1	3	10 buildings damaged.	
2024-04-27	West Java	6.1 M_{w}	V	1	12	Hundreds buildings damaged	
2024-03-22	East Java	6.4 M_{w}	VIII		14	3,500 building damage in Bawean island, Tuban and Surabaya	
2023-06-30	Special Region of Yogyakarta	5.9 M_{w}	IV	1	23	Severe damage	
2023-04-24	Sumatra	7.1 M_{w}	VIII			Moderate damage	
2023-04-14	East Java	7.0 M_{w}	V	1			
2023-02-09	Papua	5.1 M_{w}	V	4	5	Severe damage	
2023-01-18	North Maluku	7.0 M_{w}	V			Minor damage	
2023-01-09	Maluku	7.6 M_{w}	VI		11	Moderate damage	
2022-12-03	West Java	5.7 M_{w}	IV		2	Slight damage	
2022-11-21	West Java	5.6 M_{w}	VIII	335–635	7,729	Extreme damage	
2022-09-30	Sumatra	5.9 M_{w}	VII	2	25	Moderate damage	
2022-02-25	Sumatra	6.1 M_{w}	VIII	27	457	Severe damage	
2022-01-14	Banten	6.6 M_{w}	VI		10	3,000 buildings damaged	
2021-12-14	Flores	7.3 M_{w}	VI	1	173	Severe damage	
2021-10-16	Bali	4.7 M_{w}	IV	4	72		
2021-08-26	Sulawesi	5.5 M_{w}	VII	1	39		
2021-07-26	Sulawesi	6.3 M_{w}	VI	1			
2021-04-11	Java	6.0 M_{w}	V	10	104		
2021-02-03	Sulawesi	4.9 M_{w}	III	1			
2021-01-14	Sulawesi	6.2 M_{w}	VI	105	3,369		
2020-10-27	Sulawesi	5.4 M_{w}	VI	1			
2019-11-12	Maluku	5.0 M_{w}	IV	2	9	Aftershock.	
2019-11-04	Molucca Sea	7.1 M_{w}	VII	1	3		
2019-10-10	Maluku	5.2 M_{w}	IV	1	3	Casualties due to damage to a college.	
2019-09-25	Maluku	6.5 M_{w}	VII	41	1,578	Landslides.	
2019-08-02	Java	6.9 M_{w}	VI	8	8		
2019-07-14	North Maluku	7.2 M_{w}	VIII	14	129		
2019-04-12	Sulawesi	6.8 M_{w}	VI	1			
2019-03-17	Lombok	5.5 M_{w}	V	6	182		
2018-11-14	Sulawesi	5.6 M_{w}	VII	7	6	Landslides.	
2018-10-10	Java	6.0 M_{w}	V	4	36		
2018-09-28	Sulawesi	7.5 M_{w}	X	4,340	10,679	Major tsunami (up to 11m), more than 600 people missing.	
2018-08-19	Lombok	6.9 M_{w}	VII	14	24	Fatalities also in Sumbawa.	
2018-08-19	Lombok	6.3 M_{w}	VII	2	3	Aftershock.	
2018-08-09	Lombok	5.9 M_{w}	VII	6	24	Aftershock.	
2018-08-05	Lombok	6.9 M_{w}	VIII	513	1,353	Widespread damage.	
2018-07-29	Lombok	6.4 M_{w}	VI	20	401	Foreshock.	
2018-07-21	Sumatra	5.2 M_{W}		1	2		
2018-04-18	Java	4.5 M_{W}		3	21	Buildings damaged in Kalibening District.	
2018-01-23	Java	6.0 M_{W}	V	2	41		
2017-12-15	Java	6.5 M_{w}	VII	4	36		
2017-11-18	North Maluku	5.8 M_{w}	VI	1		Moderate damage	
2017-10-31	Ambon	6.3 M_{w}	VII	1			
2016-12-07	Sumatra	6.5 M_{w}	VIII	104	1,273	Heavy damage in Aceh region.	
2016-03-02	Sumatra	7.8 M_{w}	III				
2015-07-28	Papua	7.0 M_{w}	VII	1		Buildings damaged or destroyed.	
2013-07-02	Sumatra	6.1 M_{w}		43	276		
2013-04-06	Papua	7.0 M_{w}	VII	3	2	Deaths from landslides.	
2012-08-18	Sulawesi	6.3 M_{w}	VIII	6	43	Severe damage	
2012-04-11	Wharton Basin	8.2 M_{w}	VI			Doublet	
2012-04-11	Wharton Basin	8.6 M_{w}	VII	10	12	Doublet	
2011-10-13	Bali	6.1 M_{w}	V		43		
2011-09-05	Sumatra	6.7 M_{w}		10			
2010-10-25	Sumatra	7.8 M_{w}	VII	408		Tsunami (local), hundreds missing.	
2010-06-16	Papua	7.0 M_{w}	VII	17			
2010-04-06	Banyak Islands	7.8 M_{w}	VIII		62		
2010-01-10	Java	5.1 M_{w}	V	1	2		
2009-10-01	Sumatra	6.6 M_{w}	VII	3		Severe damage.	
2009-09-30	Sumatra	7.6 M_{w}	VIII	1,115	2,902	Tsunami (local)	
2009-09-02	Java	7.3 M_{w}	VII	79	1,250	Tsunami (local)	
2009-02-12	Talaud	7.2 M_{w}	VI		64		
2009-01-04	West Papua	7.4 M_{w}	VII			Doublet	
2009-01-04	West Papua	7.7 M_{w}	VI	4	50+	Doublet / tsunami (local)	
2008-11-16	Sulawesi	7.3 M_{w}	VII	4	59		
2008-02-20	Simeulue	7.4 M_{w}		4	25		
2007-09-13	Sumatra	7.0 M_{w}	VII				
2007-09-13	Sumatra	7.9 M_{w}	VII	23	88		
2007-09-12	Sumatra	8.5 M_{w}	VI				
2007-03-06	Sumatra	6.3 M_{w}	VI				
2007-03-06	Sumatra	6.4 M_{w}	VIII	68	460		
2007-01-21	Molucca Sea	7.5 M_{w}	VI	4			
2006-12-18	Sumatra	5.8 M_{w}	VI	7			
2006-07-17	Java	7.7 M_{w}	V	668	9,299	Tsunami (regional)	
2006-05-27	Java	6.4 M_{w}	IX	5,749	38,568	Extreme damage	
2006-03-14	Seram	6.7 M_{w}	VI	4		Tsunami (local) (7 m (23 ft))	
2005-03-28	Sumatra	8.6 M_{w}	VIII	1,314	1,146		
2004-12-26	Sumatra–Andaman	9.2–9.3 M_{w}	IX	227,898		Tsunami (basin wide), 167,540 fatalities in Indonesia	
2004-11-26	Papua	7.1 M_{w}	VIII	32	130–213		
2004-11-11	Alor	7.5 M_{w}	VIII	34	400	Severe damage	
2004-02-07	Western New Guinea	7.3 M_{w}				Doublet / Damage at Nabire	
2004-02-05	Western New Guinea	7.0 M_{w}	VI	37		Doublet	
2004-01-01	Bali	5.8 M_{w}	VI	1	29	Several thousand buildings damaged	NGDC 1972
2003-05-26	Halmahera	7.0 M_{w}	VIII	1			
2002-11-02	Sumatra	7.3 M_{w}	VI	3	65		
2002-10-10	Western New Guinea	7.5 M_{w}		8	632	Tsunami (local)	
2000-06-04	Sumatra	7.9 M_{w}	VIII	103	2,174		
2000-05-04	Sulawesi	7.6 M_{w}	VII	46	264	Tsunami (local)	NGDC 1972

=== 1900–1999 ===
Date	Region	Mag.	MMI	Fatalities	Injuries	Comments	
1999-12-21	Java	6.5 M_{w}	VII	5	220		
1998-11-29	North Maluku	7.7 M_{w}	VII	41	171	Tsunami	
1998-09-28	East Java	6.6 M_{w}	V	1	200	Hundreds building damage	
1997-09-28	South Sulawesi	5.9 M_{w}	VII	18	300	Severe damage	
1996-02-17	Biak	8.1 M_{w}	IX	166	423		
1996-01-01	Sulawesi	7.9 M_{w}		8		Tsunami (local)	
1995-10-06	Sumatra	6.8 M_{w}		84	1868	Extreme damage	NGDC 1972
1994-06-03	Java	7.8 M_{w}	IV	250		Tsunami (local)	
1994-02-15	Sumatra	7.0 M_{w}	VII	207	2,000+		
1992-12-12	Flores	7.8 M_{w}	IX–X	2,500	500	Tsunami (local)	
1989-08-01	West Papua	6.0 M_{w}	VIII	120	125		
1984-11-17	Sumatra	7.2 M_{w}	VII		1		
1982-12-25	Flores	5.9 M_{w}	VI	13	390		
1981-01-19	Papua	6.8 M_{L}		305		Hundreds missing	
1979-12-18	Bali	6.3 M_{s}	VIII	27	200+		
1979-09-12	West Papua	7.5 M_{w}	IX	115		Tsunami	
1977-08-19	Sumba	8.3 M_{w}		180	1,100	Tsunami (local)	
1976-07-14	Bali	6.5 M_{s}	IX	573	4,750		
1976-06-25	Papua	7.1 M_{w}	X	422		Landslides, thousands missing	
1969-02-23	West Sulawesi	7.0 M_{w}	VIII	664		Tsunami	
1968-10-14	Sulawesi	7.4 M_{L}		213			
1967-02-19	East Java	6.3 M_{w}	VII	54	300	Heavy damage in Malang and Trenggalek Regencies	
1965-01-24	Sanana	8.2 M_{w}		71			
1950-06-12	Java	6.6 M_{w}	VII	16			
1943-06-08	Sumatra	7.2 M_{w}				Doublet	
1943-06-09	Sumatra	7.5 M_{w}				Doublet	
1943-07-23	Java	7.0 M_{w}	VIII	213	2,096	Severe damage	NGDC 1972
1943-04-01	Java	7.1 M_{w}	VII			Severe	
1938-02-01	Banda Sea	8.5–8.6 M_{w}	VII			Tsunami (local)	
1937-09-27	Java	6.9 M_{w}	VII	1		300 Homes destroyed	
1935-12-28	Sumatra	7.7 M_{w}	VIII			Tsunami (local)	
1933-06-24	Sumatra	7.7 M_{s}	IX	76+		Heavy damage. Volcanic eruption triggered.	
1931-09-25	Sumatra	7.3 M_{w}				Tsunami (Local)	
1926-09-10	Java	7.1 M_{w}	VII				
1926-06-28	West Sumatra	7.6 M_{L}	VII	354			
1924-12-02	Central Java	5.8 M_{w}	IX	900		Extreme damage and mudslide in Wonosobo Regency	
1921-09-11	Java	7.6 M_{w}					
1917-01-20	Bali	6.6 M_{s}	IX	1,500		Landslides	
1916-09-11	East Java	6.6 M_{w}				Many homes damaged	
1913-03-14	Mindanao	7.9 M_{w}	IX	138			
1909-06-04	Sumatra	7.6 M_{w}	IX	195–200			
1907-01-04	Sumatra	8.2–8.4 M_{w}	VIII	2,188		Tsunami (regional)	
1903-02-27	Java, Sumatra	7.3 M_{w}	VIII			Tsunami	

=== 1629–1899 ===
Date	Region	Mag.	MMI	Fatalities	Injuries	Comments	
1899-09-30	Seram	7.8 M_{s}		3,864		Tsunami (local)	
1898-01-06	Ambon			126	300+	Heavy damage	
1867-06-10	Java	7.8 M_{w}	IX	700		Severe damage	
1861-02-16	Sumatra	8.5 M_{w}		2,000+			
1852-11-25	Banda Sea	8.3 M_{s}	IX	60+		Severe damage / tsunami (regional)	NGDC 1972
1843-01-05	Sumatra	7.3 M_{s}	XI	Many		Severe damage / tsunami (local)	NGDC 1972
1834-10-10	Java	7.0–7.7 M_{w}	IX	5			
1833-11-25	Sumatra	8.8–9.2 M_{w}		Numerous		Tsunami (local)	
1833-01-28	Java	7.0 M_{w}	VII-VIII	Multiple			
1820-12-29	Flores Sea	7.5 M_{w}		500		Tsunami	
1815-11-22	Bali	7.0 M_{s}		10,253		Tsunami	NGDC 1972
1797-02-10	Sumatra	8.6–8.8 M_{w}		Numerous		Tsunami (local)	
1780-01-22	Java	8.0–8.5 M_{w}	VIII			Severe Damage	
1699-01-05	Batavia (Jakarta)	7.4-8.0 M_{w}	IX	128		Severe Damage	
1674-02-17	Ambon–Seram	6.8 M_{s}		86	135	Severe damage / tsunami	NGDC 1972
1629-08-01	Banda Sea	8.2–8.8 M_{s}				Tsunami (regional)	
Note: The inclusion criteria for adding events are based on WikiProject Earthquakes' notability guideline that was developed for stand alone articles. The principles described also apply to lists. In summary, only damaging, injurious, or deadly events should be recorded.

== Gallery ==
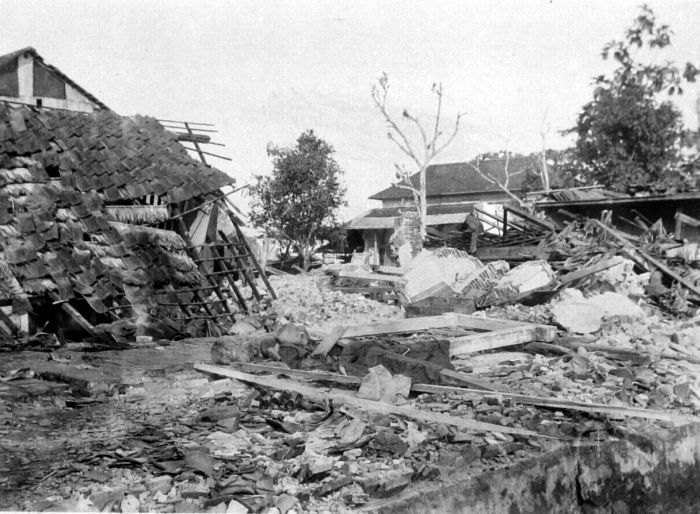
Earthquake damage in Ambon, 1898

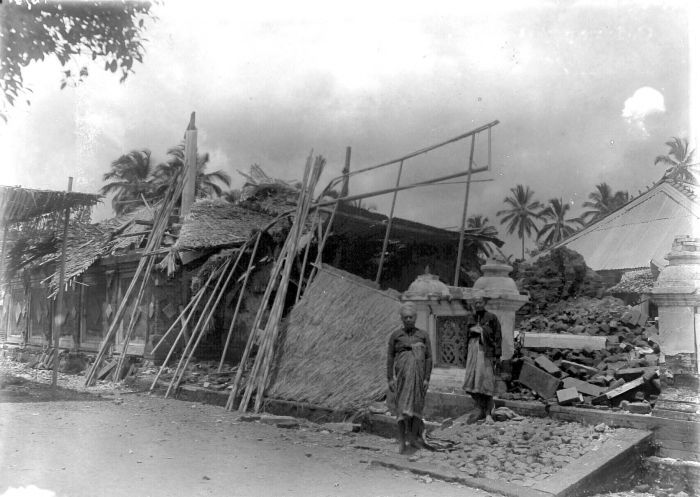
1917 Bali earthquake

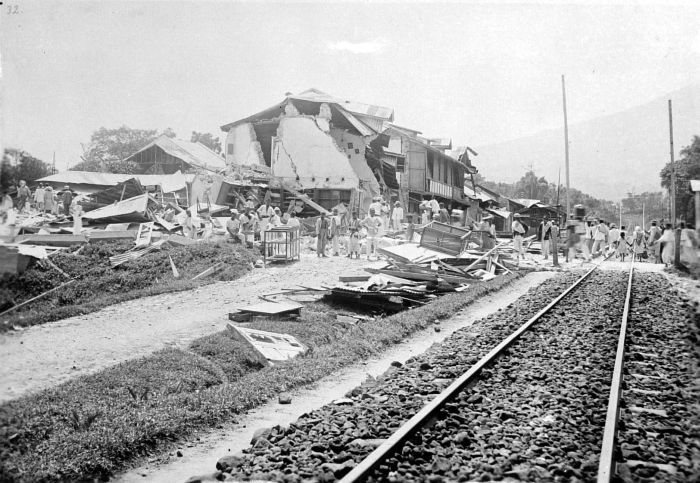
1926 Padang Panjang earthquake

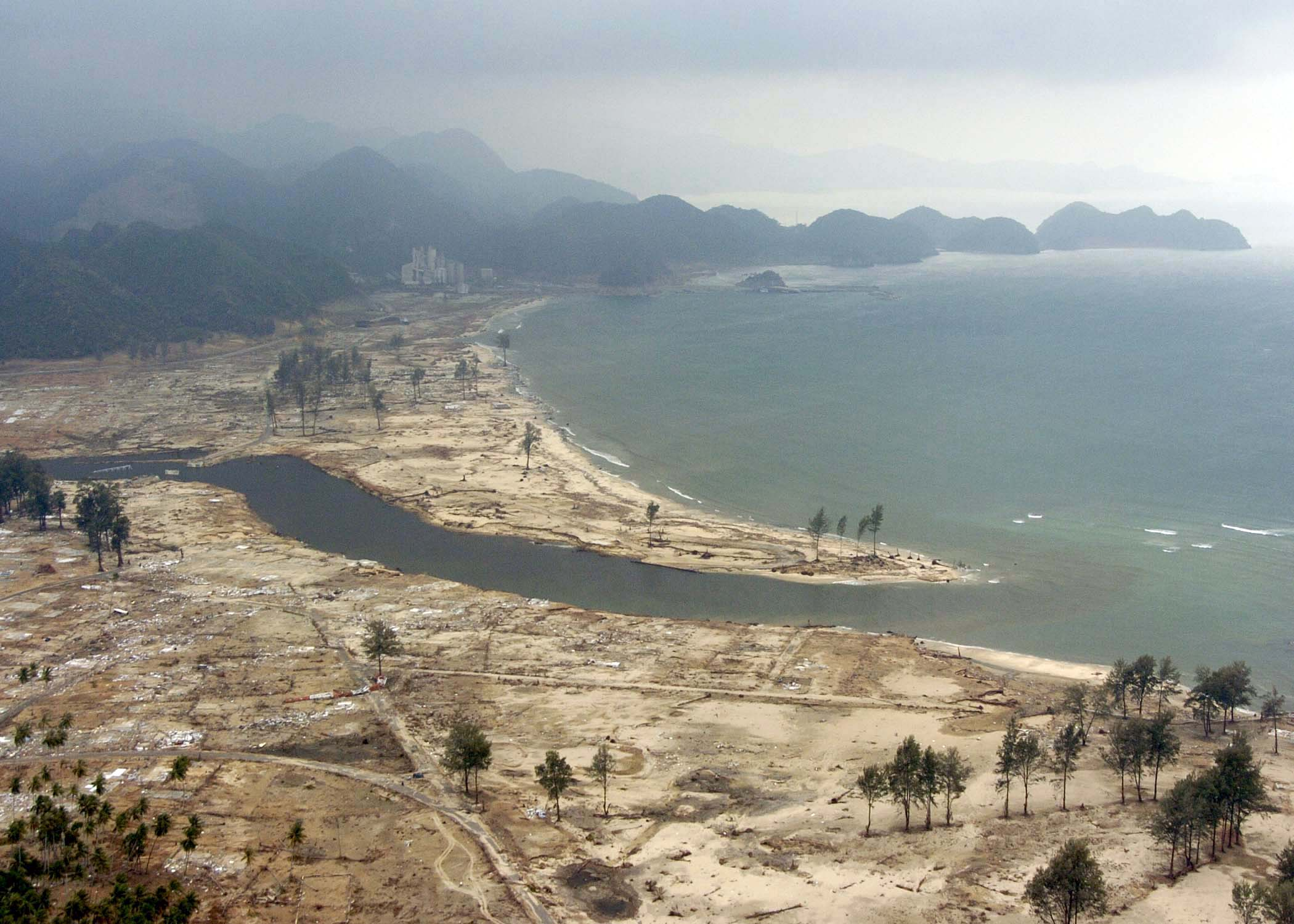
2004 Indian Ocean tsunami

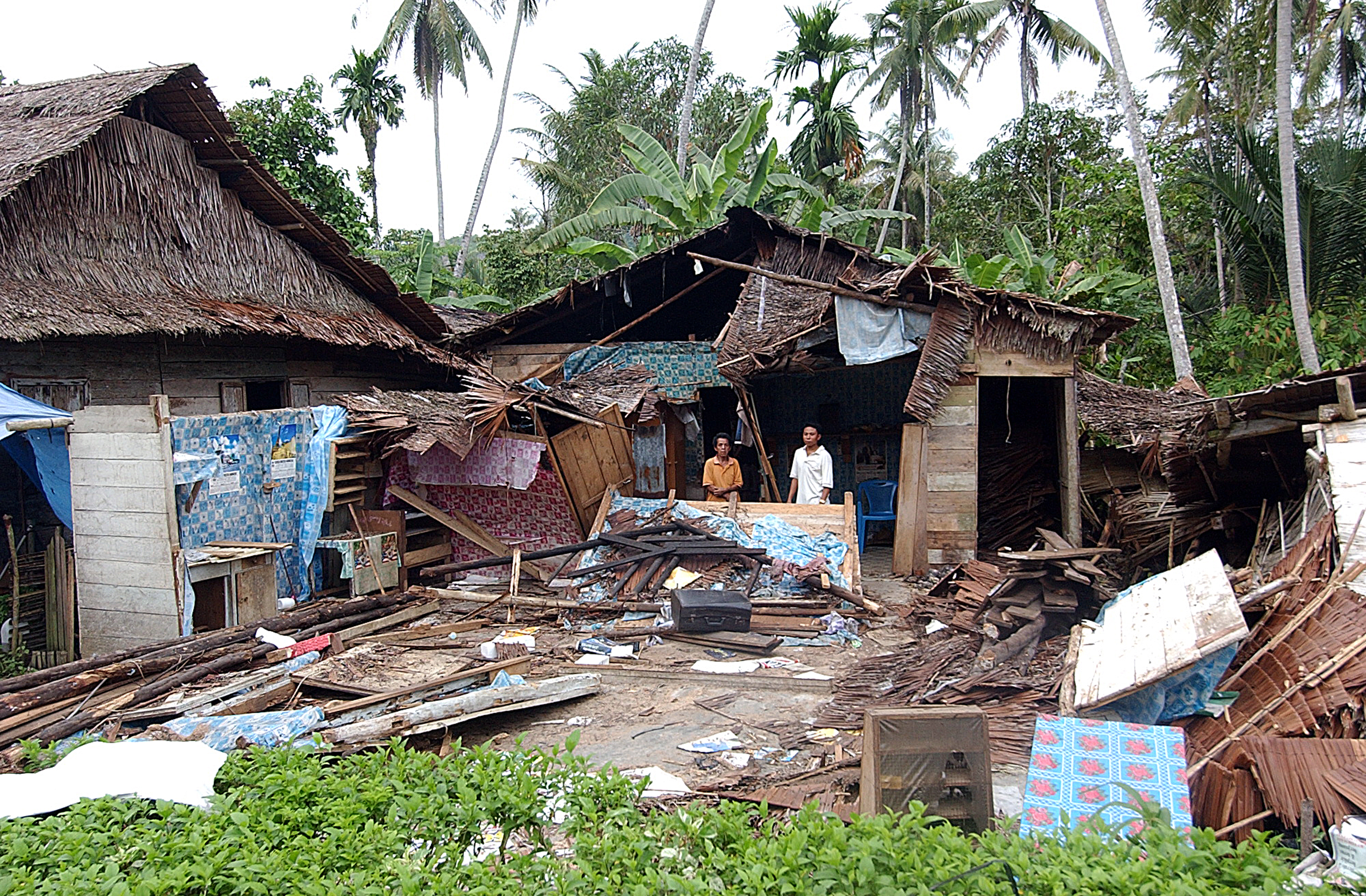
2005 Nias–Simeulue earthquake

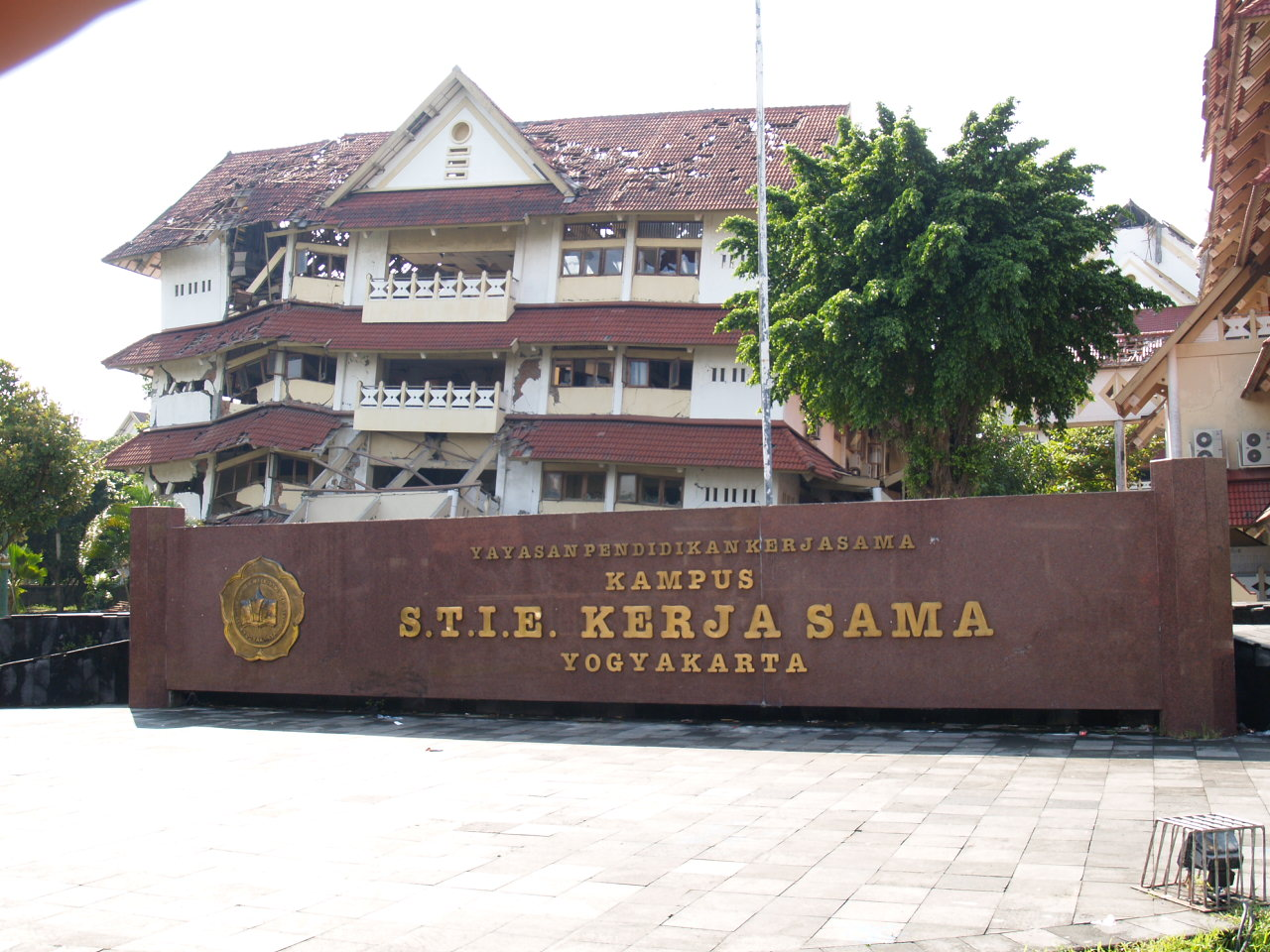
2006 Yogyakarta earthquake

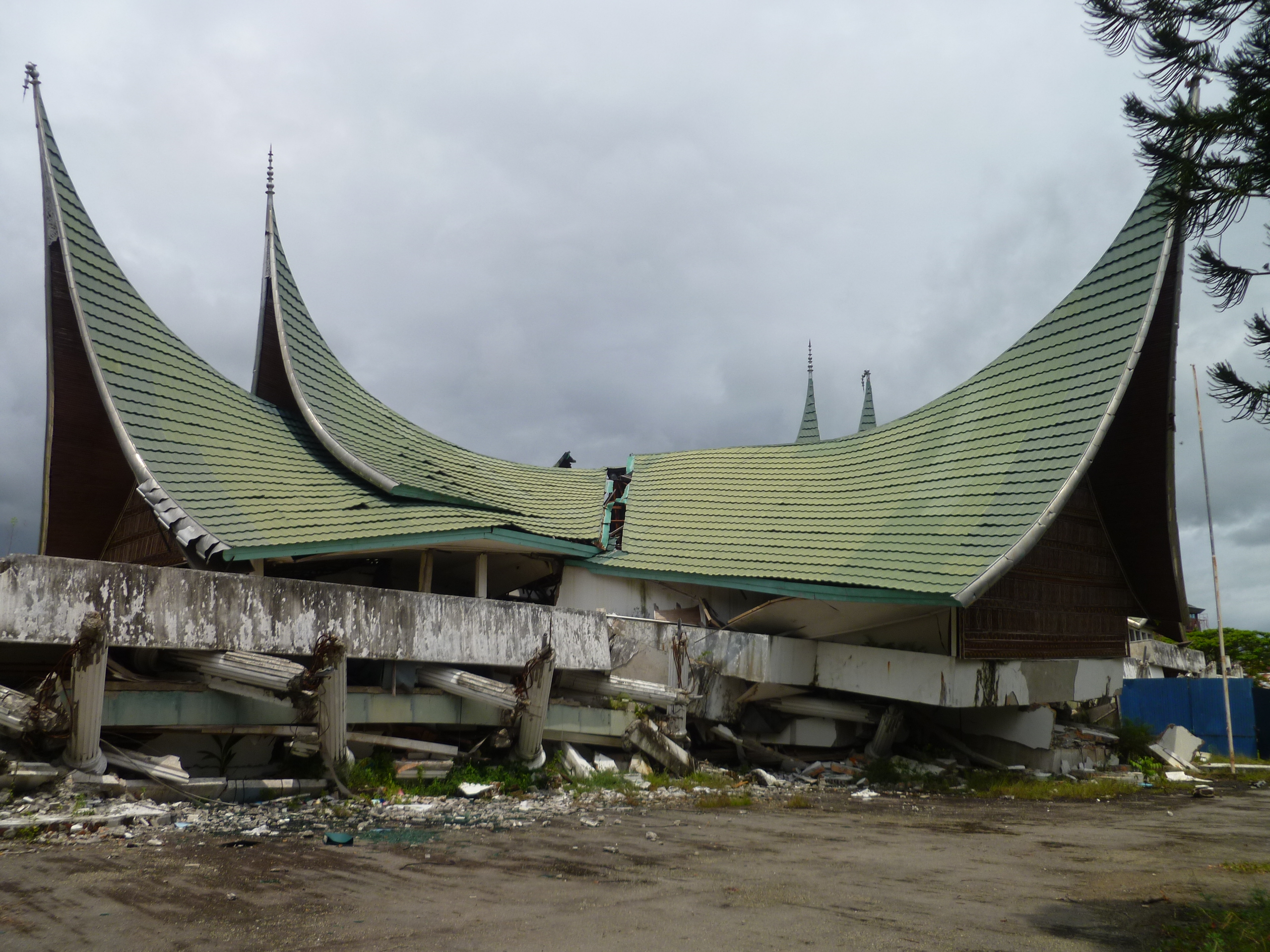
2009 Sumatra earthquakes

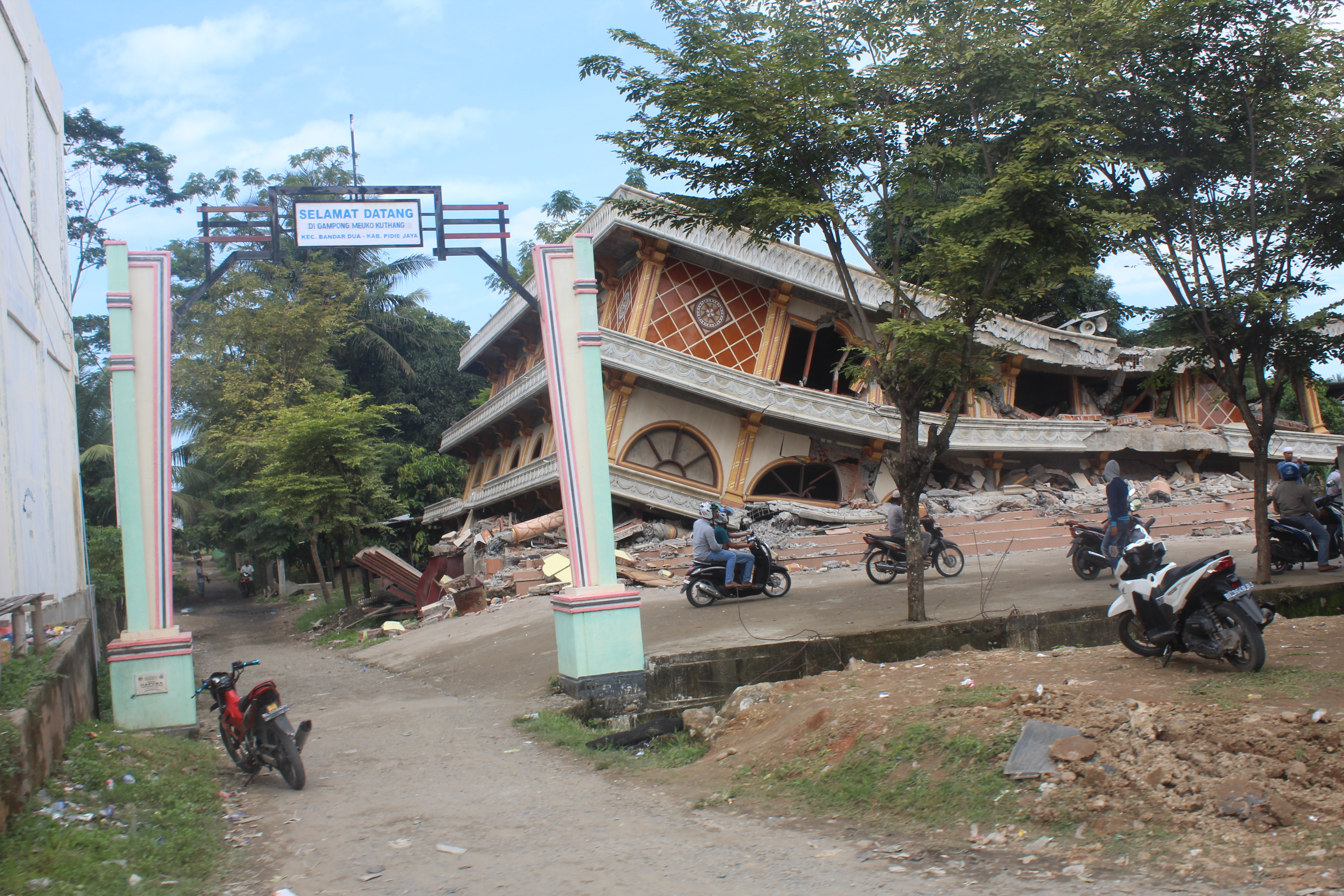
2016 Aceh earthquake

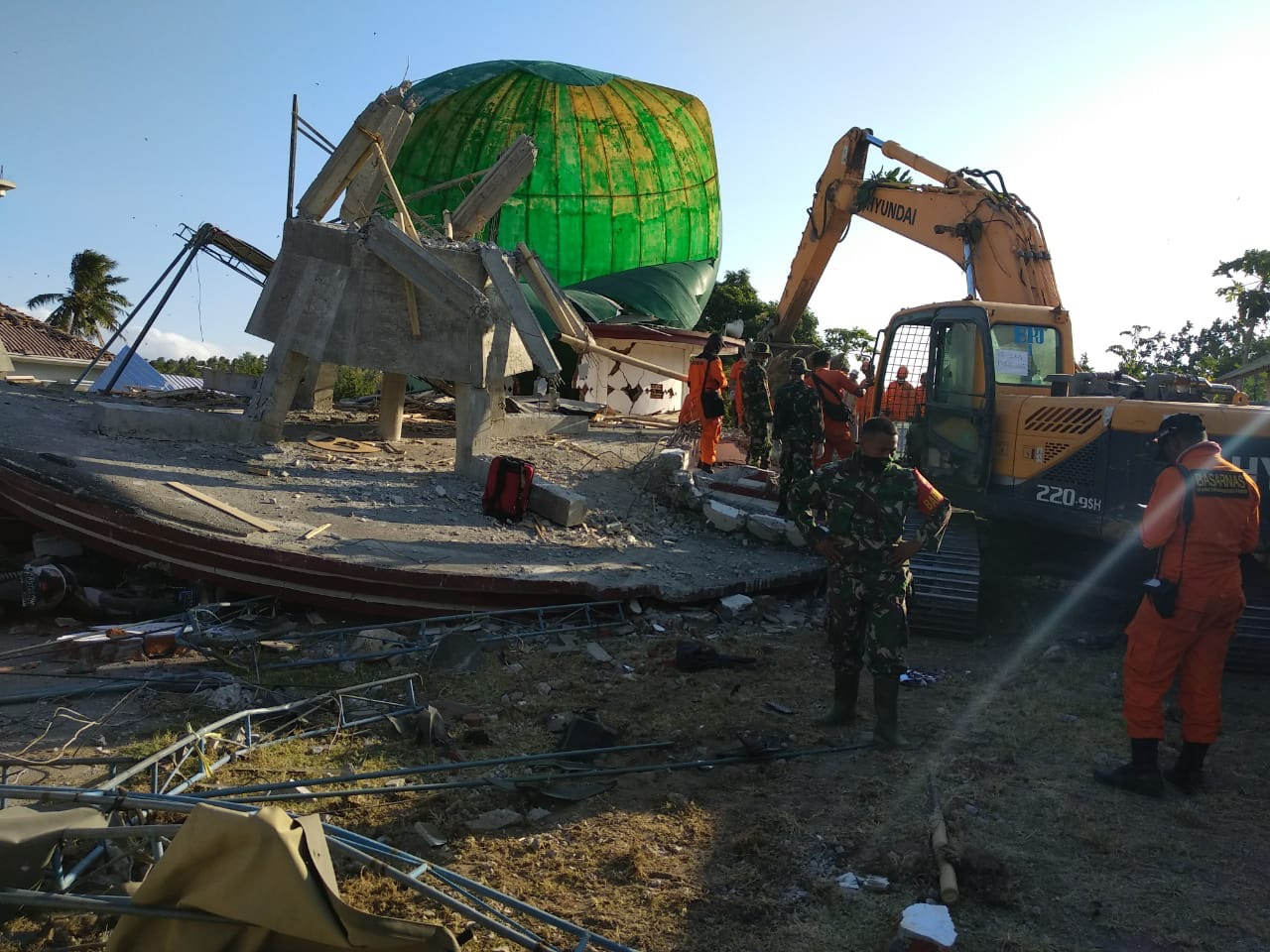
August 2018 Lombok earthquake

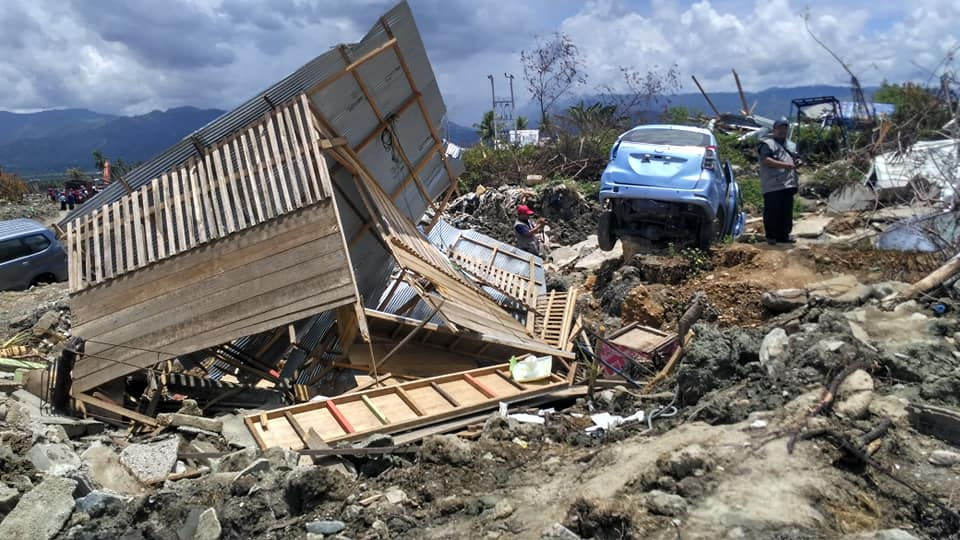
2018 Sulawesi earthquake and tsunami

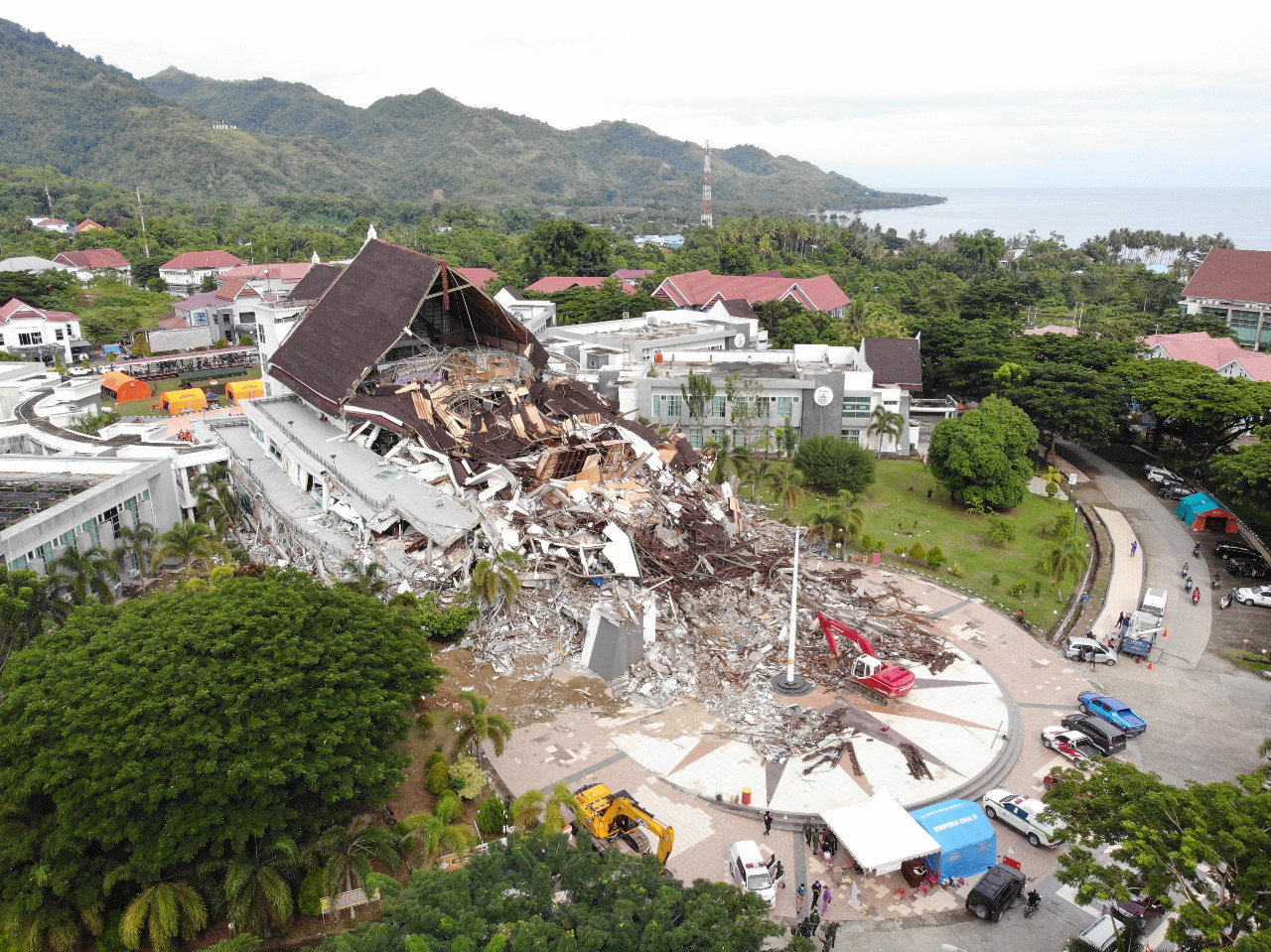
2021 West Sulawesi earthquake

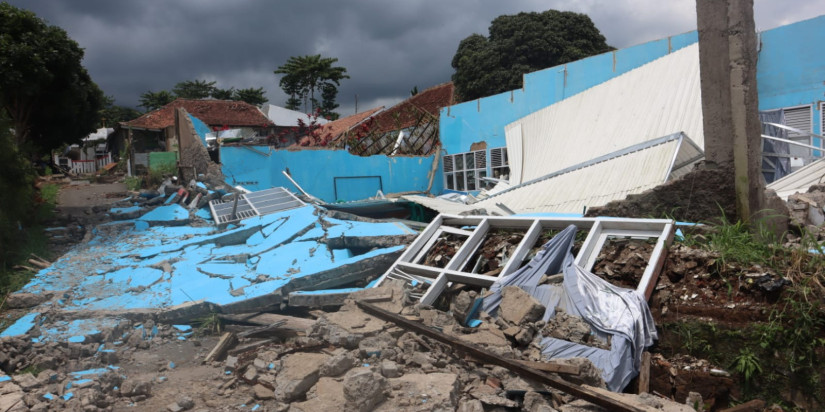
2022 West Java earthquake

== See also ==
- Eurasian plate
- Geology of Indonesia
- Indo-Australian plate
- Krakatoa
- List of faults in Indonesia
- List of historical earthquakes
- List of natural disasters in Indonesia
- List of tsunamis affecting Indonesia
- List of volcanoes in Indonesia
- Seismicity of the Sumatra coast
