= 1899 Ceram earthquake =

Earthquake in Indonesia

- Location within Maluku
- UTC time: 1899-09-29
- Local date: 30 September 1899
- Local time: 01:42 AM
- Magnitude: 7.8 M_{s}
- Epicenter: 3.29°S 128.65°E
- Max. intensity: EMS-98 VIII (Heavily damaging)
- Tsunami: 10 m (33 ft)
- Casualties: 3,864 fatalities

On 30 September 1899 the island of Ceram, Dutch East Indies, was struck by an M_{s} 7.8 earthquake which was accompanied by a 10-meter landslide-induced tsunami. According to the Batavian Magnetic and Meteorological Observatory, the shock occurred at 01:42 AM Amahei local time. The study about the quake and its effects was published by Dr. R. D. M. Verbeek in an article named Short Report about the earth- and sea-quake in Ceram, the 30th September 1899, which serves as the only extensive source on this earthquake.

== Earthquake and tsunamis ==
The Ceram earthquake is ranked among the tectonic quakes. The epicenter of the quake is shown in Figure 1. From there the quake spread in all directions. The most forceful spread went west and east, presumably through an old crack or tear in the Earth's crust.

The 1899 Ceram earthquake had nothing to do with the 1898 Ambon earthquake. The first-mentioned took place along one of the many concentric cracks, the latter one took place along a radial crack. The earthquake was especially heavy in the Elpaputih-bay. Presumably because, as calculations suggest, the epicenter of the shock was located in the mountains west of the bay. These calculations were confirmed by visual inspection of the mountain rocks, which showed signs of fracture and breaking due to the quake. The earthquake itself would not have been responsible for a lot of damage, were it not that the several parts of the shore broke off due to the quake and fell into the sea, creating a severe tsunami that flooded the shores and the nearby located villages.

== Effects ==
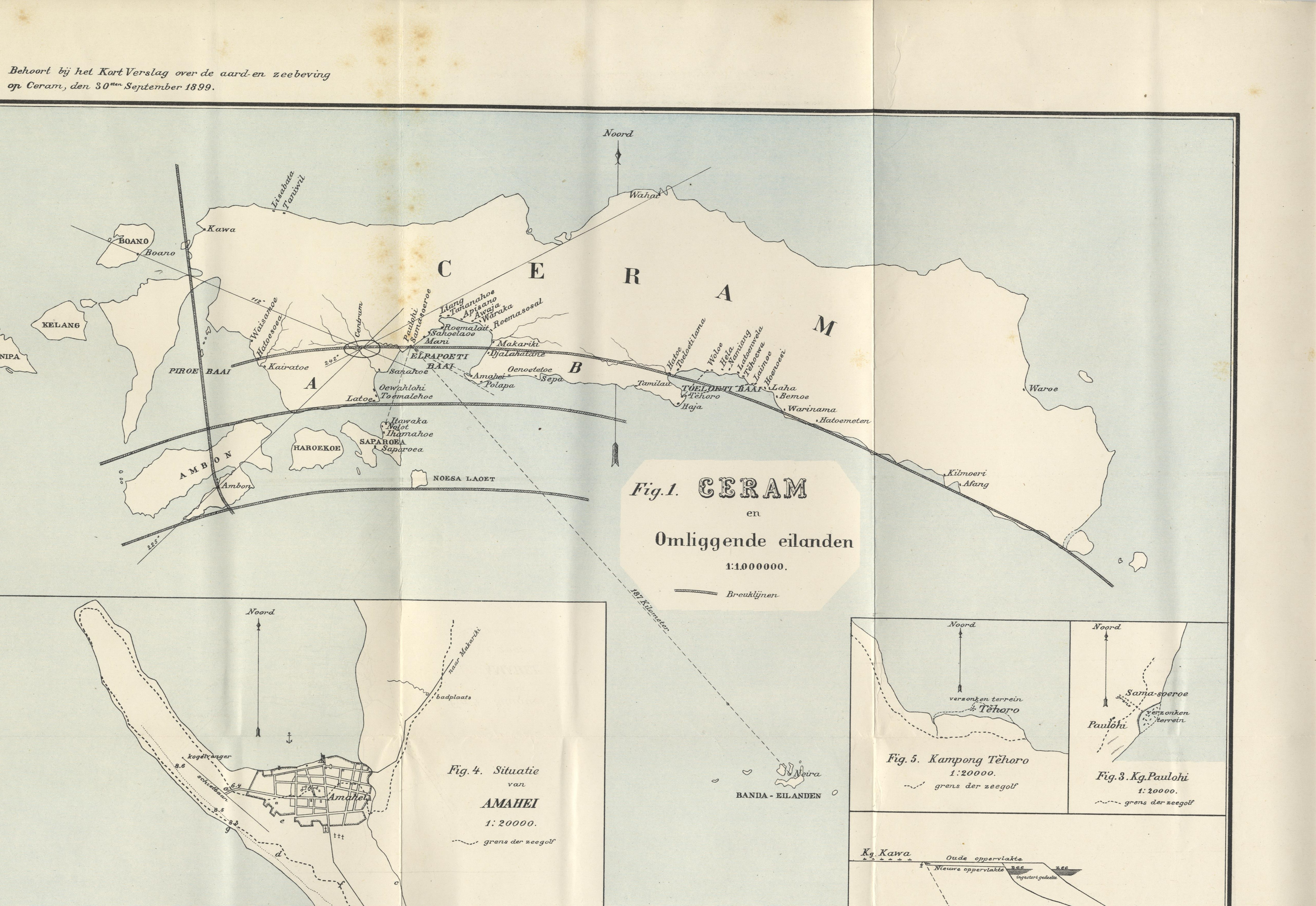
Figure 1. A map that shows the epicenter of the Ceram earthquake.

The devastating tsunami took 3,864 lives and swept away several villages completely. The areas that were struck hardest were all located on, or near, the Ceram fracture line and included Hatusua (Piru-bay area), Paulohy-Samasuru and Makariki (Elpaputih-bay area), Tehoru, Wolu and Laimu (Taluti-bay area).

=== Piru-bay area ===
Only the east side suffered damage from a single-wave tsunami which destroyed village of Hatusua. A 2.4-meter tall wave which travelled 203 metres (666 ft) inland swept away the village in its entirety.

=== Elpaputih-bay area ===
Like at Piru-bay, the most severe damage was suffered on the east-side of the bay (Paulohy-Samasuru and Mani were the only west-side villages that were struck). Here, the shore broke off, creating a 9-meter wave flooding land inward for 170 m. 2400 people's lives were taken by the tsunami in this area.

=== Taluti-bay area ===
Here, the west side of the bay suffered the greatest impact. At the Tehoru shore, a 'land-sliding' occurred, which created a flood that flooded the entire Tehoru village as well as parts of the nearby Wolu and Laimu villages.

== Dr. R. D. M. Verbeek's study ==
Rogier Verbeek was a Dutch geologist and natural scientist, located in the Dutch Indies due to his work for the Royal Dutch Geography Society. Therefore, his work is part of a broader scholarly effort to get a better understanding of the geography of the Dutch colonies. In that time, the focus was mainly on the micro-geography of certain Dutch areas. This case study tries to give an overview of the cause and impact of the 1899 earthquake and tsunami, indexing the specifics of the natural disaster for the entire Ceram area. However, Verbeek's presence in the Dutch Indies was not merely scholarly in nature. There was also an imperialistic incentive to have Dutch scholars located in Dutch colonies. As the first president of the Royal Dutch Geography Society, P.J. Veth, stated, it was also a matter of pursuing and maintaining the Dutch glory, in a cultural-nationalistic sense. Dutch scholarly presence in the Indies was therefore not merely scientific, but also part of a colonial effort based on the idea of a 'Greater Holland'.

== See also ==
- List of earthquakes in Indonesia
- List of historical earthquakes
