= 1834 Java earthquake =

Earthquake on the island of Java in 1834

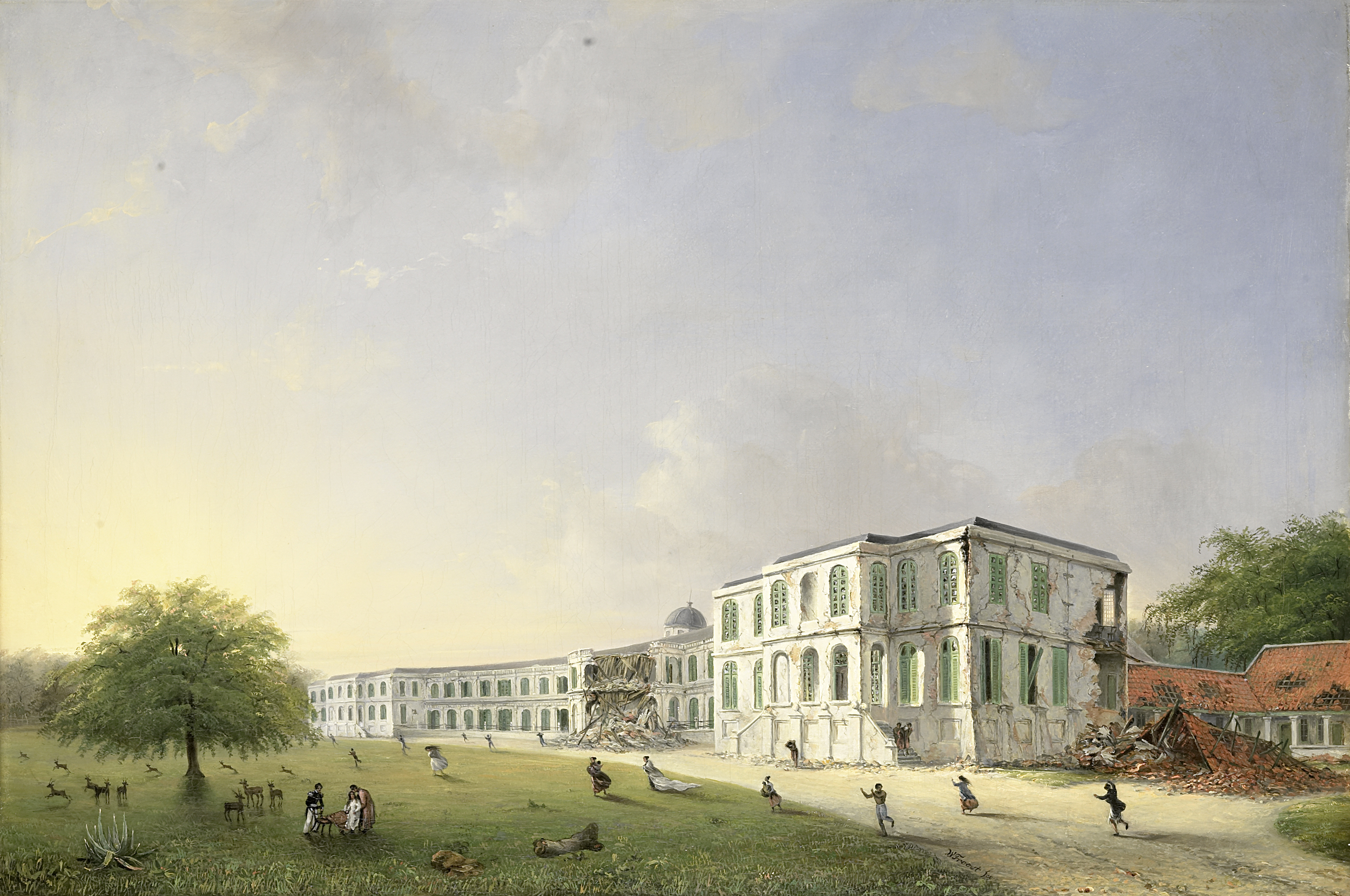
- Illustration of damage in Bogor Palace after earthquake

- Location within Java Location within Indonesia
- Local date: October 11, 1834
- Magnitude: M_{w} 7.0
- Depth: 12 km (7.5 mi)
- Epicenter: 6.470°S 106.958°E; Java, Dutch East Indies
- Fault: Java Back Arc Thrust
- Type: Thrust
- Areas affected: Java
- Max. intensity: MMI IX (Violent)
- Tsunami: No
- Landslides: Yes
- Casualties: 5 dead

The 1834 Java earthquake struck the Dutch East Indies (present-day Indonesia) island of Java, in the city of Bogor. The earthquake occurred on the morning of October 11, 1834. It was assigned VIII (Severe) to IX (Violent) on the Modified Mercalli intensity scale.

== Description ==
It was preceded by a number of strongly felt foreshocks the night before on October 11. When the mainshock struck the next morning, it was violently felt. Vibrations were also detected by people as far as Tegal in Central Java and Lampung on the neighboring island of Sumatra.

Although the earthquake caused very few deaths and injuries, it severely damaged many and collapsed a few. Damage to roads such as cracks were reported from Bogor to Cianjur, Cianjur Regency. Many warehouses and factories were also badly affected. A postal station in the city was buried under a landslide, killing five people and ten horses. Many homes and stone building in Batavia were damaged. A country warehouse and a number of townhouses were also damaged. The Bogor Palace in the city, which was the residence of Jean Chrétien Baud, Governor-General of the Dutch East Indies, was so severely damaged that Jean Chrétien Baud ordered it be demolished. The palace was rebuilt with a new 19th century European architecture style.

== Earthquake ==
Modeling the earthquake with a moment magnitude (M_{w}) of 7.0 at a depth of 12 km along a 45-km-long reverse fault known as the Baribis Fault was consistent with the historical descriptions about the earthquake and its effects. In the simulation of ground motions, Batavia, Buitenzorg, Tjanjor, and Tjiandjawar suffered the most intense shaking, at IX on the Mercalli intensity scale. The simulation also predicted severe to violent shaking in Banten, Karawang, and Tegal but no descriptions of extensive damage was reported there, possibly due to historical bias.

== Future hazard ==
A simulation estimates that if an earthquake of the same intensity occurred today it would cause around 40,000 deaths.

== See also ==
- List of earthquakes in Indonesia
