= Volcanism of Indonesia =

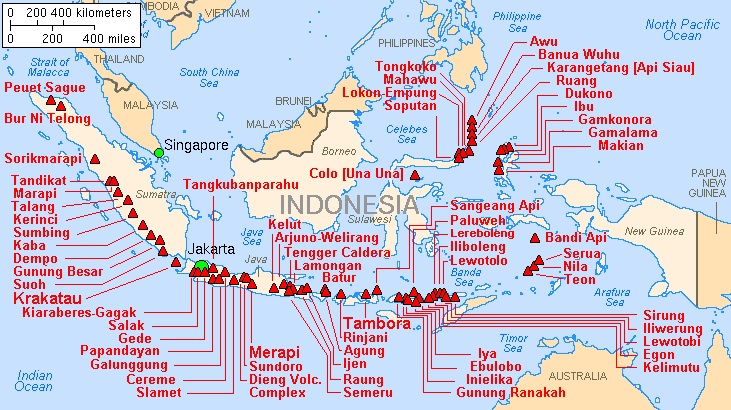
Map of volcanoes in Indonesia

Indonesia is a volcanically active country, containing numerous major volcanoes. With 76 volcanoes that have erupted at least 1,171 times in total within historical times. The Smithsonian Institution has 141 Indonesian entries in its volcano database. Indonesia has around 130 active volcanoes that are part of the Pacific Ring of Fire, and it has suffered the highest numbers of eruptions resulting in fatalities, damage to arable land, debris flows, tsunamis, lava domes, and pyroclastic flows. Indonesia's most active volcanoes are Kelut and Mount Merapi on the island of Java. The majority of Indonesia's volcano are located on a 3,000 km long chain called the Sunda Arc. Here, the subduction of the Indian Ocean crust underneath the Asian Plate produced most of these volcanoes.

== Volcanic eruptions ==
The most severe eruptions on Earth in historical times took place in Indonesia. In 1815, the giant eruption of Mount Tambora, a stratovolcano, became the largest known eruption in the world during historical times, and it had such a large effect on the climate that the following year, 1816, in Europe was known as the year without summer. 40 km^{3} of ash were produced as a result of the eruption combined with the collapse of the caldera. About 90,000 people were killed as a result of Mt. Tambora's 1815 eruption, about 10,000 directly from the eruption and about 80,000 from crop loss and famine. In 1883, the catastrophic eruption of Krakatoa, a volcanic island in Lampung, which registered as a 6 on the Volcanic Explosivity Index (VEI), and the tsunamis that ensued killed about 36,000 people, and approximately two-thirds of the original island was destroyed as well. The 2010 the eruption of Mount Merapi, a stratovolcano, began in late October and continued into November. This eruption had a VEI of 4, and it also released a sulfur dioxide cloud between 12,000 and 15,000 m into the upper troposphere.

== Preparation ==
In 1920, the Volcanological Survey of Indonesia was created in order to investigate, record, and warn people about volcanoes within the Indonesian region. This group has helped aid in the evacuation of people living near Indonesian volcanoes since it was formed. For example, during the 1982 eruption of Galunggung, which had a Volcanic Explosivity Index of 4, 75,000 people were evacuated and 68 people died, and in 1988, 15,000 people were evacuated and there were no fatalities during the eruption of Makian.

== See also ==
- List of volcanoes in Indonesia
- Geothermal power in Indonesia
