= 2010 Banyak Islands earthquake =

Earthquake in Indonesia

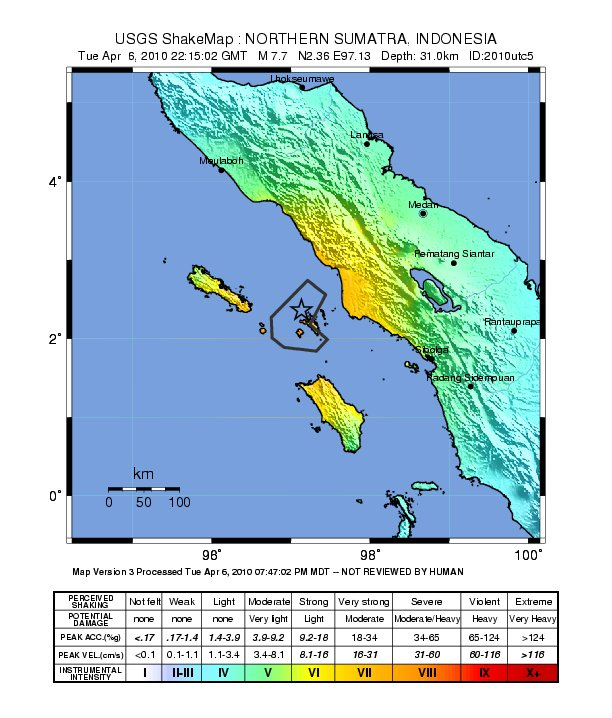
- UTC time: 2010-04-06 22:15:01
- ISC event: 600296664
- USGS-ANSS: ComCat
- Local date: April 7, 2010
- Local time: 05:15 (WIB (Indonesia Western Standard Time))
- Magnitude: 7.8 M_{w}
- Depth: 31 km (19 mi)
- Epicenter: 2.38°N 97.05°E
- Type: Thrust
- Areas affected: Indonesia
- Max. intensity: MMI V (Moderate)
- Casualties: 62 injured

The 2010 Banyak Islands earthquake occurred on April 7 at 5:15 AM local time with a moment magnitude of 7.8 and a maximum Mercalli intensity of V (Moderate). The shock occurred near the Banyak Islands, off the island of Sumatra in Indonesia. A tsunami watch was issued according to the Pacific Tsunami Warning Center in Honolulu which was later canceled. A 40 cm surge was reported in the Banyak Islands an hour after the quake, along with 62 injuries. Power outages were reported throughout the province of North Sumatra as well as in Aceh. This quake is one in a sequence of large earthquakes along the Sunda megathrust in the 2000s.

In Simeulue Regency, 21 were hospitalized at Gunung Putih, Teluk Dalam subdistrict, and 41 were injured in Teupah Selatan subdistrict. Some of the injured were treated at Simeulue general hospital in Sinabang.

== See also ==
- 2007 Bengkulu earthquakes
- 2010 Mentawai earthquake and tsunami
- List of earthquakes in 2010
- List of earthquakes in Indonesia
- March 2007 Sumatra earthquakes
