= 2013 Aceh earthquake =

Earthquake in Aceh Province, Indonesia

- Location within Sumatra
- UTC time: 2013-07-02 07:37:02
- ISC event: 603173687
- USGS-ANSS: ComCat
- Local date: 2 July 2013
- Local time: 2:37pm (UTC+7)
- Duration: 15 seconds
- Magnitude: 6.1 M_{w}
- Depth: 10 km (6 mi)
- Epicenter: 4.698°N 96.687°E
- Type: Strike-slip
- Areas affected: Indonesia
- Total damage: 4,292 houses damaged
- Max. intensity: MMI VI (Strong)
- Landslides: Yes
- Aftershocks: 4.3, 5.5, 5.2 M_{w}
- Casualties: 43 dead, 6 missing, 2,532 injured

On 2 July 2013, an earthquake struck the Indonesian island of Sumatra with a moment magnitude of 6.1 and a maximum Mercalli intensity of VI (Strong). The strike-slip earthquake killed at least 43 people and injured more than 2,500 others in the province of Aceh (on the northern end of Sumatra) where approximately 4,300 homes were damaged or destroyed.

== Background ==
Earthquakes are common in Sumatra as it lies at the convergent boundary where the Sunda plate is subducting beneath the Indo-Australian plate. The plates are converging obliquely at a rate of 60 mm per year and the right lateral component is accommodated by strike-slip faulting within Sumatra, mainly on the Great Sumatran fault. In 2004, Sumatra was devastated by the Sumatra–Andaman earthquake and resulting tsunami that killed tens of thousands in the area and 230,000 people around the Indian Ocean. In 2009, an earthquake near Padang on Sumatra killed more than 1,000. In April 2012, an 8.6-magnitude quake killed five people in Aceh.

== Earthquake characteristics ==
At 2:37pm local time (07:37 UTC) on 2 July 2013, a 6.1 magnitude earthquake struck at a depth of 10 kilometres (6.2 mi) with an epicenter near Sumatra's northwestern tip, 55 kilometres (34 mi) south of Bireun. The quake lasted approximately 15 seconds and was felt from regional capital Banda Aceh to Bener Meriah. The quake was powerful enough to cause concern in Banda Aceh, 320 miles (510 km) from the epicenter, and shaking was felt as far as Malaysia. At least fifteen aftershocks occurred, with three powerful ones registering magnitudes of 4.3, 5.5 and 5.2.

The earthquake had a strike-slip mechanism involving either left lateral slip on a SW-NE trending fault or right lateral slip on a NW-SE trending fault. Analysis of the aftershock distribution and GPS data highlighted two fault segments, the right lateral Pantan Terong segment and the previously unrecognised left lateral Celala segment, both forming part of the overall Great Sumatran fault system. The best-fit model indicates that the Celala segment was responsible for the earthquake, although aftershocks and some of the post-seismic slip occurred on the Pantan Terong segment.

== Damage ==
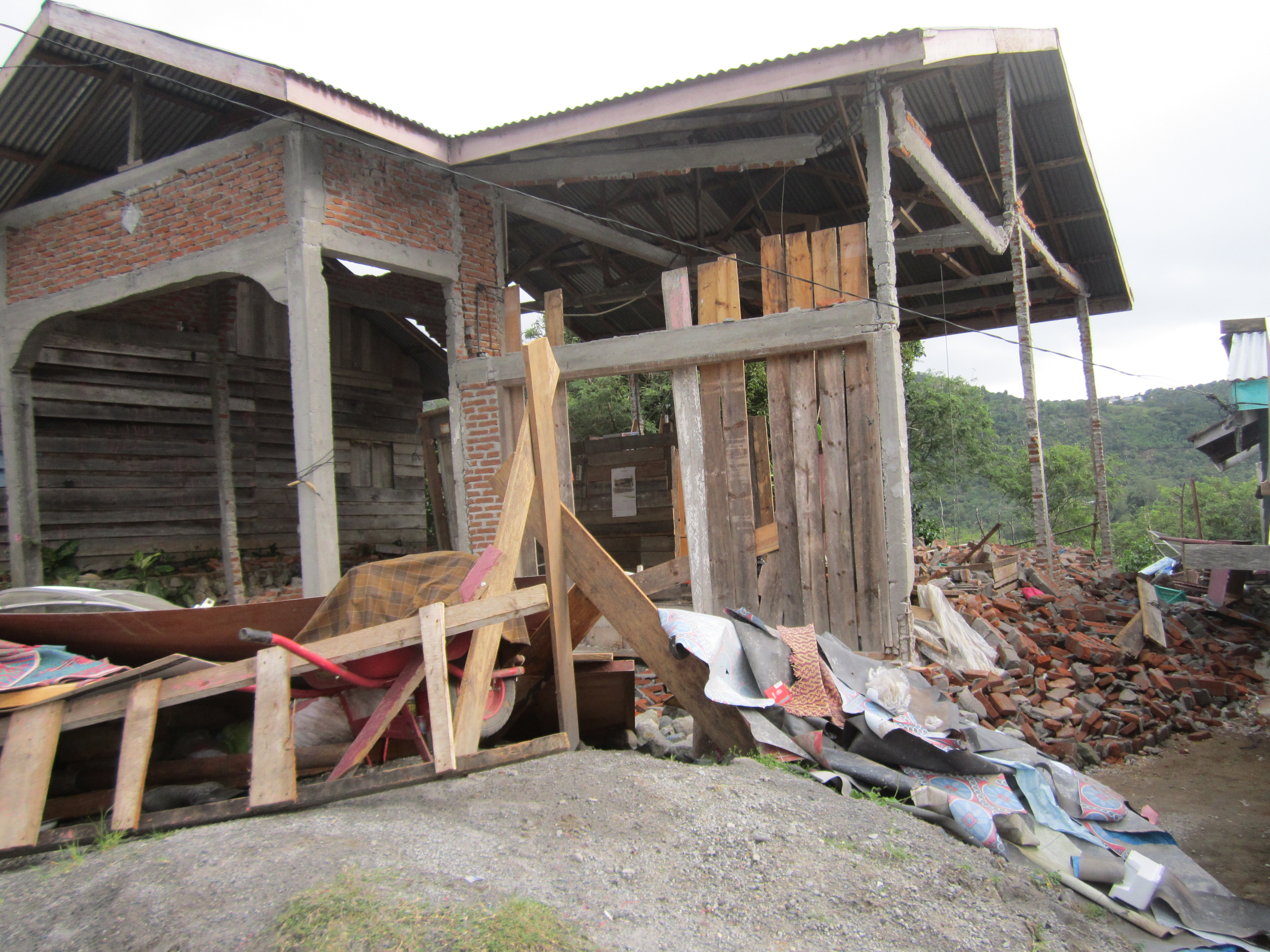
A damaged house

As of 19 July, the official death toll stood at 43, with six people still missing. A further 2,532 people were injured. The Bener Meriah and Central Aceh districts were hardest hit by the quake.

In Bener Meriah, eight deaths were reported. More than 100 people were hospitalized due to their injuries and 537 houses were badly damaged in the district. A further 252 houses suffered minor damage. Several hundred residents slept outdoors the night of 2 July, afraid to return to their homes for fear of aftershocks. "There were strong aftershocks last night and people didn’t want to go back home, so they stayed in the open overnight," commented an official, "but we don’t have enough tents".

In Central Aceh, 35 deaths were reported. A mosque collapse killed six children and trapped 14 others. Rescuers dug through the rubble throughout the night of 2–3 July, but did not locate any of the trapped children. Numerous landslides occurred in the district and 1,368 houses were destroyed. A further 2,135 houses suffered minor damaged. On 3 July, a local official commented "People are still frightened, especially after the aftershocks last night. Nobody dared to stay at home. Everyone slept on the roads or in car parks." The main hospital was overcrowded with patients, causing tents to be set up outside to handle the overflow.

== Response ==
A government plane and helicopter were sent in to assist local police and soldiers in rescue efforts. Several roads were destroyed in the quake or blocked by landslides, hampering rescue efforts. Power and cell phone tower outages made communications difficult. Three truckloads of bottled water, food, and other supplies were dispatched to the region. The Aceh Disaster Mitigation Office said more help would be provided when they had better data on what was needed.

On 3 July 40 billion rupiah (approximately US$4 million) was allocated for emergency relief efforts. A one-week emergency response period, which can be extended if necessary, was enacted in Bener Meriah. Five shelters were set up in Bener Meriah and 10 in Central Aceh.

== See also ==
- List of earthquakes in 2013
- List of earthquakes in Indonesia
