= List of tsunamis affecting Indonesia =

There have been many tsunamis involving the territory that is now Indonesia.

== List ==
List of significant tsunamis in Indonesia
Event	Date	Location	Summary	Notes
1797 Sumatra earthquake	10 February 1797	Padang	Tsunami localized to Padang, Sumatra, Indonesia	
1833 Sumatra earthquake	25 November 1833	Sumatra	Tsunami along the southwest coast of Sumatra	
1861 Sumatra earthquake	16 February 1861	Sumatra	Tsunami along the northwest coast of Sumatra	
1883 eruption of Krakatoa	27 August 1883	Krakatoa	Collapse of Krakatoa caused tsunami sweeping over neighbouring islands and onto Sumatra and Java	
1992 Flores earthquake and tsunami	12 December 1992	Flores	1,490 deaths in Maumere and 700 in Babi Island.	3–4 metres wave run up heights occurred along the eastern coasts of Maumere, Maximum run up height of 26 metres (85 feet) at Riangkroko village.
1994 Java earthquake	3 June 1994	Eastern coasts of Java, Bali	250 deaths caused by tsunami.	Run up heights of 14 metres on Eastern Java coast, 5 metres on Bali coasts.
2004 Indian Ocean earthquake and tsunami	26 December 2004	Aceh	Large earthquake near Aceh, Sumatra, Indonesia causing a transoceanic tsunami	One of the deadliest natural disasters in recorded history, with a death toll of 227,898.
2006 Pangandaran earthquake and tsunami	17 July 2006	South and west coasts of West Java and Central Java	668 deaths occurred as a result of a tsunami which inundated 300 km of coast line on the southern Java coast.	
2010 Mentawai earthquake and tsunami	25 October 2010	Mentawai Islands	Tsunami swept the coastal areas of the Mentawai Islands, off the west coast of Sumatra	
2018 Sulawesi earthquake and tsunami	28 September 2018	Palu	Large earthquake near Donggala caused a tsunami that funneled into a bay rising high at Palu, Sulawesi, Indonesia	
2018 Sunda Strait tsunami	22 December 2018	Banten – Lampung	Eruption of the Anak Krakatau volcano in the Sunda Strait caused a tsunami and landslide	

== See also ==
- List of disasters in Indonesia
- List of tsunamis
