= Sumatra earthquake =

Sumatra earthquake may refer to:

- 1797 Sumatra earthquake
- 1833 Sumatra earthquake
- 1861 Sumatra earthquake
- 1931 Southwest Sumatra earthquake
- 1933 Sumatra earthquake
- 1935 Sumatra earthquake
- 1984 Northern Sumatra earthquake
- 2002 Sumatra earthquake
- March 2007 Sumatra earthquakes
- 2009 Sumatra earthquake
- 2016 Sumatra earthquake
- 2022 Sumatra earthquake

== See also ==
- 1943 Alahan Panjang earthquakes
- 2000 Enggano earthquake
- 2004 Indian Ocean earthquake and tsunami
- 2005 Nias–Simeulue earthquake
- 2007 Bengkulu earthquakes
- 2008 Simeulue earthquake
- 2010 Banyak Islands earthquake
- 2011 Aceh Singkil Regency earthquakes
- 2013 Aceh earthquake
- 2016 Aceh earthquake
- List of earthquakes in Indonesia
