= Sunda Trench =

Oceanic trench in the Indian Ocean

Coordinates: 10°19′S 109°58′E

Oceanic crust is formed at the mid-oceanic ridge, while the lithosphere is subducted back into the asthenosphere at trenches like that of Sunda Trench.

The Sunda Trench, earlier known as and sometimes still indicated as the Java Trench, is an oceanic trench located in the Indian Ocean near Sumatra, formed where the Australian-Capricorn plates subduct under a part of the Eurasian plate. It is 3,200 kilometres (2,000 mi) long with a maximum depth of 7,290 metres (23,920 ft). Its maximum depth is the deepest point in the Indian Ocean. The trench stretches from the Lesser Sunda Islands past Java, around the southern coast of Sumatra to the Andaman Islands, and forms the boundary between the Indo-Australian plate and Eurasian plate (more specifically, Sunda plate). The trench is considered to be part of the Alpide belt as well as one of oceanic trenches around the northern edges of the Australian plate.

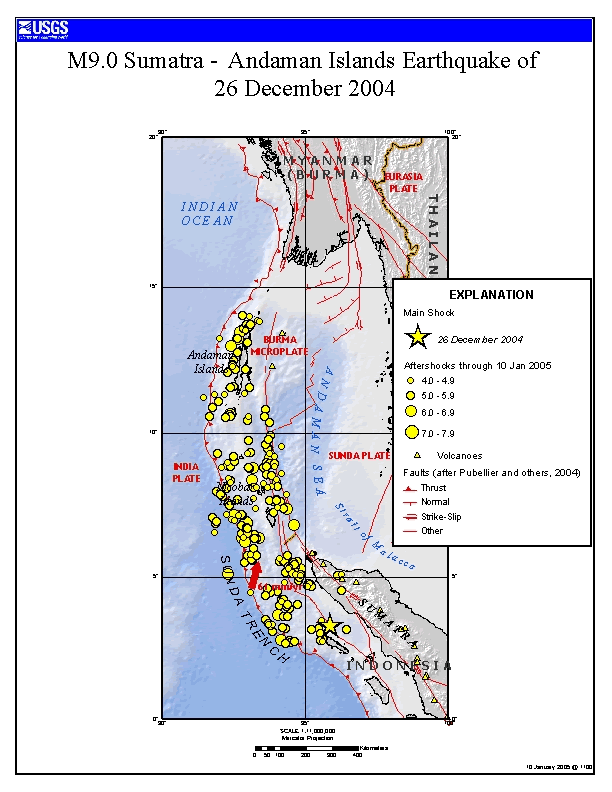
Sunda Trench and the epicenters along it, due to the subduction process where the India Plate subducts under the continental fragments of the eastern microplates.

In 2005, scientists found evidence that the 2004 earthquake in the area of the Sunda Trench could lead to further catastrophic shifting within a relatively short period, perhaps less than a decade. This threat has resulted in international agreements to establish a tsunami warning system in place along the Indian Ocean coast.

== Characteristics ==
For about half its length, off of Sumatra, it is divided into two parallel troughs by an underwater ridge, and much of the trench is at least partially filled with sediments. Mappings after the 2004 Indian Ocean earthquake of the plate boundary showed a resemblance to suspension bridge cables, with peaks and sags, indicative of asperity and locked faults, instead of the traditional wedge shape expected.

== Exploration ==
Some of the earliest explorations of the trench occurred in the late 1950s when Robert L. Fisher, a research geologist at the Scripps Institution of Oceanography, investigated the trench as part of a worldwide scientific field exploration of the world's ocean floor and sub-oceanic crustal structure. Bomb-sounding, echo-train analysis, and manometer were some of the techniques used to determine the depth of the trench. The research contributed to an understanding of the subduction characteristic of the Pacific margins. Various agencies have explored the trench in the aftermath of the 2004 earthquake, and these explorations have revealed extensive changes in the ocean floor.

=== Crewed descent ===
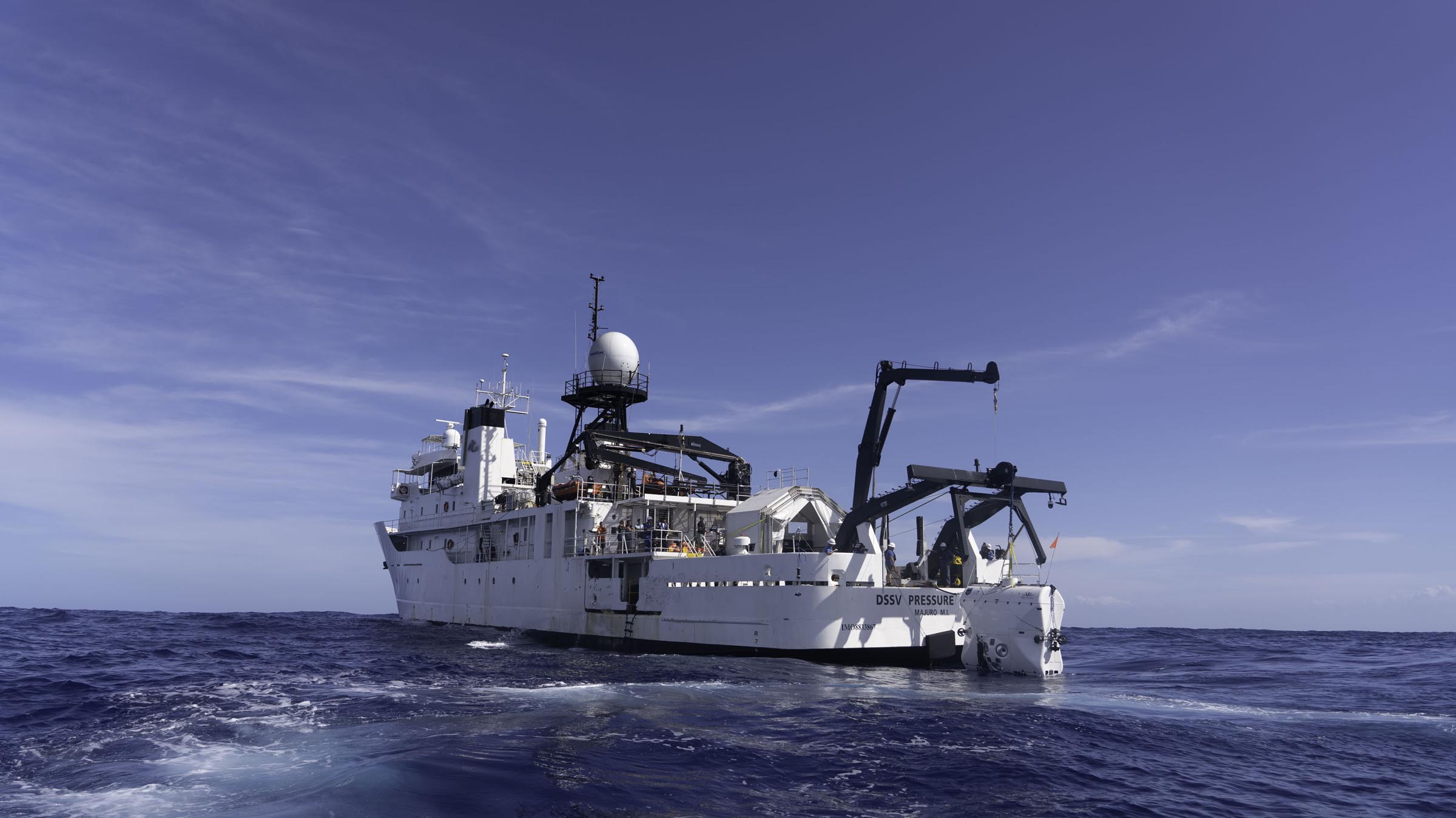
Deep Submersible Support Vessel DSSV Pressure Drop and DSV Limiting Factor at its stern

On 5 April 2019 Victor Vescovo made the first crewed descent to the deepest point of the trench in the Deep-Submergence Vehicle Limiting Factor (a Triton 36000/2 model submersible) and measured a depth of 7,192 m (23,596 ft) ±13 m (43 ft) by direct CTD pressure measurements at 11°7'44" S, 114°56'30" E, about 500 km (310 miles) south of Bali. The operating area was surveyed by the support ship, the Deep Submersible Support Vessel DSSV Pressure Drop, with a Kongsberg SIMRAD EM124 multibeam echosounder system. The gathered data was donated to the GEBCO Seabed 2030 initiative. The dive was part of the Five Deeps Expedition. The objective of this expedition is to thoroughly map and visit the deepest points of all five of the world's oceans by the end of September 2019.

To resolve the debate regarding the deepest point of the Indian Ocean, the Diamantina fracture zone was surveyed by the Five Deeps Expedition in March 2019, recording a maximum water depth of 7,019 m (23,028 ft) ±17 m (56 ft) at 33°37'52" S, 101°21'14" E for the Dordrecht Deep. This confirmed that the Sunda Trench was indeed deeper than the deepest location in the Diamantina Fracture Zone.

== Associated seismicity ==
The subduction of the Indo-Australian plate beneath a bloc of the Eurasian plate is associated with numerous earthquakes. Several of these earthquakes are notable for their size, associated tsunamis, and/or the number of fatalities they caused.

=== Sumatra segment ===
- 1797 Sumatra earthquake: magnitude 8.6–8.8
- 1833 Sumatra earthquake: magnitude 8.8–9.2
- 1861 Sumatra earthquake: magnitude ~8.5
- 1935 Sumatra earthquake: magnitude 7.7
- 2000 Enggano earthquake: magnitude 7.9
- 2002 Sumatra earthquake: A magnitude 7.3 earthquake that occurred at the boundary between the rupture areas of the 2004 and 2005 earthquakes listed below.
- 2004 Indian Ocean earthquake and tsunami: Mw 9.2–9.3
- 2005 Nias–Simeulue earthquake: magnitude 8.6
- 2007 Bengkulu earthquakes: Series of earthquakes, the three largest were magnitude 8.5, 7.9, and 7.0.
- 2008 Simeulue earthquake: magnitude 7.4 near the 2002 event.
- 2009 Sumatra earthquakes: magnitude 7.6
- 2010 Mentawai earthquake and tsunami: magnitude 7.8

=== Java segment ===
- 1917 Bali earthquake: magnitude 6.6
- 1994 Java earthquake: magnitude 7.8
- 2006 Pangandaran earthquake and tsunami: magnitude 7.7
- 2009 West Java earthquake: magnitude 7.0
- 2019 Sunda Strait earthquake: magnitude 6.9

== See also ==
- Banda Arc
- List of islands of Indonesia
- Plate tectonics
- Sunda Arc
- Sunda Islands
  - Greater Sunda Islands
  - Lesser Sunda Islands
- Sundaland
- Oceanic trench
