= 1861 Sumatra earthquake =

Natural disaster in Indonesia

- Location within Sumatra
- Local date: 16 February 1861
- Magnitude: 8.5 M_{w}
- Epicenter: 1.0°N 97.5°E
- Fault: Sunda megathrust
- Areas affected: Sumatra, Dutch East Indies
- Max. intensity: VIII (Heavily damaging)
- Tsunami: Yes
- Casualties: Several thousand

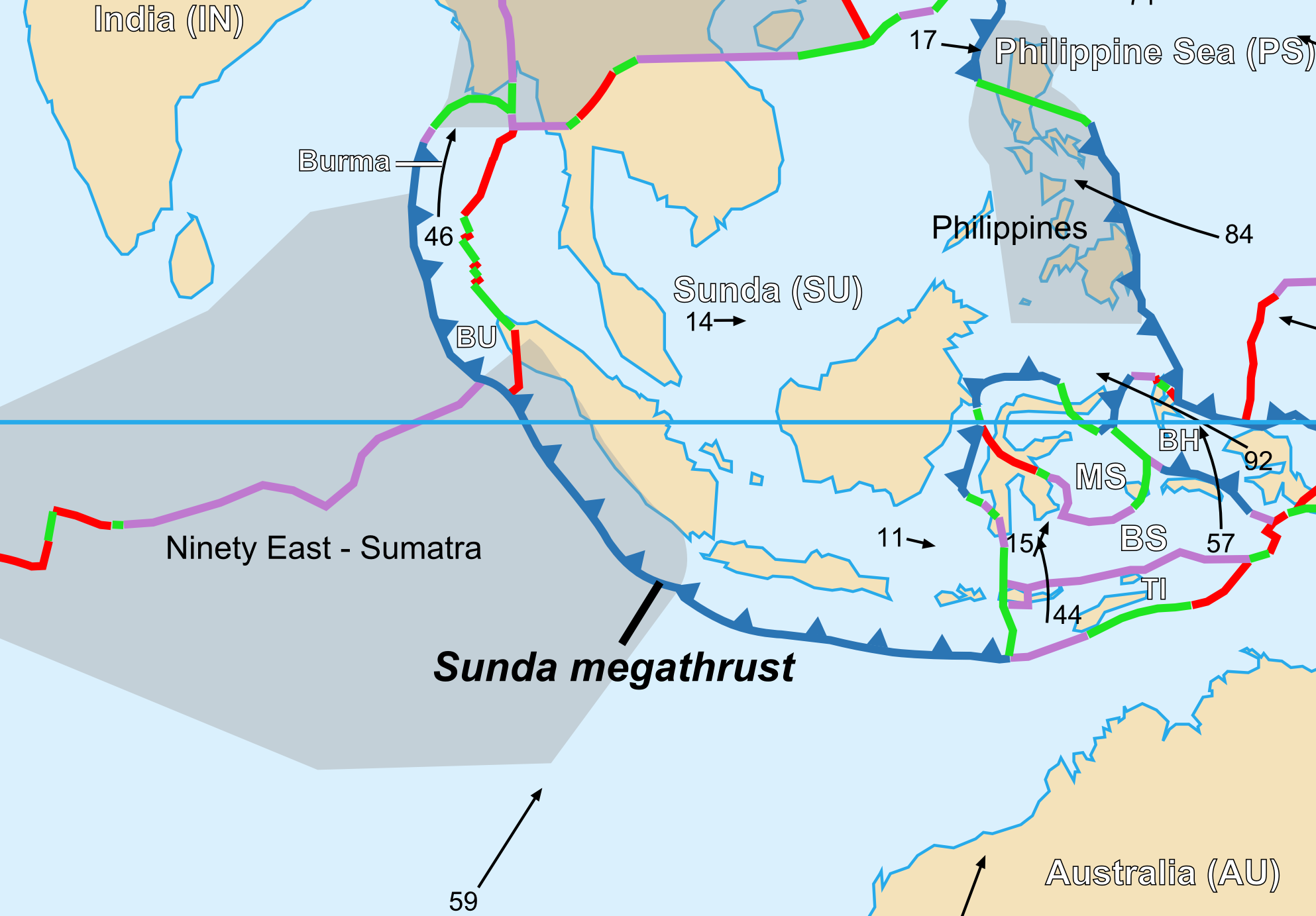
Tectonic setting of the Sunda megathrust

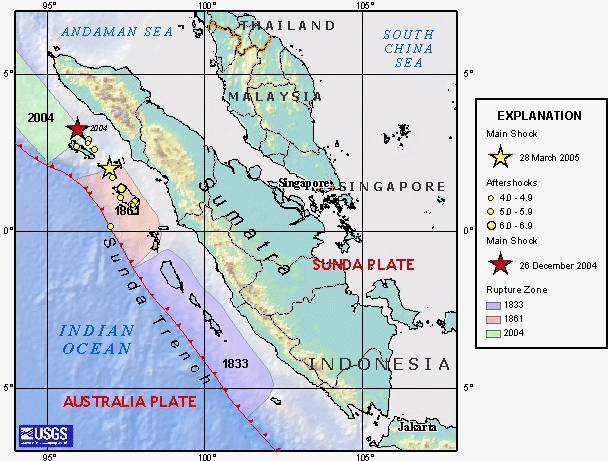
Rupture areas for the 1861, 1833 and 2004 earthquakes and area of main shock and aftershocks for the 2005 event, showing similarity to 1861 quake

The 1861 Sumatra earthquake occurred on 16 February and was the last in a sequences of earthquakes that ruptured adjacent parts of the Sumatran segment of the Sunda megathrust. It caused a devastating tsunami which led to several thousand fatalities. The earthquake was felt as far away as the Malay peninsula and the eastern part of Java. The rupture area for the 2005 Nias–Simeulue earthquake is similar to that estimated for the 1861 event.

== Background ==
The island of Sumatra lies on the convergent plate boundary between the Indo-Australian plate and the Eurasian plate. The convergence between these plates is highly oblique near Sumatra, with the displacement being accommodated by near pure dip-slip faulting along the subduction zone, known as the Sunda megathrust, and near pure strike-slip faulting along the Great Sumatran fault. The major slip events on the subduction zone interface are typically of megathrust type. Historically, great or giant megathrust earthquakes have been recorded in 1797, 1833, 1861, 2004, 2005 and 2007, most of them being associated with devastating tsunamis. Smaller (but still large) megathrust events have also occurred in the small gaps between the areas that slip during the larger events, in 1935, 1984, 2000 and 2002.

== Damage ==
Villages along the seaward side of the Batu Islands were devastated. The combined effects of the earthquake and tsunami caused several thousand fatalities.

== Characteristics ==
=== Earthquake ===
There is evidence of coseismic uplift of Nias, with exposure of reefs and rock piers. There were six major aftershocks over the next seven months, the last of which, on 27 September caused a damaging tsunami. Based on studies of coral growth patterns, researchers have demonstrated that the 1861 event was the culmination of a 32 year long "slow-slip" seismic event, rendering it the longest known example of such a sequence ever recorded.

=== Tsunami ===
At least 500 km (310.7 mi) of coastline were affected by the tsunami with run-ups of up to 7m (23 ft) recorded on the southwest side of Nias.

== See also ==
- 1843 Nias earthquake
- List of earthquakes in Indonesia
- List of historical earthquakes
- List of tsunamis
- Slow earthquake
