= 1984 Northern Sumatra earthquake =

Earthquake in Indonesia

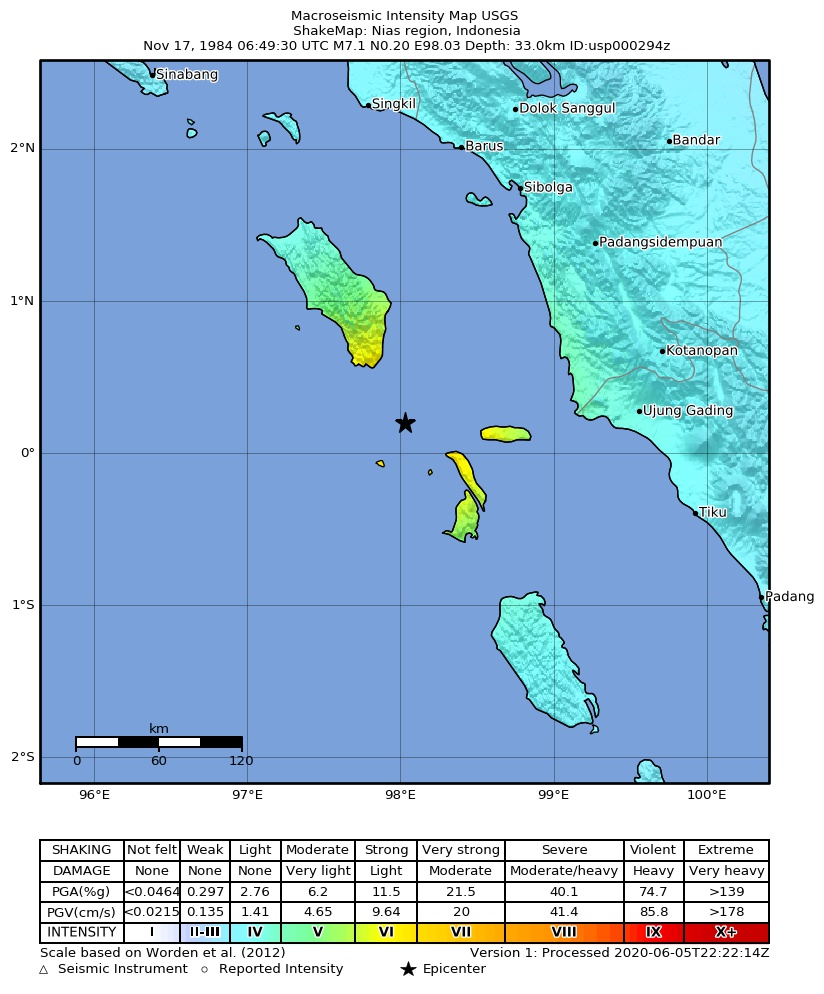
- USGS ShakeMap

- Location within Sumatra
- UTC time: 1984-11-17 06:49:30
- ISC event: 539292
- USGS-ANSS: ComCat
- Local date: 17 November 1984
- Local time: 13:49
- Magnitude: 7.2 M_{w}
- Depth: 33 kilometres (21 mi)
- Epicenter: 0.20°N 98.03°E
- Fault: Sunda megathrust
- Type: Megathrust
- Areas affected: Indonesia
- Max. intensity: MMI VII (Very strong)
- Casualties: 1 injured

The 1984 Northern Sumatra earthquake occurred with a moment magnitude of 7.2 on November 17 at 06:49 UTC. The epicentre was located off the coast of Sumatra, near the island of Nias, where building damage was reported. This earthquake could be strongly felt in parts of Northern Sumatra, including Padang and Medan. The focal mechanism corresponded to reverse faulting.

== Tectonic setting ==
The island of Sumatra lies on the convergent plate boundary between the Indo-Australian plate and the Eurasian plate. The convergence between these plates is highly oblique near Sumatra, with the displacement being accommodated by near pure dip-slip faulting along the subduction zone, known as the Sunda megathrust, and near pure strike-slip faulting along the Great Sumatran fault. The major slip events on the subduction zone interface are typically of megathrust type. Historically, megathrust earthquakes have been recorded in 1797, 1833, 1861, 2004, 2005 and 2007, most of them being associated with devastating tsunamis. Smaller (but still large) megathrust events have also occurred in the small gaps between the areas that slip during the larger events, in 1935, 1984, 2000 and 2002. The deformation velocity in the offshore Sumatra fore-arc region is estimated to be 19 mm/yr along N45° near the equator, with compression being the dominant deformation. The 1984 earthquake occurred in the same gap as the 1935 event.

== Characteristics ==
The earthquake was caused by a rupture of the subduction interface. The focal depth was about 27 km and the fault plane dipped at 12°. This earthquake contained mainly a down-dip convergence but also a right-lateral displacement.

== See also ==
- List of earthquakes in Indonesia
