= 1797 Sumatra earthquake =

Earthquake in Indonesia

- Location within Sumatra
- Local date: 10 February 1797
- Local time: 22:00
- Duration: Seven minutes
- Magnitude: M_{w} 8.6–8.8
- Epicenter: 1.0°S 99.0°E
- Fault: Sunda megathrust
- Areas affected: Sumatra, Dutch East India Company
- Max. intensity: EMS-98 IX (Destructive)
- Tsunami: Yes
- Casualties: Numerous

The 1797 Sumatra earthquake occurred at 22:00 local time on 10 February. It was the first in a series of great earthquakes that ruptured part of the Sumatran segment of the Sunda megathrust. It caused a damaging tsunami that was particularly severe near Padang, where a 150–200 t (170–220 short tons) English ship was driven 1 km (0.62 mi) inland up the Arau River.

== Background ==
The island of Sumatra lies on the convergent plate boundary between the Indo-Australian plate and the Eurasian plate. The convergence between these plates is highly oblique near Sumatra, with the displacement being accommodated by near pure dip-slip faulting along the subduction zone, known as the Sunda megathrust, and near pure strike-slip faulting along the Great Sumatran fault. The major slip events on the subduction zone interface are typically of the megathrust type.

Historically, great or giant megathrust earthquakes have been recorded in 1797, 1833, 1861, 2004, 2005 and 2007, most of them being associated with devastating tsunamis. Smaller (but still large) megathrust events have also occurred in the small gaps between the areas that slip during these larger events, in 1935, 1984, 2000 and 2002.

== Damage ==
The earthquake caused the collapse or damage of many houses. The tsunami surge drove an English sailing ship of 150–200 t (170–220 short tons), moored in the Arau River, about 1 km (0.62 mi) inland, destroying several houses as it went. Smaller boats were driven up to 1.8 km (1.1 mi) upstream. In Air Manis, the whole town was flooded and the bodies of several people who had climbed trees to escape the surge were found the next day in the branches. Only two fatalities were reported from Padang itself but many more from Air Manis. The Batu Islands were also reported to be affected.

== Characteristics ==
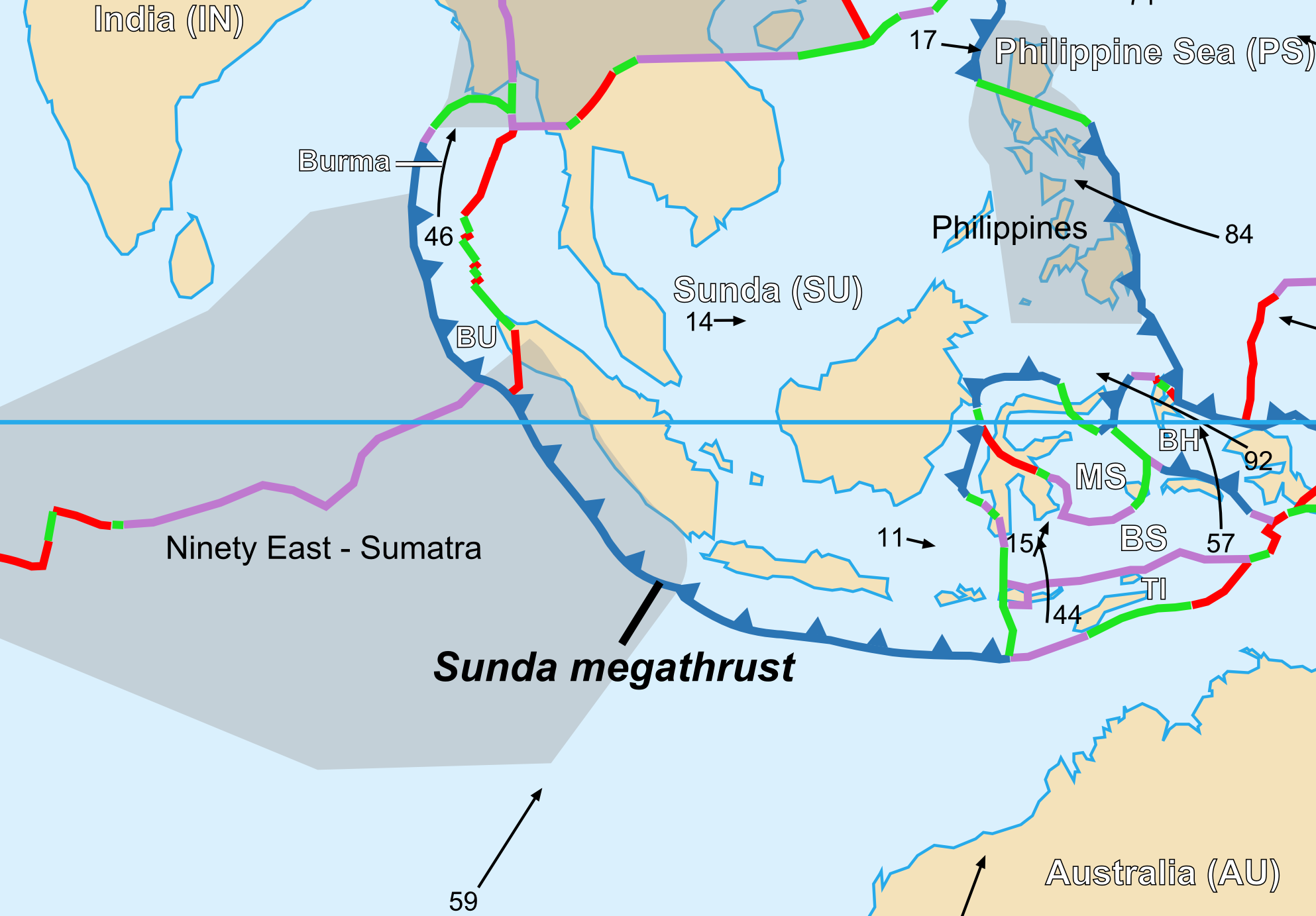
Tectonic setting of the Sunda megathrust

=== Earthquake ===
The shaking lasted up to seven minutes. The magnitude of the earthquake has been estimated from uplift patterns determined from eroded coral microatolls in the range M_{w} 8.6–8.8. Reports in 1845 and 1847 said either that this was the strongest earthquake in the memory of the residents of Padang or the strongest for forty years.

=== Tsunami ===
The run-up of the tsunami at Padang and the village of Air Manis is estimated to be in the range of 5–10 m (16–33 ft). Modelling of tsunami effects using source parameters estimated from the uplift of microatolls, provide a reasonable match to the sparse historical records.

The tsunami reports for this event are localised around Padang and it has been suggested that the tsunami may have been caused by an underwater landslide triggered by the earthquake.

== See also ==
- List of earthquakes in Indonesia
- List of historical earthquakes
- List of tsunamis
