= 1935 Sumatra earthquake =

Earthquake in Indonesia

- Location within Sumatra
- UTC time: 1935-12-28 02:35:31
- ISC event: 904721
- USGS-ANSS: ComCat
- Local date: December 28, 1935
- Local time: 09:35
- Magnitude: 7.7 M_{w}
- Epicenter: 0.0°N 98.25°E
- Fault: Sunda megathrust
- Areas affected: Sumatra, Dutch East Indies
- Max. intensity: EMS-98 VII (Damaging)
- Tsunami: Minor

The 1935 Sumatra earthquake occurred at 09:35 local time on 28 December. It had a magnitude of M_{w} 7.7 and a maximum felt intensity of VII (Damaging) on the European macroseismic scale. It also triggered a minor tsunami.

== Tectonic setting ==
The island of Sumatra lies on the convergent plate boundary between the Indo-Australian plate and the Eurasian plate. The convergence between these plates is highly oblique near Sumatra, with the displacement being accommodated by near pure dip-slip faulting along the subduction zone, known as the Sunda megathrust, and near pure strike-slip faulting along the Great Sumatran fault. The major slip events on the subduction zone interface are typically of megathrust type. Historically, great or giant megathrust earthquakes have been recorded in 1797, 1833, 1861, 2004, 2005 and 2007, most of them being associated with devastating tsunamis. Smaller (but still large) megathrust events have also occurred in the small gaps between the areas that slip during the larger events in 1935, 1984, 2000 and 2002.

== Damage ==
The Batu Islands and the neighbouring coast of Sumatra were the most affected areas. The lighthouse on Bodjo island was damaged and cracks appeared in the hill that it stands on. Several houses were destroyed at Pulu Tello. The islands of Tanahbala and Sigata showed evidence of uplift, with low-lying areas no longer flooded at high tide. Near Padang power and telephone lines swayed, with some lines being cut. Some huts collapsed at Sibolga, although there were no reported casualties.

== Characteristics ==
The earthquake is thought to have occurred on the plate interface at a depth of about 28 km. The estimated source parameters for the earthquake are 65 km length, 30 km width with a maximum displacement of 3 m. Such a rupture zone has a predicted pattern of uplift and subsidence and this has been found to be consistent with paleogeodetic records taken from coral microatolls around the Batu Islands.

== See also ==
- List of earthquakes in 1935
- List of earthquakes in Indonesia
