= Sunda megathrust =

Geological feature

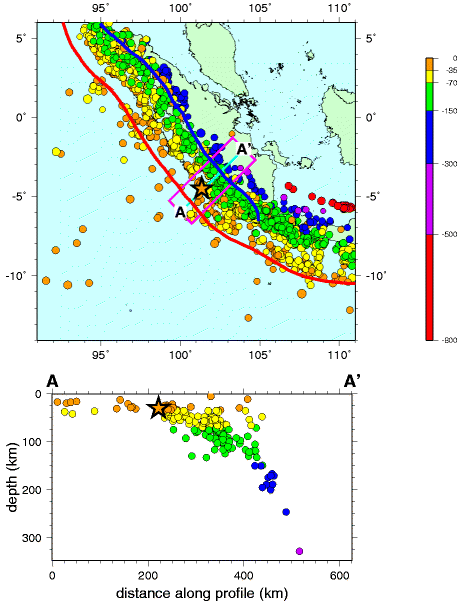
Variation of seismicity with depth across the Sunda Trench subduction zone, low-angle part is the Sunda megathrust – 2007 Bengkulu earthquakes mainshock shown by star

The Sunda megathrust is a fault that extends approximately 5,500 km (3,400 mi) from Myanmar (Burma) in the north, running along the southwestern side of Sumatra, to the south of Java and Bali before terminating near Australia. It is capable of producing 9.0+ magnitude earthquakes and tsunamis that could reach 30 m (100 ft) high. It is a megathrust, located at a convergent plate boundary where it forms the interface between the overriding Eurasian plate and the subducting Indo-Australian plate. It is one of the most seismogenic structures on Earth, being responsible for many great and giant earthquakes, including the 2004 Indian Ocean earthquake and tsunami that killed over 227,000 people. The Sunda megathrust can be divided into the Andaman Megathrust, Sumatra(n) Megathrust and Java(n) Megathrust. The Bali-Sumbawa segment is much less active and therefore does not have the "megathrust" term associated with it.

== Tectonic setting ==
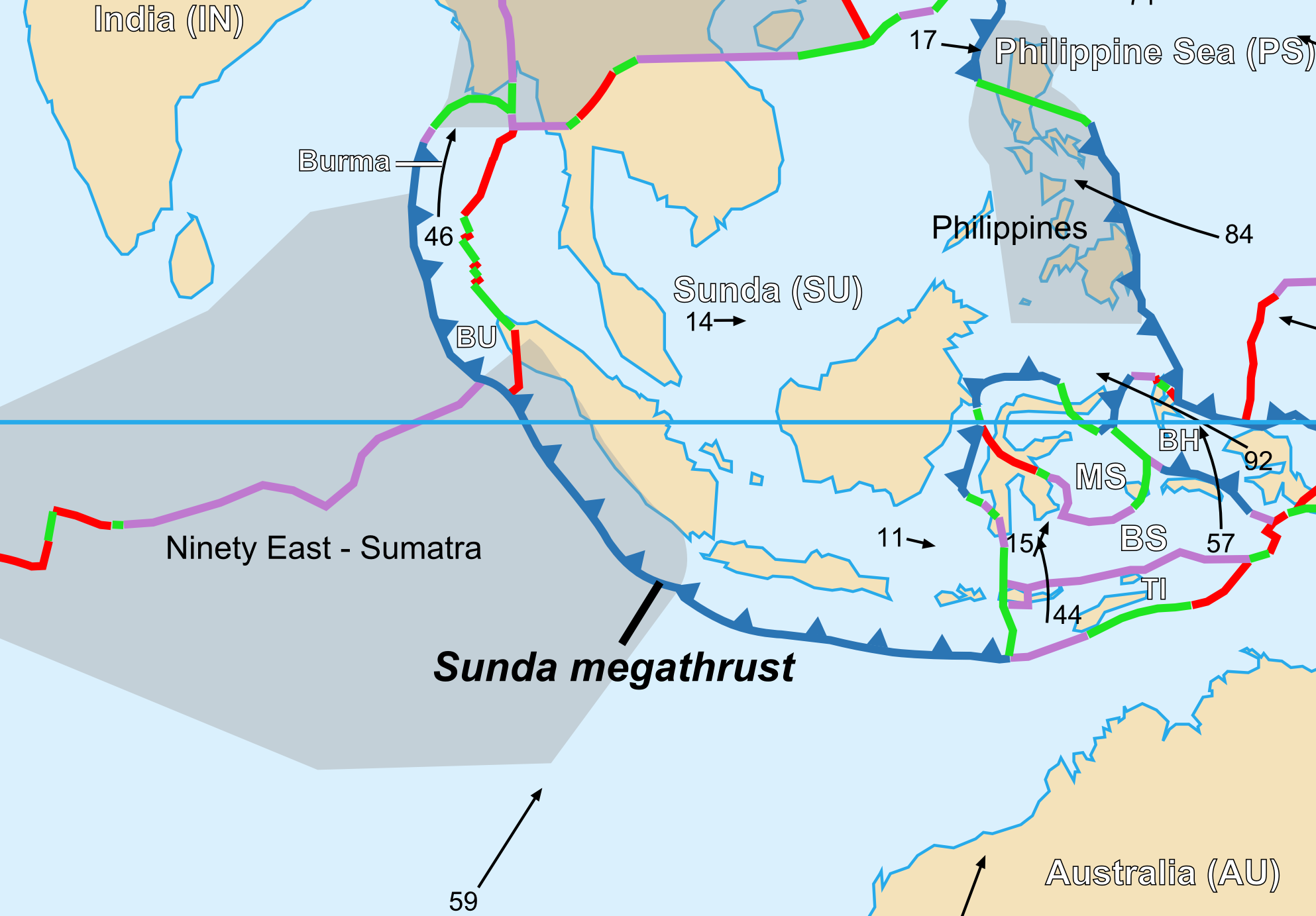
Plate tectonic setting of Sunda megathrust

The subducting plate consists of two protoplates, the Indian plate and Australian plate. Similarly, the overriding plate consists of two microplates, the Sunda and Burma plates. The relative motion of the subducting and overriding plates varies slightly along strike due to these complexities but is always strongly oblique. The strike-slip component of the oblique convergence is accommodated by displacement on the Great Sumatran fault, while the dip-slip component is taken up by the Sunda megathrust.

== Megathrust geometry ==
The Sunda megathrust is curviplanar, forming an arc in map view and, at least in Sumatra, increasing in dip from 5°–7° near the trench, then increasing gradually from 15°–20° beneath the Mentawai Islands to about 30° below the coastline of Sumatra.

== Earthquakes ==
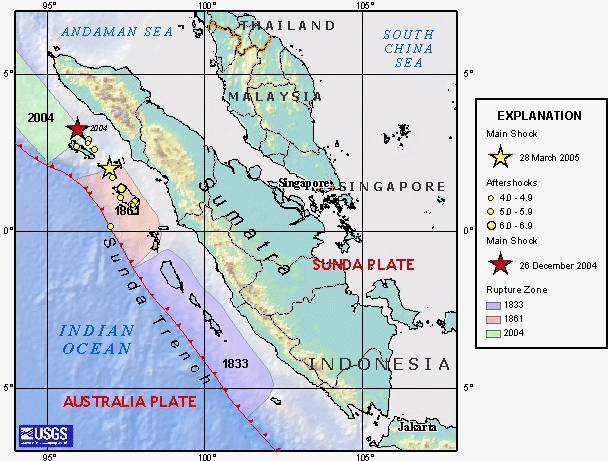
Rupture areas for the 1861, 1833 and 2004 earthquakes and area of main shock and aftershocks for the 2005 event, showing similarity to 1861 quake

At this plate boundary, earthquakes occur along the Sunda megathrust and within both the subducting and overriding plates. The largest earthquakes are generated when the megathrust itself ruptures. Studies of both recent and historical earthquakes show that the megathrust is segmented. The largest earthquakes occur on separate 'patches' along the megathrust surface (1797, 1833, 1861, 2004, 2005 & 2007), with smaller events occurring at the boundaries between these patches (1935, 1984, 2000 & 2002). The rupture area of the 1861 event appears to be very similar to that for the 2005 event, suggesting that it can be regarded as a repeat event. The 2007 event is interpreted to be a partial failure of the rupture area of the 1833 event.

The 2004 earthquake ruptured an enormous segment of the megathrust surface. Research into evidence for previous events of this size suggests that they are rare, with two candidate earlier events occurring soon after AD 1290–1400 and AD 780–990. The Java-Bali segment of the megathrust does not appear to be associated with great earthquakes, possibly due to mainly aseismic slip.

== List of Sunda megathrust earthquakes ==
This table lists Sunda Megathrust quakes with magnitudes of 7 or greater, or any known to have caused deaths. Historic records before 2004 are incomplete.

Date/Time	Location	Coordinates	Fatalities	Magnitude	Comments	Sources
1797-02-10	Just north of Siberut, Mentawai islands	1.0°S 99.0°E	300	8.4	See 1797 Sumatra earthquake	
1833-11-25	50 km NE of North Pagai, Mentawai islands	2.5°S 100.5°E	"numerous victims"	8.8–9.2 M_{w}	See 1833 Sumatra earthquake	
1843-10-05	Nias	1.5°N 98.0°E	"many killed"	≥7.8 M_{w}	Caused a devastating tsunami. Maximum intensity XI (Extreme). See 1843 Nias earthquake	
1861-02-16	Nias	1.0°N 97.5°E	905	8.5	Caused major tsunami. See 1861 Sumatra earthquake.	
1907-01-04 05:19	Just west of Simeulue	2.5°N 95.5°E	2,188	8.2–8.4	Tsunami earthquake that caused a tsunami that devastated Simeulue and Nias, see 1907 Sumatra earthquake	
1935-12-28 02:35	Just west of the Batu Islands	0.0°N 98.2°E		7.7	See 1935 Sumatra earthquake	
1984-11-17 06:49	Between Nias and the Batu Islands	0.20°N 98.03°E		7.2	See 1984 Northern Sumatra earthquake	
2000-06-04 16:28	70 km NNW of Enggano Island	4.72°S 102.09°E	103–141	7.9	See 2000 Sumatra earthquake	
2002-11-02 01:26	8 km north of Simeulue Regency	2.82°N 96.09°E	3	7.4	See 2002 Sumatra earthquake	
2004-12-26 00:58	50 km north of Simeulue Regency	3.30°N 95.87°E	227,898	9.2–9.3 M_{w}	See 2004 Indian Ocean earthquake	
2005-03-28 16:09	Bangkaru, Banyak Islands	2.08°N 97.11°E	1,303	8.6 M_{w} (HRV)	See 2005 Nias–Simeulue earthquake	
2007-09-12 11:10	125 km SW of Bengkulu	4.517°S 101.382°E	25	8.4 M_{w} (HRV)	See 2007 Bengkulu earthquakes	
2007-09-12 23:49:04 UTC	205 km NW of Bengkulu	2.506°S 100.906°E	-	7.9 M_{w} (USGS)	See 2007 Bengkulu earthquakes	
2007-09-13 03:35:26 UTC	165 km SSW of Padang	2.160°S 99.851°E	-	7.0 M_{w} (USGS)	See 2007 Bengkulu earthquakes	
2008-02-20 08:36:35 UTC	310 km SSE of Banda Aceh	2.778°N 95.978°E	3	7.4 M_{w} (USGS)	See 2008 Simeulue earthquake	
2008-02-25 08:36:35 UTC	160 km SSW of Padang	2.352°S 100.018°E		7.2 M_{w} (USGS)		
2009-09-30 10:16:10	45 km WNW of Padang	0.725°N 99.856°E	1,115	7.6 M_{w} (USGS)	See 2009 Sumatra earthquakes	
2010-04-06 22:15:02 UTC	215 km SW of Medan	2.360°N 97.132°E	62 injuries	7.8 M_{w} (USGS)	See 2010 Banyak Islands earthquake	
2010-05-09 05:59:42 UTC	215 km SSE of Banda Aceh	3.747°N 96.013°E	-	7.2 M_{w} (USGS)		
2010-10-25 14:42:22 UTC	240 km W of Bengkulu	3.464°S 100.084°E	435 & 100 missing	7.7 M_{w} (USGS)	See 2010 Mentawai earthquake and tsunami	
