= Indian Ocean earthquake =

Indian Ocean earthquake may refer to:

- 2000 Indian Ocean earthquake, magnitude 7.8
- 2004 Indian Ocean earthquake, estimated magnitude 9.1–9.3
- 2005 Indian Ocean earthquake, magnitude 8.6
- 2006 Indian Ocean earthquake, magnitude 7.7
- 2012 Indian Ocean earthquakes, magnitude 8.6 and 8.2
