= 2002 Sumatra earthquake =

2002 earthquake in Indonesia

- Location within Sumatra
- UTC time: 2002-11-02 01:26:10
- ISC event: 6121703
- USGS-ANSS: ComCat
- Local date: 2 November 2002
- Local time: 08:26:10 WIB (UTC+7)
- Magnitude: M_{w} 7.2–7.4; M_{L} 7.7
- Depth: 30 km (19 mi)
- Epicenter: 2.824°N 96.085°E
- Type: Thrust
- Areas affected: Simeulue, Indonesia
- Max. intensity: MMI VIII (Severe)
- Foreshocks: 2 mb
- Aftershocks: 28 ≥M_{w} 4.2 (as of 31/12/2002); Strongest: M_{w} 6.3 at 09:46 UTC on 2 November
- Casualties: 3 fatalities, 65 injuries

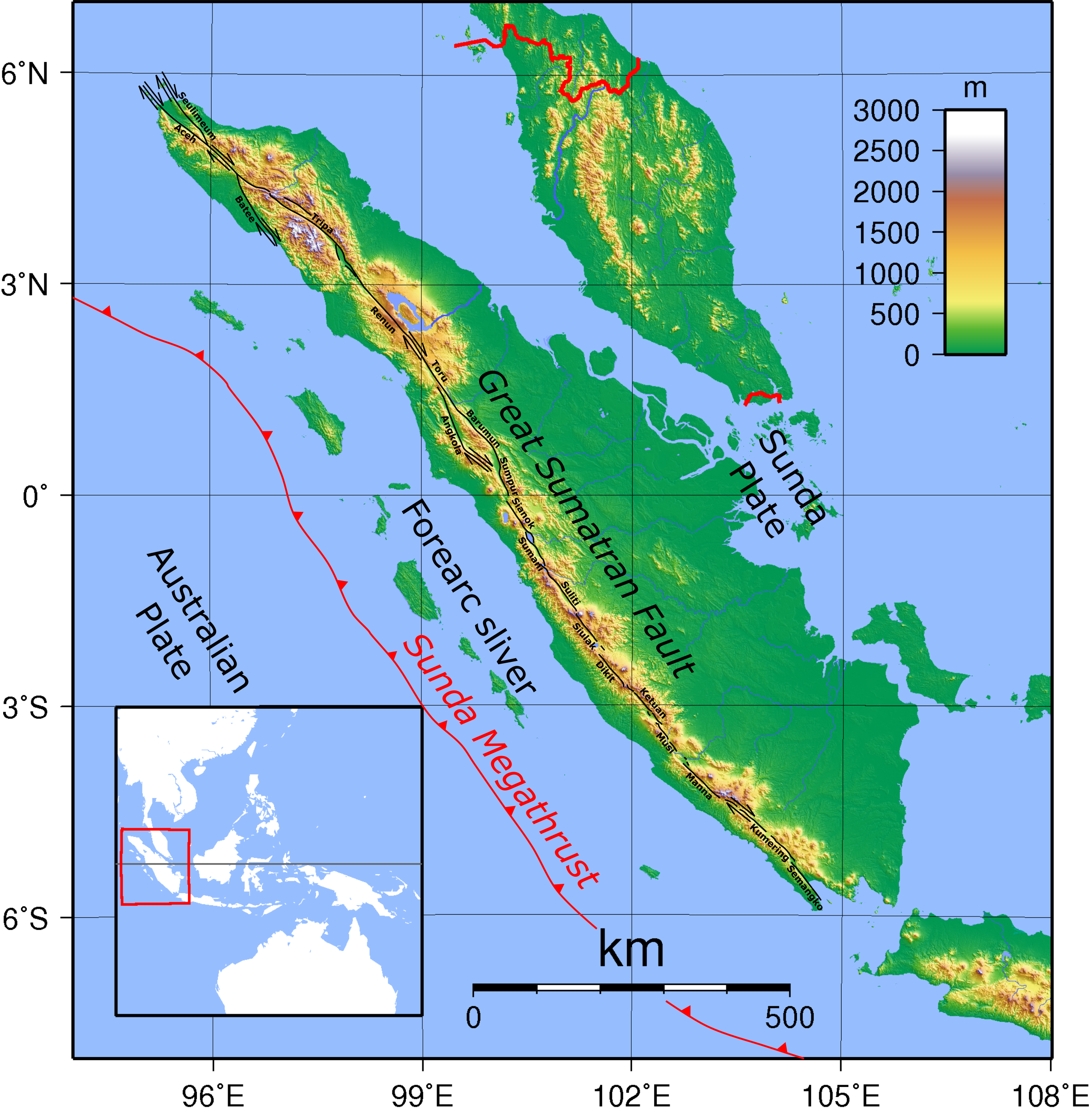

The 2002 Sumatra earthquake occurred at 08:26:10 WIB (01:26 UTC) on 2 November. It had a magnitude of M_{w} 7.2–7.4 with an epicenter just north of Simeulue island, and resulted in three fatalities. It is believed to be a foreshock of the 2004 Indian Ocean earthquake, which had an epicenter about 60 km to the northwest.

== Tectonic setting ==
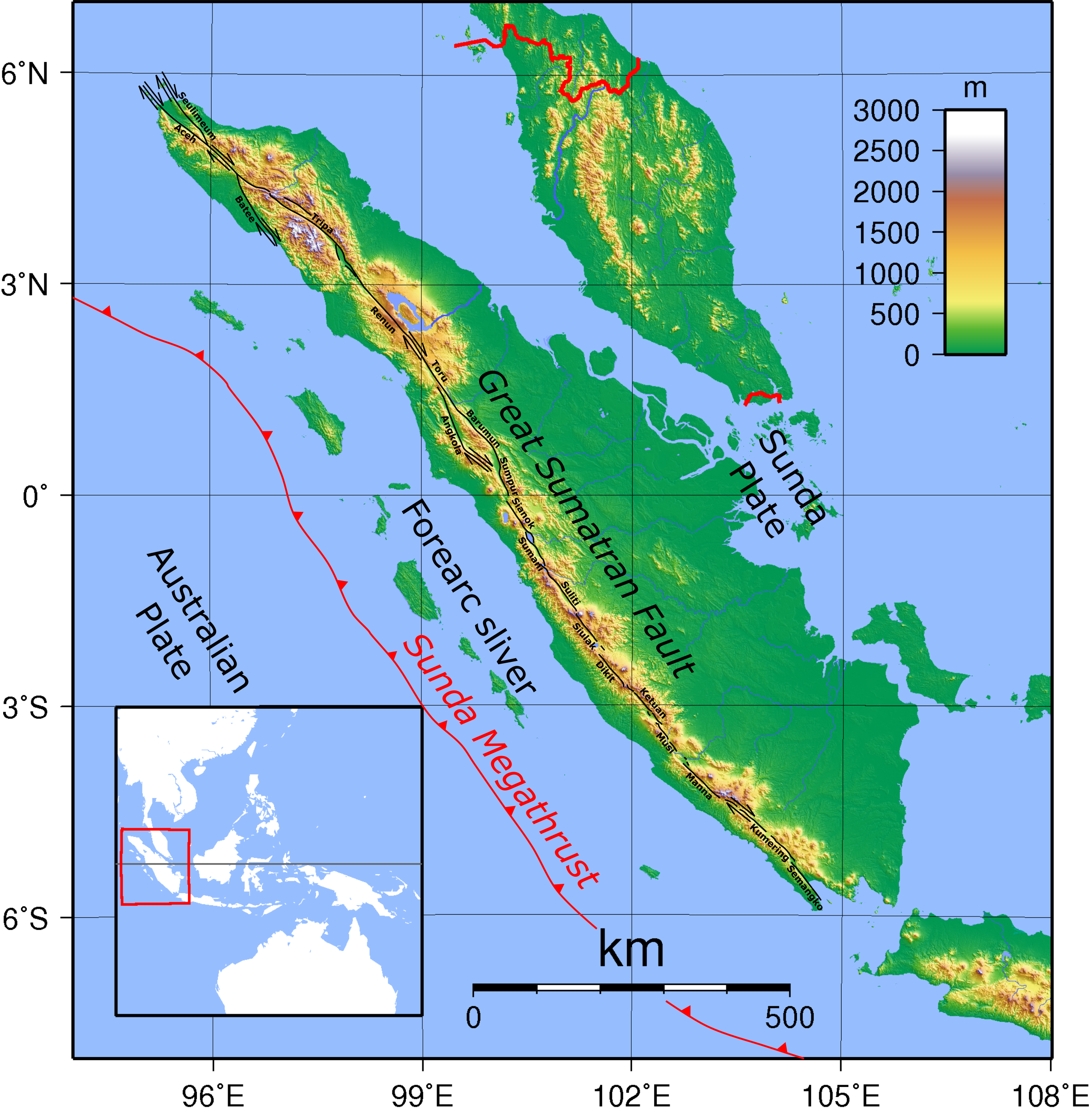
The Great Sumatran fault

The island of Sumatra lies on the convergent plate boundary between the Indo-Australian plate and the Eurasian plate. The convergence between these plates is highly oblique near Sumatra, with the displacement being accommodated by near pure dip-slip faulting along the subduction zone, known as the Sunda megathrust, and near pure strike-slip faulting along the Great Sumatran fault. The major slip events on the subduction zone interface are typically of megathrust type. Historically, great or giant megathrust earthquakes have been recorded in 1797, 1833, 1861, 2004, 2005 and 2007, most of them being associated with devastating tsunamis. Smaller (but still large) megathrust events have also occurred in the small gaps between the areas that slip during the larger events, in 1935, 1984, 2000 and 2002.

== Earthquake ==
The earthquake occurred as a result of shallow thrust faulting on the boundary between the subducting Australian Plate and the overriding Sunda Plate. The United States Geological Survey (USGS) reported a magnitude of M_{w} 7.5 before later revising it to 7.4. Geoscience Australia put the magnitude at M_{L} 7.7, while the International Seismological Centre and the National Centers for Environmental Information said that the earthquake had a magnitude of M_{w} 7.2 and M_{s} 7.6, respectively. It was preceded by two mb 4.7 foreshocks to the north on 18 and 31 October, respectively.

Its offshore epicenter was located 7 km (4.3 mi) north-northeast of Simeulue Regency, and 50 km (31 mi) northwest of the town of Sinabang. A rupture area of 65 km (40 mi) x 75 km (47 mi) was estimated, extending southwest to Simeulue, with a maximum slip of 1.123 m (3.68 ft) near the hypocenter; up to 0.982 m (3.22 ft) of slip was recorded at Simeulue. The observed source time function gives a 20 second duration for the earthquake, with the greatest phase of seismic moment release occurring almost 10 seconds after initiation. A maximum Modified Mercalli intensity (MMI) of VII-VIII (Very Strong-Severe) was estimated on Simeulue, VI (Strong) at Tapaktuan and V (Moderate) at Meulaboh and Singkil in Aceh Province. Following the mainshock, there were 28 aftershocks exceeding M_{w} 4.2 by the end of 2002, including a M_{w} 6.3 event at 09:46 UTC on 2 November, which had a maximum MMI of VII.

The rupture area of the 2002 earthquake lies at the boundary between the rupture areas of the 2004 and 2005 earthquakes, as determined by the uplift patterns of coral microatolls. From its proximity to the epicenter of the 2004 earthquake, it is regarded as a foreshock of that event. Microatolls around Simeulue show evidence of uplift as a result of the 2002 event, distinct from the uplift caused by the 2004 event. Waveforms from this earthquake have been used to model the propagation of Rayleigh waves during the 2004 earthquake, using an empirical Green's function analysis.

== Damage and casualties ==
The earthquake killed three people, injured 65 others and damaged 994 homes, dozens of shops, four government buildings and several roads, with all damage and casualties occurring on Simeulue Island, near the epicenter; the lack of roads on the island left many villages inaccessible. Dozens of homes and shops were completely destroyed. Two of the injured were in critical condition.

== See also ==
- List of earthquakes in 2002
- List of earthquakes in Indonesia
