= 1833 Sumatra earthquake =

Seismic event

- Location within Sumatra
- Local date: November 25, 1833
- Local time: 22:00
- Magnitude: 8.8–9.2 M_{w}
- Epicenter: 2.5°S 100.5°E
- Fault: Sunda megathrust
- Areas affected: Sumatra, Dutch East Indies
- Max. intensity: VIII (Heavily damaging)
- Tsunami: Yes
- Casualties: Unknown

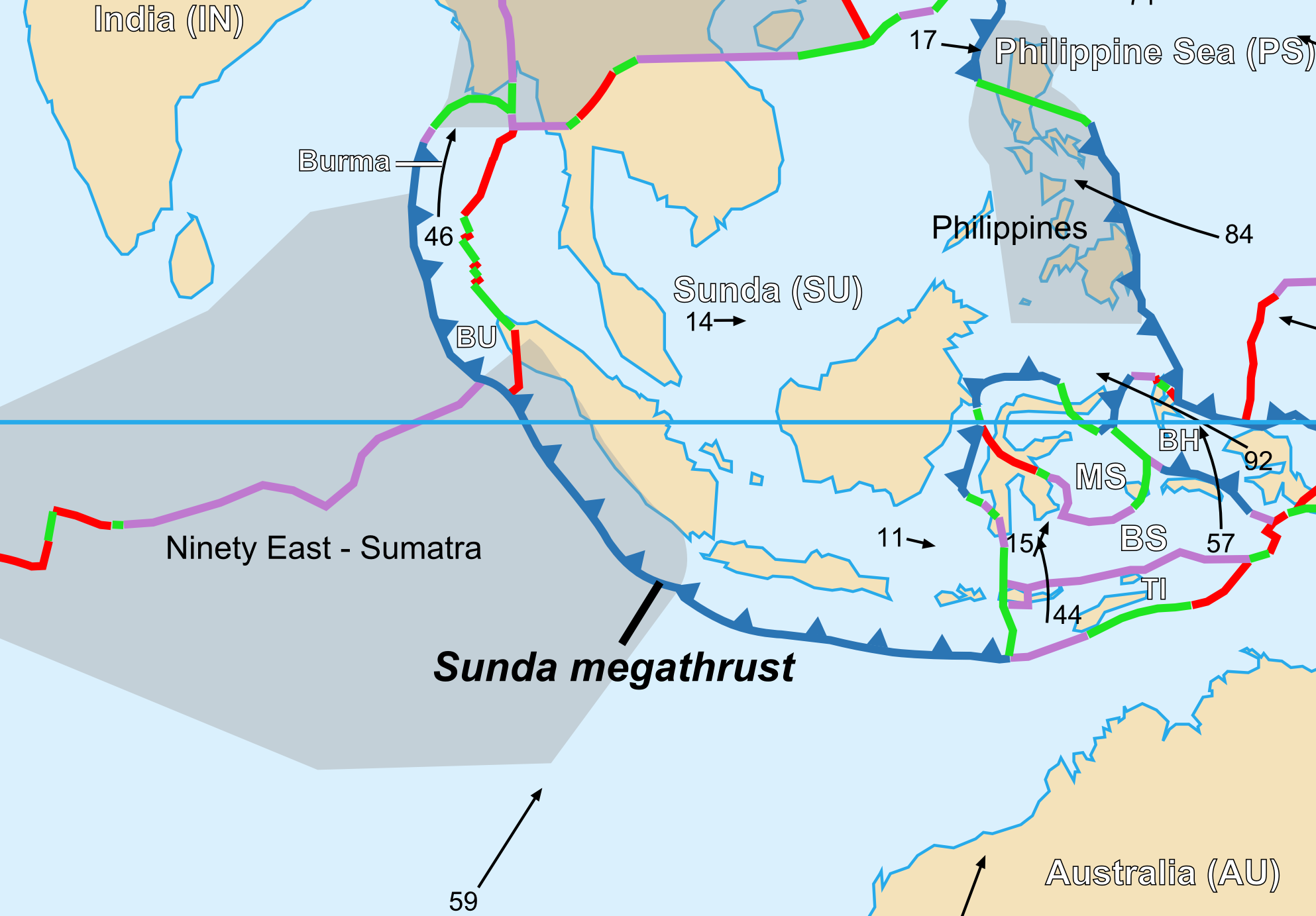
Tectonic setting of the Sunda megathrust

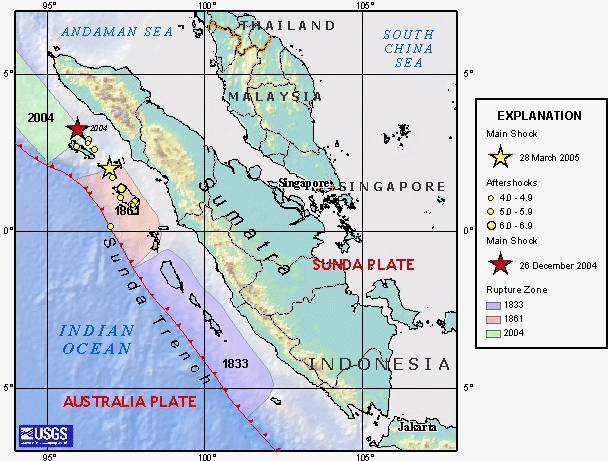
USGS map showing rupture area of the 1833 quake

The 1833 Sumatra earthquake occurred on November 25 at about 22:00 local time, with an estimated magnitude in the range of 8.8–9.2 M_{w}. It caused a large tsunami that flooded the southwestern coast of the island. There are no reliable records of the loss of life, with the casualties being described only as 'numerous'. The magnitude of this event has been estimated using records of uplift taken from coral microatolls.

== Background ==
The island of Sumatra lies on the convergent plate boundary between the Indo-Australian plate and the Eurasian plate. The convergence between these plates is highly oblique near Sumatra, with the displacement being accommodated by near pure dip-slip faulting along the subduction zone, known as the Sunda megathrust, and near pure strike-slip faulting along the Great Sumatran fault. The major slip events on the subduction zone interface are typically of megathrust type. Historically, great or giant megathrust earthquakes have been recorded in 1797, 1833, 1861, 2004, 2005 and 2007, most of them being associated with devastating tsunamis. Smaller (but still large) megathrust events have also occurred in the small gaps between the areas that slip during the larger events, in 1935, 1984, 2000 and 2002.

== Damage ==
There is only sparse information available regarding the extent of damage associated with either the earthquake or the subsequent tsunami. However, the tsunami was clearly devastating along the southwest coast of Sumatra from Pariaman to Bengkulu. There is also a lone report of significant damage in the Seychelles. The tsunami also caused severe damage in the Maldives and Sri Lanka. Waves have also been reported to reach northern Australia, the Bay of Bengal and Thailand, although in small intensity.

== Characteristics ==
=== Earthquake ===
The earthquake shaking lasted 5 minutes in Bengkulu and 3 minutes in Padang, combined with the severity this suggests a very large source rupture. The rupture extent and the magnitude of this earthquake has been determined using the effect of relative sea level changes on coral microatolls from a group of small islands along the outer arc ridge that runs parallel the coast of Sumatra, the Mentawai islands. These microatolls, named for their resemblance to island atolls, can be used to provide a record of sea level change. Microatolls form because the coral head cannot grow up beyond low tide level (known as highest level of survival or HLS) as exposure leads to death. The morphology of the microatolls directly reflects changes in HLS. The presence of annual growth banding combined with the Uranium-thorium dating method allows morphological changes to be dated, with an uncertainty of only a few years to a few decades.

=== Tsunami ===
Modelling of the tsunami suggests that most of the energy would have been radiated out into the Indian Ocean, sparing most coastal population centres outside Sumatra itself. Detailed modelling around Sumatra matches well with limited observations available.

== See also ==
- List of earthquakes in Indonesia
- List of historical earthquakes
