= 2005 Nias–Simeulue earthquake =

2005 earthquake in Sumatra, Indonesia

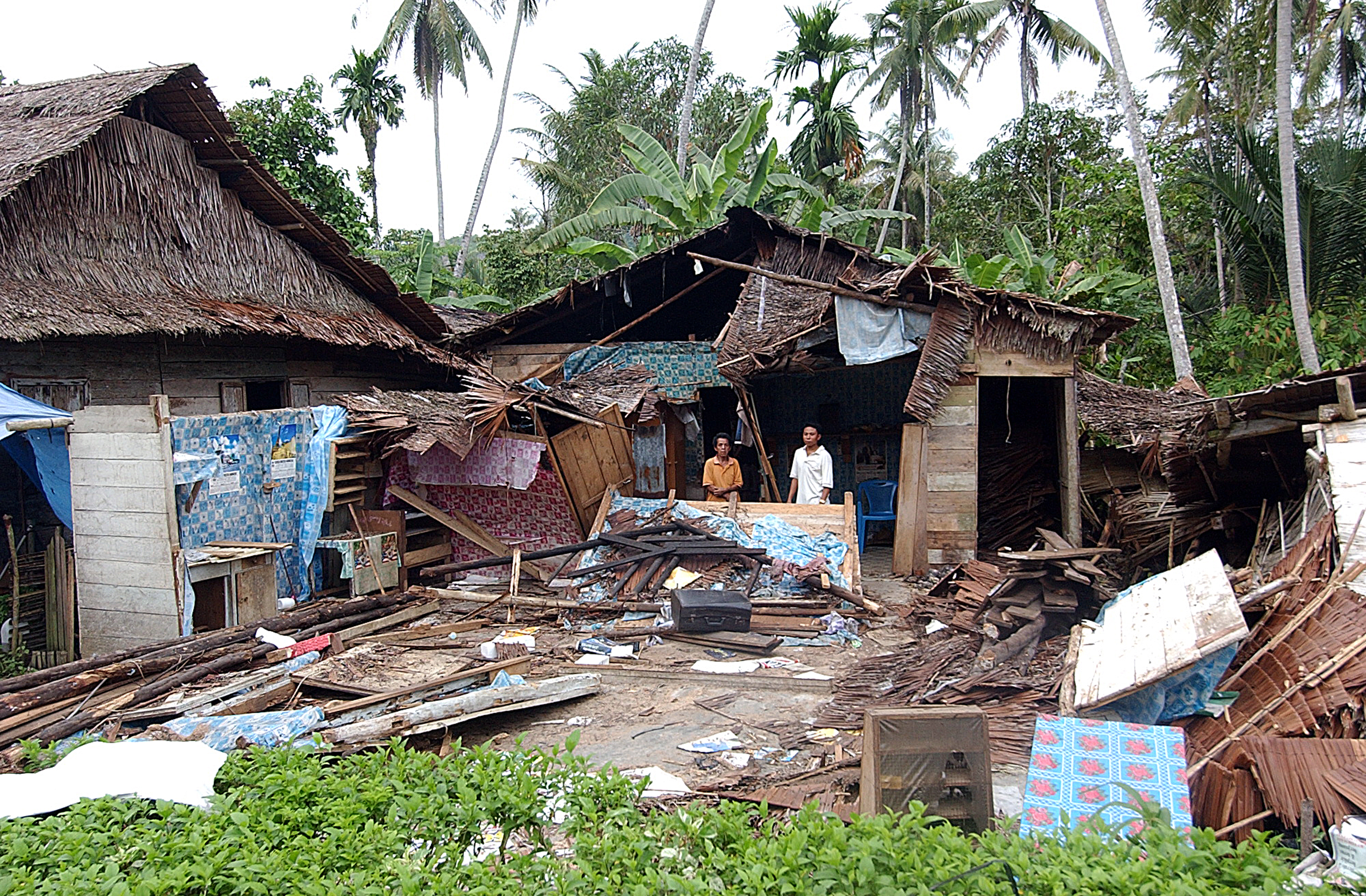
- Severely damaged houses in Nias

- Location within Sumatra Location within North Sumatra
- UTC time: 2005-03-28 16:09:37
- ISC event: 7486110
- USGS-ANSS: ComCat
- Local date: 28 March 2005
- Local time: 23:09:37 WIB (UTC+7)
- Duration: 2 minutes
- Magnitude: M_{w} 8.6–8.7
- Depth: 30.0 km (18.6 mi)
- Epicenter: 2.09°N 97.15°E
- Fault: Sunda megathrust
- Type: Megathrust
- Areas affected: Aceh and North Sumatra, Indonesia
- Total damage: US$392 million (equivalent to $646.2 million in 2025)
- Max. intensity: MMI X (Extreme)
- Tsunami: 4.2 m (14 ft)
- Landslides: Yes
- Aftershocks: 1,587 (as of 31 December 2005); M_{w} 6.9 on 19 May 2005 (Strongest)
- Casualties: 1,638–1,738 dead, 9,375 injured

On 28 March 2005, at 23:09:37 WIB, a M_{w} 8.6–8.7 earthquake struck the Banyak Islands, located off the coast of Aceh, Indonesia. It was the most powerful earthquake globally since the 2004 Indian Ocean earthquake three months prior, and is tied with the 2012 Indian Ocean, 1957 Andreanof Islands, 1950 Assam–Tibet and 1946 Aleutian Islands earthquakes as the tenth-largest earthquake ever recorded by seismometers.

The earthquake killed at least 1,600 people and injured over 9,300 others. Of the fatalities, 1,300 occurred on the island of Nias, with at least 200 additional deaths in the Banyak Islands and 100 more in Simeulue. These islands were devastated, with the majority of homes damaged or destroyed and entire villages razed. An additional 22 people were killed in mainland Sumatra. A tsunami was also generated, although it only reached up to 4.2 m (14 ft) high and caused moderate damage in the epicentral area.

== Tectonic setting ==
The island of Sumatra lies on the convergent plate boundary between the Indo-Australian plate and the Eurasian plate. The convergence between these plates is highly oblique near Sumatra, with the displacement being accommodated by near pure dip-slip faulting along the subduction zone, known as the Sunda megathrust, and near pure strike-slip faulting along the Great Sumatran fault. The major slip events on the subduction zone interface are typically of megathrust type. Historically, great or giant megathrust earthquakes have been recorded in 1797, 1833, 1861, 2004, 2005 and 2007, most of them being associated with devastating tsunamis. Smaller (but still large) megathrust events have also occurred in the small gaps between the areas that slip during the larger events, in 1935, 1984, 2000, 2002 and 2004.

== Earthquake ==
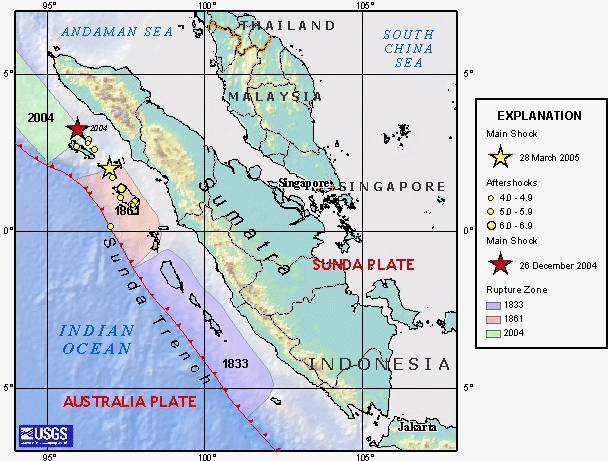
Sunda Trench rupture zones for the 1833, 1861, and 2004 events

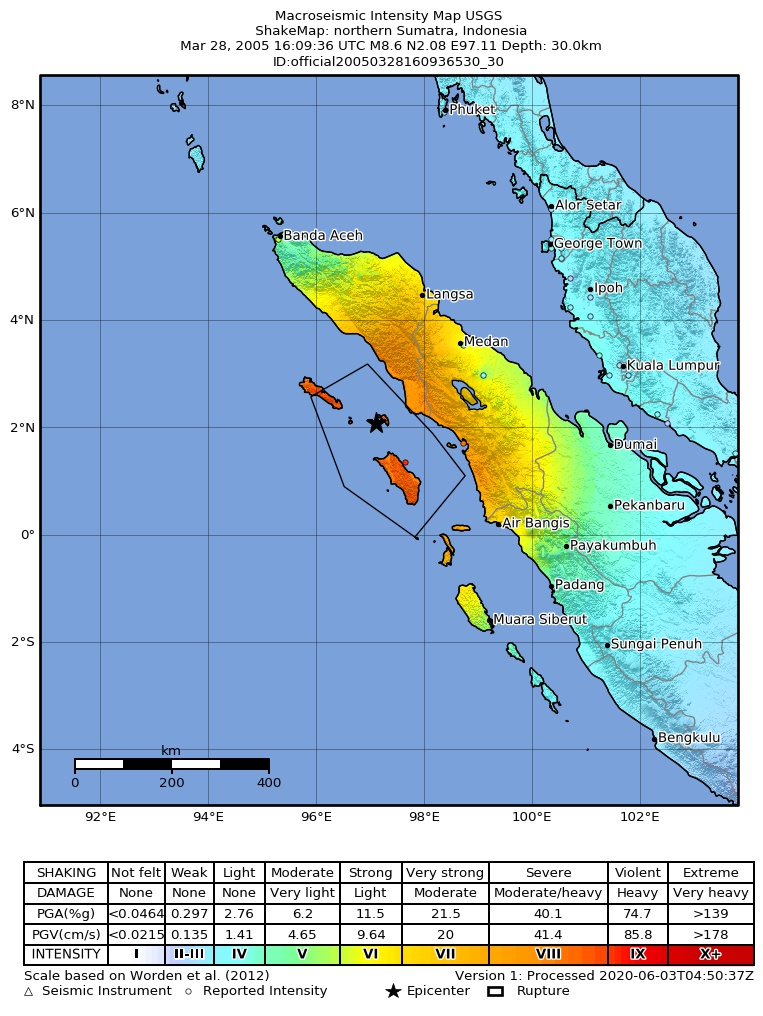
USGS ShakeMap

Estimated number of people exposed to shaking levels
MMI	Population exposure
MMI IX (Violent)	18k
MMI VIII (Severe)	861k
MMI VII (Very strong)	1,724k
MMI VI (Strong)	4,121k

The earthquake occurred at 16:09:37 UTC (23:09:37 WIB) on 28 March. The United States Geological Survey and International Seismological Centre reported a moment magnitude of M_{w} 8.6, while some independent studies put the magnitude at M_{w} 8.7. Its epicenter was located on the island of Bangkaru, part of the Banyak Islands. It struck 30 kilometres (19 mi) below the surface.

The focal mechanism is consistent with megathrust faulting along a section of the Sunda megathrust. A rupture area of 420 km (260 mi) x 250 km (160 mi) was estimated, extending from Simeulue and Southwest Aceh Regency in the north, to the Batu Islands in the south, with a maximum slip of 9.248 m (30.34 ft) east of Simeulue. The observed source time function gives a 120-second duration for the earthquake, with the greatest phase of seismic moment release occurring about 40 seconds after initiation. Based on surface deformation, it was interpreted that up to 11 m (36 ft) of slip in layered elastic spaces under Sumatra. Because of the elastic environment, the converging oceanic and continental plates build energy and are then locked by friction. The continental plate is forced back, and then shortened, causing uplift. The converging plates exceed frictional forces (deformation), causing slip along the fault. After the March 28 earthquake, afterslips continued to occur for 11 months, exerting the energy equivalent to a single M_{w} 8.2 earthquake.

The earthquake uplifted the entire 110 km (68 mi) stretch of Nias's western coastline by 2 m (6.6 ft), expanding beaches and exposing coral reefs; up to 6 m (20 ft) of uplift was observed in the town of Lahewa on Nias's northwestern coast. It also caused Simeulue to rise by 2 m (6.6 ft) and the Banyak Islands to sink by 1 m (3.3 ft). Proof of uplift was recorded using cGPS stations, highest level of survival for coral, and coseismic slips. Before the 2005 earthquake, there were already three cGPS sites set up. Three more were set up after the earthquake. These were used to study movement caused by the earthquake, and the Sumatran GPS Array and station were able to record coseismic displacements.

Vertical displacements and substantial coseismic uplift on Nias and Simeulue ranged from 1 to 2.5 m (3.3–8.2 ft). These measurements were derived from continuous GPS stations, with one on Nias recording 2.9 m (9.5 ft) of slip, supplemented by coral micro-atoll data indicating peak uplifts up to 2.8 m (9.2 ft) in coastal areas. Satellite altimetry from Jason-1 also contributed to mapping offshore vertical deformation patterns consistent with this range, validating the tectonic response over the ruptured megathrust segment. Modeling of the fault slip distribution, based on joint inversions of seismic waveforms, GPS, and InSAR data, revealed two primary asperities; a larger patch beneath Nias with maximum slip of 11 m (36 ft) at depths of 15–25 km (9.3–15.5 mi), and a smaller patch under Simeulue with peak slip of around 7–8 m (23–26 ft). The rupture propagated bilaterally from the hypocenter near the Banyak Islands, with overall slip decreasing toward the Sunda megathrust due to the inhibiting effect of accretionary prism sediments. This distribution accounted for the observed surface deformation, with the high-slip zones directly correlating to the elevated coastal uplifts.

In the twenty-four hours immediately after the event, there were eight major aftershocks, measuring between M_{w} 5.5 and 6.0. By the end of 2005, there were 1,587 aftershocks exceeding M_{w} 4.0, including 140 events measuring M_{w} 5.0–5.9 and 13 exceeding M_{w} 6.0; the largest aftershock measured M_{w} 6.9, striking on 19 May 2005 with an epicenter close to that of the mainshock's.

Despite the epicenter's proximity to that of the 2004 Indian Ocean earthquake, it ruptured a separate segment of the Sunda megathrust and was most likely triggered by stress changes associated with that earlier event.

On Nias, the Modified Mercalli intensity was IX–X (Violent-Extreme) along the island's western coastline, VIII (Severe) in Gunungsitoli and VII (Very Strong) in Teluk Dalam. The USGS reported a maximum Modified Mercalli intensity (MMI) of IX (Violent) in Simeulue, the Banyak Islands and the town of Sibolga in North Sumatra. MMI VI (Strong) shaking was recorded in Banda Aceh, while Medan, Padang and Palembang recorded an intensity of MMI V (Moderate). MMI IV (Light) shaking was felt in Bangkok, Thailand and the west coast of Malaysia, while in Singapore and the Maldives, the MMI was III (Weak). Tremors were also felt in Sri Lanka and the Andaman and Nicobar Islands, India.

== Tsunami ==
Due to the earthquake's similar size to the 2004 Indian Ocean earthquake, many people feared a destructive ocean-wide tsunami similar to that of an event. Evacuations were carried out in coastal regions of Thailand, Malaysia, and Sri Lanka. The 2005 earthquake, however, produced a relatively small tsunami. A 3-metre (9.8 ft) tsunami caused moderate damage to the port and airport facilities on Simeulue, with a maximum runup of 4.2 m (14 ft) at the village of Busung, and a 4-metre (13 ft) high tsunami was recorded at Nias and a 3.5 m (11 ft) surge struck the Banyak Islands. Run-ups of 4 m (13 ft) were also reported in coastal areas of northwestern Sumatra, with 2.3 m (7.5 ft) high waves striking Singkil and a 1 m (3.3 ft) wave observed at Meulaboh. Much smaller waves, most detectable only in tide gauge recording systems, were recorded across the Indian Ocean; for example, a 25 cm (9.8 in) wave was recorded at Colombo, Sri Lanka, while a 40 cm (1.3 ft) high surge struck the island of Hanimaadhoo in the Maldives. Seiches were also observed on ponds in West Bengal, India.

Tsunami warnings were issued by the Pacific Tsunami Warning Center, operated by the US National Oceanic and Atmospheric Administration (NOAA), and by the government of Thailand. There were initial concerns that a major tsunami could be generated, particularly travelling south from the event's hypocenter.

Portions of Thailand's southern coast were evacuated as a precaution, and NOAA advised an evacuation of 965 kilometres (600 mi) of coastline in Sumatra. Evacuations occurred in the northern Malaysian states of Penang and Kedah, as well as the eastern coast of Sri Lanka, where ten people died while evacuating. Six people were also killed in traffic accidents associated with tsunami evacuations in Toamasina, Madagascar.

== Impact ==
The confirmed death toll on the island of Nias was 1,300, with initial estimates of up to 2,000 fatalities based on destruction seen across the island. More than 6,300 others were injured on the island. At least 300 buildings collapsed and up to 80% of homes were damaged or destroyed on the island, with 13,000 households destroyed and 60,000 others damaged. In addition, 12 ports and piers were damaged or destroyed, 400 bridges and 1,000 km (620 mi) of road were affected, 760 government buildings were damaged, 720 schools were destroyed, two hospitals and 350 health clinics were damaged, and 1,940 religious buildings were affected on Nias.

At least 296 people died in Gunungsitoli, Nias's largest town. About 30% of buildings in the town collapsed, including 70% of structures in the market district, 80% of structures were damaged across the town overall, hundreds of people were injured and its airstrip was damaged, preventing planes from landing, hampering aid. Nearly half of Gunungsitoli's population (27,000) were displaced by the earthquake. Across all of Nias, 200,000 islanders were displaced. Nias's main electric power generating plant, located in Gunungsitoli, experienced shaking that settled foundations under generators and overturned transformers. Ports, bridges, roads, community health clinics, and Nias's main hospital in Gunungsitoli were all destroyed. In the town of Lahewa, one of the closest towns in Nias to the epicenter, 31 fatalities and 146 destroyed homes were recorded.

At least 157 people were killed, 700 were seriously injured, thousands more were slightly injured, 3,000 homes collapsed and 4,500 others were severely damaged in the southern part of Nias. At least 100 people were killed in Teluk Dalam alone, with 12,000 others displaced in the area. In some villages of southern Nias, 35% of the population were injured by collapsing homes. In the village of Hilizulo'otano, three people were killed, 60 were injured, all 2,955 residents were displaced, and out of the 282 households, 150 collapsed and 130 were damaged. On 2 April, a M_{w} 4.6 aftershock caused several hundred injuries on Nias.

On Simeulue, 100 people were killed, 1,491 were injured, 50,000 were displaced and up to 80% of homes were affected. In Sinabang, 17 deaths and 200 serious injuries were recorded, and 60–80% of homes were damaged or destroyed by the earthquake and tsunami, with nearly half of the town's buildings collapsing. Some power lines connecting to Lasikin Airport were damaged, and part of a newly built jetty was submerged, and the terminal, staff residences, and storage building at the airport were destroyed.

The majority of the buildings that collapsed on Nias and Simeulue were self-built structures that were constructed without a permit, mainly shops and houses, and thus were not designed to withstand powerful earthquakes. Many bridges on Nias and Simeulue were also damaged due to subsidence and lateral spreading displacing their supports by 30–100 cm (0.98–3.28 ft). However, well-built, earthquake-resistant masonry structures survived without significant damage, while traditional timber houses were also largely undamaged. The earthquake inflicted direct economic damages estimated at US$392 million, with significant losses concentrated in housing, infrastructure, and productive sectors such as agriculture and fisheries.

On the Banyak Islands, directly at the epicenter of the earthquake, 200–300 people were killed, 80-90% of the population was displaced and many homes were destroyed after villages were inundated by seawater due to the tsunami and geographical effects from the earthquake, with some areas still flooded by 4 April.

In mainland Aceh, 15 deaths and 1,425 injuries were reported in the town of Singkil, where communications were severed and a road sank. Two people were killed and 117 were injured in South Aceh Regency and another person died in East Aceh Regency. In North Sumatra, three deaths and 40 injuries were reported in Meulaboh, while one person died and two others were seriously injured in Central Tapanuli Regency. Strong shaking caused power outages prompted thousands to flee their homes and seek higher ground in Banda Aceh.

== Humanitarian response ==
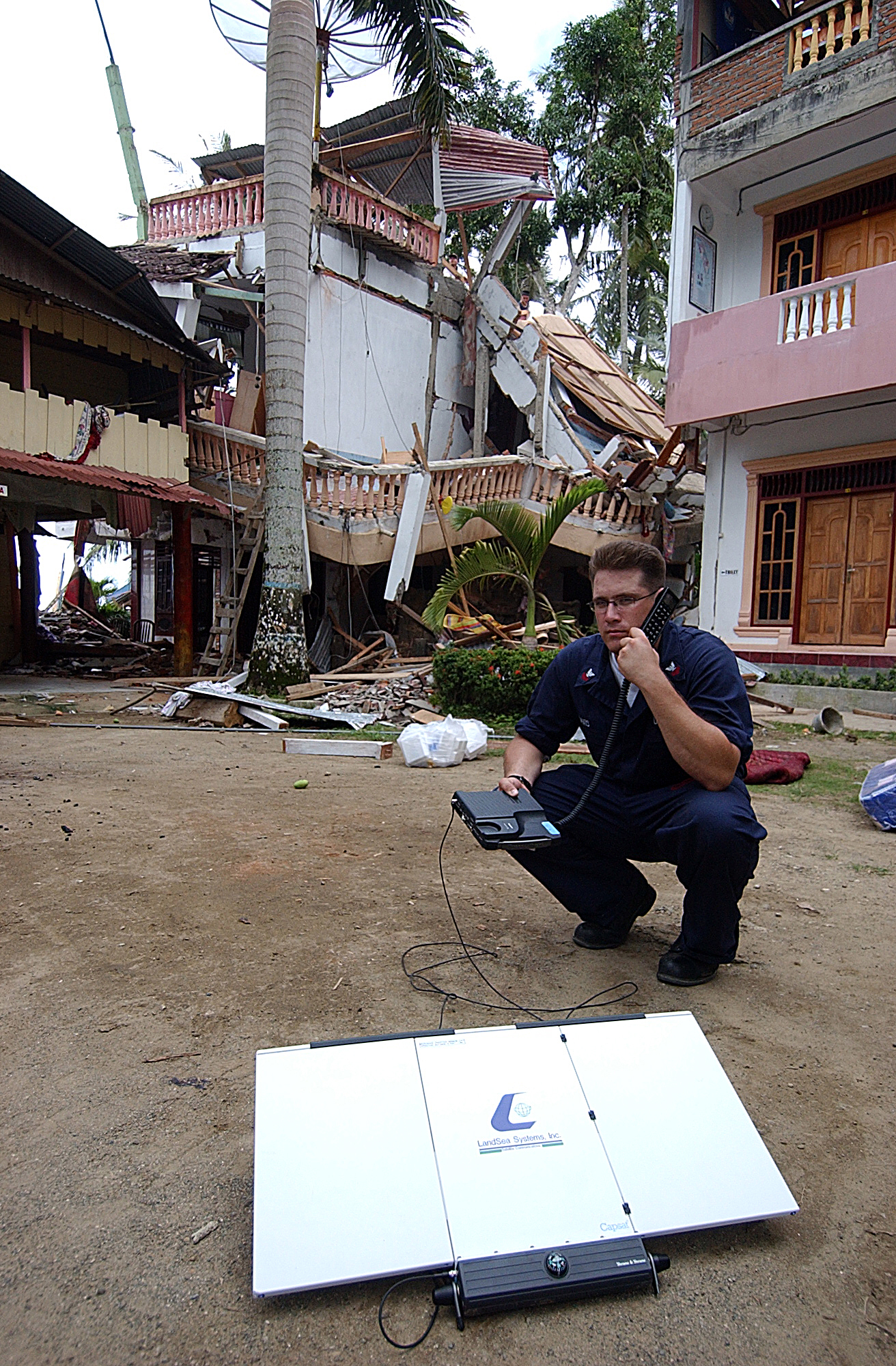
Communications check of a satellite phone connection established on the island of Nias for the relief efforts

The United Nations worked with the Indonesian government to take further actions to prevent a possible catastrophe after the strong earthquake. The United States Department of State announced that it will help countries affected by a possible tsunami. The government of India announced aid of US$2 million for victims.

Australia announced it would provide A$1 million in emergency aid and, at the request of the Indonesian Government, dispatched Australian Defence Force medical teams and equipment to Nias. As well as $60 million in humanitarian aid, and reconstruction loans up to $1 billion. The Australian naval ship HMAS Kanimbla, having only recently left Aceh, was redeployed to the region from Singapore. At about 09:30 (UTC) 2 April 2005, one of Kanimbla's two Sea King helicopters, Shark 02, crashed on the island of Nias while taking medical personnel to a village. Nine personnel were killed, and two others sustained injuries but were rescued from the site by the other helicopter. The crash occurred one day before a state visit by President Susilo Bambang Yudhoyono to Australia, where he and Prime Minister of Australia John Howard expressed mutual sorrow for their countries' losses. The US Navy responded to this earthquake by deploying the USNS Mercy, a 100-bed hospital ship, off the coast of Nias.

== Aftermath ==
After the earthquake, the International Organization for Migration focused on expanding road and bridge repair, putting forth plans to be enacted by 2006 that included construction of 75 temporary schools, homes, and child centers in Nias. Eleven bridges were repaired and 40 temporary homes constructed. Significant progress had been made by October 2005; plans for permanent schools were underway, 40% of damaged health centers were reconstructed, 25% of mosques and prayer halls were rebuilt, and 80% of fish markets had recovered.

== See also ==
- 2006 Yogyakarta earthquake
- 2009 Sumatra earthquakes
- 1843 Nias earthquake
- List of megathrust earthquakes
- List of earthquakes in 2005
- List of earthquakes in Indonesia
