= 1843 Nias earthquake =

1843 earthquake and tsunami in Indonesia

- Location within Sumatra
- Local date: January 5, 1843
- Local time: 23:30–24:00
- Magnitude: M_{w} 7.8+
- Epicenter: 1.5°N 98.0°E
- Fault: Sunda megathrust
- Areas affected: Sumatra, Dutch East Indies
- Max. intensity: MMI XI (Extreme)
- Tsunami: Yes
- Casualties: Many

The 1843 Nias earthquake off the northern coast of Sumatra, Indonesia caused severe damage when it triggered a tsunami along the coastline. The earthquake with a moment magnitude (M_{w}) of 7.8 lasted nine minutes, collapsing many homes in Sumatra and Nias. It was assigned a maximum modified Mercalli intensity of XI (Extreme).

== Tectonic setting ==
The west coast of Sumatra is dominated by the Sunda megathrust; a 5,000 km long convergent boundary where the Australian plate subducts beneath the Burma plate and Sunda plate at a rate of 60 mm/yr. Convergence along this plate boundary is highly oblique, severely deforming the overriding Sunda plate, where it is accommodated by the strike-slip motion along the Great Sumatran fault. Dip-slip fault can rupture within the downgoing Australian plate at deep depths as well; the 2009 magnitude 7.6 earthquake near Padang was caused by reverse faulting at a depth of 80 km. The subduction zone offshore Sumatra has been responsible for several large earthquakes in 2004 and 2005. Occasionally, the subduction ruptures in earthquake that reaches the trench, triggering large tsunamis such as in 1907, 2004 and 2010.

== Impact ==
The earthquake's destructive effects were felt on Nias and Sumatra islands. Shaking was described as weak and oscillating, but rapidly intensified. The extreme shaking was felt for up to nine minutes. It was so violent that standing or walking was impossible. Stone buildings and a fortress on a hill at Gunungsitoli on Nias Island were destroyed. Trees were uprooted and snapped. Cracks appeared in the ground and mud erupted from within. Liquefaction on Nias island caused some buildings to sink into the ground. Homes collapsed, killing many residents. Government offices and a Commandant's house were destroyed. Small landslides also occurred.

Shaking was also felt in Penang Island and Singapore. In Singapore, tremors were felt at half past midnight on January 6. Shaking was felt stronger on the hills, described as oscillating in an east–west direction. At Penang Island, shaking was felt in a north–south direction.

=== Aftershocks ===
Many aftershocks were felt until 04:30 local time. Earthquakes were felt every two minutes of each other. Another earthquake was felt on January 8 at 14:30.

=== Tsunami ===
The first tsunami waves were reported at 00:30 local time, causing extreme damage. It arrived from the southeast and struck the island. Cattle and human residents were swept away by the waves. At the villages of Barus (on Sumatra) and Palan Nias (on Nias Island), large waves were reported over a period of two days. A large tsunami reportedly destroyed settlements on the east coast of Nias and Sumatra islands. The tsunami wiped out a large village located two kilometers from Gunungsitoli. Proas located on a nearby river were washed inland by up to 50 meters. Many people were killed by the tsunami and earthquake. Ships at Barus were dumped 600 meters inland due to the tsunami.

The bodies tsunami victims were found along the shores in the days following. Kampong Mego, a large village on the island, was totally destroyed. The waves also smashed prows at the coast in the village of Goenong Sie Foli, north of Mego. The tsunami persisted until 04:30.

A sea disturbance was observed in the Malacca Strait at the time of the earthquake, however, that was attributed to the weather.

== Characteristic ==
A research article published in 2006 by the journal Science of Tsunami Hazards estimated the moment magnitude (M_{w}) at 7.2. In the book A catalogue of tsunamis on the western shore of the Pacific Ocean, the surface-wave magnitude was assigned 7.3. In 2013, the journal Geophysical Research Letters published a finding that re-estimated the moment magnitude to at least M_{w} 7.8 based on information of the extent of tsunami inundation.

It is unclear where the source of the earthquake originated, but may have occurred on the interface of the Sunda megathrust or a shallow splay fault within the accretionary wedge of the overriding plate.

The events of 1843 is the earliest record of an earthquake on Nias Island. Subsequent earthquakes in 1861 and 1907 would also occur on the island. It resulted in some uplift and subsidence on the northwestern section of Nias Island as investigated by scientists using microatolls. The island was raised by 17 centimeters during the quake. Uplift of the island also occurred during the large earthquakes of 1861, 2005 and 2010.

== See also ==
- List of earthquakes in Indonesia
- List of historical earthquakes
