= Capricorn plate =

Proposed minor tectonic plate under the Indian Ocean

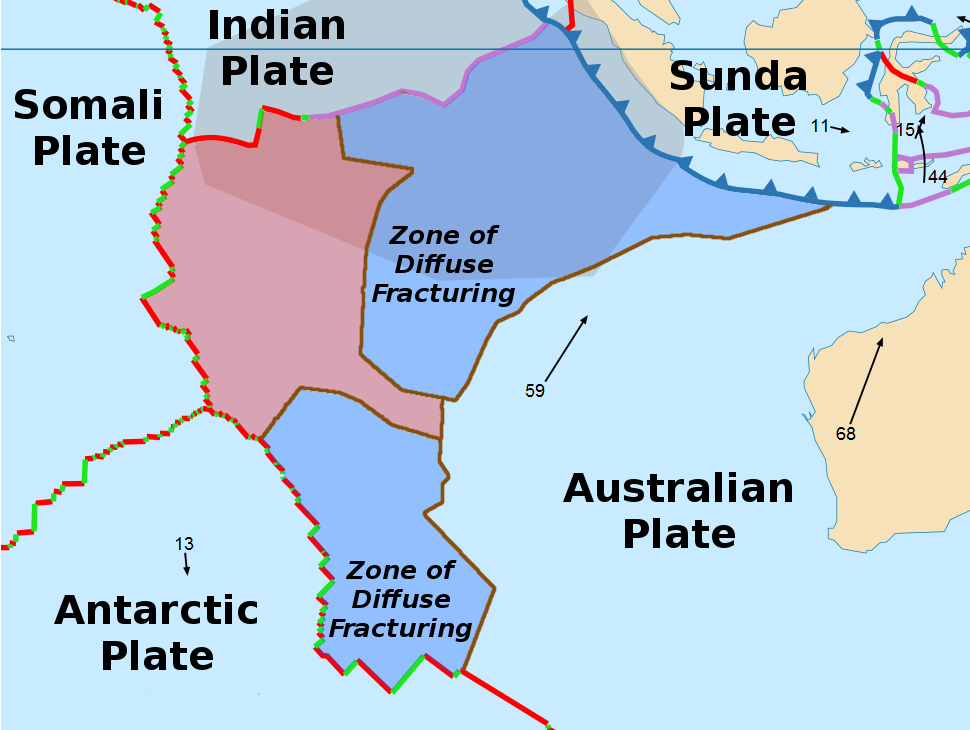
- Type: Minor (proposed)
- Movement^{1}: north-east
- Speed^{1}: 59 mm (2.3 in)/year
- Features: Indian Ocean
- ^{1}Relative to the African plate

The Capricorn plate is a proposed minor tectonic plate lying beneath the Indian Ocean basin in the Southern Hemisphere and Eastern Hemisphere.

The original theory of plate tectonics, as accepted by the scientific community in the 1960s, assumed fully rigid plates and relatively narrow, distinct plate boundaries. However, research in the late 20th and early 21st centuries suggests that certain plate junctions are diffuse across several dozen or even hundreds of kilometres.

The Capricorn plate is a relatively rigid piece of oceanic crust along the far western edge of the former Indo-Australian plate. The Capricorn plate was once joined with the Indian plate and the Australian plate to form the Indo-Australian plate, but recent studies suggest that the Capricorn plate began separating from the Indian and Australian plates between 18 million years ago and 8 million years ago along a wide, diffuse boundary.
