= 2008 Simeulue earthquake =

Earthquake in Indonesia

- Location within Sumatra
- UTC time: 2008-02-20 08:08:30
- ISC event: 13214445
- USGS-ANSS: ComCat
- Local date: 20 February 2008
- Local time: 15:08 WITA
- Magnitude: 7.4 M_{wc}
- Depth: 26.0 km (16.2 mi)
- Epicenter: 2.768°S 95.964°E
- Fault: Sunda megathrust
- Type: Thrust
- Areas affected: Aceh Province, Indonesia
- Max. intensity: MMI VIII (Severe)
- Tsunami: None
- Foreshocks: Yes
- Aftershocks: Yes
- Casualties: 4 dead, 25 injured

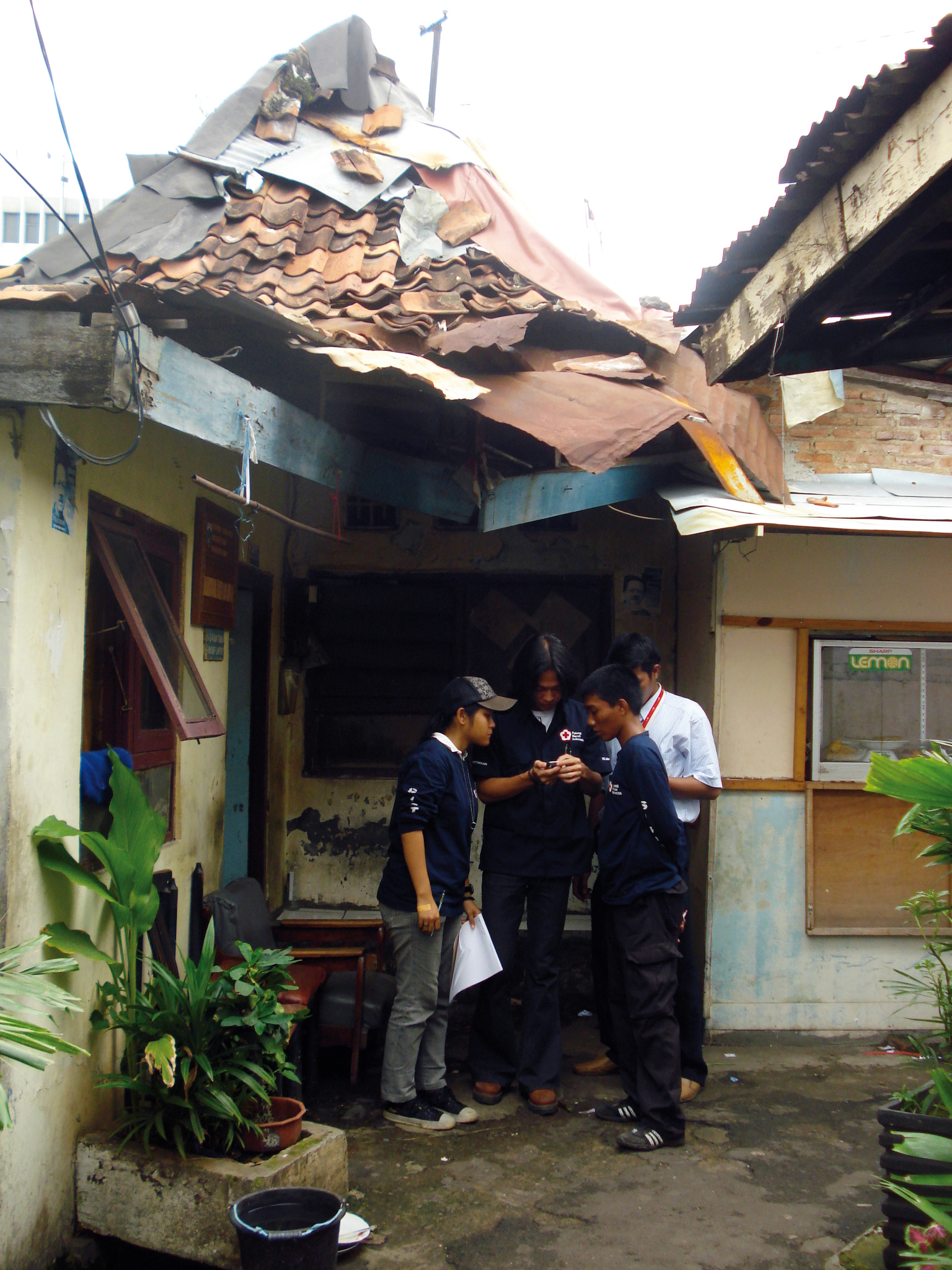
Damage assessment by the Indonesian Red Cross.

On February 20, 2008, an earthquake with a moment magnitude of 7.4 struck off the coast of Sumatra at a hypocentre depth of 26 km. The earthquake had an epicenter located on the island of Simeulue, northwest from Sinabang, a small town on the island. Three people were killed and an additional 25 seriously injured as a result of the earthquake.

== Tectonic setting ==
The west coast of Sumatra is dominated by the Sunda megathrust; a 5,000 km long convergent boundary where the Australian plate subducts beneath the Burma plate and Sunda plate at a rate of 60 mm/yr. The subduction zone offshore Sumatra has been responsible for several large earthquakes in 2004 and 2005.

== Earthquake ==
The Simeulue earthquake occurred as a result of thrust faulting along the subduction zone where the Australian and Burma plates meet. It earthquake had an epicenter close to another magnitude 7.4 earthquake in 2002. That was considered a foreshock of the 2004 event. The rupture patch for the 2008 event is located between the southern rupture area of the 2004 quake, and the northern rupture for another 2005 quake. Prior to this quake, that section of the megathrust was considered a seismic gap that last ruptured in 1797. It was not considered an aftershock of neither the 2004 or 2005 earthquakes. During the earthquake in 2008, a circular rupture area with a diameter of 60 km broke and slipped for 2.2 meters at its maximum.

=== Damage and casualties ===
Four people were reported killed and 25 suffered serious injuries from the quake. The earthquake damaged many buildings in Simeulue due to the strong ground shaking. It was felt in northern Sumatra, the Malay Peninsula, Singapore, and even Thailand. This caused many residents along the Sumatran coast to evacuate for fear of a tsunami.

== See also ==
- List of earthquakes in 2008
- List of earthquakes in Indonesia
