= 2012 Indian Ocean earthquakes =

2012 earthquake near Aceh Province, Indonesia

- Location within Indian Ocean
- UTC time: 2012-04-11 08:38:36; 2012-04-11 10:43:10
- ISC event: 600860404
- USGS-ANSS: ComCat; ComCat
- Local date: 11 April 2012
- Local time: 15:38:36; 17:43:10
- Magnitude: 8.6 M_{w}; 8.2 M_{w}
- Depth: 20.0 km (12.4 mi); 25.1 km (15.6 mi)
- Epicenter: 2.311°N 93.063°E
- Type: Strike-slip – Intraplate
- Areas affected: Indonesia
- Max. intensity: MMI VII (Very strong)
- Tsunami: Yes, 1 m (3.5 ft)
- Foreshocks: 7.2 M_{w} 10 Jan at 18:36
- Aftershocks: 8.2 M_{w} 11 April at 10:43 UTC
- Casualties: 10 dead 12 injured

The 2012 Indian Ocean earthquakes were magnitude 8.6 and 8.2 M_{w} undersea earthquakes that struck near the Indonesian province of Aceh on 11 April at 15:38 local time. Initially, authorities feared that the initial earthquake would cause a tsunami and warnings were issued across the Indian Ocean; however, these warnings were subsequently cancelled. These were unusually large intraplate earthquakes and the largest strike-slip earthquake ever recorded.

== Tectonic setting ==
The 2012 earthquake's epicenter was located within the Indo-Australian plate, which is divided into two sub- or proto-plates: the Indian, and Australian. At their boundary, the Indian and Australian plates converge at 11 mm (0.4 in) per year in a NNW–SSE direction. This convergence is accommodated by a broad zone of diffuse deformation. As part of that intraplate deformation, north–south trending fracture zones have been reactivated from the Ninety East Ridge as far east as 97°E.

The Indo–Australian plate was formed after the amalgamation of the Indian plate and the Australian plate some 45 million years ago. However, there is a relative movement between the Indian plate and the Australian plate. A process which would eventually split the Indo-Australian plate in two probably started 8 to 10 million years ago and is still taking place. The 2012 Indian Ocean earthquake is associated to the reactivation of the NNE-striking sea floor fabric.

== Earthquake ==
The magnitude 8.6 (M_{w}) earthquake occurred about 610 km (379 mi) southwest of Banda Aceh, Indonesia at 08:38 UTC on 11 April 2012. The earthquake occurred at a depth of 22.9 km (14.2 mi), which is considered relatively shallow according to the scale used by the United States Geological Survey (USGS). The quake was originally reported as a magnitude 8.9, but was later downgraded to 8.6. It was felt as far away as Malaysia, the Maldives and in India. The earthquake was caused by a strike-slip motion. The earthquake and the largest aftershock (magnitude 8.2, at 10:43 UTC on 11 April) had a fault displacement of 21.3 m (70 ft). The strike-slip nature of the earthquake meant that the movement displaced relatively little seawater and was less likely to cause a tsunami.

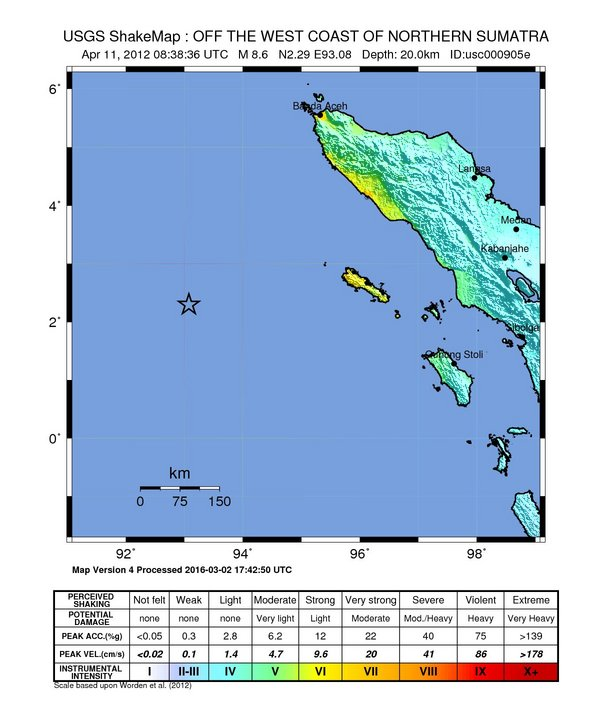
USGS ShakeMap for the M8.6 event

Both the initial earthquake and the magnitude 8.2 aftershock were classified (based on their focal mechanisms) as strike-slip earthquakes, meaning that the crust on either side shifted against each other horizontally, rather than vertically. Since 2006 there have been three other earthquakes in the area with a similar faulting style. All these earthquakes were consistent with either left-lateral slip on SSW–NNE orientated strike-slip faults, or right-lateral slip on WNW–ESE orientated strike-slip faults, both compatible with the direction of convergence. A back projection analysis of data collected by Hi-net, an observation network in Japan, found a complex pattern of four conjugate faults. There was a strong correlation between the fault rupture pattern and the distribution of the aftershocks.

These earthquakes have a complex rupture process. The rupture of these earthquakes occurred on multiple, almost orthogonal faults. This is rare in a single earthquake. This earthquake had an overall relatively slow rupture speed, although the speed was above the S-wave velocity in some fault segments. The rupture may have affected the crust and the upper mantle according to the kinematic source inversion. The rupture was caused by ductile shear heating instability which is different from frictional failure and operates between 600–800 °C (1,112–1,472 °F), which corresponds to about the depths of 40–60 km (25–37 mi). The serpentinization of oceanic lithosphere can lead to a low friction coefficient, but the reaction is possible only up to 400–500 °C (752–932 °F), which corresponds to the depth of about 25 km (16 mi). A single dynamic weakening mechanism which can work over the whole range of slip of this earthquake is still to be identified.

=== Impact ===
Ten people died from heart attacks or shock; six from Aceh Besar Regency, and one each from Banda Aceh, Lhokseumawe, Aceh Barat Daya and Padang Pariaman. Four serious injuries and eight minor injuries were reported in Aceh Singkil, Aceh Barat, Aceh Selatan and Simeulue regencies including a child who was critically injured by a falling tree. People in Indonesia, Thailand and India left their homes and offices in fear of tsunamis. People headed for higher ground in parts of Indonesia and Malaysia. In Aceh, where 31,000 people were killed in the 2004 Indian Ocean earthquake and tsunami, people were reported weeping. Some people used cars and motorcycles to reach higher ground. Patients were reportedly wheeled out of hospitals, some with drips attached to their arms. One hotel guest was slightly injured when he jumped out of his window to save himself. In Aceh Barat, one bridge collapsed and a dormitory was damaged. One home and the walls of a prison collapsed, and another house and an office was damaged in Aceh Besar.

The earthquake was felt over a large area, including Indonesia, the Maldives, Sri Lanka, India, Nepal, Bhutan, China, Bangladesh, Myanmar, Thailand, Malaysia, Laos, Cambodia, Singapore, and Vietnam. Shaking was felt across the eastern coast of India including Chennai, Bangalore, Kochi, Bhubaneswar, Vizag and Kolkata. The Metro Rail services were suspended in Kolkata, and passengers were asked to leave stations. In peninsular Malaysia, shaking was felt in Penang and Kuala Lumpur. The tremor was felt in Colombo, Sri Lanka, where people in some high-rise buildings were evacuated. In China, the earthquake was felt in Tibet, however, while places closer to the epicenter such as Yunnan and Guangxi did not report shaking.

=== Aftershocks ===
A magnitude 8.2 aftershock struck at a depth of 16.4 kilometres (10.2 mi) about 430 km (267 mi) southwest of Banda Aceh at 10:43 UTC, two hours after the initial earthquake. It was oddly reported as an 8.8 M_{w} before being quickly downgraded. Many aftershocks with magnitude readings between 5.0 and 6.0 were recorded for several hours after the initial earthquake which hit the west coast of northern Sumatra. Since the initial magnitude 8.6 earthquake, there have been 111 aftershocks over magnitude 4.0 according to USGS, including a magnitude 6.2 on 15 April 2012.

== Tsunami warnings ==
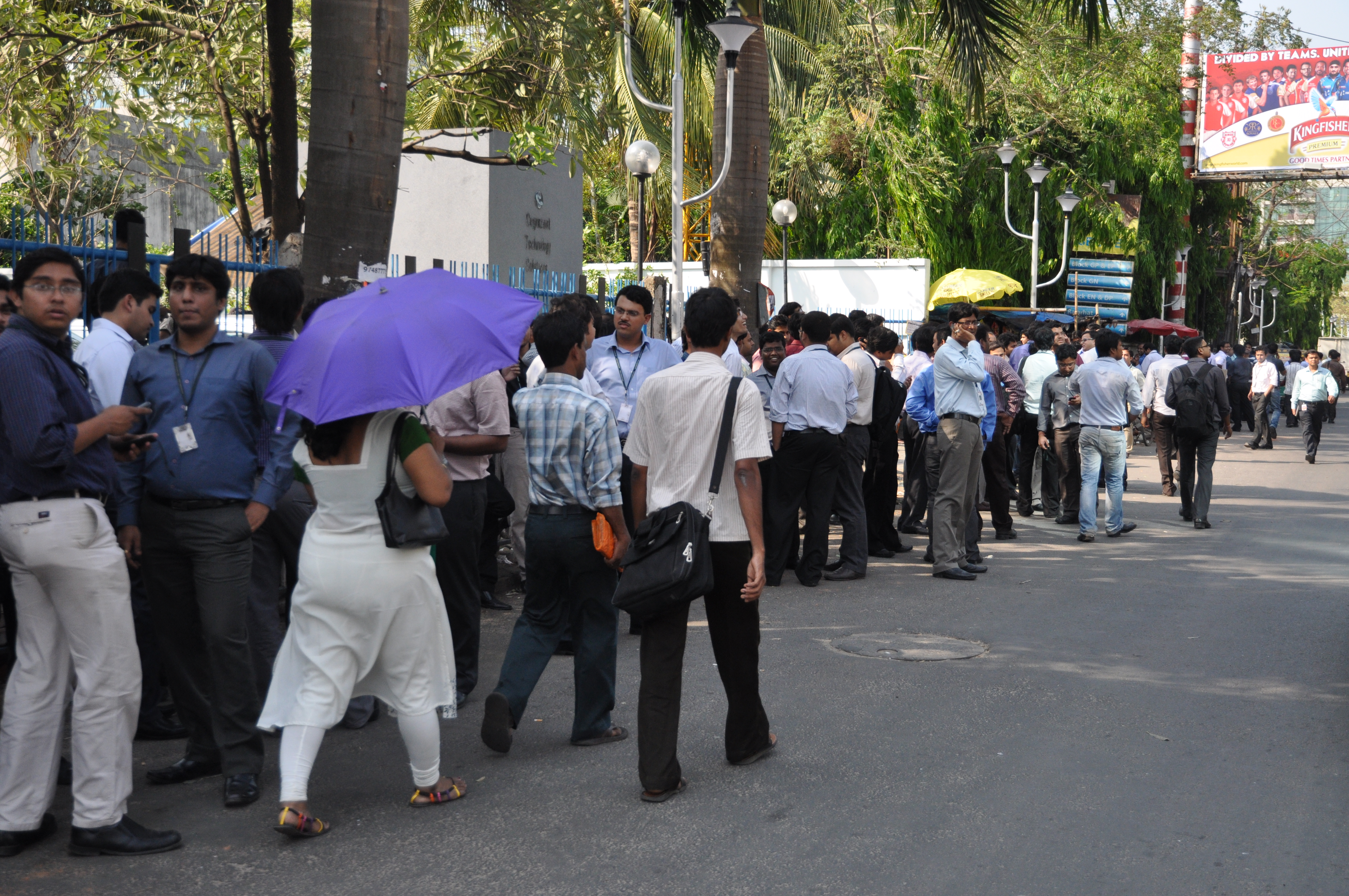
People evacuating high rise buildings on the streets in Kolkata, India, in front of the Cognizant building.

Three hours after the initial quake it was still unclear whether a tsunami had been generated or if a tsunami had done any significant damage. A geophysicist from the Pacific Tsunami Warning Center (PTWC) stated that a gauge closest to the epicenter recorded a wave peak of about 1 m (3 ft). The Pacific Tsunami Warning Center said that at 10:14 UTC that a tsunami was generated and may have already caused some coastal destruction. A seismologist from the British Geological Survey said that the "tearing earthquake" displaced relatively little water and was therefore unlikely to cause a significant tsunami. Indonesian authorities also issued a statement saying that the likelihood of a tsunami was low.

Tsunami warnings were issued in the following countries: Indonesia, Australia, Cambodia, Malaysia, Singapore, Thailand, Myanmar, Bangladesh, India, Sri Lanka, Maldives, Pakistan, Iran, United Arab Emirates, Oman, Yemen, Somalia, Kenya, Tanzania, Seychelles, Mozambique, Mauritius, Comoros, Madagascar, South Africa and the dependencies of Diego Garcia as part of the British Indian Ocean Territories, Crozet Islands, Réunion and Kerguelen Islands. Projected tsunami arrival times in GMT were: 8:38 for Indonesia, 11:38 for Sri Lanka, 14:38 for the Seychelles, 17:38 for Madagascar and 20:38 for South Africa.

=== India ===
After the earthquake, the Indian National Centre for Ocean Information Services (INCOIS) issued a high-level tsunami warning for the Andaman and Nicobar Islands. Authorities told civilians to move away from the coast and towards higher ground. Areas subject to warnings included Tamil Nadu, Andhra Pradesh and the Union Territory of Andaman and Nicobar Islands. Prabkhakar Rao of the disaster control room in Port Blair said that there could be tsunamis as high as 1.5 m (4.9 ft) at Port Blair and 3.9 m (12.8 ft) at Campbell Bay.

In Kolkata, underground Metro Railways services were stopped and tall office buildings and shopping malls were evacuated. Navy warships were put on high alert. The Indian Air Force dispatched two C-130s and one Il-76 aircraft to the Andaman islands.

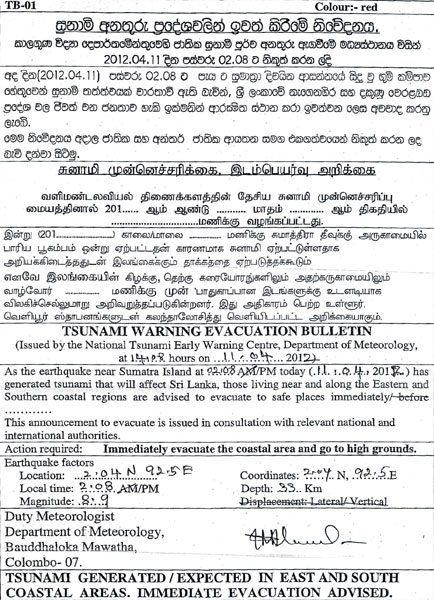
Evacuation order issued by Ministry of Disaster Management and Human Rights in Sri Lanka

=== Sri Lanka ===
The Ministry of Disaster Management and Human Rights (Sri Lanka) authorised an evacuation order at 9:08 UTC advising people living near coastal regions to move to higher ground. The initial quake was not expected to affect Sri Lanka, but aftershocks were being monitored. Deputy Director M. D. Dayananda said that a tsunami could hit Trincomalee.

As part of a risk mitigation measure, the Ceylon Electricity Board disconnected power supplies to coastal areas and railway control rooms. Coastal train services were suspended. The Road Development Authority removed toll charges from the Southern Expressway to aid the evacuation. Coastal bus services were temporarily re-routed.

=== Thailand ===
Six Andaman coast provinces urged people to go to high ground and stay away from areas that could be affected. Phuket International Airport was closed. The alerts caused panic as people fled buildings and made for high ground.

During the initial earthquake and for more than two hours after, none of Thailand's free television stations reported the earthquake or tsunami warnings, preferring to continue a live broadcast of a royal family ceremony, despite the National Broadcasting and Telecommunications Commission (NBTC)'s urgent order directing the emergency information to be broadcast instead without delay. This caused criticism on the internet, although it was muted by a lèse majesté law. The Television Pool of Thailand defended their actions, saying that running texts about the warnings were displayed onscreen during the broadcast.

== Tsunami ==
Small 0.5 m (20 in) waves, within regular tide limits, were reported in the Campbell Bay area of Great Nicobar Island, and 10 cm (4 in) waves were reported in Thailand. The Indonesian Agency for Meteorology, Climatology and Geophysics said three small tsunamis struck the Aceh coast. The highest was 80 cm (31 in), at Meulaboh. After the sea was seen receding about 10 metres (33 ft) at Simeulue, a 1 m (3 ft) wave was observed. Simeulue is an island of fishing villages 150 km (93 mi) off the west coast of Sumatra.

== See also ==
- List of earthquakes in 2012
- List of earthquakes in Indonesia
