= Microatoll =

Circular colony of coral

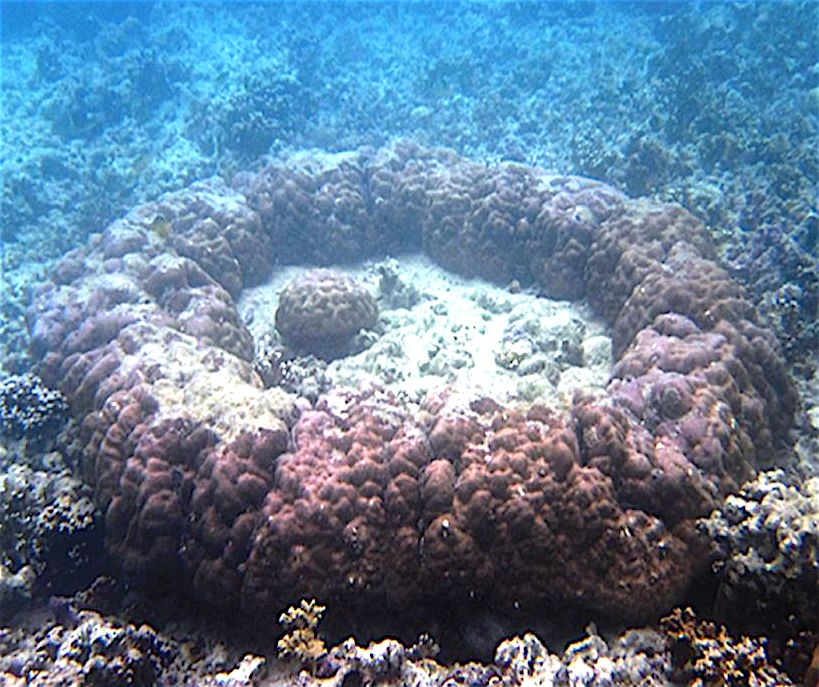
In intertidal reef-flat environments, massive Porites form characteristic microatoll formations, with living coral around the perimeter and dead skeleton on the exposed upper surface.

A microatoll is a circular colony of coral, dead on the top but living around the perimeter. Growth is mainly lateral, as upward growth is limited by exposure to air. Microatolls may be up to 6 meters (20 ft) in diameter. They are named for their resemblance to island atolls formed during the subsidence of volcanic islands, as originally suggested by Darwin (1842).

They act as natural recorders of sea level, which allows the monitoring of sea level changes in response to global warming. They have also been used to quantify and date changes in relative sea level in seismically active areas, and to provide information on changes in sea surface temperature using oxygen isotope values as a proxy.

== Terminology ==
The term 'microatoll' was first used by Krempf in 1927, although his description lacks a precise definition. Kuenen defined it in 1933 as "a colony of corals" with "a raised rim, more or less completely surrounding a lower, dead surface". This definition has been extended to include similar structures built by non-coral reef-building organisms such as serpulid worms, pelecypods and vermetid gastropods.

== Occurrence ==
Microatolls are found only in corals that grow in the lower intertidal zone on shallow reef flats. Microatolls are formed by several species of the genus Porites, but examples have also been described from Acropora, Heliopora, Favia, Favites, Platygyra, Cyphastrea and Goniastrea.

== In climate research ==
=== Paleogeodesy ===
The detailed record of sea level change preserved in fossil microatolls, combined with precise dating of individual annual rings using the Uranium-thorium dating method, allows them to be used to determine past relative sea-level change with uncertainties of about 20 centimeters (7.9 in) in level and a few years to a few decades in time. They have been used to map the rupture areas of great to giant earthquakes and to estimate the recurrence interval of such events before historic records are available.

=== Sea surface temperatures ===
Changes in oxygen isotope ratios in fossil microatolls have also been used to provide high-resolution proxy records for sea surface temperature over the last few thousand years.

== See also ==
- 1833 Sumatra earthquake
