= 2000 Enggano earthquake =

Earthquake affecting Indonesia

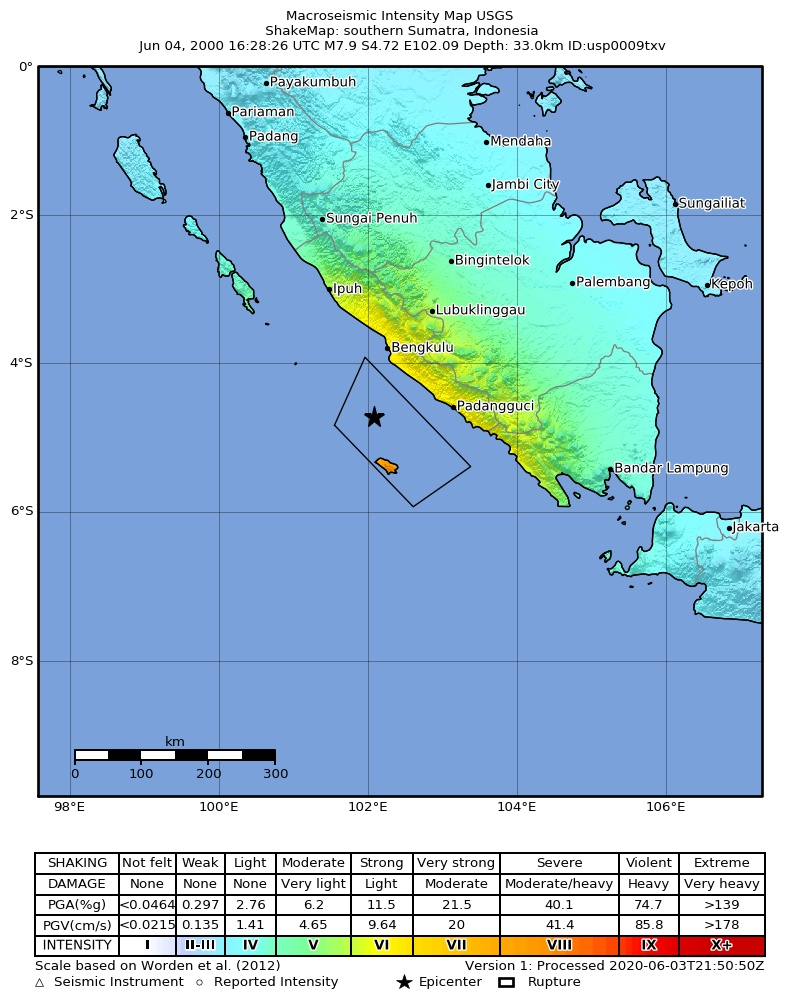
- USGS ShakeMap for the event

- Location within Sumatra
- UTC time: 2000-06-04 16:28:26
- ISC event: 1736014
- USGS-ANSS: ComCat
- Local date: June 4, 2000
- Local time: 23:28:26 WIB (UTC+7)
- Duration: 40 seconds
- Magnitude: 7.9 M_{w}
- Depth: 35 km (22 mi)
- Epicenter: 4.61°S 102.06°E
- Fault: Sunda megathrust
- Type: Strike-slip (first subevent); Megathrust (second subevent)
- Areas affected: Bengkulu, Indonesia
- Total damage: Severe
- Max. intensity: MMI VIII (Severe)
- Foreshocks: M_{w} 5.0 on 3 June
- Aftershocks: 346 M_{w} 4.0+ (as of 31/12/2000); Strongest: M_{w} 7.6
- Casualties: 103–141 fatalities 2,185–2,585 injuries

On 4 June 2000, at 23:28 WIB, southern Sumatra in Indonesia was struck by an earthquake of M_{w} 7.9 with a maximum Mercalli intensity of VIII (Severe). The event occurred off the coast near Enggano Island. There were more than 100 fatalities and up to 2,585 injuries. Over 340 aftershocks shook the area throughout the rest of 2000, one just eleven minutes after the mainshock.

This was the first and southernmost in a series of very large to great Sumatran earthquakes in the 2000s to rupture almost the entire western part of the Sunda megathrust, most notably including the 2004 Indian Ocean, 2005 Nias–Simeulue and 2007 Bengkulu earthquakes.

== Background and tectonics ==
Indonesia is well known for strong earthquakes: the 2000 Enggano event marked the beginning of an ongoing period of seismic activity in the area, highlighted by the 2004 Indian Ocean earthquake. The 2000 Enggano earthquake took place at the southeastern end of the fault segment that ruptured during the 1833 Sumatra earthquake. This group of earthquakes, in addition to the 2005 Nias–Simeulue earthquake, all ruptured along the megathrust that forms the interface between the Australian and Sunda plates. This event was the only one not to cause a damaging tsunami.

== Earthquake ==
The earthquake involved the rupture of two different faults with different mechanisms. The first subevent ruptured a north–south striking fault within the Australian plate with a left lateral strike-slip mechanism. The earthquake rupture propagated northwards until it reached the megathrust, triggering the second subevent along the Sunda megathrust itself. The strike-slip rupture probably represents slip on a pre-existing fracture zone, similar to the likely cause of the M 7.9 earthquake that struck about 1,000 km to the south on 18 June 2000 with a similar mechanism.

According to a finite fault model released by the USGS, the earthquake rupture extended over 190 km (120 mi) by 35 km (22 mi) from northwestern Seluma Regency to southwest of Enggano Island. The zone of the largest slip occurred south-southwest of the hypocenter, where up to 6.154 m (20.19 ft) of slip was produced. Another zone of slip occurred north-northeast of the hypocenter, producing 5.223 m (17.14 ft) of slip. The entire rupture process took nearly 40 seconds with the greatest phase of seismic moment release occurring nearly 25 seconds after initiation.

By 31 December 2000, there were 346 aftershocks exceeding M_{w} 4.0 that extended about 190 km (120 mi) along a northwest–southeast trend, with some occurring directly beneath Enggano Island. The largest of these measured M_{w} 7.6 and struck north-northeast of the mainshock on 4 June.

== Damage and casualties ==
According to the USGS' PAGER-CAT catalog, the earthquake killed 103 people and injured up to 2,585 others, however the International Federation of Red Cross and Red Crescent Societies reported 141 deaths. At least 85 people were killed, 2,185 were injured, 354 houses were destroyed and 669 others were damaged in mainland Bengkulu, with 43 deaths in North Bengkulu, 39 in South Bengkulu Regency and three in Central Bengkulu. The city's main hospital partially collapsed, with only multiple exterior walls remaining. Roads connecting to the city were also severely damaged, and power outages were widespread, with 80% of the affected areas still without power by 9 June.

Although there were only reports of minor injuries, ninety percent of houses were destroyed on Enggano Island; All concrete structures collapsed and most wooden structures were severely damaged there. In the village worst struck, several hundred structures were reported in ruins.

== Aftermath and response ==
International relief teams arrived in the region within several days. Relief efforts were impeded by fallen telephone poles, which blocked the supplies. The main problem found in the affected areas was a lack of water supply and electricity, these facilities having been cut off by oscillation. Pope John Paul II expressed his "sincere sympathy" for those families stricken by the earthquake. He called for a rapid international response to the quake, and said he would keep its victims in his prayers. A Taiwanese rescue team was sent to help victims of the tremor, the first country to take part in rescue efforts from Asia. The United States donated US$ 25,000 instantly to relief organizations, Japan offering a grant of US$140,000 and Australia US$143,000 in addition to a two-person team of emergency relief examiners. Students from the University of Bengkulu traveled in Red Cross teams consisting of seven people, pulling victims out of the rubble and taking them to first aid posts staffed by their colleagues, while politician Mar'ie Muhammad spent three days in Bengkulu, visiting affected areas and organizing the continuation of the relief operation with local authorities. Volunteers helped donate 1,000 of a total of 15,000 family kits containing cooking utensils, sarongs, sleeping mats, plastic sheeting and hygienic items. Over 400 of the kits were loaded onto a boat and 40 volunteers and the International Federation relief delegate traveled to Enggano Island to carry out the first distribution.

== Wharton Basin event ==
2000 Wharton Basin earthquake
- Location within Indian Ocean
- UTC time: 2000-06-18 14:44:13
- ISC event: 1736624
- USGS-ANSS: ComCat
- Local date: June 18, 2000
- Local time: 21:14:13 CIT (UTC+6:30) 21:44:13 WIB (UTC+7)
- Magnitude: 7.9 M_{w}
- Depth: 10 km (6.2 mi)
- Epicenter: 13.802°S 97.453°E
- Type: Intraplate
- Areas affected: Cocos (Keeling) Islands
- Max. intensity: MMI II (Weak)
- Tsunami: 30 cm (0.98 ft)
- Aftershocks: 17 (As of 27/06/2000)
- Casualties: None

Two weeks later on June 18, another M_{w} 7.9 event occurred about 1,000 kilometers (620 mi) to the southwest in the Wharton Basin. At the time, it was the largest intraplate earthquake in the Indian Ocean until the 2012 Indian Ocean earthquakes. The earthquake knocked items from shelves and triggered a 30 cm (0.98 ft) tsunami at the Cocos (Keeling) Islands, near the epicenter.

== See also ==
- List of earthquakes in 2000
- List of earthquakes in Indonesia
