= 2007 Bengkulu earthquakes =

Earthquakes affecting Indonesia

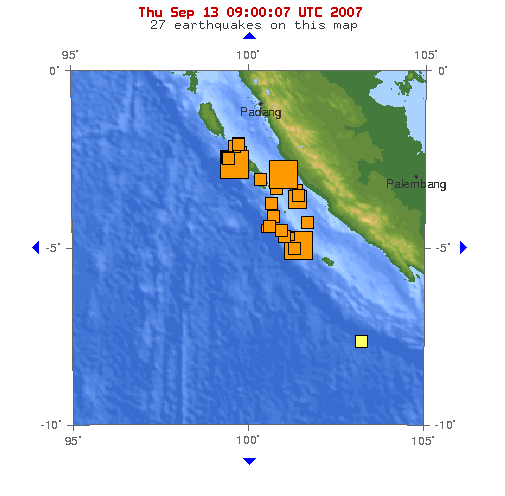
- Map showing the 3 large quakes and 22 pre and aftershocks in a span of 24 hours.

- Location within Sumatra Location within Indonesia
- UTC time: A: 2007-09-12 11:10:26; B: 2007-09-12 23:49:03
- ISC event: A: 13203322; B: 13203366
- USGS-ANSS: A: ComCat; B: ComCat
- Local date: 12 September 2007 13 September 2007
- Local time: A: 18:10; B: 06:49
- Magnitude: A: 8.4 M_{w}; B: 7.9 M_{w}
- Depth: 34.0 kilometres (21.1 mi)
- Epicenter: 4.407°S 101.502°E; 2.572°S 100.761°E
- Type: Megathrust
- Areas affected: Indonesia; Singapore; Malaysia; Thailand
- Max. intensity: MMI VI (Strong)
- Tsunami: Yes
- Casualties: 25 dead, 161 injured

The 2007 Bengkulu earthquakes were a series of megathrust earthquakes that struck the Sunda Trench off the coast of Sumatra, Indonesia, with three of magnitude 7 or greater. A series of tsunami bulletins was issued for the area. The most powerful of the series had a magnitude of 8.4, which makes it in the top 20 of the largest earthquakes ever recorded on a seismograph.

== Timeline ==
The first earthquake occurred at 11:10:26 UTC (18:10 local time) on 12 September 2007, and was an 8.4 M_{w} earthquake on the moment magnitude scale. It had a focal depth of 34 km, at 4.520°S 101.374°E, about 130 km southwest of Bengkulu on the southwest coast of Sumatra, Indonesia, and some 600 km west-northwest of Indonesia's capital city, Jakarta. It was followed by several earthquakes of magnitude 5 through 6 along the same fault, west of Sumatra.

The second largest earthquake, 7.9 M_{w}, occurred later the same day at 23:49:04 UTC (06:49:04 local time the following day). It was centred about 35 km underground, at 2.625°S 100.841°E, some 185 km (115 mi) south-southeast of Padang, Indonesia and about 205 km northwest of Bengkulu (about 225 km northwest of the magnitude 8.4 earthquake).

After further aftershocks above magnitude 5, a third large earthquake, 7.0 M_{w}, occurred at 03:35:28 UTC (10:35:28 local time) on 13 September. It was centred about 10 km underground, at 2.130°S 99.627°E, some 165 km south-southwest of Padang and 345 km west-northwest of Bengkulu. It is regarded as an aftershock of the two larger earthquakes.

Aftershocks continued into 13 September and 14 September, with more earthquakes ranging up to magnitude 6.4. Most of the aftershocks have been northwest of the original magnitude 8.4 earthquake. A 6.7 struck Southern Sumatra on Sept 20, 2007.

Tidal buoys positioned in the Indian Ocean and other seismic tools have led scientists to issue a series of tsunami bulletins.

== Effects ==
The tremors of the 8.4 M_{w} earthquake lasted for several minutes. It caused buildings to sway in Jakarta, and some buildings were reported to have collapsed in the city of Bengkulu, Bengkulu Province, about 100 km (62 mi) from the epicenter. Tremors felt in Jakarta were described as being "violent". It was reported that several high-rise buildings were evacuated. The earthquake also led to a power outage in Bengkulu, which crippled communications. The death toll of the earthquakes is 25 with 161 people injured.

Tremors were felt in neighbouring countries as far away as Southern Thailand. In Singapore, which is about 670 km (416.3 mi) from the epicenter, the tremor was felt at around 11:10 UTC (19:10 local time). Most of the Central and Eastern part of Singapore had felt the tremor. In Peninsular Malaysia, tremors were reported after 19:15 local time, including Kuala Lumpur, Putrajaya, Johor Bahru, Malacca and Penang. Like Singapore, the tremors were most severe on high-rises, resulting in minor panic and evacuations. No casualties were reported in the country, as of 13 September.

== Tsunami ==
Sea level readings indicated that a tsunami was generated. A total of 4 tsunami alerts were issued in 24 hours. After the first, and largest, earthquake, the Pacific Tsunami Warning Centre issued a tsunami alert for much of the Indian Ocean basin. A tsunami approximately 1 metre high was reported at Padang, Indonesia. A 1.5 metre tsunami was observed in Sikakap beach on South Pagai Island. A small tsunami, some 15 cm high, was reported at the Cocos Islands. Sumatra was taken off tsunami alert after two hours. A weak tsunami caused some damage in Serangai, located north of Bengkulu. The tsunami had a flow depth of 3.5 m (11 ft) and maximum run-up of 5 m (16 ft), measured on a cliff top.

Tsunami warnings were also issued in India and other countries around the Indian Ocean soon after the earthquake. The Government of India asked the states of Tamil Nadu, Kerala, Andhra Pradesh and the union territories of Andaman and Nicobar Islands and Puducherry to be on high alert. By late 12 September, the tsunami warning was recalled. Similarly, a tsunami alert was issued in Peninsular Malaysia at 20:50 (local time) for the coastal areas of Perlis, Kedah, Perak and Penang; the alert was lifted two hours later. However, Malaysian authorities had detected a 1–3 m (3.3–9.8 ft) high tsunami heading away from the epicenter of the earthquake.

== Tectonic summary ==
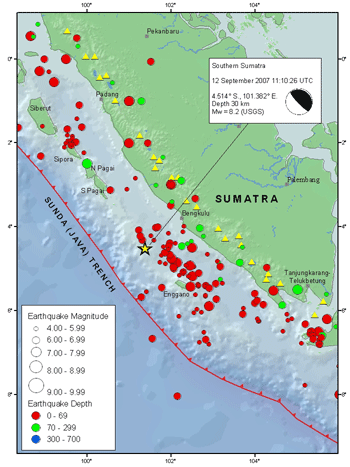

According to the US Geological Survey, the earthquake was caused by thrust faulting on the boundary between the Australian Plate and the Sunda Plate which ruptured a 250 × 170 km section of the subduction interface. At the location of the earthquake, offshore of the west coast of Sumatra, the Australia plate moves northeast with respect to the Sunda Plate at a velocity of about 69 mm/year, oblique to the orientation of the plate boundary. The component of plate motion perpendicular to the boundary produces thrust faulting on the offshore plate-boundary.

The magnitude 7.9 earthquake was also a result of thrust faulting on the same plate boundary. It occurred about 225 km northwest of the magnitude 8.4 earthquake, at the northern end of the aftershock zone. This event ruptured 2 different patches of the interface, each separated by a distance of 120 km and around 50 × 40 km in size or less.

The magnitude 8.4 earthquake was the most powerful earthquake of 2007 to date, more powerful than the two March 2007 Sumatra earthquakes nearby and the 2007 Peru earthquake. It was the second most powerful earthquake since the magnitude 9.3 2004 Indian Ocean earthquake, exceeded only by the magnitude 8.6 2005 Nias–Simeulue earthquake. The two largest earthquakes were the fourth and fifth earthquakes with magnitude 7.9 or greater to have occurred on or near the plate boundaries offshore of western Sumatra in 7 years, the others being the magnitude 7.9 earthquake of 4 June 2000; the magnitude 9.3 2004 Indian Ocean earthquake on 26 December 2004; and the magnitude 8.6 Nias–Simeulue earthquake on 28 March 2005.

According to data from the Japanese PALSAR microwave sensor aboard the Daichi(ALOS) satellite, South Pagai Island was uplifted, creating 6 new islands, and exposing previously submerged coral reefs as well as enlarging existing islands.

== See also ==
- List of earthquakes in 2007
- List of earthquakes in Indonesia
- March 2007 Sumatra earthquakes
