= Megathrust earthquake =

Type of earthquake at convergent plate boundaries

Megathrust earthquakes occur at convergent plate boundaries, where one tectonic plate is forced underneath another. The earthquakes are caused by slip along the thrust fault that forms the contact between the two plates. These interplate earthquakes are the planet's most powerful, with moment magnitudes (M_{w}) that can exceed 9.0. Since 1900, all earthquakes of magnitude 9.0 or greater have been megathrust earthquakes.

The thrust faults responsible for megathrust earthquakes often lie at the bottom of oceanic trenches; in such cases, the earthquakes can abruptly displace the sea floor over a large area. As a result, megathrust earthquakes often generate tsunamis that are considerably more destructive than the earthquakes themselves. Teletsunamis can cross ocean basins to devastate areas far from the original earthquake.

== Terminology and mechanism ==
Diagram of a subduction zone. The megathrust fault lies on the top of the subducting slab where it is in contact with the overriding plate.

The term megathrust refers to an extremely large thrust fault, typically formed at the plate interface along a subduction zone, such as the Sunda megathrust. However, the term is also occasionally applied to large thrust faults in continental collision zones, such as the Himalayan megathrust. A megathrust fault can be 1,000 kilometers (600 mi) long.

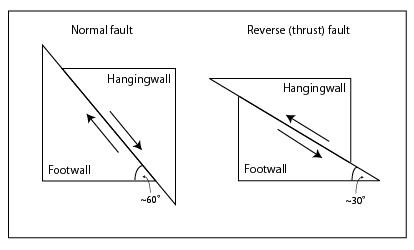
Cross-sectional illustration of normal and reverse faults

A thrust fault is a type of reverse fault, in which the rock above the fault is displaced upwards relative to the rock below the fault. This distinguishes reverse faults from normal faults, where the rock above the fault is displaced downwards, or strike-slip faults, where the rock on one side of the fault is displaced horizontally with respect to the other side. Thrust faults are distinguished from other reverse faults because they dip at a relatively shallow angle, typically less than 45°, and show large displacements. In effect, the rocks above the fault have been thrust over the rocks below the fault. Thrust faults are characteristic of areas where the Earth's crust is being compressed by tectonic forces.

Megathrust faults occur where two tectonic plates collide. When one of the plates is composed of oceanic lithosphere, it dives beneath the other plate (called the overriding plate) and sinks into the Earth's mantle as a slab. The contact between the colliding plates is the megathrust fault, where the rock of the overriding plate is displaced upwards relative to the rock of the descending slab. Friction along the megathrust fault can lock the plates together, and the subduction forces then build up strain in the two plates. A megathrust earthquake takes place when the fault ruptures, allowing the plates to abruptly move past each other to release the accumulated strain energy.

== Occurrence and characteristics ==
Megathrust earthquakes are almost exclusive to tectonic subduction zones and are often associated with the Pacific and Indian Oceans. These subduction zones are also largely responsible for the volcanic activity associated with the Pacific Ring of Fire.

Since these earthquakes deform the ocean floor, they often generate strong tsunami waves. Subduction zone earthquakes are also known to produce intense shaking and ground movements that can last for up to 3–5 minutes.

In the Indian Ocean region, the Sunda megathrust is located where the Indo-Australian plate subducts under the Eurasian plate along a 5,500 kilometres (3,400 mi) fault off the coasts of Myanmar, Sumatra, Java and Bali, terminating off the northwestern coast of Australia. This subduction zone was responsible for the 2004 Indian Ocean earthquake and tsunami. In parts of the megathrust south of Java, referred to as the Java Trench, for the western part, M_{w} 8.9 is possible, while in the eastern Java segment, M_{w} 8.8 is possible, while if both were to rupture at the same time, the magnitude would be M_{w} 9.1.

In the South China Sea lies the Manila Trench, which is capable of producing M_{w} 9.0 or larger earthquakes, with the maximum magnitude at M_{w} 9.2 or higher.

In Japan, the Nankai megathrust under the Nankai Trough is responsible for Nankai megathrust earthquakes and associated tsunamis. The largest megathrust event within the last 20 years was the magnitude 9.0–9.1 Tōhoku earthquake along the Japan Trench megathrust.

In North America, the Juan de Fuca plate subducts under the North American plate, creating the Cascadia subduction zone from mid Vancouver Island, British Columbia down to Northern California. This subduction zone was responsible for the 1700 Cascadia earthquake. The Aleutian Trench, of the southern coast of Alaska and the Aleutian Islands, where the North American plate overrides the Pacific plate, has generated many major earthquakes throughout history, several of which generated Pacific-wide tsunamis, including the 1964 Alaska earthquake; at magnitude 9.1–9.2, it remains the largest recorded earthquake in North America, and the third-largest earthquake instrumentally recorded in the world.

In the Himalayan region, where the Indian plate subducts under the Eurasian plate, the largest recorded earthquake was the 1950 Assam–Tibet earthquake, at magnitude 8.7. It is estimated that earthquakes with magnitude 9.0 or larger are expected to occur at an interval of every 800 years, with the highest boundary being a magnitude 10, though this is not considered physically possible. Therefore, the largest possible earthquake in the region is a magnitude 9.7, assuming a single rupture of the whole Himalayan arc and assuming standard scaling law, which implies an average slip of 50 m.

A megathrust earthquake could occur in the Lesser Antilles subduction zone, with a maximum magnitude of 9.3.

The largest recorded megathrust earthquake was the 1960 Valdivia earthquake, estimated between magnitudes 9.4–9.6, centered off the coast of Chile along the Peru-Chile Trench, where the Nazca plate subducts under the South American plate. This megathrust region has regularly generated extremely large earthquakes.

The largest possible earthquakes are estimated at magnitudes of 10 most likely caused by a combined rupture of the Japan Trench and Kuril–Kamchatka Trench, or individually, the Aleutian Trench or Peru–Chile Trench. Another possible area could be the Lesser Antilles subduction zone.

A study reported in 2016 found that the largest megathrust quakes are associated with downgoing slabs with the shallowest dip, so-called flat slab subduction.

Compared with other earthquakes of similar magnitude, megathrust earthquakes have a longer duration and slower rupture velocities. The largest megathrust earthquakes occur in subduction zones with thick sediments, which may allow a fault rupture to propagate for great distances unimpeded.

== See also ==
- Lists of earthquakes
