= Indo-Australian plate =

Major tectonic plate formed by the fusion of the Indian and Australian plates

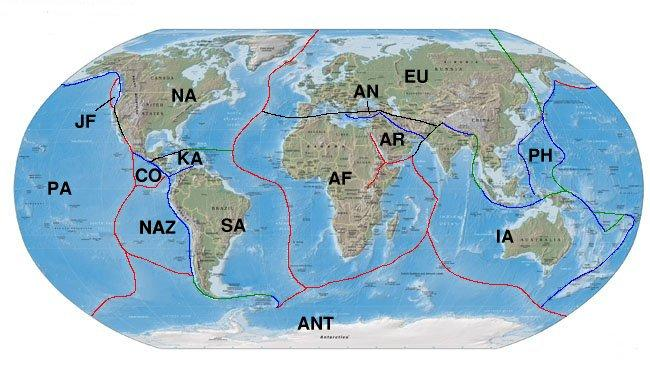
Map showing the Indo-Australian plate (IA) and other major plates

The Indo-Australian plate, shown as its two subdivisions: the Indian plate (red) and the Australian plate (orange)

The Indo-Australian plate is or was a major tectonic plate. It is in the process of separation into two or three plates, and may be currently separated into more than one plate. It contains the continent of Australia, its surrounding ocean and extends north-west to include the Indian subcontinent and the adjacent waters.

== Formation ==
It was formed by the fusion of the then Indian and the then Australian plates approximately 43 million years ago. The fusion happened when the mid-ocean ridge in the Indian Ocean, which separated the two plates, ceased spreading.

== Regions ==
Australia-New Guinea (Mainland Australia, New Guinea, and Tasmania), the Indian subcontinent, and Zealandia (New Caledonia, New Zealand, and Norfolk Island) are all fragments of the ancient supercontinent of Gondwana. As the ocean floor broke apart, these land masses fragmented from one another, and for a time these centers were thought to be dormant and fused into a single plate. However, research in the early 21st century indicates plate separation of the Indo-Australian plate may have already occurred.

== Characteristics ==
The eastern side of the plate is the convergent boundary with the Pacific plate. The Pacific plate sinks below the Australian plate and forms the Kermadec Trench and the island arcs of Tonga and Kermadec. New Zealand is situated along the southeastern boundary of the plate, which with New Caledonia makes up the southern and northern ends of the ancient landmass of Zealandia, which separated from Australia 85 million years ago. The central part of Zealandia sank under the sea.

The southern margin of the plate forms a divergent boundary with the Antarctic plate. The western side is subdivided by the Indian plate that borders the Arabian plate to the north and the African plate to the south. The northern margin of the Indian plate forms a convergent boundary with the Eurasian plate, which constitutes the active orogenic process of the Himalayas and the Hindukush mountains.

The northeast side of the Australian plate forms a subduction boundary with the Eurasian plate in the Indian Ocean between the borders of Bangladesh and Burma and to the southwest of the Indonesian islands of Sumatra and Borneo. Along the northern Ninety East Ridge under the Indian Ocean there appears to be a weakness zone where the Indian and Australian plates are going different ways. The subsidence boundary through Indonesia is reflected in the Wallace line.

== Plate movements ==
The eastern part (Australian plate) is moving northward at the rate of 5.6 cm (2.2 in) per year while the western part (Indian plate) is moving only at the rate of 3.7 cm (1.5 in) per year due to the impediment of the Himalayas. In terms of the middle of India and Australia's landmasses, Australia is moving northward at 3 cm (1.2 in) per year relative to India. This differential movement has resulted in the compression of the former plate near its centre at Sumatra and the possible division into the separate Indian and Australian plates again.

A third plate, known as the Capricorn plate, may also be separating off the western side of the Indian plate as part of the continued breakup of the Indo-Australian plate.

=== Separation ===
There is good evidence that the Indo-Australian plate is in the process of separation into new plates. Recent studies and evidence from seismic events such as the 2012 Indian Ocean earthquakes, suggest that the Indo-Australian plate may have already broken up into two or three separate plates due primarily to stresses induced by the collision of the Indo-Australian plate with Eurasia along what later became the Himalayas, and that the Indian plate and Australian plate may have been separate since at least 3 million years ago.

Contemporary models suggest at present there is a deformation zone between the Indian and Australian plates, with both earthquake and global satellite navigation system data indicating that India and Australia are not moving on the same vectors northward. In due course, some expect a well defined localized boundary to reform between the Indian and Australian plates. Studies show the Ninety East Ridge has active faulting along its whole length so that while the simplest explanation is that the Indian and Australian plates have already separated here, it remains possible that only the Capricorn plate has separated from them.
