= Simeulue language =

Austronesian language spoken in Indonesia

Simeulue
- Simolol
- Long Bano
- Native to: Indonesia
- Region: Simeulue, Banyak Islands, Babi Island, Lasia Island (Aceh)
- Ethnicity: Simeulue people Haloban people
- Native speakers: (undated figure of 30,000)
- Language family: Austronesian: Malayo-Polynesian; Northwest Sumatra–Barrier Islands; Simeulue
- Dialects: Devayan; Haloban (id); Simolol

Language codes
- ISO 639-3: smr
- Glottolog: sime1241
- Distribution of Simeulue language speakers in the Simeulue and surrounding islands (smr)

The Simeulue language (Long Bano) also known as Simolol is spoken by the Simeulue people of Simeulue island off the western coast of Sumatra, Indonesia. It's also spoken in surrounding islands such as Banyak Islands, this language is closely related to the Sigulai language which is also spoken on the island of Simeulue and also to the Nias language spoken on the neighboring island of Nias.

== Names ==
Simeulue is also called Mae o, which literally means 'Where are you going?'. Ethnologue also lists Long Bano, Simalur, Simeuloë, Simolol, and Simulul as alternate names.

== Varieties ==
Simeulue is spoken in five of eight districts (kecamatan) of Simeulue Regency and in the Banyak Islands, Aceh Singkil Regency. It includes at least three dialects.

- Devayan: spoken in the four southern districts of Teupah Selatan, Simeulue Timur, Teupah Barat, and Teluk Dalam.
- Simolol (prestige dialect): spoken around Kampung Aie in Simeulue Tengah.
- Haloban: spoken in two villages in Banyak Islands, namely Haloban and Asantola. It has 15.000 native speakers according to Ethnologue.

Sikule and Leukon, related to Nias, is spoken in Salang, Alafan, and Simeulue Barat in northern Simeulue, while Jamee (also called Kamano), related to Minangkabau, is spoken in the capital city of Sinabang and has become the lingua franca of the island.

== Phonology ==
Consonants
	Labial	Alveolar	Palatal	Velar	Glottal
Plosive	p b	t d	c ɟ	k g	ʔ
Fricative		s			h
Nasal	m	n	ɲ	ŋ	
Approximant	w	r, l	j		

- The phonemes /d c ɟ g j ɲ/ do not appear word-finally.
- /ɲ/ also does not appear word-initially.

Vowels
	Front	Central	Back
High	i		u
Mid-high	e	ə	o
Mid-low	ɛ		ɔ
Low		a	

Additionally, the following diphthongs have been observed: /au/, /ai/, /ɔi/.

== See also ==
- Simeulue people
- Sikule language
- Haloban language
