= Simeulue people =

Indigenous people group

Simeulue
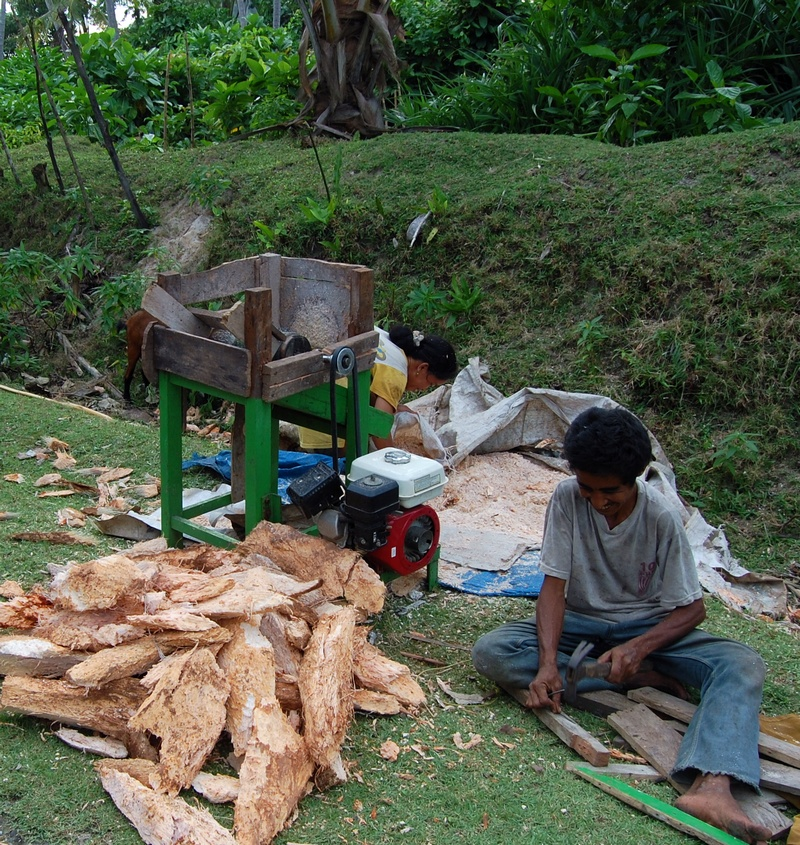
- A man and woman crushing the pith of sago palm in Simeulue Island, Indonesia.

Total population
- 53,500

Regions with significant populations
- Indonesia (Simeulue Island)

Languages
- Simeulue, Sigulai, Jamee, and Indonesian

Religion
- Sunni Islam

Related ethnic groups
- Sigulai • Haloban (id) • Nias

The Simeulue people (other names include Simalur, Simeuloë, Simulul, Long Bano, and Devayan) are an indigenous people inhabiting Simeulue Island off the west coast of Sumatra, Indonesia. They are mostly found in Teupah Barat, Simeulue Timur, Simeulue Tengah, Teupah Selatan, and Teluk Dalam districts. The Simeulue people speak Simeulue, a Northwest Sumatra–Barrier Islands language closely related to Sikule (which is also spoken in Simeulue Island), Haloban (id) (spoken in the Banyak Islands; considered a dialect of Simeulue), and Nias (spoken in neighbouring Nias Island). The language also has a strong Acehnese and Minangkabau (Jamee) influence.

The Simeulue people became more widely known worldwide after the 2004 Indian Ocean earthquake and tsunami because of their high survival rate. Their survival was credited to their tradition of oral history. A previous tsunami in 1907 had affected the island, and stories told about it served as disaster preparation. Only 7 people of the total population (78,000 at the time) died in the 26 December 2004 tsunami.
