= Aneuk Jamèë =

Minangkabau diaspora in western and southern parts of Aceh

Aneuk Jamèë Minangkabau people in Aceh Acehnese Minangkabau
Aneuk Jamèë

Total population
- 76,000

Regions with significant populations
- Indonesia (Aceh)

Languages
- Jamèë (native); Acehnese and Indonesian (others)

Religion
- Islam

Related ethnic groups
- Acehnese; Minangkabau

Aneuk Jamèë is an Acehnese term referring to the Minangkabau diaspora who inhabit or settled in the southwestern regions of Aceh (in Aceh Singkil, South Aceh, Southwest Aceh, and parts of Simeulue) in northernmost of the Indonesian island of Sumatra. They speak a distinctive dialect of Minangkabau, known as Jamèë.

They parted from the larger Minangkabau society due to the common intermarriage to some Aceh-based people, namely Acehnese, Kluet, Singkil, and Simeulue.

== Nomenclature ==
“Aneuk Jamèë” is an Acehnese-origin compound terminology, literally means '[the] foreigners', from aneuk (lit. 'children') and jamèë (lit. 'guest').

== History ==
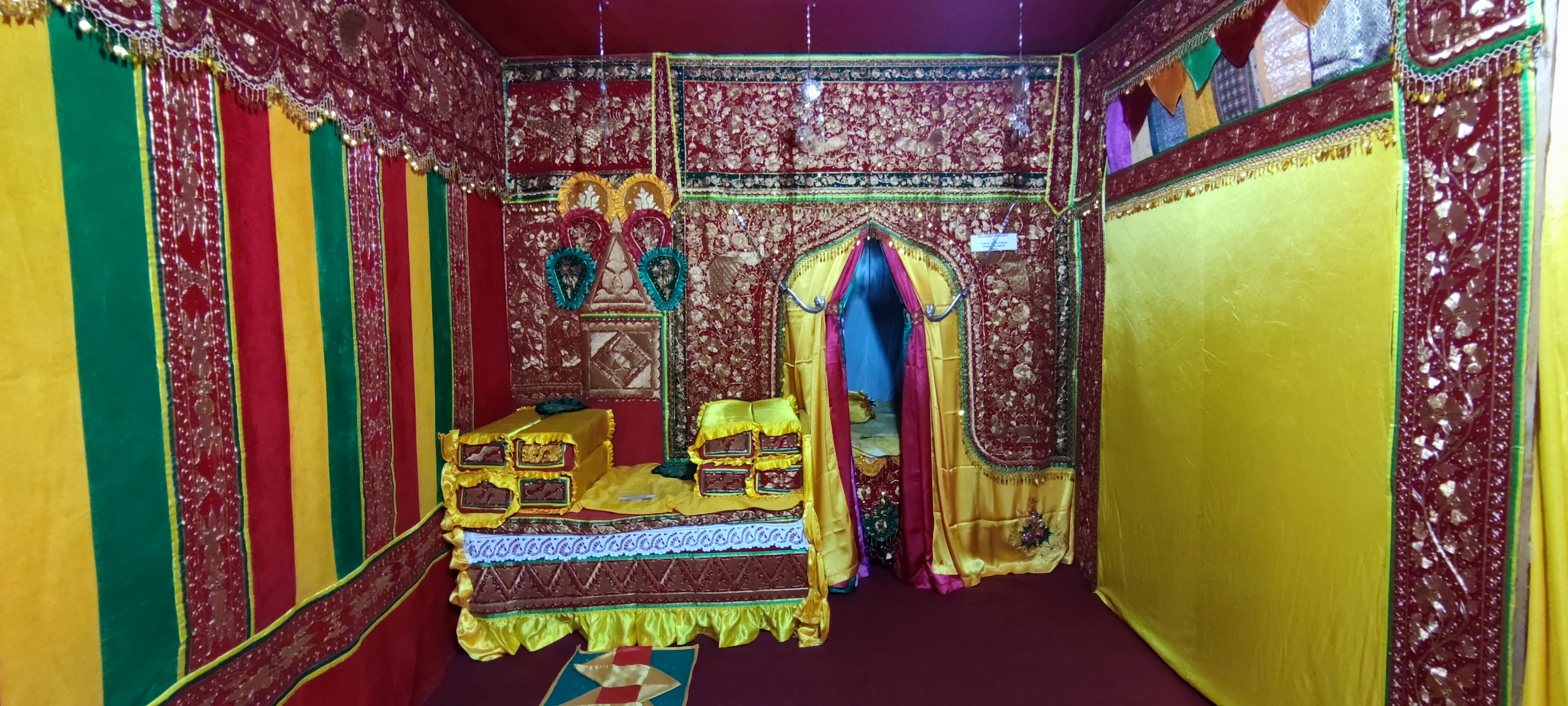
Traditional wedding bed room of Aneuk Jamee

Story has it that during the Padri War, the vicar fighters were cornered by the attacks of the Dutch East Indies. The coast line of the Minangkabaus at that time were a part of the Aceh kingdom, sent military aid. When the situation became critical, the people were forced to leave. Thus at that time, the Minangkabau people started to spread towards the southwest coast of Aceh. It is also said that South Aceh Regency was a stop-by for pilgrimers from West Sumatra sailing for Mecca.

== Geographic distribution ==
The Aneuk Jamee people can be found especially in South Aceh Regency (approximately 50% of the population) and to a certain extent in Southwest Aceh Regency, West Aceh Regency, Aceh Singkil Regency, and Simeulue Regency.

Regions that are inhabited by the Aneuk Jamee people:

Regency	Area
South Aceh Regency	Districts: South Kluet, Labuhanhaji, West Labuhanhaji, East Labuhanhaji, Samadua, and Tapaktuan
Southwest Aceh Regency	District: Susoh and Manggeng
West Aceh Regency	They are generally concentrated in a number of villages in Meureubo district (along with the Acehnese people) namely Gunong Kleng, Peunaga, Meureubo, Ranto Panyang, and its surrounding regions. Apart from that, a number of them also dwell in Padang Seurahet village which is under the Johan Pahlawan district. Generally what was said recently is that the descendants of those that came from South Aceh Regency have occupied West Aceh Regency for generations a long time ago.
Simeulue Regency	Sinabang
Aceh Singkil Regency	Singkil town, Pulau Banyak district (with three villages namely: Pulau Balai, Pulau Baguk, and Teluk Nibung)

== Language ==
The Minangkabau language is still used by the Aneuk Jamee people but the language is assimilated with the Acehnese language, thus making it Jamee (guest) language. There are not much changes made to the language except for a few consonants, vocals and changes in the dialect. In terms of linguistic classification, the Jamee language still belongs to the Minangkabau language as a dialect. However, due to the influence of cultural assimilation for a long time, most of the Aneuk Jamee people, especially of those who occupy regions that are dominated by the Acehnese people for example West Aceh Regency, the Aneuk Jamee language is only used among the older generations. Today the Acehnese language is much widely used as the lingua franca.

== Notable people ==
- Abuya Muda Waly, Acehnese great ulama
- Ismail Suny, Indonesian diplomat
