= Haloban =

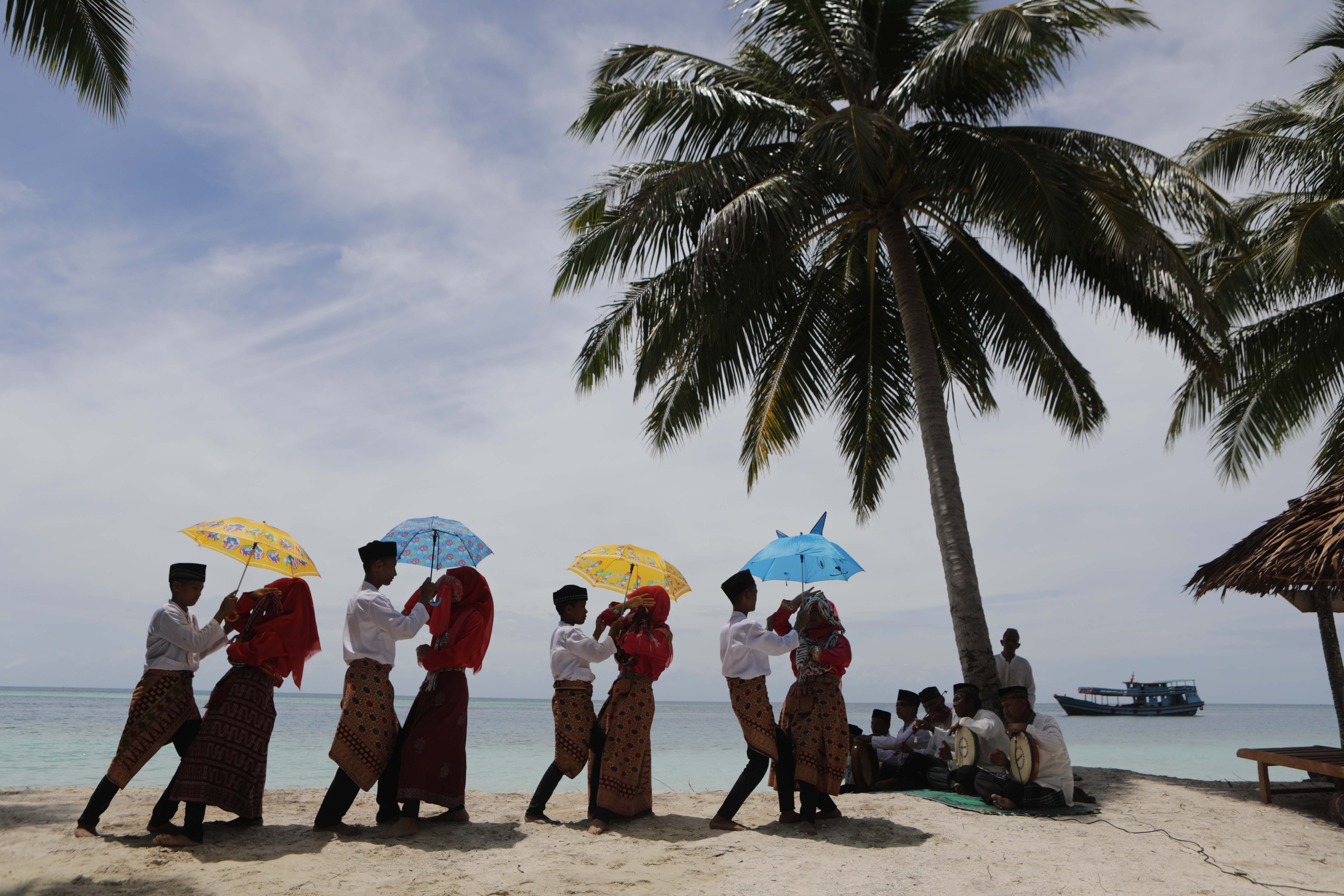
- Dancers performing the Pulau Pinang dance from Pulau Banyak, Aceh, Indonesia.

- Location in Sumatra
- Coordinates: 2°14′N 97°14′E
- Country: Indonesia
- Province: Aceh
- Island: Tuangku

Haloban is the largest village on the island of Tuangku in the Banyak Islands, off Sumatra. It is located on the northern shore of the island.

== Language ==
Haloban language, an Austronesian language spoken by the native Haloban people of two villages on the Banyak Islands, Haloban and Asantola. This is the native language there, considered a dialect of the Simeulue language.

Other languages including Jamee language, a Minangkabau immigrant (Aneuk Jamee) language, serve as local lingua franca. Nias language is spoken by the natives of Nias people in the two neighboring villages of Ujung Sialit and Suka Makmur, as their group language only. In addition, Indonesian language as the national language is also used.
