= Sigulai language =

Austronesian language spoken in Indonesia

Sigulai
- Efulae Dau Batu
- Native to: Indonesia
- Region: Simeulue, Aceh
- Ethnicity: Sigulai
- Native speakers: (undated figure of 20,000)
- Language family: Austronesian: Malayo-Polynesian; Northwest Sumatra–Barrier Islands; Northern Barrier Islands; Nias–Sikule; Sigulai

Language codes
- ISO 639-3: skh
- Glottolog: siku1242
- Distribution of Nias language speakers in Simeulue island (skh)

The Sigulai language (also called Sibigo, Sikule, Ageumeui, or Wali Banuah) is an Austronesian language spoken on Simeulue island off the western coast of Sumatra in Indonesia. It belongs to the Malayo-Polynesian branch of the Austronesian languages. Sikule is one of Northwest Sumatra–Barrier Islands languages, which are a sub-group of Western Malayo-Polynesian.

Sikule is spoken in Salang, Alafan and Simeulue Barat district, on the northern of Simeulue island. It is apparently related to the Nias language. Ethnologue lists Lekon and Tapah as dialects.

Simeulue is spoken in the rest of Simeulue outside of Alafan, while Jamu (also called Kamano), related to Minangkabau, is spoken in the capital city of Sinabang.

== Vocabulary ==
Sigulai is most closely related to Nias language, spoken on the island of Nias. However, it also shares many vocabulary similarities with Simeulue, spoken on the same island. The following is vocabulary in Sigulai.

Gloss	Sigulai
Interrogatives vocabulary
what	ati, atei
who	ate'ila
why	tolawu
how	atayya
where	a'ué
where to	aumey'i
where from	aufuluyi
how much	galofè
when	gafai
Pronouns vocabulary
I	yètu
you	yège, yami
he	ifei
they	i'ila
we	yaga, i'ita
Numerals vocabulary
one	amba
two	dumba
three	tulu
four	efa
five	lima
six	ene
seven	fitu
eight	olu
nine	siwa
ten	fulu
Verbs vocabulary
go	me'i
walk	deuleu
eat	manga
drink	manginu
sleep	mele'
sit	dadau'
stand	indô-indô
run	khumundung
bath	mondi
lift	bengkè'
Times vocabulary
yesterday	mènèfi
tomorrow	fôngi
the day after tomorrow	mèlè fungilanin
morning	subu
afternoon	pastô
evening	aniôfi
night	akhemi
earlier	mènoa
later	inu'te
now	lali' ila
a moment	akhajap
formerly	nafi'i
Adverbs vocabulary
top	alawa
bottom	eteu, fa'aleu
left	bilok
right	gambele
side	ngayi
here	mandé'é
there	uhan, mènèn
front	khaifena
behind	khaifuli
this	mandé
that	mènèn
Basics vocabulary
in	kha
to	miy'èn
want	bakha
can	deyi
very	faga'a, kali
yes	e'e
no	ukhai'
don't	deyya'
for	miyège
with	afe
there is	u
already	mola
not yet	ya'na'e
just	ama'
within	khaybakha
not	ténga
Adjectives vocabulary
many	uguya
few	atepénga
less	deahô' uguya
more	atua
enough	deila
Nouns vocabulary
board	fafa
lobster	lakhua'
betel nut	elan
coconut	boniô
village	gampung
ricefield	nofi, belang
island	ulau
lightning	lôlô
water	idane

== Phonology ==
The vowel and consonant phonemes of Sikule are shown in the tables below.

Sikule vowel phonemes
	Front	Central	Back
Close	i	ɨ	u
Mid	e	ə	o
Open		a	

Sikule consonant phonemes
		Labial	Alveolar	Post-alveolar/ Palatal	Velar	Glottal
Nasal		m	n	ɲ	ŋ	
Plosive/ Affricate	voiceless	p	t	t͡ʃ	k	(ʔ)
Plosive/ Affricate	voiced	b	d	d͡ʒ	ɡ	
Fricative			s		x	h
Approximant	median			j		
Approximant	lateral		l			
Trill			r			

== See also ==
- Simeulue language

== Sources ==
- Adelaar, Alexander, The Austronesian Languages of Asia and Madagascar: A Historical Perspective, The Austronesian Languages of Asia and Madagascar, pp. 1-42, Routledge Language Family Series, London, Routledge, 2005, ISBN 0-7007-1286-0
- Aziz, Z.; Amery, R. (2016). "A survey of the status of the local languages of Pulau Simeulue and Pulau Banyak and their use within the community". http://eeic.unsyiah.ac.id/proceedings/index.php/eeic/article/view/95. Syiah Kuala University.
- Candrasari, Ratri; Harinawati; Fasya, Teuku Kemal (2022-03-24). "Sigulai: One of Minority Language in Simeulue Island". Proceedings of the 2nd International Conference on Social Science, Political Science, and Humanities (ICoSPOLHUM 2021). Vol. 648. Atlantis Press. pp. 6–9. doi:10.2991/assehr.k.220302.002. ISBN 978-94-6239-552-7.
- Nothofer, Bernd, The Barrier Island Languages in the Austronesian Language Family, Focal II: Papers From the Fourth International Conference on Austronesian Linguistics, pp. 87-109, Pacific Linguistics, Series C 94, Canberra, Research School of Pacific and Asian Studies, The Australian National University, 1986.
