= Smong =

Simeulue folk tale

Smong is a folktale known among Simeulue people. The word "smong" is derived from the term Kemong or Semongan which means "tidal wave" in Devayan dialect of Simeulue language which is one of the native languages of people in Simeulue island. Smong is a traditional poem narrated and written by Muhammad Riswan after the 1907 tsunami that contains instructions on how to evacuate when an earthquake or tsunami occurs. Smong was passed down through oral communication. There is multiple versions of this poem, but the most common states (in English ) "It started with earthquakes followed by a giant wave the whole land was sinking immediately if the strong earthquake is followed by the receding of the ocean please hurry and find a higher place to run to." Smong is a source of pride for the citizens and they believe that it provides a basis for national discussion on devastating natural hazards. They believe that knowledge of smong can potentially substantially reduce and possibly eliminate casualties from tsunamis.

== Origin ==
The tale of Smong among Simeulue people was passed down through generation since the 1907 Sumatra earthquake which caused a devastating tsunami to the Simeulue island and northwester coast of Sumatra. This tale of Smong was commonly passed down through lullaby or poem that was recited in front of congregations across suraus in Simeulue island. There were many versions of this Smong tale, however, until one of the Simeulue cultural experts, Mohammad Riswan, famously known as "Moris" compiled several versions of the tale. He then narrated and wrote the tale downs into a structure poem which was written down mainly in Devayan dialect of Simeulue language.

== Text ==
The following is the complete text of "Smong" narrated by Muhammad Riswan.

Enggel mon sao curito
Inang maso semonan
Manoknop sao fano
Uwi lah da sesewan
Unen ne alek linon
Fesang bakat ne mali
Manoknop sao hampong
Tibo-tibo mawi
Anga linon ne mali
Uwek suruik sahuli
Maheya mihawali
Fano me singa tenggi
Ede smong kahanne
Turiang da nenekta
Miredem teher ere
Pesan dan navi da

Listen ye a story!
During the old time,
a village sank
that's what they said
it started with an earthquake,
followed then by a huge wave
the whole land sank
in a sudden
if the shaking were strong,
followed by receding (sea)water
immediately go looking for
your higher grounds to run to
the name is "smong", it came.
This history of our ancestors
truly remember it,
the message and its wisdom!
