= Babi Island (Aceh) =

Island in Indonesia

Babi
- Interactive map of Babi

Geography
- Location: South East Asia
- Coordinates: 2.083333°N 96.65°E

Administration
- Indonesia

Babi Island (Indonesian: Pulau Babi; literally meaning Pig Island) is an island located in Aceh, Indonesia.

== Overview ==
Babi Island is located off the coast of Sumatra, not far from the Banyak Islands and Lasia Island and between Bangkuru and Simeulue Islands. It is uninhabited. It is administratively part of Simeulue Regency, Aceh.

== History ==
Babi was affected by the 2005 Nias–Simeulue earthquake. According to United States Geological Survey researchers, the tsunami caused by the earthquake went 200 metres (660 ft) inland. They also reported that the earthquake caused 80 centimetres (31 in) of uplift, which dried the mangrove swamp on the island.

It is used as a nature tourism site, which covers a total area of 10 hectares (0.10 km^{2}).
