= SKH =

SKH, or skh, may refer to:

- Savez komunista Hrvatske, the League of Communists of Croatia, Yugoslavia, 1932-1990
- Sheng Kung Hui, the Anglican Church in Hong Kong, China
- SKH, the abbreviation for Sengkang General Hospital, Singapore
- SKH, the abbreviation for Stockholm University of the Arts, Stockholm
- SKH, the IATA code for Surkhet Airport, Nepal
- skh, the ISO 639-3 code for the Sikule language, spoken on Simeulue Island, Indonesia
- SKH, the National Rail code for St Keyne Wishing Well Halt railway station, Cornwall, UK
