= Enggano scops owl =

Conservation status
- Least Concern (IUCN 3.1)
- CITES Appendix II

Scientific classification
- Kingdom: Animalia
- Phylum: Chordata
- Class: Aves
- Order: Strigiformes
- Family: Strigidae
- Genus: Otus
- Species: O. enganensis

Binomial name
- Otus enganensis Riley, 1927

Species of owl

The Enggano scops owl (Otus enganensis) is an owl endemic to Enggano Island, Indonesia.

== Morphology ==
The Enggano scops owl is a chestnut colored owl with lighter areas on the throat and cheeks and a whitish "X" on the face It is similar in appearance to the Simeulue scops owl (Otus umbra), with a large bill and white barring on the flanks. It is slightly smaller that the Oriental scops owl (Otus sunia). The wingspan of the type specimen measured 14.2cm.

== Distribution and behavior ==
The Enggano scops owl exclusively inhabits Enggano island in Indonesia. It is found in forests and at forest edges. It has a deep and throaty call.

== Description and taxonomy ==
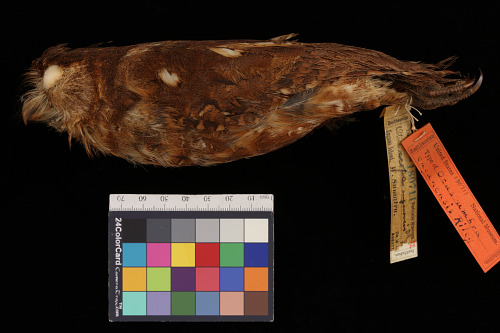
The type specimen of Otus enganensis.

The Enggano scops owl was described by the American ornithologist Joseph Harvey Riley in 1927 based on a museum specimen. It was initially described as a subspecies of the Simeulue scops owl, Otus umbra but is now considered to be a distinct species. The type specimen is held at the National Museum of Natural History in Washington, D.C.

== Human interactions ==
During an avian survey conducted on Enggano Island in 2020 local villagers were asked about the use of the island's bird species. The Enggano scops owl was not one of the species hunted by locals.
