= Simeulue Regency =

Regency in Aceh, Indonesia

Simeulue Regency Kabupaten Simeulue
- Regency
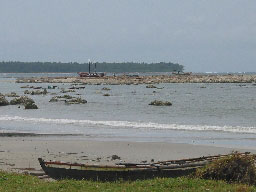
- Stranded boats and raised reefs at Busung, Gusong Bay, Simeulue, Indonesia, 8 April 2005

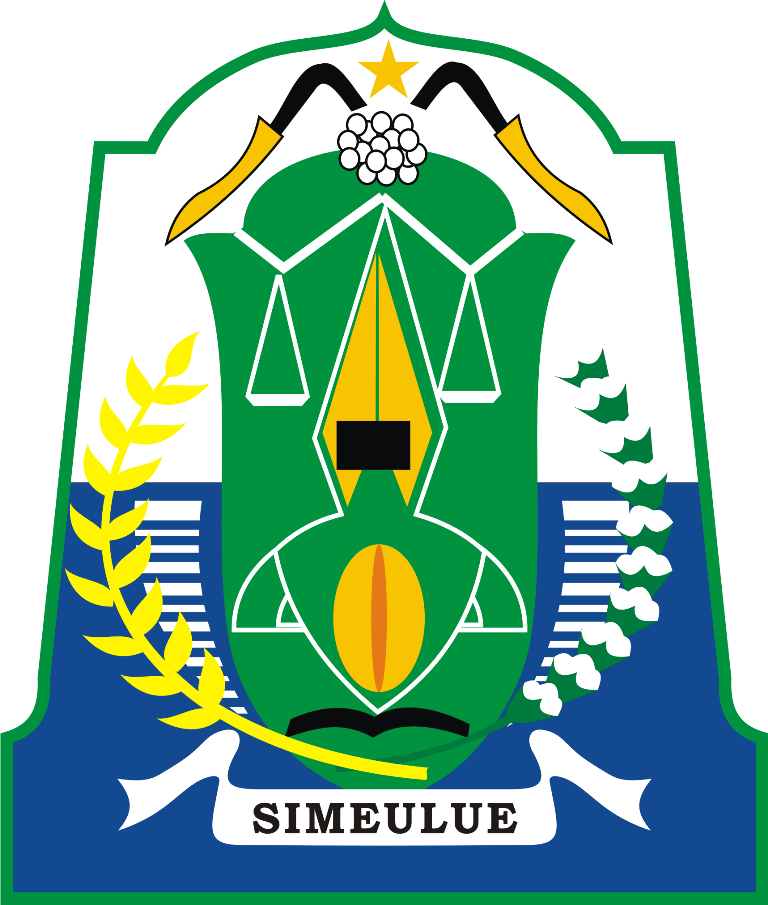
- Coat of arms

- Location within Aceh

- Location in Northern Sumatra Location in Sumatra Location in Indonesia
- Coordinates: 2°35′N 96°5′E
- Country: Indonesia
- Region: Sumatra
- Province: Aceh
- Established: 1999
- Capital: Sinabang

Government
  - Regent: Muhammad Nasrun Mikaris
  - Vice Regent: Nusar Amin

Area
  - Total: 1,838.1 km^{2} (709.7 sq mi)

Population (mid 2025 estimate)
  - Total: 97,529
  - Density: 53.060/km^{2} (137.42/sq mi)
- Time zone: UTC+7 (IWST)
- Area code: (+62) 650
- Website: simeuluekab.go.id

Simeulue Regency (Indonesian: Kabupaten Simeulue) is a regency in the Aceh special region of Indonesia. It occupies the whole island of Simeulue (Pulau Simeulue), 150 km off the west coast of Sumatra, which with its many small offshore islands covers a land area of 1,838.1 square kilometres (709.69 square miles). It had a population of 80,674 at the 2010 census and 92,865 at the 2020 census; the official estimate as at mid 2025 was 97,529 (comprising 49,920 males and 47,609 females).

With its isolated geographic location and its linguistic difference from mainland Aceh, Simeulue has not been affected by the turmoil of conflicts in mainland Aceh between the Indonesian government and the Free Aceh Movement (GAM, Acehnese: Geurakan Acèh Meurdèka / Gěrakan Aceh Měrdeka). There has been no major GAM activity on the island.

== Administration ==
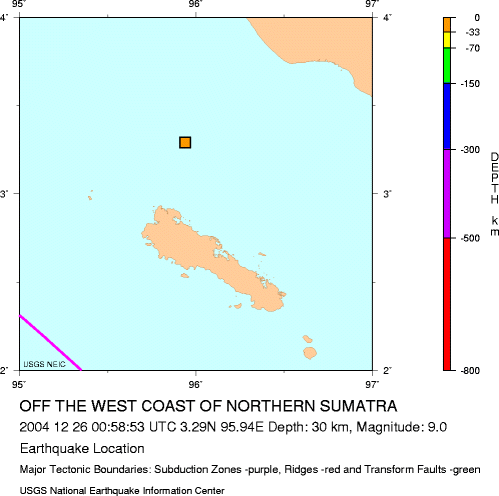
Map showing northwest coast of Sumatra and Simeulue, with the epicenter of the 2004 Indian Ocean earthquake indicated between the two.

Simeulue was originally a part of West Aceh Regency but was split off on 4 October 1999 to become its own regency with the hope that the island's development would improve. The seat of the regency is the town of Sinabang, situated on a bay (Laut Sinabang) on the northeast coast of the island.

The island was badly affected by the 2004 Indian Ocean earthquake and the subsequent tsunami, whose epicentre was directly north of the island, and between the island and the mainland of Sumatra.

The regency was divided at 2010 into eight districts (kecamatan), but two additional districts (Teupah Tengah and Simeulue Cut) were created in 2012. All are listed below with their areas and their populations at the 2010 census and 2020 census, together with the official estimates as of mid 2025. The table also includes the locations of the district administrative centres, the number of villages (kampong) and the number of offshore islands (of which just two are inhabited) in each district, and its post code.

Kode Wilayah	Name of District (kecamatan)	Area in km^{2}	Pop'n census 2010	Pop'n census 2020	Pop'n estimate mid 2025	Admin centre	No. of villages	No. of offshore islands	Post code
11.09.07	Teupah Selatan (South Teupah)	222.24	8,422	9,030	9,767	Labuhan Bajau	19	33 ^{(a)}	23898
11.09.04	Simeulue Timur (East Simeulue)	175.97	28,931	27,569	27,965	Sinabang	17	46 ^{(b)}	23891
11.09.03	Teupah Barat (West Teupah)	146.73	7,269	8,011	8,387	Salur	18	5 ^{(c)}	23897
11.09.09	Teupah Tengah (Central Teupah)	83.70	^{(d)}	6,593	6,882	Lasikin	12	2	23899
11.09.01	Simeulue Tengah (Central Simeulue)	112.48	9,010	7,312	7,708	Kampung Aie	16	0	23894
11.09.05	Teluk Dalam (Dalam Bay)	224.68	4,914	5,459	5,851	Salare-e	10	24	23890
11.09.10	Simeulue Cut	35.40	^{(e)}	3,382	3,590	Kuta Padang	8	1	23895
11.09.02	Salang	198.96	7,625	8,818	9,537	Nasreuhe	16	1	23896
11.09.06	Simeulue Barat (West Simeulue)	446.07	10,024	11,763	12,608	Sibigo	14	23	23892
11.09.08	Alafan	191.87	4,479	4,928	5,234	Langi	8	12	23893
	Totals	1,838.10	80,674	92,865	97,529	Sinabang	138	147	

Notes: (a) including Pulau Batu Belahir off the east end of Simeulue Island; also Pulau Lasia and Pulau Babi, islands to the southeast of Simeuleu, and midway between Simeulue Island and Bangkaru Island (the most southwestern of the Banyak Islands).
(b) of which the island of Pulau Siumat is inhabited. (c) of which the island of Pulau Teupah is inhabited.
(d) The 2010 population of the Teupah Tengah District is included in the figure for the Simeulue Timur District, from which it was cut out in 2012.
(e) The 2010 population of the Simeulue Cut District is included in the figure for the Simeulue Tengah District, from which it was cut out in 2012.

=== Villages ===
Administrative villages (kampong) listed for each district:

District	Villages
Teupah Selatan	Alus Alus, Ana Ao, Badegong, Batu Ralang, Blang Sebel, Kebun Baru, Labuhan Bajau, Labuhan Bakti, Labuhan Jaya, Lataling, Latiung, Pasir Tinggi, Pulau Bangkalak (Pulau Bengkalak), Seuneubok, Suak Lamatan, Trans Baru, Trans Jernge, Trans Meranti (Trans Maranti), Ulul Mayang (Manyang)
Simeulue Timur	Air Dingin, Air Pinang, Amaiteng Mulia, Ameria Bahagia, Ganting, Kota Batu, Kuala Makmur, Linggi, Lugu, Pulau Siumat, Sefoyan, Sinabang, Suak Buluh, Suka Jaya, Suka Karya, Suka Maju, Ujung Tinggi
Teupah Barat	Angkeo, Awe Kecil, Awe Seubal, Bunon, Inor, Laayon, Lantik, Laubang (Leubang), Leubang Hulu, Maudil, Naibos, Nancala, Pulau Teupah, Salur, Salur Lasengalu, Salur Latun, Silengas, Sital
Teupah Tengah	Abail, Batu-Batu, Busung Indah, Kahad (Kahat), Labuah, Lanting, Lasikin, Matanurung (Matan Urung), Nancawa, Simpang Abail, Situbuk, Sua-Sua
Simeulue Tengah	Dihit, Kampung Aie, Kuta Baru (Kuta Batu), Lakubang, Lamayang, Lambaya, Latitik, Lauree (Laure-e), Leuke (Lauke), Luan Sorip, Putra Jaya, Sebbe, Situfa Jaya, Suak Baru, Wel Wel, Wellang Kum (Wel Langkom)
Teluk Dalam	Babussalam, Bulu Hadik, Gunung Putih, Kuala Bakti, Kuala Baru, Luan Balu, Lugu Sek Bahak (Sebahak), Muara Aman, Sambai (Sambay), Tanjung Raya
Simeulue Cut	Amarabu, Borengan, Bubuhan, Kuta Inang, Kuta Padang, Latak Ayah, Sibuluh, Ujung Pandang / Padang
Salang	Along (Along Jaya), Bunga, Ganang Pusako, Jaya Baru, Karya Bakti, Kenangan Jaya, Lalla Bahagia, Meunafa (Meunafah), Mutiara, Nasreuhe, Padang Unoi, Panton Lawe, Suak Manang, Tameng, Tamon Jaya (Tamon), Ujung Salang
Simeulue Barat	Amabaan, Babul Makmur, Batu Ragi, Lamamek, Layabaung, Lhok Bikhau (Lhok Bikhao), Lhok Makmur, Malasin, Miteum, Sanggiran, Sembilan, Sigulai, Sinar Bahagia, Ujung Harapan
Alafan	Lafakha, Lamerem, Langi, Lewak, Lhok Dalam, Lhok Pauh (Lhok Paoh), Lubuk Baik, Serafon

== Demographics ==
The people of Simeulue are similar to the people in the neighboring Nias Island, speaking 3 languages (Devayan, Sigulai, and Leukon) which are distinctly different from the languages spoken in mainland Aceh. The vast majority (99.7% in 2020) of the people of Simeulue are Muslim.

== Sports ==
Simeulue Regency is represented by local football clubs Persikota Simeulue and PS Simeulue, both of which are based at the Simeulue Stadium and both compete in the Liga 4 Aceh.

== Earthquakes ==
Simeulue was close to the epicenter of the 9.3 magnitude 26 December 2004 earthquake, but loss of life was surprisingly low, mainly because the people are familiar with earthquakes and tsunamis in this seismically active region and so knew to leave the coast after the earthquake. A major earthquake and tsunami hit Simeulue in 1907, killing many of its inhabitants. Many died when they rushed to the beach after seeing the water recede, exposing the coral and fish. They went to collect the fish, not realizing that the water would come back. Those who survived told the story of the 1907 semong, the local word for tsunami, to their children. It is largely because of this oral history that many in Simeulue say that they knew what to do when the 26 December 2004 earthquake and tsunami struck. In the fishing village of Kariya Vhapi on the NW shore of Simuelue, the 26 December 2004 tsunami was approximately 2 m high when it went through the village completely destroying all buildings.

On 28 March 2005 an 8.7 magnitude stuck with its epicenter just off the south end of Simeulue Island. During the earthquake, Simeulue rose at least six feet on the western coast; this left the flat top of its coral reefs above high tide level leaving it dry and dead. On the east coast, the land was submerged, seawater flooding fields and settlements. At the village of Kariya Vhapi the 28 March 2005 tsunami was smaller than the one the previous December and did not damage the village; however it did overtop a 3.2 m high beach berm. In Sinabang the 28 March 2005 earthquake and subsequent fire destroyed 50 to 60 percent of the downtown area and significantly damaged the port facility. At Sinabang the uplift was less than further north being only 40 cm.

On 20 February 2008 at 03:08 PM local time, Simeulue suffered a 7.4 magnitude earthquake.

On 11 April 2012 at 04:38 PM local time, Simeulue suffered an 8.6 magnitude earthquake.

== Environment ==
Much of the north-western half of the island has been recognised as an Important Bird Area (IBA) by BirdLife International. It contains forested hills up to an elevation of 576 m, as well as two freshwater lakes. The Simeulue scops-owl is endemic to the island.
