= Neoserica heterophylla =

Scientific classification
- Kingdom: Animalia
- Phylum: Arthropoda
- Clade: Pancrustacea
- Class: Insecta
- Order: Coleoptera
- Suborder: Polyphaga
- Infraorder: Scarabaeiformia
- Family: Scarabaeidae
- Genus: Neoserica
- Species: N. heterophylla

Binomial name
- Neoserica heterophylla Moser, 1914

Species of beetle

Neoserica heterophylla is a species of beetle of the family Scarabaeidae. It is found in Indonesia (Simeulue).

== Description ==
Adults reach a length of about 10 mm. The frons is widely punctate and has several strong, erect setae next to the eyes. The pronotum is densely punctate and he punctures have tiny setae. The anterior margin of the pronotum is slightly projected in the middle and has several erect setae next to the anterior angles. Strong, erect bristles are present next to the lateral margins. On the elytra, the interspaces are scarcely convex and irregularly punctate, the punctures with minute setae. Isolated strong setae are present next to the lateral margins.
