= Jamee language =

Minangkabau dialect spoken on Sumatra, Indonesia

Jamee
- Bahaso Jamu
- Native to: Indonesia (Aceh)
- Region: Coastal areas of Aceh Singkil, South Aceh, Southwest Aceh, West Aceh and Simeulue
- Ethnicity: Aneuk Jamee
- Native speakers: (87,000 cited 1981)
- Language family: Austronesian: Malayo-Polynesian; disputed: Malayo-Sumbawan or Greater North Borneo; Malayic; Minangkabau; Jamee
- Dialects: Labuhanhaji; Meureubo; Samadua; Susoh; Tapaktuan
- Writing system: Latin (Indonesian alphabet); Jawi

Language codes
- ISO 639-3: –
- Glottolog: aneu1237
- Regencies and cities in Aceh where the Jamee language is spoken by a significant minority of the population

The Jamee language (Jamee: Bahaso Jamu, Acehnese: Bahsa/Basa Jamèe, lit. 'language of the guests'), also known as the Aneuk Jamee language (Acehnese: Bahsa/Basa Aneuk Jamèe pronounced [ba(h)ˈs̻̪a aˈnɯk ɟaˈmɛ(ə̯)]), is a dialect of the Minangkabau language that is predominantly spoken by the Aneuk Jamee people in Aceh, Indonesia, who are descendants of Minangkabau migrants who began migrating from present-day West Sumatra to Aceh in the 17th century, which over time have gradually assimilated into Acehnese society and culture. The Jamee language is primarily spoken along the southern and western coasts of Aceh, particularly in the coastal areas of South Aceh, Southwest Aceh, West Aceh, and Aceh Singkil Regency. Additionally, it is also spoken by Aneuk Jamee migrants in Simeulue and the nearby islands, following the migration of these communities from mainland Aceh to the island.

Today, most Aneuk Jamee people, particularly those residing in Acehnese-dominated areas like West Aceh Regency, are either bilingual or trilingual. In addition to their native tongue, they also commonly use Acehnese in their daily lives, alongside Indonesian. In contrast, in regions with a higher concentration of Aneuk Jamee populations, such as specific districts in South Aceh and Southwest Aceh Regencies, the Aneuk Jamee language is more widely used and remains an integral part of daily communication. The Jamee language has differed significantly from standard Minangkabau still spoken in West Sumatra, such as in Bukittinggi, in terms of phonology, lexicon, and morphology. Although Jamee is generally still considered a dialect of Minangkabau, it is no longer entirely the same language. Assimilation with local languages, such as Acehnese, has made the Jamee language diverged significantly from standard Minangkabau.

== Classification ==
The Jamee language is a dialect of the Minangkabau language, which is itself a Malayic language. Speakers of Malayic languages are spread from Brunei, Indonesia, Malaysia, Singapore, Southern Thailand, to the southernmost part of the Philippines. Malay is a member of the Austronesian family of languages, which includes languages from Taiwan, Southeast Asia, and the Pacific Ocean, with a smaller number in continental Asia. Malagasy, a geographic outlier spoken in Madagascar in the Indian Ocean, is also a member of this language family. Although these languages are not necessarily mutually intelligible to any extent, their similarities are often quite apparent. In more conservative languages like Malay, many roots have come with relatively little change from their common ancestor, Proto-Austronesian. There are many cognates found in the languages' words for kinship, health, body parts and common animals. Numbers, especially, show remarkable similarities.

The Jamee language originated from the Pariaman and Pasaman dialects of Minangkabau, brought to Aceh by migrants from these regions. While the Jamee language is considered as a dialect of Minangkabau, it has been extensively influenced by the Acehnese language, especially the northern dialects. The heavy influence of the Acehnese language has caused the Jamee language to diverge significantly from standard Minangkabau spoken in West Sumatra.The differences between the Jamee language and standard Minangkabau lie in certain aspects of phonology, morphology, and lexicon. In terms of sentence structure, however, the two language variant do not have significant differences.

== Geographical distribution and usage ==
The Jamee language is predominantly spoken along Aceh's southern coast, with smaller communities found along parts of the west coast. The Aneuk Jamee population is not concentrated in a single area but is dispersed across various districts in South Aceh Regency, including Labuhanhaji, Samadua, and Tapaktuan. In Aceh Singkil Regency, they are found in districts of Singkil, North Singkil, and Pulau Banyak. Additionally, in Southwest Aceh Regency, they inhabit areas such as Lembah Sabil, Manggeng, Susoh, and Jeumpa. They also reside in Johan Pahlawan, Kaway XVI, and Kuala districts in West Aceh Regency. Most Aneuk Jamee communities are located in small coves along the southern coast of Aceh, nestled within a series of bays situated in the lowlands flanked by the Bukit Barisan mountain range. The districts where the Aneuk Jamee reside are separated by areas inhabited by other ethnic groups, such as the Acehnese, Kluet, and other communities in South Aceh. The Jamee language is also spoken in Simeulue, particularly in the town of Sinabang, where it serves as a lingua franca for market transactions and trade activities.

In Southern Aceh, the Jamee language serves as the lingua franca among various ethnic groups, whereas in other regions of Aceh, this role is predominantly fulfilled by Acehnese. In Singkil, Aceh Singkil Regency, Jamee is commonly used as the language of instruction in schools and for informal communication between students and teachers. In contrast, Indonesian is used in more formal settings. Additionally, the Jamee language is also used as a media of communication between peers, as a medium of conversation in coffee shops, for discussing local government matters, and during sale and purchase transactions in town. In the Banyak Islands, located off the coast of Aceh Singkil, many locals—particularly younger generations—are gradually shifting from speaking Haloban, a dialect of the Simeulue language, to Jamee or Indonesian.

== Dialects ==
The Jamee language comprises several dialects, with the most prominent being Labuhanhaji, Meureubo, Samadua, Susoh, and Tapaktuan. Each of these dialects also includes sub-dialects, which may vary from one another. Additionally, different districts often have distinct dialects, reflecting the linguistic diversity within the region. The differences between these dialects may lie in their phonology, morphology, and lexicons; however, they remain mutually intelligible. For example, the Tapaktuan dialect tends to use the vowel sound "a" at the end of words or sentences, and the pronunciation of the consonant "r" in the Tapaktuan dialect is concise. On the other hand, in the Samadua dialect, the consonant "r" is replaced with "gh", and there is greater use of the vowel sound "o" in spoken words or sentences. The dialects of Tapaktuan and Samadua are notably distinct from other Jamee dialects. These two are more traditional and retain greater similarities to the Minangkabau dialects spoken in West Sumatra. Additionally, the Tapaktuan dialect is more influenced by Indonesian, as Tapaktuan is the capital of South Aceh Regency, where local government offices are located and Indonesian is commonly used in administration. The differences are not only in pronunciation but also in vocabulary, sentence structure, and intonation. The Susoh dialect spoken in South Aceh and the Meureubo dialect spoken in West Aceh share many similarities in pronunciation, vocabulary, and intonation. They are more influenced by Acehnese compared to the other dialects, to the extent that the Jamee dialects spoken in these two districts can be considered as a mixture of Minangkabau and Acehnese. Another dialect is the Labuhanhaji dialect which is used in South Aceh, especially in Hulu Pisang village.

== Phonology ==
Like many other regional languages in Indonesia, the Jamee language lacks a standardized phonological system. However, some elements of its phonological system are loosely influenced by standard Indonesian orthography, particularly the system developed by the Indonesian Ministry of Education and Culture.

=== Vowels ===
The Jamee language features a total of seven vowels, setting it apart from standard Minangkabau, which has only five. The vowels in Jamee are /a/, /e/, /i/, /o/, /u/, /ɛ/, and /ɔ/.

| | Front | Central | Back |
|---|---|---|---|
| Close | i | | u |
| Close-mid | e | | o |
| Open-mid | ɛ | | ɔ |
| Open | | a | |

Notes:

In writing, the following phonemes are represented as thus:

- /ɛ/ is ⟨e⟩ or ⟨è⟩
- /ɔ/ is ⟨o⟩

=== Consonants ===
The Jamee language has 19 consonants, similar to standard Minangkabau. However, the phoneme /r/ is absent in the Jamee language, while the phoneme /ɣ/, present in Jamee, is absent in standard Minangkabau.

| | | Labial | Alveolar | Palatal | Velar | Glottal |
|---|---|---|---|---|---|---|
| Nasal | | m | n | ɲ | ŋ | |
| Plosive/ Affricate | voiceless | p | t | t͡ʃ | k | ʔ |
| Plosive/ Affricate | voiced | b | d | d͡ʒ | ɡ | |
| Fricative | | | s | | ɣ | h |
| Lateral | | | l | | | |
| Rhotic | | | | | | |
| Semivowel | | w | | j | | |

Notes:

In writing, the following phonemes are represented as thus:

- /ŋ/ is ⟨ng⟩
- /ɲ/ is ⟨ny⟩
- /t͡ʃ/ is ⟨c⟩
- /d͡ʒ/ is ⟨j⟩
- /ʔ/ is ⟨k⟩
- /j/ is ⟨y⟩
- /ɣ/ is ⟨r⟩

=== Diphthongs ===
Diphthongs, or compound vowels, in the Jamee language include the following: /ai/, /ia/, /ie/, /ua/, /ui/, /ue/, and /eè/. A defining characteristic of diphthongs is that their pronunciation involves a shift in tongue position, differing between the starting and ending sounds. These differences are influenced by the tongue's height, the part of the tongue that moves, and the overall tongue structure. In the Jamee language, diphthongs can be categorized into three types: rising diphthongs, falling diphthongs, and centering diphthongs. Rising diphthongs include /ai/, falling diphthongs consist of /ia/, /ie/, /ua/, /ue/, and /eè/, and centering diphthongs include /ui/. Examples of these diphthongs in use are shown below:

- /ai/: salasai 'finish'
- /ia/: ambiak 'to take'
- /ie/: caliek 'to see'
- /ua/: jatuah 'to fall'
- /ue/: tidue 'to sleep'
- /eè/: enteèng 'light'
- /ui/: lauik 'sea'

== Grammar ==
Along with Minangkabau, Indonesian, Malay, and other related languages, the word order in the Jamee language is typically subject-verb-object (SVO). While there are notable exceptions, the grammar structure of the Jamee language shares many similarities with Indonesian and Malay.

=== Affixes ===
In the Jamee language, there are four types of affixes: prefixes, suffixes, infixes, and circumfix. As is commonly found in languages across Indonesia, in the Jamee language, prefixes are attached at the beginning of a word, infixes are inserted between the consonant and the vowel of the first syllable of the root word, and suffixes are added at the end of the root word. Meanwhile, confixes, which are a combination of a prefix and a suffix forming a unified whole, are attached at both the beginning and the end of the root word.

==== Prefixes ====
Examples of prefixes in the Jamee language are ba-, di-, ka-, ma-, pa-, sa-, and ta-.

The prefix ba- has two allomorphs: ba- and bar-. The form ba- is used with root words that begin with a consonant, while the form bar- is used with root words that begin with a vowel. The prefix ba- can be attached to verbs, nouns, adjectives, and numerals. The prefix ba- conveys different meanings depending on the type of word it is attached to. When combined with verbs, it signifies performing an action on oneself or engaging in an activity. With nouns, it indicates actions such as working on or managing something, possessing or owning, using or utilizing, or producing or creating. When used with adjectives, it expresses being in a particular state or condition. Lastly, when attached to numerals, it denotes the idea of forming or representing a collective group. Examples of its usage are shown below:

- ba- + latieh 'train' → balatieh 'to train oneself'
- ba- + dama 'peace' → badama 'to make peace'
- ba- + paneh 'hot' → bapaneh 'to be in a hot condition'
- ba- + limo 'five' → balimo 'to be in a group of five'

The prefix di- has no allomorphs. It is used to indicate the passive voice and is only attached to verbs. Examples of its usage are shown below:

- di- + karajo 'work' → dikarajoken 'to be done'
- di- + tulie 'write' → ditulie 'to be written'
- di- + angkek 'carry' → diangkek 'to be carried'
- di- + kaja 'chase' → diakaja 'to be chased'

The prefix ka- has no allomorphs. It can be combined with adjectives and numerals. When attached to adjectives, ka- conveys the meaning of "indicating that which is ... ." When combined with numerals, ka- implies the meaning of "indicating a level or group." Examples of its usage are shown below:

- ka- + tuo 'old' → katuo 'head/chief'
- ka- + kasieh 'give' → kakasieh 'lover'
- ka- + duo 'two' → kaduo 'second'
- ka- + ampek 'four' → kaampek 'fourth'

The prefix ma- always carries a nasal sound, leading to several allomorphs: ma-, mam-, man-, many-, and mang-. These variations are determined by the initial sound of the root word. The form ma- becomes mam- when the root begins with the consonants /b/ or /p/, and man- when the root starts with /t/ or /d/. It changes to many- when the root begins with /s/. Additionally, ma- transforms into mang- if the root starts with the consonants /k/, /g/, /h/, or a vowel (/a/, /i/, /u/, /e/). The prefix ma- can be attached to nouns, verbs, adjectives, and numerals, each conveying different meanings depending on the type of root word. When combined with nouns, ma- can express meanings such as acting like or becoming like something, moving toward a direction, creating or making something referred to by the root word, using something, or adding to or supplying something. When attached to verbs, ma- conveys the meaning of performing an action or engaging in an activity. With adjectives, it signifies the meaning of becoming a certain state. Lastly, when combined with numerals, ma- implies the meaning of becoming or forming something related to the number. Examples of its usage are shown below:

- ma- + batu 'stone' → mambatu 'freeze like a stone'
- ma- + lompek 'jump' → malompek 'to jump'
- ma- + dakek 'close' → mandakek 'to get closer'
- ma- + satu 'one' → manyatu 'to become one'

The prefix pa- always carries a nasal sound, resulting in several allomorphs: /pa-/, /paR-/, /pam-/, /pan-/, /pany-/, and /pang-/. The form pa- changes to pam- when the root word begins with the consonants /b/ or /p/. It becomes pany- when the root starts with the consonant /s/. The form pa- changes to pan- when the root begins with the consonants /t/, /d/, or /c/. Finally, pa- changes to pang- when the root starts with the consonants /k/, /g/, /h/, or a vowel (/a/, /i/, /u/, /e/). Additionally, pa- may change to paR- when the root begins with a vowel, depending on the function and context. The prefix pa- can be attached to nouns, verbs, adjectives, and numerals, each carrying different meanings. When attached to nouns, pa- signifies a tool or instrument, a person who works at a certain place, or the meaning of making or considering something as such. When combined with verbs, pa- indicates the performer of an action or someone who is fond of doing something. With adjectives, pa- conveys the meaning of having the characteristic mentioned in the root word, functioning as a tool, or making or enhancing something. When attached to numerals, pa- implies the meaning of "making into" or "becoming." Examples of its usage are shown below:

- pa- + sapu 'broom' → panyapu 'sweeper'
- pa- + budak 'slave' → pabudak 'to enslave'
- pa- + ketek 'small' → paketek 'to smallen'
- pa- + nyanyi 'sing' → panyanyi 'singer'

The prefix sa- has no allomorphs and can be attached to nouns, adjectives, and numerals. When attached to nouns, sa- conveys the meaning of "one" or "a group." When combined with adjectives, sa- often means "similar to" or "the same as." When attached to numerals, it conveys the meaning of "one." Additionally, sa- is frequently used with the suffix -no, and the base word may be used for reduplication. Examples of its usage are shown below:

- sa- + rupo 'appearance' → sarupo 'identical'
- sa- + tenggi 'tall' → satenggi 'as tall as'
- sa- + pande 'smart' → sapande 'as smart as'
- sa- + ratus 'hundred' → saratus 'a hundred'

The prefix ta- has two allomorphs: ta- and taR-. When attached to a root that begins with a consonant, it remains ta-, but when attached to a root that starts with a vowel, it changes to taR-. The prefix ta- can be combined with verbs and adjectives. When attached to verbs, ta- conveys meanings such as "able" or "capable," or it can indicate that an action is performed unintentionally or refers to a state. When attached to adjectives, ta- expresses the superlative degree, indicating the highest level or most intense quality of the characteristic described by the root. Examples of its usage are shown below:

- ta- + bali 'buy' → tabali 'to get bought'
- ta- + lalok 'sleep' → talalok 'to fall asleep'
- ta- + latak 'position' → talatak 'to be positioned'
- ta- + randeh 'low' → tarandeh 'lowest'

==== Infixes ====
The use of infixes in the Jamee language is highly limited and is likely influenced by Indonesian. Some examples of infixes in the Jamee language are -am-, -al- and -ar-. The use of infixes is to indicate quantity, frequency or intensity, or to express characteristics as stated in the root form. Examples of its usage are shown below:

- gunung 'mountain' + -am- → gamunung 'mountains'
- gigi 'tooth' + -ar- → gerigi 'serrated'
- gatar 'to shake' + -al- → galatar 'to tremble'
- gilang 'bright' + -am- → gamilang 'brilliant'

==== Suffixes ====
Examples of suffixes in the Jamee language are -en, -i, -ken, -nyo and -se.

The suffix -en can be attached to nouns, verbs, adjectives, and numerals, each carrying different meanings based on the type of root word. In the Tapaktuan dialect, -an is used, influenced by Indonesian. When combined with nouns, -en conveys the sense of a group or collection, or it indicates the result or outcome of an action. When attached to verbs, it can signify a tool or instrument, or it may also denote the result or consequence of an action. With adjectives, -en implies possessing a quality or characteristic described by the base word. Lastly, when attached to numerals, -en suggests the idea of a group or collection associated with the number. Examples of its usage are shown below:

- gambar 'picture' + -en → gambaran 'depiction'
- kurueng 'to confine' + -en → kuruengen 'cage'
- tulis 'to write' + -en → tulisen 'writing'
- pulueh 'ten' + -en → puluehen 'tens'

The suffix -i can be affixed to nouns, verbs, and adjectives. When attached to nouns, it denotes the act of giving something described by the base word. When combined with verbs, it indicates performing an action repeatedly. When joined with adjectives, it signifies causing something to acquire the quality expressed by the base word. Examples of its usage are shown below:

- ubek 'medicine' + -i → ubeki 'to give medicine'
- kantong 'pocket' + -i → kantongi 'to put something into a pocket'
- tanom 'to plant' + -i → tanomi 'to plant repeatedly'
- hitom 'black' + -i → hitomi 'to blacken'

The suffix -ken can be attached to nouns, verbs, and adjectives. The Tapaktuan dialect uses -kan, while communities outside Tapaktuan predominantly use -ken much more frequently than -kan, influenced by the suffix -kan in Indonesian. The meaning of the suffix -ken is causative. Examples of its usage are shown below:

- aie 'water'+ -ken → aieken 'to water'
- buka 'open'+ -ken → bukaken 'to open'
- kunci 'key'+ -ken → kunciken 'to lock'
- jalo 'net'+ -ken → jaloken 'to catch using net'

The suffix -nyo in the Jamee language has no allomorphs. This suffix can be attached to nouns, verbs, and adjectives. The suffix -nyo serves to clarify the word it precedes, emphasize what is mentioned in the base word, or describe a situation. Examples of its usage are shown below:

- rumah 'house'+ -nyo → rumahnyo 'his/her house'
- kecek 'to talk'+ -nyo → keceknya 'what he/she said'
- sirah 'red'+ -nyo → sirahnyo 'very red'
- lari 'to run'+ -nyo → larinyo 'his/her run'

The suffix -se in the Jamee language is equivalent to the particle -lah in Indonesian. This suffix has no allomorphs and can only be attached to verbs. The suffix -se serves to emphasize and reinforce the meaning of the base word. Examples of its usage are shown below:

- mandi 'to shower' + -se → mandise 'go take a shower'
- siko 'here' + -se → sikose 'come here'
- tidue 'to sleep' + -se → tiduese 'go sleep'
- pacek 'to hold' + -se → pacekse 'hold it'

==== Circumfixes ====
In the Jamee language, there are two circumfixes: ka-...-en and pa-...-en.

The circumfix ka-...-en has no allomorphs and can only be attached to adjectives. This circumfix conveys meanings such as describing an event that has occurred, experiencing something, indicating an excessive degree, or possessing characteristics similar to those expressed by the base word. Examples of its usage are shown below:

- ka- + manis 'sweet' + -en → kemanisen 'too sweet'
- ka- + wajib 'obligatory' + -en → kewajiben 'oorabligation'
- ka- + kurang 'lack' + -en → kekurangen 'lackness'
- ka- + malu 'shame' + -en → kekurangen 'very embarrassed'

The circumfix pa-...-en in the Jamee language has two allomorphs: pa-...-en and paR-...-en. The first is used when attached to a base word that begins with a consonant, while the second is used with a base word that begins with a vowel. This circumfix can only be attached to verbs. It conveys meanings such as indicating a place, the result of an action, or the event or action itself. Examples of its usage are shown below:

- pa- + adil 'fair' + -en → pangadilen 'court'
- pa- + nulak 'to reject' + -en → panulaken 'rejection'
- pa- + tusuk 'to stab' + -en → panusuaken 'stabbing'
- pa- + palsu 'fake' + -en → pemalsuen 'forgery'

=== Reduplication ===
In the Jamee language, three types of reduplication are found: full reduplication, which involves repeating the entire base word without adding other elements; full reduplication with phoneme variation in one of its components; and reduplication with affixation, which combines reduplication with affixes. The meanings that can be conveyed by reduplication in the Jamee language include indicating plurality or variety, resemblance, intensity, an indefinite quantity, mutual action, or a collective sense. Examples of reduplications are:

- sayur 'vegetable' → sayur-sayuren 'assortments of vegetables'
- buku 'book' → buku-buku 'many books'
- anak 'child' → anak-anaken 'acting childish'
- orang 'person' → orang-orangen 'resembling a person'
- gadang 'big' → gadang-gadang 'very big'
- ayom 'chicken' → ayom-ayom 'many chickens'
- tariek 'to pull' → tariek-manariek 'to pull one another'
- tigo 'three' → tigo-tigo 'three of them'

=== Nouns ===
In the Jamee language, nouns can be followed by other nouns, verbs, adjectives, or prepositions. Noun phrase can also consist of two nouns connected by a conjunction. Examples of nouns are shown below:

- aie tabu 'sugarcane juice'
- ayah amo umak 'dad and mom'
- lauek panggang 'grilled fish'
- urang gapuek 'fat person'
- unggeh dalam sangkak 'bird inside a cage'

=== Verbs ===
Verbs can be followed by other verbs, nouns, numerals, adverbs and prepositions. Examples of verbs and its usage are shown below:

- mangumpeken kepieng 'to collect money'
- pai mangai 'to go fishing'
- ambiek sabuah 'take one'
- liek sabanta 'look briefly'
- tabang ke langiek 'fly to the sky'

=== Adjectives ===
Adjectives can be followed by other adjectives, adverbs and prepositions. An adjectival phrase can also consist of two adjectives connected by a conjunction. Examples of adjectives and its usage are shown below:

- kayo miskien 'rich poor'
- manieh dan asien 'sweet and salty'
- jaueh sakiek 'slightly far'
- sira di dalom 'red on the inside'

=== Adverbs ===
An adverb indicating time can be followed by a demonstrative pronoun. It can also be followed by another adverb. Examples of adverbs and its usage are shown below:

- kini ko 'right now'
- patang ko 'this evening'
- isuek pagi 'tomorrow morning'
- pagi kalamerien 'yesterday morning'

=== Numerals ===
Numeral can be followed by another numerals, which may also be connected by a conjunction. Examples of numerals and its usage are shown below:

- saiko duo iko 'one two animals'
- ciek duo 'one two'
- ampek ngen limo 'four and five'
- limo ngen anam 'five and six'

=== Prepositions ===
Prepositions can be followed by verbs, personal pronouns, adverbs, or nouns. Examples of prepositions and its usage are shown below:

- alah tibo 'has arrived'
- untuek ambo 'for me'
- hinggo pagi 'until morning'
- di lauik at the sea'

== Vocabulary ==
Much of the vocabulary in the Jamee language is derived from Minangkabau. However, it has also incorporated loanwords from other languages, such as Acehnese and Indonesian. Additionally, there are slight variations in the vocabulary of different Jamee dialects, although these dialects generally remain mutually intelligible. The table below provides examples of common Jamee vocabulary used on a daily basis along with their standard Minangkabau, Indonesian, and English translations.

=== Numerals ===
| Number | Jamee | Standard Minangkabau | Indonesian | English |
|---|---|---|---|---|
| 1 | satu | ciek, satu, aso | satu | one |
| 2 | duo | duo | dua | two |
| 3 | tigo | tigo | tiga | three |
| 4 | ampek | ampek | empat | four |
| 5 | limo | limo | lima | five |
| 6 | anom | anam | enam | six |
| 7 | tujueh | tujuah | tujuh | seven |
| 8 | lapen | lapan | delapan | eight |
| 9 | sambilen | sambilan | sembilan | nine |
| 10 | sapulueh | sapuluah | sepuluh | ten |
| 11 | sabaleh | sabaleh | sebelas | eleven |
| 15 | limo baleh | limo baleh | lima belas | fifteen |
| 50 | limo pulueh | limo puluah | lima puluh | fifty |
| 100 | saratuih | saratuih | seratus | one hundred |
| 150 | saratuih limo pulueh | saratuih limo puluah | seratus lima puluh | one hundred and fifty |
| 500 | limo ratuih | limo ratuih | lima ratus | five hundred |
| 1000 | saribu | saribu | seribu | one thousand |

=== Directions ===
| Jamee | Standard Minangkabau | Indonesian | English |
|---|---|---|---|
| iko | iko | ini | this |
| itu | itu | itu | that |
| siko | siko | sini | here |
| sinin | sinan | sana | there |
| disiko | disiko | di sini | over here |
| disinin | disinan | di sana | over there |
| salatan | salatan | selatan | south |
| utara | utaro | utara | north |
| barat | barat, baraik | barat | west |
| timur | timur, timo, timua | timur | east |

=== Personal Pronouns ===
| Jamee | Standard Minangkabau | Indonesian | English |
|---|---|---|---|
| ambo | ambo, awak, aden | aku, saya | I, me |
| waang, kau | ang, waang, awak, kau | kamu, engkau | you (singular) |
| kalien | kalian | kalian | you (prural) |
| inyo | inyo, wakno, ano | dia | he/she |
| kami. kito | awak, kami, kito | kita | we |
| waknyo | urang-urang, urang tu | mereka | they |

=== Interrogatives Pronouns ===
| Jamee | Standard Minangkabau | Indonesian | English |
|---|---|---|---|
| apo | a, apo | apa | what |
| sia | sia, siapo | siapa | who |
| monga | mangapo, manga, dek a | mengapa | why |
| dima | dimano, dima | dimana | where |
| bagaimano | bagaimano, ba a | bagaimana | how |
| pabilo | bilo | kapan | when |

=== Nouns ===
| Jamee | Standard Minangkabau | Indonesian | English |
|---|---|---|---|
| laki | lalaki | laki-laki | man |
| padusi | padusi | perempuan | woman |
| urang | urang, ughang | orang | people |
| lauek | ikan, lauak | ikan | fish |
| moto | oto | mobil | car |
| gunung | gunuang | gunung | mountain |
| palak | kabun, ladang, parak | kebun | field |
| iko | ikua | ekor | tail |
| tanah | tanah | tanah | land, ground |
| mato | mato | mata | eye |
| bulen | bulan | bulan | month, moon |
| bungo | bungo | bunga | flower |
| kecek | muluik, muncuang | mulut | mouth |
| gigiek | gigi | gigi | tooth |
| pauik | paruik | perut | stomach, tummy |
| kucieng | kuciang | kucing | cat |
| lauit | lauik | laut | sea |
| buah | buah | buah | fruit |
| angin | angin | angin | wind |
| kasik | pasia, kasiak, bungin | pasir | sand |
| batu | batu | batu | stone |
| aie | aie, aia | air | water |
| duik | uang, pitih, kepeang | uang, duit | money |
| camin | camin | cermin | mirror |
| asok | asok | asap | smoke |
| ujen | ujan | hujan | rain |

=== Verbs ===
| Jamee | Standard Minangkabau | Indonesian | English |
|---|---|---|---|
| minum | minum/minun | minum | drink |
| maken | makan,sungkah | makan | eat |
| liek | liek,caliak | lihat | see |
| maien | main | main | play |
| jatuah | jatuah | jatuh | to fall |
| tidue, lalok | tidua, lalok | tidur | sleep |
| duduek | duduak | duduk | sit |
| tagak | tagak, badiri | berdiri | stand |
| baco | baco | baca | read |
| bajalen | bajalan | berjalan | walk |
| manulie | manulih | menulis | to write |
| basueh | basuah, cuci, nyasah | cuci | wash |
| datang, tibo | datang, tibo | datang, tiba | arrive |
| galawo | lempa,bae,hembek | lempar | to throw |
| mamukue | mamukua, malantuang, manokok, mangguguah | memukul | to punch |
| gigiek | gigik | gigit | to bite |
| tariek | elo/egang/junjuang | tarik | pull |
| mangaie | mangaia/manciang | memancing | fishing |
| mamanjek | mamanjek | memanjat | to climb |
| mambali | mambali | membeli | to buy |
| manangie | manangih | menangis | to cry |
| imbo | imbau/panggia | panggil | call |

=== Adjectives ===
| Jamee | Standard Minangkabau | Indonesian | English |
|---|---|---|---|
| barue | baru | baru | new |
| lamo | lamo | lama | old |
| dingien, sajuek | dingin, sajuak | dingin, sejuk | cold |
| paneh, angek | paneh, angek | panas | hot |
| gadang | gadang, basa | besar | large |
| tenggi | tinggi | tinggi | tall |
| randeh | randah | rendah | short |
| panjang | panjang | panjang | long |
| rancak | rancak, manih, kamek | cantik | pretty |
| sakiek | sakik | sakit | sick |
| lueh | laweh | luas | wide |
| lamak | lamak | sedap, enak | delicious |
| masik | kariang, masiak | kering | dry |
| haluih | halui | halus | soft |
| banyak | banyak, rami | banyak | many |
| meuhob | berang, rabo | marah | angry |
| masik | kariang | kering | dry |
| awai | capek, ligaik | cepat | fast |
| manieh | manih, kamek | manis | sweet |
| pande | pandai, cadiak, santiang | pandai | smart |

== See also ==
- Minangkabau people
- Pesisir language

== Bibliography ==
- Abdullah, Wamad; Marlian, Syamsuar; Rohana, Sitti; Gade, M. Hasan (1990). Morfologi dan Sintaksis Bahasa Jamee [Morphology and Syntax of the Jamee Language] (PDF) (in Indonesian). Jakarta: Language Development and Cultivation Center, Department of Education and Culture. ISBN 979-459-078-9.
- Abdullah, Wamad; Marlian, Syamsuar; Rohana, Sitti; Usman, Bustami (1991). Struktur Bahasa Jamee [Structure of the Jamee Language] (PDF) (in Indonesian). Jakarta: Language Development and Cultivation Center, Department of Education and Culture. ISBN 979-459-178-5.
- Yusuf, Husni; Mahmud, Saifuddin; Ali, Zaini; Ibrahim, Ridwan (1998). Tata Bahasa Jamee [Grammar of the Jamee Language] (PDF) (in Indonesian). Jakarta: Language Development and Cultivation Center, Department of Education and Culture. ISBN 979-459-819-4.
