= Pesisir language =

Language

Pesisir
- Baiko
- Bahaso Pasisi
- Native to: Indonesia (North Sumatra)
- Region: Sibolga, Central Tapanuli and the coastal areas of South Tapanuli and Mandailing Natal
- Ethnicity: Pesisir
- Native speakers: 84,444 (2010)
- Language family: Austronesian: Malayo-Polynesian; disputed: Malayo-Sumbawan or Greater North Borneo; Malayic; Minangkabau; Pesisir
- Dialects: Barus; Sibolga; Singkuang; Sorkam
- Writing system: Latin (Indonesian alphabet)

Language codes
- ISO 639-3: –
- Glottolog: None
- Regencies and cities in North Sumatra where Pesisir is spoken by the majority of the population Regencies and cities in North Sumatra where Pesisir is spoken by a significant minority of the population

The Pesisir language (Pesisir: Bahaso Pasisi, Indonesian: Bahasa Pesisir, lit. 'coastal language'), also known as Baiko (Pesisir: Bahaso Baiko), is a dialect of the Minangkabau language spoken by the Pesisir people in North Sumatra, Indonesia. The Pesisir people are descendants of the Minangkabau who migrated to Tapanuli from present-day West Sumatra in the 14th century and intermingled with other ethnic groups, including the Bataks and Acehnese. The Pesisir people reside in Central Tapanuli, Sibolga, the coastal areas of South Tapanuli, and Mandailing Natal, along the western coastline of North Sumatra. The history of this language began with the arrival of Minangkabau migrants from Pariaman in West Sumatra, who came to trade along the northern west coast of Sumatra. These migrants then made contact with other ethnic groups, resulting in a linguistic acculturation with both languages. As a result, the Pesisir language shares similarities with the Pariaman dialect of Minangkabau and has also been influenced by the Batak languages.

The Pesisir language of Sibolga serves as a lingua franca for the people of Sibolga and Central Tapanuli. The Pesisir language is used as a means of communication. In daily interactions, the Pesisir language plays an important role. This role can be seen in many aspects of their lives, such as activities in the market, greetings, working on the beach and at sea, visiting, joking, and playing. The use of the language in these aspects is not limited to certain groups but encompasses all members of society, from children to the elderly.

== Classification ==
The Pesisir language is a Malayic language. Speakers of Malayic languages are spread from Brunei, Indonesia, Malaysia, Singapore, Southern Thailand, to the southernmost part of the Philippines. Malay is a member of the Austronesian family of languages, which includes languages from Taiwan, Southeast Asia, and the Pacific Ocean, with a smaller number in continental Asia. Malagasy, a geographic outlier spoken in Madagascar in the Indian Ocean, is also a member of this language family. Although these languages are not necessarily mutually intelligible to any extent, their similarities are often quite apparent. In more conservative languages like Malay, many roots have come with relatively little change from their common ancestor, Proto-Austronesian. There are many cognates found in the languages' words for kinship, health, body parts and common animals. Numbers, especially, show remarkable similarities.

The Pesisir language closely resembles the Minangkabau language, particularly the Pariaman dialect. Lexically, it shares about 70% to 80% of its vocabulary with standard Minangkabau, while only about 20% with Batak Toba. Research suggests that Pesisir and Minangkabau were once the same language but began to diverge around the 14th century. Over time, the Pesisir language has developed its own distinct features, influenced by interactions with other local languages such as Batak and Acehnese. While most of the vocabularies in the Pesisir language are derived from standard Minangkabau, the intonation, rhythm, and stress of the language are more closely aligned with the Batak languages. Nevertheless, due to these linguistic similarities, most studies still classify the Pesisir language as a dialect of Minangkabau, though some also consider it a dialect of Batak or Malay.

== Geographical distribution and usage ==
The Pesisir language is predominantly spoken by the Pesisir people along the western coast of North Sumatra, particularly in Central Tapanuli, Sibolga, and the coastal areas of South Tapanuli and Mandailing Natal. Its geographical range overlaps with that of the Toba Batak, and Mandailing languages, which are also widely spoken in these regions. In Sibolga, the Pesisir language is more commonly used by the residents of South Sibolga and Sibolga Sambas. In these areas, the majority of the population consists of fishermen who use the Pesisir language in their daily lives. Meanwhile, in North Sibolga, Batak is more predominantly spoken. In Sibolga Kota, both languages are generally used, although Indonesian is more commonly spoken. However, in general, the people of Sibolga are usually able to speak both the Pesisir language and Batak, in addition to Indonesian. Meanwhile, in Barus, Central Tapanuli, it is common for locals to code-switch between the Pesisir, Toba Batak, and Indonesian in the marketplace, adjusting to the language spoken by their customers.

In Sibolga and the surrounding areas, the Pesisir language holds a vital role in everyday social interactions, evident across numerous aspects of community life. This widespread use reflects the language's importance in maintaining social cohesion and cultural identity within the Pesisir community. Most Pesisir people are bilingual, fluent in both the Pesisir and Indonesian. In some areas, young students—typically up to grade three—are also taught in the local language. However, Indonesian remains the primary medium of instruction in education and is widely used for official matters. In Sibolga, no schools currently use the Pesisir language as a medium of instruction, whether in spoken or written form. The lack of educational materials, such as books and other learning resources in the Pesisir language, is a significant barrier. This situation is closely linked to the limited number of teachers and students proficient in the Pesisir language.

There are no official statistics on the number of dialects in the Pesisir language. However, studies suggest the existence of four distinct dialects: Barus, Sibolga, Singkuang, and Sorkam. The differences between these dialects primarily lie in their phonology, while their grammar and lexicon remain largely identical. For example, the word head is pronounced as kapalo in the Barus and Sibolga dialects, whereas in the Singkuang dialect, it is pronounced as kepalo. The Sibolga dialect is widely regarded as the prestige variety of the Pesisir language due to its extensive documentation, frequent use in formal settings, and active promotion in both academic and cultural contexts.

== Phonology ==
Like many other regional languages in Indonesia, the Pesisir language lacks a standardized phonological system. However, some of the phonological system designed for the Pesisir language is loosely inspired by standard Minangkabau phonology used in West Sumatra, which itself is influenced by standard Indonesian orthography.

=== Vowels ===
Like standard Minangkabau, the Pesisir language features only five vowels: /a, e, i, o, u/. The key distinction is that the vowel /a/ is an open-central vowel in standard Minangkabau, whereas it is an open-front vowel in the Pesisir language.

	Front	Central	Back
Close	i		u
Mid	e		o
Open	a		

=== Consonants ===
The Pesisir language has 19 different consonants, similar to standard Minangkabau.

		Labial	Alveolar	Palatal	Velar	Glottal
Nasal		m	n	ɲ	ŋ	
Plosive/ Affricate	voiceless	p	t	t͡ʃ	k	ʔ
Plosive/ Affricate	voiced	b	d	d͡ʒ	ɡ	
Fricative			s			h
Lateral			l			
Rhotic			r			
Semivowel		w		j		

Notes:

In writing, the following phonemes are represented as thus:

- /ŋ/ is ⟨ng⟩
- /ɲ/ is ⟨ny⟩
- /t͡ʃ/ is ⟨c⟩
- /d͡ʒ/ is ⟨j⟩
- /ʔ/ is ⟨k⟩
- /j/ is ⟨y⟩

=== Diphthongs ===
The Pesisir language features twelve diphthongs, typically found at the end of words: /ai̯/, /au̯/, /ae̯/, /iu̯/, /ia̯/, /uo̯/, /ua̯/, /ei̯/, /io̯/, /eo̯/, /ie̯/ and /ui̯/. Examples of these diphthongs in use are shown below:

- /ai̯/: /lai̯/ 'sail'
- /au̯/: /pau̯/ 'mango'
- /ae̯/: /gae̯k/ 'old'
- /iu̯/: /maliu̯k/ 'to curve'
- /ia̯/: /sia̯po/ 'who'
- /uo̯/: /juo̯/ 'also'
- /ua̯/:/alua̯n/ 'direction'
- /ei̯/: /badarei̯/ 'to laugh out loud'
- /io̯/: /satio̯/ 'every'
- /eo̯/: /maleo̯leo̯/ 'to sweep a woman's long hair'
- /ie̯/: /malie̯k/ 'to see'
- /ui̯/: /putui̯/ 'detach'

== Grammar ==
Like many other languages in Indonesia, the Pesisir language exhibits agglutinative characteristics, forming words through linear sequences of morphemes. Its sentence structure generally follows a subject-verb-object (SVO) order, a pattern commonly observed in many Indonesian languages. While there are some notable exceptions, the grammar structure of the Pesisir language shares many similarities with Indonesian and Malay.

=== Affixes ===
There are three types of affixes in the Pesisir language, namely prefixes, suffixes, and circumfixes. Prefixes are added to the beginning of a word, suffixes to the end, and confixes combine elements at both the beginning and end.

==== Prefixes ====
Example of prefixes commonly found in the Pesisir language are ma-, pa-, ta-, di-, ba-, and sa-.

The prefix ma- has five forms: ma-, man-, mang-, mam-, and many-. The function of the prefix ma- is to activate verbs in declarative sentences or to transform nouns into verbs. The meaning of the prefix ma- is "to perform an action" or "to perform an action using a tool." For example:

- ma- + nangi 'cry' → manangi 'to cry'
- ma- + nyimak 'observe' → manyimak 'to observe'
- ma- + sapu 'broom' → manyapu 'to sweep'
- ma- + jaring 'net' → manjaring 'to catch with a net'

The prefix ba- has two forms: ba- and bar-. The function of the prefix ba- is to transform nouns into verbs, make verbs intransitive, or modify numeral types. The meaning of the prefix ba- includes "to have," "to perform an action," "to use a title or form of address," or "to indicate unity (togetherness)." For example:

- ba- + panyakkik 'sickness' → bapanyakkik 'to have sickness'
- ba- + cakkak 'quarrel' → bacakkak 'to quarrel'
- ba- + judi 'gambling' → bajudi 'to gamble'
- ba- + limo 'five' → balimo 'to be in a group of fives'

The prefix pa- has the forms pa-, pan-, pam-, pang-, and pany-. The function of the prefix pa- is to transform verbs into nouns or to modify the type of noun. The meaning of the prefix pa- is to indicate "having a characteristic," to refer to "a person who (likes to) perform an action," to describe "a person who performs an action using something," or to refer to "a person whose job is related to or involves taking something." For example:

- pa- + cilo 'rob' → pacilo 'robber'
- pa- + minum 'drink' → paminum 'drinker'
- pa- + gigik 'bite' → pangigik 'biter'
- pa- + lawik 'sea' → palawik 'sea man'

The prefix ta- has two forms: ta- and tar-. The function of the prefix ta- is to make verbs passive, modify the meaning of intransitive verbs, or indicate adjectives. The meaning of the prefix ta- conveys "can" or "inadvertently," performing an action unconsciously or involuntarily, or "the most." For example:

- ta- + makkan 'eat' → tamakkan 'to be eaten by accident'
- ta- + cari 'find' → tacari 'can be found'
- ta- + tenggi 'high' → tatenggi 'highest'
- ta- + lamo 'long (time)' → talamo 'longest (time)'

The prefix di- has only one form: di-. The function of the prefix di- is to make verbs passive. Its meaning is "to be subjected to an action." For example:

- di- + tulak 'reject' → ditulak 'to be rejected'
- di- + basu 'wash' → dibasu 'to be washed'
- di- + pujuk 'persuade' → dipujuk 'to be persuaded'
- di- + bai 'pay' → dibai 'to be paid'

The prefix sa- has only one form: sa-. The function of the prefix sa- is to indicate adjectives or to express quantity. Its meaning conveys "the same as what is stated in the root form" or "one." For example:

- sa- + singkek 'brief' → sasingkek 'as brief as'
- sa- + lungga 'loose' → salungga 'as loose as'
- sa- + debak 'part' → sadebak 'a part'
- sa- + ruma 'house' → saruma 'the whole house'

==== Infixes ====
In the Pesisir language, there are three suffixes: -i, -an, and -kan.

The suffix -i has only one form: -i. The function of the suffix -i is to transform nouns into verbs or to form repetitive verbs. Its meaning is "to give or apply" or to indicate repetition. For example:

- surat 'letter' + -i → surati 'to send letter'
- gula 'sugar' + -i → gulai 'to add sugar'
- ampok 'hit' + -i → ampokki 'to hit multiple times'
- saikkekk 'comb' + -i → saikkeki 'to comb repeatedly'

The suffix -an has the forms -an, -kan, and -ran. The function of the suffix -an is to transform verbs into nouns. Its meaning indicates "the one who is subjected to the action." For example:

- bacca 'to read' + -an → baccaan 'reading materials'
- baris 'to line up' + -an → barisan 'line'
- bali 'to buy' + -an → balian 'bought goods'
- masak 'to cook' + -an → masakan 'cooked food'

The suffix -kan has only one form: -kan. The function of the suffix -kan is to form benefactive transitive verbs. Its meaning expresses "an order or a request. For example:

- juak 'to sell' + -kan → juakan 'sell it'
- baok 'to bring' + -kan → baokan 'bring it'
- cangkuk 'hoe' + -kan → cangkukan 'dig it (using hoe)'
- suok 'to feed' + -kan → suokkan 'feed it'

==== Circumfixes ====
There are four confixes in the Pesisir language, namely: ka-...-an, di-...-an, pa-...-an, and basi-...-an.

The confix ka-...-an has the forms ka-...-kan, ka-...-an, and ka-...-ran. Its functions include transforming verbs into passive verbs, turning nouns into passive verbs, changing the type of adjective, or forming abstract nouns. The meaning of ka-...-an indicates "subjected to an action," "too (very)," or "state/condition." For example:

- ka- + ujan 'rain' + -an → kaujanan 'to get caught in the rain'
- ka- + siang 'noon' + -an → kasiangan 'too noon (oversleep)'
- ka- + manjo 'spoil' + -an → kamanjoan 'too spoiled'
- ka- + barani 'brave' + -an → kabaranian 'braveness'

The confix pa-...-an has the forms pa-...-an, pan-...-an, pang-...-an, pany-...-an, and pam-...-an. Its function is to change the meaning of nouns and transform verbs into nouns. The meaning of pa-...-an indicates "a place where something is obtained, done, or used." For example:

- pa- + mandi 'bath' + -an → pamandian 'bathing place'
- pa- + goreng 'fry' + -an → panggorengan 'frying place'
- pa- + suo 'meet' + -an → pansuoan 'meeting place'
- pa- + ambik 'take' + -an → pangambikan 'pickup place'

The confix basi-...-an has the forms basi-...-an and basi-...-kan. Its function is to form reciprocal verbs. The meaning of basi-...-an is "mutual" or "each other." For example:

- basi- + tenju 'punch' + -an → basitenjuan 'to punch each other'
- basi- + kajar 'chase' + -an → basikajaran 'to chase one other'
- basi- + tundo 'push' + -an → basitundoan 'to push one other'
- basi- + lanting 'throw' + -an → basilantingan 'to throw one other'

=== Reduplication ===
Reduplication in the Pesisir language consists of two parts: base word reduplication and affixed word reduplication.

Base word reduplication does not involve any change in the word form. The purpose of base word reduplication is to modify the meaning of the word. It signifies pluralization when the base word is a noun and conveys "carrying out an action in a relaxed manner" when the base word is a verb. For example:

- rajo 'king' → rajo-rajo 'kings'
- ula 'snake' → ula-ula 'snakes'
- golek 'lie' → golek-golek 'lying relaxingly'
- makkan 'eat' → makkan-makkan 'eating relaxingly'

Affixed word reduplication serves various functions and carries different meanings depending on the affixes applied. For instance, reduplication with the prefix ma- functions to form verbs from nouns or modify the meaning of verbs. This type of reduplication conveys meanings such as "performing an action in a way that pleases the doer" or "carrying out an action playfully." Similarly, reduplication with the prefix ba- functions to make verbs intransitive, create repetitive verbs, or alter the meaning of adjectives. The meanings associated with this reduplication include "using as a form of address or utilizing," "performing actions repeatedly," or "very." Examples include:

- goreng 'to fry' → menggoreng-goreng 'frying not in a serious manner'
- sapu 'broom' → menyapu-nyapu 'sweeping not in a serious manner'
- camin 'mirror' → bacamin-camin 'to look at the mirror repetitively'
- darei 'noisy' → badarei-darei 'very noisy'

=== Compounds ===
Compound words in the Pesisir language can be analyzed from two perspectives: their constituent elements and the meaning they convey. The constituent elements of compound words in the Pesisir language are divided into three types: adjective + noun, verb + noun, and verb + verb. The meaning of compound words is often figurative, although in some cases, the meaning can still be derived from the individual elements that compose them. Example of compounds are:

- gadang 'big' + sarawa 'pants' → gadang sarawa '
- tagak 'upright' + duduk 'sit' → tagak duduk 'very nervous'
- pata 'broken' + tabu 'sugar cane' → pata tabu 'completely broken'
- makkan 'eat' + tidu 'sleep' → makkan tidu 'jobless'

=== Nouns ===
Nouns in the Pesisir language have several characteristics, such as being formed using affixes -an, ka-...-an, and pa-...-an, being pluralized through reduplication, being followed by demonstrative pronouns, being replaced by interrogative pronouns, or being preceded by numerals. Nouns can be classified into two categories: countable and uncountable. Countable nouns often require specific classifiers or measuring words depending on the context. For example, urang 'person' is used for people, ikku 'tail' for animals, and bijo 'fruit' for objects like fruits, among others. Examples are:

- tigo urang upahan 'three labors'
- limo urang pancilok 'five thieves'
- ampek bijo pau 'four mangoes'
- sapulu ikku lauk 'ten fishes'

Examples of uncountable nouns are:

- ai 'water'
- kabuk 'fog'
- rambuk 'hair'
- karancakkan 'beautiness'

=== Verbs ===
Verbs in the Pesisir language have several characteristics, such as being able to be prefixed with ma- or ba- or suffixed with -kan and -i, and they can be made passive with the prefixes di- and ta-. Verbs can be divided into three categories: verbs that cannot be followed by nouns, verbs that can be followed by a single noun, and verbs that can be followed by a noun followed by a particle and another noun. Example of verbs that cannot be followed by nouns are:

- datang 'to come'
- bajalan 'to walk'
- pai 'to go'

Examples of verbs that can be followed by a single noun are:

- menanti gandak 'to wait for lover'
- mambahei batu 'to throw rocks'
- mancilok kepeng 'to steal money'

Examples of verbs that can be followed by a noun followed by a particle and another noun are:

- manggule lauk untuk umak 'to add gulai to the fish for mother'
- mengambikkan pau untuk si Asik 'to grab mango for Asik'

=== Adjectives ===
Adjectives in the Pesisir language have several characteristics, such as being followed by a noun, preceded by the affixes ta-, sa-, and -an, or being followed by the particle bana 'very'. Adjectives in the Pesisir language can be divided into three categories: simple adjectives, which do not indicate comparison or excessiveness; comparative adjectives, which show comparison; and excessive (or superlative) adjectives, which indicate an exaggerated or excessive state. Comparative adjectives can be further divided into three subcategories: equal comparative adjectives, which express equality; more-than comparative adjectives, which indicate a higher degree; and most comparative adjectives, which express the highest degree.

Examples of simple adjectives are:

- pane 'hot'
- gaek 'old'

Examples of comparative adjectives are:

- sarancak 'as pretty as'
- lawean 'wider'
- tagadang 'largest'

Examples of excessive adjectives are:

- kalitakkan 'too tired'
- karancakkan 'too beautiful due to excessive adornment or an overly elaborate way of dressing up'

=== Numerals ===
Numerals are typically followed directly by nouns in the Pesisir language. Numerals are divided into three types: cardinal numbers, indefinite numbers, and collective numbers. Examples of cardinal numbers are:

- satu 'one'
- duo 'two'
- limo bale 'fifteen'

Examples of indefinite numbers are:

- sadonya urang 'everyone'
- banyak pelawik 'many seaman'
- saketek lauk 'few fishes'

Examples of collective numbers are:

- barampek pai 'four of them are going'
- balimo bajalan 'five of them walking'
- saincek-saincek pukkek 'one by one'

== Vocabulary ==
Most of the vocabularies in the Pesisir language are derived from Minangkabau, specifically the Pariaman dialect spoken in Pariaman and Padang Pariaman Regency in West Sumatra. However, the Pesisir language has absorbed loanwords from Batak and Malay, as well as from standard Indonesian, like many other regional languages in Indonesia. The table below provides examples of common Pesisir vocabulary used on a daily basis along with their Standard Minangkabau, Indonesian, and English translations.

=== Numerals ===
Number	Pesisir	Standard Minangkabau	Indonesian	English
1	satu	ciek, satu, aso	satu	one
2	duo	duo	dua	two
3	tigo	tigo	tiga	three
4	ampek	ampek	empat	four
5	limo	limo	lima	five
6	anam	anam	enam	six
7	tuju	tujuah	tujuh	seven
8	salapan	lapan	delapan	eight
9	sambilan	sambilan	sembilan	nine
10	sapulu	sapuluah	sepuluh	ten
11	sabale	sabaleh	sebelas	eleven
15	limo bale	limo baleh	lima belas	fifteen
50	limo pulu	limo puluah	lima puluh	fifty
100	saratui	saratuih	seratus	one hundred
150	saratui limo pulu	saratuih limo puluah	seratus lima puluh	one hundred and fifty
500	limo ratui	limo ratuih	lima ratus	five hundred
1000	saribu	saribu	seribu	one thousand

=== Directions ===
Pesisir	Standard Minangkabau	Indonesian	English
ikko	iko	ini	this
innun	itu	itu	that
sikko	siko	sini	here
situ	sinan	sana	there
disikko	disiko	di sini	over here
disitu	disinan	di sana	over there
salatan	salatan	selatan	south
utaro	utara	utara	north
barat	barat, baraik	barat	west
timur	timur, timo	timur	east

=== Personal Pronouns ===
Pesisir	Standard Minangkabau	Indonesian	English
ambo	ambo, awak	aku, saya	I, me
ang, munak, awakang	ang, waang, awak, kau	kamu, engkau	you (singular)
munak	kalian	kalian	you (prural)
inyo, awaknyo	inyo, wakno, ano	dia	he/she
kami, kito	awak, kami, kito	kita	we
sidak, sadonyo	urang-urang	mereka	they

=== Interrogatives Pronouns ===
Pesisir	Standard Minangkabau	Indonesian	English
apo	a, apo	apa	what
siapo	sia, siapo	siapa	who
mangapo	mangapo, manga, dek a	mengapa	why
dimano	dimano, dima	dimana	where
bagaimano	bagaimano, ba a	bagaimana	how
pabilo	bilo	kapan	when

=== Nouns ===
Pesisir	Standard Minangkabau	Indonesian	English
laki-laki	laki-laki	laki-laki	man
padusi	padusi	perempuan	woman
urang	urang, ughang	orang	people
lauk	ikan, lauak	ikan	fish
batang	pokok, pohon	pohon	tree
kulik	kulik	kulit	skin
tulang	tulang	tulang	bone
ikku	ikua	ekor	tail
rambuk	rambuik	rambut	hair
mato	mato	mata	eye
talingo	talingo	telinga	ear
gigik	gigi	gigi	tooth
muluk, muncung	muluik, muncuang	mulut	mouth
idung	iduang	hidung	nose
lawik	lauik	laut	sea
bua	buah	buah	fruit
angin	angin	angin	wind
pasi	pasia, kasiak	pasir	sand
batu	batu	batu	stone
ai	aie, aia	air	water
kabuk	kabuik	kabut	fog
ambun	awan	awan	cloud
asok	asok	asap	smoke

=== Verbs ===
Pesisir	Standard Minangkabau	Indonesian	English
minum	minum	minum	drink
makkan	makan	makan	eat
liek	lieq	lihat	see
main	main	main	play
jatu	jatuah	jatuh	to fall
tidu	tidua, lalok	tidur	sleep
duduk	duduak	duduk	sit
tagak	tagak	berdiri	stand
baranang	baranang	berenang	swim
bajalan	bajalan	berjalan	walk
bagolek	babariang, bagolek	berbaring	lie down
basu	basuah, cuci	cuci	wash
datang	datang, tibo	datang	arrive
bahei	baeh	lempar	to throw
mahampok	mamukua, malantuang	memukul	to punch
gigik	gigik	gigit	to bite
elak	elo	tarik	pull

=== Adjectives ===
Pesisir	Standard Minangkabau	Indonesian	English
baharu	baru	baru	new
lamo	lamo	lama	old
sajuk	dingin, sajuak	dingin, sejuk	cold
pane	paneh, angek	panas	hot
gadang	gadang, godang	besar	large
tenggi	tinggi, tenggi	tinggi	tall
panjang	panjang	panjang	long
rancak	rancak, kamek	cantik	pretty
tipih	tipih	tipis	thin
lawe	laweh	luas	wide
lamak	lamak	sedap, enak	delicious
karing	kariang	kering	dry
panu	panuah	penuh	full
banyak	banyak	banyak	many
mabuk	mabuak	mabuk	drunk

== See also ==
- Minangkabau people
- Jamee language

== Bibliography ==
- Simorangkir, Setiana; Lubis, Amir Husin; Sihombing, Heddina; Silitonga, Sortha (1986). Struktur Bahasa Pesisir Sibolga [Structure of the Pesisir Language in Sibolga] (PDF) (in Indonesian). Jakarta: Language Development and Cultivation Center, Department of Education and Culture.
- Nasution, Abdusima (2021). Pesisir Barus dalam perspektif sejarah dan budaya sejak klasik hingga kontemporer [The Pesisir Barus in Historical and Cultural Perspectives from Classical to Contemporary Eras] (PDF) (in Indonesian). Yogyakarta: Zahir Publishing.
