= Tuangku =

Island in Indonesia

Coordinates: 2°14′N 97°14′E

Tuangku (also known as Great Banyak) is the main and largest island in the Banyak Islands group in Indonesia. The largest town on the island is Haloban.

As a consequence of the 2005 Nias–Simeulue earthquake, the island dropped rendering the coastal residences useless and damaging the port.
