= Simeulue Barat =

West Simeulue (Kecamatan Simeulue Barat)
- District (Kecamatan)
- Location within Sumatra
- Coordinates: 2°47′30″N 95°56′36″E
- Country: Indonesia
- Province: Aceh
- Regency: Simeulue

Area
  - Total: 446.07 km^{2} (172.23 sq mi)

Population (mid 2023 estimate)
  - Total: 12,302
  - Density: 27.579/km^{2} (71.428/sq mi)
- Time zone: UTC+7 (WIB)

Simeulue Barat (West Simeulue) is a district of the Simeulue Regency on Simeulue in the Indonesian province of Aceh. At the 2010 Census it had a total population of 10,024 people, which by mid 2023 had grown to an officially estimate total of 12,302.
