= Salang, Aceh =

Salang
- Districvt (Kecamatan)
- Location within Sumatra
- Coordinates: 2°39′49″N 95°51′24″E
- Country: Indonesia
- Province: Aceh
- Regency: Simeulue

Area
  - Total: 198.96 km^{2} (76.82 sq mi)

Population (mid 2023 estimate)
  - Total: 9,222
  - Density: 46.35/km^{2} (120.0/sq mi)
- Time zone: UTC+7 (WIB)

Salang is an administrative district (kecamatan) of the Simeulue Regency on Simeulue island in the Indonesian province of Aceh. At the 2010 Census it had a total population of 7,625 people, which by mid 2023 had increased to 9,222.

== Administrative divisions ==
Salang is divided administratively into 16 kampong:

- Along
- Bunga
- Ganang Pusako
- Jaya Baru
- Karya Bakti
- Kenangan Jaya
- Lalla Bahagia
- Meunafah
- Mutiara
- Nasreuhe
- Padang Unoi
- Panton Lawe
- Suak Manang
- Tameng
- Tamon
- Ujung Salang
