= Simeulue Tengah =

Central Simeulue (Kecamatan Simeulue Tengah)
- District (Kecamatan)
- Location within Sumatra
- Coordinates: 2°36′15″N 96°0′32″E
- Country: Indonesia
- Province: Aceh
- Regency: Simeulue

Area
  - Total: 112.48 km^{2} (43.43 sq mi)

Population (mid 2023 estimate)
  - Total: 7,647
  - Density: 67.99/km^{2} (176.1/sq mi)
- Time zone: UTC+7 (WIB)

Simeulue Tengah (Central Simeulue) is a district of the Simeulue Regency on Simeulue island in the Indonesian province of Aceh. At the 2010 Census it had a total population of 9,010 people, living in 1,930 households in 2005. Following the splitting off of eight villages (kampong) to form a separate Simeulue Cut district in 2012, the reduced Simeulue Tengah District covers 112.48 km^{2} and had a population of 7,647 in mid 2023.

== Administrative divisions ==
As at 2010, Simeulue Tengah was divided administratively into 24 kampong. However in 2012 eight of these were removed from the regency to form a new district (kecamatan) of Simeulue Cut. The remaining sixteen kampong are:

- Dihit
- Kampung Aie
- Kuta Batu
- Lakubang
- Lamayang
- Lambaya
- Latitik
- Lauke
- Lauree
- Luan Sorip
- Putra Jaya
- Sebee
- Situfa Jaya
- Suak Baru
- Wel Langkum
- Wel Wel
