= Teluk Dalam, Aceh =

Teluk Dalam Kecamatan Teluk Dalam
- District (Kecamatan)
- Location within Sumatra
- Coordinates: 2°37′30″N 96°12′32″E
- Country: Indonesia
- Province: Aceh
- Regency: Simeulue

Area
  - Total: 224.68 km^{2} (86.75 sq mi)

Population (mid 2023 estimate)
  - Total: 5,709
  - Density: 25.41/km^{2} (65.81/sq mi)
- Time zone: UTC+7 (WIB)

Teluk Dalam (Indonesian: Teluk Dalam) is an administrative district (kecamatan) of the Simeulue Regency on Simeulue island in the Indonesian province of Aceh. At the 2010 Census it had a total population of 5,091 people, which by mid 2023 had increased to 5,709.

== Administrative divisions ==
Teluk Dalam is divided administratively into 10 kampong:

- Babussalam
- Bulu Hadik
- Gunung Putih
- Kuala Bakti
- Kuala Baru
- Luan Balu
- Lugu Sebahak
- Muara Aman
- Sambay
- Tanjung Raya
