= Simeulue Timur =

East Simeulue (Kecamatan Sileulue Timur)
- District (Kecamatan)
- Location within Sumatra
- Coordinates: 2°31′7″N 96°20′3″E
- Country: Indonesia
- Province: Aceh
- Regency: Simeulue

Area
  - Total: 175.97 km^{2} (67.94 sq mi)

Population (mid 2023 estimate)
  - Total: 28,830
  - Density: 163.8/km^{2} (424.3/sq mi)
- Time zone: UTC+7 (WIB)

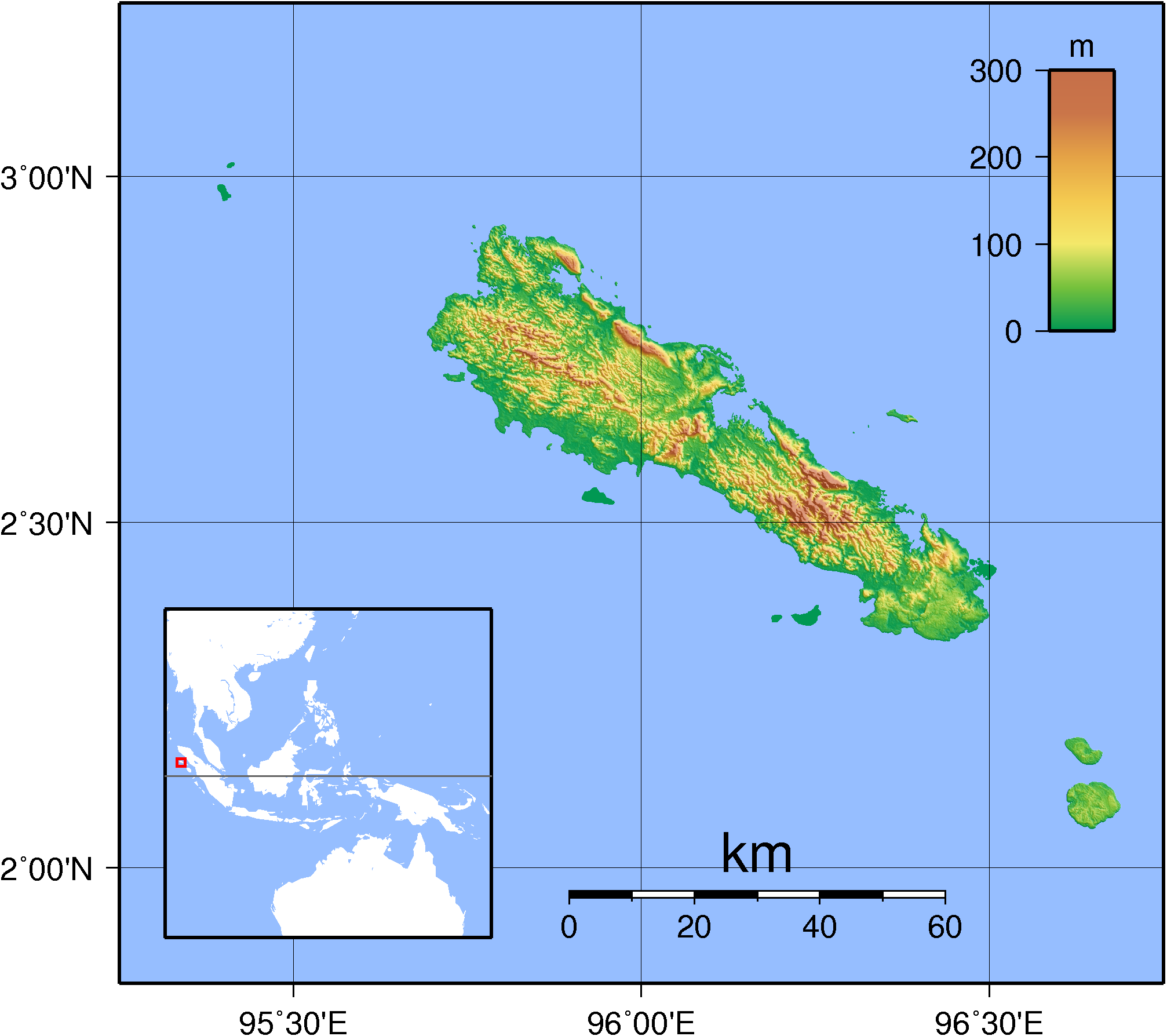
Topographic map of Simeulue, Indonesia.

Simeulue Timur (East Simeulue) is a district of the Simeulue Regency on Simeulue island in the Indonesian province of Aceh. At the 2010 census, it had a total population of 28,931 people, living in 4,334 households in 2005. In 2020, after being reduced in 2012, it covered 175.97 km^{2} and had a population of 27,569 at the 2020 Census; the official estimate as at mid 2023 was 28,830.

== Administrative divisions ==
As at 2010, Simeulue Timur was divided administratively into 29 villages (desa/kelurahan.) However, in 2012 twelve of these desa were split off to form a new district of Teupah Tengah (Central Teupah). The remaining 17 desa are:

- Air Dingin
- Air Pinang
- Amaiteng Mulia
- Ameria Bahagia
- Ganting
- Kota Batu
- Kuala Makmur
- Linggi
- Lugu
- Pulau Siumat
- Sefoyan
- Sinabang
- Suak Buluh
- Suka Jaya
- Suka Karya
- Suka Maju
- Ujung Tinggi

The town of Sinabang is the administrative headquarters of Simeulue Regency It is situated on a large bay on the northeast coast of the island.
