= Teupah Selatan =

South Teupah (Kecamatan Teupah Selatan)
- District (Kecamatan)
- Location within Sumatra
- Coordinates: 2°22′0″N 96°26′13″E
- Country: Indonesia
- Province: Aceh
- Regency: Simeulue

Area
  - Total: 222.24 km^{2} (85.81 sq mi)

Population (mid 2023 estimate)
  - Total: 9,444
  - Density: 42.49/km^{2} (110.1/sq mi)
- Time zone: UTC+7 (WIB)

South Teupah (Indonesian: Teupah Selatan) is an administrative district (Kecamatan) of the Simeulue Regency on Simeulue island in the Indonesian province of Aceh. As of 2020 it had a total population of 9,030 people. while the official estimate as at mid 2023 was 9,444.

== Administrative divisions ==
Teupah Selatan is divided administratively into 16 desa / kelurahan:

- Alus Alus
- Ana Ao
- Badegong
- Batu Ralang
- Blang Sebel
- Kebun Baru
- Labuan Bajau
- Labuan Bakti
- Labuhan Jaya
- Lataling
- Latiung
- Pasir Tinggi
- Pulau Bengkalak
- Seuneubok
- Suak Lamatan
- Ulul Mayang
