= Teupah Barat =

West Teupah (Kecamatan Teupah Barat)
- District (Kecamatan)
- Location within Sumatra
- Coordinates: 2°28′32″N 96°12′37″E
- Country: Indonesia
- Province: Aceh
- Regency: Simeulue

Area
  - Total: 146.73 km^{2} (56.65 sq mi)

Population (mid 2023 estimate)
  - Total: 8,378
  - Density: 57.10/km^{2} (147.9/sq mi)
- Time zone: UTC+7 (WIB)

West Teupah (Indonesian: Teupah Barat) is an administrative district (kecamatan) of the Simeulue Regency on Simeulue island in the Indonesian province of Aceh. As at mid 2023 it had an officially estimated population of 8,378.

== Administrative divisions ==
Teupah Barat is composed of eighteen administrative villages (kampong):

- Angkeo
- Awe Kecil
- Awe Seubal
- Bunon
- Inor
- La'ayon
- Lantik
- Leubang
- Leubang Hulu
- Maudil
- Naibos
- Nancala
- Pulau Teupah
- Salur
- Salur Lasengalu
- Salur Latun
- Silengas
- Sital
