= Alafan =

Alafan (Kecamatan Alafan)
- District (Kecamatan)
- Location within Sumatra
- Coordinates: 2°47′41″N 95°45′41″E
- Country: Indonesia
- Province: Aceh
- Regency: Simeulue

Area
  - Total: 191.87 km^{2} (74.08 sq mi)

Population (mid 2023 estimate)
  - Total: 5,154
  - Density: 26.86/km^{2} (69.57/sq mi)
- Time zone: UTC+7 (WIB)

Alafan is an administrative district (kecamatan) of the Simeulue Regency on Simeulue in the Indonesian province of Aceh. At the 2010 Census it had a total population of 4,479 people, which by mid 2023 had grown to an officially estimated total of 5,154.

== Administrative divisions ==
Alafan is divided administratively into 8 gampong:

No.	Name
1	Lewak
2	Lamerem
3	Lhok Pauh
4	Serafon
5	Langi
6	Lubuk Baik
7	Lhok Dalam
8	Lafakha
