= 1907 Sumatra earthquake =

Earthquake off the coast of Sumatra, Indonesia

- Location within Sumatra
- UTC time: 1907-01-04 05:19:11
- ISC event
- USGS-ANSS: ComCat
- Local date: 4 January 1907
- Local time: 12:19
- Magnitude: 7.5–8.0 M_{s} 8.2–8.4 M_{w}
- Epicenter: 2.5°N 95.5°E
- Fault: Sunda megathrust
- Type: Megathrust
- Max. intensity: EMS-98 IV (Largely observed)–EMS-98 V (Strong)
- Tsunami: Yes
- Casualties: 2,188 dead

The 1907 Sumatra earthquake occurred on 4 January at 05:19:12 UTC. The re-estimated moment magnitude (Mw) is 8.2 to 8.4, with an epicentre close to Simeulue, off Sumatra. An earlier study re-estimated a surface-wave magnitude (Ms) of 7.5 to 8.0. It triggered a widespread and damaging Indian Ocean wide tsunami that caused at least 2,188 deaths on Sumatra. The low observed intensity compared to the size of the tsunami has led to its interpretation as a tsunami earthquake. Higher levels of shaking observed on Nias are attributed to a large aftershock, less than an hour later. The tsunami gave rise to the S'mong legend, which is credited with saving many lives during the 2004 earthquake.

== Tectonic setting ==
Sumatra lies above the convergent plate boundary, where the Australian plate is being subducted beneath the Sunda plate along the Sunda megathrust. The convergence on this part of the boundary is highly oblique and the strike-slip component of the plate motion is accommodated along the right-lateral Great Sumatran fault. Movement on the Sunda megathrust has caused many great earthquakes.

== Earthquake ==
This earthquake has been regarded as anomalous, in comparison to other Sunda megathrust events, due to the small amount of observed shaking compared to the scale of the triggered tsunami. Both the location of the epicentre and the magnitude of the earthquake are uncertain.

=== Aftershocks ===
Re-examination of seismometer recordings identified a second earthquake about 53 minutes after the mainshock. This aftershock was responsible for the intense shaking reported from Nias. A magnitude of 7.1 M_{s} has been estimated for this event. Two other significant aftershocks have also been identified from seismograph records and a further 19 events are known from contemporary reports.

=== Epicentral location ===
Many estimates have been made for the epicentre of this earthquake. Most of the early estimates of the location place it in the outer rise of the subducting plate rather than on the plate interface. Such earthquakes can generate tsunamis, but are highly unlikely to be tsunami earthquakes. More recent estimates give a range of epicentres, including some located on a shallow part of the megathrust, although the uncertainties remain large. Martin et al. (2019) give their preferred location as just west of Simeulue, coincident with a major barrier to rupture propagation along the megathrust caused by a ridge associated with a fracture zone on the subducting plate. This location is in a similar part of the megathrust as the epicentre of the 2010 Mentawai tsunami earthquake.

=== Magnitude ===
There are sufficient instrumental recordings preserved for this earthquake to allow an estimate of its magnitude. A range of 7.5–8.0 M_{s} has been estimated from seismograms, a magnitude that is insufficient to explain the observed tsunami. The surface wave magnitude for this earthquake was calculated from seismic waves with a period up to 40 seconds. For a tsunami earthquake however, a large part of the energy release is at much longer periods (lower frequencies). Observations of the amplitude of Rayleigh and Love waves from recorded seismograms have been used to estimate a seismic moment (M_{0}) of 2.5×10^{28} for periods in the range 100–160 seconds (6–10 MHz), equivalent to M_{w} of 8.2. These observations also demonstrate an increase in moment with increasing period and the longest available period of 170 seconds suggests a value for M_{w} of about 8.4.

=== Fault model ===
The nature of the earthquake matches well with a fault model that involves slip on the uppermost part of the megathrust, consistent with the location of other tsunami earthquakes. A rupture length of about 250 km (160 mi) and a down-dip extent of up to 80 km (50 mi) combined with a maximum slip of 21 m (69 ft) is capable of generating the observed tsunami.

== Tsunami ==
The tsunami that accompanied this earthquake was observed as far away as Sri Lanka, Réunion and Rodrigues in the Indian Ocean. It was most destructive along the coast of Simeulue. It gave rise to the S'mong legend amongst the Simeuluean people, which persisted through oral tradition. In 2004 the S'mong is credited with saving the lives of many people on Simeulue and neighbouring Nias as inhabitants ran to higher ground following the earthquake. There are few reliable run-up measurements, but the scale of the tsunami has been estimated from reports of inundations on both Simeulue and Nias. The maximum observed inundation was 2–3 km (1.2–1.9 mi) at Lakubang on the southern coast of Simeulue and a maximum estimated run-up in the range 7–15 m (23–49 ft) based on reports of the loss of coconut palms on the small island of Pulau Wunga off northwestern Nias.

== Damage ==
Due to the relatively low level of shaking associated with the mainshock, almost all the damage and casualties were a result of the tsunami. The tsunami earthquake resulted in an anomalously low shaking intensity of IV–V (European macroseismic scale) compared to the instrumentally determined moment magnitude of 8.2–8.4. The Nias aftershock, in contrast, damaged many buildings on that island which is equivalent to VII. The number of casualties based on contemporary reports are 370 on Nias and a minimum of 1,818 on Simeulue.
