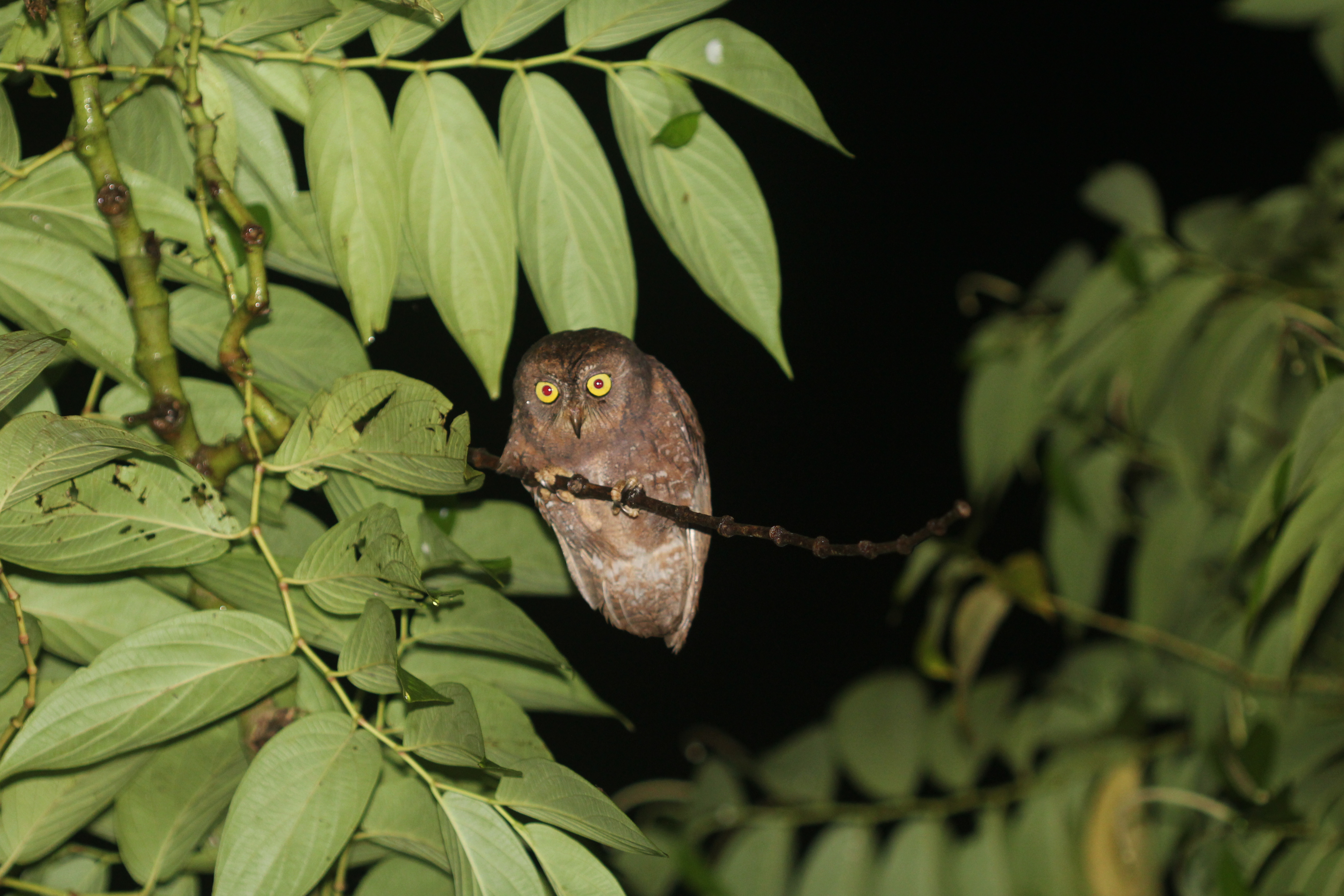

Conservation status
- Near Threatened (IUCN 3.1)
- CITES Appendix II (CITES)

Scientific classification
- Kingdom: Animalia
- Phylum: Chordata
- Class: Aves
- Order: Strigiformes
- Family: Strigidae
- Genus: Otus
- Species: O. umbra

Binomial name
- Otus umbra (Richmond, 1903)

= Simeulue scops owl =

Species of owl

The Simeulue scops owl (Otus umbra) is an owl species endemic to the island of Simeulue, Indonesia.
