= Sinabang =

Coordinates: 2°29′00″N 96°22′30″E

Sinabang is a town on the east coast of Simeulue Island, which lies off the western coast of Sumatra in Indonesia. Sinabang is the administrative seat (capital) of the Simeulue Regency, in Aceh Province of Indonesia and has a population of approximately 20,000.

== Earthquakes ==
On 28 March 2005, a magnitude 8.6 earthquake, the third most powerful earthquake in Indonesia since 1965, and a subsequent fire destroyed 50 to 60 percent of the downtown area and significantly damaged the port facility. The land rose 40 cm at Sinabang as a result of the quake.

== Climate ==
Sinabang has a tropical rainforest climate (Af) with heavy to very heavy rainfall year-round.

Climate data for Sinabang
Month	Jan	Feb	Mar	Apr	May	Jun	Jul	Aug	Sep	Oct	Nov	Dec	Year
Mean daily maximum °C (°F)	30.9 (87.6)	31.6 (88.9)	32.1 (89.8)	32.4 (90.3)	32.4 (90.3)	32.3 (90.1)	32.1 (89.8)	32.0 (89.6)	31.4 (88.5)	31.2 (88.2)	30.6 (87.1)	30.5 (86.9)	31.6 (88.9)
Daily mean °C (°F)	26.7 (80.1)	27.0 (80.6)	27.3 (81.1)	27.7 (81.9)	27.8 (82.0)	27.5 (81.5)	27.2 (81.0)	27.1 (80.8)	27.0 (80.6)	27.0 (80.6)	26.6 (79.9)	26.6 (79.9)	27.1 (80.8)
Mean daily minimum °C (°F)	22.5 (72.5)	22.4 (72.3)	22.6 (72.7)	23.1 (73.6)	23.2 (73.8)	22.7 (72.9)	22.3 (72.1)	22.3 (72.1)	22.6 (72.7)	22.9 (73.2)	22.7 (72.9)	22.7 (72.9)	22.7 (72.8)
Average rainfall mm (inches)	247 (9.7)	195 (7.7)	260 (10.2)	289 (11.4)	247 (9.7)	181 (7.1)	211 (8.3)	242 (9.5)	299 (11.8)	376 (14.8)	369 (14.5)	319 (12.6)	3,235 (127.3)
Source: Climate-Data.org
