= Banyak Islands =

Island group in Indonesia

Coordinates: 2°10′N 97°15′E

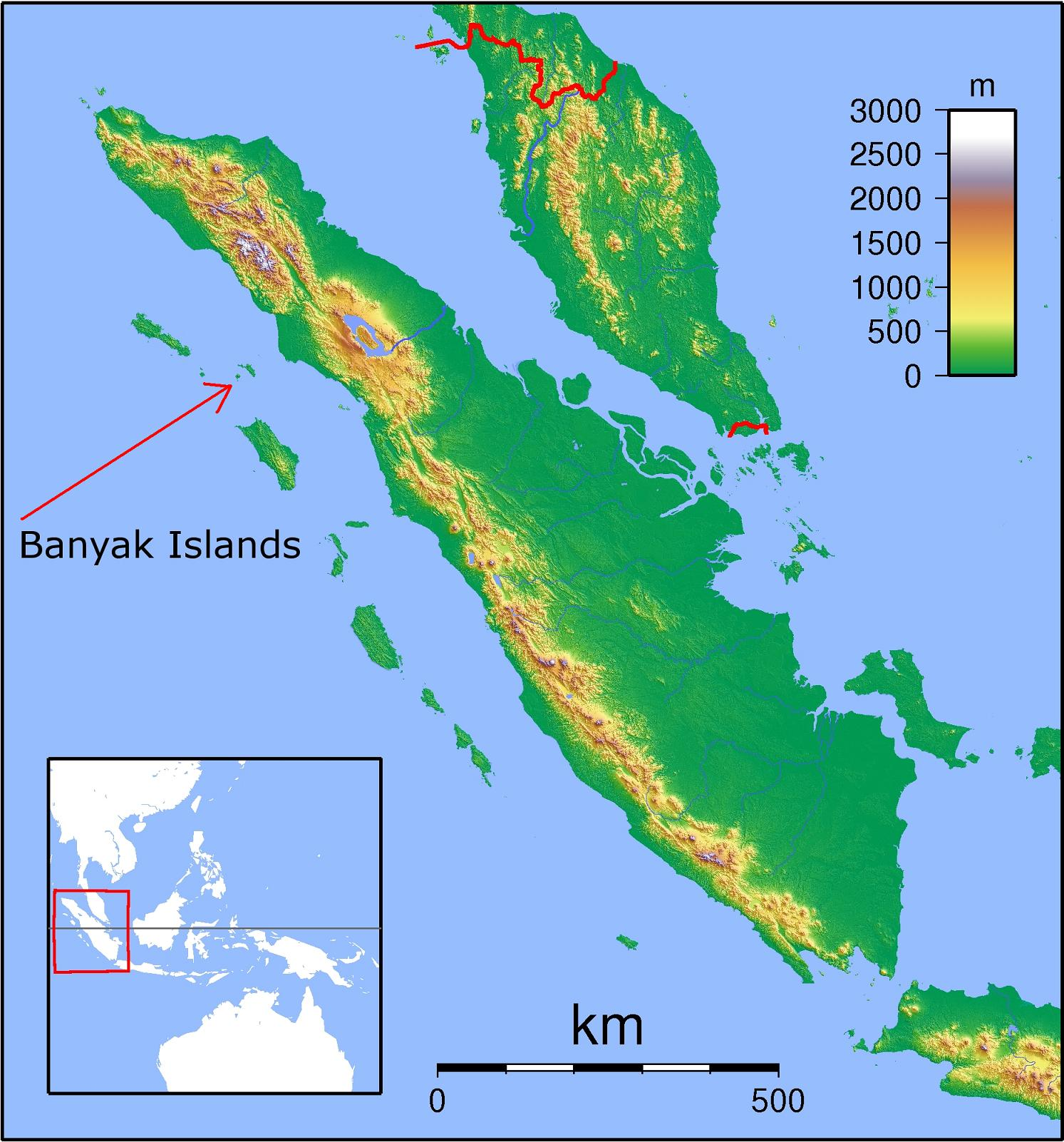
Banyak Islands

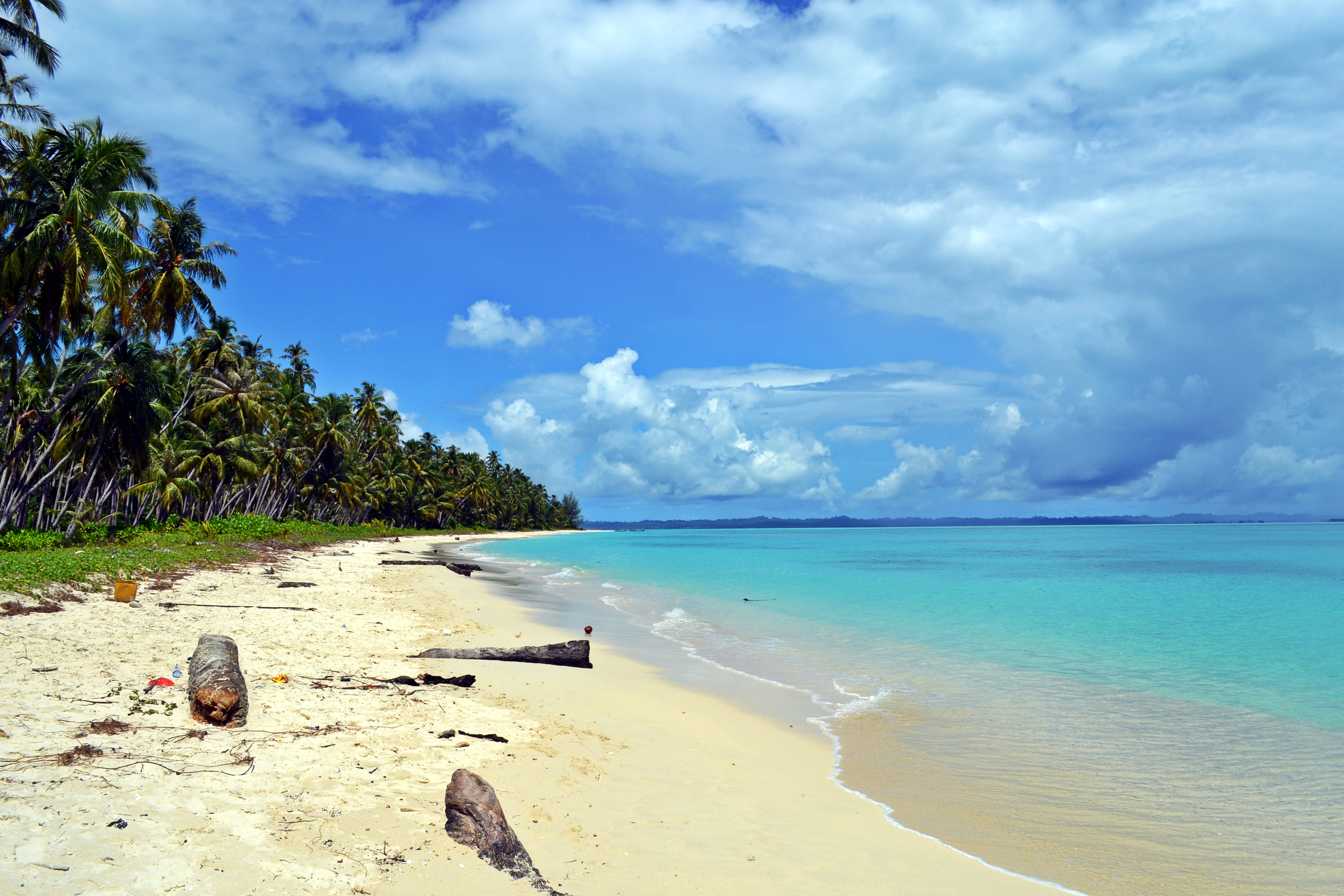
Palambak Island

The Banyak Islands (Indonesian: Kepulauan Banyak, [kəpuˌlawan ˈbaɲak̚]; sometimes spelled Banjak Islands) are a group of inhabited islands located between Simeulue and Nias off the western coast of Sumatra in Indonesia's Aceh Province. Surveys of the area approximate around 75 islands and additional mangrove stands in shallow off-shore areas, although locals count 99 islands. The largest island in the group is Tuangku, with the principal village of Haloban on its coast. The second major island is Bangkaru (uninhabited, and designated as a nature park) located southwest of Tuangku. Tuangku is separated from Bangkaru by a fault line, but the two form the West Banyak Islands district, which was separated from the original district that covered all the islands in the group. Numerous small islands lie between Tuangku and the coast of Sumatra to the northeast and form the residual Banyak Islands District; few of these are inhabited.

== Geography ==
With an area of 96.25 square miles (249.31 square km), the group lies north of Nias and 18 miles (29 km) west of Sumatra in the Indian Ocean. The islands have long been noted for the existence of substantial offshore coral reefs, though problems with overharvesting, damage from explosives, and recent geological disturbances have threatened these underwater resources.

The islands vary in their land cover; most are sandy with limited vegetation, while the larger islands have deep rainforests and are fringed by intertidal mangroves. The Pulau Banyak area contains many varieties of stony Heliopora and branching Acropora types of coral. However, crown-of-thorns starfish are a significant problem. The fringing coral reefs are habitat to diverse species, including green and leatherback sea turtles, pelagic and coral fish, and varieties of octopus, lobster, and other sea life. The weather is tropical; August to January are the rainy season, followed by a dry season from approximately February to July.

The island group had a population of 6,570 persons at the 2010 Census and 7,640 at the 2020 Census. The majority of the population resides in villages on the islands of Pulau Tuangku, Pulau Baguk and Pulau Balai. Most of the dozens of small islands in the area have no permanent homes but are used instead for gardening and leisure, with small pondoks and bungalows constructed for temporary visits. The population is spread throughout the main islands, but divided administratively into villages, listed below with their areas and their populations at the 2010 Census and 2020 Census, together with the official estimates as at mid 2024:

| Name of District (kecamatan) | Name of Village (gampong) | English name | Area (km^{2}) | Pop'n 2010 census | Pop'n 2020 census | Pop'n estimate mid 2024 |
|---|---|---|---|---|---|---|
| Pulau Banyak | Pulau Baguk | Baguk Island | 6.17 | 1,358 | 1,545 | 1,705 |
| | Pulau Balai | Balai Island | 10.00 | 1,608 | 1,927 | 2,029 |
| | Teluk Nibung | Nibung Bay | 2.50 | 950 | 1,090 | 1,092 |
| Pulau Banyak Barat | Asantola | | 3.49 | 562 | 786 | 850 |
| | Ujung Sialit | Point Sialit | 9.00 | 1,093 | 1,152 | 1,276 |
| | Haloban | | 217.01 | 830 | 867 | 892 |
| | Suka Makmur | | 1.14 | 169 | 273 | 352 |
| Totals | | | 249.31 | 6,570 | 7,640 | 8,196 |

== Administrative districts ==
The Banyak Islands lie within the Aceh Singkil Regency in Aceh Province, and are divided into two districts (kecamatan): Banjak Islands District (Kecamatan Pulau Banyak) and Western Banjak Islands District (Kecamatan Pulau Banyak Barat). The latter district was separated from the former district subsequent to the 2010 Census. Pulau Balai is the seat of the Pulau Banyak District, whose present area had 3,916 inhabitants at the 2010 Census and 4,562 at the 2020 Census, and Haloban is the seat of the Pulau Banyak Barat District, whose present area had 2,654 inhabitants at the 2010 Census and 3,078 at the 2020 Census.

== Demography ==
The inhabitants of the Banyak Islands consist of three ethnic groups, namely Aneuk Jamee (in Pulau Balai, Pulau Baguk and Teluk Nibung), Haloban (in Haloban and Asantola villages) and Nias (in Ujung Sialit and Suka Makmur villages). The Nias people in Ujung Sialit are Christians while in Suka Makmur they are Muslims.

== Earthquakes and tsunamis ==
The island group was significantly affected by the deadly 2004 Indian Ocean earthquake and subsequent tsunami. The quake's epicenter was located only a few hundred kilometres north of the island group. Along with Simeulue and Nias, the Banyak Islands absorbed the shock waves and shielded a lot of damage from the Mentawai Islands. The eastern islands were affected the most due to the poor construction of buildings, as many structures contained timber instead of concrete. As many as 300 residents of the island group died as a result of the tsunami.

Occurring just three months later, the 2005 Nias–Simeulue earthquake was located slightly east of Bangkaru, which was the closest island to the epicenter. The island was hit by a second tsunami that caused additional flooding and damage to structures. The level of the islands also dropped by as much as a meter in places, plunging coastal areas underwater and making them permanently uninhabitable. There were no reported deaths, but over 3,000 people were reportedly displaced from their homes. Due to the split between Tuangku and Bangkaru, the earthquake caused Bangkaru to rise and Tuangku to drop. Wells became contaminated by saltwater following the meter-high surge that hit the villages, and the tsunami flowed 100–200 meters into the dense jungle. Fresh sand carried by the tsunami adhered on the seaward side of tree trunks as high as one meter above ground level.

== Economy ==
The area is popular among tourists on surfing holidays with some of the better waves being witnessed at Bangkaru due to the larger fetch. Another major sector of the local economy is fishing, which is based on individual small boats, particularly the multi-hulled proa. The islands support limited farming, though this is insufficient to supply the needs of islanders, and a significant quantity of fresh food is brought in from Singkil. Infrastructure projects have worked to restore the harbors and piers of the islands that were damaged in the 2005 tsunami events

== Environmental conservation and management ==
The island of Bangkaru is a protected area, designated by the Governor of Aceh in 1996 as a "Taman Wisata Alam" (Nature Park). This designation limits fishing and other use of resources around the island, with limited use for research, tourism, and cultural activities. Beaches on Bangkaru are significant turtle rookeries, where green, leatherback, and other sea turtles come to nest and lay eggs. In the past, local people have collected turtle eggs for consumption and sale, and turtles have also been caught by poachers from Sibolga, but this practice is now illegal within the protected area. Turtles are also sometimes hunted for the lucrative export market in turtle meat. Other species in danger from overharvesting include the giant clam and the dugong. Environmental hazards created by climate change, ocean acidification, overfishing and unsustainable practices remain concerns for the region.

== See also ==
- List of islands of Indonesia
