= Simeulue =

Island in Indonesia

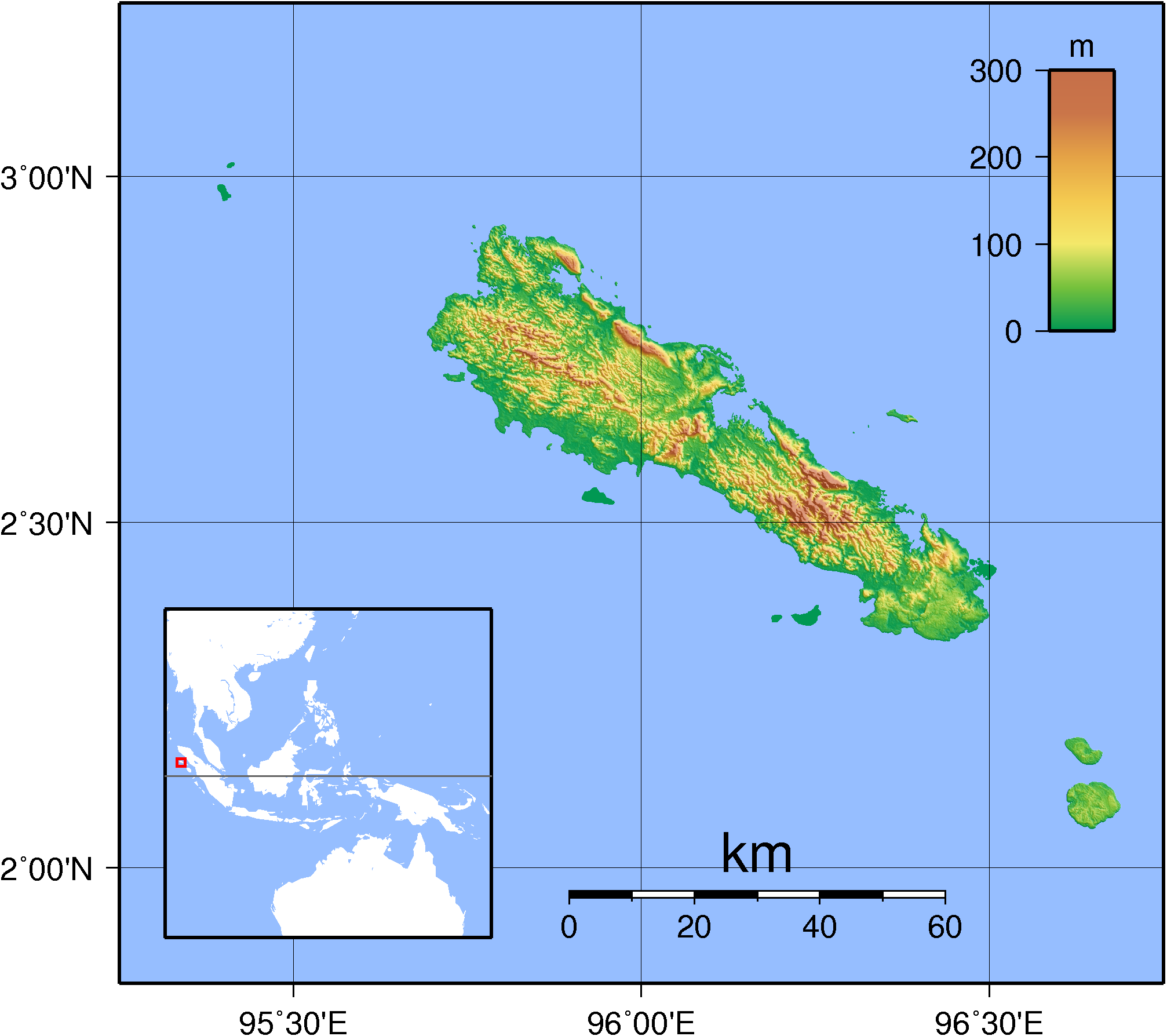
- Topographic map of Simeulue
- Interactive map of Simeulue

Geography
- Location: South East Asia
- Coordinates: 02°37′48″N 96°05′24″E
- Area: 1,754 km^{2} (677 sq mi)
- Highest elevation: 567 m (1860 ft)
- Highest point: unnamed

Administration
- Indonesia
- Province: Aceh
- Regency: Simeulue Regency
- Largest settlement: Sinabang

Demographics
- Population: 93,762 (mid 2021 estimate)
- Pop. density: 51.0/km^{2} (132.1/sq mi)
- Ethnic groups: Simeulue and Sigulai

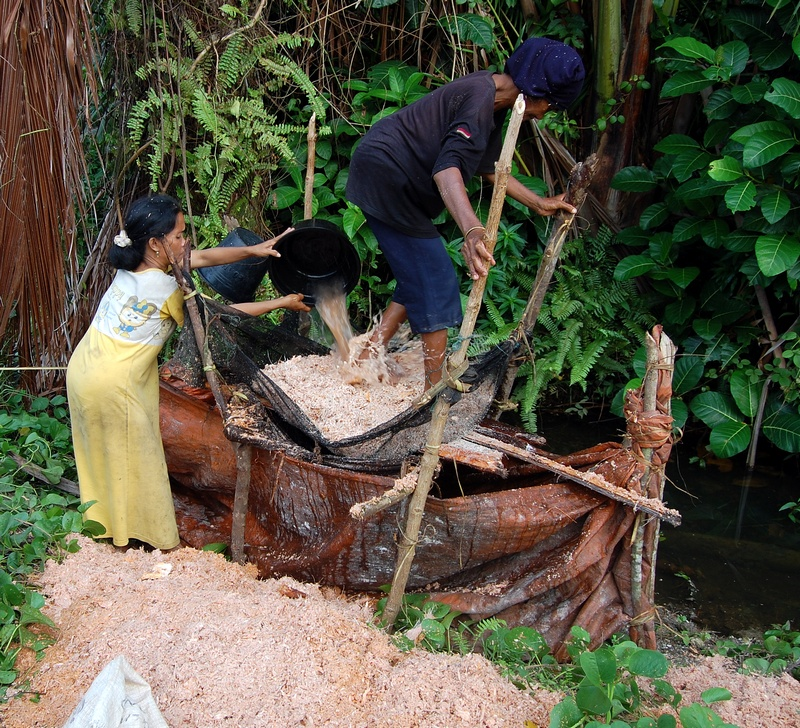
Washing the pith of sago palm (Metroxylon sagu); Simeulue

Simeulue /sɪməˈluːeɪ/ is an island of Indonesia, 150 kilometres (93 mi) off the west coast of Sumatra. It covers an area of 1,754 square kilometre (677 square miles), including minor offshore islands. It had a population of 80,674 at the 2010 census and 92,865 at the 2020 census. The official estimate as at mid 2021 was 93,762.

Simeulue was once a part of West Aceh Regency but was split off in 1999 and became a separate Simeulue Regency. Its capital is Sinabang.

== Demographics ==
From the ethnic point of view the inhabitants of Simeulue are similar to the people of neighboring Nias Island. Two languages and a number of dialects are spoken on the island: Simeulue and Sigulai, which are different from the languages spoken in the north of Sumatra. The majority of the island's population is Muslim.

== History ==
In the 17th century Tengku Di brought Islam to the island and the first mosque was built in Salur village.

Simeulue was historically known to European mariners as "Hog Island" and served as a landfall for ships seeking ports on the west coast of Sumatra for the pepper trade. It was also known as "Pulo Oo", or "Coconut Island". Some historians suggest the fictional islands of Lilliput and Blefuscu in Gulliver's Travels (1726) might be described as two of Simeulue's remote islands in the Indian Ocean: Devayan and Sigulai.

In 1901 during the Aceh War the Dutch colonial empire government took control of Simeulue.

=== 1907 Tsunami ===
On the 4th of January 1907 the 1907 Sumatra earthquake with a 7.5-8 magnitude earthquake shook the seabed off the West coast of Simeulue and caused a tsunami with waves reported to be 10–15 meters (30 to 50 feet) high. This tsunami led to the death of more than 50% (some report as high as 70%) of the Simeulue population. The tsunami hit on a Friday while most people were gathering in mosques for their Friday Prayer. It is said that after it hit, the roads connecting villages were wiped out and turned into mud bogs. It was reported that many of the people who died were found at the tops of coconut trees that were around 10 meters high (30 feet), or they were found on the tops of hills that were many kilometers (miles) inland. They had an estimated 20 minutes after the earthquake before the tsunami hit. It is believed that this was the largest local earthquake in their history.

After this tsunami hit, directions to flee after an earthquake became integrated into their culture to prepare everybody and avoid death in the future. The debris left over is said to have been seen piled on the hills for a generation.

=== 2004 Indian Ocean earthquake ===
Simeulue was close to the epicenter of the 9.3 magnitude 26 December 2004 earthquake.

On 26 December 2004, an 9.1 magnitude earthquake struck with its epicenter just off the south end of the island. It occurred when the India oceanic tectonic plate was subducted beneath the Burma micro-plate which is a part of the Sunda plate. The interface between the plates resulted in large faults which is called an interpolate thrust or a megathrust. During the earthquake, Simeulue waters rose at least 10 meters (30 ft) on the western coast; this left the flat top of its coral reefs above high tide. On the east coast, the land was submerged, with seawater flooding fields and settlements.

Although Simeulue Island was only 60 kilometers (40 miles) from the epicenter of the 2004 earthquake, whereas Banda Aceh – the city that was hit hardest by the tsunami – was about 250 kilometers (150 miles) away, only seven residents on Simeulue died, while the remaining 70,000 survived. Information on how many people survived varies depending on different sources. Overall the estimation is between 70,000 and 75,000. This has been argued to have been due to local wisdom of the 'Smong' (meaning Tsunami) that educates the listener on the warning signs of a tsunami and advises them to seek higher ground. Smong is derived from the term Kemong or Semongan which means "tidal wave" in Devayan dialect of Simeulue language which is their native language. Smong is a traditional poem written by Muhammad Riswan after the 1907 tsunami that contains instructions on how to evacuate when an earthquake or tsunami occurs. Smong was passed down through oral communication. There are multiple versions of this poem, but the most common states (in English) "It started with earthquakes followed by a giant wave the whole land was sinking immediately if the strong earthquake is followed by the receding of the ocean please hurry and find a higher place to run to." Smong is a source of pride for the citizens and they believe that it provides a basis for national discussion on devastating natural hazards. They believe that knowledge of smong can potentially substantially reduce and possibly eliminate casualties from tsunamis.

The citizens were formally recognized on an international scale by being awarded the United Nations Sasakawa Award for Disaster Reduction by the United Nations Office for Disaster Risk Reduction (UNDRR). They were given the award on October 12, 2005, in Thailand. It is believed by many that the reason for such a high survival rate was due to their island folklore and oral traditions.

Mohd Riswan, a 73-year-old man from the island stated that he remembers his father telling him growing up "An earthquake was followed by giant waves. The whole country sank suddenly. If an earthquake is strong, followed by receding water, immediately find higher ground to be safe. Remember this message and advice." He states that he recalled being told about this type of event and that is what caused him and his family to get to safety and they all survived. Riswan also states that the younger generations aren't speaking the local language as much which is bringing concerned about if they will effectively keep passing down their stores. He urges the youth to adapt and keep passing down for future generations safety and is confident that they will since they learn about it in school.

== Oral Traditions ==
Historically, Simeulue society, culture and practices are guided by ancestral indigenous wisdom which are passed down through oral tradition. These oral traditions include Nandong (humming with kedang and or violin), nanga-nanga (sung storytelling) and mananga-nanga (lullabies). These traditions have allowed for stories such as the 'smong' to be passed down generationally. They also have a song called 'nandong' that is an emotional song that the sing at weddings and social gatherings that says to run if the earth shakes and the water recedes. The words to this song in English states: " One day in the past our village sinks starting with the earthquake then followed by rising waves sinking the whole village immediately if a strong earthquake occurs followed by the receding sea water hurry run to a higher place. These oral traditions were started after the 1907 tsunami and is taught to everyone on the island.

== Tourism ==
Over the past ten years Simeulue has become a popular surfing destination. The southwest-facing portion of the island is home to surf resorts. The island's surf breaks gained international attention when the World Surf League (WSL) Simeulue Pro was held at Dylan's Point.

== See also ==
- Simeulue language
- Simeulue scops owl
