= List of disasters in Indonesia =

The following is a list of disasters in Indonesia that have had widespread effects or received substantial attention. It is split into natural and manmade disasters, which includes deliberate actions, and is further sorted by date.

== Natural disasters ==
- The Mount Tambora eruption on 10 April 1815 and the November 1815 Buleleng earthquake contribute to killing 12,000 and eventually 100,000 from famine.
- On 16 February 1861, a major earthquake struck Sumatra, killing thousands.
- During 26–27 August 1883, the Krakatoa volcano erupted leading to at least 36,000 deaths. The after effects included a tsunami.
- On 2 February 1938, a very large earthquake followed by a tsunami in the Banda Sea caused widespread damage but no fatalities.
- The 1976 Bali earthquake happened at 15:13 local time on 14 july, having a magnitude of 6.5 and leaving 573 killed and more than 4,700 injured along with damage of US$195 million.
- On 26 june 1976, the 1976 Papua earthquake left destruction in the island of Papua, causing landslides that killed at least 422 and left over 5,000 missing that were presumed dead.
- In 1992 the 1992 Flores earthquake and tsunami happened on December 12, having a magnitude of 7.8 and leaving 2,500 dead and 500 injured.
- In 1997, a series of forest fires broke out, causing a haze in much of Asia and worldwide environmental damage.
- On 26 December 2004, a massive earthquake followed by a tsunami affected fourteen nations with Indonesia worst affected. The tsunami killed a total of approximately 230,000 people.
- On 28 March 2005, the 2005 Nias-Simeulue earthquake struck northern Sumatra, having a magnitude of 8.6 richter and killing 1,314 people, devastating the islands of Nias and Simeulue.
- A major earthquake in Yogyakarta on 27 May 2006 killed 5,716 people.
- A magnitude 7.7 earthquake caused a tsunami around west and central Java on 17 July 2006 and killed 668 people.
- The 2007 Bengkulu earthquakes on 13-14 September caused 25 deaths and 161 injuries, leaving significant damage.
- The 2009 Sumatra earthquakes on 30 September caused severe damage in Western Sumatra, killing around 1,110 people and leaving 2,180 injured.
- The 2010 Mentawai earthquake and tsunami occurred on 25 October, severely damaging Western Sumatra and the Mentawai islands, killing 408 people and leaving 303 missing.
- The 2010 eruptions of Mount Merapi occurred in late October between Central Java and the Special Region of Yogyakarta, killing around 353 people and forcing 350,000 to evacuate.
- The 2016 Aceh earthquake occurred on 7 December, causing significant damage in Aceh province and causing 104 dead and at least 1,200 injured, along with 84,000 displaced.
- On 29 November 2017, Cyclone Cempaka struck southern Java and killed at least nineteen.
- In early February 2018, floods across Jakarta affected 11,450 people, with over 6,000 evacuated.
- On 21 February 2018, a Landslide in Pasirpanjang, Brebes, Central Java killed eighteen people.
- On 5 August 2018 the 5 August 2018 Lombok earthquake struck the island of Lombok, causing property damage of 8.8 trillion Indonesian Rupiah (US$607 million) killing 563 and injuring 1,353
- On 28 September 2018, a magnitude 7.5 earthquake followed by a tsunami struck Sulawesi and led to the deaths of at least 4,340 people and injured about 10,679 with about 667 missing.
- On 22 December 2018, an eruption of the Anak Krakatau volcano and underwater landslides caused the 2018 Sunda Strait tsunami. It led to the deaths of at least 437 people and injured more than 14095.
- On 26 September 2019 the 2019 Ambon earthquake struck Seram Island in Maluku with a magnitude of 6.5 richter, killing 41 and leaving 1,578 injured.
- On 4 December 2021, Semeru erupted for a second time in the year – the first having been in January 2021. Semeru erupted a third time on 6 December 2021.
- On 21 November 2022, a magnitude 5.6 earthquake followed by landslide struck West Java and led to the deaths of at least 635 people and injured about 7,729 with about 5 missing.
- On 26 November 2025, Cyclone Senyar was formed and made landfall in the Northern Sumatra resulting in heavy rains, flash floods, and landslides in 3 provinces : Aceh, North Sumatra, and West Sumatra. At least a total of 1,200 deaths, over 7,000 injuries, and 143 missing persons were reported in Indonesia following the incident.

== Manmade disasters ==
- Mass killings in 1965–66, ruled by the International Criminal Court to constitute a genocide that Indonesia was responsible for and the United Kingdom, the United States, and Australia were complicit in, killed at least 400,000 and up to three million. The killings targeted alleged communists.
- On 22 April 1974, Pan Am Flight 812, a Boeing 707, crashed into a mountainside near Denpasar, Bali killing all 107 on board.
- On 31 March 1981, authorities stormed Garuda Indonesia Flight 206 in Bangkok, Thailand killing five of the Islamic terrorists who had hijacked the domestic flight over Indonesia.
- On 26 September 1997, Garuda Indonesia Flight 152, an Airbus A300 flying from Soekarno-Hatta International Airport, Tangerang to Polonia International Airport, Medan crashed into mountainous woodlands near Buah Nabar Sibolangit village, killing all 234 on board.
- In May 1998, race riots broke out throughout the country, resulting in largescale fatalities and over 150 reported rapes.
- On 12 October 2002, the Bali bombings killed at least 182 most of whom were foreign tourists.
- On 9 September 2004, a bombing at the Australian embassy in Jakarta killed ten people.
- On 30 December 2006, passenger liner MV Senopati Nusantara sank in the Java Sea near Mandalika Island, with hundreds believed to have drowned.
- On 1 January 2007, Adam Air Flight 574, a Boeing 737, crashed into the Makassar Strait off the coast of Sulawesi at a depth of more than 2,000 meters, leaving all 102 occupants missing and presumed dead.
- On 7 March 2007, Garuda Indonesia Flight 200, a Boeing 737, overshot the runway at Adisucipto International Airport and killed 21 people on board.
- On 26 November 2011, the Kutai Kartanegara Bridge in Borneo collapsed, resulting in 39 deaths.
- On December 28 2014, Indonesia AirAsia Flight 8501, a Airbus A320 stalls and crashes into the Java Sea at the depth 30 meters, Killing all 162 on board.
- In 2015, a string of forest fires caused widespread toxic haze, and were described by the Meteorology, Climatology and Geophysics Agency as a "crime against humanity".
- On 1 April 2018, an oil pipeline owned by state firm Pertamina burst in Balikpapan Bay, Borneo. The oil subsequently ignited leaving several fishermen dead.
- In April 2018, tainted alcohol was discovered in Jakarta and West Java, which was mixed with caffeinated energy drinks and herbal drinks, and suspected to contain mosquito repellent. At least 82 died, with others hospitalised.
- On 29 December 2025, a fire at a nursing home in Manado, Indonesia, killed 16 people. Three people were injured.

== See also ==
- List of aviation accidents and incidents in Indonesia
