= 2006 Java earthquake =

The 2006 Java earthquake may refer to:

- 2006 Yogyakarta earthquake
- 2006 Pangandaran earthquake and tsunami

== See also ==
- List of earthquakes in Indonesia
