= Pasir Panjang (disambiguation) =

Pasir Panjang is an area located at the southern part of Queenstown in Singapore.

Pasir Panjang may also refer to:

- Pasir Panjang, Negeri Sembilan, town in Port Dickson District, Negeri Sembilan, Malaysia
- Pasir Panjang (state constituency), state constituency in Perak, Malaysia

== See also ==
- Pasirpanjang, Indonesia, village in Indonesia
