= 2006 Mozambique earthquake =

Earthquake in southeastern Africa

- Location within Mozambique Location within Africa
- UTC time: 2006-02-22 22:19:07
- ISC event: 8096170
- USGS-ANSS: ComCat
- Local date: 23 February 2006
- Local time: 00:19:07 CAT
- Magnitude: M_{w} 7.0
- Depth: 11 km (6.8 mi)
- Epicenter: 21.324°S 33.583°E
- Type: Dip-slip
- Areas affected: Southern Mozambique
- Total damage: 706 structures damaged or destroyed
- Max. intensity: MMI X (Extreme)
- Aftershocks: 86 ≥M_{w} 4.0 (as of 31 December 2006); M_{w} 5.7 on 23 February 2006 (strongest)
- Casualties: 5 dead, 40 injured

On 23 February 2006, at 00:19:07 CAT (22:19:07 UTC on 22 February), a M_{w} 7.0 earthquake struck southern Mozambique. It caused moderate damage and several fatalities in the country. It was the largest historical earthquake in Mozambique and the first earthquake in southern Africa to have an identified surface rupture.

== Tectonic setting ==
Southern Mozambique is at the southern end of the East Africa Rift system, where the African plate appears to be breaking into several smaller plates. The Somali plate is moving westward relative to the Nubian Plate at a rate of several millimetres a year at the latitude of this earthquake. Most earthquakes in this zone are a result of either normal or strike-slip faulting.

== Earthquake ==
The epicenter was located in Machaze District, Manica Province, just north of the Save River. The focal mechanism of the earthquake is consistent with dip-slip faulting on a westerly dipping fault plane. Field investigations identified 15 km of surface rupture in the form of a west-facing scarp, with up to 2.05 m of vertical displacement, although it was not possible to prove the full extent of surface faulting due to lack of time and the presence of minefields. Investigations using Interferometric synthetic aperture radar (InSAR), combined with field and seismological observations, have identified two fault segments with slightly differing strikes, with the hypocenter and most of the displacement being on the more southerly of the segments. By the end of 2006, 86 aftershocks exceeding M_{w} 4.0 or higher were recorded, the strongest of which measured M_{w} 5.7.

The earthquake was felt throughout Mozambique and over a wide area of eastern southern Africa, including South Africa, Swaziland, Zambia, Zimbabwe and Botswana. On the Modified Mercalli intensity scale (MMI), the maximum intensity was X (Extreme). In the cities of Beira, Inhambane and Maputo, the intensity reached V (Moderate). In eastern Zimbabwe, the maximum MMI was IV-V (Light-Moderate), while in Louis Trichardt and Phalaborwa, South Africa, the MMI was IV (Light). Tremors were also felt in Zambia, Botswana and Swaziland.

== Impact ==
In Beira, two people were killed, including one who died from a heart attack. ActionAid officials in the city reported that 13 houses had collapsed. Two people died and 13 were injured in Espungabera, where traditional homes collapsed. In Maputo, no structural damage was reported but 15 people were injured, mostly by attempts to escape buildings in panic. One additional person died in Machaze, with 40 injuries and 400 collapsed homes recorded across Mozambique. At least 294 buildings were damaged in Espungabera, Beira and Chimoio, while 288 homes collapsed in southern Manica Province, along with six schools, one water tank, three water points, and two small bridges.

Given its magnitude and location, the earthquake caused relatively minimal casualties and damage, as the epicentral area was sparsely populated with most people living in wattle-and-daub huts built using closely spaced timber verticals and a rather thick weave of material, which are generally earthquake-resistant.

== See also ==
- List of earthquakes in 2006
- 2005 Lake Tanganyika earthquake
