= 2006 Yanjin earthquake =

Earthquake in China

- Location within Yunnan
- UTC time: 2006-07-22 01:10:29
- ISC event: 8548476
- USGS-ANSS: ComCat
- Local date: 22 July 2006
- Local time: 09:10:29 CST
- Magnitude: 4.9 M_{w}
- Depth: 55.6 km (34.5 mi)
- Epicenter: 28.0°N 104.14°E
- Areas affected: China
- Max. intensity: MMI IV (Light)
- Casualties: 22 killed, 106 injured

The 2006 Yanjin earthquake occurred with a moment magnitude of 4.9 on July 22 at 01:10 UTC (09:10 local time). This destructive shock took place in Yanjin County, Yunnan, China. Twenty-two were killed and 106 were injured.

== Damage ==
Eight people were killed as a result of houses (usually wooden) collapsing and fourteen were killed from other reasons.

== See also ==
- List of earthquakes in 2006
- List of earthquakes in China
