= Mitata =

Mitata Μητάτα
- Community
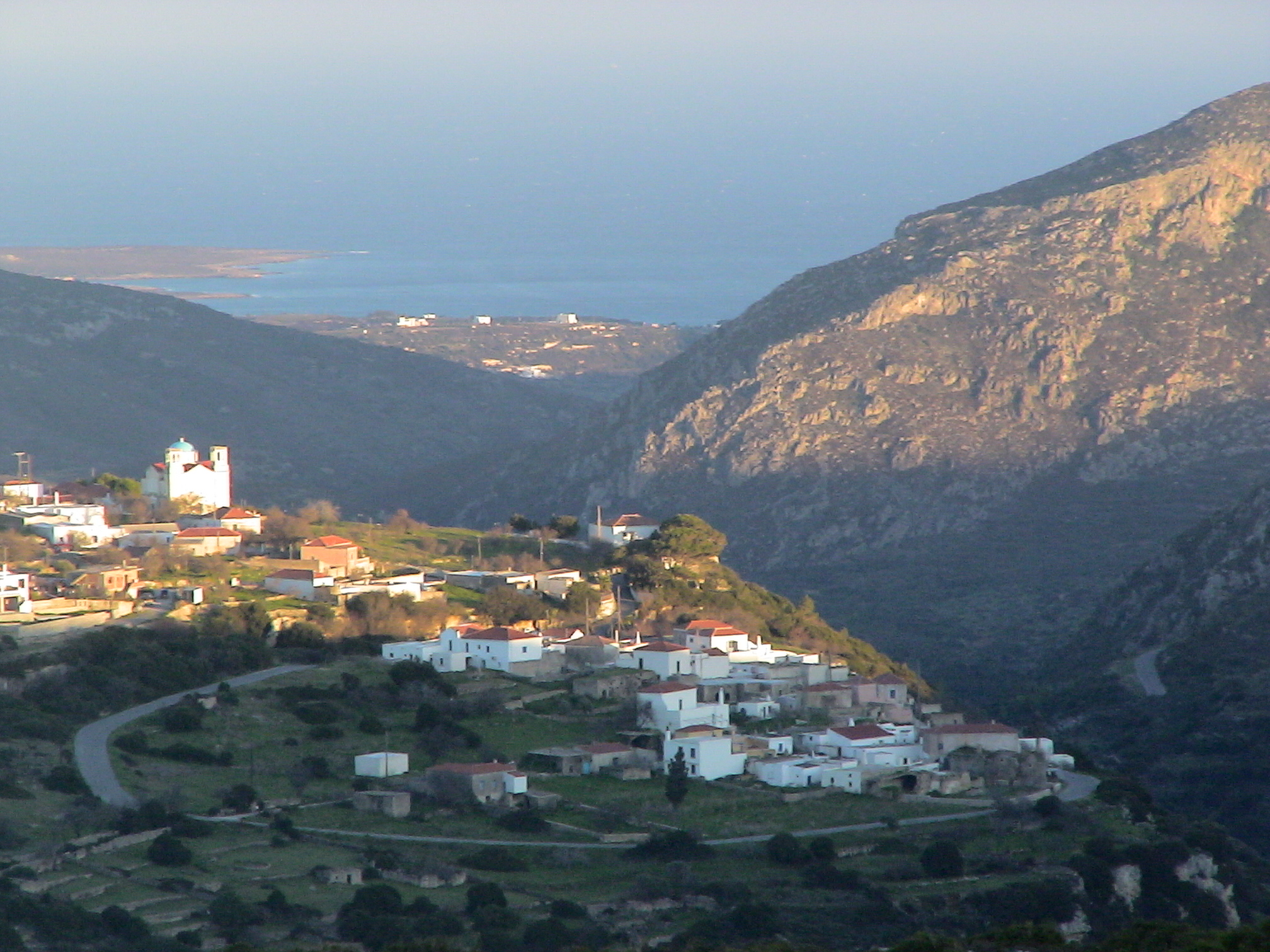
- Mitata with Palaiopoli in the background

- Location within Greece
- Coordinates: 36°14′49″N 22°59′39″E
- Country: Greece
- Administrative region: Attica
- Regional unit: Islands
- Municipality: Kythira
- Municipal unit: Kythira
- Elevation: 185 m (607 ft)

Population (2021)
  - Community: 217
- Time zone: UTC+2 (EET)
  - Summer (DST): UTC+3 (EEST)
- Postal code: 80100
- Area code: +30 27360

Mitata is a small village and community in the middle of the island of Kythira, Greece. Its average elevation is 185 m. Population 217 (2021).

== History ==
In 2006, an earthquake shattered Ayia Triadon making it no longer able to host church services. Mitata is on a cliff side looking over the neighbouring village of Viaradika. There is a cave underneath the Windmill resort called the "Mavri Spilaia" or "Black Cave".

== Notable people ==
- George Miller
