= List of earthquakes in 2006 =

Earthquakes in 2006
Approximate epicenters of the earthquakes in 2006
- 4.0–5.9 magnitude
- 6.0–6.9 magnitude
- 7.0–7.9 magnitude
- 8.0+ magnitude
- Strongest: 8.3 M_{w} Russia
- Deadliest: 6.3 M_{w} (Indonesia) Indonesia; 5,749 deaths
- Total fatalities: 6,602

Number by magnitude
- 9.0+: 0

Earthquakes in 2006 resulted in about 6,602 fatalities. The 2006 Yogyakarta earthquake was the deadliest with 5,749 fatalities. The 2006 Kuril Islands earthquake was the largest in 2006 at 8.3 on the moment magnitude scale. The 2006 Pangandaran earthquake and tsunami caused a significant tsunami that killed 730 people. Other significant earthquakes in 2006 struck Iran, Taiwan, China, Argentina, and Tajikistan.

== Compared to other years ==
Number of earthquakes worldwide for 1999–2009 []
Magnitude	1999	2000	2001	2002	2003	2004	2005	2006	2007	2008	2009
8.0–9.9	0	1	1	0	1	2	1	2	4	1	1
7.0–7.9	18	15	14	13	14	14	10	9	14	12	16
6.0–6.9	117	145	122	126	139	141	139	142	178	167	143
5.0–5.9	1,057	1,334	1,212	1,170	1,212	1,511	1,694	1,726	2,090	1,786	1,912
4.0–4.9	7,004	7,968	7,969	8,479	8,455	10,880	13,893	12,843	12,081	12,294	6,817
Total	8,296	9,462	9,319	9,788	9,823	12,551	15,738	14,723	14,367	14,261	8,891

== Overall ==
=== By death toll ===
Rank	Death toll	Magnitude	Location	MMI	Depth (km)	Date
1	5,749	6.4	Indonesia, Yogyakarta	IX (Violent)	15.0	May 26
2	730	7.7	Indonesia, West Java offshore	IV (Light)	25.3	July 17
3	70	6.1	Iran, Lorestan	IX (Violent)	10.0	March 31
4	22	4.9	China, Yunnan	V (Moderate)	55.6	July 22

- Note: At least 10 dead

=== By magnitude ===
Rank	Magnitude	Death toll	Location	Date
1	8.3	0	Russia	November 15
2	8.0	0	Tonga	May 3
3	7.7	730	Indonesia	July 17
4	7.6	0	Indonesia	January 27
4	7.6	0	Russia	April 20
6	7.4	0	(South Georgia and the South Sandwich Islands) East of The South Sandwich Islands	January 2
6	7.4	0	New Zealand, Kermadec Islands	May 16
8	7.2	0	Fiji	January 2
9	7.0	4	Mozambique	February 22
9	7.0	0	(Antarctica) Scotia Sea	August 20
9	7.0	2	Taiwan	December 26

- Note: At least 7.0 magnitude

== By month ==
=== January ===
January
- Strongest: 7.6 M_{w}, Indonesia
- Total fatalities: 0

Number by magnitude
- 7.0–7.9: 3
- 6.0–6.9: 6
- 5.0–5.9: 78

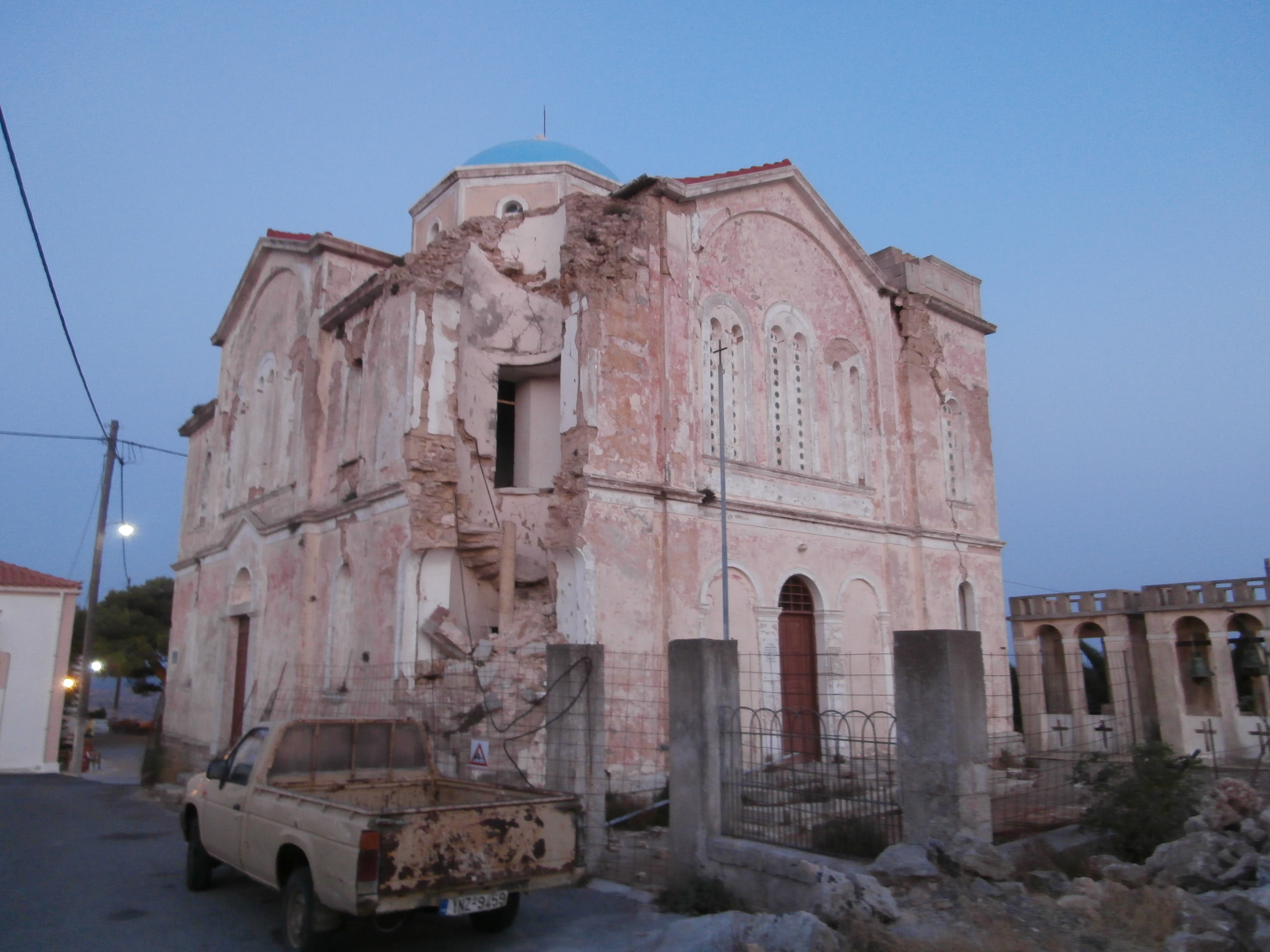
Damage after the earthquake in Cythera, Greece.

- (South Georgia and the South Sandwich Islands) A magnitude 7.4 earthquake struck east of South Sandwich Islands, on January 2, at a depth of 13.0 km (8.1 mi).
- A magnitude 7.2 earthquake struck Fiji, on January 2, at a depth of 582.9 km (362.2 mi).
- (Mexico) A magnitude 6.6 earthquake struck Gulf of California, on January 4, at a depth of 14.0 km (8.7 mi).
- A magnitude 6.1 earthquake struck south of Panama, on January 6, at a depth of 7.4 km (4.6 mi).
- A magnitude 6.7 earthquake struck Peloponnese Peninsula, Greece, on January 8, at a depth of 66.0 km (41.0 mi). Three people were slightly injured on Crete, and eighty homes and an airport were damaged on Cythera.
- (Indonesia) A magnitude 6.1 earthquake struck Flores Sea, on January 15, at a depth of 264.8 km (164.5 mi).
- A magnitude 6.4 earthquake struck Vanuatu, on January 23, at a depth of 23.0 km (14.3 mi).
- A magnitude 6.2 earthquake struck near west coast of Colombia, on January 23, at a depth of 14.0 km (8.7 mi).
- (Indonesia) A magnitude 7.6 earthquake struck Banda Sea, on January 27, at a depth of 397.0 km (246.7 mi).

=== February ===
February
- Strongest: 7.0 M_{w}, Mozambique
- Total fatalities: 6

Number by magnitude
- 7.0–7.9: 1
- 6.0–6.9: 9
- 5.0–5.9: 96

- A magnitude 6.7 earthquake struck Fiji, on February 2, at a depth of 600 km.
- A magnitude 6.1 earthquake struck Andaman Islands, India, on February 3, at a depth of 10 km.
- A magnitude 5.7 earthquake struck Sikkim, India, on February 14, at a depth of 33 km. Two people were killed by landslides at Sherathang, and two people were injured in eastern Sikkim. Moderate damage to buildings and roads was reported in the Gangtok area.
- (Northern Mariana Islands) A magnitude 6.3 earthquake struck Mariana Islands, on February 14, at a depth of 50 km.
- A magnitude 6.2 earthquake struck New Britain Island, Papua New Guinea, on February 18, at a depth of 20 km.
- A magnitude 4.6 earthquake struck Kardzhali Province, Bulgaria, on February 20, at a depth of 10 km. Two people were injured, at least 175 buildings slightly damaged and power and telephone service interrupted in the Murgovo area.
- A magnitude 7.0 earthquake struck Manica Province, Mozambique, on February 22, at a depth of 10 km. One person was killed at Espungabera, one at Machaze and two at Beira. Thirty-six people were injured and at least 294 buildings damaged in the Espungabera-Beira-Chimoio area.
- (Norway) A magnitude 6.1 earthquake struck Bouvet Island, on February 23, at a depth of 2 km.
- A magnitude 6.0 earthquake struck Fiji, on February 24, at a depth of 640 km.
- A magnitude 6.4 earthquake struck south of Fiji Islands, on February 26, at a depth of 500 km.
- A magnitude 6.0 earthquake struck Fiji, on February 26, at a depth of 33 km.
- A magnitude 6.0 earthquake struck Hormozgan Province, Iran, on February 28, at a depth of 40 km. Six people were injured in Kahnuj, and many buildings damaged or destroyed at Faryab.

=== March ===
March
- Strongest: 6.7 M_{w}, Indonesia
- Total fatalities: 78

Number by magnitude
- 7.0–7.9: 0
- 6.0–6.9: 11
- 5.0–5.9: 127

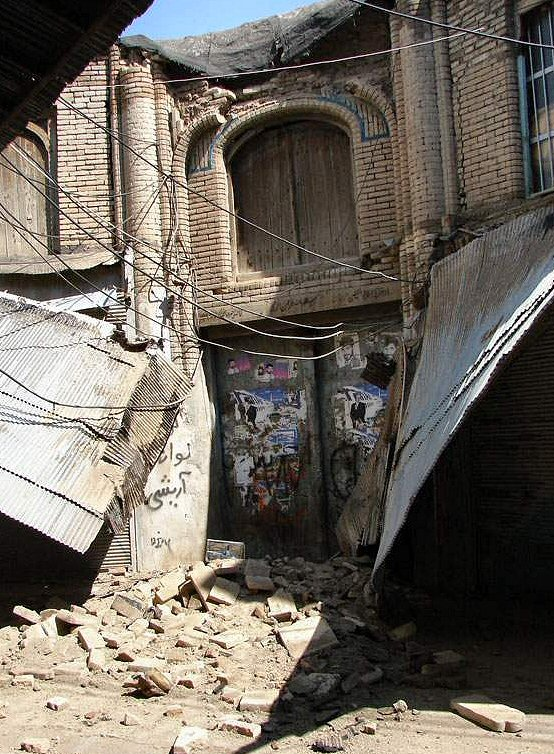
Damage to Carevanserai Hafezi in Bazaar of Borujerd, Iran.

- A magnitude 6.0 earthquake struck the Southern Mid-Atlantic Ridge on March 3 at a depth of 10 km.
- A magnitude 6.1 earthquake struck Tonga on March 5 at a depth of 205 km.
- A magnitude 6.2 earthquake struck the Mid-Indian Ridge on March 6 at a depth of 10 km.
- A magnitude 6.2 struck Vanuatu on March 7 at a depth of 133 km.
- A magnitude 5.5 earthquake struck Gujarat, India on March 7 at a depth of 10 km. At least 7 people were injured in the Jatawada-Rapar area and some buildings were damaged at Jatawada.
- A magnitude 6.0 earthquake struck the Central Mid-Atlantic Ridge on March 9 at a depth of 10 km.
- (Pakistan) A magnitude 4.9 earthquake struck the Kashmir region on March 10 at a depth of 10 km. One person was killed and 22 injured in Mirpur.
- A magnitude 6.7 earthquake struck Seram, Indonesia on March 14 at a depth of 30 km. 3 people died with 1 missing on Buru due to a localised tsunami with wave heights of up to 7 meters. 116 homes damaged or destroyed at Péla, 54 at Bata Jugku, 30 at Waimorot, 25 at Wailawa and 16 at Waimoly.
- A magnitude 5.2 earthquake struck Bejaia Province, Algeria on March 20 at a depth of 10 km. 4 people died and for 9 were injured at Kherrata. 30 homes were destroyed soon and 32 damaged.
- A magnitude 6.1 earthquake struck off the north coast of the Papua New Guinea mainland on March 24 at a depth of 12 km.
- A magnitude 6.0 earthquake struck Fiji on March 24 at a depth of 13 km.
- A magnitude 5.9 earthquake struck Hormozgan Province, Iran on March 25 at a depth of 18 km. 1 person died and 1 was injured at Fin. Homes were damaged in the area.
- A magnitude 6.1 earthquake struck Lorestan Province, Iran on March 31 at a depth of 7 km. Around 70 people died and more than 1,300 were injured in the Borujerd area. At least 40 villages were flattened in the vicinity.
- A magnitude 6.5 earthquake struck the Kermadec Islands, New Zealand region on March 31 at a depth of 13 km.
- A magnitude 6.1 earthquake struck the Talaud Islands, Indonesia on March 31 at a depth of 37 km.

=== April ===
April
- Strongest: 7.6 M_{w}, Russia
- Total fatalities: 1

Number by magnitude
- 7.0–7.9: 1
- 6.0–6.9: 17
- 5.0–5.9: 181

- A magnitude 6.1 earthquake struck off the coast of Tai-tung, Taiwan on April 1 at a depth of 9 km. There were 42 people injured and some buildings damaged in the area.
- A magnitude 6.0 earthquake struck off the coast of Jalisco, Mexico on April 4 at a depth of 33 km.
- A magnitude 4.8 earthquake struck Khyber Pukhtoonkhwa, Pakistan on April 4 at a depth of 10 km. At least 28 people were injured and several houses damaged or destroyed at Battagram.
- A magnitude 6.5 earthquake struck Fiji on April 7 at a depth of 14 km.
- A magnitude 6.0 earthquake struck off the east coast of Kamchatka, Russia on April 12 with a depth of 29 km.
- A magnitude 6.0 earthquake struck off the coast of Coquimbo, Chile on April 15 with a depth of 20 km.
- (Solomon Islands) A magnitude 6.1 earthquake struck the Santa Cruz Islands on April 17 at a depth of 16 km.
- A magnitude 6.2 earthquake struck off the west coast of Northern Sumatra, Indonesia on April 19 at a depth of 17 km.
- A magnitude 7.6 earthquake struck Koryak Okrug, Russia on April 20 at a depth of 22 km. At least 40 people were injured and villages of Apuka, Khailino and Vyvenka were destroyed. Some buildings and water supply systems badly damaged in the Korf-Tilichiki area.
- In late April 2006 large aftershocks struck Koryak Okrug, Russia. Among them were a magnitude 6.1 on April 20 (depth 10 km), a magnitude 6.1 on April 21 (depth 9 km), a magnitude 6.0 on April 21 (depth 12 km), and the largest being a magnitude 6.6 on April 29 with a depth of 11 km.
- (Australia) A mining accident happened in a mine near Beaconsfield, Tasmania on April 25. This left one miner dead and two others trapped for two weeks. There had been an earthquake with magnitude 2.2 at the time.
- A magnitude 6.3 earthquake struck Nias, Indonesia on April 25 with a depth of 21 km.
- (Australia) A magnitude 6.1 earthquake struck in the ocean west of Macquarie Island on April 26 with a depth of 10 km.
- A magnitude 6.1 earthquake struck Vanuatu on April 30 with a depth of 128 km.
- Two large earthquakes struck off the coast of Atacama, Chile within 2 1/2 hours on April 30. The magnitudes were 6.6 and 6.5 and both had a depth of 12 km.
- A magnitude 6.0 earthquake struck Tonga on April 30 with a depth of 10 km.

=== May ===
May
- Strongest: 8.0 M_{w}, Tonga
- Total fatalities: 5,749

Number by magnitude
- 8.0–8.9: 1
- 7.0–7.9: 1
- 6.0–6.9: 10
- 5.0–5.9: 180

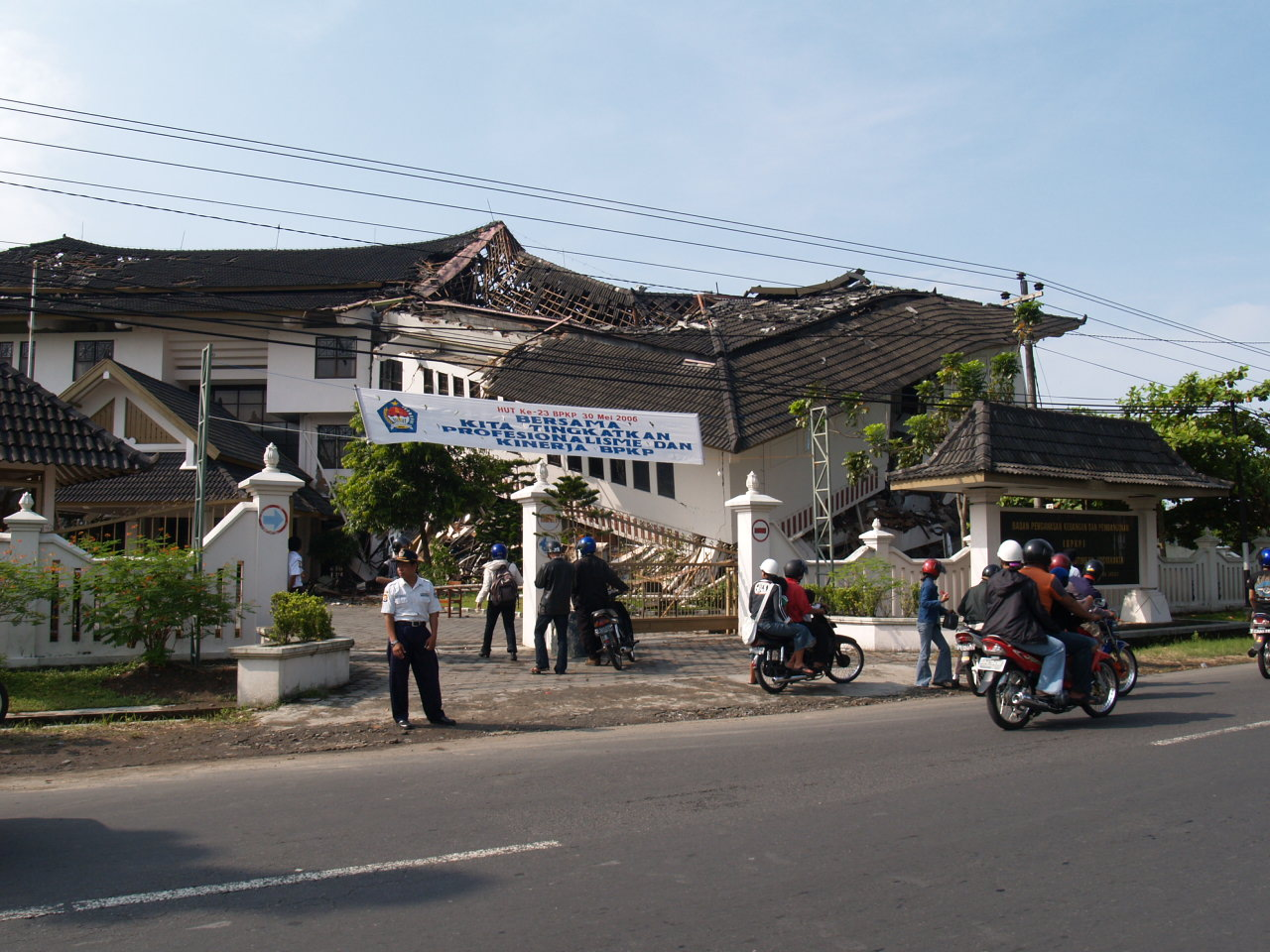
The collapse of a house in Indonesia due to the earthquake.

- A magnitude 8.0 earthquake struck Tonga on May 3 with a depth of 55 km. One person was injured, a church was damaged, windows were broken and items knocked from shelves at Nukuʻalofa. A tsunami was observed at many locations around the Pacific.
- A magnitude 5.0 earthquake struck Kerman Province, Iran on May 7 at a depth of 14 km. More than 70 people were injured and some buildings and roads damaged in the Zarand area.
- A magnitude 6.1 earthquake struck the Mid-Indian Ridge on May 7 at a depth of 10 km.
- A magnitude 6.4 earthquake struck the Fox Islands region of Alaska on May 10 at a depth of 18 km.
- A magnitude 7.4 earthquake struck the Kermadec Islands, New Zealand on May 16 at a depth of 152 km.
- A magnitude 6.8 earthquake struck Nias, Indonesia on May 16 at a depth of 12 km.
- A magnitude 6.3 earthquake struck the Molucca Sea, Indonesia on May 19 at a depth of 35 km.
- A magnitude 6.0 earthquake struck in the Pacific off the coast of Ecuador on May 21 at a depth of 10 km.
- A magnitude 6.6 earthquake struck Koryak Okrug, Russia on May 22 at a depth of 19 km. This was one of the largest aftershocks of the April 20th mainshock.
- A magnitude 6.2 earthquake struck the Kamchatka Peninsula of Russia on May 22 at a depth of 197 km.
- A magnitude 6.1 earthquake struck the Banda Sea, Indonesia on May 22 at a depth of 3 km.
- A magnitude 6.3 earthquake struck Java, Indonesia on May 26 at a depth of 13 km. At least 5,749 people were killed, 38,568 were injured and as many as 600,000 people were displaced in the Yogyakarta area. More than 127,000 houses were destroyed and an additional 451,000 were damaged in the area, with the total loss estimated at 3.1 billion U.S. dollars. This was the deadliest earthquake of 2006.
- A magnitude 6.5 earthquake struck New Britain, Papua New Guinea on May 28 at a depth of 34 km.

=== June ===
June
- Strongest: 6.5 M_{w}, Alaska
- Total fatalities: 2

Number by magnitude
- 6.0–6.9: 13
- 5.0–5.9: 109

- A magnitude 6.0 earthquake struck Fiji on June 2 at a depth of 592 km.
- A magnitude 5.1 earthquake struck Qeshm, Hormozgan Province, Iran on June 3 at a depth of 12 km. 2 people were killed and 4 injured on Qeshm. Some buildings were damaged at Ramkan.
- A magnitude 6.0 earthquake struck the Central Mid-Atlantic Ridge on June 5 at a depth of 10 km.
- A magnitude 6.1 earthquake struck Fiji on June 9 at a depth of 564 km, one struck from getting the depth.
- A magnitude 6.3 earthquake struck Kyushu, Japan on June 11 at a depth of 140 km. At least eight people injured in Miyazaki Prefecture, Kyushu; Ehime Prefecture, Shikoku; and Hiroshima and Yamaguchi Prefectures, Honshu.
- A magnitude 4.5 earthquake struck Gjirokaster County, Albania on June 13 at a depth of 10 km. One person was slightly injured and 12 homes were damaged at Tepelene.
- A magnitude 6.5 earthquake followed shortly afterwards by a magnitude 6.0 aftershock struck the Rat Islands, Alaska on June 14. The mainshock had a depth of 14 km and the aftershock 29 km.
- A magnitude 6.0 earthquake struck the Northern Mid-Atlantic Ridge on June 18 at a depth of 9 km.
- A magnitude 4.9 earthquake struck Gansu, China on June 20 at a depth of 24 km. Five people injured in Gansu. Twenty-five houses damaged at Xinsi. At least six buildings damaged at the Linjiang and Liping. Two landslides damaged the road between Wen Xian and Wudu Counties same.
- A magnitude 6.0 earthquake struck the Nicobar Islands, India on June 21 at a depth of 16 km.
- A magnitude 6.0 earthquake struck the Kuril Islands, Russia on June 22 at a depth of 95 km.
- A magnitude 6.3 earthquake struck Sulawesi, Indonesia on June 24 at a depth of 26 km.
- A magnitude 6.2 earthquake struck the Rat Islands, Alaska on June 27 at a depth of 17 km.
- A magnitude 6.2 earthquake struck Fiji on June 27 at a depth of 570 km.
- A magnitude 6.3 earthquake struck the Nicobar Islands, India on June 27 at a depth of 20 km.
- A magnitude 5.8 earthquake struck Qeshm, Hormozgan Province, Iran on June 28 at a depth of 11 km. 9 people were injured and power cuts occurred on Jazireh-ye Qeshm.

=== July ===
July
- Strongest: 7.7 M_{w}, Indonesia
- Total fatalities: 755

Number by magnitude
- 7.0–7.9: 1
- 6.0–6.9: 8
- 5.0–5.9: 219

- A magnitude 6.0 earthquake struck Tonga on July 7 at a depth of 35 km.
- A magnitude 6.6 earthquake struck the Andreanof Islands, Alaska on July 8 at a depth of 22 km.
- A magnitude 6.2 earthquake struck off the coast of Atacama, Chile on July 16 at a depth of 10 km.
- A magnitude 7.7 earthquake struck south of Java, Indonesia on July 17 at a depth of 20 km. This tsunami earthquake had a maximum Mercalli intensity of IV (Light) but the large tsunami that followed caused significant damage. Around seven-hundred were killed and thousands were injured.
- Many large aftershocks followed the Java earthquake. Two of the bigger aftershocks struck on July 17 with magnitudes of 6.0 and 6.1. The depths were 6 km and 20 km respectively.
- A magnitude 6.1 earthquake struck the Sunda Strait, Indonesia on July 19 at a depth of 45 km.
- A magnitude 6.4 earthquake struck New Britain, Papua New Guinea on July 19 at a depth of 28 km.
- A magnitude 4.9 earthquake struck Yunnan, China on July 22 at a depth of 56 km. 22 people were killed and 106 injured due to a landslide in Yanjin County.
- A magnitude 6.3 earthquake struck Nias, Indonesia on July 27 at a depth of 20 km.
- A magnitude 5.6 earthquake struck Khatlon Province, Tajikistan on July 29 at a depth of 34 km. 3 people killed, 19 injured, 1,083 houses destroyed, 1,500 damaged and power outages occurred in the Panj-Qumsangir area.

=== August ===
August
- Strongest: 7.0 M_{w}, Scotia Sea
- Total fatalities: 1

Number by magnitude
- 7.0–7.9: 1
- 6.0–6.9: 7
- 5.0–5.9: 137

- A magnitude 6.8 earthquake struck Vanuatu on August 7 at a depth of 150 km.
- A magnitude 6.0 earthquake struck Michoacan, Mexico on August 11 at a depth of 56 km.
- A magnitude 6.2 earthquake struck Simeulue, Indonesia on August 11 at a depth of 22 km.
- A magnitude 6.1 earthquake struck Fiji on August 15 at a depth of 154 km.
- A magnitude 6.0 earthquake struck the Kuril Islands, Russia on August 20 at a depth of 26 km.
- A magnitude 7.0 earthquake struck the Scotia Sea on August 20 at a depth of 13 km.
- A magnitude 6.5 earthquake struck off the east coast of Kamchatka, Russia on August 24 at a depth of 43 km.
- A magnitude 6.6 earthquake struck Salta, Argentina on August 25 at a depth of 184 km.
- A magnitude 5.0 earthquake struck Sichuan, China on August 25 at a depth of 22 km. At least 1 person killed, 31 injured, buildings destroyed and landslides damaged roads in the Doushaguan-Yanjin area.

=== September ===
September
- Strongest: 6.9 M_{w}, Samoa
- Total fatalities: 1

Number by magnitude
- 6.0–6.9: 11
- 5.0–5.9: 101

- A magnitude 6.7 earthquake struck Bougainville, Papua New Guinea on September 1 at a depth of 38 km. Items knocked from shelves and roads cracked at Buin.
- A magnitude 6.3 earthquake struck the Flores Sea, Indonesia on September 9 at a depth of 572 km.
- A magnitude 5.9 earthquake struck the Gulf Of Mexico on September 10 at a depth of 14 km.
- A magnitude 6.3 earthquake struck Seram, Indonesia on September 16 at a depth of 17 km.
- A magnitude 6.2 earthquake struck San Juan Province, Argentina on September 17 at a depth of 137 km.
- A magnitude 6.0 earthquake struck south of Java, Indonesia on September 21 at a depth of 25 km.
- A magnitude 6.0 earthquake struck Santiago del Estero Province, Argentina on September 22 at a depth of 598 km.
- A magnitude 6.9 earthquake struck Samoa on September 28 at a depth of 28 km.
- (Trinidad and Tobago) A magnitude 6.1 earthquake struck off the coast of Sucre, Venezuela on September 29 at a depth of 53 km. Three people were injured in the Port-of-Spain area. One building destroyed and one was damaged at California. Several buildings damaged on Tobago and in parts of northern Trinidad, including minor damage to buildings at Port-of-Spain. Power outages occurred in northern and eastern Trinidad and parts of Tobago.
- A magnitude 5.5 aftershock struck Trinidad and Tobago on September 29 at a depth of 52 km. One person was killed at Gasparillo.
- A magnitude 6.0 earthquake struck the Arequipa Region of Peru on September 30 at a depth of 107 km.
- A magnitude 6.6 earthquake struck the Kuril Islands, Russia on September 30 at a depth of 11 km. Minutes later a magnitude 6.0 aftershock struck with a depth of 10 km.

=== October ===
October
- Strongest: 6.7 M_{w}, Hawaii, Papua New Guinea, Peru
- Total fatalities: 0

Number by magnitude
- 6.0–6.9: 14
- 5.0–5.9: 151

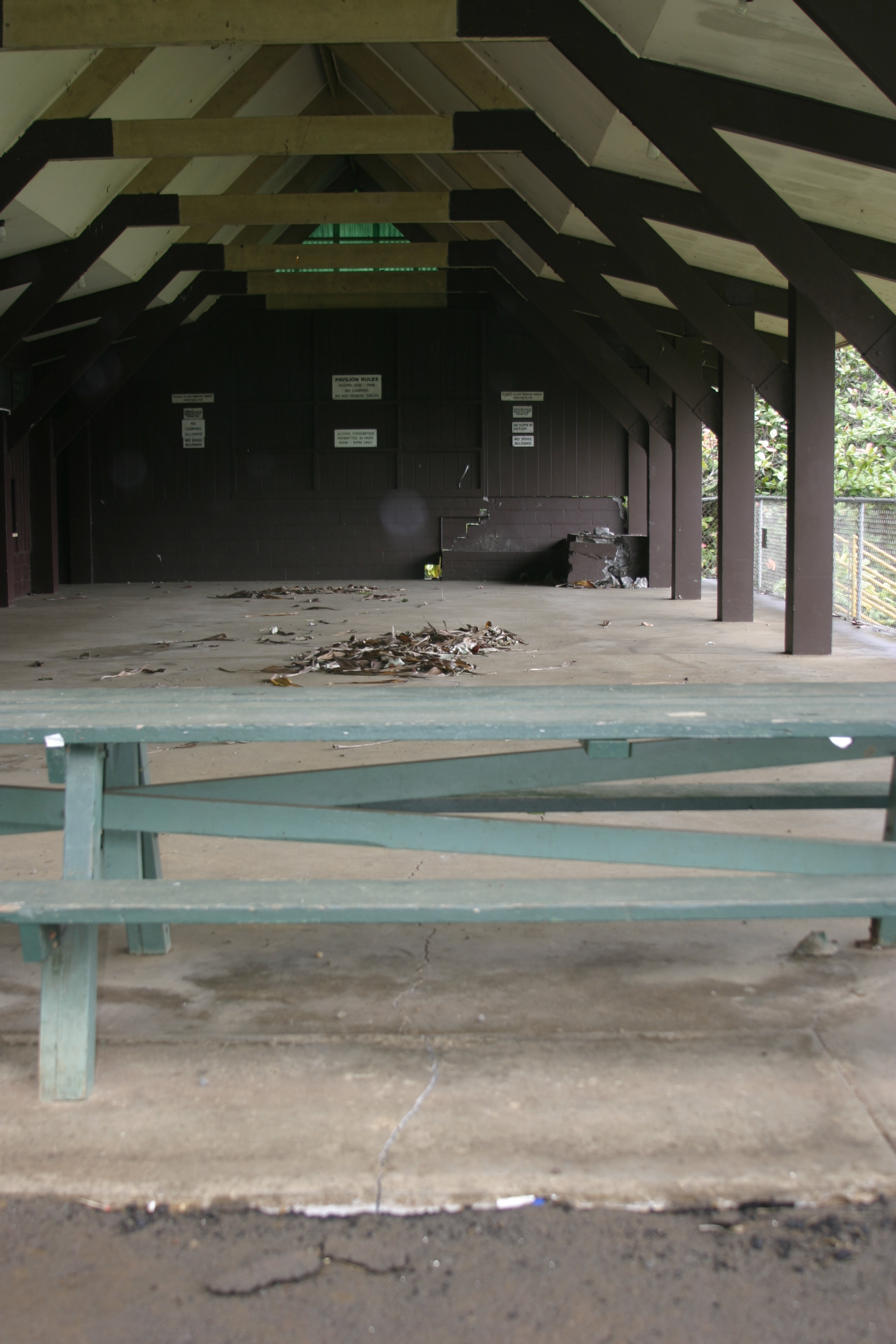
Damage to the Keokea Beach Park pavilion in Hawaii.

- A magnitude 6.5 earthquake struck the Kuril Islands, Russia on October 1 at a depth of 19 km.
- A magnitude 6.3 earthquake struck beneath Erromango, Vanuatu on October 3 at a depth of 161 km.
- A magnitude 4.4 earthquake struck Balochistan, Pakistan on October 9 at a depth of 10 km. At least three people injured in Chaman.
- A magnitude 6.3 earthquake struck to the north of Luzon, Philippines on October 9 at a depth of 14 km.
- A magnitude 6.0 earthquake struck the southern East Pacific Rise on October 10 at a depth of 10 km.
- A magnitude 6.0 earthquake struck off the east coast of Honshu, Japan on October 10 at a depth of 9 km.
- A magnitude 6.3 earthquake struck Coquimbo, Chile on October 12 at a depth of 31 km.
- A magnitude 6.7 earthquake struck Hawaii on October 15 at a depth of 39 km. Numerous people suffered minor injuries, at least 1,173 buildings damaged, roads damaged and landslides blocked roads on Hawai`i. Power outages occurred throughout the Hawaiian Islands. Damage estimated at 73 million dollars. A large magnitude 6.0 aftershock struck minutes later.
- A magnitude 6.7 earthquake struck New Britain, Papua New Guinea on October 17 at a depth of 32 km.
- A magnitude 6.3 earthquake struck Vanuatu on October 18 at a depth of 115 km.
- A magnitude 6.7 earthquake struck off the coast of Ica Region, Peru on October 20 at a depth of 23 km. Minor damage to some houses at Pisco.
- A magnitude 6.0 earthquake struck the southeast Mid-Indian Ridge on October 22 at a depth of 10 km.
- A magnitude 6.4 earthquake struck the Izu Islands, Japan on October 23 at a depth of 11 km.
- A magnitude 6.0 earthquake struck off the coast of Ica Region, Peru on October 26 at a depth of 28 km.

=== November ===
November
- Strongest: 8.3 M_{w}, Russia
- Total fatalities: 0

Number by magnitude
- 8.0–8.9: 1
- 7.0–7.9: 0
- 6.0–6.9: 19
- 5.0–5.9: 229

- A magnitude 6.0 earthquake struck the mainland of Papua New Guinea on November 6 at a depth of 111 km.
- A magnitude 6.5 earthquake struck New Britain, Papua New Guinea on November 7 at a depth of 11 km.
- A magnitude 6.2 earthquake struck New Britain, Papua New Guinea on November 12 at a depth of 12 km.
- A magnitude 6.8 earthquake struck Santiago del Estero Province, Argentina on November 13 at a depth of 572 km.
- A magnitude 6.2 earthquake struck New Britain, Papua New Guinea on November 13 at a depth of 11 km.
- A magnitude 6.1 earthquake struck the Banda Sea, Indonesia on November 14 at a depth of 345 km.
- A magnitude 8.3 earthquake struck the Kuril Islands, Russia on November 15 at a depth of 10 km. One person injured at Waikiki by a tsunami with a recorded wave height of 34 cm at Honolulu, Hawaii. One parking lot was flooded at Nawiliwili, Hawaii by a tsunami with a recorded wave height of 88 cm. Two docks were destroyed and at least one was damaged at Crescent City, California by a tsunami with a recorded wave height of 176 cm. This was the largest earthquake of 2006.
- Following the above event were many large aftershocks. At least 7 measured 6.0+ with the largest being a magnitude 6.7 on November 15.
- A magnitude 6.1 earthquake struck the southeast Mid-Indian Ridge on November 16 at a depth of 10 km.
- A magnitude 6.2 earthquake struck the Ryukyu Islands, Japan on November 17 at a depth of 22 km.
- A magnitude 6.1 earthquake struck the central East Pacific Rise on November 19 at a depth of 16 km.
- A magnitude 6.2 earthquake struck Halmahera, Indonesia on November 29 at a depth of 39 km.
- A magnitude 6.0 earthquake struck Tonga on November 30 at a depth of 13 km.
- A magnitude 6.2 earthquake struck the Pacific-Antarctic Ridge on November 30 at a depth of 12 km.

=== December ===
December
- Strongest: 7.0 M_{w}, Taiwan
- Total fatalities: 9

Number by magnitude
- 7.0–7.9: 1
- 6.0–6.9: 10
- 5.0–5.9: 118

- A magnitude 6.3 earthquake struck northern Sumatra, Indonesia on December 1 at a depth of 204 km.
- A magnitude 6.3 earthquake struck Sumbawa, Indonesia on December 1 at a depth of 19 km. One person died of a heart attack, 14 people injured and at least 20 houses destroyed and many damaged at Bima.
- A magnitude 6.0 earthquake struck Guatemala on December 3 at a depth of 61 km.
- A magnitude 6.4 earthquake struck the Kuril Islands, Russia on December 7 at a depth of 16 km.
- (Indonesia) A magnitude 6.3 earthquake struck the Celebes Sea on December 12 at a depth of 214 km.
- A magnitude 5.8 earthquake struck northern Sumatra, Indonesia on December 17 at a depth of 30 km. Seven people killed, 100 injured and more than 680 homes damaged or destroyed in the Muarasipongi area. Landslides reported in the Muarasipongi district.
- A magnitude 6.2 earthquake struck the Andaman Islands, India on December 22 at a depth of 24 km.
- A magnitude 7.0 earthquake struck just south of Taiwan on December 26 at a depth of 23 km. Two people killed, over forty injured and several buildings damaged or destroyed. Undersea telecommunication cables were cut, disrupting voice and internet communication in much of East and Southeast Asia. Minutes later another strong earthquake of magnitude 6.9 struck the area. This can be considered an example of a doublet earthquake.
- A magnitude 6.0 earthquake struck the Kuril Islands, Russia on December 26 at a depth of 38 km.
- A magnitude 6.0 earthquake struck Bougainville Island, Papua New Guinea on December 27 at a depth of 355 km.
- A magnitude 6.6 earthquake struck the Gulf of Aden on December 30 at a depth of 15 km.

== See also ==
- List of 21st-century earthquakes
