= 2006 Greece earthquake =

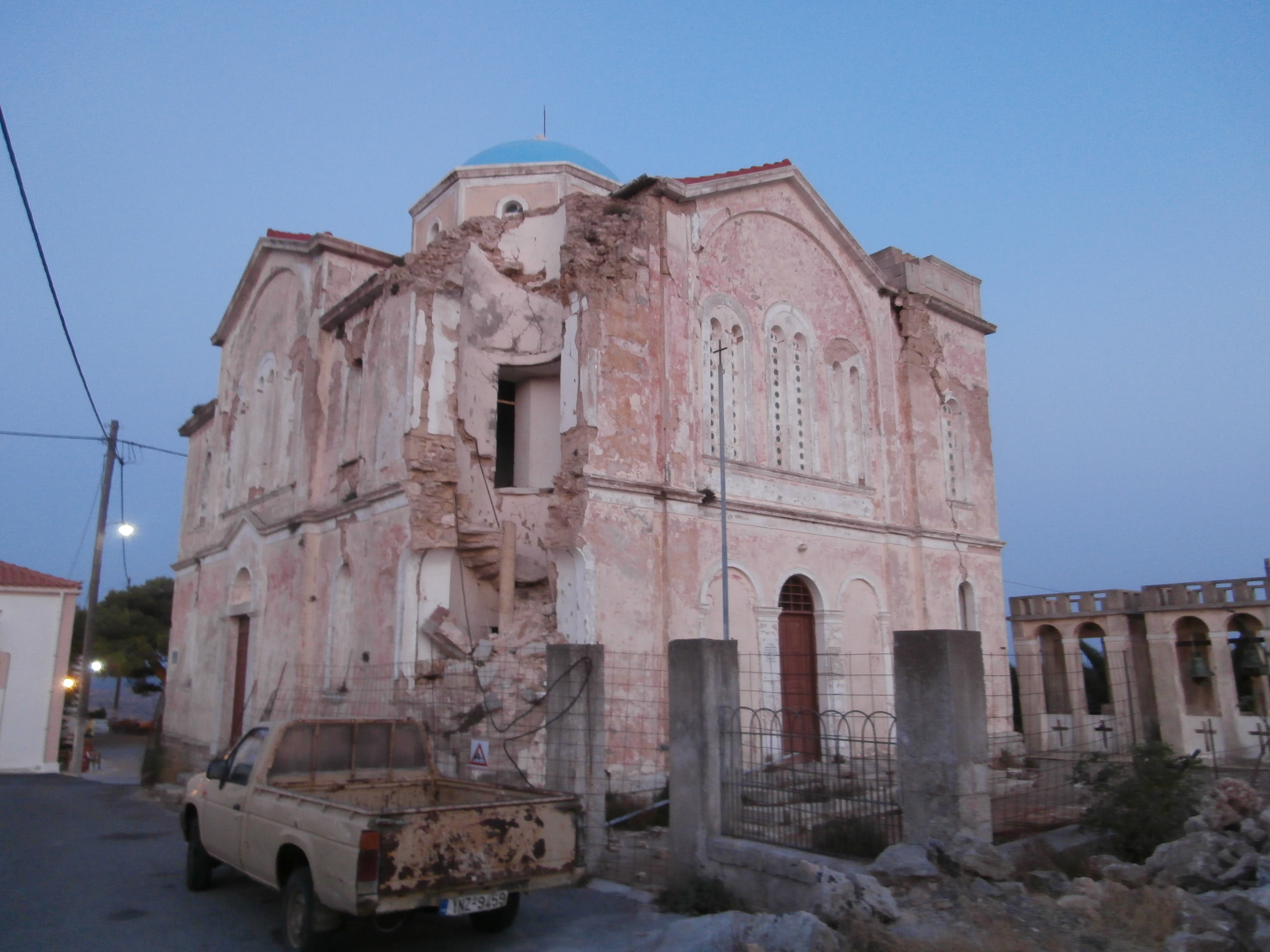
- The main church of Mitata, Kythira, after the earthquake

- Location within Greece
- UTC time: 2006-01-08 11:34:54
- ISC event: 8012175
- USGS-ANSS: ComCat
- Local date: 8 January 2006
- Local time: 13:34:53
- Magnitude: 6.7 M_{w}
- Depth: 55.0 km (34.2 mi)
- Epicenter: 36.26°N 23.46°E
- Type: Oblique-slip
- Areas affected: Greece
- Max. intensity: MMI VIII (Severe)
- Casualties: 3 injured

The 2006 Greece earthquake – also known as the Kythira earthquake – occurred on January 8 at 13:34:53 local time and was felt throughout the entire eastern Mediterranean basin. The earthquake an M_{w} magnitude 6.7 and a maximum Mercalli intensity of VII (Very strong). Its epicentre was located just off the island of Kythira about 200 kilometres (120 mi) south of Athens.

One person was injured and a number of buildings and roads in Kythira were heavily damaged as a result. Several older houses on the island completely collapsed while the central square of the village of Mitata partially fell into the valley as a result of a subsequent landslide. Few buildings were damaged on the mainland closest to the epicentre (Cape Malea). On the island of Crete, two people were slightly injured in their attempt to abandon their homes. Damage to 146 buildings was recorded in western Crete, including the old town hall of Chania, the third Venetian arsenal, nine schools and many of the houses in the old Venetian town center.

Nevertheless, despite the magnitude and the duration of the tremor (buildings in Athens swayed for almost 40 seconds) no other significant injury or damage was reported in the country's strongest earthquake in decades. This was mainly because the quake had a focal depth of approximately 55 kilometres (34 mi). The tremor was felt as far away as in Bari on the Adriatic Sea, Naples and much of southern Italy, Malta, Cairo and even along the Lebanese, Syrian and Israeli shorelines. No tsunami was associated with this event.

== See also ==
- List of earthquakes in 2006
- List of earthquakes in Greece
