= Badan Rehabilitasi dan Rekonstruksi =

Logo of BRR

Badan Rehabilitasi dan Rekonstruksi (BRR) NAD-Nias, or Agency for the Rehabilitation and Reconstruction of Aceh and Nias, was an Indonesian government agency which coordinated and jointly implemented the recovery programme following the December 2004 Indian Ocean earthquake and tsunami that mostly affected Aceh and the March 2005 Nias–Simeulue earthquake.

BRR was established by the president of Indonesia, Susilo Bambang Yudhoyono on 16 April 2005. The agency operated for a four-year period, based in Banda Aceh, with a regional office in Nias and a representative office in Jakarta. Ex Indonesia Ministry, a Stanford alumnus Kuntoro Mangkusubroto was appointed to lead BRR, in coordination with recovery community. He subsequently (late 2014) recalled some aspects of the work of the BRR while he was in Aceh saying that "I am happy and proud that physical reconstruction has been achieved according to expectations. In fact in some sectors, beyond expectation."

The recovery programme in Aceh and Nias is regarded as one of the largest humanitarian programmes in history.

The agency's mission is to restore livelihoods and strengthen communities in Aceh and Nias by designing and overseeing a coordinated, community-driven reconstruction and development program implemented according to the highest professional standards.

With nearly 653 funding agencies and 564 implementing partners responding to the 2004 Indian Ocean earthquake and tsunami and 2005 Nias–Simeulue earthquake, the possibility of overlapping projects was very high. BRR was needed to ensure reconstruction program is effective, duplication is minimized, and that donor funds are used optimally, as well as important role of local community input and participation in the reconstruction effort.

The programme involved up to 20,000 projects implemented by hundreds of organisations, including local and national government institutions, multilateral and bilateral agencies, and national and international NGOs, along with thousands of volunteers and other participants from all around the world.

The initial damage and loss assessment for Aceh was US$4.5 billion, and for Nias US$400 million. These assessments combined with a fluctuating inflation rate and an estimated US$1.5 billion for upgrading neglected facilities within these regions, raised the total funding required for the reconstruction to more than US$7 billion.

The response from the national and international communities was unprecedented, with a total of US$7.2 billion pledged and nearly US$7 billion committed which, based on recent calculations, translates to an approximate 93% realisation of aid funding.

The BRR Knowledge Centre (KNOW) is dedicated to the preservation of data and management of information related to the rehabilitation and reconstruction programme in Aceh and Nias (2005–09). KNOW was established by BRR in June 2008 through support from the Multi Donor Fund and in partnership with UNDP. Its principal activities include the collection, cataloguing and classification of documents and other media formats and to enable this information to be accessed for research and reference purposes.
