= 2018 Balikpapan oil spill =

Damaged offshore oil pipeline in Indonesia

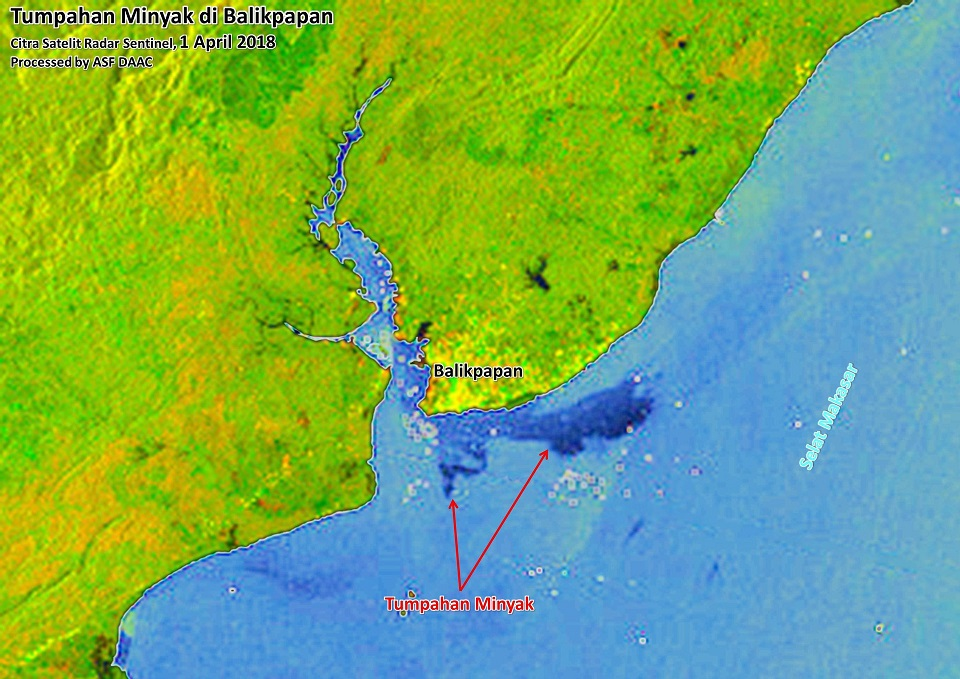
- Satellite imagery of the spill on 1 April 2018
- Location: Balikpapan, East Kalimantan, Indonesia
- Coordinates: 1°12′52″S 116°47′10″E
- Date: 31 March 2018

Cause
- Cause: Burst underwater pipeline
- Casualties: 5 killed
- Operator: Pertamina

Spill characteristics
- Area: 200 km^{2} (77 sq mi)

The 2018 Balikpapan oil spill was an oil spill off the coast from the city of Balikpapan, Indonesia. It was caused by a cracked pipeline linked to a Pertamina refinery in the city.

A blaze that occurred when the oil spill caught on fire had killed five residents who were in the bay, in addition to causing respiratory problems in the city.

== Location ==
The spill occurred in Balikpapan Bay, on the coast of which the Pertamina Refinery Unit V is located. Balikpapan, which sits on the bay, is an energy and mining hub on the island and is populated by over 700,000 people.

== Causes ==
Initially, Pertamina denied responsibility for the spill for four days, claiming that tests showed the oil originated from marine shipments and that divers sent had not discovered any leakage on their pipelines. Instead, the company claimed that the oil originated from MV Ever Judger, a Panama-flagged bulk carrier carrying coal to Malaysia. However, on 5 April, it admitted responsibility, adding that it discovered that the oil samples were crude oil and not marine fuel oil after its 10th sample.

According to Pertamina in an April 4 statement, a distribution pipeline carrying crude oil from a terminal in Lawe-Lawe, Penajam North Paser to Balikpapan which was installed in 1998 burst, having been displaced by 120 meters from its original position. The leaked pipeline was located at a depth of 25 meters, with a diameter of 20 inches and a thickness of 12 millimeters. Officials claimed that an anchor dropped by of a coal ship flying a Panamianian flag dragged the pipe, although it did not name the ship. Pertamina denied any negligence in the spill, adding that the pipe had been inspected as recently as December 2017.

== Mitigation ==
During initial attempts on 31 March, some of the oil spill caught on fire with the blaze reaching as high as 2 kilometres (1.2 miles). Five people were killed when the oil spill caught on fire. According to a local search and rescue worker, the flame was sparked in an attempt to clear the spill by burning it. Director-general of oil and gas Djoko Siswanto stated that they suspected the ship dragging the pipeline had caught on fire, hence igniting the spill.

According to the Ministry of Environment and Forestry, about 70 cubic meters of spilled oil have been contained by night on 3 April.

Environmental organizations and campaigners criticized the Indonesian government for its slow response, with Greenpeace claiming it had not received any information from the authorities on the fifth day of the spill.

The city's residents participated in the cleanup, using simple equipment such as buckets to scoop oil from the local beaches.

== Effects ==
Balikpapan city secretary Sayid MN Fadli described that the bay was "like a gas station". The city itself declared a state of emergency, with over 1,000 people reporting nausea and breathing problems due to the smoke caused by a fire on the spill. Pertamina released a statement declaring that the operations of its refinery, which processes 260,000 barrels of crude oil daily, is unaffected.

Head of the People's Representative Council Bambang Soesatyo demanded an explanation from the Embassy of China in Jakarta, regarding a theory that the fire on the Ever Judger resulted in the blaze and hence fatalities.

On 20 April, Pertamina's Chief Executive Elia Massa Manik was removed from his position. Among other factors, the oil spill incident was quoted as one of the reasons for the dismissal.

=== Casualties and losses ===
Five people were killed when their ship was trapped in the blaze caused by the oil catching on fire. Two of the bodies were discovered immediately afterwards, with two more being discovered on the third day and the last the following day. The victims had rented a boat to fish around the bay. All victims were residents of the city.

The MV Ever Judger was also caught in the blaze, with its inflatable life raft and the rope binding it to the ship igniting. Its crew of 20 Chinese nationals were evacuated with 1 suffering from burns. While the ship, which carried more than 70,000 tons of coal, did not catch on fire fully, ship's port side was severely damaged.

Indonesian vice-minister of energy and mineral resources Arcandra Tahar stated that the pipeline damage may cause up to 200,000 barrels per day in lost production. Pertamina stated that the crude oil flow was diverted to a smaller, 16-inch pipe, although it confirmed the loss of some production in the refinery.

=== Environmental damage ===
At least 34 hectares of mangrove swamps were covered in the spill. A dead endangered Irrawaddy dolphin washed up to the city's beach, seemingly poisoned by the oil spill. Environmental and oceanographical experts have expressed concerns of long-lasting damages to the oceanic ecosystem including coral reefs and seagrass.

Due to the spill, the Ministry of Maritime Affairs and Fisheries received reports of oil pollution across the country, such as in the Bay of Jakarta and in Bintan.
