= Pasirpanjang, Indonesia =

Village in Central Java, Indonesia

Coordinates: 7°7′40″S 108°48′13″E

Pasirpanjang (Indonesian pronunciation: [pasɪrˈpaɲd͡ʒaŋ]) is a village in Brebes, Central Java, Indonesia. It is located at the foot of a mountain.

== 2018 landslide ==
In February 2018 the village was struck by a large channelised landslide which killed eighteen people who were in the streets and working in mountainside fields. Seven bodies were never recovered.
