= 2006 Pangandaran earthquake and tsunami =

Destructive tsunami earthquake south of Java Island

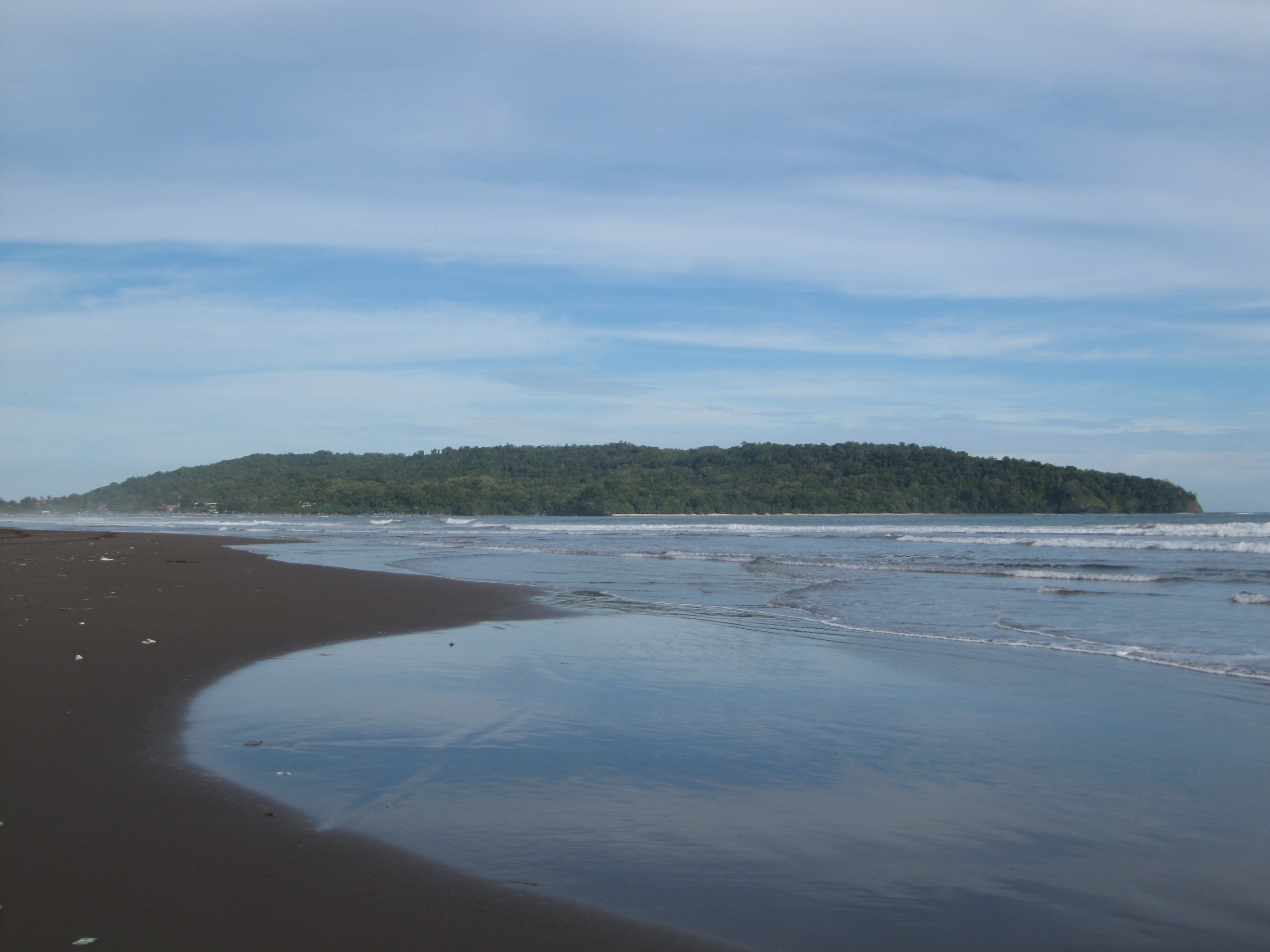
- The beach and peninsula encompassing Pangandaran National Park

- UTC time: 2006-07-17 08:19:26
- ISC event: 10699442
- USGS-ANSS: ComCat
- Local date: July 17, 2006
- Local time: 15:19 local time (WIB (Indonesia Western Standard Time))
- Duration: 185 seconds
- Magnitude: 7.7 M_{w}
- Depth: 25.3 km (15.7 mi)
- Epicenter: 9.33°S 107.32°E
- Type: Thrust
- Areas affected: Southern Java, Indonesia
- Total damage: $44.7 million
- Max. intensity: MMI IV (Light)
- Tsunami: 5–7 metres (16–23 ft), locally up to 21 metres (69 ft)
- Casualties: 668 dead, 9,299 injured, 65 missing

An earthquake occurred on July 17, 2006, at 15:19:27 local time along a subduction zone off the coast of west and central Java, a large and densely populated island in the Indonesian archipelago. The shock had a moment magnitude of 7.7 and a maximum perceived intensity of IV (Light) in Jakarta, the capital and largest city of Indonesia. There were no direct effects of the earthquake's shaking due to its low intensity, and the large loss of life from the event was due to the resulting tsunami, which inundated a 300 km (190 mi) portion of the Java coast that had been unaffected by the earlier 2004 Indian Ocean earthquake and tsunami that was off the coast of Sumatra. The July 2006 earthquake was also centered in the Indian Ocean, 180 kilometers (110 mi) from the coast of Java, and had a duration of more than three minutes.

An abnormally slow rupture at the Sunda Trench and a tsunami that was unusually strong relative to the size of the earthquake were both factors that led to it being categorized as a tsunami earthquake. Several thousand kilometers to the southeast, surges of several meters were observed in northwestern Australia, but in Java the tsunami runups (height above normal sea level) were typically 5–7 meters (16–23 ft) and resulted in the deaths of more than 600 people. Other factors may have contributed to exceptionally high peak runups of 10–21 m (33–69 ft) on the small and mostly uninhabited island of Nusa Kambangan, just to the east of the resort town of Pangandaran, where damage was heavy and a large loss of life occurred. Since the shock was felt with only moderate intensity well inland, and even less so at the shore, the surge arrived with little or no warning. Other factors contributed to the tsunami being largely undetected until it was too late, and although a tsunami watch was posted by an American tsunami warning center and a Japanese meteorological center, no information was delivered to people at the coast.

== Tectonic setting ==
The island of Java is the most densely populated island on Earth, and is vulnerable to both large earthquakes and volcanic eruptions, due to its location near the Sunda Trench, a convergent plate boundary where the Australian tectonic plate is subducting beneath Indonesia. Three great earthquakes occurred in the span of three years to the northwest on the Sumatra portion of the trench. The 2004 M9.15 Sumatra–Andaman, the 2005 M8.7 Nias–Simeulue, and the 2007 M8.4 Mentawai earthquakes produced the largest release of elastic strain energy since the 1957/1964 series of shocks on the Aleutian/Alaska Trench.

The southeastern (Java) portion of the Sunda Trench extends from the Sunda Strait in the west to Bali Basin in the east. The convergence of relatively old oceanic crust is occurring at a rate of 6 centimeters (2.4 in) per year in the west portion and 4.9 cm (1.9 in) per year in the east, and the dip of the Benioff Zone (the angle of the zone of seismicity that defines the down-going slab at a convergent boundary) is around 50° and extends to a depth of approximately 600 kilometers (370 mi). Pre-instrumental events were the large to very large events of 1840, 1867, and 1875, but unlike the northwestern Sumatra segment, no megathrust earthquake has occurred on the Java segment of the Sunda Trench in the last 300 years.

== Earthquake ==
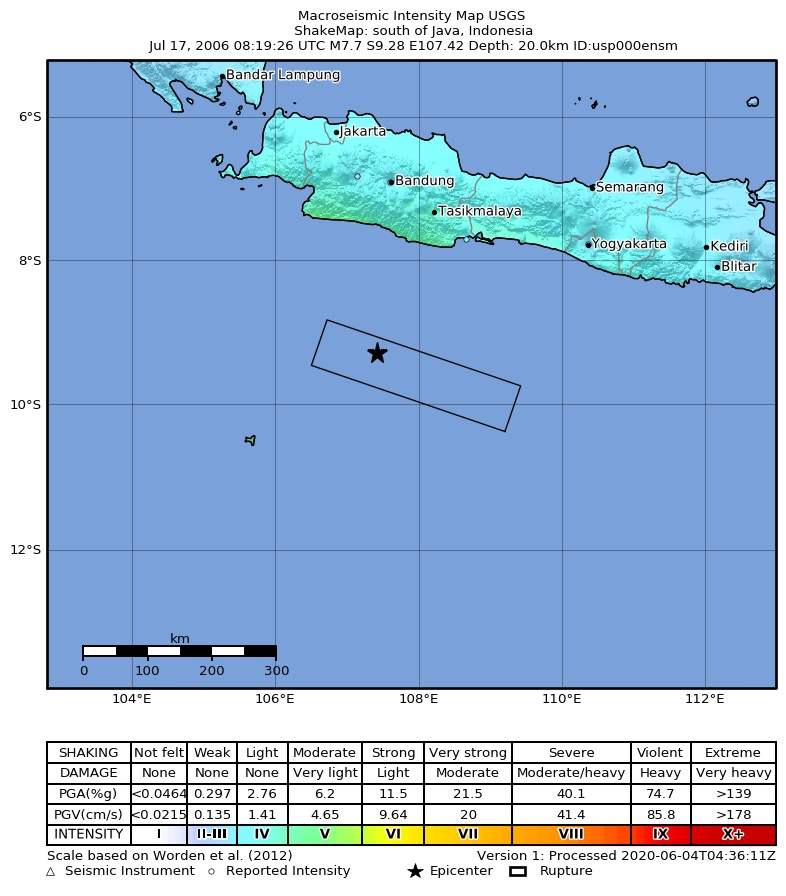
USGS ShakeMap showing the relatively light to moderate intensity on the island

The earthquake was the result of thrust faulting at the Sunda Trench. A rupture length of approximately 200 kilometers (120 mi) (and an unusually low rupture velocity of 1–1.5 km (0.62–0.93 mi) per second) resulted in a duration of about 185 seconds (just over three minutes) for the event. The shock was centered 50 kilometers (31 mi) from the trench, and about 180 kilometers (110 mi) from the south coast of the island. A comparison was made with the earlier 2002 Sumatra earthquake, a M7.5 submarine earthquake of a similar size that also occurred along the Sunda Arc and at a shallow depth, but one that did not result in a tsunami.

The large and damaging tsunami that was generated was out of proportion relative to the size of the event, based on its short-period body wave magnitude. The Indonesian Meteorological, Climatological, and Geophysical Agency assigned a magnitude of 6.8, and the United States Geological Survey (USGS) reported a similar value of 6.1 (both body wave magnitude) that were calculated from short-period seismic waves (1–2 seconds in the case of the USGS). The USGS then presented a moment magnitude of 7.2 that was calculated from 5–100-second surface waves, and Harvard University subsequently revealed that a moment magnitude of 7.7 had been resolved based on even longer 150-second surface waves.

=== Intensity ===
In tsunami prone regions, strong earthquakes serve as familiar warnings, and this is especially true for earthquakes in Indonesia. Previous estimates of the tsunami hazard for the Java coastline may have minimized the risk to the area, and to the northwest along the Sumatran coast, the risk is substantially higher for tsunami, especially near Padang. Previous events along the coast of Java in 1921 and again in 1994 illustrate the need for an accurate assessment of the threat. The July 2006 earthquake had an unusually slow rupture velocity which resulted in minor shaking on land for around three minutes, but the intensity was very light relative to the size of the tsunami that followed.

The earthquake produced shaking at Pangandaran (where the M6.3 2006 Yogyakarta earthquake was felt more strongly) of intensity III–IV (Weak–Light), intensity III at Cianjur, and II (Weak) at Yogyakarta. Further inland and farther from the epicenter, intensity IV shaking made tall buildings sway in Jakarta, but at some coastal villages where many of the casualties occurred, the shaking was not felt as strong. An informal survey of 67 people that were present at the time revealed that in at least eight cases, individuals stated that they did not feel the earthquake at all (a typical M7.7 earthquake would have been distinctly noticed at those distances). The unusually low felt intensities, along with the short period body wave magnitudes, were components of the event that narrowed its classification into that of a tsunami earthquake.

=== Type ===
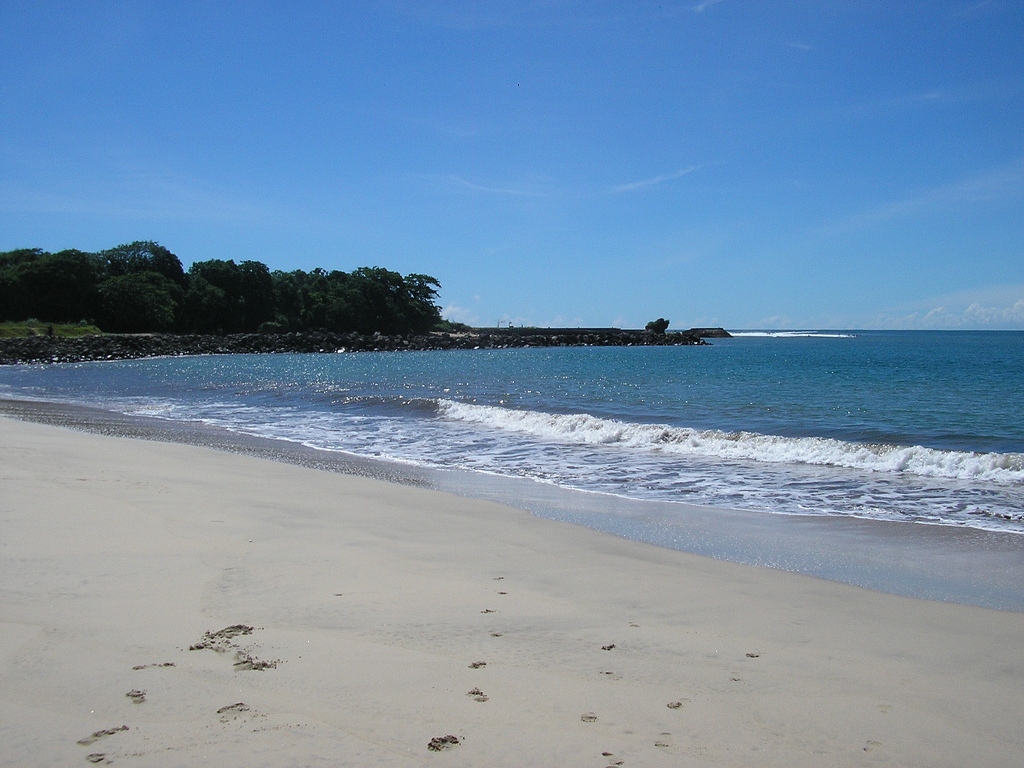
A tsunami surge of 5.98 m (19.6 ft) occurred near Pameungpeuk (2008 image)

Tsunami earthquakes can be influenced by both the presence of (and lack of) sediment at the subduction zone, and can be categorized as either aftershocks of megathrust earthquakes, like the M7 June 22, 1932 Cuyutlán event in Mexico, or as standalone events that occur near the upper portion of a plate interface. Northwestern University professor Emile Okal imparts that in the aftershock scenario, they can occur as a result of stress transfer from a mainshock to an accretionary wedge or a similar environment with "deficient mechanical properties", and as standalone events they can occur in the presence of irregular contacts at the plate interface in a zone that lacks sediment.

One of the initial characterizations of tsunami earthquakes came from seismologist Hiroo Kanamori in the early 1970s, and additional clarity materialized following the 1992 Nicaragua earthquake and tsunami, which was evaluated to have a surface-wave magnitude of 7.0 when analyzing short period seismic signals. When longer period signals of around 250 seconds were investigated, the shock was reevaluated to have a moment magnitude of 7.6, with a hypothesis that the slow nature of the slip of the event may have concealed its substantial extent. Sediment was thought to have contributed to a slower rupture, due to a lubrication effect at the plate interface, with the result being an earthquake signature that had abundant long period seismic signals, which could be an important factor in the tsunami-generation process.

=== Warning ===
A tsunami warning system was not in operation at the time of the shock, but the Pacific Tsunami Warning Center (operated by the National Oceanic and Atmospheric Administration in Hawaii) and the Japan Meteorological Agency posted a tsunami watch, based on the occurrence of a M7.2 earthquake. The bulletin came within 30 minutes of the shock, but there was no means to transmit the warning to the people on the coast that needed to know. Many of those who felt the earthquake responded by moving away from the shore, but not with any urgency. The withdrawal of the sea that exposed an additional 5–10 meters (16–33 ft) of beach created an even more significant warning sign, but in some locations wind waves on the sea effectively concealed the withdrawal that signalled the approach of the tsunami.

== Tsunami ==
The earthquake and tsunami came on a Monday afternoon, a day after many more people were present on the beach, due to a major national holiday. The waves came a few tens of minutes after the shock (and were a surprise, even to lifeguards) and occurred when the sea level was approaching low tide which, along with the wind waves, masked the initial withdrawal of the sea as the tsunami drew near. Most portions of the south Java coast saw runup heights of 5–7 meters (16–23 ft), but evidence on the island of Nusa Kambangan indicated that a peak surge measuring 21 meters (69 ft) had occurred there, suggesting to researchers that the possibility of a submarine landslide had contributed to the magnitude of the tsunami in that area.

=== Runup ===
Tsunami surge heights
Location	Coordinates	Height
Dara Payung	7°41′53″S 109°15′51″E	7.39 m (24.2 ft)
Bulak Laut	7°41′01″S 108°36′43″E	7.38 m (24.2 ft)
Pameungpeuk	7°40′5″S 107°41′26″E	5.98 m (19.6 ft)
Batu Hiu	7°41′31″S 108°32′09″E	5.44 m (17.8 ft)
Pangandaran	7°41′37″S 108°39′06″E	4.27 m (14.0 ft)
Sindongkarta	7°45′52″S 108°3′35″E	3.95 m (13.0 ft)
Kato et al. 2007, p. 1,057

A 300 km (190 mi) portion of the southwest and south-central Java coast was affected by the tsunami, and resulted in around 600 fatalities, with a high concentration in Pangandaran. Two thousand kilometers (1,200 miles) to the southeast at the Steep Point area of western Australia, a runup of 2 m (6 ft 7 in) was measured, which was comparable to a similar runup in northern Oman from the 2004 Indian Ocean earthquake and tsunami, though in that case it was at a much greater distance of 5,000 kilometers (3,100 mi). Within three weeks of the event, scientists from five different countries were on the ground in Java performing a survey of the affected areas, including gathering runup (height above normal sea level) and inundation (distance the surge moved inland from the shore) measurements.

The island of Nusa Kambangan (30 km × 4 km (18.6 mi × 2.5 mi)) sits on the south coast of Java and is separated from the main island by a narrow strait. It is a large and mostly uninhabited nature reserve, and is referred to as the Alcatraz of Indonesia, due to the three high security prisons that are located at the town of Permisan. Of all the measurements taken during the post-tsunami survey, the highest runup heights (10–21 m (33–69 ft)) were seen on the island behind a beach, where hibiscus and pandanus plants, and large coconut trees were mangled and uprooted up to 1,500 m (4,900 ft) from the shore. The (sea floor) bathymetry in the area supported a proposition that a canyon slope failure or an underwater landslide may have contributed to or focused the tsunami energy at that location. Nineteen farmers and one prisoner were killed there, but the deep water port of Cilacap (just to the east) was protected by the island, although one large moored vessel made ground contact during the initial 1.5 m (4 ft 11 in) withdrawal.

=== Damage ===
Since the earthquake caused only minor ground movement, and was only lightly felt, all the damage that occurred on the island was due to the tsunami. Types of buildings that were affected were timber/bamboo, brick traditional, and brick traditional with reinforced concrete. Semi-permanent timber or bamboo structures that were based on a wooden frame were the most economical style of construction that were assessed following the disaster. A tsunami flow depth of 2 m (6 ft 7 in) usually resulted in complete destruction of these types of structures. A group of scientists that evaluated the damage considered the unreinforced brick construction as weak, because the performance of homes constructed in that style did not fare much better than the timber/bamboo variety. Hotels and some houses and shops that were of reinforced brick construction were far better off, because units that were exposed to a flood depth of 3–4 meters (9.8–13.1 ft) were considered repairable.

Many wooden cafes and shops within 20 meters (66 ft) of the shore were completely removed by the tsunami at Pangandaran, and severe damage still occurred to unreinforced masonry that was within several hundred meters, but some hotels that were constructed well held up better. The villages of Batu Hiu and Batu Kara, both to the west of Pangandaran, experienced similar damage. Other severe damage was seen at Marsawah village, Bulakbenda, where all buildings had been removed down to their foundation within 150 meters (490 ft) of the water line, and even 300–500 m (980–1,640 ft) further inland there were many buildings that were totally destroyed. Witnesses reported that waves were breaking several hundred meters inland at that location.

=== Response ===
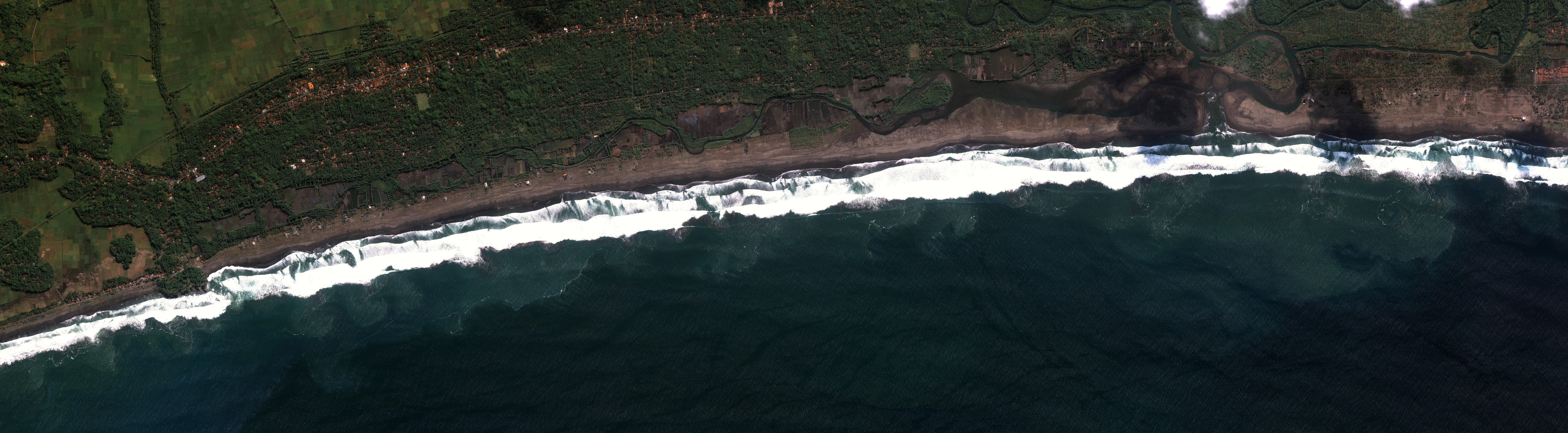
A July 19 satellite image of the Pangandaran coast showing tsunami debris

Officials in Indonesia received information regarding the tsunami in the form of bulletins from the Pacific Tsunami Warning Center and the Japan Meteorological Agency, but wanted to avoid panic, and did not attempt to disseminate the advisories to the public. Virtually no time was available to make that sort of effort (had the intention been to communicate the danger with the public) because some community leaders were sent text messages with pertinent information only minutes prior to the arrival of the first waves. The tsunami affected the coast of Java comprising mostly fishing villages and beach resorts that were unscathed following the 2004 Indian Ocean tsunami, and was also only several hundred kilometers distant from the region that saw heavy destruction just several months prior during the 2006 Yogyakarta earthquake.

Trained research teams were already on the ground on Java responding to the May earthquake and began a survey of more than one hundred Muslim farmers, plantation laborers, and fishermen (or those with fishing-related occupations) that were affected by the tsunami. Almost two thirds of the group reported that they lived in permanent structures made of wood, brick, or cement, while the remainder lived in semi-permanent facilities made from earth or stone. The government was cited as the first responder for water, relocation and medical assistance, and helping with the deceased. For rescue, shelter, clothing, and locating missing people, individuals were listed as the primary provider, but 100% of those surveyed replied that the government should be responsible for relief. Most of those requiring aid stated that they were given effective assistance within 48 hours and that they were satisfied with the help.

== See also ==
- List of earthquakes in 2006
- List of earthquakes in Indonesia
