= 2006 Yogyakarta earthquake =

Earthquake in Java, Indonesia

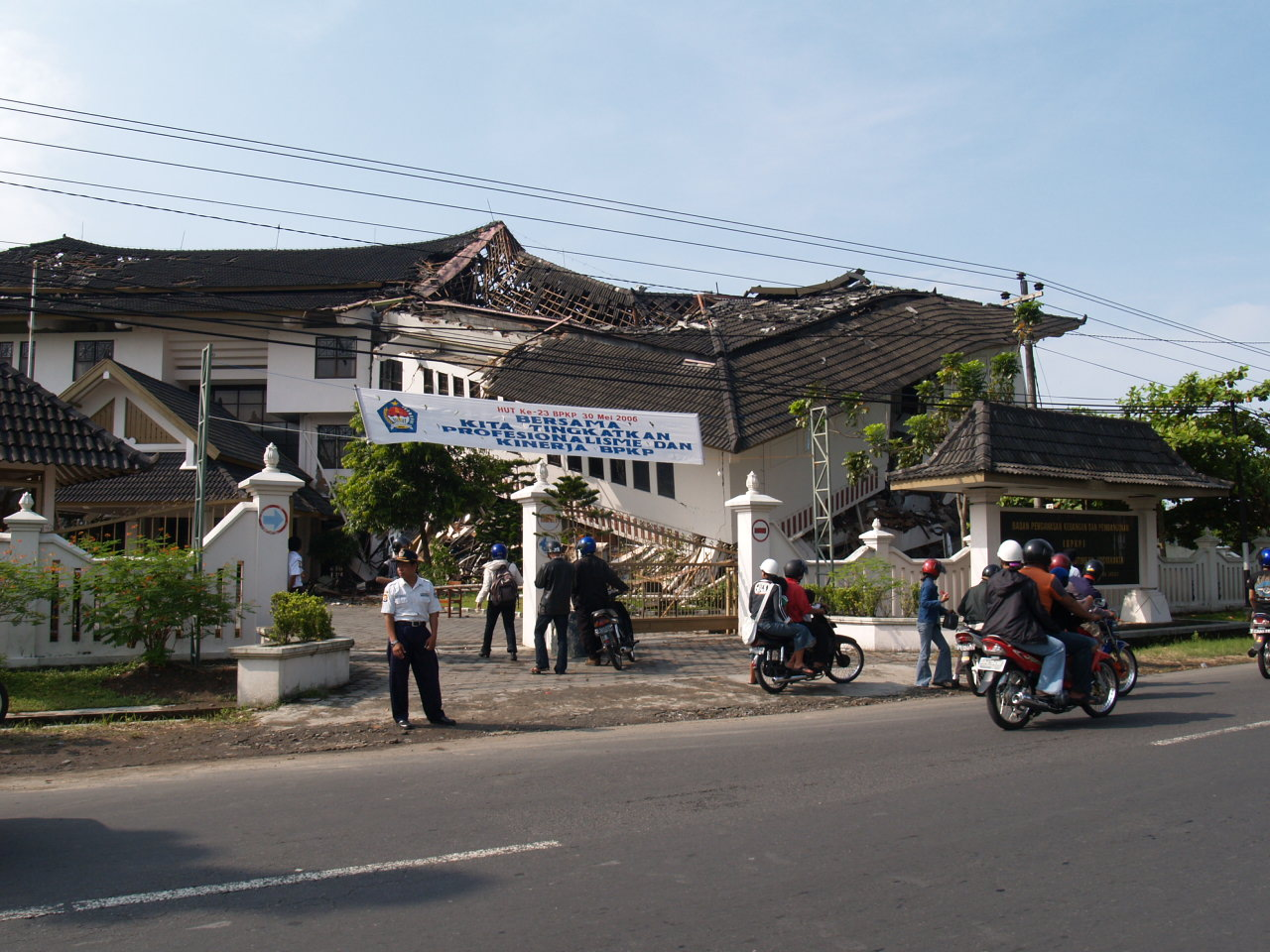

- Location within Java
- UTC time: 2006-05-26 22:53:58
- ISC event: 8358516
- USGS-ANSS: ComCat
- Local date: 27 May 2006; 20 years ago
- Local time: 05:53 WIB (Indonesia Western Standard Time)
- Magnitude: 6.4 M_{w}
- Depth: 15 km (9 mi)
- Epicenter: 7.961°S 110.446°E; Bantul Regency
- Type: Strike-slip
- Areas affected: Yogyakarta Special Region; Java, Indonesia
- Total damage: Extreme
- Max. intensity: MMI IX (MSK-64 VIII)
- Peak acceleration: 0.336 g
- Casualties: 5,749–5,778 dead 38,568–137,883 injured 600,000–699,295 displaced

The 2006 Yogyakarta earthquake (also known as the Bantul earthquake) occurred at 05:53 local time on 27 May with a moment magnitude of 6.4 and a maximum MSK intensity of VIII (Damaging) in the Yogyakarta region of Java, Indonesia.

Several factors led to a disproportionate amount of damage and number of casualties for the size of the shock, with more than 5,700 dead, tens of thousands injured, and financial losses of Rp 29.1 trillion ($3.1 billion). With limited effects on public infrastructure and lifelines, housing and private businesses bore the majority of damage (the 9th-century Prambanan Hindu temple compound was also affected), and the United States' National Geophysical Data Center classified the total damage from the event as extreme. Although Indonesia experiences very large thrust earthquakes offshore at the Sunda Trench, this was a large strike-slip event that occurred on the southern coast of Java near the city of Yogyakarta. Mount Merapi lies nearby, and during its many previous historical eruptions, large volume lahars and volcanic debris flowed down its slopes where settlements were later built. This unconsolidated material from the stratovolcano amplified the intensity of the shaking and created the conditions for soil liquefaction to occur. Inadequate construction techniques and poor quality materials contributed to major failures with unreinforced masonry buildings (then the most prevalent type of home construction), though other styles fared better.

== Tectonic setting ==
The islands of Indonesia constitute an island arc that is one of the world's most seismically active regions, with high velocity plate movement at the Sunda Trench (up to 60 mm (2.4 in) per year), and considerable threats from earthquakes, volcanic eruptions, and tsunami throughout. Java, one of the five largest in the Indonesian archipelago, lies on the Sunda Shelf to the north of the Sunda Trench, which is a convergent plate boundary where the Indo-Australian plate is being subducted under the Eurasian plate. The subduction zone offshore Java is characterized by a northward dipping Benioff zone, frequent earthquakes and volcanic activity that influence the regional geography, and direct or indirect stress transfer that has affected the various onshore faults. Sedimentation is closely related to tectonics, and while the volume of offshore sediment at the trench decreases with distance from the Ganges-Brahmaputra Delta at the Bay of Bengal, the onshore accrual of sediments near the Special Region of Yogyakarta has been shaped by tectonic events.

== Earthquake ==
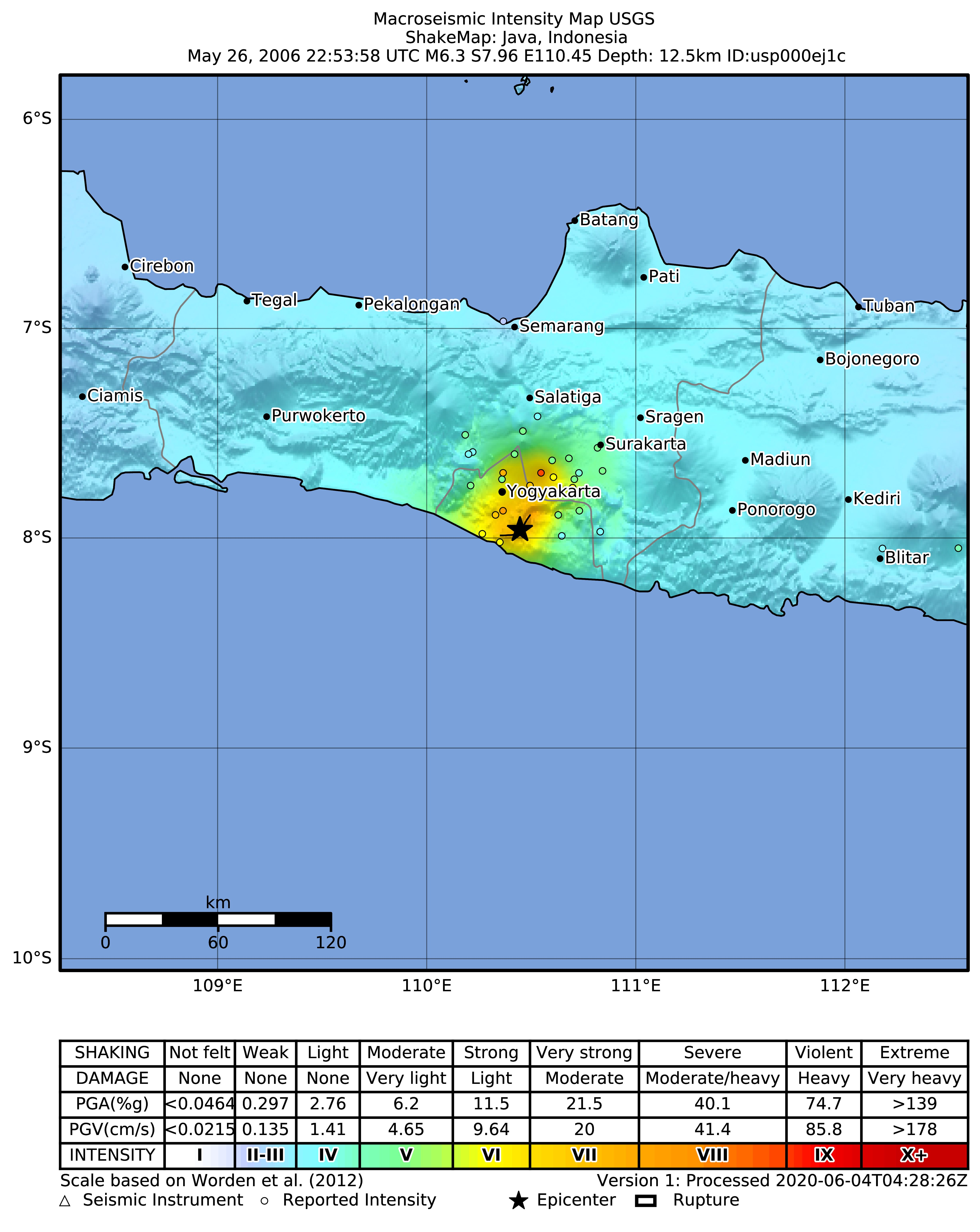
USGS ShakeMap for the mainshock

According to the United States Geological Survey (USGS), the shock occurred 20 km (12 mi) south-southeast of Yogyakarta at a depth of 10 km (6.2 mi), but other institutions provided source parameters (location and depth) that were not in agreement. No information was present on the extent of the faulting or the direction of propagation and there was no link to the eruption of Mount Merapi. The USGS suggested that the focal mechanism was most likely associated with left-lateral slip on a NE trending strike-slip fault, as that is the orientation of the Opak Fault, but this has not been validated. No surface breaks were documented, but the location of the greatest damage that was caused does align with the Opak Fault as a possible source.

A group of Japanese and Indonesian scientists visited the area in March 2007 and confirmed the lack of surface ruptures, and pointed out that any visible expression of the fault would likely have been rapidly destroyed due to the tropical climate, and have acknowledged the widely varying locations (and the preference for the Opak Fault) that were reported by the various seismological institutions. Their investigation resulted in a different scenario, with an unknown or newly formed NE trending fault as the origin of the shock. Evidence for one of the proposed faults was found in the form of alignment of portions of the Oyo River near the USGS' epicenter, which is parallel (N°65E) to the Nglipar fault in the Gunungkidul region. If the shock occurred in this area it could indicate the reactivation of a major fault system. The second proposed fault further to the east is nearly parallel to the Ngalang and Kembang faults that lie to the north of the Oyo River.

=== InSAR analysis ===
While the densely populated area that saw significant destruction is adjacent to the Opak River Fault, both the USGS and Harvard University placed the epicenter to the east of that fault. Few seismometers were operating in the region, but a group of temporary units that were set up following the mainshock recorded a number of aftershocks that were east of the Opak River Fault and were aligned along a 20 km (12 mi) zone striking N°50E. Due to the ambiguous nature of the available information on the source of the Yogyakarta earthquake, a separate group of Japanese and Indonesian scientists applied one of the first uses of interferometric synthetic aperture radar to determine the source fault. Several data sets (one captured in April 2006 and another post-earthquake batch from June) were collected from an instrument on board the Advanced Land Observation Satellite and were compared to each other to show potential ground deformation patterns.

A lack of any dislocation found on the images along the Opak River fault made evident the lack of movement along that fault, and though the aftershocks were occurring at a depth of 8–15 km (5.0–9.3 mi), the deformation was distinct at the surface. The observed ground deformation that was detailed by the differential satellite images and Global Positioning System measurements was roughly 10 km (6.2 mi) east of (and parallel to) the Opak River Fault, along a zone that passed through the USGS' epicenter, and delineated a NE trending vertical fault (a dip of 89°). The displacements were not more than 10 cm (3.9 in) and indicated left-lateral strike-slip motion as well as a component of reverse slip, and to the west of the Opak River Fault (and closer to the areas of damage) strong ground motion triggered subsidence of volcanic deposits from Mount Merapi.

=== Strong motion ===
In 2006, Mount Merapi had not been active for more than four years, but on May 11 a pyroclastic flow triggered the evacuation of more than 20,000 people from the northern sector of Yogyakarta. While authorities expected a larger eruption to follow, the earthquake occurred instead. The volcano's previous eruptions deposited loosely bound sedimentary material in the valley during lahar flows and this material was found to have played a significant role in the effects of the shock. For example, German and Indonesian scientists set up instruments at several locations situated on different soil types to measure aftershocks. Of nine events that were analyzed, it was found that the station at Imogiri (a heavily affected village that was built on 150–200 meters (490–660 ft) of sediment) showed signs of local amplification when compared to a location that was built on bedrock, and that the deposits amplified the impact of the shallow crustal rupture.

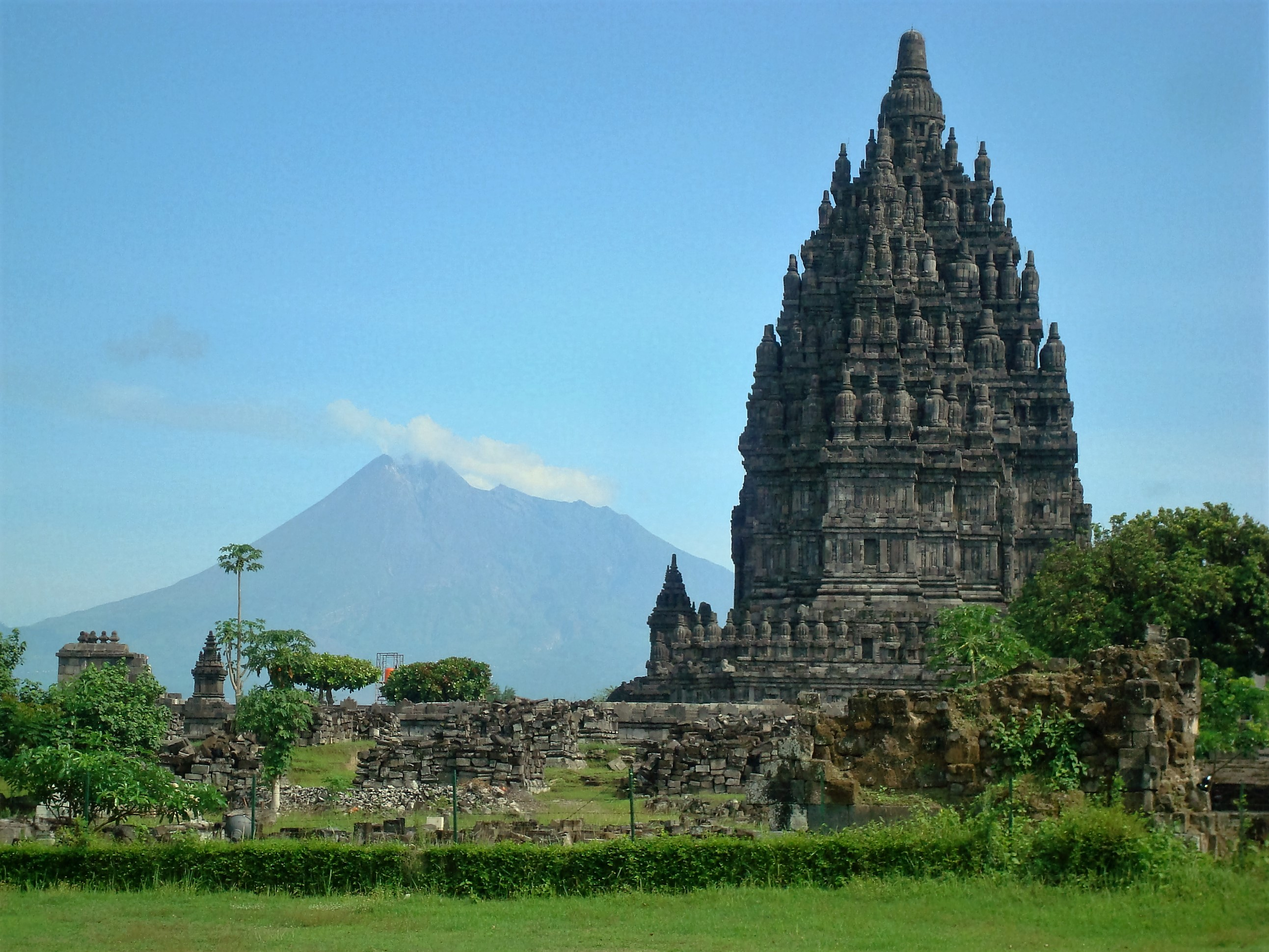
The volcano with Prambanan

=== Liquefaction ===
A separate post-event study looked at the relationship with the layer of sediment and the occurrence of soil liquefaction during earthquakes near Bantul. Researchers stated that the Yogyakarta region is seismically active, with four known events in the 19th century and three in the 20th century, with peak ground acceleration values of 0.038–0.531g. The type and properties of sediment control the occurrence and distribution of liquefaction, and other environmental conditions (like the water table) also play a part, as well as the peak ground acceleration of the earthquake. The Bantul-Klaten plain consists of alluvium (sand, silt, clay, and gravel) and volcanic deposits from Merapi (sand, agglomerates, tuff, and ash), as well as limestone and sandstone. Borehole and magnetic data surveys show that the alluvium and lahar deposits at the Bantul graben are 20–200 meters (66–656 ft) thick and at places over 200 meters, and the water table is 0.6–5 meters (2 ft 0 in – 16 ft 5 in) below ground level. Most liquefaction events took place near the 2.5 km (1.6 mi) wide Opak Fault zone. Sand boils, lateral spreading, settling, and slides led to some tilting and collapse of buildings.

== Damage ==
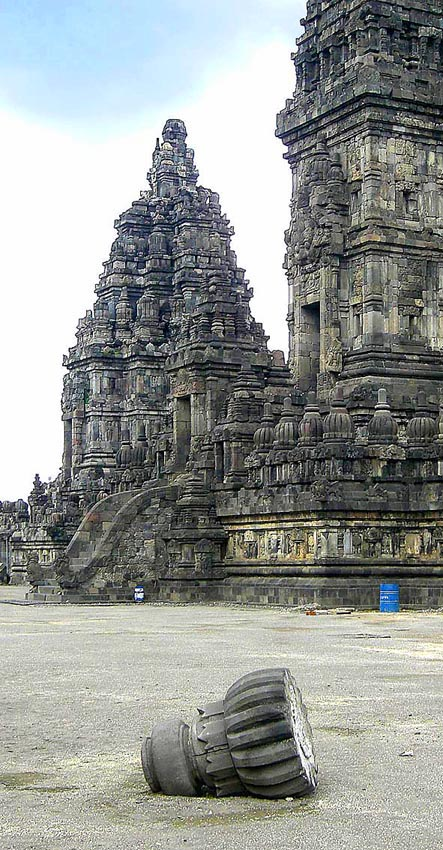
A fallen pinnacle from the damaged Prambanan temple

Altogether, eleven densely populated districts comprising 8.3 million people were affected, but the regencies of Bantul, Sleman, Gunung Kidul, Kulon Progo, Klaten, and the city of Yogyakarta were especially hard hit. More than 5,700 people were killed in the early morning shock, with tens of thousands injured, and hundreds of thousands made homeless. Total financial losses from the event are estimated to be Rp 29.1 trillion ($3.1 billion), with 90% of the damage affecting the private sector (homes and private businesses) and only 10% affecting the public sector. The damage to housing accounted for about half of the total losses and a comparison was made to the damage to homes in Aceh following the 2004 Indian Ocean earthquake and tsunami. Damage in central Java was more pronounced because of the substandard construction practices and the high population density, but on the other end of the scale, damage to infrastructure was very limited.

=== Housing ===
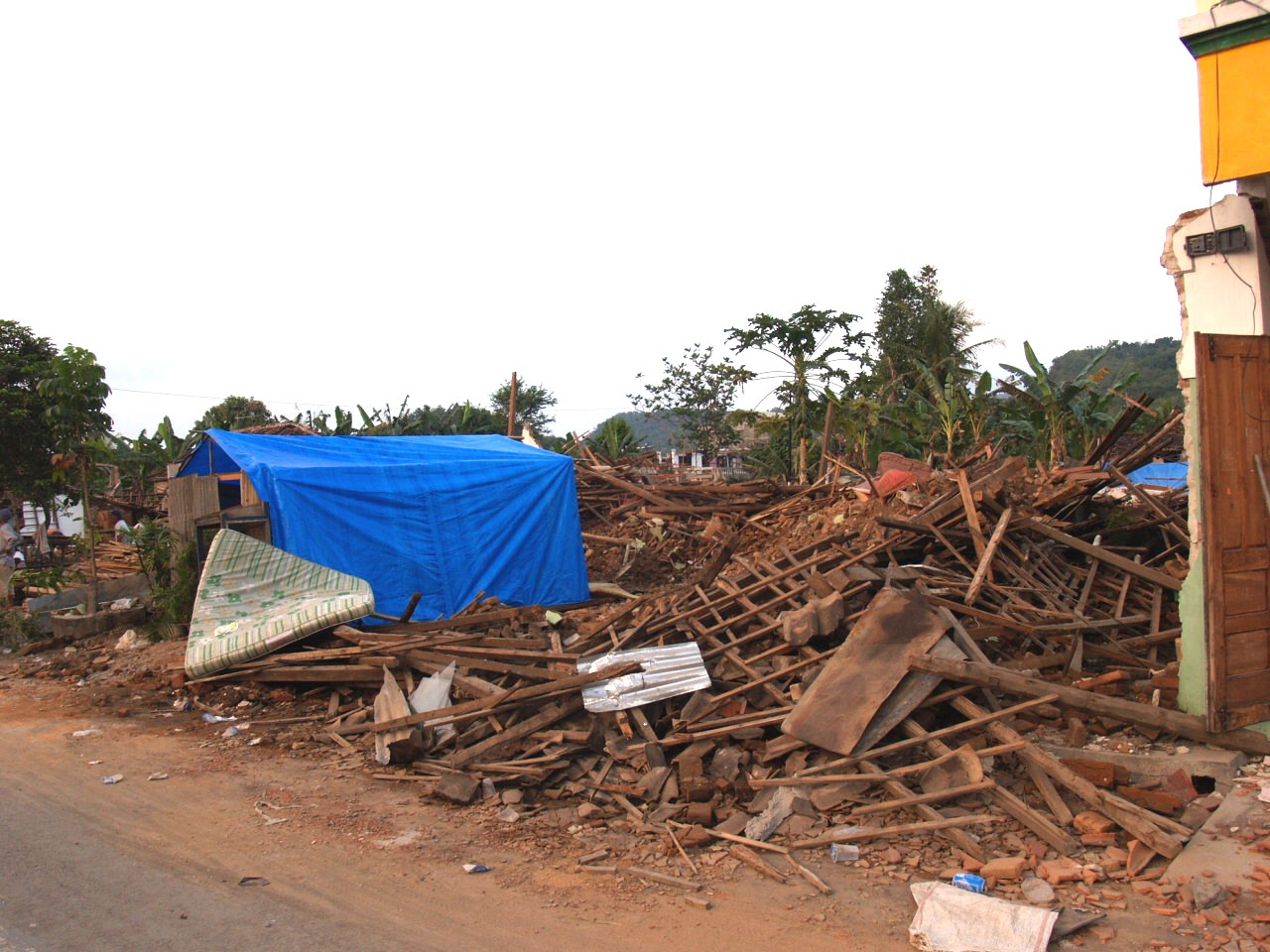
House damage in Bantul Regency

With 154,000 houses destroyed and 260,000 units experiencing damage, the event was one of the most costly natural disasters in the previous ten years. With 7% of housing units lost, more houses were damaged than during the 2004 Sumatra–Andaman and the 2005 Nias–Simuele events combined. With 66,000 homes destroyed, the Klaten District saw the heaviest damage, followed by Bantul, with 47,000 destroyed. In the most heavily damaged areas, 70–90% of units were destroyed, contributing to a total of 4.1 million cubic meters of debris. Of the three home construction styles used in the area, the most common type fared badly. Low quality materials and improper construction styles led to unreinforced masonry buildings being responsible for the large loss of life and the high number of injuries. The Earthquake Engineering Research Institute stated that there was a "lack of wall integrity in the transverse direction for out-of-plane forces" and "no mechanical connection between the top of the wall and the roof or floor, and inadequate out-of-plane strength due to a lack of reinforcement".

=== Prambanan ===
The Prambanan Temple Compounds (also known as the Roro Jonggrang Temple) was constructed near the border of Yogyakarta and Central Java in 856, and was abandoned shortly thereafter. The site, which has experienced about 16 earthquakes since the 9th-century (including the 2006 event), consists of three yards of varying sizes with different stone block temples, and was rediscovered by a Dutch explorer in 1733. The smallest yard (110 m^{2}) houses the main temple, and a slightly larger yard (220 m^{2}) houses the Perwara temple. The main Prambanan Temple Complex is housed in the largest yard (390 m^{2}). Many stones were dislodged and some parts broke off during the earthquake, and civil engineers were brought in to investigate the characteristics of the soil under the temple using ground penetrating radar, bore samples, and standard penetration tests. The goal was to visually examine the soil layers, to determine soil bearing capacity and depth of groundwater, as well as the depth of bedrock. Recommendations were then made regarding the renovations and repair process.

== International aid ==
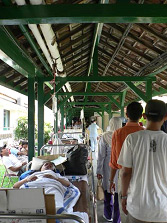
Patients being treated at a hospital in Yogyakarta.

Many countries and organizations offered foreign aid to the devastated region, but the actual amounts delivered/received often varied from these figures, as in the case of other disasters.

- Japan promised US$10 million, sent two medical teams and also announced that it will send troops to help out
- The United Kingdom offered four million pounds (US$7,436,800)
- Saudi Arabia promised US$5 million, plus food, medical equipment and tents, while the United Arab Emirates and Kuwait each pledged US$4 million
- The European Union offered three million euros (US$3,800,000)
- The United States offered $5 million; US military joins relief effort
- Australia offered 7.5 million Australian dollars (US$5,675,000) in aid relief, including 27 member medical team among over 80 personnel
- China offered $2 million U.S. dollars
- Canada offered two million Canadian dollars (US$1.8 million)
- India put forward an aid package worth $2 million.
- The Church of Jesus Christ of Latter-day Saints (Mormons) donated US$1.6 million worth of emergency supplies to devastated areas, teaming up with Islamic Relief Worldwide who provided the transportation. In addition, local Indonesian LDS members prepared thousands of meals, hygiene kits, cots, mattresses, and blankets for those requiring medical attention.
- The Netherlands promised 1 million euros in May plus an extra 10 million euros one month later, Belgium has pledged $832,000, while Norway, France and Italy have offered either medical teams or relief supplies
- The Red Cross, Red Crescent, OXFAM, Plan International, Jesuit Refugee Service alongside other NGOs and UN agencies, including WFP and UNICEF, provided plastic sheeting, tools and building materials, and cash assistance to the victims. Japan and Malaysia are to send medical teams to the affected region
- Singapore offered humanitarian relief assistance in the form of a 35-member Armed Forces Medical Team, a 43-member Civil Defense Force Disaster Assistance and Rescue Team, as well as US$50,000 worth of emergency supplies
- The United Nations World Health Organization sent medicines and communications equipment, enough emergency health kits to last 50,000 people three months, and surgical kits for as many as 600 operations
- Vietnam offered 1,000 tons of rice to Indonesia.
- The Isle of Man offered £30,000 (US$56,291) to Indonesia
- King Abdullah II of Jordan ordered to dispatch a plane laden with humanitarian relief to alleviate the suffering of Indonesian earthquake victims that hit Java. The aid included blankets, medicines and other medical equipment.
- MERCY Malaysia sent 6 missions to Yogyakarta the first being sent on 28 May 2006. Datuk Dr. Jemilah Mahmood, President of MERCY Malaysia (Mission Leader) and Saiful Nazri, Programme Officer from MERCY Aceh Office went there on the first mission travelling by a special United Nations Humanitarian Air Services (UNHAS) flight from Banda Aceh along with other international organisations based in Aceh and two tonnes of medical supplies contributed by the international agencies from Aceh. The first team had secured ground logistics for the subsequent teams coming in from Kuala Lumpur.

== Reconstruction ==
Applying lessons learned from the Aceh recovery from the 2004 Indian Ocean earthquake and tsunami, the government of Indonesia promoted a community-driven approach in reconstruction from the 2006 Yogyakarta earthquake. The government leveraged social capital to hasten the reconstruction process. In housing recovery for instance, both the government and NGOs introduced capacity building initiatives (e.g. socialization and on-the-spot training for the construction of earthquake-resistant housing such as penyuluhan and pelatihan teknis) and advocated for use of local materials (e.g., Merantasi). The Kecamatan Development Project (KDP) and the Urban Poverty Project (UPP) are examples NGOs supporting community-driven processes.

The government was slow to implement assistance in reconstructing private houses, leading many homeowners to repair or rebuild their homes either by themselves or with community help. Reconstruction in some areas was aided by relief agencies, like the Red Cross Red Crescent.

Villagers rebuilt their homes with extremely limited resources, using simple affordable materials. They turned to traditional materials, such as bamboo, because of the damage inflicted by collapsing brick walls.

== See also ==
- List of disasters in Indonesia
- List of earthquakes in 2006
- List of earthquakes in Indonesia
- Sidoarjo mud flow
