= Komering =

Komering - autonym in the Komering language: Kumering - may refer to:

- Komering River, South Sumatra, Indonesia
- Komering language, an Indonesian language
- Komering script, an abugida used to write the Komering language
- Komering people, an ethnic group related to the Lampung people
