= Lampung =

Province in Sumatra, Indonesia

- Province
- Province of Lampung; Provinsi Lampung
- Coat of arms
- Motto(s): Sai Bumi Ruwa Jurai (Lampung Api) "One Land, Two Indigenous Peoples"
- Anthem: Sang Bumi Ruwa Jurai "One land, Two Kinds"
- Lampung in Indonesia
- Interactive map of Lampung
- Coordinates: 5°24′S 105°18′E
- Country: Indonesia
- Region: Sumatra (Western Indonesia)
- Established: 18 March 1964
- Capital and largest city: Bandar Lampung

Government
  - Body: Lampung Provincial Government
  - Governor: Rahmat Mirzani Djausal (Gerindra)
  - Vice Governor: Jihan Nurlela
  - Legislature: Lampung Regional House of Representatives (DPRD)

Area
  - Total: 33,570.76 km^{2} (12,961.74 sq mi)
  - Rank: 26th in Indonesia
- Highest elevation (Mount Pesagi): 2,262 m (7,421 ft)

Population (mid 2025 estimate)
  - Total: 9,522,910
  - Rank: 8th in Indonesia
  - Density: 283.667/km^{2} (734.694/sq mi)
- Demonym(s): Lampungese (in English); Jamma Lampung (in Lampung Api); Ulun Lappung (in Lampung Nyo); Orang Lampung (in Indonesian)

Demographics
  - Ethnic groups (2010): List: 64.17% Javanese; 13.56% Lampung; 11.88% Sundanese; 5.64% Malay; 1.38 Balinese; 3.37% Others
  - Religion (2022): List: 95.48% Islam; 1.51% Protestantism; 1.49% Hinduism; 0.91% Catholicism; 0.32% Buddhism; 0.01% Confucianism; 0.27% Unknown
  - Languages and dialects: Indonesian (official); Lampung Api and Lampung Nyo (native); Javanese, Komering, Sundanese, Balinese, other
- Time zone: UTC+7 (Indonesia Western Time)
- Postal code: 34111–35686
- ISO 3166 code: ID-LA
- Vehicle registration: BE
- GDP (nominal): 2022
- Total: Rp 414.1 trillion (11th); US$27.9 billion Int$87.0 billion (PPP)
- Per capita: Rp 45.1 million (25th); US$3,039; Int$9,484 (PPP)
- Growth: ▲4.28%
- HDI (2024): ▲0.731 (26th) – high
- Website: lampungprov.go.id

Lampung (English: /ˈlæmpʌŋ/; Indonesian: [ˈlampʊŋ]), officially the Province of Lampung (Indonesian: Provinsi Lampung; Indonesian pronunciation: [proˌfinsi ˈlampʊŋ]), is a province of Indonesia. It is located on the southern tip of the island of Sumatra. It has a short border with the province of Bengkulu to the northwest, and a longer border with the province of South Sumatra to the north, as well as a maritime border with the provinces of Banten and Jakarta to the east. It is the home of the Lampung people, who speak their own language and possess their own written script. Its capital city is Bandar Lampung.

The province covers a land area of 33,570.76 km^{2} and had a population of 7,608,405 at the 2010 census, 9,007,848 at the 2020 census, and 9,522,910 (comprising 4,857,470 males and 4,665,440 females) according to the official estimates for mid 2025, and projected to be 9,623,790 as at mid 2026 with three-quarters of that being descendants of Javanese, Sundanese and Balinese migrants from Java and Bali islands. These migrants came from more densely populated islands in search of available land, as well as being part of the national government's Indonesian transmigration program, of which Lampung was one of the earliest and most significant transmigration destinations. The provincial population continues to rise by over 100,000 per year.

In 1883, the volcano of Krakatoa, located on an island in the Sunda Strait, erupted into becoming one of the most violent volcanic eruptions in recorded history, with disastrous consequences for the area and elsewhere, including estimates of human fatalities in the tens of thousands and worldwide temperature and other weather effects for years.

== Etymology ==
The etymology of Lampung is unknown. Early Chinese sources mention kingdoms and locations in insular Southeast Asia that have been equated to Lampung. In the mid-5th century CE, a Southeast Asian kingdom named P'o-Huang sent missions to the Chinese Song emperors. While its location is uncertain, by the 10th century, the geographical treatise Taiping Huanyu Ji mentions a place name of To-Lang-P'u-Huang. Gabriel Ferrand and O.W. Wolters posited it may refer to the same place rendered as Tulang Bawang in modern-day Indonesian, being the present-day name of a river and two regencies in Lampung province.

J.V.G. Mills of the Malaysian Branch of the Royal Asiatic Society equated Lampung with a kingdom he transliterated as Lan-Pang that is mentioned in the Yingya Shenglan, a 1451 Chinese travelogue describing Zheng He's voyages in Southeast Asia.

All these interpretations indicate that both Lampung and Tulang Bawang may ultimately derive from the same ancient root and have been in use since at least the 5th century CE. Both the terms lampung and tulang bawang have a distinct meaning in modern Indonesian, with the term lampung meaning "to float", while the term "tulang bawang" means "onion bone", but it is highly probable their etymological origin is entirely unrelated to these modern-day renditions.

Folk etymology connects the name Lampung to the Batak language word lappung, meaning 'big' or 'large', and tells the anecdotal myth of an volcanic eruption of Mount Marapi so enormous that it could be seen from the top of Mount Pesagi, where a witness loudly proclaimed "lappung, lappung, lappung". The region surrounding Mount Pesagi was then named Lappung after this exclamation, eventually becoming Lampung.

Historical population
Year	Pop.	±%
1971	2,777,008	—
1980	4,624,785	+66.5%
1990	6,017,573	+30.1%
1995	6,657,759	+10.6%
2000	6,741,439	+1.3%
2005	7,116,177	+5.6%
2010	7,608,405	+6.9%
2015	8,109,601	+6.6%
2020	9,007,848	+11.1%
2025	9,522,910	+5.7%
Source: and previous

== History ==
=== Early history ===
Lampung came under the reign of the burgeoning Sumatra-based Buddhist Srivijaya empire in the late 7th century CE. Stone inscriptions dated to c. 680 CE were found in the villages of Palas Pasemah (in present-day South Lampung Regency) and Bungkuk (in present-day East Lampung Regency), respectively. These inscriptions are shortened versions of the Telaga Batu inscription, which itself was found in the capital of Srivijaya, the modern-day city of Palembang in the South Sumatra province. Historians interpret the two finds in Lampung as indicative of Srivijaya-aligned coastal settlements near the mouth of the Sekampung River on Lampung’s East coast, and that this area presented the Southernmost extend of Srivijaya’s power at that time.

Inscriptions from later periods of Srivijaya were also found. A Buddhist inscription written in Sanskrit and dated to the 9th century CE was found in Batu Bedil (present-day Tanggamus Regency), while two 10th-century inscriptions written in Old Malay were found in Ulu Belu (Tanggamus) and Hujung Langit (West Lampung Regency), the latter specifically dated to 997 CE. All three of these inscriptions use a paleo-Javanese script, indicative of a growing Javanese influence on the area towards the end of the 1st Millennium CE. Similarly, at Jepara on the banks of Lake Ranau lie the foundations of a small stone temple, reminiscent of Javanese temples from the 9th and 10th century. There is archaelogical evidence that the Java-based Majapahit kingdom, which existed from the late 13th to the early 16th century, had a presence in Lampung.

=== Colonial era ===
The area that constitutes the modern-day province of Lampung was sparsely populated and did not constitute a politically unified territory until the colonial era. The region's pepper production drew the attention of various powers which laid claim to different parts of the region and its produce. The largest part, namely Lampung's Southern and Eastern coasts, were brought under the reign of the Banten Sultanate by its first Islamic ruler, Maulana Hasanuddin (r. 1550–1570). The northern part was at times claimed by the rivalling Palembang Sultanate, while the nearly uninhabited Western coastal regions beyond the Barisan Mountains were part of British Bencoolen from the 1680's until 1824.

From 1619 on, under the rule of Pangeran Ratu, Lampung's pepper could only by purchased by foreigners through the court of Banten, while under Sultan Ageng Tirtayasa (r. 1651-1683), the pepper trade was entirely monopolized and Lampung's pepper production had to be channelled through the sultan's court in its entirety. In the 1930s, Lampung still accounted for 30% of the world's pepper production.

The Dutch began to control the Lampung spice trade under Sultan Haji. The area was part of the Banten Sultanate until it was annexed by the Dutch in 1752, when it became known as the Residentie Lampoengse Districten. It became part of the Dutch East Indies.

By 1845, the total population of Lampung was 104,200 people, living mostly in small towns and settlements near the Southern and Eastern coasts and along the larger, navigable rivers. Other parts of the region, such as the mountainous Western parts or the upriver areas in the North, were nearly uninhabitated. Ethnically, almost all inhabitants were Lampung people. Beginning in 1905, under Dutch rule, transmigration programs were implemented. This program involved the migration of several hundred thousand people from Java to Lampung over several decades. Many Javanese moved to the transmigration sites located in the eastern region of Lampung. The program was expanded after Indonesian independence in the 1960s. The Javanese quickly came to outnumber the indigenous Lampung people and became the largest ethnic group in Lampung. The Lampung people, who had constituted almost 100% of the population in the mid-1800's, had fallen to around 70% by 1920, and eventually to less than 15% by the mid-1980's, a proportion that has remained stable to this day.

=== After independence ===
Provinsi Lampung was created on 18 March 1964 with the implementation of the Peraturan Pemerintah Nomor 3/1964, later becoming Undang-undang Nomor 14 Tahun 1964. The province broke away from South Sumatra, and Kusno Danupoyo became its first governor.

== Geography ==
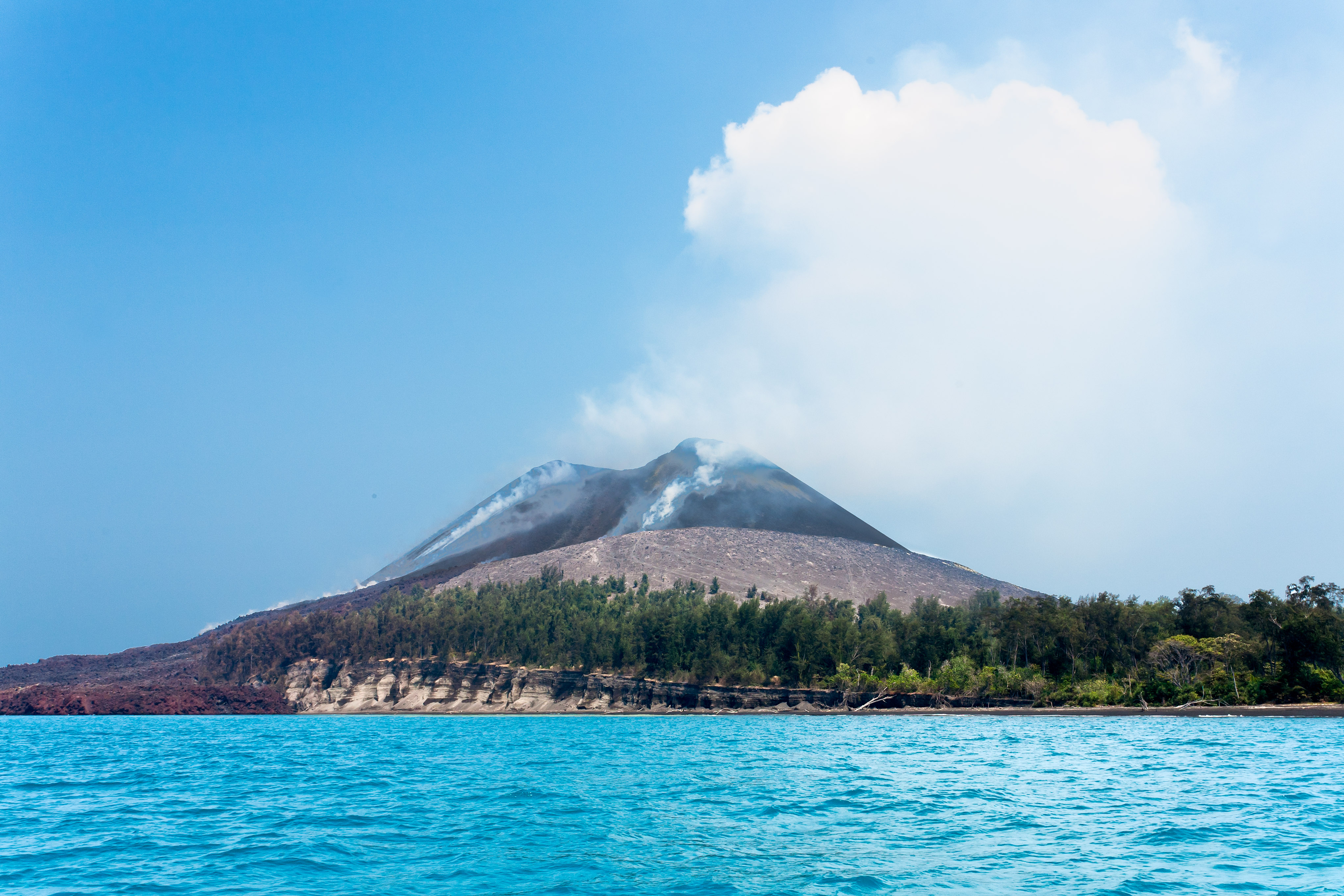
Anak Krakatoa

Lampung Province has an area of 33,570.76 km^{2} (12,961.74 sq mi), about the same size as the nation of Moldova or Russia's Bryansk Oblast. The province borders the Sunda Strait to the southeast and the Java Sea to the east. There are a number of offshore islands within Lampung Province, such as Legundi, Krakatoa, and Tabuan. These islands are located mostly in the Bay of Lampung. Pisang Island lies at the entrance to the Regency of West Lampung. There are 172 islands considered to be part of the province that have names.

The highest mountain in Lampung is Mount Pesagi, standing at 2,262 m (7,421 ft) above sea level in West Lampung. The river Way Sekampung is the longest river in the province, at 265 km (165 mi) with a catchment area of 4,795.52 km^{2} (1,851.56 sq mi). Mount Krakatau is a volcanic caldera located in the Sunda Strait, close to the Lampung province. The Krakatoa erupted from 20 May until 21 October 1883, which caused landslides, producing high waves in the coastal area of Lampung.

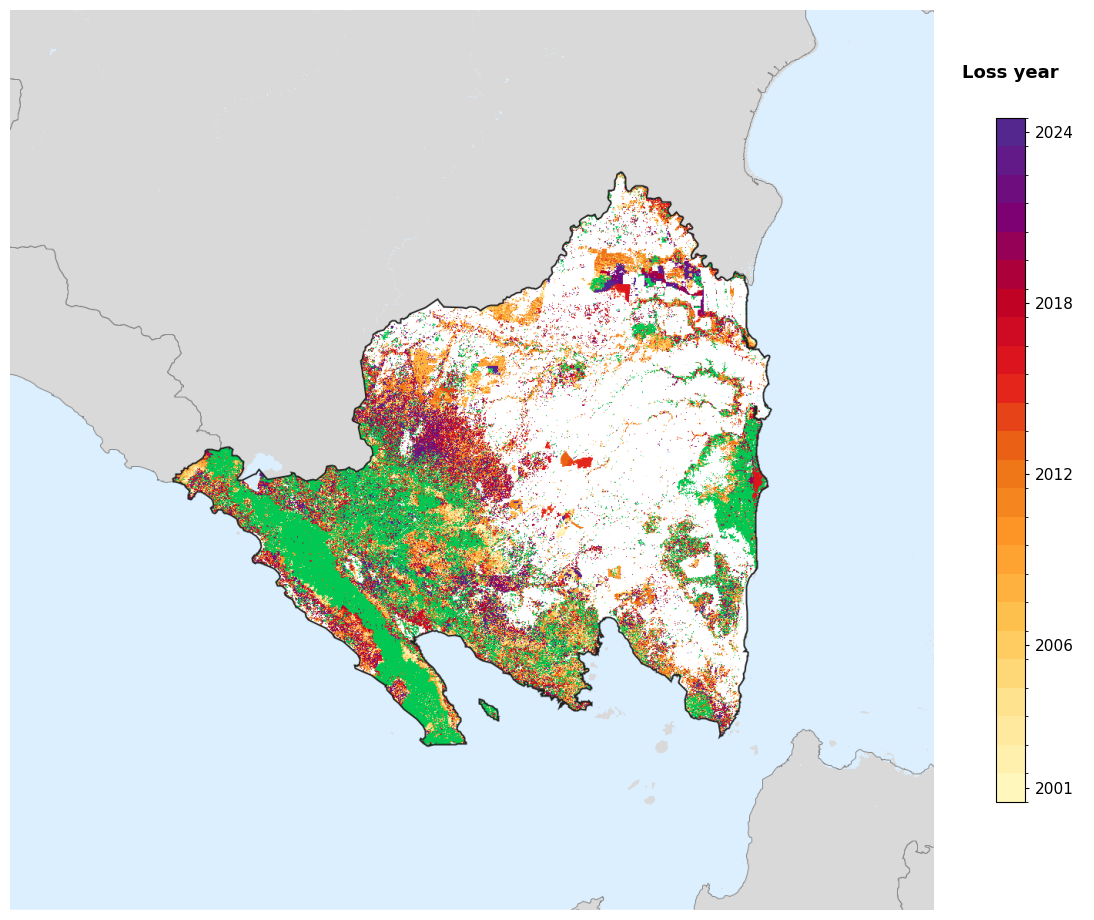
Tree-cover loss year in Lampung, 2001-2024, from the Global Forest Change dataset.

Between 1969 and 1970, the total area of forest land in Lampung that had been used was 249,200 hectares. In 2000, there were 48 permits issued; in 1980, the number reached 76 permits. The topography of the region in the western part is mostly hilly, while the eastern part is mostly a lowland area that is agricultural and swampy. In 1950, nine specimens per 100 square kilometres in Lampung were collected as part of botanical research.

== Government and administrative divisions ==
Lampung Province, which was formed from the southern portion of South Sumatra Province in 1964, was initially composed of just three regencies (kabupaten) - Lampung Selatan, Lampung Tengah and Lampung Utara - and one autonomous city, Bandar Lampung (originally the separate towns of Tanjungkarang andTelukbetung). A fourth regency (Lampung Barat) was created on 16 August 1991 from part of Lampung Utara, and on 3 January 1997, two further regencies were created - Tanggamus from part of Lampung Selatan and Tulang Bawang from part of Lampung Utara.

On 20 April 1999, two additional regencies were formed: Lampung Timur from part of Lampung Tengah and Way Kanan from part of Lampung Utara, as well as a second autonomous city, Metro, from another part of Lampung Tengah. A ninth regency (Pesawaran) was created on 17 July 2007 from a part of Lampung Selatan.

On 29 October 2008, three more regencies were formed: Mesugi and Tulang Bawang Barat from parts of Tulang Bawang Regency, and Pringsewu from part of Tanggamus Regency. A thirteenth regency (Pesisir Barat) was formed on 25 October 2012 from the west coast part of Lampung Barat Regency. All thirteen regencies and the two cities are listed below with their revised areas and their populations at the 2010, 2020 and at the mid 2025 official estimates.

Area code	Name of city or regency	Area (km^{2})	Population census 2010	Population census 2020	Population estimate (mid 2025)	Capital	HDI 2018
18.71	Bandar Lampung City	183.72	881,801	1,166,066	1,226,210	Bandar Lampung	0.766 (High)
18.72	Metro City	73.21	145,471	168,676	177,520	Metro	0.762 (High)
18.02	Central Lampung Regency (Lampung Tengah)	4,559.57	1,170,717	1,460,045	1,541,430	Gunung Sugih	0.697 (Medium)
18.07	East Lampung Regency (Lampung Timur)	3,860.55	951,639	1,110,340	1,164,700	Sukadana	0.690 (Medium)
18.11	Mesuji Regency	2,200.41	187,407	227,518	245,210	Mesuji	0.628 (Medium)
18.03	North Lampung Regency (Lampung Utara)	2,669.30	584,277	633,099	665,760	Kotabumi	0.671 (Medium)
18.09	Pesawaran Regency	1,286.84	398,848	477,468	506,260	Gedong Tataan	0.649 (Medium)
18.10	Pringsewu Regency	617.19	365,369	405,466	429,740	Pringsewu	0.694 (Medium)
18.01	South Lampung Regency (Lampung Selatan)	2,227.36	912,490	1,064,301	1,133,390	Kalianda	0.678 (Medium)
18.06	Tanggamus Regency	2,947.19	536,613	640,275	678,020	Kota Agung	0.656 (Medium)
18.05	Tulang Bawang Regency	3,118.61	397,906	430,021	455,400	Menggala	0.677 (Medium)
18.08	Way Kanan Regency	3,522.11	406,123	473,575	503,310	Blambangan Umpu	0.666 (Medium)
18.04	West Lampung Regency (Lampung Barat)	2,110.10	277,296	302,139	319,300	Liwa	0.667 (Medium)
18.13	Pesisir Barat Regency	2,937.50	141,741	162,697	174,860	Krui	0.629 (Medium)
18.12	West Tulang Bawang Regency (Tulang Bawang Barat)	1,257.09	250,707	286,162	301,790	Panaragan Jaya	0.653 (Medium)
	Total Province	33,570.76	7,608,405	9,007,848	9,522,910	Bandar Lampung	0.690 (Medium)

The province has two of Indonesia's 84 national electoral districts to elect members to the People's Representative Council. The Lampung I Electoral District consists of 6 of the regencies in the province (Tanggamus, South Lampung, Pesawaran, Pringsewu, West Lampung and Pesisir Barat), together with the cities of Bandar Lampung and Metro, and elects 10 members to the People's Representative Council. The Lampung II Electoral District consists of the remaining 7 regencies (East Lampung, Central Lampung, North Lampung, Way Kanan, Tulang Bawang, Mesuji and West Tulang Bawang) and likewise elects 10 members to the People's Representative Council.

In 2024, the General Elections Commission (KPU) determined 85 legislative candidates for the Lampung Province DPRD for the 2024–2029 period. The political party Gerindra Party has the most seats, winning 16 seats.

== Agriculture ==
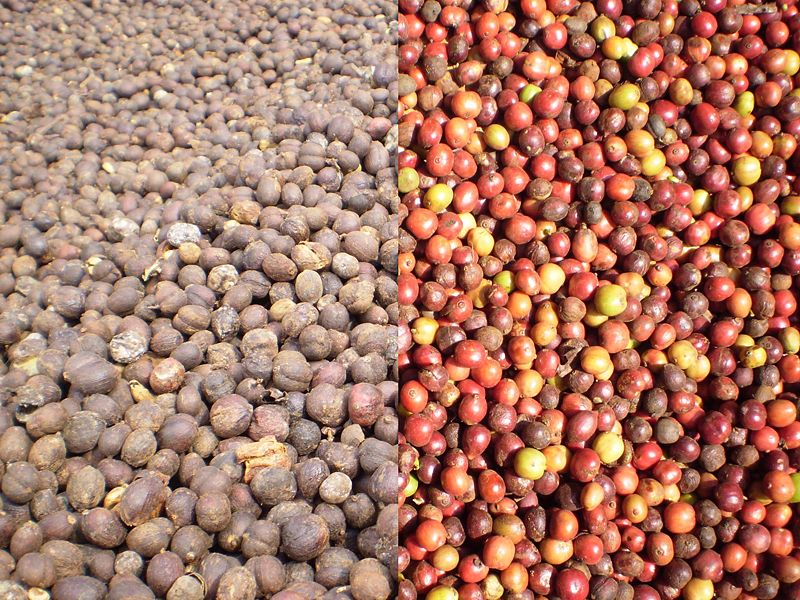
Robusta coffee beans, a type of coffee bean produced in Lampung

Major crops in the region include robusta coffee beans, cocoa beans, coconuts and cloves. This agriculture has included illegal growing in Bukit Barisan Selatan National Park. In addition, nata de coco is also manufactured in the region by domestic companies. Rubber and palm oil are also harvested.

According to Kementerian Kelautan dan Perikanan, in 2023, shrimp production in Lampung reached 59,613 tons. Indonesia has black pepper and white pepper. Lampung declined its pepper export rate in 2021 to minus 37.5 percent in a year. As of 2023, Lampung accounted for 42 percent of Indonesia's overall pepper exports.

== Culture ==
Lampung Province has 438 cultural heritage objects. There is an ancient site of the Islamic era in the form of an ancient cemetery in Bantengsari, East Lampung. Historical sites include the Tomb of National Hero Raden Intan II in South Lampung. The province has a Lampung Province Regional Regulation Number 2 of 2008. An example of traditional houses in Lampung includes Nuwou Sesat; the shape of the house was built to avoid potential animal attacks.

=== Clothing ===
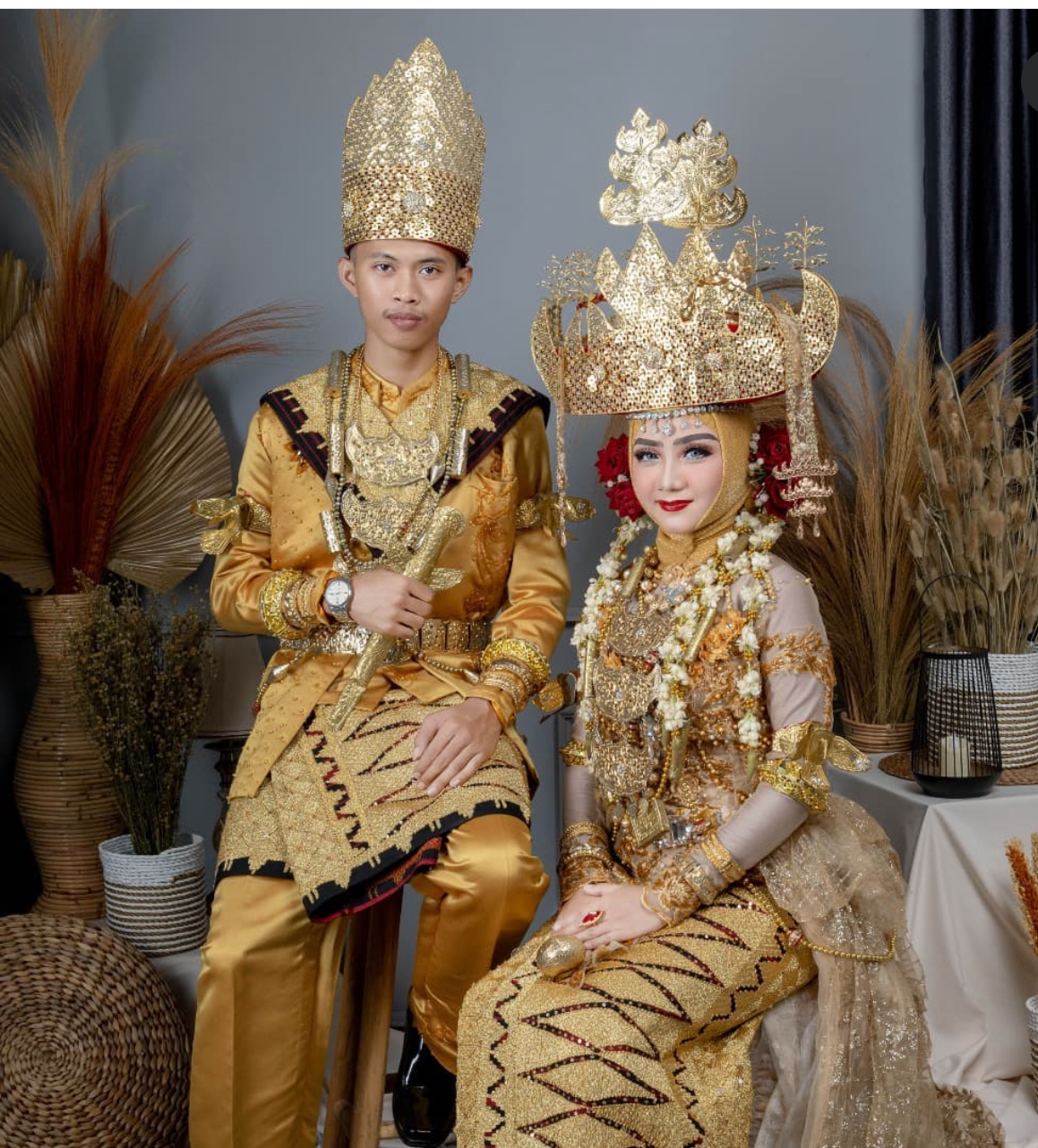
Lampung traditional clothing

Lampung traditional clothing is divided into two customs: Lampung Saibatin and Lampung Pepadun. In general, Lampung women wear a set of traditional clothing consisting of kebaya, a belt and slippers. A set of jewelry is also worn. The men's clothing consists of a sleeved shirt, a headband and sandals. Tapis is a woven cloth often worn by women as part of traditional clothing.

Siger is a traditional golden crown worn by Lampung women during traditional events. Siger typically has either seven or nine curves at the top. Similarly, kopiah emas is a metallic cap with sharp edges at the top that is worn mostly by men. The cap is decorated with a flower garland. Keris, Indonesia's traditional weapon, is sometimes included as part of a decorative item in Lampung's traditional clothing sets. Sometimes, the clothing is also used in regional Lampung dance performances such as the Bedana Dance and the Sembah Dance. Melinting is another traditional Lampungese dance.

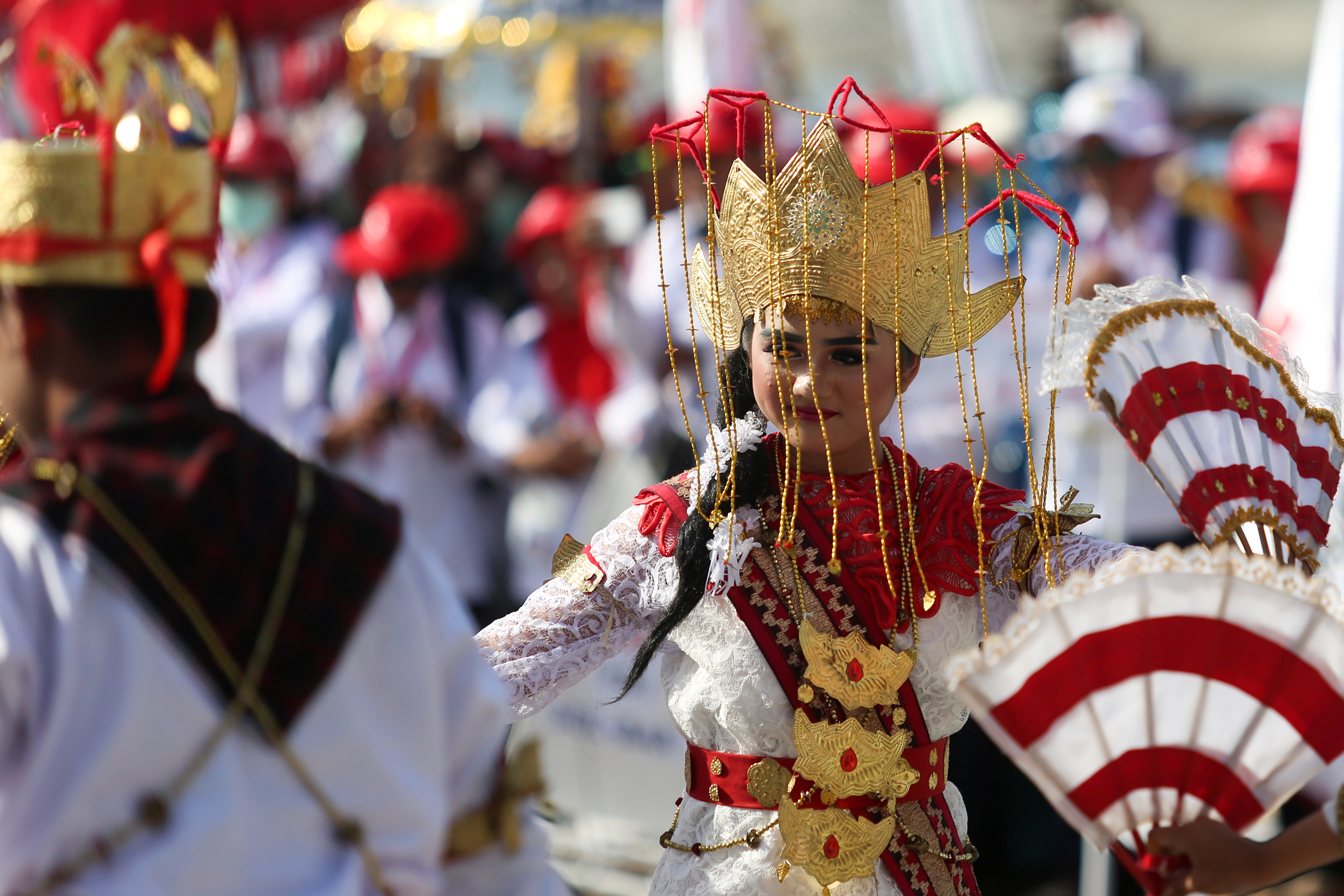
Melinting, a traditional dance in Lampung

=== Textiles ===
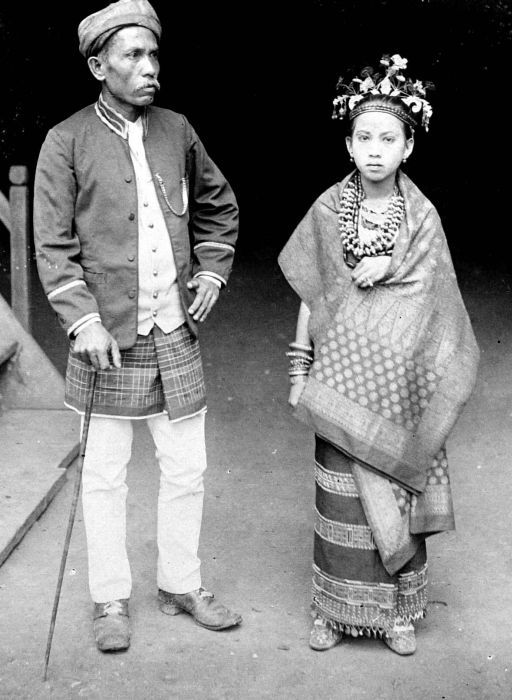
A Lampungese woman (right) wearing a Tapis sarong, with old coins hanging from the bottom

Lampung had a weaving tradition. Lampung weaving used a supplementary weft technique that enabled colored silk or cotton threads to be superimposed on a plainer cotton background. The most prominent Lampung textile was the Palepai, ownership of which was restricted to the Lampung aristocracy of the Kalianda Bay area.

There were two types of smaller clothes, known as tatibin and tampan. Lampung textiles like Palepai, tatebin and tampan were called 'ship cloths' because ships are a common motif. The ship motif represents the transition from one realm of life to the next, for instance, from boyhood to manhood or from being single to married, and also represents the final transition to the afterlife.

== Tourism ==
Although tourism is not Lampung Province's main source of income, the administration has attempted to boost tourism from beaches, such as Flamboyant Tanjung Setia. There is also Pahawang Island and Sari Ringgung Beach. In 2010, 400,000 tourists visited Lampung Province, including ten thousand foreign tourists mainly from Australia and New Zealand.

Lampung also has a national park, the Way Kambas National Park; it is an elephant sanctuary in the district of Labuhan Ratu, East Lampung. The number of Sumatran elephants (Elephas maximus sumatranus) living in the region has decreased. Way Kambas National Park was established in 1985.

The 15,000-capacity Pahoman Stadium is the main stadium in Lampung. The association football stadium opened in 1977.

== Demographics ==
Lampung's three major ethnic groups are the Lampungese, Javanese, and Sundanese. The Lampungese are the native ethnic group of the province. Languages used in the province include Indonesian (official), Lampung, Javanese, Sundanese, Komering, Minangkabau, and Balinese. According to the Indonesian census from 2010, the province of Lampung is 64.17% Javanese, 13.56% Lampungese, 11.88% Sundanese, 5.64% Malay, 1.38% Balinese, and 3.37% others.

=== Religion ===
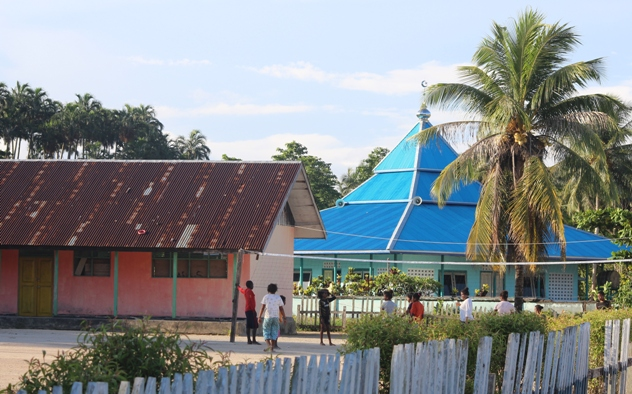
A traditional mosque in Lampung

The 2022 data of Ministry of Religious Affairs found 96.09% of the population as adherents to Islam and 2,22% as Christian. The remainder includes Hindus (1.4%), Buddhists (0.27%), and "other", including traditional beliefs (0.02%).

== Transport ==
=== Land ===
In the province of Lampung, the Bakauheni–Terbanggi Besar Toll Road spans from Bakauheni in South Lampung to Terbanggi Besar in Central Lampung along 140.9 kilometres (87.6 miles) and was completed in March 2019. Terbanggi Besar–Pematang Panggang Toll Road was constructed as part of the Trans-Sumatra toll road. Most of the roads in Lampung Province are made of asphalt.

Lampung has a bus terminal at Terminal Rajabasa, as well as the Talbot terminal in Bandar Lampung. Lampung Province has a railway line between Bandar Lampung–Palembang, which is part of a railway network in South Sumatra operated by Kereta Api Indonesia.

=== Sea ===
In the province, there are several ports. The Port of Panjang is an import-export harbor. About 92 kilometres (57 mi) south of Bandar Lampung, lies the port city of Bakauheni at the southern tip of Sumatra. Located at the southern end of the Trans-Sumatra Highway, the Bakauheni port connects Sumatra to the Port of Merak in Java via sea transportation.

=== Air ===
Radin Inten II International Airport is the only airport in the province.

== Education ==
Schools in Lampung consist of kindergartens, elementary schools, middle schools, and high schools/vocational schools, as well as universities, both state and private. Established in 1965, University of Lampung is based in Bandar Lampung.

== See also ==
- List of people from Lampung
