= Sang Bumi Ruwa Jurai =

Provincial anthem of Lampung, Indonesia

English: Two Peoples of One Land
- Regional anthem of Lampung
- Lyrics: Syaiful Anwar
- Music: Syaiful Anwar

Sang Bumi Ruwa Jurai (English: one land, two kinds) is the provincial anthem of Lampung, Indonesia. Its title also serves as the provincial motto.

Written by Syaiful Anwar, the song's lyrics talk of the unity between the Pesisir and Pepadun peoples of Lampung.

== Lyrics ==
Lampungese

Jak ujung Danau Ranau
Teliu mit Way Kanan
Sampai Pantai Lawok Jawo
Pesisir rik Pepadun
Jadi sai di lom lambang
Lampung sai kayo rayo

Lampung sai
Sang bumi ruwa jurai
Lampung sai
Sang bumi ruwa jurai

Ki ram haga burasa
Hujaini pemandangan
Huma lada di pematang
Apilagi cengkehni
Telambun beruntaian
Tandani kemakmuran

Lampung sai
Sang bumi ruwa jurai
Lampung sai
Sang bumi ruwa jurai

Canggat bara bulagu
Sambah jama Saibatin
Sina gawi adat sikam
Manjau rik sebambangan
Tari rakot rik melinting
Cirini ulun Lampung

Lampung sai
Sang bumi ruwa jurai
Lampung sai
Sang bumi ruwa jurai

Indonesian

Dari ujung Danau Ranau
Melewati Way Kanan
Sampai pantai Laut Jawa
Pesisir dan Pepadun
Jadi satu di dalam rumah
Lampung yang kaya raya

Lampung satu
Satu bumi dua macam
Lampung satu
Satu bumi dua macam

Jika kamu ingin merasakan
Hijaunya pemandangan
Kebun lada di pematang
Apalagi cengkehnya
Banyak beruntaian
Tandanya kemakmuran

Lampung satu
Satu bumi dua macam
Lampung satu
Satu bumi dua macam

Penghormatan pemuka adat (Pepadun)
Penghormatan pemuka adat (Sebatin)
Itulah aturan adat kami
Berkunjung dan larian
Tari ragat melinting
Tandanya orang Lampung

Lampung satu
Satu bumi dua macam
Lampung satu
Satu bumi dua macam

English

From far-flung Lake Ranau,
Passing o'er Way Kanan stream,
To the Sea of Java strand,
Pesisir and Pepadun,
Forging one unity,
In a rich and bountiful land,

Lampung dear,
Two peoples of one land.
Lampung dear,
Two peoples of one land.

Here evermore shall be,
A lush and verdant land,
The pepper fields a-calling,
The cloves us all a-binding,
Their strands signifying,
Prosperity abiding,

Lampung dear,
Two peoples of one land.
Lampung dear,
Two peoples of one land.

Our elders we shall honour,
Our traditions we'll observe,
For this is our sacred way,
Our dances and our games,
Our mutual aid,
Make who we are today,

Lampung dear,
Two peoples of one land.
Lampung dear,
Two peoples of one land.
