= Lampungese =

Lampungese may refer to:

- Lampung people, an ethnic group indigenous to Lampung province and parts of South Sumatra, Indonesia
- Lampung language, language of Lampung province, at the southern tip of Sumatra, Indonesia
