= List of people from Lampung =

This is a listing of notable people born in, or notable for their association with, Lampung.

== H ==
- Zulkifli Hasan, politician (South Lampung Regency)

== I ==
- Sri Mulyani Indrawati, economist, former Finance Minister of Indonesia, Managing Director of the World Bank Group (Bandar Lampung)

== K ==
- Udo Z. Karzi, writer (West Lampung Regency)
