= Tapis (Indonesian weaving style) =

Native Indonesian weaving style of Lampungese

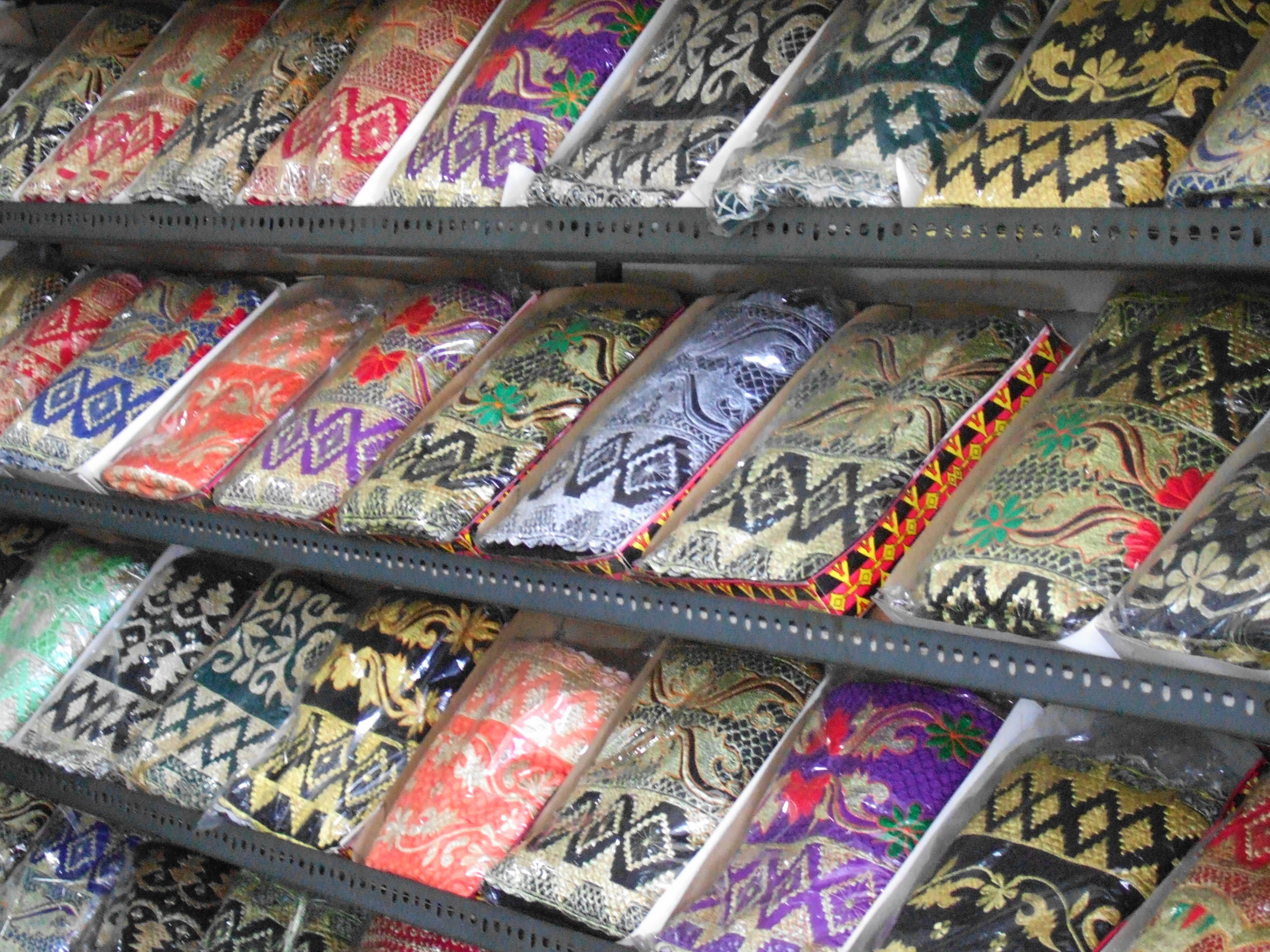
- Tapis being sold at a store in Indonesia
- Type: Art Fabric
- Material: silk, cotton, gold, silver
- Place of origin: Lampung, Indonesia

Tapis (Rejang: ꤳꤶꥇꤼ꥓; Indonesian: kain tapis or simply tapis) is a traditional Tenun style and also refers to resulting cloth that originated from Lampung, Indonesia. It consists of a striped, naturally-coloured cloth embroidered with warped and couched gold thread. Traditionally using floral motifs, it has numerous variations. It is generally worn ceremonially, although it can be used as a decoration. It is considered one of the symbols of Lampung and Lampungese.

== Production ==
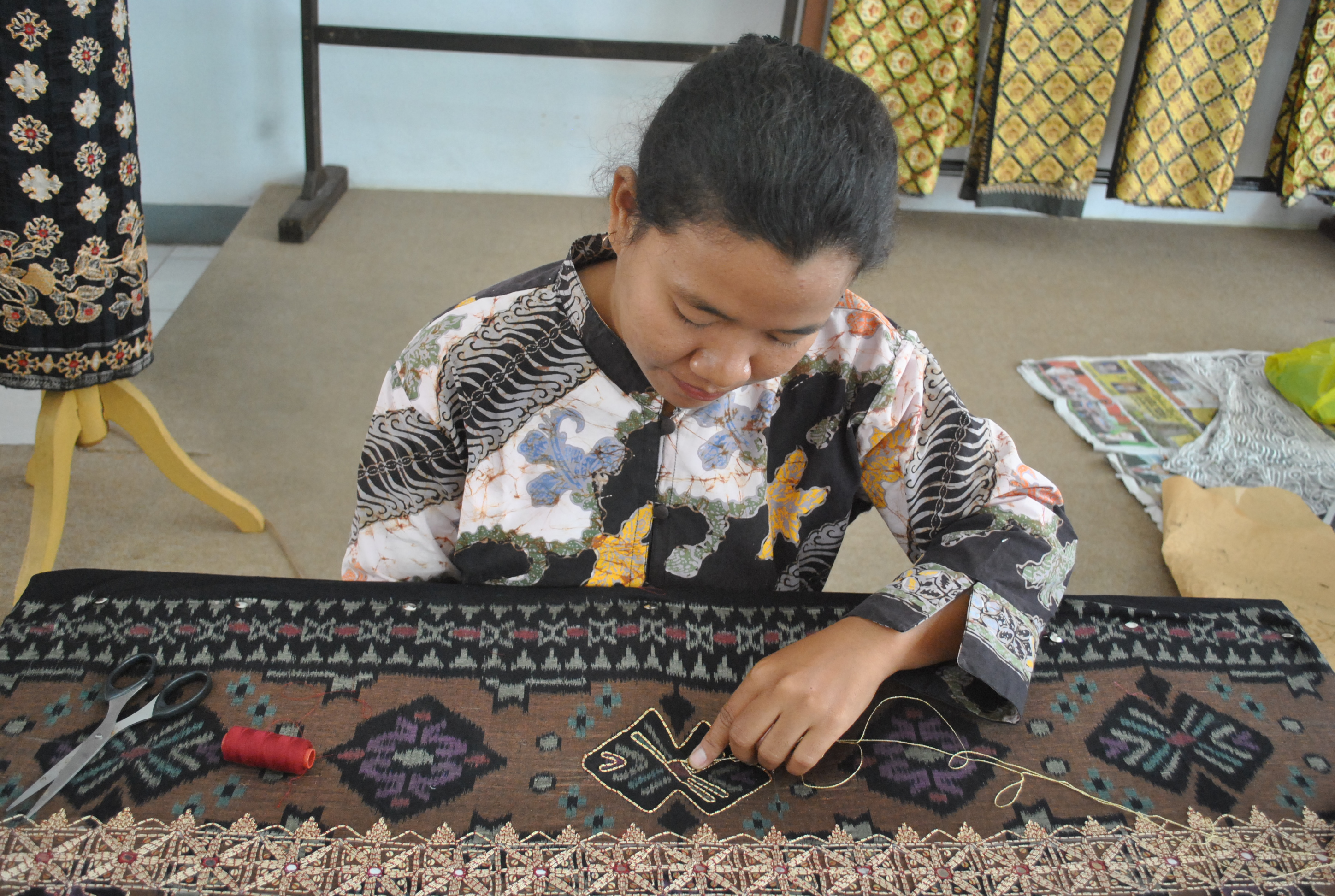
Tapis craftswoman embroider the basic design pattern in the tapis-making process at Lampung, Indonesia

Tapis is generally made by Lampungese women. In traditional production process, it consists of a woven, naturally coloured fabric with warped gold and silk embroidery. The gold thread, shaped in stripes, chevrons, and checks, contrasts the colours of the fabric. Tapis can also be decorated with beads, mica chips, or old colonial coins.

Furthermore, the gold embroidery is affixed using couching techniques, minimalizing waste. The gold thread is attached in sections, then couched with a different, less expensive, thread at turns. This ensures that none of the gold thread is used in a non-visible area.

Traditionally, tapis has floral motifs. However, modern tapis may also be based on the weaver's own design and include non-floral motifs, such as Arabic calligraphy. Other designs may include snakes, ships, and mythical creatures. Some tapis, called tapis tua (old tapis), are covered entirely in golden embroidery.

Although generally produced by Lampungese home industries, tapis is also produced in other areas, including Kendal, Central Java and Pisang Island.

== Use ==
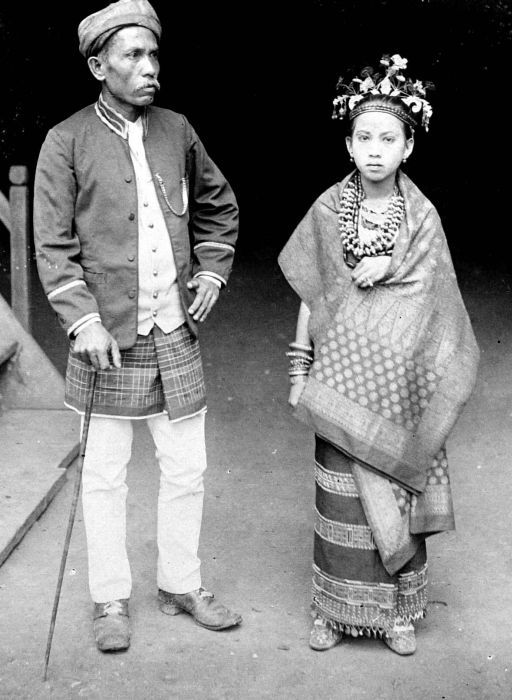
A Lampungese woman (right) wearing a tapis sarong, with old coins hanging from the bottom

Traditionally, tapis is worn as a sarong for weddings, Eid ul-Fitr celebrations, and welcoming ceremonies. However, tapis can also be used as a wall decoration. When worn, it forms a cylinder around the wearer's legs.

== Reception ==
Tapis has come to be seen as an important cultural symbol of Lampung. Some people describes tapis as having "exceptional beauty and sophistication", while some describes viewing tapis as "like seeing countless possibilities in art and life portrayed in cloth".

In addition, the price of tapis reflects its age. Generally, the older a tapis the more it costs. Antique tapis are also considered valuable collector's items and are collected by both Indonesians and foreigners.

== Gallery ==
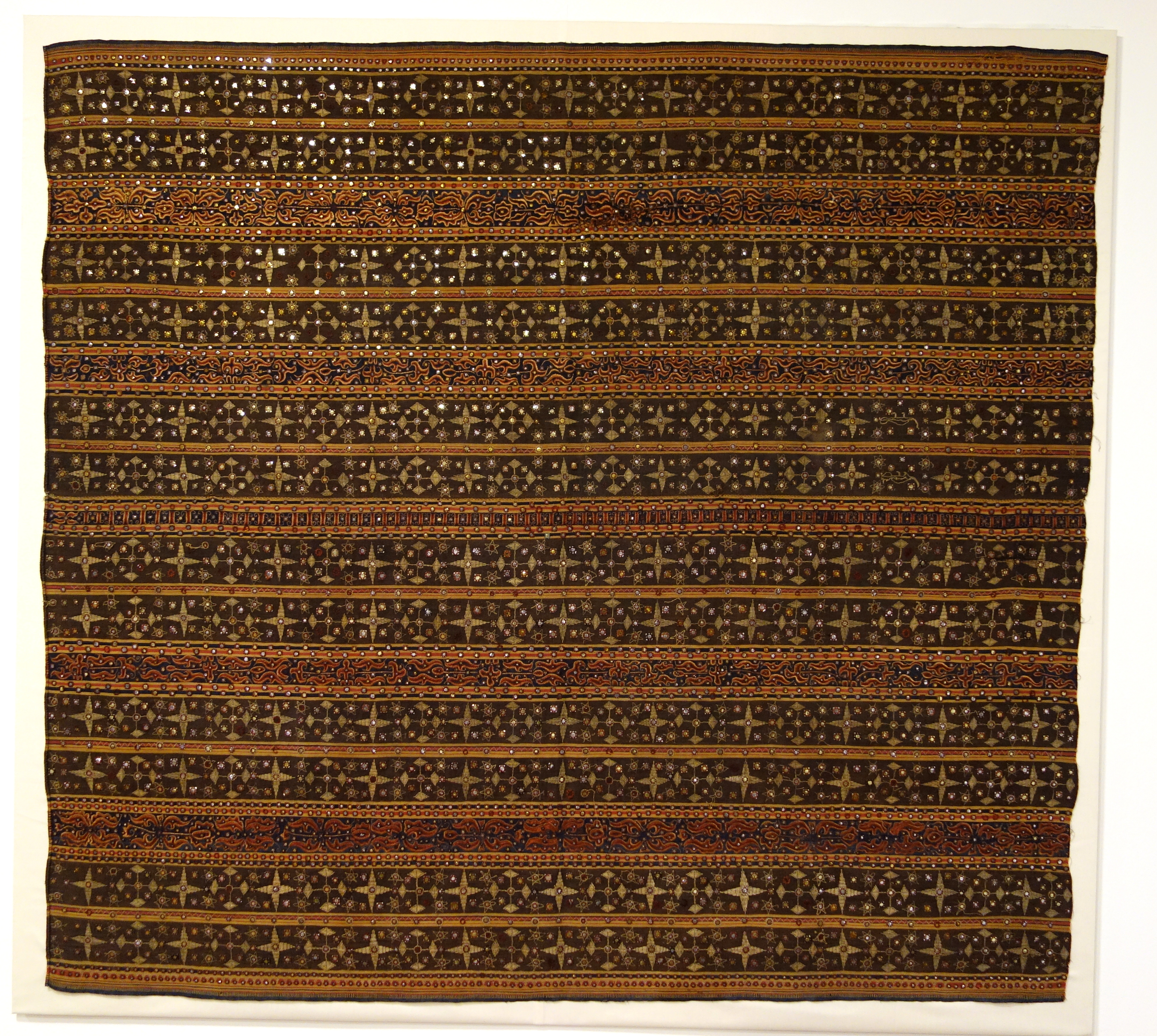
Tapis of Kauer people, Lampung at the Textile Museum of Canada

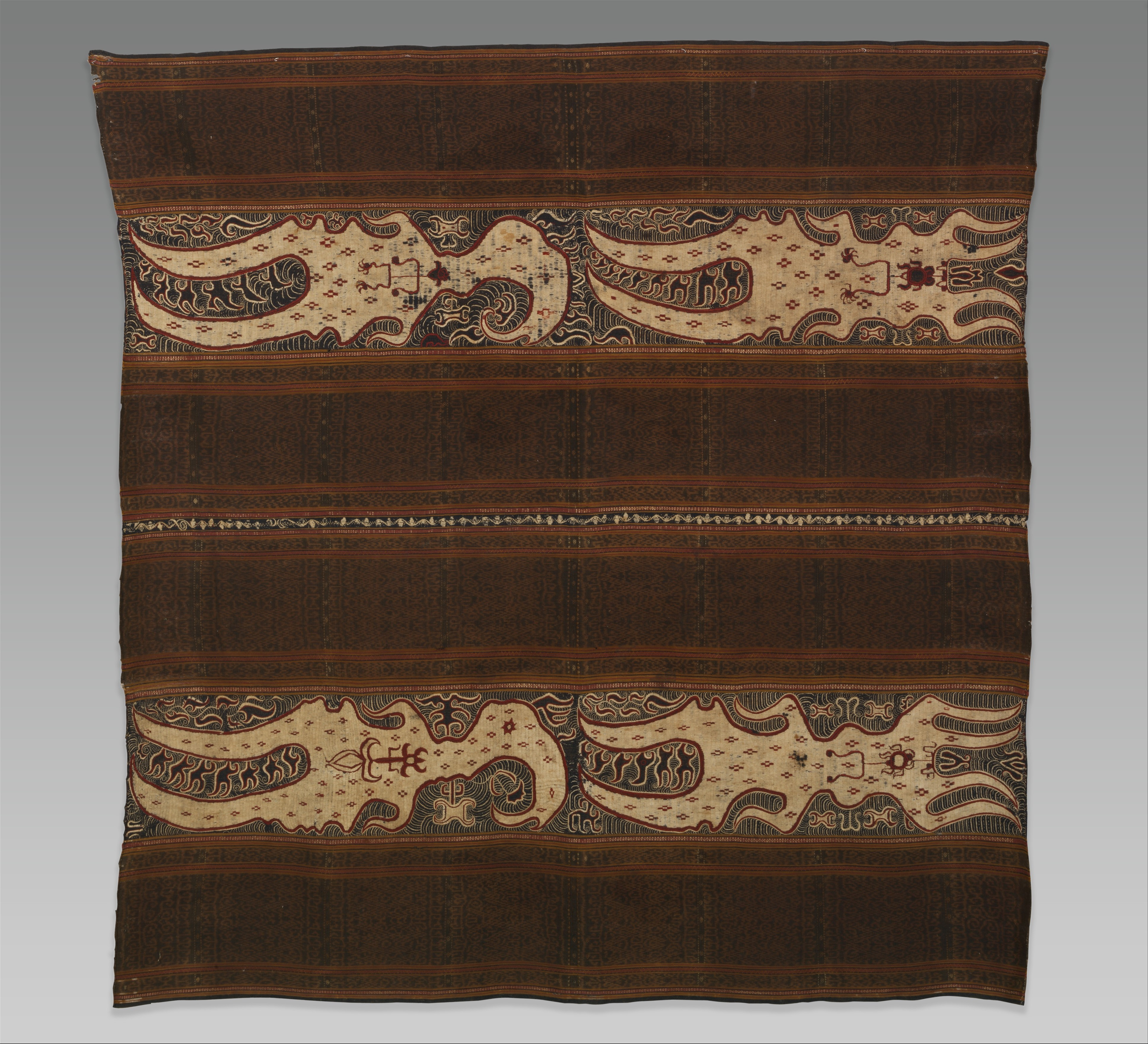
Tapis from Lampung c. 18th century (or earlier) at the collection of Metropolitan Museum of Art, New York

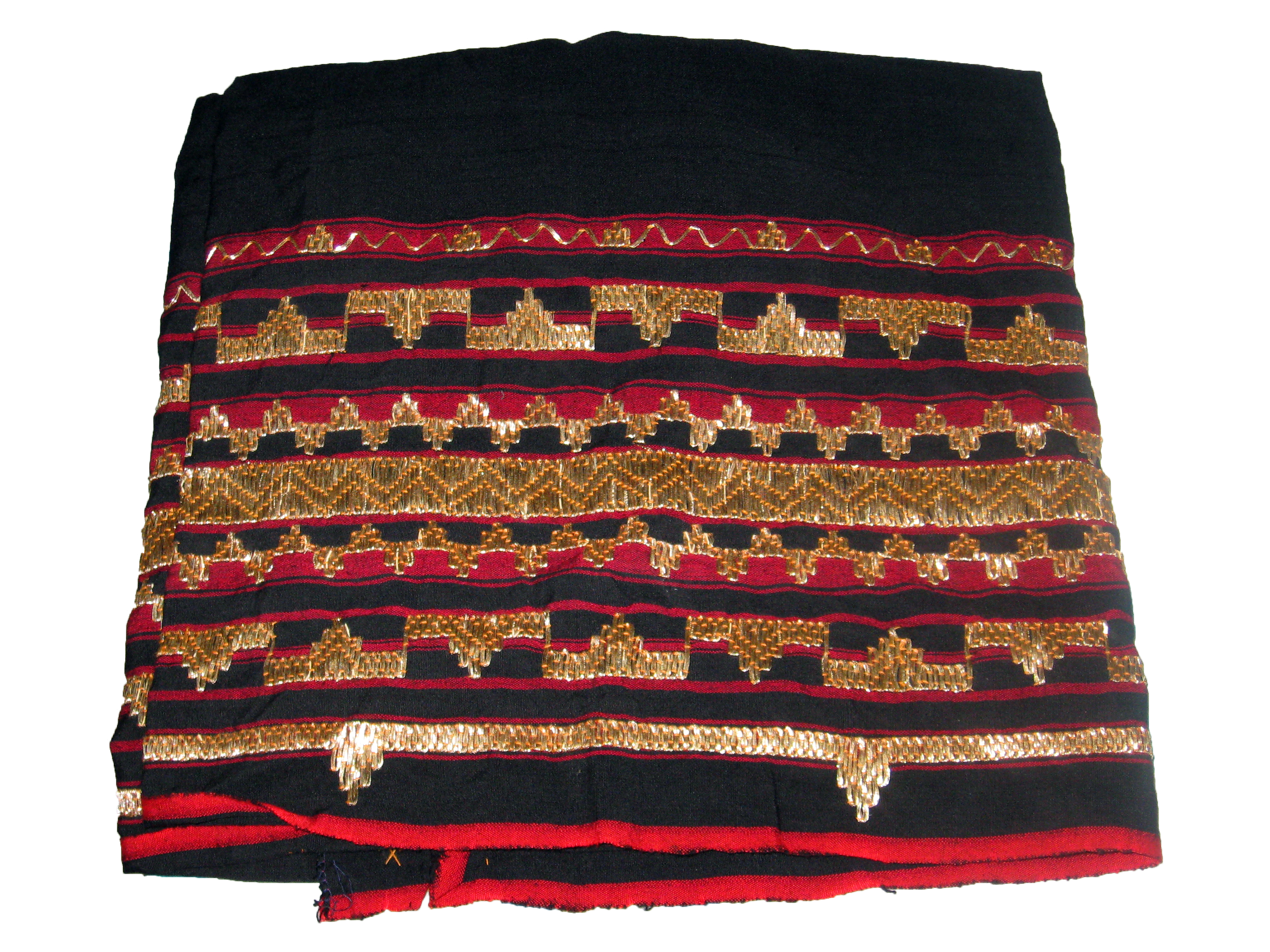
A black and red tapis from Lampung, Sumatra

== See also ==
- Ulos
- Ikat
- Batik
- Songket
