= Melinting =

Indonesian traditional dance

Melinting dance
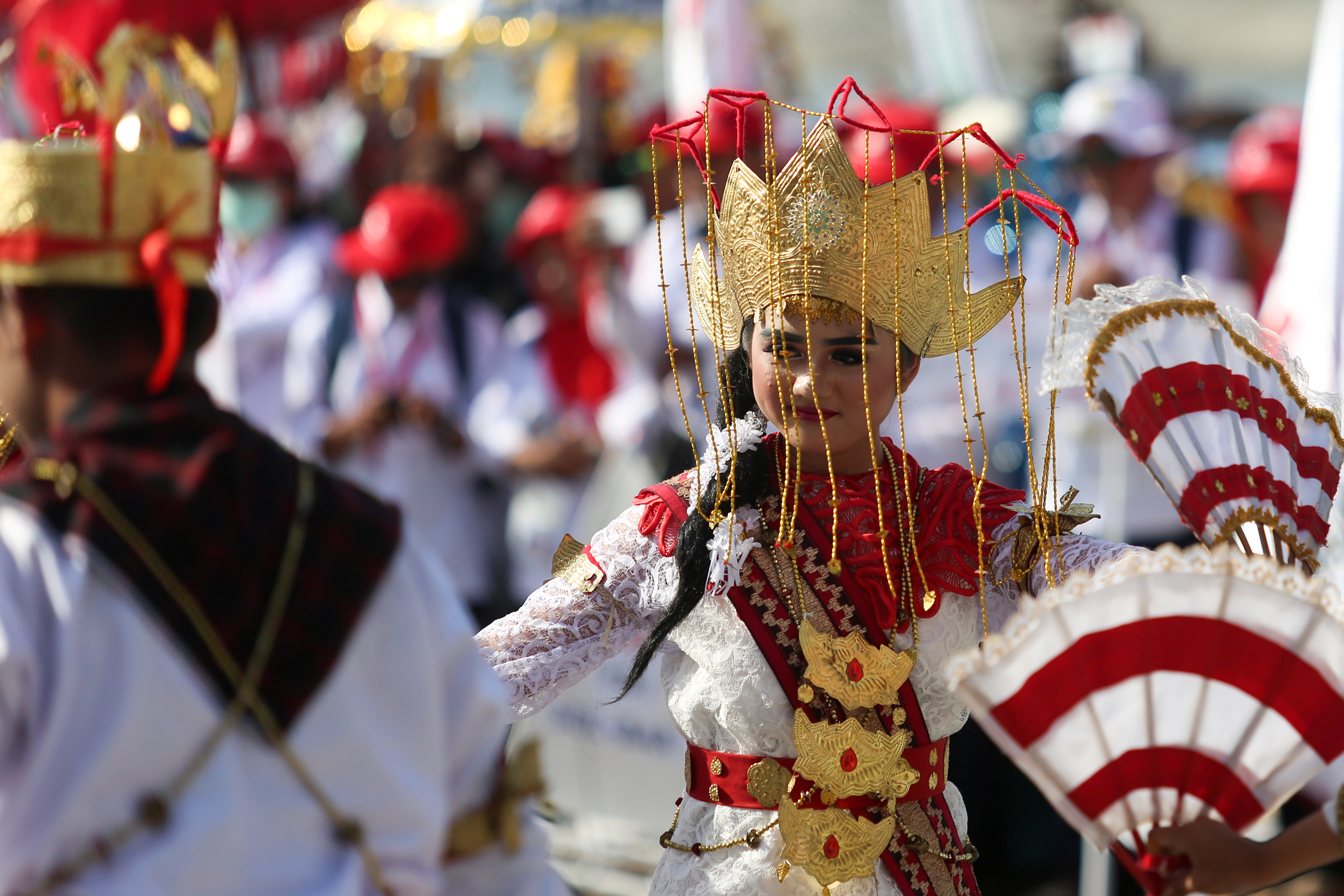
- Melinting dance performance in Lampung
- Native name: Tari Melinting (Indonesian)
- Genre: Traditional dance
- Instrument(s): Gamelan, Gong, Kendhang
- Inventor: Lampungese
- Origin: Indonesia

Melinting is one of the traditional dances from Lampung province, Indonesia. It was originally known as the Cetik Kipas dance before its name was changed to Melinting dance.The name change was proposed by President Sukarno, who asked the Central Lampung Regional Government to perform the dance at Istora Senayan Jakarta on August 17, 1965. Melinting is a dance inherited from Ratu Melinting, which is estimated to have existed in the sixteenth century. This dance is performed at traditional events when welcoming guests, and the dancers are members of the Queen's family or Melinting nobles. This dance was first performed outside a traditional event in 1930 in Teluk Betung at the invitation of the Resident of Lampung to Pesirah Marga in Lampung.

== History ==
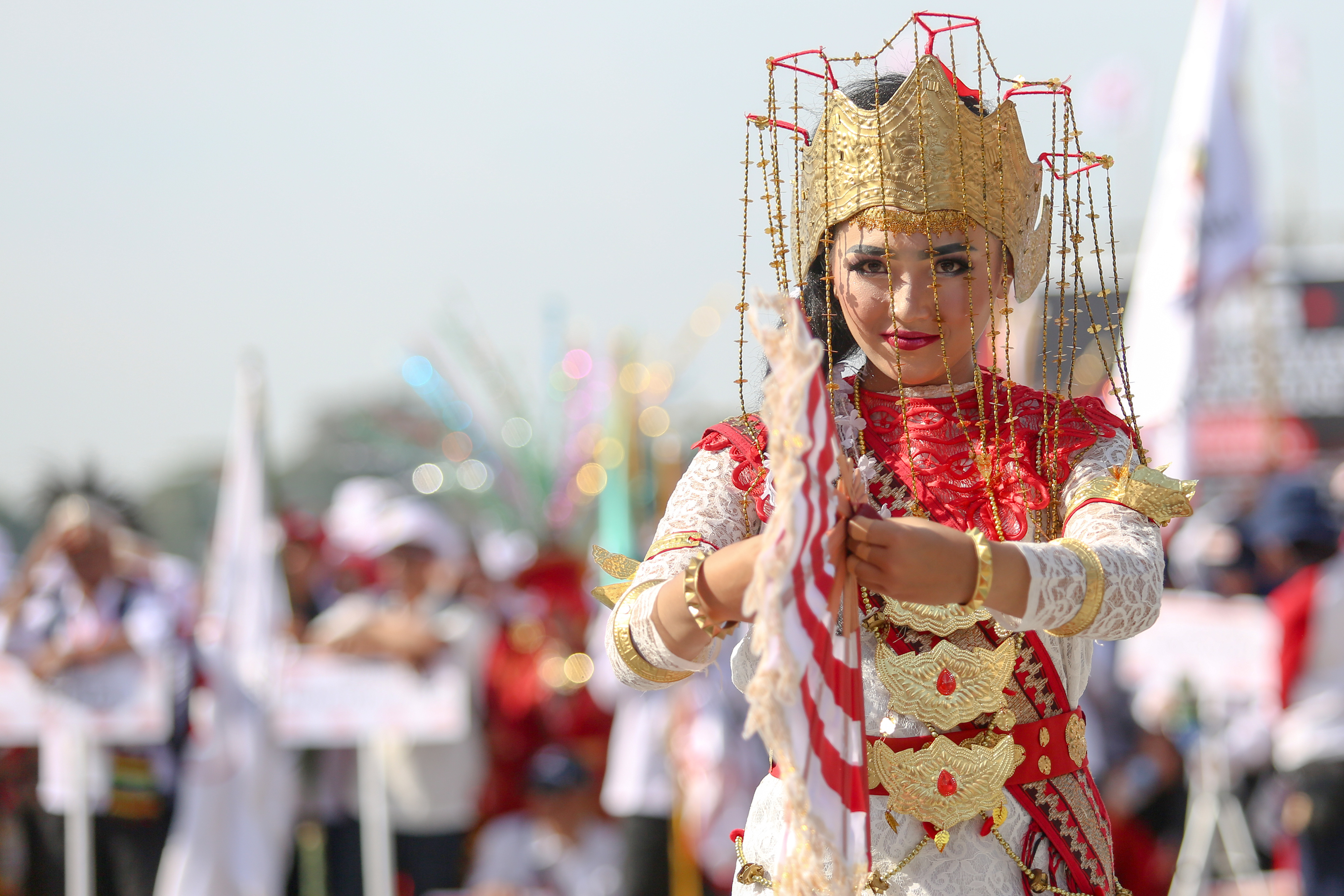
Melinting dance begins with the opening dance.

The Melinting dance originates from Lampung, and is thought to have developed since Islam gained a large following in Indonesia. However, this dance is not widely known even among the people of Lampung itself.

This dance is one of the relics of the Melinting Kingdom, which was created by Ratu Melinting II in the 16th century. This dance has the meaning of showing how people are grateful for the happiness they have received. In addition, this dance also illustrates the might and majesty of Ratu Meliting in leading the kingdom at that time. Before undergoing a refinement change in 1958, the Melinting Lampung dance was absolutely owned by the royal family of the Queen Melinting Family.

== Performance ==
=== Form and Movement ===
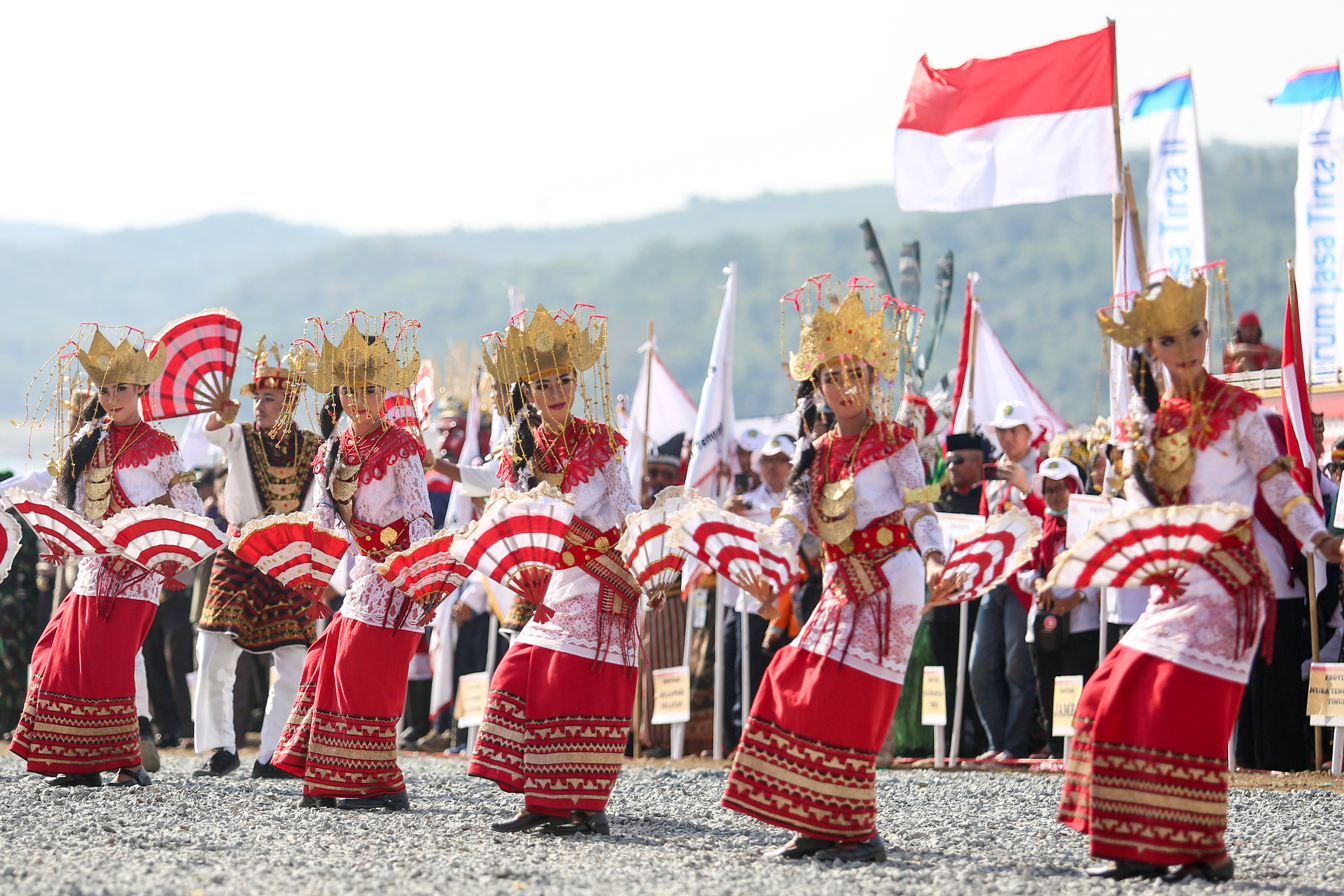
Female dancer

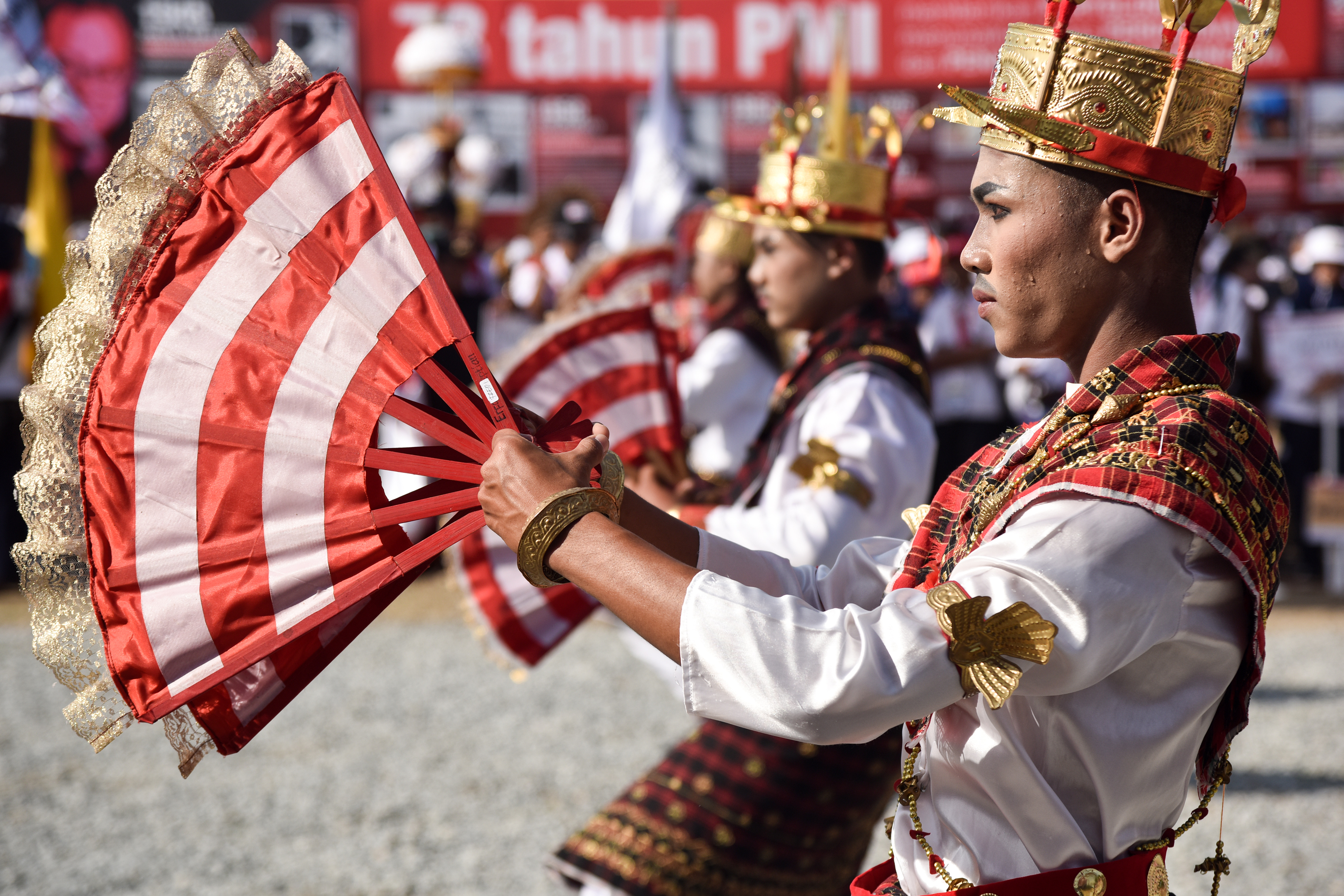
Male dancer

The movements in dancing are divided into two categories based on gender, with a total of eight dancers: four men and four women. When dancing, the dancers will be divided into several rounds, the opening round (Pembuka), the kugowo queen round, the floating kenui round, and the closing round (Penutup).

=== Outfit ===
Islam makes a contribution that affects how dance properties are. The Melinting dance costume for men consists of tapis cloth, a belanga shirt, seretei feathers (Bulu seretei), a fan with free colors, and a gold Skullcap.

Meanwhile, the Melinting dance properties for women consist of tapis pepadun, a long-sleeved white kebaya shirt, bun, singer rolling a yellow veil, jukum fruit, fan with free colors and ruwi bracelet. In addition to property, make-up is very important for Melinting dancers to create the right dancer's face; make-up will influence how the atmosphere is right for dancing the dance.

=== Music ===
Melinting dance uses various musical accompaniments typical of the people of Lampung, one of which is Kalo Bala. Besides Kalo Bala, the accompaniment of this dance also often uses kendang, gongs, gamelan, fiddle, and various other musical instruments.

The purpose of the musical accompaniment in the Melinting dance is:

- Opening dance
- Accompanying the dancers into the performance arena
- As a sign of respect for the guests present

== See also ==
- Gending Sriwijaya
- Dance in Indonesia
