= Komering people =

Ethnic group in Indonesia

Komering
Orang Komering; Jolma Kumoring
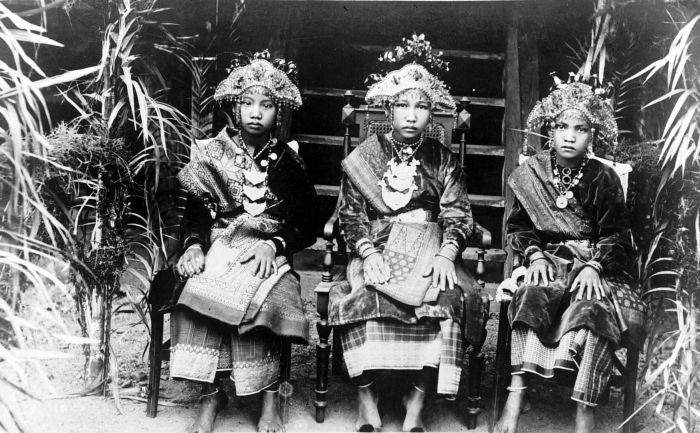
- Three Komering girls in 1929

Total population
- 530,000

Regions with significant populations
- Indonesia (South Sumatra)

Languages
- Native; Komering; Also; Indonesian • Palembang Malay

Religion
- Sunni Islam

Related ethnic groups
- Lampung, Palembang, Malay and Sumatran

The Komering (Indonesian: Orang Komering; Komering: Jolma Kumoring) are an ethnic group that inhabits the land along the Komering River in South Sumatra province.

The Komering tribe are a Lampungnese ethnic group originating from Kepaksian Sekala Brak in Lampung. There are around 530,000 Komering people throughout Indonesia, they are often found along the Komering River which crosses several areas such as; East Ogan Komering Ulu, Ogan Komering Ilir, and South Ogan Komering Ulu regencies in South Sumatra province.

== Etymology ==
In general, the name Komering is taken from one of the tributaries of the Musi River, namely the Komering River, which indicates that this area is Komering's territory. As also written by Zawawi Kamil (Menggali Babad & Sedjarah Lampung) it is mentioned in the Komering Minanga dialect poem;

"Adat lembaga sai ti pakaisa buasal jak Belasa Kapampang, Sajaman rik tanoh Pagaruyung pemerintah Bundo Kandung, Cakak di Gunung Pesagi rogoh di Sekala Berak, Sangon kok turun temurun jak ninik puyang paija, Cambai urai ti usung dilom adat pusako".

- English Translation;

"The customs used by this institution originate from Belasa Kepampang (Branched Jackfruit), contemporary with the Pagaruyung realm of the Bundo Kandung government (12th century) in Minangkabau, going up Mount Pesagi down at Sekala Berak. Indeed, it has been passed down from ancient ancestors, Betel nut is carried inside inheritance customs, if you are not good at the rules, it is a sign of being stateless".

== Culture ==
=== Housing and architecture ===
Most Komering people have houses called stilt houses, these houses are suitable for the geographical conditions where the Komering people are located. Generally, these stilt houses are called Rumah Ulu or ulu house.

- The characteristics of the house are:

1. Usually the pillars of this house are quite high, or higher than 1 meter.
2. It has a triangular or trapezoidal roof, sometimes it also resembles a pyramid.
3. Has a central room (kakudan and haluan), terrace or (garang), bedrooms, stair (ijan), and kitchen (pawon).
4. The area under the house is usually used as a warehouse, or a place to store firewood and agricultural products, sometimes livestock pens are built here. In modern culture this is no longer used, people usually build under their house as a new room so that the house has two floors.
5. For ancient ulu houses (lambahan bahari) the windows (rawang tingkap) are usually made of wood, while nowadays glass is more commonly used. The reason is because wood rots easily and can be eaten by termites, while using glass is more economical and easy to get in specialty glass shops.
6. Usually there is a special place in the corner of the house where the floor is usually not made of planks but made of bamboo slats, this place is where corpses are washed in the Islamic way. Because in ancient times there were no special tools for bathing corpses, and it was impossible to raise and lower corpses just to wash them.
7. Ancient Ulu houses usually have a fairly large size, because this house is multifunctional, such as wedding ceremonies, traditional parties, and deliberations held in the central room (kakudan and haluan).

=== Cuisine ===
1. Komering's typical food is Sambal Jok-jok, this chili sauce is made from grilled shrimp paste, chilies, sugar, salt, tamarind and orange juice. This chili sauce is usually eaten with grilled fish, fresh vegetables and warm rice.
2. Kasuran, Kasuran is a type of lontong which is only rolled up like a mattress. Kasuran is usually eaten during the Eid al-Fitr and Eid al-Adha holidays.

== Language ==
Komering people generally use Komering language as a means of communication at home, at school teachers also often teach in this language, even though Komering itself is not the official language at school. As for using Palembang Malay when meeting people from outside the area or when they are out of the area, Palembang Malay is the lingua franca in the province of South Sumatra. and there are also those who use Indonesian, usually they are Komering who have lived in urban areas for a long time.

== Religion ==
The religion of the Komering people is Islam. In the past the religions of the Komering people before the arrival of Islam were indigenous Animism religion, Buddhism and Hinduism. Islam has been spread by immigrants from Java, and increasingly rapidly under the rule of the Palembang Darussalam Sultanate.
