= Lake Ranau =

Pleistocene volcanic crater lake

Ranau
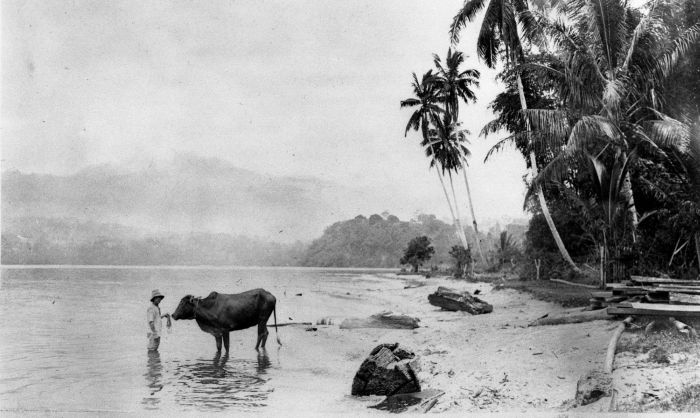
- Lake Ranau in August 1926

- Location within Indonesia Location within Sumatra
- Location: South Sumatra and Lampung, Indonesia
- Coordinates: 4°51′45″S 103°55′50″E
- Type: Tectonic/ volcanic
- Primary inflows: Warkuk River
- Primary outflows: Komering River
- Basin countries: Indonesia
- Surface area: 125.9 km^{2} (48.6 sq mi)
- Average depth: 174 m (571 ft)
- Max. depth: 229 m (751 ft)
- Water volume: 21.91 km^{3} (17,760,000 acre⋅ft)
- Surface elevation: 540 m (1,770 ft)

Lake Ranau (Indonesian: Danau Ranau) is a Pleistocene volcanic crater lake in Sumatra, Indonesia.

== See also ==
- List of drainage basins of Indonesia
- List of lakes of Indonesia
