= Adelaar =

Adelaar is a Dutch surname. Notable people with the surname include:

- Christel Adelaar (1935–2013), Dutch actress
- Frans Adelaar (born 1960), Dutch footballer and manager
- K. Alexander Adelaar (born 1953), Dutch linguist
- Willem Adelaar (born 1948), Dutch linguist

== See also ==
- Cort Adeler
