= Palepai =

Indonesian type of cloth

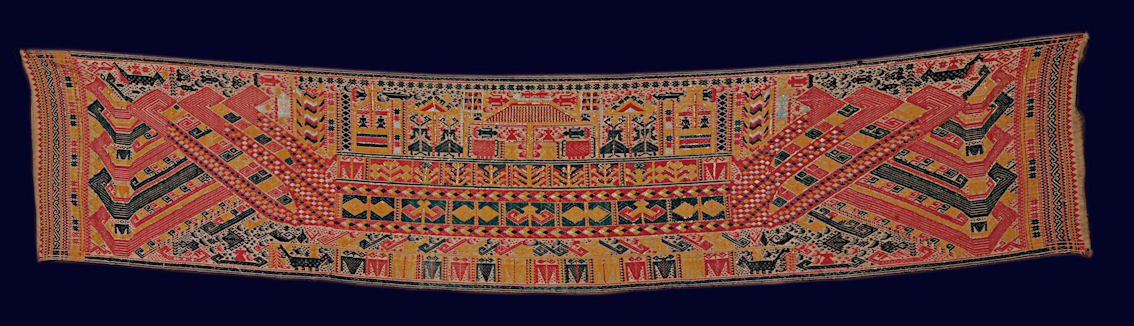
Pelapai, 256 cm long

Palepai are traditional cloths that had been described by foreign ethnographers and collectors as "ship cloths" because of the predominance of a ship motif and were said to represent the "ship of the dead". In Sumatra, Indonesia, these cloths are also called sesai balak (meaning 'big wall').

The history of these cloths is obscure. The factors that are presumed to have caused this include the abolition of slavery in 1859, the decline in the pepper trade and changing marriage traditions. Two lesser-known forms are the tatibin and the tampan maju. The tatibin are similar in design to the single ship palepai but are smaller, not exceeding 1.5 meters. The tampan maju is beaded and shorter than the others. Only 12 examples of tampan maju are known to exist.

== Design elements ==
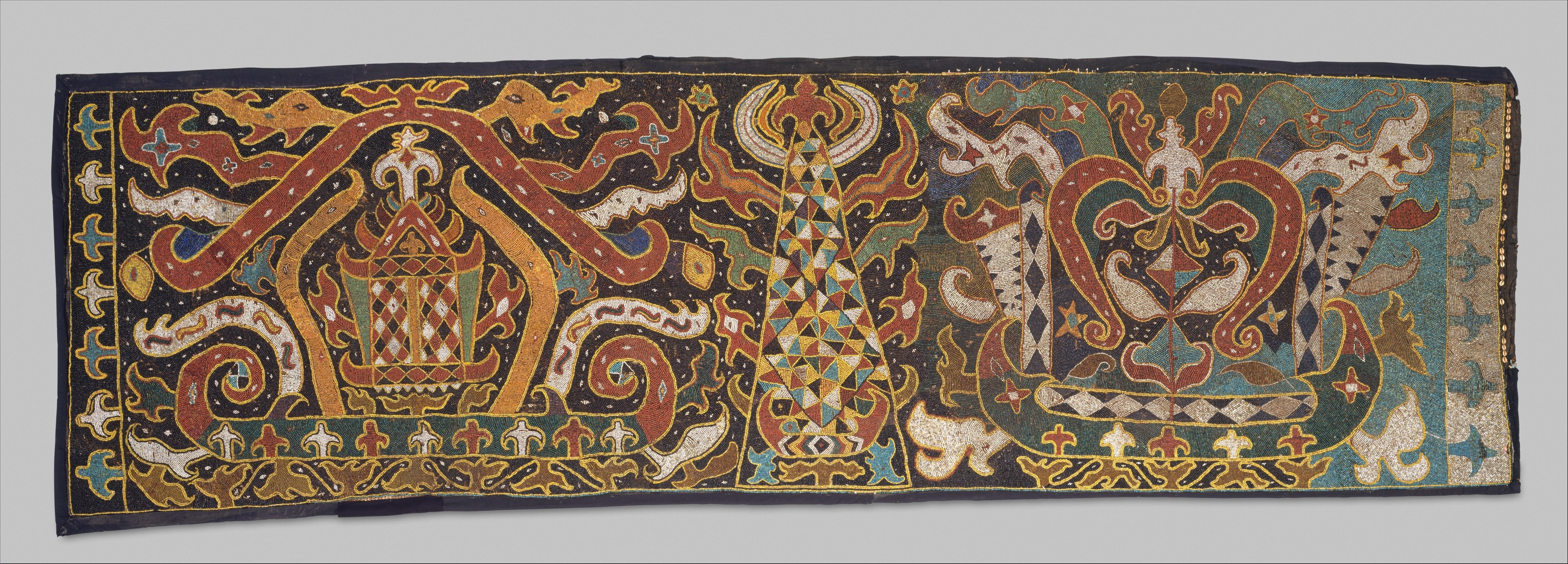
Palepai maju

No two known palepai are identical; however, their designs typically include: a large ship stretching the entire length of the cloth; two large red ships, an example of which can be seen in the Textile Arts Collection; two or three rows of stylized human figures extending along the length of the cloth, an example of which is in the art collection of the Powerhouse Museum in Sydney; and four or more discrete panels. These panels are usually of the same composition, an example of which is in the collection of the Art Gallery of New South Wales. Little is known about the meaning of the design elements of the ships cloth.

== Uses ==
The use of palepai is the prerogative of those of the penyimbang rank in the complex social structure of the Paminggir people.

In ceremonies, the palepai was hung on the right wall of an inner room of the house as a backdrop for the central figure in the rite. In the marriage ceremony, the bride sits in front of the cloth of her husband-to-be after arriving in a bedecked procession. On the bride's first visit home after the wedding ceremony, the cloth may have been hung, and then again after the birthed child is presented to the maternal grandparents to receive a name. The cloth is also hung at the celebration of a boy's circumcision and at funerals.

For the Paminggir nobility, the palepai was also used at ceremonies to know the pronunciation of the rank of the owner.

== Technical features ==
The designs are executed by continuous and discontinuous supplementary wefts on a plain cotton weave foundation. A supplementary weave is an additional weft element inserted between two of the regular foundation wefts. The major dyes used were most probably the same as those used in the manufacture of women's sarongs in the area. Sepang (Caesalpinia sappan) and tamarind for the red, turmeric and tamarind for the yellow, and indigo and lime for the blue.

== Rarity ==
These cloths have not been regularly woven in a century, and few exemplars can be found today. It is estimated that there are only 100 to 150 palepai of all kinds still in existence.
