= Komering language =

Austronesian language spoken in Indonesia

Komering
- Basa Kumoring باس كوموريڠ
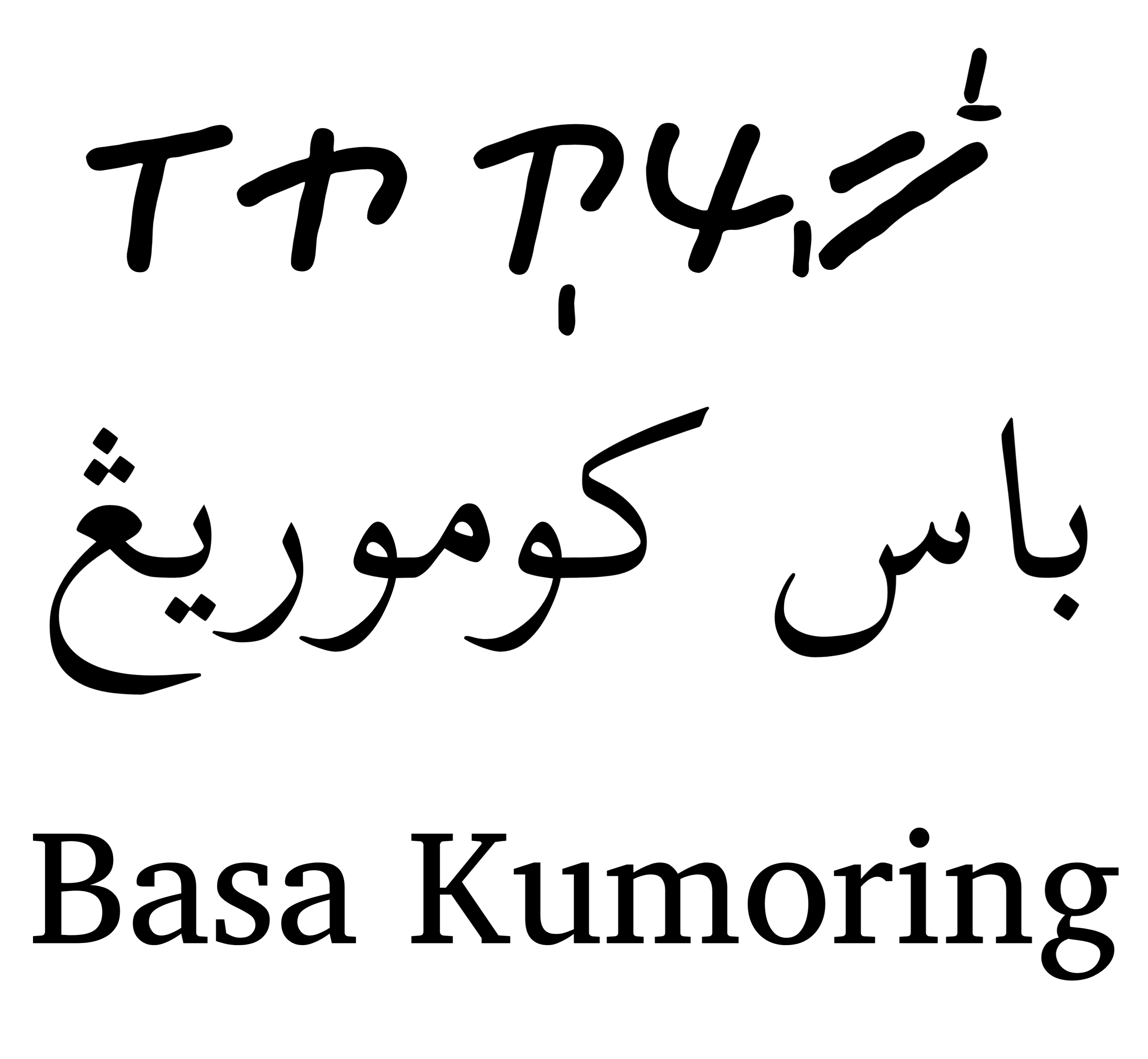
- Pronunciation: [baˈsa ku.mo.ɣiŋ]
- Native to: Indonesia
- Region: South Sumatra
- Ethnicity: Komering
- Native speakers: (470,000 cited 2000 census)
- Language family: Austronesian: Malayo-Polynesian; Lampungic; Komering
- Writing system: Lampung (historical, mainly for Komering Hulu dialect); Latin (present and majority); Komering (present and minority, mainly for Komering Ilir dialect); Jawi (present and minority)

Language codes
- ISO 639-3: kge
- Glottolog: kome1238

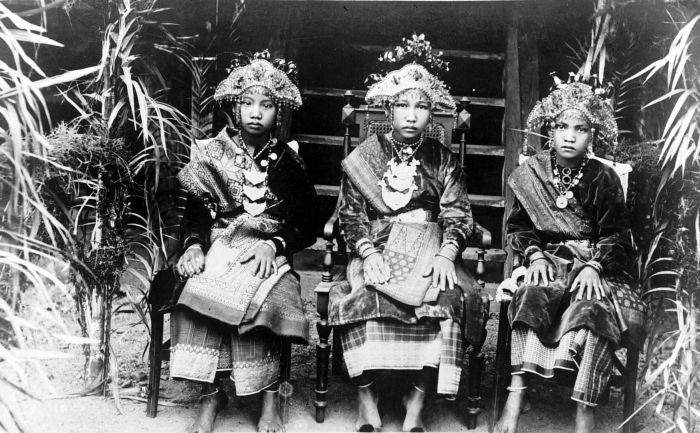
Three Komering girls in 1929

Komering (also spelled Kumering) is a Lampungic language spoken by the Komering people, an indigenous ethnic group native to Komering regions alongside the Komering River in South Sumatra, Indonesia.

== Location ==
Komering is spoken in Lampung Province and South Sumatra Province in southern Sumatra, along the Komering River.

== Classification ==
The Komering language belongs to the Lampungic branch, which is a subgroup within the Austronesian family.

== Phonology ==
=== Consonants ===
		Labial	Alveolar	Palatal	Velar	Glottal
Nasal		m	n	ɲ	ŋ	
Plosive/ Affricate	voiceless	p	t	tʃ	k	ʔ
Plosive/ Affricate	voiced	b	d	dʒ	ɡ	
Fricative			s			h
Lateral			l			
Trill			r			
Approximant		w		j		

A voiced fricative /z/ also occurs, but only as a result of foreign loanwords.

=== Vowels ===
	Front	Central	Back
Close	i		u
Mid			o
Open		a	

== Vocabulary ==
Examples of basic Komering words:

Komering (standard)	Meaning
Kayu	Tree
Habu	Ashes
Tanoh	World
Jukuk	Grass
Hatolui	Egg
Tolu	Three
Hujan	Rain
Hambur	To Steal
Tohlui	Egg
Pak	Four
Ganta	Now
Ompai	New
Sisu	Chicken
Manuk	Bird
Bunga	Flower
Punti	Banana
Punti Kayu	Papaya
Halimawong	Tiger
Iwak	Fish
Turui	Sleep
Batangari	River

== Alphabet ==
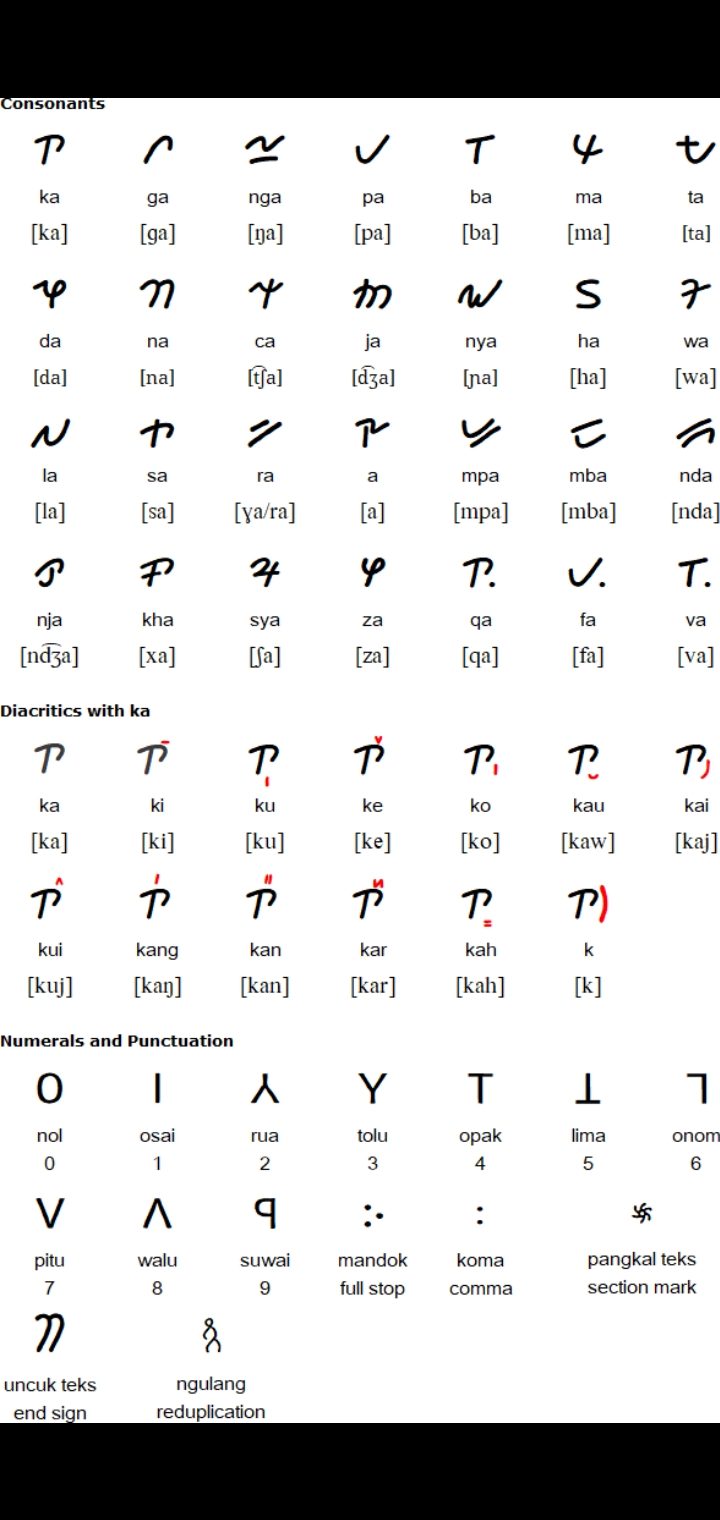
Komering Script

Currently, Komering uses Latin as the general writing system, but there are also a small number of people who still use Jawi Arabic letters. The Komering script was used in ancient times, now there are efforts to preserve this script again.

== Sample text ==
=== Universal Declaration of Human Rights 1 ===
Latin	Kaunyin jolma tilahirko mardeka rik uwat pi'il rik hak-hak sai goh-goh. Tiyan tiunjuk akal pikiran rik hati nurani mari tiyan dapok nyampur rik sai barihna dilom semangat bukolpah.
Arabic	كأوݧين جولما تيلاحير كو مرديكا ريک اوت ڤيئيل ريک حق۲ سي گوه گوه. تيان تيئونجوک اكل ڤيكيرن ريک هاتي نوراني ماري تيان داڤوک ݧامڤور ريک سي باريه ن ديلوم سماڠت بوكولڤه.
IPA	/kaʔuɲin d͡ʒolma tilaˈhiɣko maɣdeka ɣiʔ uwat piʔil ɣiʔ haʔ-haʔ saɪ ɡoh-ɡoh. tijan tiʔund͡ʒuʔ akal pikiˈɣan ɣiʔ hati nuɣani maɣi tijan dapoʔ ɲampuɣ ɣiʔ saɪ baɣihna diˈlom səˈmaŋat buˈkolpah./

== Sources ==
- Adelaar, Alexander, The Austronesian Languages of Asia and Madagascar: A Historical Perspective, The Austronesian Languages of Asia and Madagascar, pp. 1–42, Routledge Language Family Series, Londres, Routledge, 2005, ISBN 0-7007-1286-0
- Walker, Dale F., A Lexical Study of Lampung Dialects, Miscellaneous Studies in Indonesian and Languages in Indonesia, Part I (editor: John W. M. Verhaar), NUSA Linguistic Studies in Indonesian and Languages of Indonesia, Volume 1, pp. 11–21, Jakarta, Badan Penyelenggara Seri NUSA, 1975.
- Walker, Dale F., A Grammar of the Lampung Language: the Pesisir Dialect of Way Lima, NUSA Linguistic Studies in Indonesian and Languages of Indonesia, Volume 2, Jakarta, Badan Penyelenggara Seri NUSA, 1976.
- Sofjan Abdurrahman, and Colin Yallop. A Brief Outline of Komering Phonology and Morphology, Miscellaneous studies in Indonesian and languages in Indonesia, Part VI (editor: Amran Halim), NUSA Linguistic Studies in Indonesian and Languages of Indonesia, Volume 7, pp. 11–18, Jakarta, Universitas Katolik Indonesia Atma Jaya, 1979.
