= Lampung people =

Ethnic group in Indonesia

Jamma Lampung (in Lampung Api) Ulun Lappung (in Lampung Nyo)
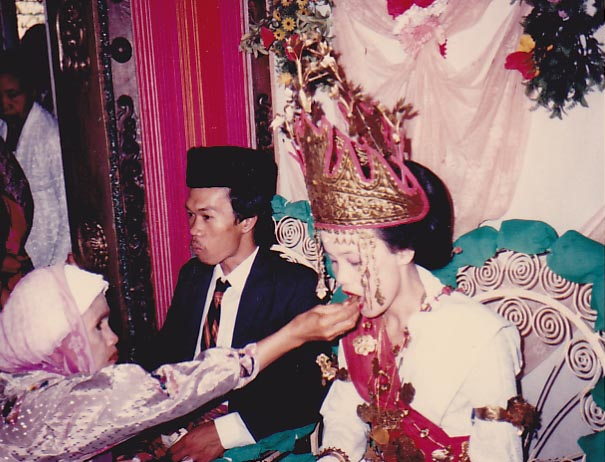
- A Lampung bride and bridegroom in 1987. Both of the couples are of the Sungkai Bungamayang clan. The traditional headgear of the bride, which is called Siger, is commonly used in Lampung weddings.

Regions with significant populations
- Indonesia: 1,381,660
- Lampung: 1,028,190
- West Java: 92,862
- Banten: 69,885
- Jakarta: 45,215
- South Sumatra: 44,983

Languages
- Native: Lampung language; Dialects: Standard Lampung; Lampung Api/Pesisir; Lampung Nyo/Abung; Cikoneng Lampung; Also: Indonesian, Arabic (for religious use); Other: Komering; Javanese; Sundanese; Balinese

Religion
- Predominantly Islam

Related ethnic groups
- Austronesian peoples: Cikoneng Lampung; Abung; Komering; Kayu Agungg

The Lampung (Note: /ˈlæmpʌŋ/ LUM-pung) (Lampung: Jamma Lampung (in Lampung Api), Ulun Lappung (in Lampung Nyo); Indonesian: Orang Lampung) or Lampungese are an indigenous ethnic group native to Lampung and some parts of South Sumatra (especially in Martapura region of East Ogan Komering Ulu Regency, Muaradua district of South Ogan Komering Ulu Regency, Kayu Agung district of Ogan Komering Ilir Regency), Bengkulu (in Merpas district of Kaur Regency), as well as in the southwest coast of Banten (in Cikoneng of Serang Regency). They speak the Lampung language, a Lampungic language estimated to have 1.5 million speakers.

== Origins ==
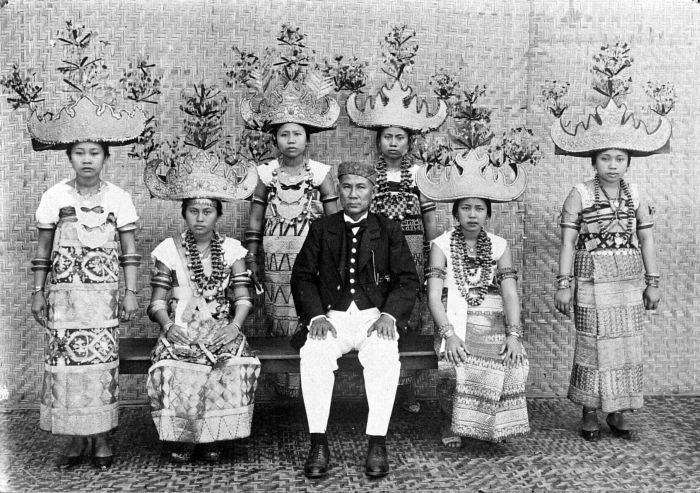
A group of dancing girls with distinguished headdress from Lampung in full regalia, 1929.

The origins of the Lampung people is closely tied to the name of Lampung itself. In the 7th century the Chinese had already mentioned about a place in the south (Nampang) where it is said to be the place of the Tolang Pohwang kingdom, the former kingdom may have covered the area of present day Tulang Bawang Regency and the regions along the Tulang Bawang river, this is supported by Prof. Gabriel Ferrand (1918). There are strong evidence that Lampung was part of the Srivijaya empire with its capital in Jambi and did conquered parts of South East Asia region including Lampung until the 11th century.

In the 5th AD Taiping Huanyu Ji chronicles, names of the Nan-hai (Southern ocean) states were recorded and among them are two states which were mentioned in sequence, To-lang and Po-hwang. The To-lang state was mentioned only once, but the Po-hwang state was mentioned many times as this state did send envoys to China in the year of 442, 449, 451, 459, 464 and 466.

It is said that there is also a Tulangbawang kingdom, although the idea simply came from the unification of the two names in the Chinese chronicles.

== Culture ==
Originally the lineage of the Lampung people came from Sekala Brak kingdom. However, in its customary sense the Lampung people developed and became two people group, namely the Saibatin Lampungs (coastal) and the Pepadun Lampungs (interior). The customs of the Saibatin people are well known for its aristocracy, while the customs of the Pepadun people which emerged later had democratic values developed in opposed to the aristocracy values held by the Saibatin people.

=== Saibatin Lampungs ===
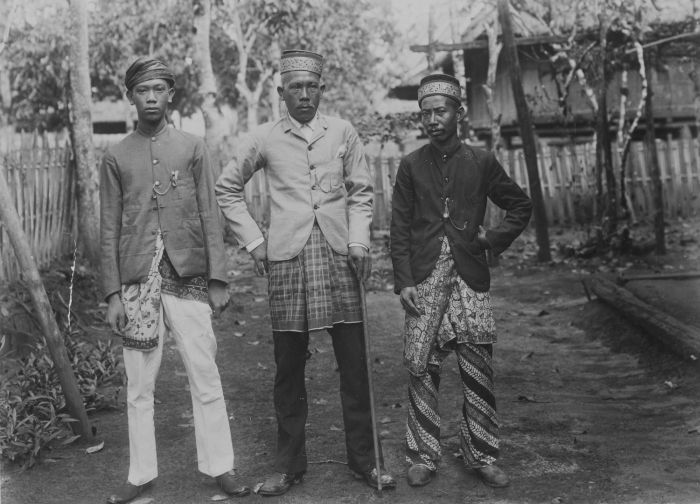
A village head from a village by the Way Umpu river in Lampung, 1901.

The Saibatin Lampungs occupy traditional regions such as Labuhan Maringgai, Pugung, Jabung, Way Jepara, Kalianda, Raja Basa, Teluk Betung, Padang Cermin, Cukuh Balak, Way Lima, Talang Padang, Kota Agung, Semaka, Suoh, Sekincau, Batu Brak, Belalau, Liwa, Pesisir Krui, Ranau, Martapura, Muara Dua, Kayu Agung with four of these cities are in South Sumatra province, Cikoneng in Pantai Banten and including Merpas in South Bengkulu Regency. The Saibatin Lampungs are also often referred to as Pesisir (coastal) Lampungs because majority of them lived along the east, south and west coast of Lampung with each consisting of:-

- Keratuan Melinting (East Lampung Regency)
- Keratuan Darah Putih (South Lampung Regency)
- Keratuan Putih Bandakh Lima Teluk Semaka in Cukuh Balak, Limau, Kelumbayan, Kelumbayan Barat, Kedondong, Way Lima, Way Khilau, Pardasuka, Pardasuka Selatan, Bulok, Talang Padang, Gunung Alif and part of Padang Cermin, Punduh Pedada, Teluk Betung and Kalianda (Tanggamus - Pesawaran - Pringsewu - South Lampung Regency) which consist of:
  - Bandakh Seputih, which are Buay Humakhadatu, Buay TambaKukha, Buay HuluDalung, Buay HuluLutung, Buay Pematu, Buay Akhong and Buay Pemuka
  - Bandakh Sebadak, which is Buay Mesindi (Tengklek)
  - Bandakh Selimau, which are Buay Tungau, Buay Babok and Buay Khandau
  - Bandakh Sepertiwi, which are Buay Sekha, Buay Samba and Buay Aji
  - Bandakh Sekelumbayan, which are Buay Balau (Gagili), Buay Betawang and Buay Bakhuga
- Keratuan Komering (South Sumatra)
- Cikoneng Pak Pekon (Banten)
- Paksi Pak Sekala Brak (West Lampung Regency)

=== Pepadun Lampungs ===
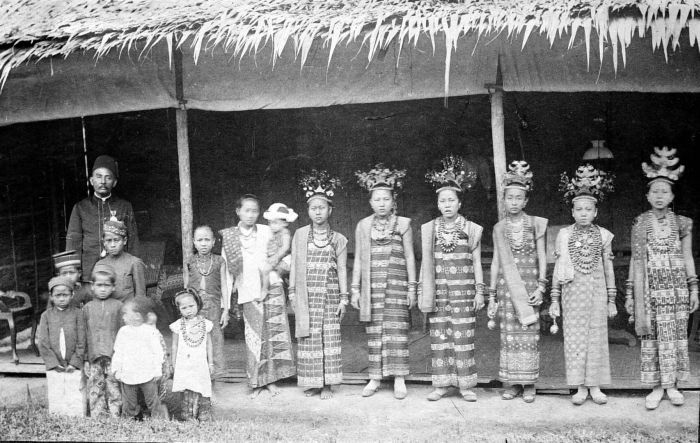
Lampung girls in dance costume at the time of the Dutch East Indies.

The Pepadun Lampungs or Pedalaman (interior) Lampungs consists of:-

- Abung Siwo Mego (Unyai, Unyi, Subing, Uban, Anak Tuha, Kunang, Beliyuk, Selagai, Nyerupa). The Abung people lived in seven traditional regions, which are Kotabumi, Seputih Timur, Sukadana, Labuhan Maringgai, Jabung, Gunung Sugih, and Terbanggi.
- Mego Pak Tulangbawang (Puyang Umpu, Puyang Bulan, Puyang Aji, Puyang Tegamoan). The Tulangbawang people lived in four traditional regions, which are Menggala, Mesuji, Panaragan, and Wiralaga.
- Pubian Telu Suku (Minak Patih Tuha or Manyarakat people, Minak Demang Lanca or Tambapupus people, Minak Handak Hulu or Bukujadi people). The Pubian people lived in eight traditional regions, which are Tanjungkarang, Balau, Bukujadi, Tegineneng, Seputih Barat, Padang Ratu, Gedungtataan, and Pugung.
- Sungkay-Way Kanan Buay Lima (Pemuka, Bahuga, Semenguk, Baradatu, Barasakti, who are the five descendants of Raja Tijang Jungur). The Sungkay-Way Kanan people lived in nine traditional regions, which are Negeri Besar, Ketapang, Pakuan Ratu, Sungkay, Bunga Mayang, Blambangan Umpu, Baradatu, Bahuga, and Kasui.

== Philosophical life ==
The philosophical life of the Lampung people are contained in the Kuntara Raja Niti manuscript, which are:-

- Piil-Pusanggiri: It is an embarrassment to do despised job in accordance to religion and self-esteem.
- Juluk-Adok: A personality that is fitting to the customary title that one bears.
- Nemui-Nyimah: To keep in touch with one another by visiting and by gladly receiving guests.
- Nengah-Nyampur: Active in communal fellowship and not being individualistic.
- Sakai-Sambaian: Give mutual assistance with one another in the community.

The above-mentioned philosophical values are denoted by the symbol of five decorative flowers of the Lampung seal.

The characteristic traits of the Lampung people are expressed in the adi-adi (poems):-
Tandani ulun Lampung, wat piil-pusanggiri
Mulia heno sehitung, wat liom ghega dighi
Juluk-adok gham pegung, nemui-nyimah muaghi
Nengah-nyampugh mak ngungkung, sakai-Sambaian gawi.

== Language ==
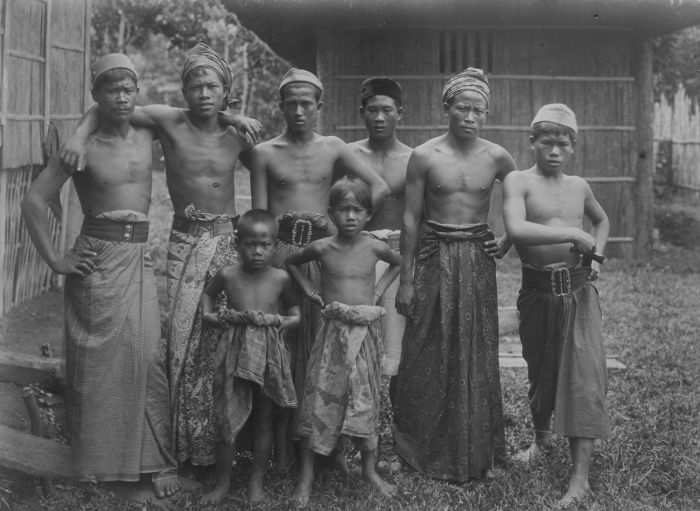
A group of men and children from Negeri Batin village, Blambangan Umpu district, Way Kanan Regency, Lampung, 1901.

The Lampung language is the language used by the Lampung people in Lampung, southern Palembang and the west coast of Banten. This language is classified in its own branch from the western Malayo-Polynesian languages (Lampungic languages) and is most closely related to Malay, Sundanese and Javanese. The Lampung language has two major dialects which is Api and Nyo dialects. The Api dialect are spoken by the people of Sekala Brak, Melinting Maringgai, Darah Putih Rajabasa, Balau Telukbetung, Semaka Kota Agung, Pesisir Krui, Ranau, Komering and Daya (those that practices the Saibatin Lampungs customs), and including Way Kanan, Sungkai and Pubian (those that practices Pepadun Lampungs customs). The Nyo dialect are used by the people of Abung and Tulangbawang (those that practices Pepadun Lampungs customs). According to Dr. Van Royen, there are two classification of the Lampung language which are the Belalau dialect or Api dialect and the Abung dialect or Nyo dialect. Komering, spoken by the Komering is also part of Lampungic languages but mostly considered an independent language of its own, separate from proper Lampung as the Komering people have a different culture from Lampung people.

== Lampung script ==
Lampung script that is referred to as Had Lampung is a form of writing that is related to the Pallawa script from South India. Just like a form of syllable-based phonetic writing similar to the vowels as used in Arabic letters by using the sign of fathah at the top row and the sign of kasrah at the bottom row but does not use the sign of dammah on the front row unless the mark is used at the back, with each mark has its own name.

This shows that Lampung script is influenced by two elements, namely the Pallawa script and Arabic script. The Lampung script also has a form of kinship with Rencong script, Rejang script, Bengkulu script and Bugis script. Had Lampung consists of main letters, sub-letters, double letters and consonant clusters, as well as also symbols, numbers and punctuation. Lampung script is also referred to as KaGaNga, a term for a script that is written and read in a direction from left to right with 20 main letters.

The traditional Lampung script has undergone changes throughout history, becoming less complex than the ancient version. This refined version is what is taught in schools today.

== Notable Lampung people ==
Statesmen and politicians:

- Aburizal Bakrie
- Ryamizard Ryacudu
- Bagir Manan
- Siti Nurbaya Bakar
- Erick Thohir

Professional practitioners:

- Julian Aldrin Pasha

Reporters and journalists:

- Udo Z. Karzi

Freedom fighters:

- Radin Inten II (Keratuan Darah Putih)
