= Taiping Huanyu Ji =

10th-century Chinese geographical treatise

- Traditional Chinese: 太平寰宇記
- Simplified Chinese: 太平寰宇记
Transcriptions
Standard Mandarin
- Hanyu Pinyin: Tàipíng Huányǔ Jì
Yue: Cantonese
- Jyutping: Taai^{3} Ping^{4} Waan^{4} Yu^{5} Gei^{3}

The Taiping Huanyu Ji (Chinese: 太平寰宇記), or "Universal Geography of the Taiping (Xingguo) Era [976–983]," is a 10th-century AD geographical treatise by Chinese scholar Yue Shi 樂史 (930–1007), written during the reign of Emperor Taizong of Song in the Northern Song dynasty. Comprising 200 scrolls (or volumes), it has entries for nearly all areas of China at the time of its publication, complete with place-names and their etymologies. The work generally follows Tang dynasty systems of geographical and political designation, dividing China into 13 "Circuits" (Chinese: 道; pinyin: dào), and then subdividing further into the more traditional "prefectures" (Chinese: 州; pinyin: zhōu) and "counties" (simplified Chinese: 县; traditional Chinese: 縣; pinyin: xiàn). Because it is largely based on Tang works, it constitutes an important source for the study of Tang geography.

The Taiping Huanyu Ji generally records places' populations, notable landmarks and religious or ceremonial structures, customs, and basic historical information, sometimes adding details not found in Sima Qian's Records of the Grand Historian, China's most renowned historical treatise. It also set the trend for including biographies, literary citations, and other material in Chinese geographical works. It should not be confused with Taiping Yulan or Taiping Guangji, which were compiled around the same era.
