= 1926 Padang Panjang earthquakes =

Earthquakes in West Sumatra, Indonesia

1926 Padang Panjang earthquake
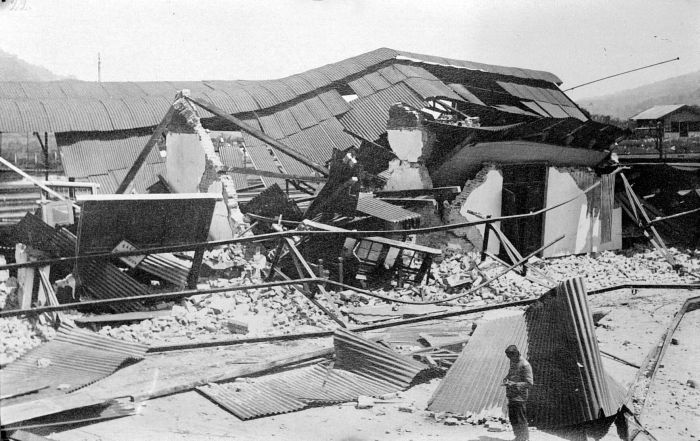
- Structure in Padang Panjang toppled after the earthquake

- Location within Sumatra Location within Indonesia
- UTC time: Doublet earthquake:
- A: 1926-06-28 03:23:28
- B: 1926-06-28 06:15:48
- ISC event
- A: 909897
- B: 909898
- USGS-ANSS
- A: ComCat
- B: ComCat
- Local date: June 28, 1926
- Local time
- A: 10:23:28
- B: 13:15:48
- Magnitude
- A: 6.7 M_{s}
- B: 6.4 M_{s}
- Depth
- A: 15.0 km
- B: 35.0 km
- Epicenter: 0.629°S 100.155°E
- Fault: Great Sumatran fault
- Type: Strike-slip
- Areas affected: Sumatra, Indonesia
- Max. intensity: MMI IX (Violent)
- Casualties: 411 dead

West Sumatra, Dutch East Indies (today Indonesia) was struck by an earthquake doublet on June 28, 1926. The first earthquake occurred at 10:23 local time, with an estimated magnitude of 6.7 on the surface-wave magnitude scale with an intensity of IX (Violent) on the Modified Mercalli Intensity Scale. Less than three hours later, a second earthquake occurred with a magnitude of 6.4 M_{s} although it appears to have been less damaging. The first earthquake killed 354 people, with later shocks killing a total of 57 according to local records.

== Tectonic setting ==
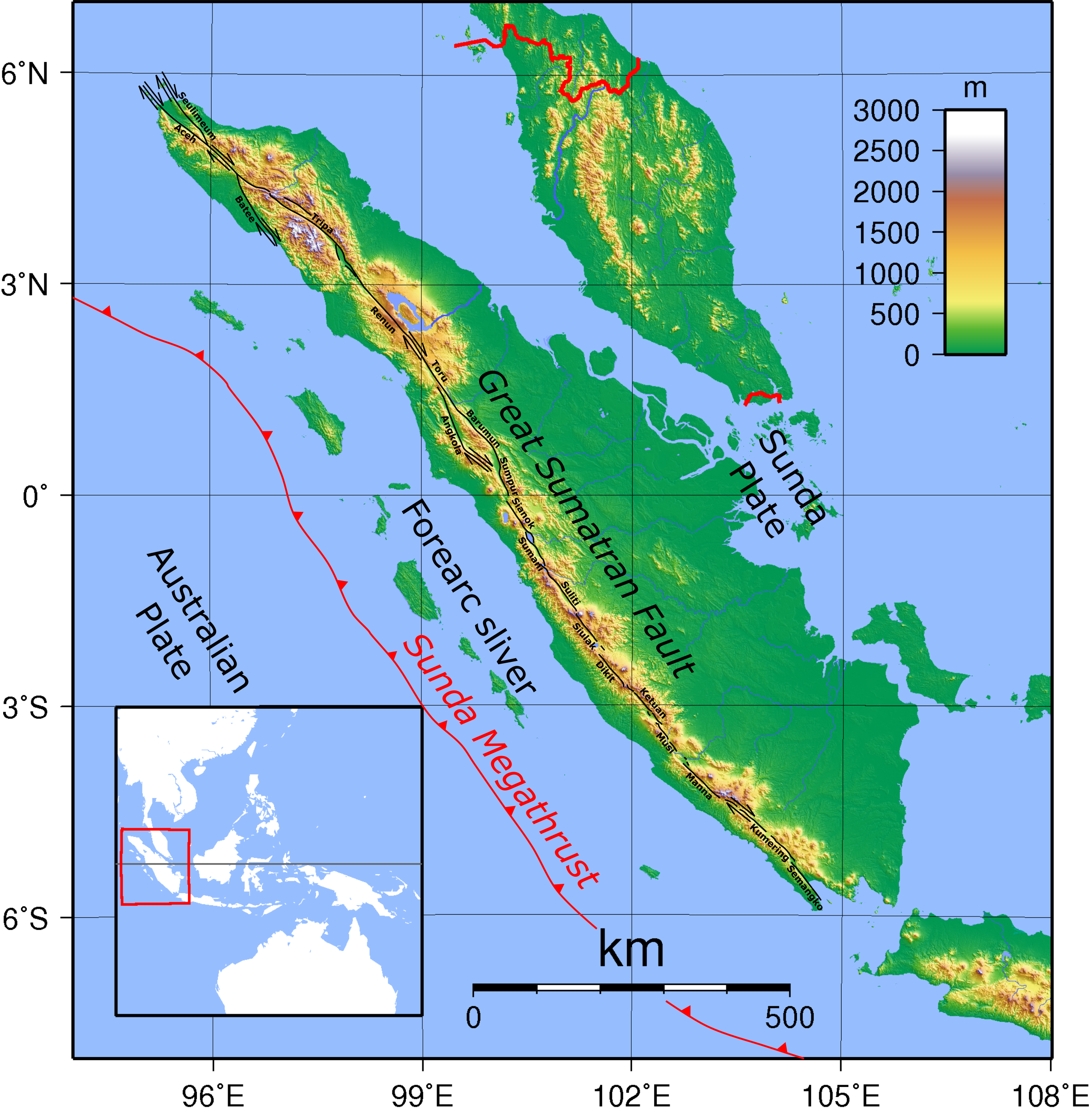
Map of the Great Sumatran Fault with labeled segments

The Great Sumatran fault 1900 km in length is a major strike-slip fault zone that cuts through the island of Sumatra. It accommodates the right-lateral strike-slip component of the highly oblique collision zone between the Indo-Australian plate and the Sunda plate. The Sunda megathrust carries the dip-slip component of the collision with the upper portion of the over-riding plate separated from the Sumatran fault zone by a small crustal sliver near the volcanic arc. The Great Sumatran fault is considered an example of slip partitioning. The fault runs through the north in Banda Aceh and ends in the south near the Sunda Strait. The Fault runs northwestward with ranging slip rates of 38 ± 4 mm/yr commonly cited for Aceh, however, some geodetic data believe that the elastic strain in the area is at around 16 ± 6 mm/yr and 20 ± 6 mm/yr across the parallel Aceh and Seulimeum segments from 2005 to 2010. In the Sianok segments, near the epicenter of the 1926 event, it is proposed to have slip rates of 10–11 mm/yr as well as 27–28 mm/yr for the Renun segment near Toba. The latter proposes that it has a slip rate of about 23 ± 3 mm/yr based on the deflections of the rivers nearby the young Toba tuff. The Toru segment has a slip rate of 7–14 mm/yr which also traverses near the Sibuabuali volcano. The Angkola segment, parallel to the Toru segment, observe slip-rates of about 17 ± 6 mm/yr. In the south, the slip-rates of the Musi segment have a recorded geological slip-rate of 11 ± 5 mm/yr and lastly, the slip-rates for the Kumering segment were a preliminary 6 ± 4 mm/yr, later revised to 5.5 ± 1.9 mm/yr. In total, the slip rate of the Sumatran Fault System at this latitude could be greater than the reliably constrained minimum slip rate of 7–14 mm/yr.

Throughout the years, many destructive earthquakes have occurred as caused by the different segments of the Great Sumatran fault such as the 1943 Alahan Panjang earthquakes in the same region as the 1926 event, the 1994 Liwa earthquake from the Kumering segment in the south, the 1995 Kerinci earthquake from the Siulak segment, and the most recent event, the March 2007 Sumatra earthquakes from the Toru segment.

== Earthquake ==
The first earthquake occurred at 10:23 am local time with a magnitude 6.7 on the surface-wave magnitude scale. It was widely felt across the entirety of Western Sumatra. The earthquake produced many surface displacements and also caused a rupture from Alahan Panjang to Lake Singkarak.

=== Second earthquake ===
Just under three hours later, at 13:15 am local time, a second earthquake occurred, with the two earthquakes being interpreted as a doublet. It measured 6.4 on the surface-wave magnitude scale. The second tremor was not said to have caused any major casualties and due to the limited amount of information about this second earthquake, it was overshadowed by the first earthquake. The second tremor also caused a rupture from Lake Singkarak to Sipisang.

== Impacts ==
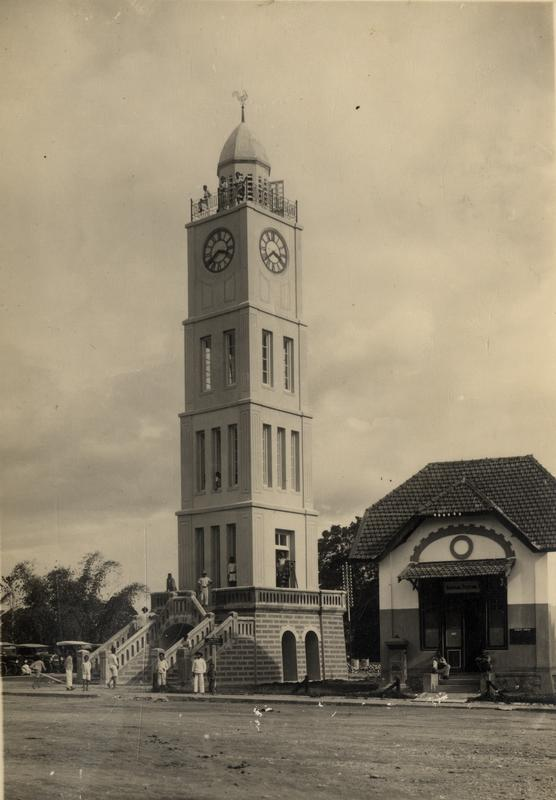
The Jam Gadang tower in 1935

The earthquake occurred during the Padang Panjang week, a market day that is held twice a week; Monday and Friday. As the local Minangkabau people in the area were doing there day-to-day activities as well as participating in the market day they would be interrupted and maybe the reason as to the many casualties from the event. Most of the buildings that would later be destroyed from the earthquake were built with mostly rocks and stones. One of the most popular icons in Bukittinggi, the Jam Gadang clock tower had tilted by 30 degrees while it was still under construction. Eyewitnesses say that the tower shook violently as the earthquake was ongoing. A report says that a total of 2,383 houses had collapsed from the first earthquake, and a further 472 houses also collapsed as a result of the aftershocks that followed after the mainshock. A total of 354 people died on that day as well as an additional 57 people who died from the continuing aftershocks.

The earthquakes destroyed the Diniyah Putri building, an Islamic school for girls which had been founded by Rahmah el Yunusiyah in 1923. The classes met in makeshift buildings for several years and Muhammadiyah approached her with an offer to take over the operation of the school and help to reestablish it; she decided not to accept the offer. She toured widely in the Indies to raise money and a new permanent building was built and opened in 1928.

=== Religious implications ===
The locals mostly remember the earthquake as a sign of doomsday and as a punishment from God to the sinners. Many Muslims regularly prayed and continued to ask for forgiveness. The earthquake resulted in an increasing number of people who began to worship Islam. However, the supposed belief eventually wore off as the years went by and the expected doomsday never occurred.

== Gallery ==
Severe damage from the earthquake

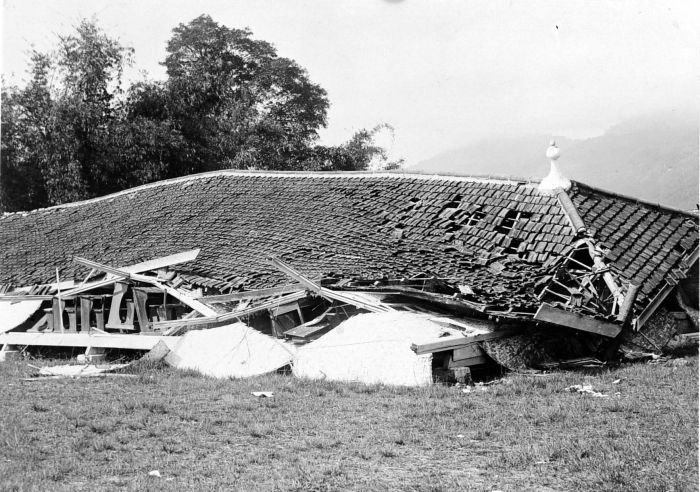

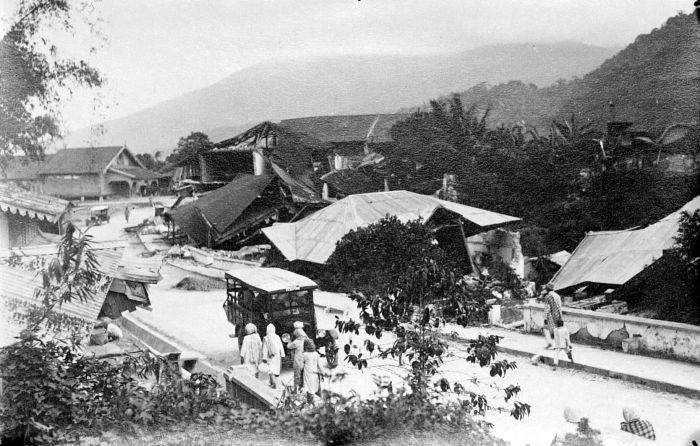

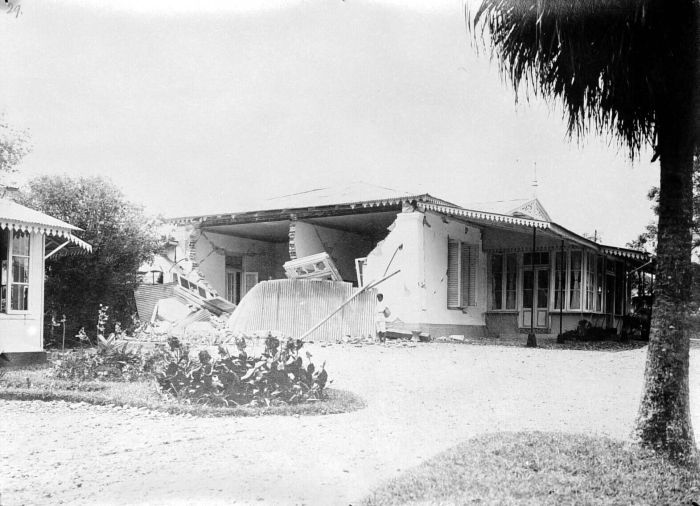

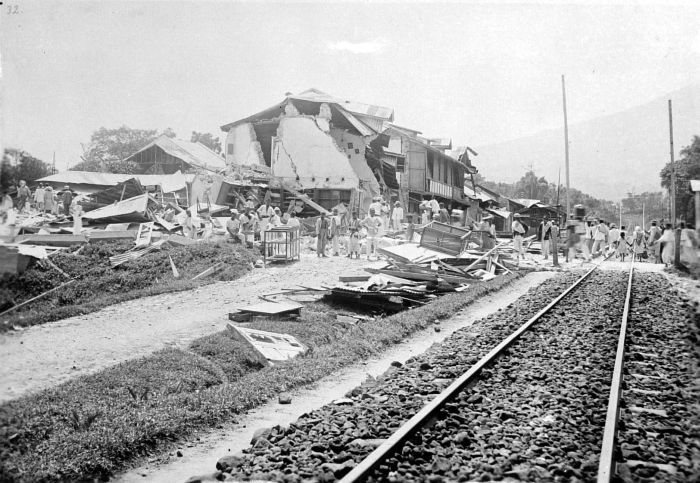

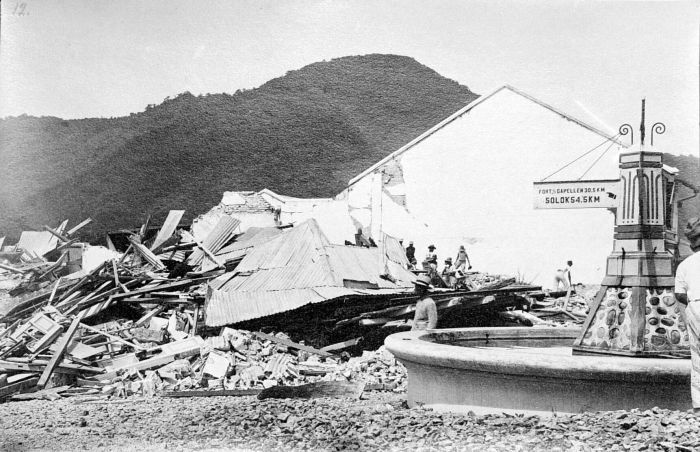

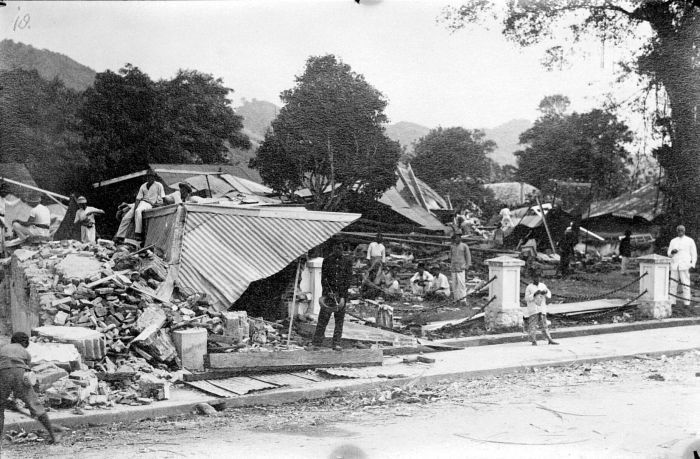

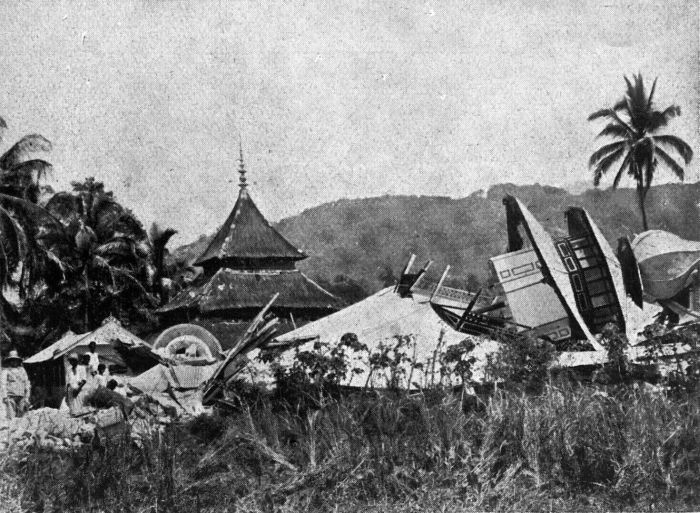

== See also ==
- 1943 Alahan Panjang earthquakes
- Great Sumatran fault
- List of earthquakes in 1926
- List of earthquakes in Indonesia
