= 1909 Kerinci earthquake =

Earthquake in Indonesia

- Location within Sumatra
- UTC time: 1909-06-03 18:40:43
- ISC event: 16958038
- USGS-ANSS: ComCat
- Local date: June 4, 1909
- Local time: 01:40 WIB
- Magnitude: 7.6 M_{w}
- Depth: 35 km (22 mi)
- Epicenter: 2.0°S 101.0°E
- Fault: Great Sumatran fault
- Type: Strike-slip
- Areas affected: Dutch East Indies
- Casualties: 195–200 fatalities

The 1909 Kerinci earthquake struck Sumatra, Dutch East Indies (present-day Indonesia) on June 4 at 01:40 WIB. The shock measured M_{w} 7.6 and occurred along the Great Sumatran fault. Damage was extensive and great around the Kerinci area; many homes collapsed and roads were damaged. The death toll stood at between 195 and 230.

== Tectonic setting ==
The Sunda megathrust off the west coast of Sumatra is a 5,500 km (3,400 mi) long convergent boundary where the Australian Plate subducts beneath the Burma Plate and Sunda Plate at a rate of 60 mm (2.4 in) per year. Convergence along the plate boundary is highly oblique, severely deforming the overriding Sunda Plate, where it is accommodated by strike-slip motion along the Great Sumatran fault. The Great Sumatran fault is a 1,900 km (1,200 mi)-long strike-slip fault system located on Sumatra. The fault is divided into about 20 segments. Earthquakes associated with segments of the fault occurred 1933, 1943, 1994, 1995 and 2022.

== Earthquake ==
The earthquake had an epicenter near the Suliti and Siulak segments. It was associated with rupture along the 70 km (43 mi) Siulak segment of the Great Sumatran fault. The Siulak segment also ruptured during the M_{w} 6.7 earthquake of 1995.

== Damage ==
Damage to roads, houses, rice barns and other buildings was extensive along the Siulak segment. The official government reported 195 people died, 4,384 buildings destroyed and 7,261 buildings badly damaged. At Dusun Lolo, few homes remained intact; irrigation channels at Lempur flooded. A road between Sebukar and Semerah was offset by 12 m (39 ft). Another road between Jujun and Lolo was offset by 3 m (9.8 ft). Land subsidence occurred at Sungai Full, Semurup, Siulak Deras and Lubuk Nagodang. The rice fields from Sebukar to Seleman subsided and were submerged under water. Hamlets at Semurup subsided and residents had to evacuate. Subsidence at Lake Kerinci caused water to flood homes. Building collapses triggered fires.

Widespread landslides affected a river and changed its course. Some tributaries of the Siulak River dried. Landslides at Lake Kerinci buried many areas of rice fields. At Lolo Kecil, a small lake appeared. The hot springs at Semurup widened by 20 m (66 ft) while new hot springs emerged.

Stone buildings cracked and tilted; pillars fractured but did not fall at Padang. In Solok, homes cracked and frightened residents ran outside. At Jambi and Bajunglentjin, shutters rattled, lamps swayed and furniture shook. On Pandang Island, the lighthouse buzzed and oil splashed from a reservoir. Shaking was felt at Pajakumbuh, Pakanbaru, Djebus, Tandjungpinang and Palembang. In Singapore, residents were awaken by vibrations and creaking noises. A rumble was heard and some frightened residents fled to the streets.

== Aftermath ==
Residents constructed tents on the edges of their rice fields. There was insufficient tents to accommodate the homeless and the soil where these tents were constructed above were damp and harbored diseases. In response the Dutch East Indies government built huts which were leveled above the ground. They also used funds from the home affairs department to repair damaged buildings.

== See also ==
- List of earthquakes in 1909
- List of earthquakes in Indonesia
