= 2022 Sumatra earthquake =

Earthquake in Indonesia

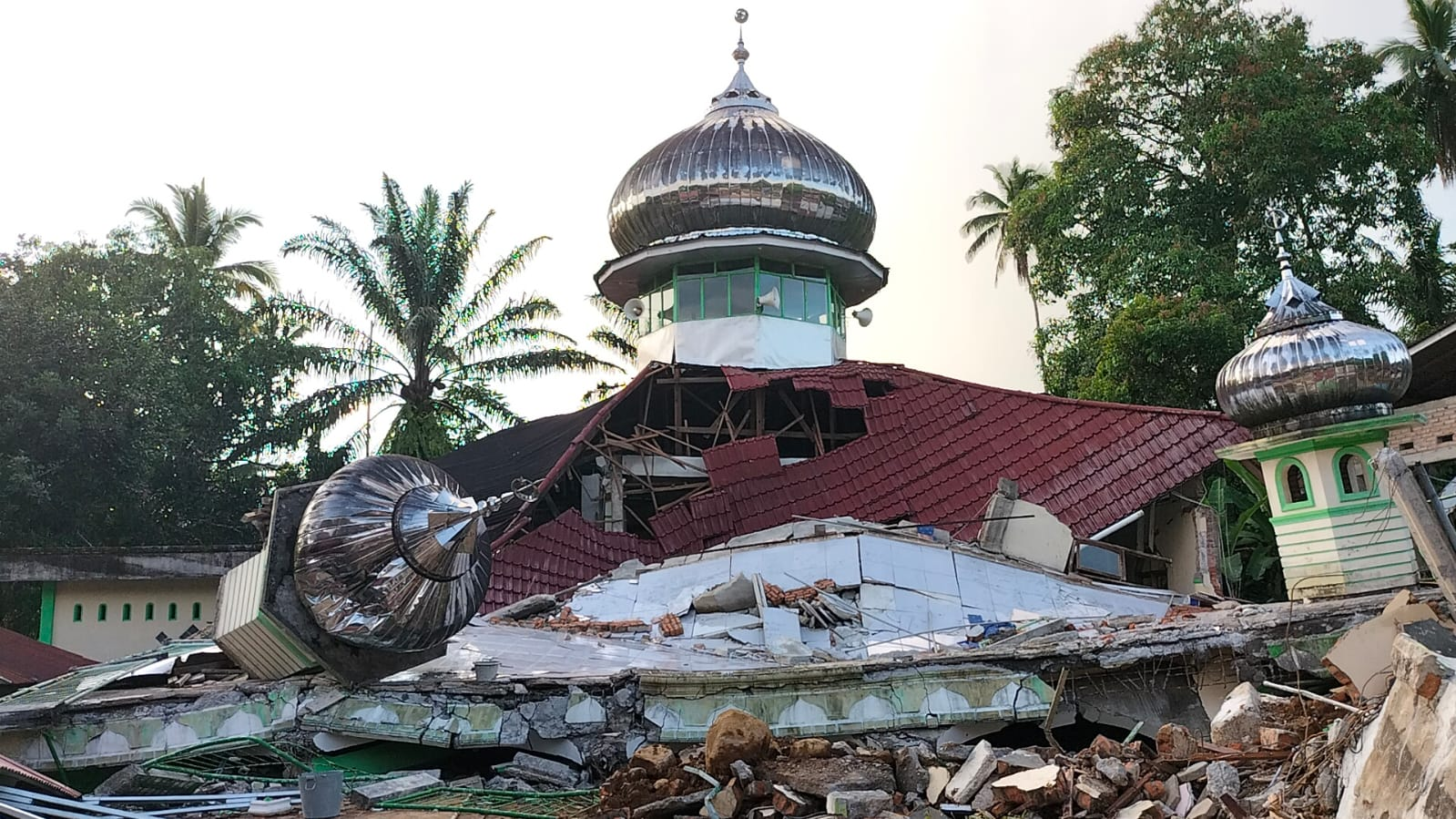
- Ruins of the Raya Kajai mosque

- Location within Sumatra
- UTC time: 2022-02-25 01:39:27
- ISC event: 622071228
- USGS-ANSS: ComCat
- Local date: 25 February 2022
- Local time: 08:39:27 WIB (UTC+7)
- Magnitude: 6.2 M_{w}
- Depth: 4.0 km (2 mi)
- Epicenter: 0.233°N 100.106°E
- Fault: Great Sumatran fault
- Type: Strike-slip
- Areas affected: West Sumatra, Indonesia
- Total damage: Rp 780 million (US$55,000)
- Max. intensity: MMI VIII (Severe)
- Foreshocks: 1
- Aftershocks: 201
- Casualties: 27 dead, 457 injured, 19,221 displaced

On 25 February 2022 at 08:39 WIB, a moment magnitude (M_{w}) 6.2 earthquake struck West Sumatra, Indonesia at a depth of 4.0 km (2.5 mi). Preceded by one foreshock and followed by over 200 aftershocks, the mainshock had an epicenter at the foot of Mount Talakmau in Pasaman Regency. The mainshock was the result of strike-slip faulting along a previously unidentified segment of the Great Sumatran Fault. At least 27 people died, 457 were injured, and 19,221 others were displaced. It inflicted 780 million rupiahs (IDR, US$55,000) worth of damage. The heaviest damage was recorded at three villages around Mount Talakmau. Landslides and flash floods caused additional damage and casualties.

== Tectonic setting ==
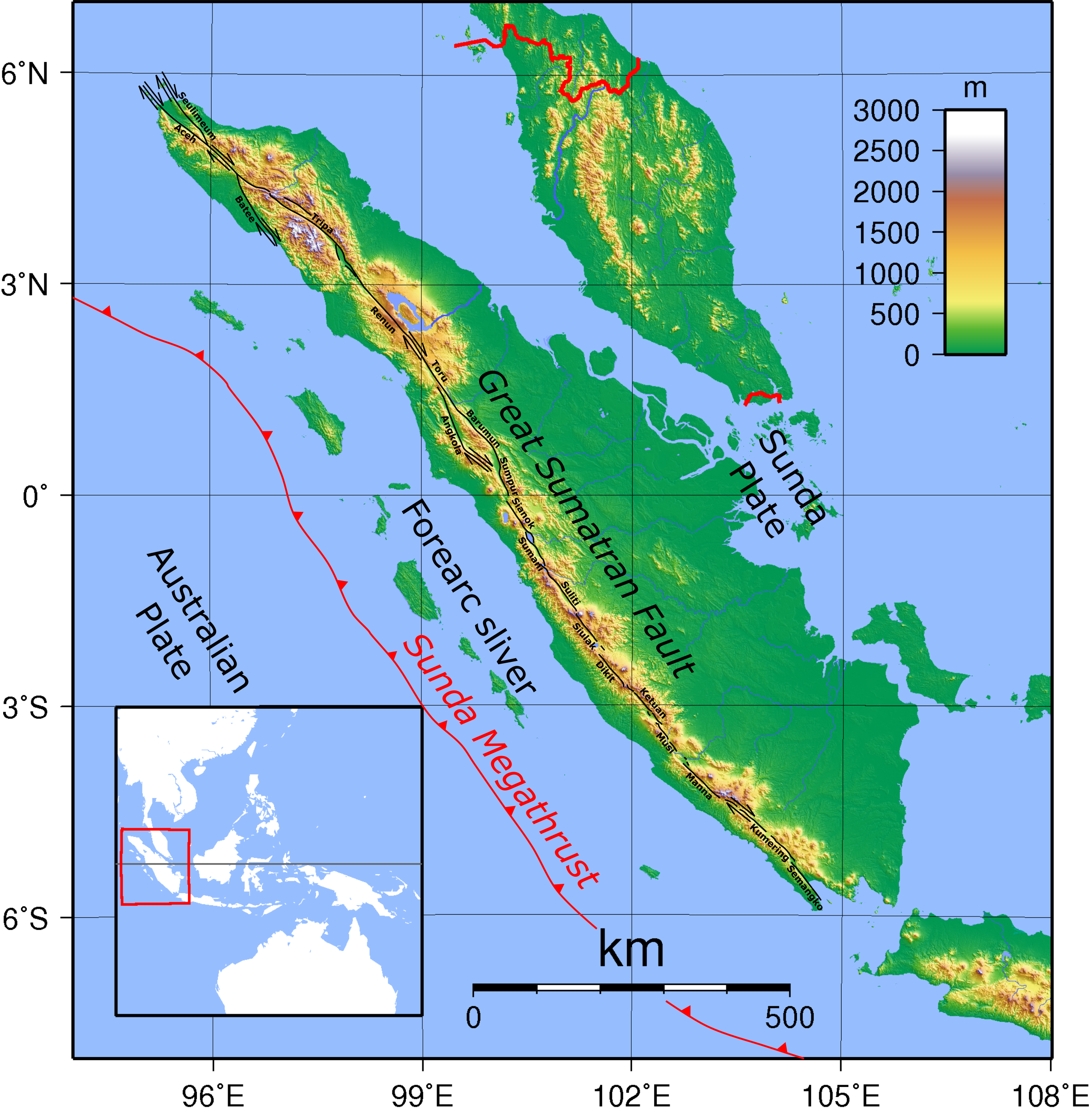
Great Sumatra fault

The west coast of Sumatra is dominated by the Sunda megathrust; a 5,500 km (3,400 mi) long convergent boundary where the Australian plate subducts beneath the Burma plate and Sunda plate at a rate of 60 mm (2.4 in) per year. The subduction zone offshore Sumatra was responsible for several large earthquakes in 2004 and 2005. The subduction plate interface can rupture to the trench, triggering large tsunamis such as in 1907, 2004 and 2010.

Dip-slip faults can rupture within the down going Australian plate as well—the 2009 magnitude 7.6 earthquake near Padang was caused by reverse faulting at about 80 km (50 mi) depth.

Convergence along this plate boundary is highly oblique, severely deforming the overriding Sunda plate, where it is accommodated by strike-slip motion along the Great Sumatran fault. The Great Sumatran fault is a 1,900 km (1,200 mi)-long strike-slip fault system located on Sumatra. The fault is divided into about 20 segments. It was the source of the 1994 Liwa and 1995 Kerinci earthquakes. In 1933, a magnitude 7.5 earthquake struck Liwa, killing many people and causing widespread damage. It produced its largest earthquake in 1943; measuring M_{s} 7.8.

== Earthquake ==
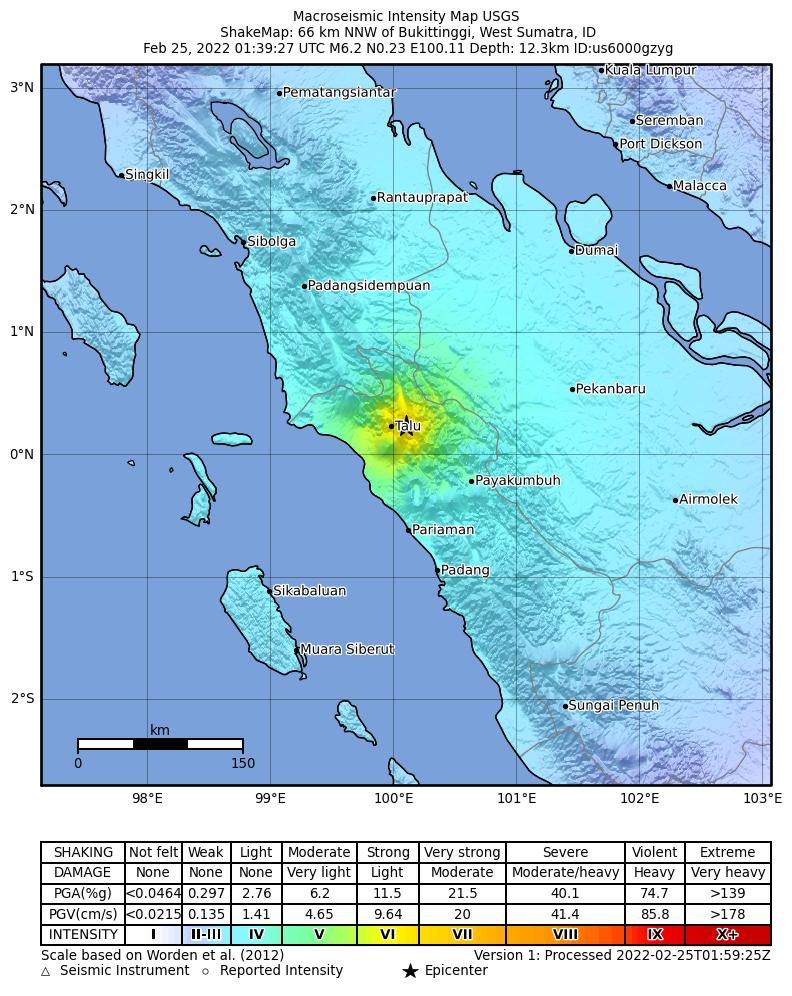
A strong ground motion map of the mainshock

The mainshock occurred on 25 February with an epicenter on the slopes of Mount Talakmau. It was the result of right-lateral strike-slip faulting associated with rupture along a segment of the Great Sumatran Fault. A maximum Modified Mercalli intensity (MMI) of VIII (Severe) was felt over a northwest–southeast trending area. MMI VIII was felt on the northern slopes of Mount Talamau, and in parts of Talamau and Pasaman districts. It was also felt along the eastern portion of the volcano. In Malaysia and Singapore, it was felt MMI II (Weak). The mainshock was preceded by a M_{w} 5.1 foreshock. By 3 March, 201 aftershocks over 1.3 in magnitude had been recorded by the Meteorology, Climatology, and Geophysical Agency (BMKG). Two aftershocks measured M_{w} 5.0.

The earthquake ruptured a previously unidentified segment of the Great Sumatran Fault; the segment is called the Kajai Fault or Talamau Fault. The BMKG initially misidentified the Angkola Fault, another segment of the Great Sumatran Fault, as the source. The aftershock distribution suggest rupture occurred on a strand that extended north of the Sianok Fault, another segment of the Great Sumatran Fault. The newly identified segment is located between the Angkola Fault in the north and the Sianok Fault in the south, and can only produce earthquakes of up to 6.2 magnitude due to its short length. It strikes northwest–southeast and dips steeply to the southwest; and has a length of about 20 km (12 mi). The 10-second-long rupture occurred at 2–11 km (1.2–6.8 mi) depth along 14 km (8.7 mi) of the fault at the northern portion of Mount Talakmau. It displayed an average slip of about 25 cm (9.8 in); slip was 53 cm (21 in) at its maximum occurring at 7.2 km (4.5 mi) depth.

== Impact ==
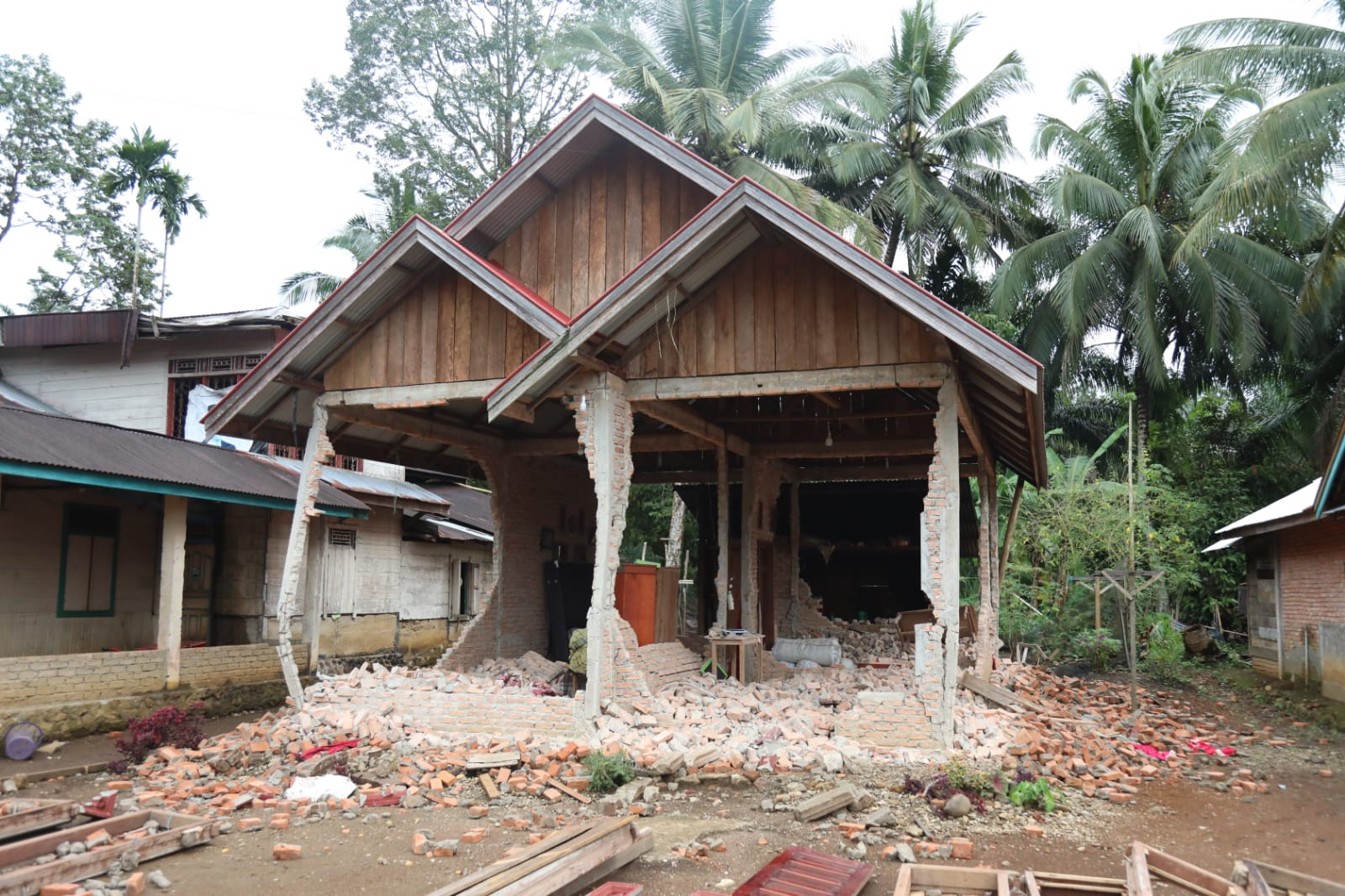
House damaged by the earthquake in Pasaman Regency

A survey by the Indonesian National Board for Disaster Management (BNPB), revealed 1,075 seriously damaged, 3,447 moderately damaged, and 2,105 slightly damaged homes. In addition, 70 religious buildings, 208 educational facilities, and 25 health facilities were also damaged. The total cost of damage was at an estimated 780 million Indonesian rupiahs (Rp). The worst affected villages were located on the northern slopes of Mount Talamau; Kajai, Talamau District and Aua Kuniang, Pasaman District. Malampah, Tigo Nagari District on the eastern flank of Mount Talamau was also badly affected. In these areas, buildings were moderately to heavily damaged.

At least 27 people were killed and 457 were injured. Although most victims died in collapsed buildings, some were killed by landslides on Mount Talakmau. At least 52 people sustained serious injuries—45 in West Pasaman Regency, 5 in Pasaman Regency and 1 in Agam Regency. Many of the injured were treated at Yarsi Hospital. A further 19,221 people were displaced. At least 5,000 displaced residents sought refuge across 35 evacuation centers.

A video footage of mobilized landmass was recorded at Malampah. The phenomena was classified as a type of flash flood which occurred due to a breached landslide dam. The earthquake triggered a landslide on the Batang Kapa River upstream, creating a natural dam which obstructed the flow of water. The dam was breached and a flash flood occurred, carrying debris downstream. An official from the BNPB said a similar phenomena was also observed during the 2009 earthquake. An additional 17 landslides occurred on the slopes of Mount Talakmau. A landslide in Jorong Sungai Siriah measured 6 m (20 ft) high and 30 m (98 ft) wide. In Labuah Kaciak, hot springs appeared in the ground ejecting water and mud; residents were advised not to approach the area by the BNPB. The presence of hot springs were the result of geothermal activity along a fault.

The earthquake was felt in the Klang Valley of Kuala Lumpur, Malaysia. Some residents and workers rushed out of their homes and offices. Workers were evacuated from the Bernama headquarters in the city. In Port Dickson, a private hospital and government building sustained light damage. Minor damage was also reported to a government building in Malacca. Shaking was also felt in Singapore, where residents reported tremors in Punggol, Simei, Redhill, Queenstown, Ang Mo Kio and Kallang. There were also reports of shaking in the Marina Bay Financial Centre.

== Aftermath ==
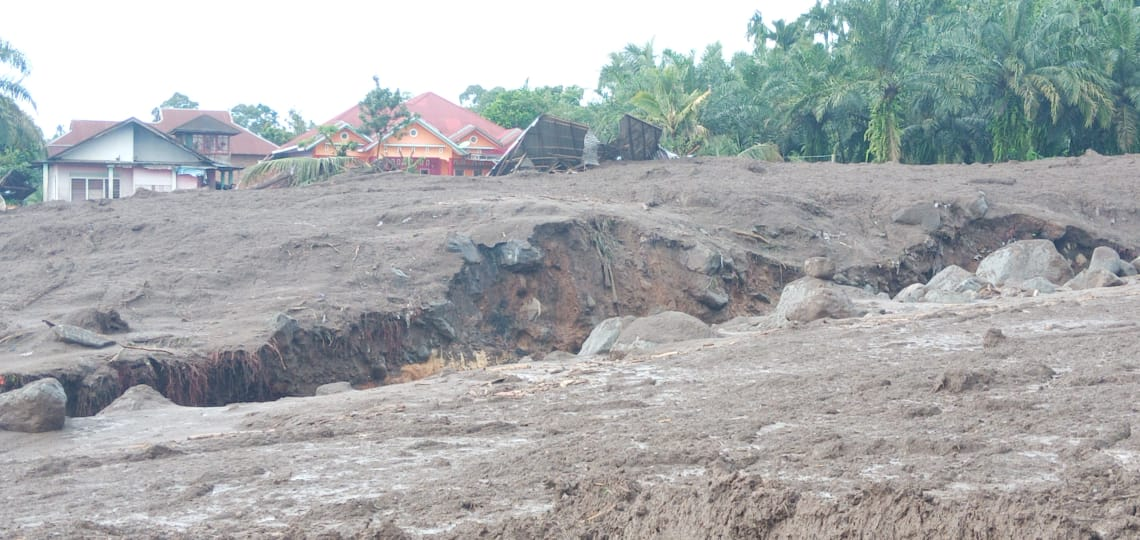
A landslide in Tigo Nagari District, Pasaman Regency

Rescuers were deployed to landslide-affected areas to search for the missing. They also salvaged through rubble. On 1 March, rescuers safely evacuated five individuals trapped under a landslide which occurred in Nagari Kajai, Talamau District. The injured were transported to hospitals in the province. Bodies were also retrieved from the landslides. On 28 February, a disaster relief volunteer experienced a seizure and died.

The BNPB warned residents about the potential for flash floods. Rivers in the affected area had dried up due to blockage upstream caused by landslides. Residents were urged to stay away from hilly areas due to the threat of landslides and rockslides from rain. Smoke was observed emitting from Mount Talakmau. The BNPB confirmed volcanic activity on the volcano and some residents were evacuated as a precautionary measure.

Minister of Social Affairs, Tri Rismaharini, visited some evacuation centers. According to her, logistics distributed 2,000 packs of ready-to-eat food. Additional aid including tents and sanitary kits were also transported. The families of individuals killed were compensated Rp 15 million as a form of assistance. President Joko Widodo ordered the deployment of humanitarian aid consisting of sugar, oil, rice, biscuits, mineral water and tea bags, among other necessities via trucks.

Homes that were slightly damaged would be repaired by the district government body. Moderate to heavily damaged homes would be rebuilt by the provincial and central government, respectively. In October 2022, the BNPB assisted in repairing 1,111 homes in West Pasaman Regency through the provision of Rp 27 billion to the local government. Assistance in Rp 50 million, 20 million and 3–5 million were allocated to homes with heavy, moderate and light damage, respectively. On 19 October, construction began for a damaged mosque in West Pasaman Regency under a Rp 800 million budget.

== See also ==
- List of earthquakes in 2022
- List of earthquakes in Indonesia
- List of earthquakes in Malaysia
