= Pesisir Barat Regency =

Regency in Lampung, Indonesia

Pesisir Barat Regency Kabupaten Pesisir Barat
- Regency
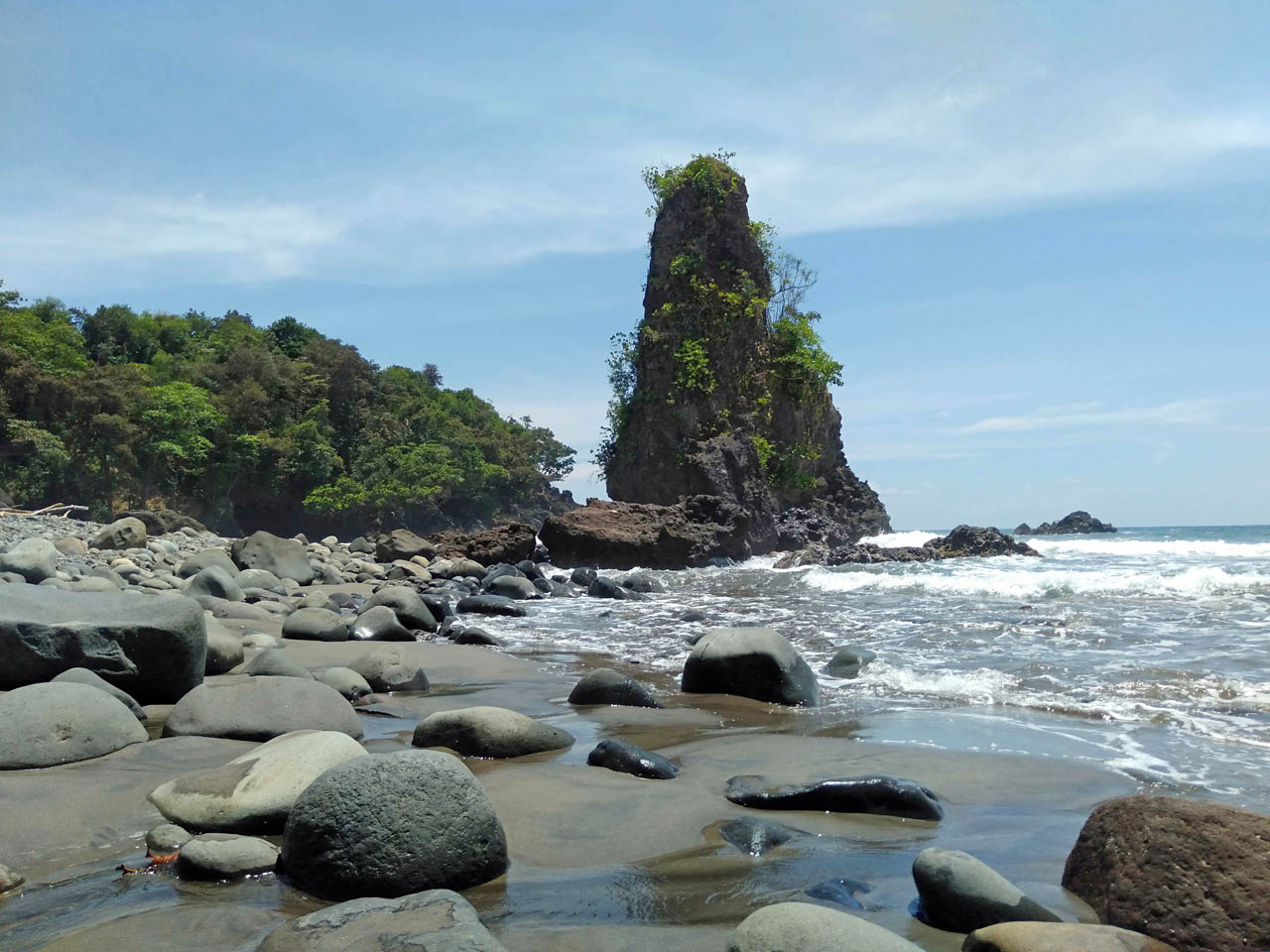
- Batu Tihang beach

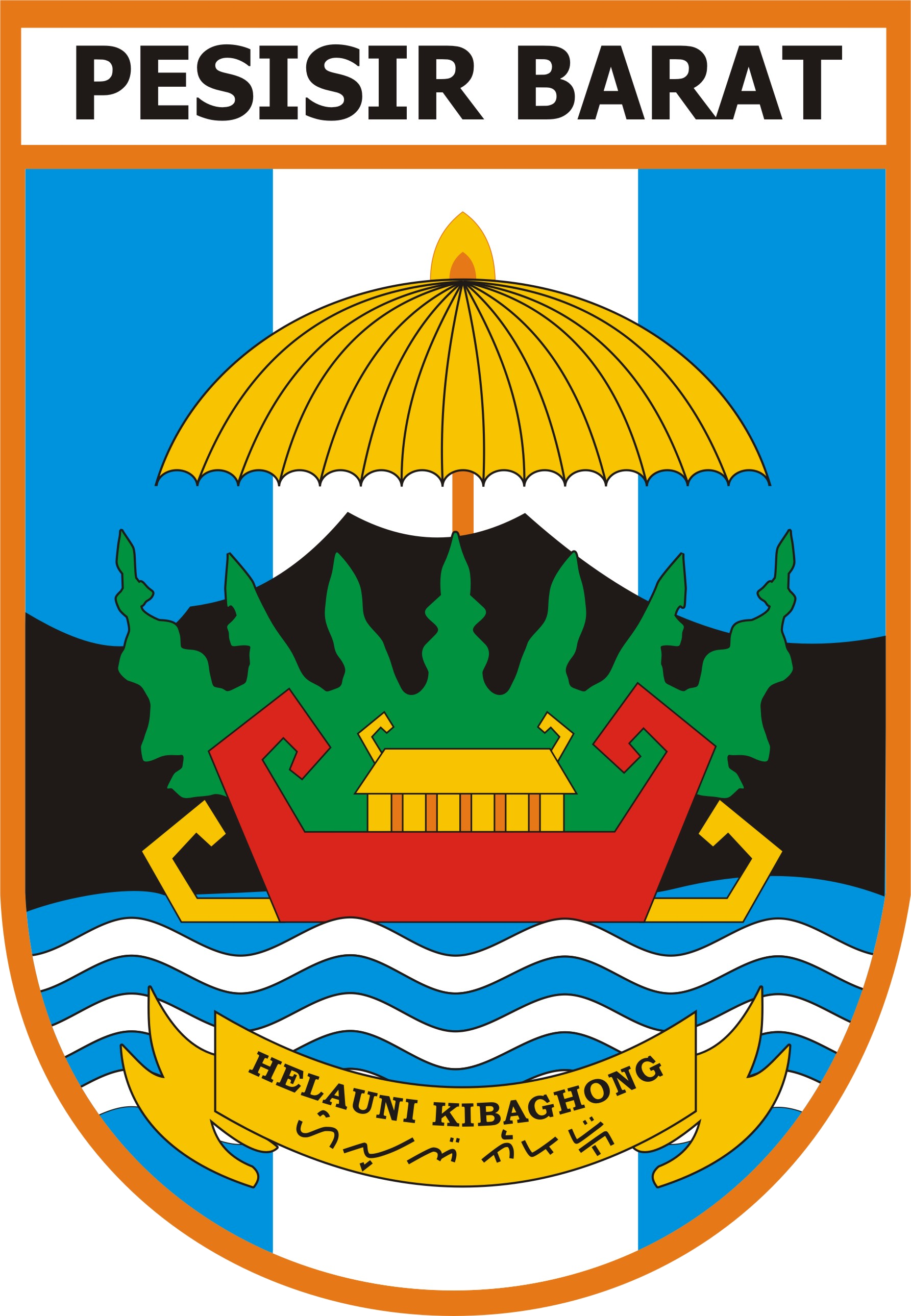
- Coat of arms
- Motto: Helauni Kibaghong (Better together)
- Location within Lampung

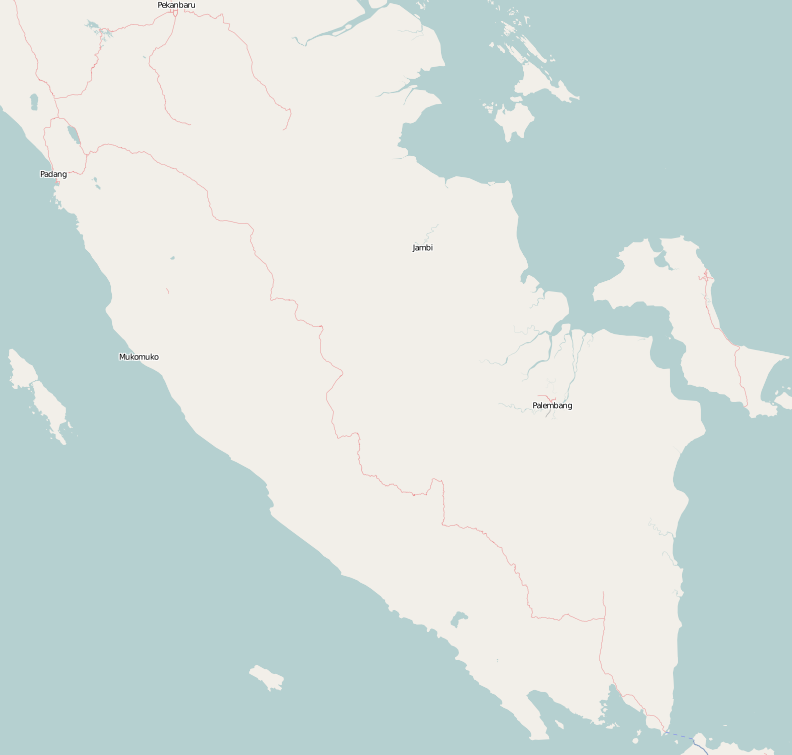
- Location in Southern Sumatra, Sumatra and Indonesia Pesisir Barat Regency (Sumatra) Pesisir Barat Regency (Indonesia)
- Coordinates: 5.1932°S 103.9398°E
- Country: Indonesia
- Region: Sumatra
- Province: Lampung
- Regency seat: Krui

Government
  - Regent: Dedi Irawan
  - Vice Regent: Irawan Topani

Area
  - Total: 2,939.60 km^{2} (1,134.99 sq mi)

Population (mid 2025 estimate)
  - Total: 178,549
  - Density: 60.7392/km^{2} (157.314/sq mi)
- Time zone: UTC+7 (IWST)
- Area code: (+62) 728
- Website: pesisirbaratkab.go.id

Pesisir Barat Regency (Indonesian: Kabupaten Pesisir Barat, also known as West Coast Regency) is a regency in Lampung Province of Indonesia. It was established on 25 October 2012 from eight western districts of West Lampung Regency. It covers an area of 2,939.60 km^{2} and had a population of 141,741 at the 2010 Census and 162,697 at the 2020 Census; the official estimate as of mid 2025 was 178,549 (comprising 91,926 males and 85,504 females in 2024). The administrative center is the town of Krui. The lampung peopleare the majority ethnic group in the Pesisir Barat Regency is the Lampung people, while the Bengkulu language is also spoken in some of the northern districts.

== Administrative districts ==
In 2012, the new regency comprised eight districts (kecamatan), which had previously been part of west Lampung Regency. However, since 2012, three additional districts have been created in the northern half of the new regency from parts of the existing districts - Krui Selatan (South Krui), Pulau Pisang (Pisang Island), and Way Krui. The districts are listed below from northwest to southeast of these districts, along with their areas and populations according to the 2010 Census and the 2020 Census, as well as official population estimates for mid-2025. The table also indicates the locations of the district administrative centers, the number of villages in each district (a total of 116 rural desa and two urban kelurahan - both of the latter in Pesisir Tengah District), and their postcodes.

Kode Wilayah	Name of District (kecamatan)	Area in km^{2}	Pop'n 2010 Census	Pop'n 2020 Census	Pop'n mid 2025 estimate	Admin centre	No. of villages	Post code
18.13.03	Lemong	467.13	14,089	12,874	13,580	Rata Agung	13	34877
18.13.04	Pesisir Utara (North Coast)	79.89	9,332	8,463	9,010	Pugung Tampak	12	34876
18.13.06	Pulau Pisang (Pisang Island)	1.48	^{(a)}	1,554	1,726	Pekon Pasat	6	34896
18.13.05	Karya Penggawa	251.14	13,986	15,651	16,300	Way Nukak	12	34878
18.13.07	Way Krui	38.59	^{(b)}	8,775	9,325	Gunung Kemala	10	34898
18.13.01	Pesisir Tengah (Central Coast)	121.42	34,437	19,787	21,543	Pasar Krui	8 ^{(c)}	34894
18.13.08	Krui Selatan (South Krui)	26.59	^{(b)}	10,583	11,846	Way Napal	10	34874
18.13.02	Pesisir Selatan (South Coast)	440.38	21,346	26,504	29,592	Biha	15	34875
18.13.09	Ngambur	327.69	17,580	21,809	24,509	Negeri Ratu Ngambur	9	34883
18.13.10	Ngaras	229.82	7,443	9,550	10,943	Ngaras	9	34888
18.13.11	Bengkunat	955.48	23,528	27,147	30,175	Kota Jawa	14	34887
	Totals	2,939.60	141,741	162,697	178,549	Pasar Krui	118	

Notes: (a) The 2010 population of the new Pulau Pisang District is included in the figure for Pesisir Utara District. The new Pulau Pisang District comprises the offshore island of the same name, adjacent to the coast of Karya Penggawa District.
(b) The 2010 populations of the new Way Krui District and Krui Selatan District are included in the figure for Pesisir Tengah District. (c) Including the two kelurahan of Pasar Kota Krui and Pasar Krui.

=== History ===
Umpu Ratu Selalau Sanghyang Sangun Gukhu, born on the 21st of Ramadhan 828 Hijri (equivalent to the 9th of April 1425 AD) and died in 962 Hijri, was a prominent figure as a Mujahid Spreader of Islam and the Sultan of Kepaksian Pernong Sekala Brak, residing in the Istana Gedung Dalom Batu Brak.

Queen Umpu Selalau Shangyang Sangun Gukhu was laid to rest in the Tambak Bata cemetery. An evidence of her legacy in Krui Pesisir Barat Regency is the footprint engraved on a stone called Maqom Selalauhehis stone marks the location where sis said to have honforontedned asefetedhed the ruler of Bunian Matu. Maqom Selalau has since served as a significant landmark in the regioThe area n, stretching from the sugarcane fields along the Limau River Kingdom to the Kepaksian Nyerupa area. It extends from Maqom to Suwoh, Tanggamus Regency, Lampung Selatan Regency, and Batu Brak, which encompasses the area of Kepaksian Pernong Sekala Brak.

Pesisir Barat Regency was formally established in 2012 under the Republic of Indonesia Law Number 22 of 2012 concerning the Establishment of the West Coastal Regency in Lampung Province (State Gazette of the Republic of Indonesia 2012 Number 231, Supplement to State Gazette Number 5364).

Prior to the establishment of the West Coastal Regency as stipulated in the aforementioned law, it was part of the West Lampung Regency administered from Liwa.

== Airport ==
In early October 2011, the runway test was conducted, and the testers concluded that the airport was ready for operation. Spanning 50 hectares of land, the airport features a 974-meter-long runway, an apron, taxiway, an administration building, and a 1,800-meter road leading to the airport. Situated in Seray village, Pesisir Tengah district, it aims to bolster tourism and serve as a precautionary measure in cases of natural disasters.

== Dolphin conservation ==
According to traditional wisdom, which prohibits people from catching dolphins, hundreds of these marine mammals encircle Betuah Island and Banana Island, with their numbers showing a tendency to increase each year.

== Tanjung Setia Beach ==
Tanjung Setia Beach, situated facing the Indian Ocean, lies 273 kilometers from Bandar Lampung, requiring approximately 6 to 7 hours by car to reach. From June to August annually, the waves reach heights of 6 to 7 metres, extending over 200 metres, making it an ideal destination for surfers worldwide, earning comparisons to Hawaii. Just a few kilometres off the coast, Indo-Pacific blue marlins weighing up to 70 kilograms (170 centimetres in length) can be found.
