= Suoh =

Suoh may refer to:

- Suwoh, a volcano in Indonesia
- Suoh Tamaki, a fictional character in Japanese series Ouran High School Host Club
