= List of ports of call of the British East India Company =

The East Indiamen of the British East India Company (EIC) passed many places and stopped at many ports on their voyages from Britain to India and China in the 17th to 19th centuries, both on the way and as destinations. Some of these places were simply landmarks, but a number of the places were the locations of EIC factories, i.e., trading posts.

In many cases the spelling of the names of these locations has changed between then and now. One purpose of this list is to link, where possible, the names as given in ships' logs with the modern name. Names in italics represent cases where the modern and older name are different.

== A ==
- Acheh
- Alas, Strait of
- Amboina (Ambonya)
- Amoy
- Amsterdam Island
- Anger or Anjere, or Anjer
- Angra Pequeña
- Anjengo – site of Anchuthengu Fort & EIC factory (1684–1813)
- Annobon
- Antique, Panay
- Ascension Island

== B ==
- Babelmandel Island
- Balambangan
- Balasore; Balasore Roads is about 125 miles south of Calcutta; it provided a sheltered anchorage for vessels awaiting a pilot or favourable winds to take them upriver, or to transfer cargo
- Bally is the island of Bali
- Bally Town is on the Hooghli River, slightly north of Calcutta
- Banaca
- Banda
- Bancoot (17°59′N 73°30′E) – about 75 miles SE of Bombay, on the Savitri River.
- Bandar Abbas
- Banjarmasin (See also Tamborneo)
- Bankshall – general term for the office of harbor-master or other port authority; at Calcutta the office stood on the banks of the Hooghli
- Bantal 2°45′49.1″S 101°20′01.7″E – west coast of Sumatra in the Moco Moco district (see below); 20 miles SE of Moco Moco and 17 miles NW of Ipuh (see below)
- Bantam; see also Banten Sultanate
- Barrabulla or Barra Bulla is a sandbank that forms near Kedgeree (see below) in the Hooghli River.
- Basara
- Bass Strait
- Bassein a city in Maharashtra state, India; known as Bassein to the Portuguese and British
- Batavia
- Bencoomat 5°30′S 104°12′E
- Benkulen or Bencoolen; see also Fort Marlborough
- Benguela
- Bimilipatnam (or Bhimili)
- Billiton is an island that also gave its name to a strait. See also Caramata. Billiton and Caramata islands flank a passage that connects the South China Sea to the Java Sea
- Bona Vista
- Bocca Tigris, or Bogue
- Bombay
- Bouru
- Burah Bazaar
- Busher (Bushire)

== C ==
- Cagayan Sulu
- Calcutta
- Calicut
- Calingapatam
- Cannanore
- Cape of Good Hope; equally Cape Colony
- Cape Comorin
- Cape San Diego, the easternmost point of the Mitre Peninsula, on Tierra del Fuego
- Caramata 1°37′S 108°53′E)
- Caramata Passage; see also Billiton.
- Carnicobar, or Car Nicobar
- Chumpee (or Chuenpee, or Chuenpi) in the Bocca Tigris, the estuary of the Pearl River
- Chusan
- Cochin
- Cochin China
- Colvin's Ghat – a landing place (Ghat) at the offices of Colvin & Company, shippers, which were situated on the waterfront on the Hugli in Calcutta
- Comoroone – alternate name for Bandar Abbas
- Condore
- Coninga or Cocanada; sometimes referred to as Jaggernaickpuram
- Coupang or Copang Bay, on the island of Timor
- Coringa
- Cortivy
- Covelong (Kovalam)
- Cox's Island: a small island merged into the north end of Saugor Island at the mouth of the Hooghly
- Crooe (Optical character recognition may render this as "Croce") – Krui 5.174154°S 103.931930°E, about seven miles SE of Pisang Island
- Cuddalore
- Culpee (Coulpy, Kulpi, Kalpi, or Kulpee): an anchorage towards Calcutta, and just below Diamond Harbour. Opposite Diamond Point.

== D-H ==
- Daman
- Delagoa Bay
- Diamond Harbour is about 41 miles south of Calcutta on the east side of the Hooghli.
- Diamond Point
- Diu
- Dryon, Straits of (by Pulau Durian in the Riau Archipelago)
- Eastern Channel (of the Hugli River)
- False Bay
- Fernando de Noronha
- Fort St. David
- Fort St. George, India, also Madras
- Frederiksnagore (Surampore)
- Fulta (or Fultah) – one of several related locations (Fultah village, Fultah point, etc.) on the Hooghli River. It is not the present day Fulta, which is much farther south. It may be the present day Falta.
- Galle
- Ganjam
- Garden Reach
- Goa
- Gombroon – alternate name for Bandar Abbas
- Gorée
- Great Nanka (2°25′S 105°48′E): one of the three Nanka Islands, which lie in Banka Strait, just off Banka Island (Palau Banka), which is part of the Banka Belitung Islands group.
- Gressee, Grissee, or Griessie is Grisik, the capital city of Gresik Regency, and about three leagues NNW from Surabaya
- Hog River Creek is a point on the Hooghli between Kidderpore and Kedgeree
- Hong Kong Bay
- Hugli or Hooghli River

== I-J ==
- Ile de Rhé
- Indremayo, or Indramayo
- Ingeli (or Hijili, Engelee, Ingelee, or Hidgelee): a point on the west side of the Hooghli Estuary
- Ipoh = Ipuh 2.999301°S 101.484517°E; west coast of Sumatra, not the city in Malaysia
- Jagarall Creek, near Calcutta
- Jambi – EIC factory 1613–1681
- Jaggernaickpuram (or Jaggernaikpoeram, or Jagannathapuram). Also known as Cocinga or Cocanada
- Jari – possibly Jarajah on the west coast of Sumatra near Bantal.
- Johanna

== K-M ==
- Kamree Roads (Kamree may represent a mis-transcription of Ramree)
- Karakaul
- Karrack (or Karrach)
- Karwar
- Kedah
- Kedgeree (or Kijari, or Cutgerie, or Cajoree), a point on the Hoogly halfway between Calcutta and Saugor (see below), and a place where the river widens into a basin
- Kidderpore
- Kinsale
- Kissim Bay or Kishm, or Kisseem
- Lintin Island
- Linton – probably Lintin (22°25′N 113°37′E)
- Lombok
- Madapollam 16°27′N 81°44′E, (or Madhavayapalem)
- Madras
- Madura Island
- Madeira
- Mahé
- Mahim
- Maio, Cape Verde
- Malacca
- Malwa – probably a mis-transcription for Malvan
- Managalore
- Manila
- Manna Point or Town, southeast of Bengkulu, on the west coast of Sumatra; now Mana (4.484947°S 102.899207°E)
- Masulipatam
- Matavai, Tahiti
- Mew Bay – about two miles east of Tanjung Layar
- Mew Island – aka Cantae, is an island in Mew Bay
- Mokha
- Moco Moco
- Muscat

== N-R ==
- Narsipore
- Nagore
- Negapatam
- New Anchorage, Calcutta, near Diamond Harbour and Kedgeree
- Nicobar Islands, or Nicobars.
- Norfolk Island
- North Island – the northernmost of three islands in the bay that formed the principle anchorage of Enggano Island
- Onore
- Onreat – probably Onrust Island
- Padang
- Pattani
- Pedro Branco 1°19′49″N 104°24′21″E, is an island of white rock at the east end of the Singapore Strait. It is now the site of Horsburgh Lighthouse
- Penang
- Perates – site where the East Indiaman Earl Talbot wrecked on 22 October 1800 with the loss of all passengers and crew.
- Pisang or Pulau Pisang, (5.120294°S 103.847637°E), an island off the south coast of Sumatra, between Benkulen and Bengkunat (Bencoomat)
- Pissang, or Pulo Pesang; in the 18th century, Pulau Pemanggil was known as Pissang.
- Point de Galle
- Pondicherry
- Poolo Bay, a bay some nine miles southward of Fort Marlborough, Bengkulu (city)
- Port Cornwallis, on Ross Island in the Andaman Islands
- Porto Novo
- Porto Praya
- Priaman
- Pring: a pepper port some 16 miles northwest of Manna Point, on the west coast of Sumatra
- Pulo Bay – a now silted-up natural harbor about eight miles southward of Benkulen (Benkulu).
- Qishm
- Quedah – Kedah
- Quilon
- Rajah Basah (or Raja Basa) Roads. Named for the volcano on the Sunda Strait, located at the most south-eastern point of Sumatra 05°47′00″S 105°37′30″E. The Roads are in Lampung Bay.
- Rangoon
- Rat Island: a small island west of Bengkulu
- Rendezvous Island (Pulo Bauwal/Bauwal Island); 2°45′S 110°5′E, Borneo
- Resolution Bay, Vanuatu; Captain James Cook named the bay after his vessel HMS Resolution
- Rio de Janeiro
- Rodrigues
- Rogues River: a section of the Hooghly River

== S ==
- St Augustine's Bay
- St Helena
- Sadras Roads
- Samarang
- Sambava
- Sambroke, or Samkoke, or Samkokm or Samoke is probably the island also known at the time as Pyramid Island. This seems to be Hòn Dung, Nha Trang, Vietnam 12°16′17″N 109°21′39.4″E.
- Saugor: is at the mouth of the Hooghli, about 100 miles downriver from Calcutta
- St Paul's Island
- Saldanha Bay
- Saloomah, or Saloomale; on the coast of Sumatra between Fort Marlborough and Manna Point. Now Pasarseluma, Seluma Selatan (4.139799°S 102.517656°E)
- St. Salvador, or San Salvadore, or Salvador
- Santa Cruz
- Santiago, Cape Verde, or São Tiago, or St Jago
- Sapi (or Sape, or Sapeh) Town 8°34′S 118°59′E
- Scindy road – probably the roadstead of Sindh, i.e., the waters off Karachi
- Second Bar – about 20 miles before Whampoa
- Severndroog (Suvarnadurg), not to be confused with the inland fort of Savandurga, sometimes also called Severndroog
- Sillebar or Silebar – on the Strait of Malacca on the north coast of Sumatra: 3°14′04″N 99°32′37″E
- Simon's Bay
- Sukadana
- Sulu
- Surabaya
- Surampore
- Surat
- Swally

== T-W ==
- Tamborneo or Tomborneo
- Tapanooli, Tappanooli, Tapanuli, or Tarapouly, Sumatra — possibly modern Tapnoeli or Tapian Nauli — site of an EIC factory
- Teneriffe
- Teinchin
- Tiku
- Timor
- Tellicherry
- Toonkoon, or Toon Kwoon, a district between Hong Kong and Canton
- Tranquebar
- Trengganu
- Trincomalee
- Trindade
- Tristan de Cunha
- Tumala Punta 14.903150°N 80.067857°W
- Tryamong; also an EIC factory site, possibly also known as Priaman.
- Urmston's Bay, formerly (pre-1823) Toon-Koo Harbour
- Vizagapatam
- Whampoa or Whampoa anchorage

== Unidentified locations ==
- "Broken Ground" – a place or region between Bengal and Madras; possibly a section of the Hoogli between Ingeli and Barrabula
- Capshee Bay
- Caipang Bay
- Cockelee
- Doens (probably a typographical error for The Downs.)
- Jangarall Creek, Calcutta
- Hollis Bay (possibly a miss-transcription of Wallis Bay)
- Lombon Strait (not Lombok Strait)
- Monsourcottah – probably near Ganjam
- Pulo Massey (or Pulo Masey) – possibly Sumbawa, in the Lesser Sunda Islands group.

== See also ==
List of Dutch East India Company trading posts and settlements

== Bibliography ==
- Erikson, Emily (2014) Between Monopoly and Free Trade: The English East India Company, 1600–1757: The English East India Company, 1600–1757. (Princeton University Press). ISBN 9780691159065
- Horsburgh, James. (1836) India Directory or Directions for Sailing to and from the East Indies, China, New Holland, Cape of Good Hope, and the interjacent Ports, compiled chiefly from original Journals and Observations made during 21 years' experience in navigating those Seas 4th Edn. W. H. Allen, London.
