= Suwoh =

Volcanic-tectonic depression in Sumatra, Indonesia

Suoh
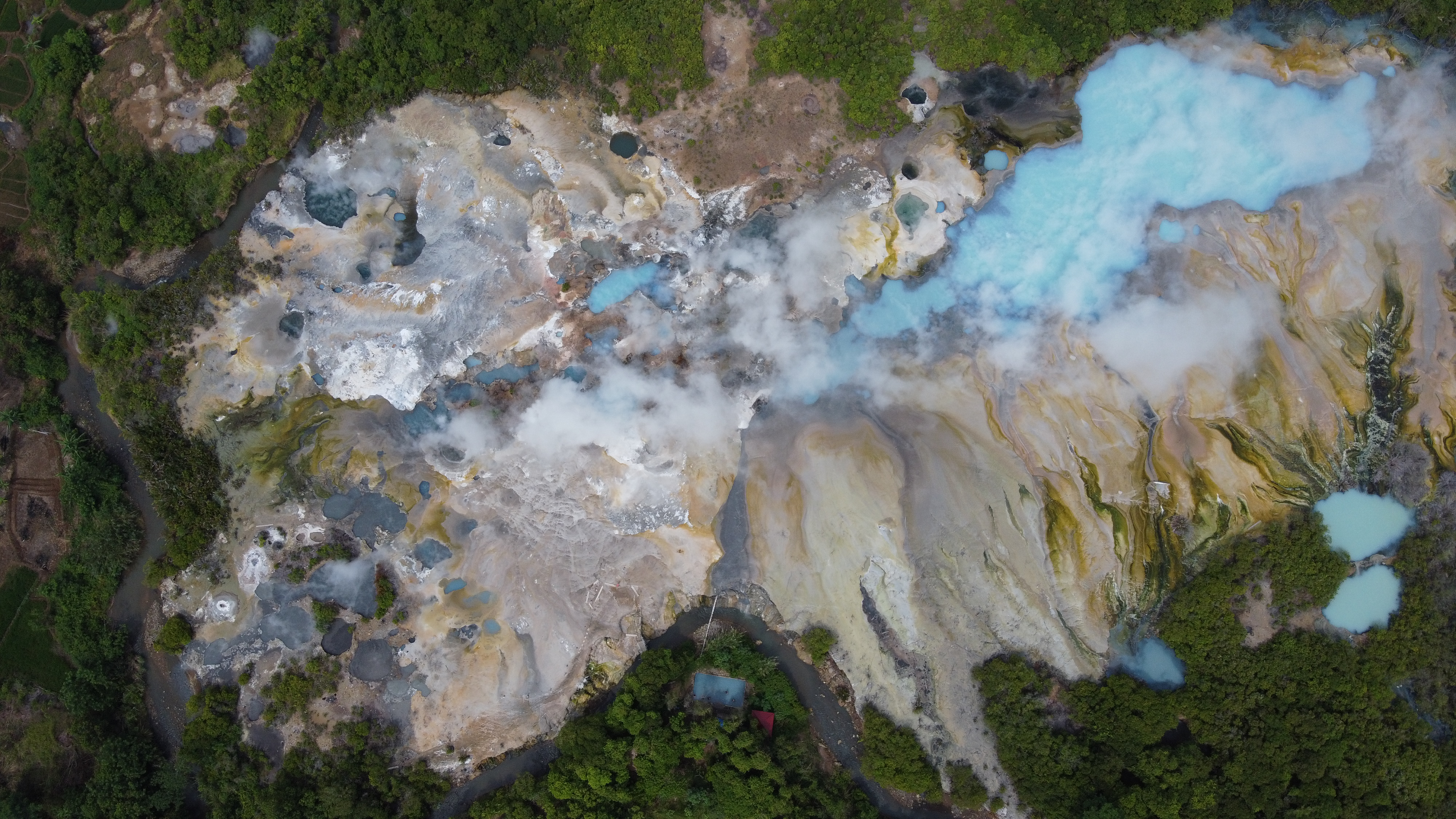
- Geothermic activity in the Suoh depression

Highest point
- Elevation: 1,000 m (3,300 ft)
- Coordinates: 5.25°S 104.27°E

Geography
- Location: Sumatra, Indonesia
- Parent range: Bukit Barisan

Geology
- Mountain type(s): calderas, maars, lava domes
- Volcanic arc: Sunda Arc
- Last eruption: 24 May 2024

Suoh or Suwoh is an 8 × 16 km wide volcano-tectonic depression in the southern part of Sumatra, Indonesia. Historical maars and silicic lava domes are found along the Great Sumatran fault line. Phreatic eruptions have been recorded after both the major 1933 and 1994 Liwa earthquake. It is located within the West Lampung Regency, Lampung Province. The volcano erupted again in a similar fashion on 24 May 2024.

== See also ==
- List of volcanoes in Indonesia
