= Bengkunat =

- Village
- Location of the town in Sumatra
- Coordinates: 5°37′0″S 104°21′0″E
- Country: Indonesia
- Province: Lampung
- Regency: West Lampung Regency

Population (mid 2024)
  - Total: 29,865
- Time zone: UTC+7 (WIB)

Bengkunat is a village and also an administrative district (kecamatan) within the West Coastal Regency (Kabupaten Pesisir Barat) of Lampung Province of Indonesia, situated in far south-western Sumatra. It is connected by road directly to the provincial capital of Bandar Lampung in the east. It lies near the coast and what is known as Bengkunat Bay, located about 7 miles southeast of Ujung Siging. A massif is formed in this area, the Bengkunat massif, noted for its granite.

== Administration ==
The district is composed of fifteen administrative villages (desa), listed below with their populations as at mid 2024.

- Way Haru (1,729)
- Siring Gading (926)
- Way Tias (867)
- Bandar Dalam (2,288)
- Sumber Rejo (1,808)
- Suka Negeri (1,648)
- Kota Jawa (3,397)
- Pagar Bukit Induk (1,105)
- Penyandingan (2,107)
- Pemerihan (2,488)
- Tanjung Kemala (813)
- Suka Marga (2,737)
- Tanjung Rejo (2,610)
- Pagar Bukit (5,342)
- Kuta Mulya (....)

The first four listed above form a southern group (Kawasan) at the southwest corner of the peninsula, which are geographically separated (by Pematang Sawa District of Tanggamus Regency) from the other villages of the district, situated to the north.
