= 1933 Sumatra earthquake =

Earthquake in Indonesia

- Location within Sumatra Location within Indonesia
- UTC time: 1933-06-24 21:54:49
- ISC event: 905657
- USGS-ANSS: ComCat
- Local date: June 25, 1933
- Local time: 04:54:49 WIB
- Magnitude: 7.5–7.7 M_{s}
- Depth: 20 km (12 mi)
- Epicenter: 5.18°S 104.83°E
- Fault: Great Sumatran fault
- Type: Strike-slip
- Areas affected: Indonesia
- Max. intensity: MMI IX (Violent)
- Aftershocks: Multiple
- Casualties: 788+ dead

The 1933 Sumatra earthquake or Liwa earthquake affected southern Sumatra, Indonesia, on 25 June at 04:54 WIB. The earthquake had an estimated surface-wave magnitude (M_{s}) of 7.5–7.7 and occurred at a shallow depth of 20 km (12 mi). It was caused by slip along a 130 km (81 mi) section of the seismically active Great Sumatran fault, a major fault on the island that partially accommodates oblique convergence between the Australian and Sunda plates. The Kumering segment, one of 20 segments that make up the fault zone, near the southern end of the fault, may have produced the ruputure. The earthquake caused damage and hundreds of deaths in Kaur and Liwa. At least 788 people were reported killed, although the death toll may have been in the thousands. Aftershocks followed, including one that caused additional deaths. The mainshock also triggered a nearby volcanic eruption at Suwoh two weeks later, killing an unknown number of people.

== Tectonic setting ==
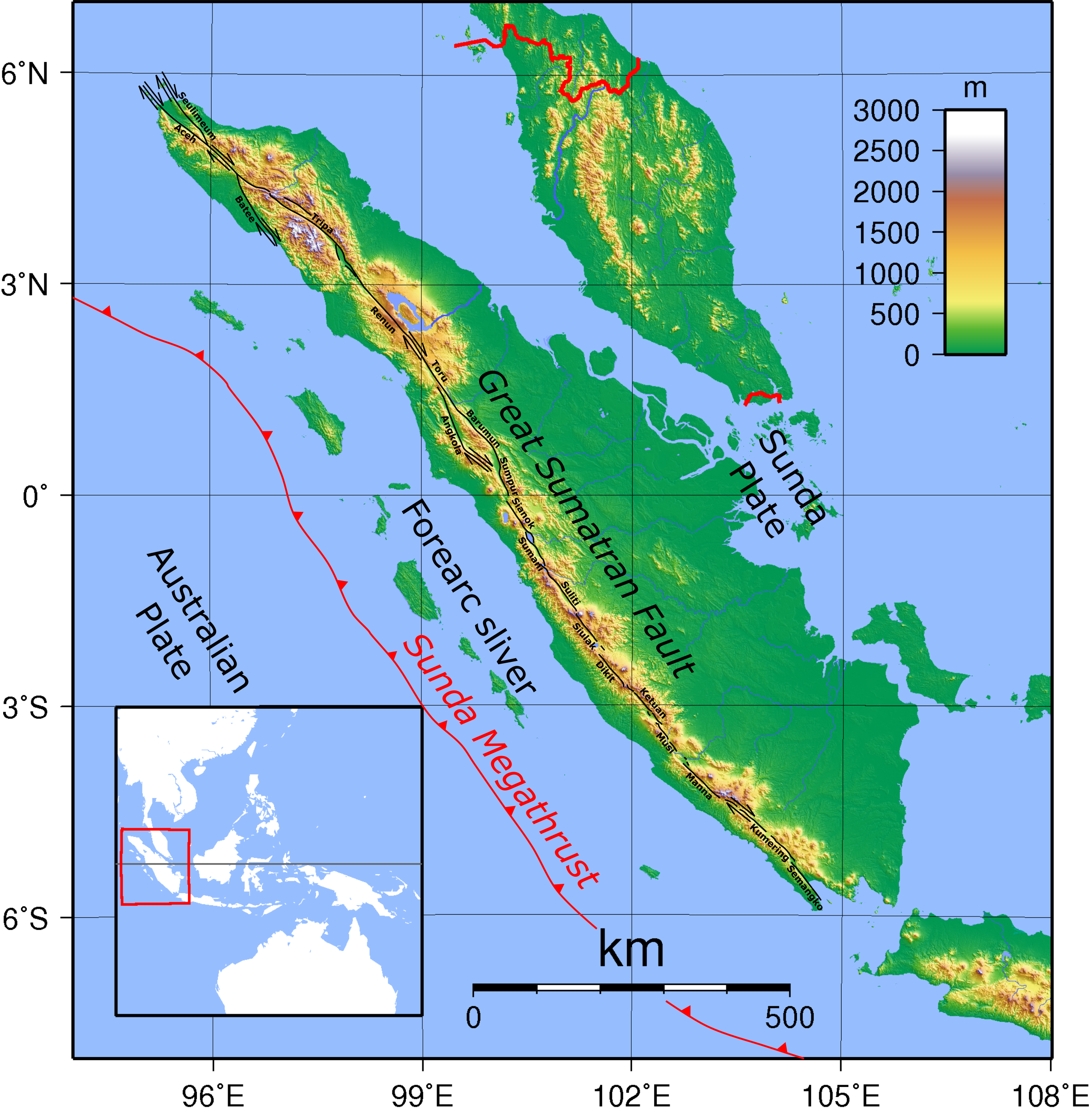
The Great Sumatran fault has distinct segments which are named

Off the west coast of Sumatra lies the Sunda megathrust, a 5,500 km (3,400 mi) long convergent boundary where the Australian plate subducts beneath the Burma plate and Sunda plate at a rate of 60 mm (2.4 in) per year. Convergence along this plate boundary is highly oblique, causing crustal deformation within the overriding Sunda plate.

Part of this deformation is accommodated by strike-slip motion along the Great Sumatran fault; a 1,900 km (1,200 mi) long strike-slip fault system located on the island of Sumatra. The fault is divided into 20 geometrically distinct segments that extends for 35 to 200 km (22 to 124 mi). Each segment is bounded at both ends by bends which causes the fault's segmentation. The slip rate along these segments vary; the northern Sumatra segments moves at 16–20 mm (0.63–0.79 in) per year; the central segments slip at 23 mm (0.91 in) per year, and in the south, is at 6 mm (0.24 in) per year. The Great Sumatran fault was the source of the 1994 Liwa and 1995 Kerinci earthquakes. It produced its largest earthquake during the 1943 Alahan Panjang sequence; measuring M_{w} 7.7.

== Earthquake ==
The earthquake occurred on 25 June at 04:54 WIB with a surface-wave magnitude of 7.5 or 7.7. It was caused by a strike-slip rupture on at least one segment of the Great Sumatran fault. It had an epicenter 50 km (31 mi) southeast of the Semangko segment and 60 km (37 mi) north of the Kumering segment.

The distribution of damage suggest most of the 150 km (93 mi) long Kumering segment ruptured during the earthquake. An analysis of the aftershocks suggest the rupture extended for at least 130 km (81 mi) on the southern portion of the segment. From hypocenter at the southeastern end of the Kumering segment, the earthquake rupture began propagating northwestward on the fault. Another possible scenario involves a rupture beginning on the Semangko segment, the segment immediately south of the Kumering segment. This scenario assumes the northeastern Semangko and southwestern Kumering segments ruptured during the earthquake. Five aftershocks were recorded, two of which were located 100 km (62 mi) and 130 km (81 mi) northwest of the epicenter, respectively.

Between 1933 and 1994, no earthquakes of magnitude 6.0 or larger were recorded on the aforementioned portions of the Great Sumatran fault. H. P. Berlage reported ground fissures in Negeri Ratu (Note: A village in West Lampung Recency; 5.029°S 104.137°E) and near the Wai Uluhan river, (Note: Located at 4.937°S 104.025°E) located 16 km (9.9 mi) apart. However, Berlage did not specify that the fissures at these locations formed a continuous feature or provide any details of offset in the ground. At Negeri Ratu, he documented a 1 m (3 ft 3 in) wide rupture appearing in the flat plain. These observations were made along the Kumering segment and may represent surface rupture caused by the earthquake.

== Damage ==
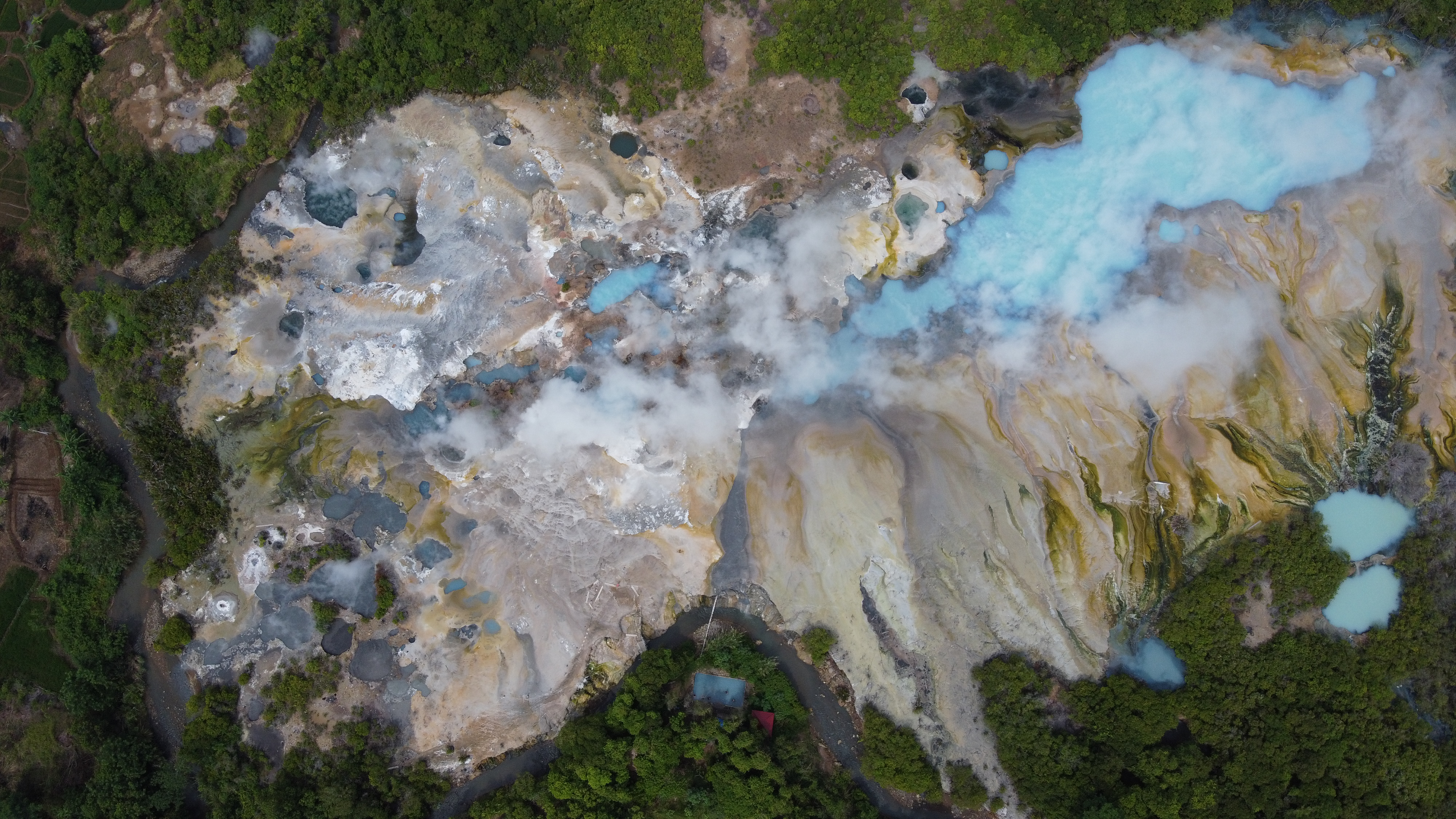
Suwoh which erupted two weeks later

Destruction was widespread along an area between Lake Ranau and Suwoh, coinciding with the approximate length of the Kumering segment rupture. The earthquake had a maximum Modified Mercalli intensity of VIII–IX (Severe–Violent). Many buildings and other infrastructure in the western portion of southern Sumatra were damaged. Damage in Sebarus, a village in Lampung, was so severe that it forced all of its residents to leave. In Pasirah, every home was destroyed and rice fields were ruined, while in Liwa and Banding Agung, all of its buildings were razed. On the Barisan Mountains, many landslides were reported. Large fissures and ground subsidence were reported from Kota Agung to Makaka. On Lake Ranau, at the entrance of the Wai Warduk river in Kotabatu, a "co-seismic flood wave" inundated ten paddy fields by up to 0.5 m (1 ft 8 in).

At least 424 deaths were reported in Kaur, South Bengkulu, while another 364 people died in Liwa. At least 50 people were badly injured in addition to 600 others with minor injuries. The total number of fatalities is unknown and may be in the thousands, although the National Geophysical Data Center earthquake database only attributed 76 deaths within the event. An early statement by Reuters said at least 20 Europeans were among the 60 people dead which turned out false. In the aftermath, the government ensured adequate food, medication and hygiene for the affected communities.

An aftershock on June 26 also caused several fatalities in Bengkulu. Two weeks after the mainshock, geothermal activity at Suwoh increased, and a series of phreatic eruptions occurred, causing ash to fall on settlements. The eruption was rated VEI-4 on the volcanic explosivity index and caused an unspecified number of deaths. It ejected 0.2 km^{3} (0.048 cu mi) of tephra which blanketed the region.

== See also ==
- List of earthquakes in 1933
- List of earthquakes in Indonesia
