= March 2007 Sumatra earthquakes =

Earthquakes in Indonesia

- Location within Sumatra Location within Indonesia
- UTC time: Doublet earthquake: 2007-03-06 03:49:38; 2007-03-06 05:49:25
- ISC event: 11691339; 11691369
- USGS-ANSS: ComCat; ComCat
- Local date: March 6, 2007
- Local time: 10:49 a.m. WIB; 12:49 p.m. WIB
- Magnitude: 6.4 M_{wc}; 6.3 M_{wc}
- Epicenter: 0.49°N 100.5°E
- Fault: Great Sumatran fault
- Type: Strike-slip
- Areas affected: Indonesia
- Max. intensity: MMI VIII (Severe)
- Casualties: 68 fatalities; over 460 serious injuries

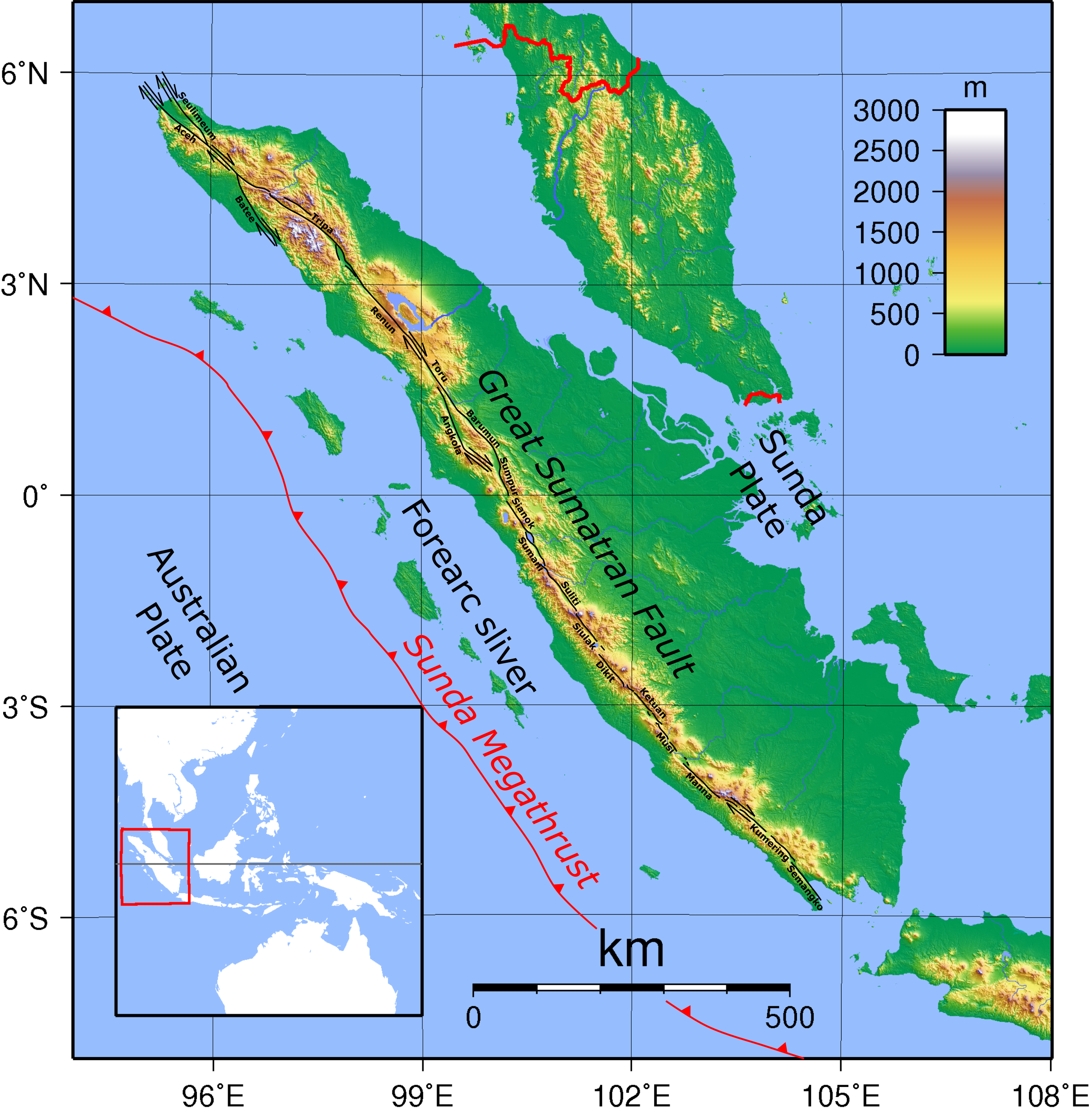
Map of the Great Sumatran fault with labelled segments

The March 2007 Sumatra earthquakes occurred near the northern end of Lake Singkarak in Sumatra, Indonesia, on March 6. The first shock in this earthquake doublet struck with a maximum Mercalli intensity of VIII (Severe) and the second shock that arrived two hours later had a maximum Mercalli intensity of VI (Strong).

== Earthquakes ==
The initial quake at 10:49 (03:49 UTC) measured 6.4 on the moment magnitude scale and the second quake at 12:49 (05:49 UTC) measured 6.3. The earthquakes were felt as far away as Singapore and Malaysia, which prompted the evacuation of some buildings there.

== Effects ==
Over 60 fatalities and 460 serious injuries have been reported, spread across many towns and regencies in West Sumatra. Over 43,000 houses were damaged, with over 12,000 of those severely damaged. The severe damage to other structures includes over 130 public facilities, 310 mosques, 60 government buildings, 370 schools, and 230 shops. According to the governor of West Sumatra, Agam Regency is the worst affected area, though other areas including Solok Regency and Tanah Datar are also badly affected. The total value of damage is estimated to be around 1.4 trillion Indonesian rupiah (US$160 million).

== Response ==
A variety of local and international aid organizations have deployed to the region to assist victims. A number of countries have pledged aid, including the Netherlands (US$2.0 million), Sweden (US$1.0 million), Canada (US$0.21 million), Malaysia (US$0.16 million), United States (US$0.1 million) and Taiwan (US$0.06 million). The US AID has supplied them with all sorts of essentials like blankets, water, food and first aid kits.

== See also ==
- List of earthquakes in 2007
- List of earthquakes in Indonesia
