= Great Sumatran fault =

Geological feature

- Semangko Fault
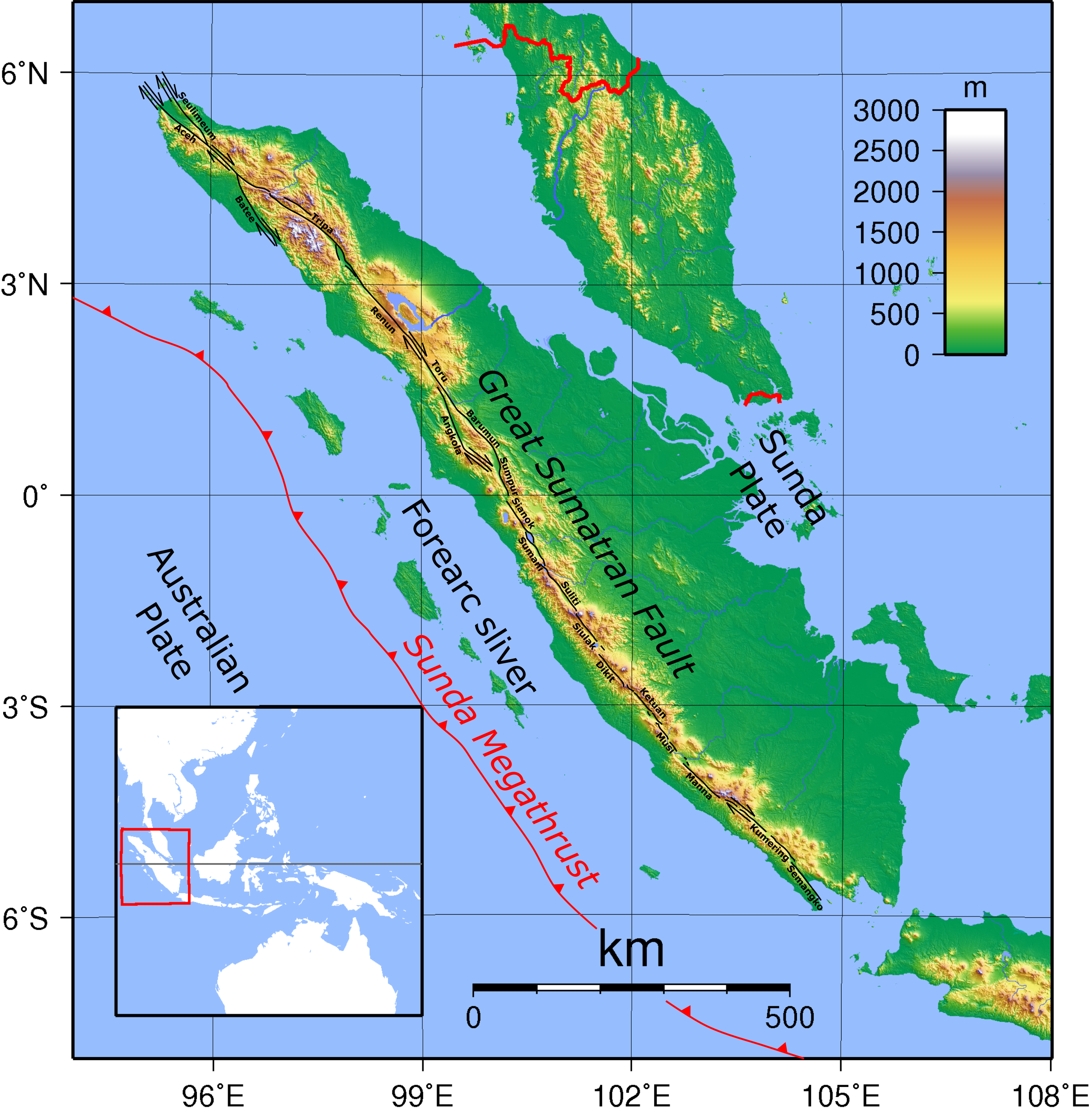
- Location: Sumatra
- Country: Indonesia

Characteristics
- Length: ~1650-1900km

Tectonics
- Plate: Australian plate, Eurasian plate
- Earthquakes: 24 June 1933, 19 Sept 1936, 1943 Alahan Panjang earthquake, 2 April 1964, 1994 Liwa earthquake, March 2007 Sumatra earthquakes, 2022 Sumatra earthquakes
- Type: strike-slip fault

The Great Sumatran fault, also known as Semangko fault, is a large strike-slip fault running the entire length of the island of Sumatra. This Indonesian island is located in a highly seismic area of the world, including a subduction zone off the west coast of the island.

The Great Sumatran fault zone accommodates most of the strike-slip motion associated with the oblique convergence between the Indo-Australian plate and Eurasian plate The fault ends in the north near the city of Banda Aceh, which was devastated in the 2004 Indian Ocean earthquake.

== Geologic significance ==
The Great Sumatran fault is part of the system where strain partitioning was first described in plate tectonics. The convergence between the Indo-Australian plate and the Sunda plate is not perpendicular to the plate boundary in this region. Instead, the two plates move at an oblique angle. Most of the convergent strain is accommodated by thrust motion at the plate boundary "megathrust" fault that defines the Sunda Trench. But the oblique motion (the part of the plate motion parallel to the plate boundary) is accommodated by the Great Sumatran fault, which runs along the volcanic Sunda Arc.

The area between the main plate boundary thrust fault and the Great Sumatran fault forms a "sliver plate" that includes the entire offshore forearc, forearc islands, and the portion of Sumatra west of the Great Sumatran fault. This sliver plate is not a single rigid bloc, and the details of its internal deformation are under active investigation.

== Earthquakes ==
Listed from northwest to southeast:

- April 2, 1964: M_{w} 7.0 event near the northern tip of Sumatra and the city Banda Aceh.
- September 19, 1936: M_{w} 7.2 event (3.685°N 97.535°E)
- March 2007 Sumatra earthquakes: Doublet earthquakes of moment magnitude 6.4 and 6.3 two hours apart northeast of Lake Singkarak.
- 2022 Sumatra earthquake: A magnitude 6.2 earthquake damaged dozens of homes, offices and a school. Six killed and 32 injured. Felt in Malaysia and Singapore.
- 1926 Padang Panjang earthquakes: Doublet earthquake measuring 6.7 and 6.4. At least 411 people killed.
- 1943 Alahan Panjang earthquakes: Doublet earthquakes of moment magnitude 7.2 and 7.5 occurred within 7 hours of each other on June 8 and 9 southeast of Lake Singkarak.
- 1995 Kerinci earthquake: Moment magnitude 6.8 earthquake, killed at least 84 people and caused 1,868 injuries.
- 1994 Liwa earthquake: 7.0 M_{w} event caused 207 deaths near the southern tip of Sumatra.
- 1933 Sumatra earthquake: M_{w} 7.6 event (5.226°S 104.596°E) southern of Sumatra. More than 76 people killed and extensive damage. Two towns destroyed.

== See also ==
- Ring of Fire
