= Liwa, Indonesia =

Coordinates: 5°02′S 104°05′E

Liwa is a town which serves as the capital of West Lampung Regency, Lampung province, Indonesia.

Pesanggerahan established Sultan Kepaksian Paksi Pak Sekala Brak Palace Gedung Dalom in the 14th century AD. This is located at the foot of Mount Pesagi (the highest mountain in Lampung) which is the forerunner of the Lampung people today.

== See also ==
- 1994 Liwa earthquake
- 1933 Sumatra earthquake
