= 1995 Kerinci earthquake =

Earthquake in Indonesia

- 1995 Kerinci earthquake (Sumatra)
- UTC time: 1995-10-06 18:09:45
- ISC event: 74638
- USGS-ANSS: ComCat
- Local date: October 7, 1995
- Local time: 1:09 WIB
- Magnitude: 6.7 M_{w} 6.9–7.0 M_{s}
- Depth: 29.8 km
- Epicenter: 1.895°N 101.499°E
- Fault: Great Sumatran fault
- Type: Strike-slip
- Areas affected: Sumatra, Indonesia
- Max. intensity: MMI VIII (Severe)
- Landslides: Yes
- Aftershocks: Yes; Largest: mb 5.3
- Casualties: 84–100 dead, 2,073 injured

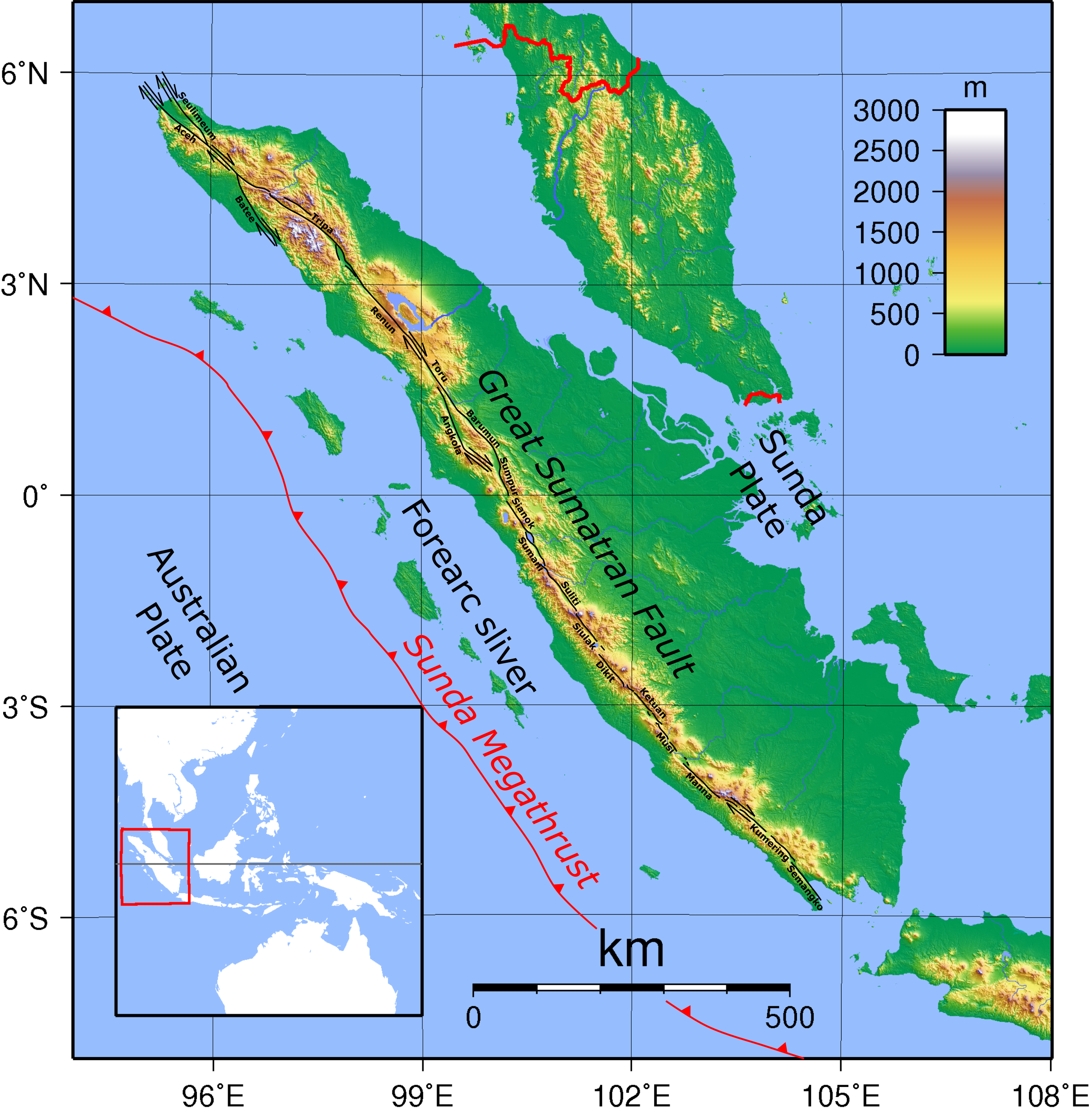
Map of the Great Sumatran fault with labelled segments

The 1995 Kerinci earthquake struck near Sungai Penuh in Jambi Province on the island of Sumatra, Indonesia. It earthquake occurred at 01:18 WIB (UTC +7) local time on October 7. The earthquake measured 6.7 M_{w} on the moment magnitude scale, and 6.9–7.0 M_{s} on the surface-wave magnitude scale. Between 84 and possibly even 100 people were killed in the earthquake. An extimated 4,000 buildings collapsed or were seriously damaged while a further 5,000 suffered some damage.

== Earthquake ==
The earthquake was associated with shallow strike-slip faulting along the Great Sumatran fault, instead of thrust mechanism associated with the Sunda Megathrust to the west coast. It ruptured the Siulak segment of the fault which was also involved in a magnitude 7.3 earthquake in 1909. This segment of the fault had been quiet for an unusually long period prior to the 1995 earthquake.

== Impact ==
The damage occurred mainly in the valley linear to the Great Sumatran fault. Serious damage was reported north of Lake Kerinci. The earthquake triggered large landslides around the valley, burying many residents. The Associated Press reported that at least 100 people had been killed as a result of the earthquake. An additional 773 people sustained serious injuries while 1,300 others were minor. There were earlier reports that suggested in the village of Kematan in Jambi Province lost 15 residents.

A total of more than 17,600 buildings were affected, 4,000 of them were destroyed or seriously damaged, leaving 65,000 people homeless. Rescue and recovery efforts were disrupted by the inaccessibility of the area, as well as damaged roads and wet weather conditions.

The earthquake was also reportedly felt in Singapore, where it caused some panic and drove many residents out of their homes. Despite the 470 km distance from the epicenter, the quake rattled lamps and furnitures in tall apartment buildings.

== See also ==
- List of earthquakes in 1995
- List of earthquakes in Indonesia
