= 1994 Liwa earthquake =

Earthquake in Indonesia

- Location within Sumatra
- UTC time: 1994-02-15 17:07:43
- ISC event: 185661
- USGS-ANSS: ComCat
- Local date: 16 February 1994
- Local time: 00:07 WIB (Indonesia Western Standard Time)
- Magnitude: 7.0 M_{w}
- Depth: 23 km (14 mi)
- Epicenter: 4.967°S 104.302°E
- Fault: Great Sumatran fault
- Type: Strike-slip
- Areas affected: Indonesia
- Max. intensity: MMI X (Extreme)
- Casualties: 207 dead and 2000+ injured

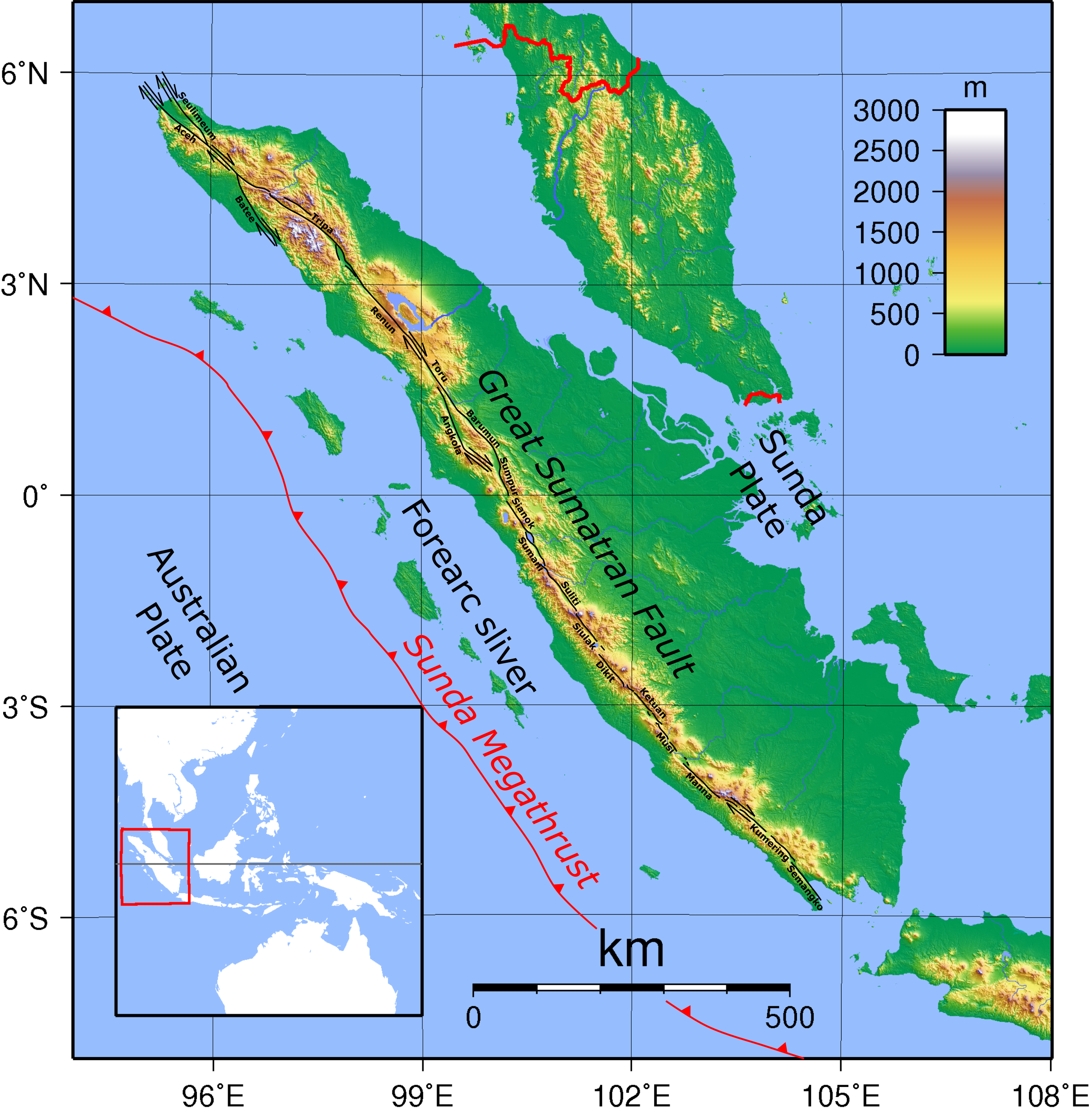
Map of the Great Sumatran Fault with labelled segments

The 1994 Liwa earthquake occurred on 16 February 1994 at 00:07 local time. It was located in southern Sumatra, Indonesia. The magnitude of the earthquake was put at M_{w} 6.9, M_{w}7.0, or M_{s} 7.2, according to different sources.

The earthquake caused 207 deaths and 2000 injuries. There was damage from landslides, mudslides, and fires in Lampung Province. Power outage occurred in western Lampung. Six-thousand buildings were damaged or destroyed by landslides in the Liwa area. In addition to southern Sumatra, the earthquake could be felt in western Java and Singapore. Intense smoke and gas activity was observed in the Suwoh volcanic area.

The earthquake took place at the Sumatran Fault Zone. The Sumatran Fault Zone is 1,900 km long and highly segmented. It can be divided into about 20 segments. The earthquake occurred in a subparallel strand 2.5 km southwest of the principal trace of the Kumering segment. The focal mechanism is of right-lateral strike-slip faulting.

== Reactions ==
Malaysian Prime Minister Mahathir Mohamad extended his condolences and sympathy to Indonesian President Suharto and the people of Indonesia over the earthquake.

== See also ==
- 1933 Sumatra earthquake
- List of earthquakes in 1994
- List of earthquakes in Indonesia
