= West Lampung Regency =

Regency in Lampung, Indonesia

West Lampung Regency Kabupaten Lampung Barat
- Regency
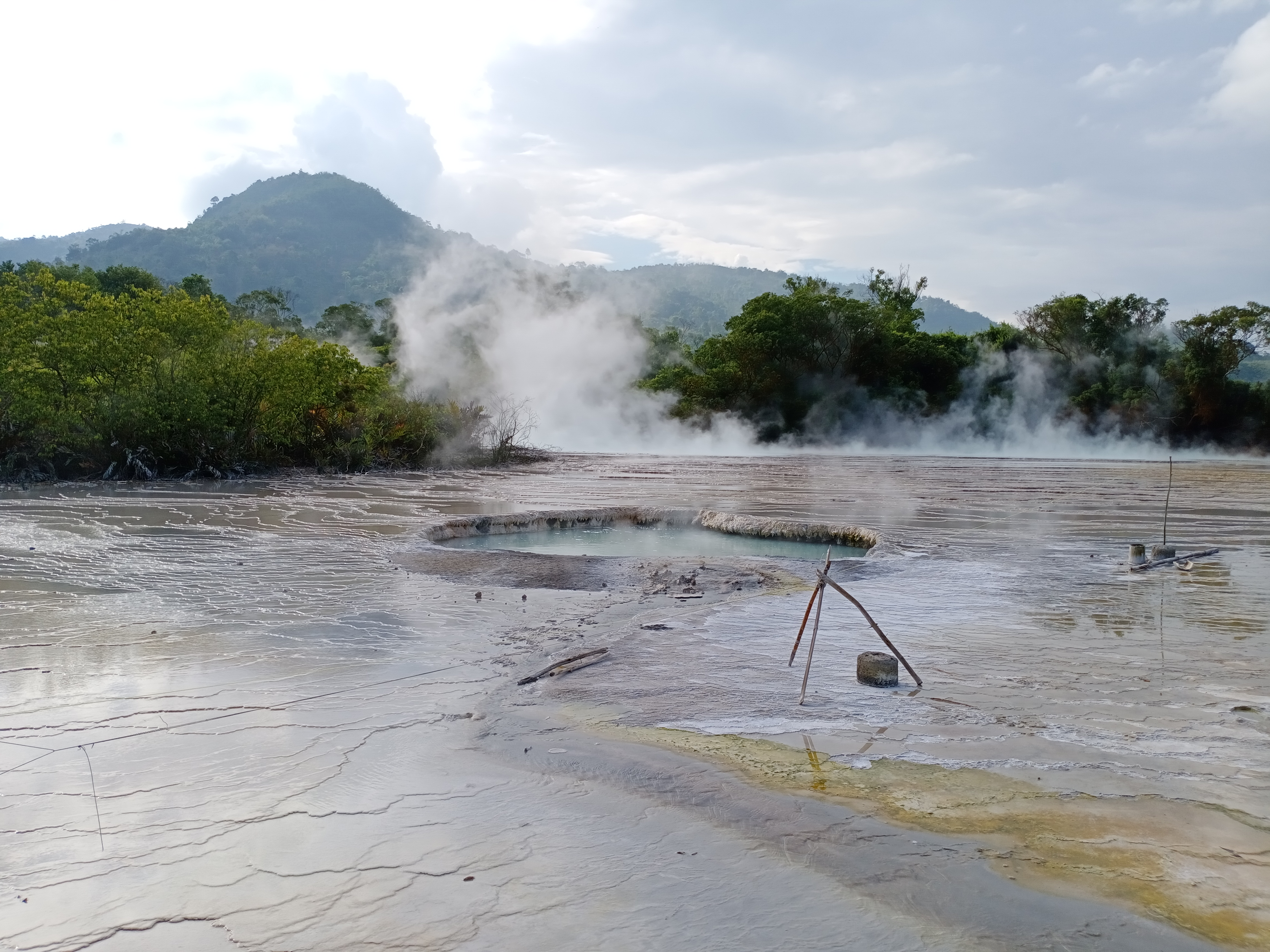
- Keramikan Suoh crater

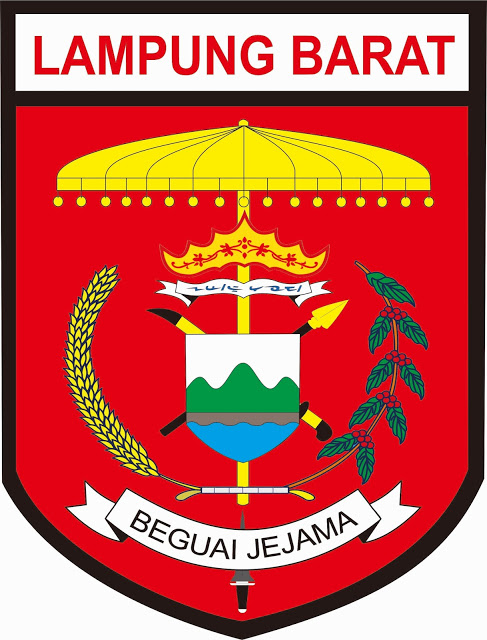
- Coat of arms
- Motto: Beguai Jejama (On equality together)
- Location within Lampung

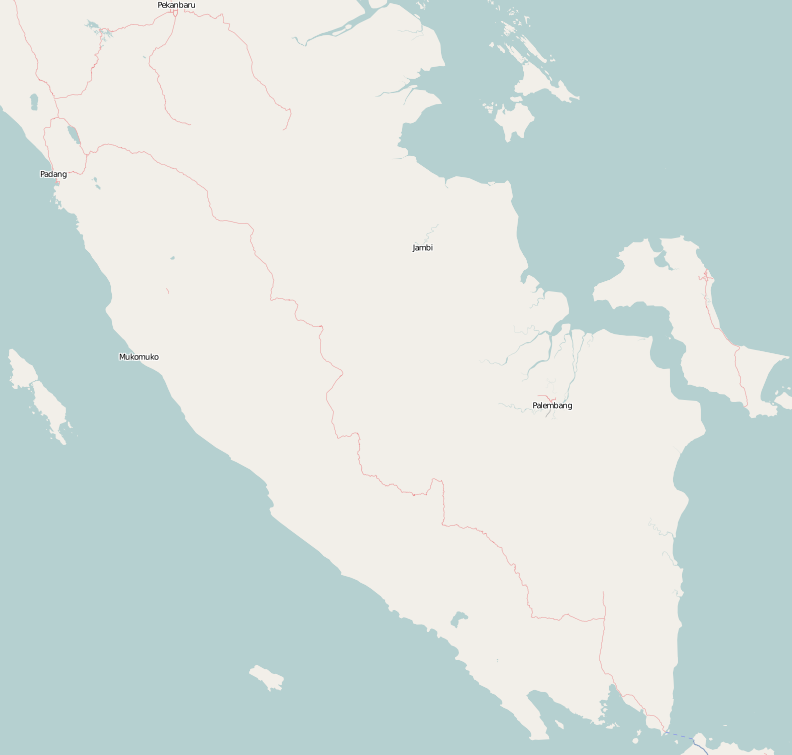
- Location in Southern Sumatra, Sumatra and Indonesia West Lampung Regency (Sumatra) West Lampung Regency (Indonesia)
- Coordinates: 5.1490°S 104.1931°E
- Country: Indonesia
- Province: Lampung
- Regency seat: Liwa

Government
  - Regent: Parosil Mabsus
  - Vice Regent: Mad Hasnurin

Area
  - Total: 2,107.99 km^{2} (813.90 sq mi)

Population (mid 2025 estimate)
  - Total: 315,193
  - Density: 149.523/km^{2} (387.263/sq mi)
- Time zone: UTC+7 (IWST)
- Area code: (+62) 721
- Website: lampungbaratkab.go.id

West Lampung Regency is a landlocked regency of Lampung Province, in the south of Sumatra, Indonesia. It was originally created on 16 August 1991 by splitting off the western districts of the existing North Lampung Regency; and until 2012 it had an area of 4,950.4 km^{2} of which forests occupied some 57% of the total area (as of 2011). It had a population of 418,560 people at the 2010 census. However, on 25 October 2012 the southwestern part of this area was separated from West Lampung Regency to form the new Pesisir Barat Regency (with its administrative centre at the town of Krui).

The residual Lampung Barat Regency now covers an area of 2,107.99 km^{2} and this area had a population of 277,296 at the 2010 census and 302,139 at the 2020 census; the official estimate as of mid 2025 was 315,193 (comprising 163,452 males and 151,741 females). The regency seat is at the town of Liwa.

== Administrative districts ==
West Lampung Regency consisted until 2012 of seventeen districts (kecamatan), but the southwestern eight districts were split off in 2012 to form the new Pesisir Barat (West Coast) Regency. Since that removal, six new districts have been created within the residual area of the regency, by splitting existing districts. The areas and populations of the resulting fifteen districts at the 2010 census and the 2020 census, together with the official estimates for mid 2025, are tabulated below. The districts are subdivided into 136 villages, each administered by a lurah. The table also includes the locations of the district administrative centres, the number of villages in each district (totaling 131 rural desa and 5 urban kelurahan), and its post codes.

Kode Wilayah	Name of District (kecamatan)	Area in km^{2}	Pop'n 2010 census	Pop'n 2020 census	Pop'n mid 2025 estimate	Admin centre	No. of villages	Post code
18.04.04	Balik Bukit	158.61	35,177	41,600	44,094	Liwa	12 ^{(a)}	34811: 34818
18.04.11	Sukau	145.95	26,800	24,760	26,380	Buay Nyerupa	10	34868
18.05.22	Lumbok Seminung	109.09	^{(b)}	8,030	9,074	Lumbok	11	34879
18.04.06	Belalau	93.96	25,848	12,490	12,712	Kenali	10	34873
18.04.08	Sekincau	115.16	36,734	18,870	19,488	Pampangan	5 ^{(c)}	34886
18.04.09	Suoh	116.12	42,590	18,450	18,966	Sumber Agung	7	34880
18.04.10	Batu Brak	242.91	12,690	14,990	15,608	Pekon Balak	11	34881
18.04.20	Pagar Dewa	197.84	^{(b)}	17,350	17,245	Basungan	10	34885
18.04.21	Batu Ketulis	182.13	^{(b)}	13,370	13,917	Bakhu	10	34872
18.04.23	Bandar Negeri Suoh	238.56	^{(b)}	24,630	26,222	Tri Mekar Jaya	10	34882
18.04.05	Sumber Jaya	131.08	41,216	24,040	24,445	Tugu Sari	6 ^{(d)}	34870
18.04.07	Way Tenong	129.78	42,117	34,790	35,456	Mutar Alam	9 ^{(e)}	34884
18.04.15	Gedung Surian	77.02	14,124	16,640	17,383	Gedung Surian	5	34871
18.04.18	Kebun Tebu	61.59	^{(b)}	20,500	21,627	Pura Jaya	10	34867
18.04.19	Air Hitam	108.20	^{(b)}	11,630	12,576	Sumber Alam	10	34866
	Totals	2,107.99	277,296	302,139	315,193	Liwa	136	

Note: (a) including 2 kelurahan - Pasar Liwa and Way Mengaku.
(b) new district created since 2012; its 2010 census population is included in the figure for the existing district(s) from which it was cut out.
(c) including the kelurahan of Sekincau. (d) including the kelurahan of Tugu Sari. (e) including the kelurahan of Pajar Bulan.

== History ==
The history of the Dutch colonial era, during the period of Prince Alif Jaya around 1786, built a large guesthouse in Liwa. In 1899, the Sultan of Merah Dani from the holy land, after returning from the pilgrimage, visited Constantinople, Istanbul. Prince Dalom Merah Dani told the Ottoman Sultan that he was from an Islamic Kingdom. Sumatra, whose ancestors came from the northern coastal land of Sumatra, then the Prince was received by the Ottoman Sultan, the Prince was awarded with a Kiswah.

West Lampung Regency was formed from the division of North Lampung Regency based on Law no. 6 of 1991. The Regency, which is also known as a cold area, has its capital in Liwa. Prior to being given the status of a separate regency, West Lampung was a district of the regency of North Lampung with the capital city of Liwa. The Governor of Dati I Lampung, Poedjono Pranyoto, to help fight for it at the central level. And thanks to this struggle, the central government finally prepared a bill regarding the establishment of the West Lampung District Dati II. Support was also given by the Regent of North Lampung. By contributing his suggestions to the Lampung Level I Regional Government regarding the candidate for the capital city of West Lampung, which was stated in letter No. PU.000/1232/Bank.LU/1978. The Minister of Home Affairs (Mendagri) which is held by Rudini issued the Instruction of the Minister of Home Affairs No. 17 of 1991, which contains the Instructions for the Implementation of Law No. 6 of 1991. This law contains the establishment of the District Level II West Lampung.

Inauguration of the establishment of West Lampung Regency and at the same time inaugurating the Acting Head of the Level II Regional Head of West Lampung, namely Hakim Saleh Umpu Singa on September 24, 1991. The Minister of Home Affairs of the Republic of Indonesia Rudini received the Customary Coat of Honor from Prince Edward Syah Pernong, since 2012 based on the Law of the Republic of Indonesia Number 22 of 2012 concerning the Establishment of the Pesisir Barat Regency in Lampung Province (State Gazette of the Republic of Indonesia of 2012 Number 231 Supplement to the State Gazette Number 5364), Prior to the birth of the Pesisir Barat Regency based on the above Act, the Pesisir Barat Regency was still included in the administrative area of the Regency of West Lampung. whose district capital is Liwa.

== Gallery ==
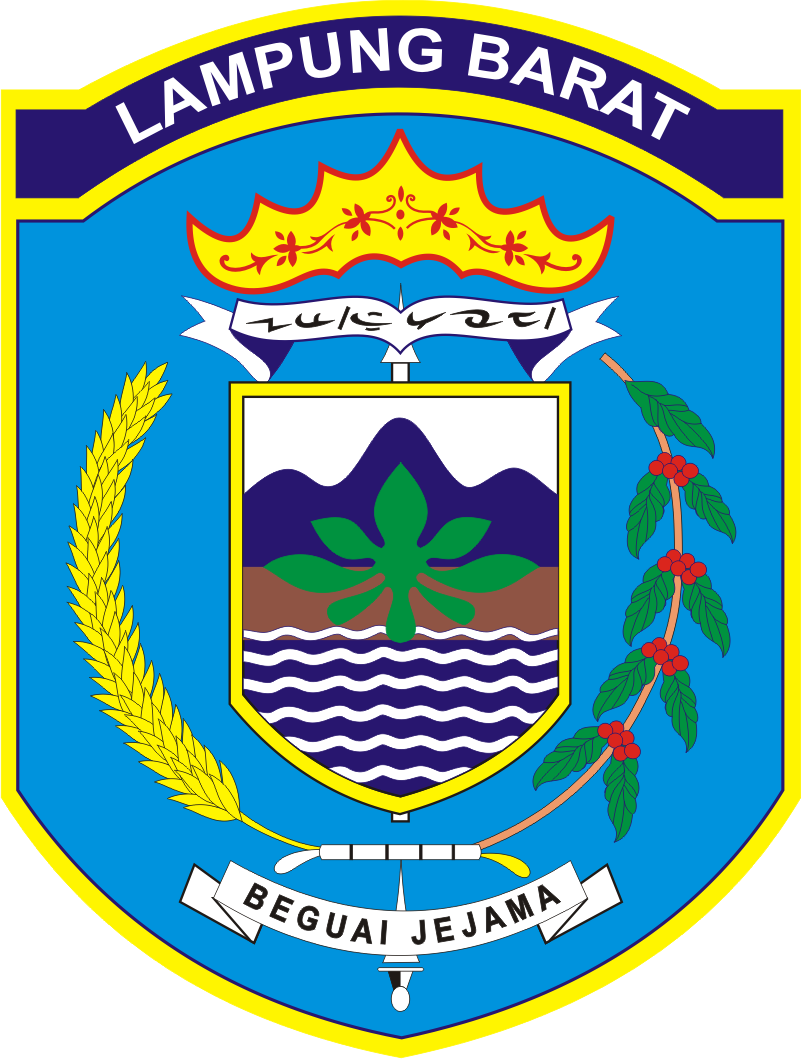
Former emblem of West Lampung Regency, with the creation of Pesisir Barat Regency from the west coastal parts of its territory, this logo was deemed not reflecting the current reality and replaced in 2015. Buka di Goo

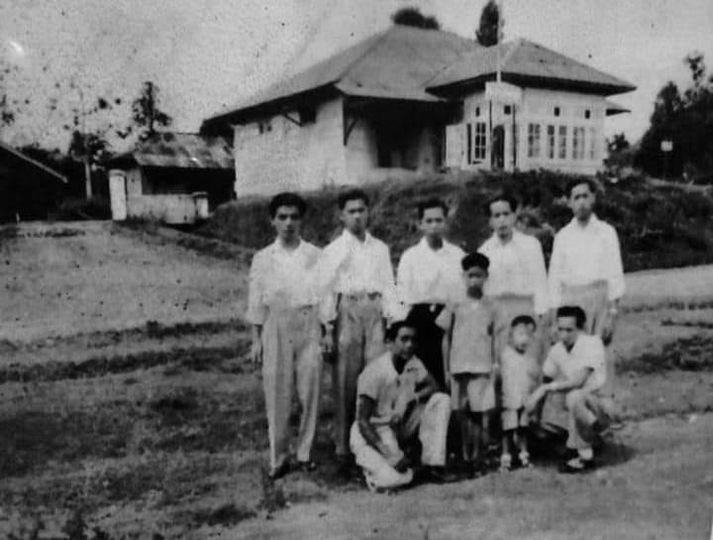
Prince Alif Jaya's Wisma zuriah Pak lang Kepaksian Sekala Brak, Renovated in 1924 during the Dutch colonial period.
