= Lake Singkarak =

Lake in West Sumatra, Indonesia

Singkarak
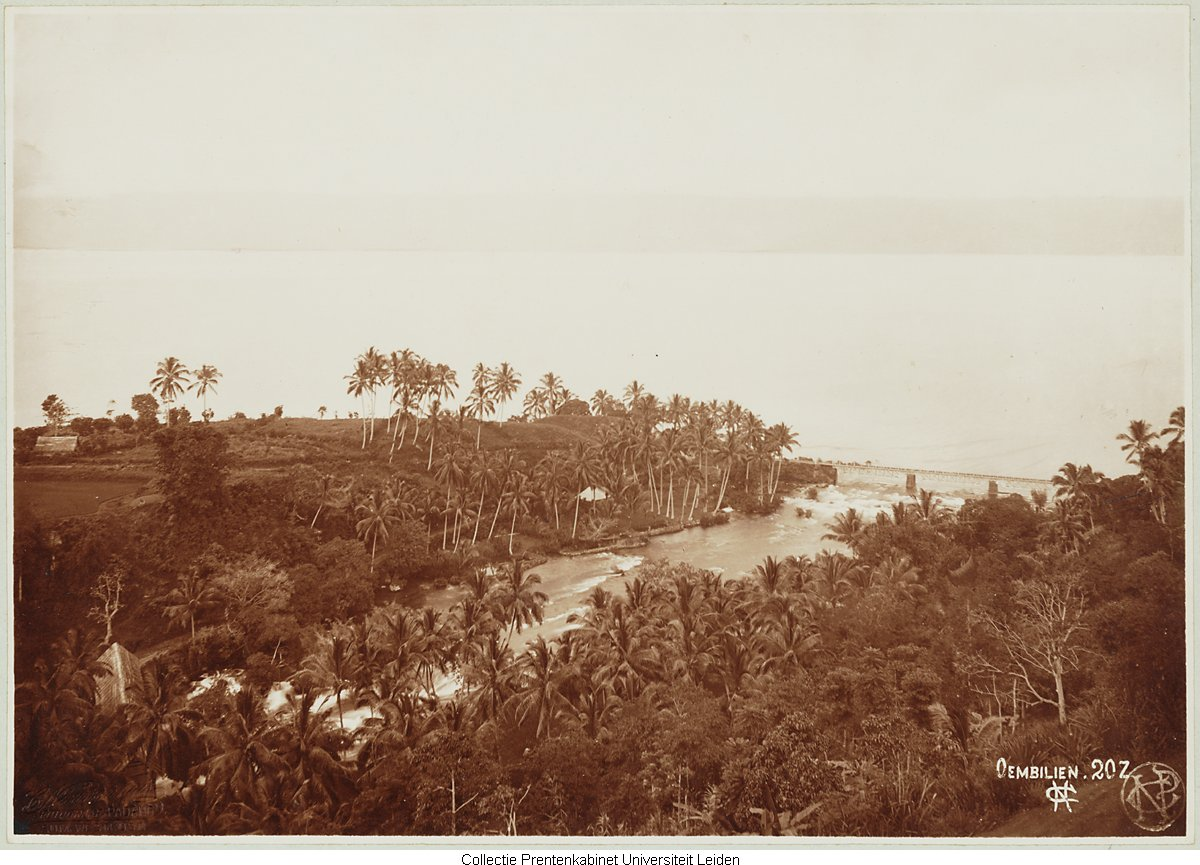
- Lake Singkarak and the Ombilin river circa 1900

- Location within Indonesia Location within Sumatra
- Location: West Sumatra, Indonesia
- Coordinates: 0°37′12″S 100°32′24″E
- Type: Tectonic
- Part of: Indragiri basin
- Primary inflows: Sumani River
- Primary outflows: Ombilin River, Anai River
- Basin countries: Indonesia
- Max. length: 20.77 km (12.91 mi)
- Max. width: 7.23 km (4.49 mi)
- Surface area: 107.8 km^{2} (41.6 sq mi)
- Average depth: 149 m (489 ft)
- Max. depth: 268 m (879 ft)
- Water volume: 16.1 km^{3} (13,100,000 acre⋅ft)
- Surface elevation: 362 m (1,188 ft)

Lake Singkarak (Indonesian: Danau Singkarak) is a lake in West Sumatra, Indonesia. It is located between the regencies of Tanah Datar and Solok Regency. It has an area of 107.8 km^{2}, being approximately 21 km long and 7 km wide. The natural outlet for excess water is the Ombilin River which flows eastward to the Strait of Malacca. A hydroelectric project, however, has diverted most of the lake outflow to the Anai River which flows westward into the Indian Ocean near Padang. This Singkarak power station uses this water to generate power for the West Sumatra and Riau provinces. A species of fish called ikan bilih (Mystacoleucus padangensis) is endemic to the lake and is harvested for human consumption. A railway line, which connects Padang and Sawahlunto-Sijunjung, skirts the length of the lake on the eastern side.

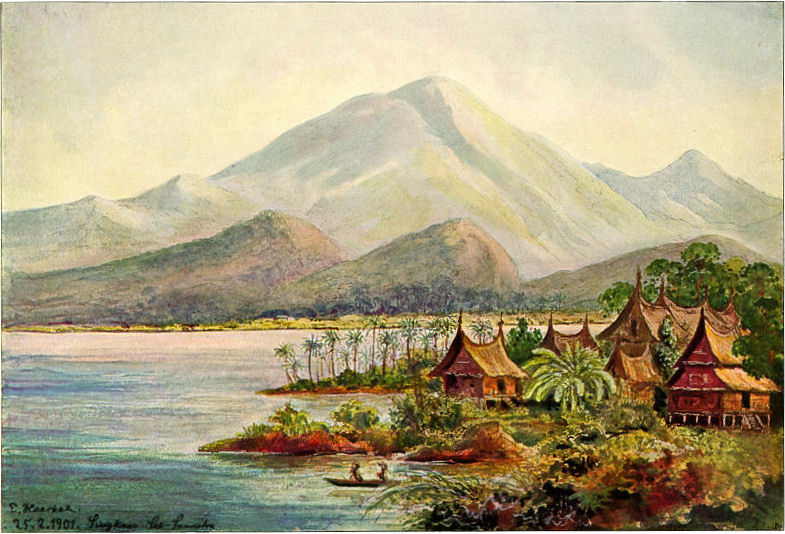
Painting of Lake Singkarak in 1901

== See also ==
- List of lakes of Indonesia
