= 1943 Alahan Panjang earthquakes =

Earthquakes in Indonesia

- Location within Sumatra
- UTC time: Doublet earthquake:
- 1943-06-08 20:42:46
- 1943-06-09 03:06:20
- ISC event
- 899871
- 899872
- USGS-ANSS
- ComCat
- ComCat
- Local date: June 9, 1943
- Local time
- 03:42:46
- 10:06:20
- Magnitude
- M_{s} 7.5
- M_{s} 7.8
- Depth: 15 km (9.3 mi); 10 km (6.2 mi)
- Epicenter: 1.0°S 101.0°E
- Areas affected: Indonesia
- Max. intensity: IX (Destructive) (both events)

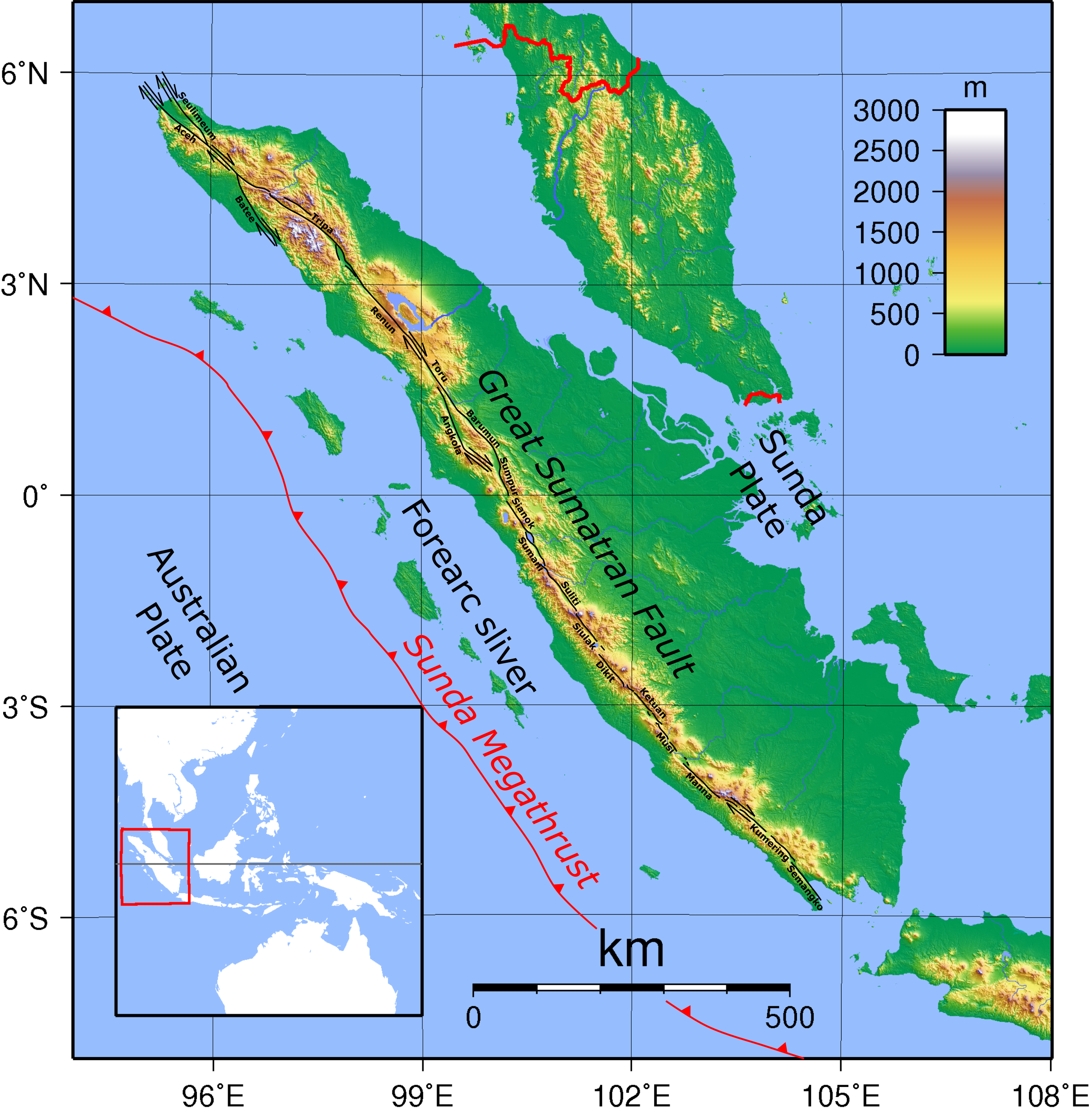
Map of the Great Sumatran Fault with labelled segments

The 1943 Alahan Panjang earthquakes occurred on June 8 and June 9 UTC (June 9, 1943, local time) in Sumatra, then under Japanese occupation. This was an earthquake doublet (the shocks occurred at the same location on consecutive days).

The first mainshock occurred on June 8 at 20:42 UTC. It ruptured the Suliti segment of the Sumatran Fault Zone. The magnitude was given as M_{w} 7.2, or M_{s} 7.1.

The second mainshock occurred on June 9 at 03:06 UTC. It ruptured the Sumani segment of the Sumatran Fault Zone and perhaps the northwestern part of the Suliti segment. The magnitude was given as M_{w} 7.5, or M_{s} 7.4.

Alahan Panjang was damaged in the earthquakes. Right lateral offsets were reported near the town of Solok.

Near the Sumani segment, earthquake doublets occurred repeatedly. Similar earthquake doublet nearby include the earthquakes in 1926 and 2007.

== See also ==
- List of earthquakes in 1943
- List of earthquakes in Indonesia
