= Bachtiar Basri =

Indonesian politician (1953–2025)

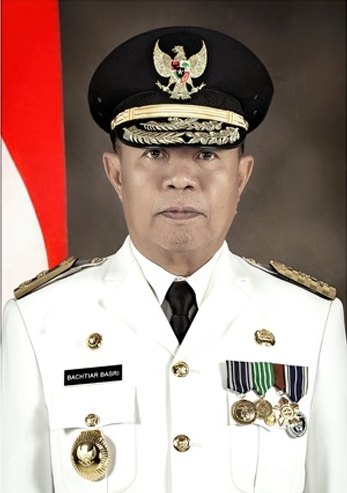

Vice Governor of Lampung
- In office 2 June 2014 – 12 June 2019
- President: Susilo Bambang Yudhoyono; Joko Widodo
- Governor: Muhammad Ridho Ficardo
- Preceded by: Joko Umar Said
- Succeeded by: Chusnunia Chalim

1st Regent of West Tulang Bawang
- In office 14 November 2011 – 2 June 2014
- President: Susilo Bambang Yudhoyono
- Governor: Sjachroedin Zainal Pagaralam
- Lieutenant: Umar Ahmad
- Preceded by: office established
- Succeeded by: Umar Ahmad

Personal details
- Born: 30 December 1953 Tanjung Karang, Indonesia (now Bandar Lampung, Indonesia)
- Died: 15 May 2025 (aged 71) Bandar Lampung, Indonesia
- Spouse: Hasiah
- Children: 5

Bachtiar Basri (30 December 1953 – 15 May 2025) was an Indonesian civil servant and politician who served as the vice-governor of Lampung from 2014 to 2019. Prior to his ascension to the office, he held a number of important positions in the Lampung regional government, including as the governor's expert staff and chief of the province's societal empowerment and governance agency.

== Early life and education ==
Bachtiar Basri was born in Tanjung Karang (now Bandar Lampung) in the Lampung province of Indonesia on 30 December 1953. He completed his primary education at the 5th People's School in Kotabumi, the capital of North Lampung. He completed his secondary education in the same town at a state-owned middle high school and high school in 1969 and 1973, respectively. Basri studied law at the Islamic University of Indonesia in Yogyakarta, where he obtained his undergraduate degree in 1979. He later completed a master's program in management at the Bandar Lampung University in 2001.

== Career ==
Basri began his career in Central Lampung, serving as the regional government's general counsel since 10 November 1983. During his tenure, he also held office as the acting chief of services in the region's civil registration agency on 1 November 1984. He was then transferred to North Lampung, serving as the acting chief of social welfare and regional development since 27 December 1986. Four years later, on 8 June 1990 he was appointed the chief of the Sumber Jaya subdistrict in West Lampung.

Basri’s responsibilities expanded as he assumed higher-level positions. He was appointed the third assistant to the regional secretary of West Lampung on 1 February 1995, before receiving a minor promotion as the chief of Central Lampung's regional revenue office on 5 December that year. He was then returned to North Lampung where he served as the chief of the regional supervision agency and regional secretary. Around 1998, he briefly served as the acting regent of North Lampung during the transition from Ahmad Gumbira to Hairi Fasyah.

After years of service in subregional units in Lampung, Basri was transferred to the Lampung provincial government, serving as the expert staff for Lampung's governor Syamsurya Ryacudu. Around this period, Basri ran as a candidate for the regent of North Lampung, but he lost by 1,482 votes to deputy regent Zainal Abidin. After governor Sjachroedin Zainal Pagaralam was re-elected for a second term, Pagaralam appointed Basri as the chief of the social empowerment and rural government agency on 3 June 2009.

On 19 October 2009, Basri assumed office as the acting regent of West Tulang Bawang, replacing Syaifullah Sesunan. His appointment was faced with opposition from the association of Lampung teacher, who refused Sesunan to be replaced as they felt comfortable with his leadership. Nevertheless, governor Zainal Pagaralam persisted, and Basri assumed office five days later. His acting term was extended once, until he resigned on 9 June 2011 in order to compete in the West Tulang Bawang regional election. Basri, running with politician Umar Ahmad, was supported by Golkar, Democratic Party, Prosperous Justice Party, and the National Awakening Party in the election. He won the election by 67,823 votes and was installed on 14 November 2011. During his tenure, Basri appointed two subdistrict chiefs in the regency and oversaw road widening efforts. He also opposed capital punishment for corrupt officials, doubting its effectiveness in deterring corruptions.

Several years into his term as regent, Bachtiar Basri ran in the 2014 Lampung gubernatorial election as the vice gubernatorial candidate of Muhammad Ridho Ficardo. Their ticket was supported by the Democratic Party and the Prosperous Justice Party. Throughout the pre-campaign and campaign periods, the pair faced intensified scrutiny and negative campaigning, especially at Ridho Ficardo's age and lack of government experience. Nevertheless, this pressure placed the ticket in the public spotlight, possibly contributing to voter interest and empathy. The pair maintained an elevated profile throughout the campaign phase through an extensive use of visual materials—banners, stickers, and leaflets—which blanketed urban centers and reached into rural communities. Eventually, the ticket won the election by 1,816,533 votes, or 44.96% of the total vote. The pair was installed on 2 June 2014, and Bachtiar was replaced by Umar Ahmad as regent twenty-two days later.

As vice governor, Bachtiar represented the governor in a number of key events, including installing members of the Lampung public information committee and delivering the government's proposal of Lampung budget to the provincial parliament in 2015, In the same year, the pair was sued by activist Ricky Tamba for failing to fulfill their promises. Basri joined the National Mandate Party in 2017 as the chairman of the Lampung chapter of the party.

He served for a single term and was replaced by Chusnunia Chalim on 12 June 2019. Upon his retirement, Basri led the campaign team for Rahmat Mirzani Djausal and Jihan Nurlela in the 2024 Lampung gubernatorial election.

== Personal life and death ==
Basri was married to Hasiah and had five children.

Basri died at the Abdoel Moeloek Central Hospital in Bandar Lampung, on the afternoon 15 May 2025. He was 71. Several hours prior to his death, Basri experienced severe chest pain and was diagnosed with vascular injury in his main blood vessel. His body was laid in place at a funeral home in Kotabumi before being interred in the town.
