= Umar Ahmad =

Indonesian politician (born 1980)

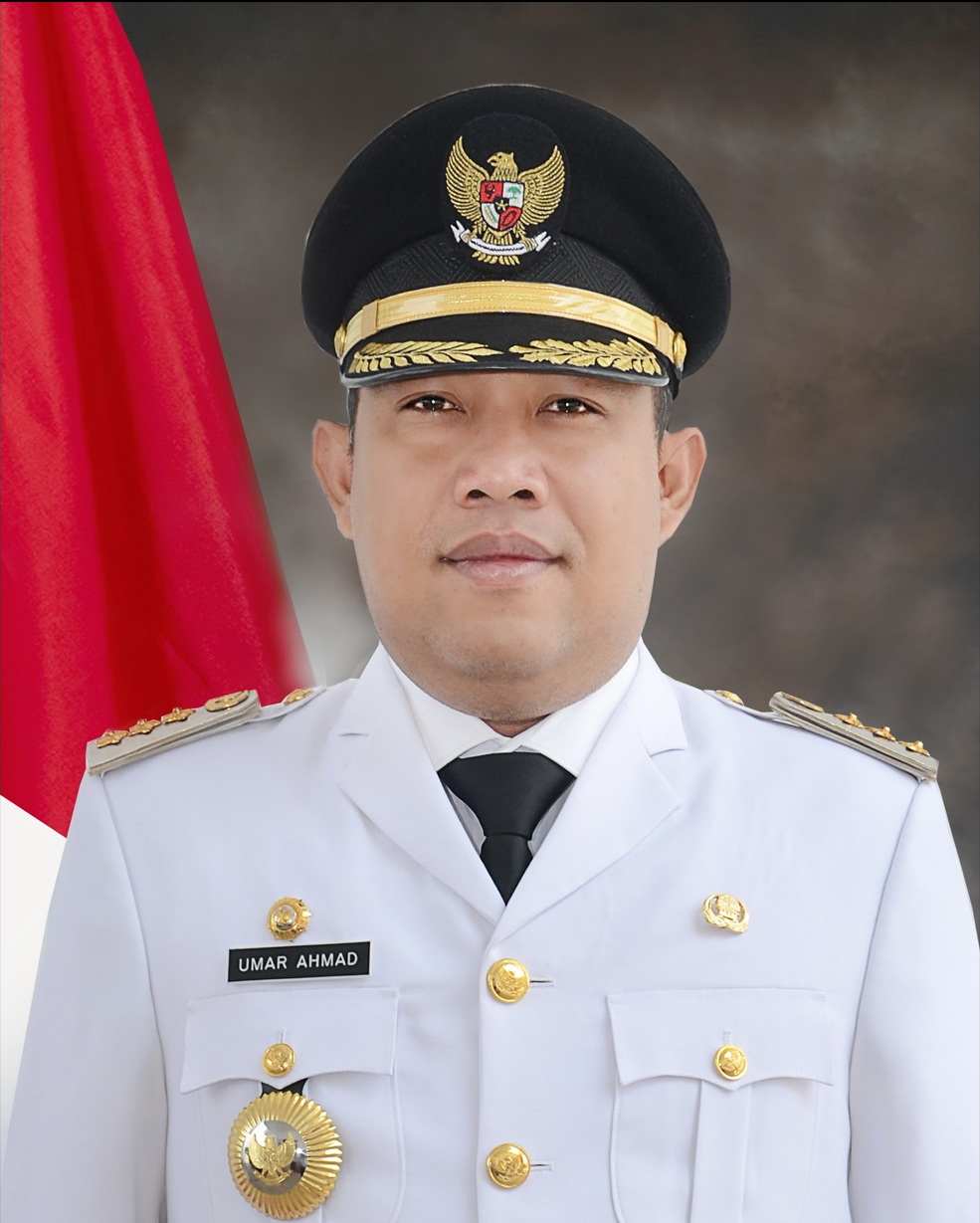

Regent of West Tulang Bawang
- In office 22 May 2017 – 22 May 2022
- In office 24 June 2014 – 14 November 2016
- Preceded by: Bachtiar Basri
- Succeeded by: Novriwan Jaya

Vice Regent of West Tulang Bawang
- In office 14 November 2011 – 24 May 2014
- Preceded by: Position created
- Succeeded by: Fauzi Hasan

Personal details
- Born: 12 October 1980 (age 45) North Lampung, Lampung, Indonesia

Umar Ahmad (born 12 October 1980) is an Indonesian politician of the Indonesian Democratic Party of Struggle. He served as the regent of West Tulang Bawang Regency from 2014 to 2016 and 2017 to 2022. He had previously served as vice regent under Bachtiar Basri from 2011 to 2014.

== Early life ==
Umar Ahmad was born on 12 October 1980 in Tulang Bawang Udik district, in present-day West Tulang Bawang Regency (then part of North Lampung Regency). He remained in his home district until he completed high school in 1998, when he studied agricultural socioeconomics at the University of Lampung (Unila) at the provincial capital of Bandar Lampung. He received his bachelor's degree in 2004. During his studies at Unila, he became chairman of the students' association.

== Career ==
Ahmad's family had been a member of the Indonesian Democratic Party of Struggle, and in the 2004 legislative election he ran as the party's candidate for Tulang Bawang Regency's municipal legislature. Within the party, he had become secretary of its West Tulang Bawang branch by 2010. He then became speaker of West Tulang Bawang's local legislature following its formation. In 2011, Ahmad became the running mate of Bachtiar Basri in West Tulang Bawang's first regency election, and the pair was elected after winning 67,823 votes (43.8%) a four-way race. Basri and Ahmad were sworn in on 14 November 2011.

=== Regent ===
On 24 June 2014, Ahmad was appointed regent of West Tulang Bawang to replace Basri, who had been elected as Vice Governor of Lampung. He would run for a second, full term in the 2017 regency election as a single candidate, securing 96.8 percent of the votes against the blank box option. With Fauzi Hasan as vice regent, Ahmad was sworn in for his second term on 22 May 2017.

As regent, Ahmad called for the expansion of palm oil cultivation in West Tulang Bawang (which covered around 7,000 hectares by 2020), and promoted the household processing of cassava and natural rubber.

After his tenure as regent ended, Ahmad registered to run in the 2024 Lampung gubernatorial election. He ultimately did not run, however, and instead endorsed Arinal Djunaidi.

== Family ==
Ahmad is married to Kornelia, and the couple has two children. His younger brother, Nadirsyah, took part in West Tulang Bawang's 2024 regency election as Novriwan Jaya's running mate, and was elected for the 2025–2030 term.
