= 2018 Indonesian local elections =

Local elections in Indonesia

- 27 June 2018

17 governors, 39 mayors, and 115 regents
Leadership before election
See #Elections
Elected Leadership
See #Elections

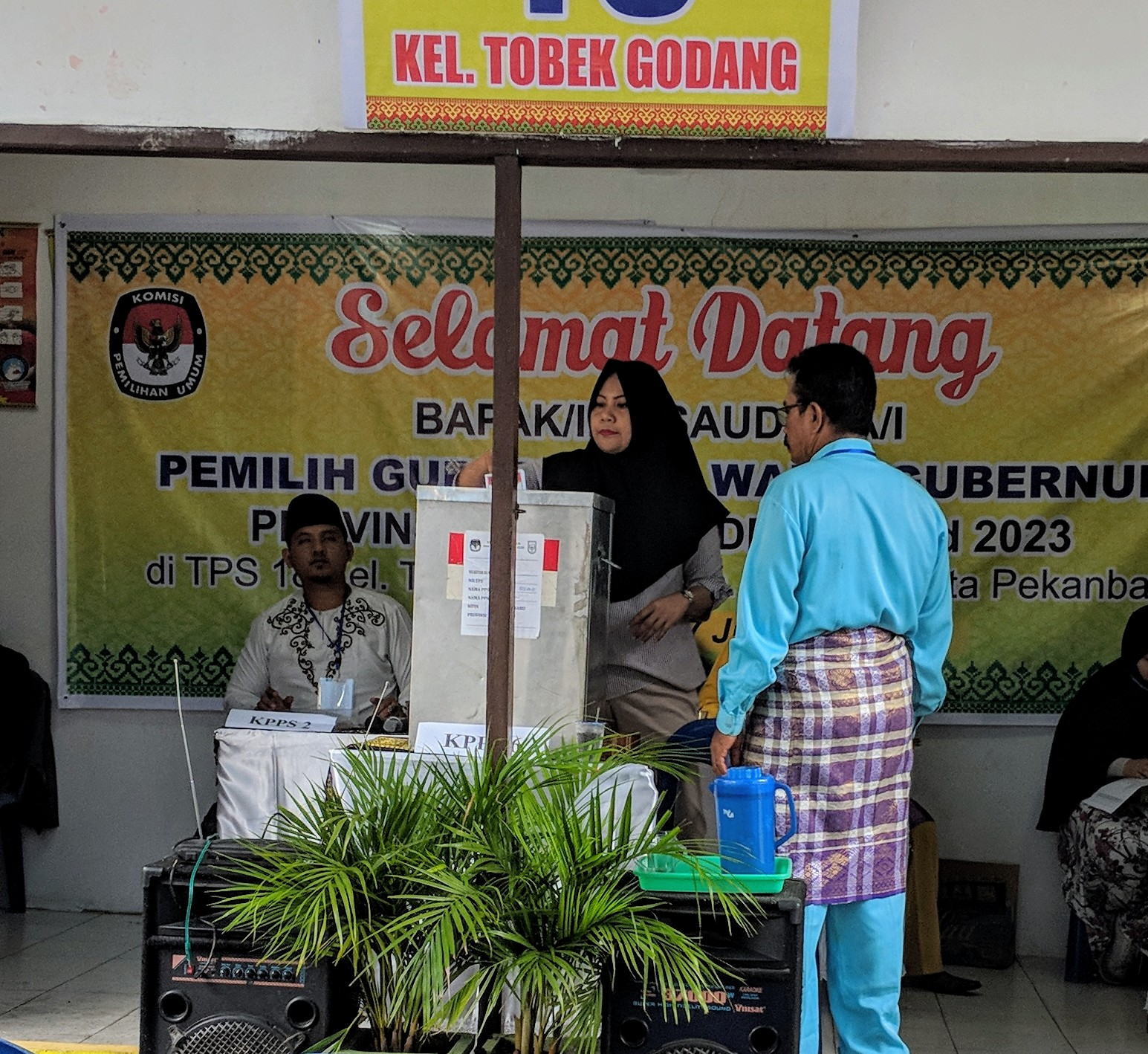
A voter submitting her ballot at a polling station in Pekanbaru, Riau

Local elections (Indonesian: Pemilihan Kepala Daerah or Pilkada) were held in Indonesia on 27 June 2018. Voters elected 17 governors, 39 mayors and 115 regents across the country. The elections included gubernatorial elections for Indonesia's four most populous provinces: West Java, East Java, Central Java and North Sumatra.

Like other local elections in Indonesia (except for Jakarta), the elections followed a simple plurality, first-past-the-post system where the candidates with the most votes automatically wins the seat even if they have less than 50% of the votes.

== Background ==
Simultaneous local elections (Pilkada Serentak) was first held in Indonesia on 2015. The country held another simultaneous regional election in 2017, making the 2018 election the third. The next set of regional elections are set to be held in 2020 and 2024, the latter one being simultaneous with the presidential and legislative elections. It is also planned that regional offices with elections in 2017 and 2018 are to be held by centrally appointed officials starting from the end of their five-year terms until the 2024 elections.

It has been described as a run-up to the 2019 national elections, due to the fact that the three most populous provinces in the country (West Java, East Java and Central Java) hosting 48 percent of voters in 2014 are to vote, with the elections covering 31 provinces altogether. 152 million of the country's 260 million citizens were eligible to vote in the elections. Some observers also described the election as a follow-up to the 2017 elections, particularly the Jakartan election where Gerindra and PKS-backed Anies Baswedan defeated Basuki Tjahaja Purnama, commonly seen as president Joko Widodo's ally. The Indonesian National Police identified several provinces as being prone to conflicts arising from the results of the elections, namely North Sumatra, West Java, East Java, South Sulawesi, and Papua.

== Schedule ==
Preparations of the elections began in 2017, with the KPU receiving demographic data by 31 July 2017 and forming local committees by October. Finalization of the voter list was done by 31 December 2017 and registration for candidates opened the following day, closing at 10 January. For regions where only a single candidate were registered, 3 additional days were allocated between the 14 and 16 January 2018 for extended registration. The campaigning period was to officially start on 15 February 2018 and end by 24 June. The actual voting took place on 27 June.

According to the KPU, the election would cost an estimated Rp 10.5 trillion (US$735 million). The day of the election (27 June) was made into a national holiday by the government on 25 June.

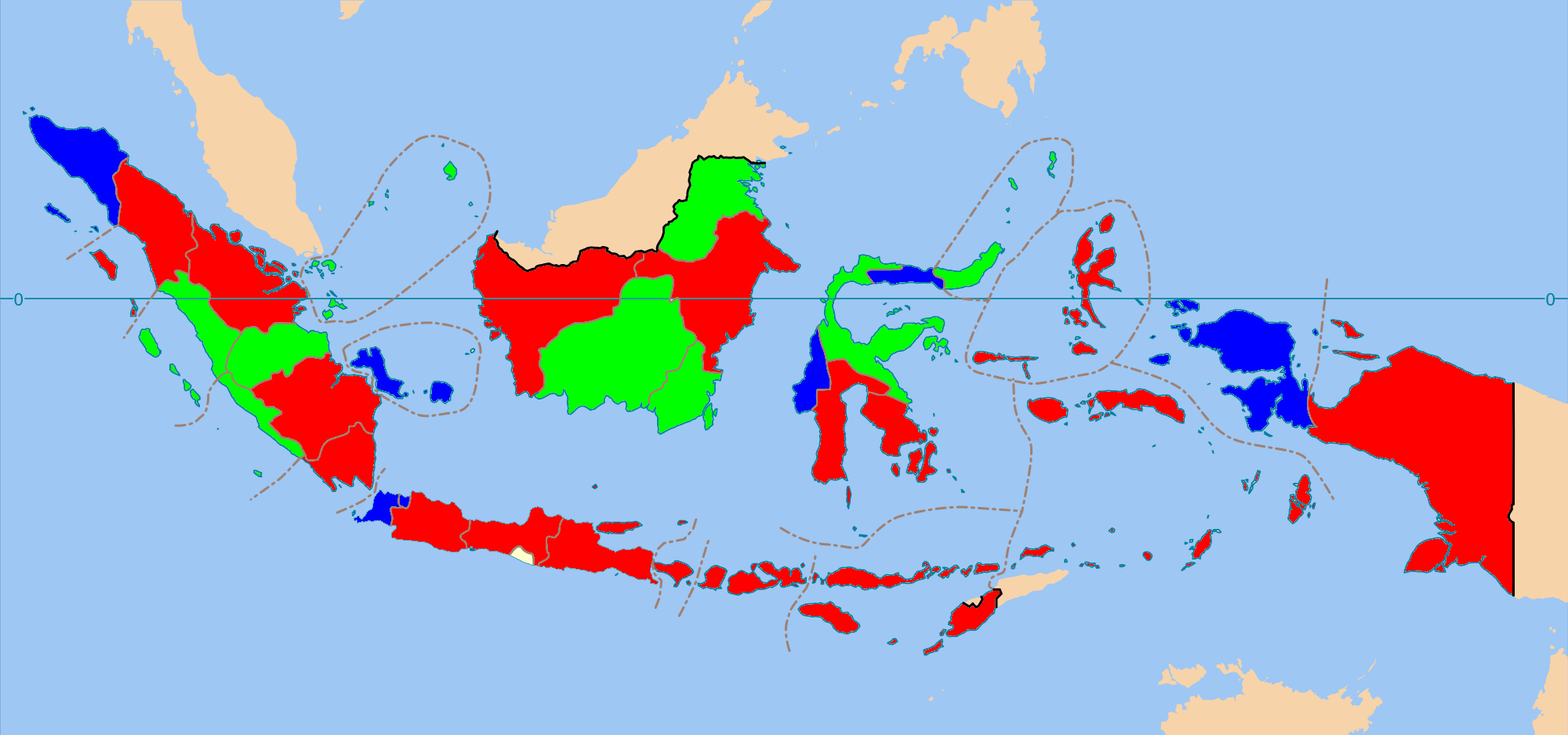
Map of the gubernatorial elections by year. Provinces in red held gubernatorial elections in 2018.

== Elections ==
=== Gubernatorial ===
| Province | Incumbent | Winner (Note: According to KPU real count results) | Population (2010 census) | Notes |
|---|---|---|---|---|
| North Sumatra | Tengku Erry Nuradi (Golkar) | Edy Rahmayadi | 12,982,204 | details |
| Riau | Arsyadjuliandi Rachman (Golkar) | Syamsuar | 5,538,367 | details |
| South Sumatra | Alex Noerdin (Golkar) | Herman Deru | 7,450,394 | details |
| Lampung | Muhammad Ridho Ficardo (Demokrat) | Arinal Djunaidi | 7,608,405 | details |
| West Java | Ahmad Heryawan (PKS) | Ridwan Kamil | 43,053,732 | details |
| Central Java | Ganjar Pranowo (PDI-P) | | 32,382,657 | details |
| East Java | Soekarwo (Demokrat) | Khofifah Indar Parawansa | 37,476,757 | details |
| Bali | I Made Mangku Pastika (Demokrat) | I Wayan Koster | 3,890,757 | details |
| West Nusa Tenggara | Muhammad Zainul Majdi (Demokrat) | Zulkieflimansyah | 4,500,212 | details |
| East Nusa Tenggara | Frans Lebu Raya (PDI-P) | Viktor Laiskodat | 4,683,827 | details |
| West Kalimantan | Cornelis (PDI-P) | Sutarmidji | 4,395,983 | details |
| East Kalimantan | Awang Faroek Ishak (Golkar) | Isran Noor | 3,553,143 | details |
| South Sulawesi | Syahrul Yasin Limpo (Golkar) | Nurdin Abdullah | 8,034,776 | details |
| Southeast Sulawesi | Teguh Setyabudi (PAN) | Ali Mazi | 2,232,586 | |
| Maluku | Said Assagaff (Golkar) | Murad Ismail | 1,533,506 | |
| North Maluku | Abdul Ghani Kasuba (PKS) | | 1,038,087 | |
| Papua | Lukas Enembe (Demokrat) | | 2,833,381 | details |

Note: name in italics indicate incumbents who ran for re-election

=== Mayoral ===
| City | Province | Incumbent | Notes |
|---|---|---|---|
| Serang | Banten | Tubagus Haerul Jaman | |
| Tangerang | Banten | Arief Rachadiono | single candidate |
| Bengkulu | Bengkulu | Helmi Hasan | |
| Gorontalo | Gorontalo | Marten A Taha | |
| Jambi | Jambi | Syarif Fasha | |
| Bekasi | West Java | Rahmat Effendi | |
| Cirebon | West Java | Nasrudin Azis | |
| Bandung | West Java | Ridwan Kamil | details |
| Banjar | West Java | Ade Uu Sukaesih | |
| Bogor | West Java | Bima Arya Sugiarto | |
| Tegal | Central Java | Siti Masitha Soeparno | |
| Malang | East Java | Mochammad Anton | |
| Mojokerto | East Java | Mas'ud Yunus | |
| Probolinggo | East Java | Rukmini Buchori | |
| Kediri | East Java | Abdullah Abu Bakar | |
| Madiun | East Java | Sugeng Rismiyanto | |
| Pontianak | West Kalimantan | Sutarmidji | |
| Palangkaraya | Central Kalimantan | Muhammad Riban Satia | |
| Tarakan | North Kalimantan | Sofian Raga | |
| Pangkal Pinang | Bangka Belitung Islands | Muhammad Irwansyah | |
| Tanjung Pinang | Riau Islands | Lis Darmansyah | |
| Tual | Maluku | Adam Rahayaan | |
| Subulussalam | Aceh | Merah Sakti Kombih | |
| Bima | West Nusa Tenggara | Qurais H Abidin | |
| Palopo | South Sulawesi | Muhammad Judas Amir | |
| Makassar | South Sulawesi | Mohammad Ramdhan Pomanto | details single candidate |
| Baubau | Southeast Sulawesi | Abdul Sajid Tamrin | |
| Kotamobagu | North Sulawesi | Tatong Bara | |
| Sawahlunto | West Sumatra | Ali Yusuf | |
| Padangpanjang | West Sumatra | Hendri Arnis | |
| Pariaman | West Sumatra | Mukhlis Rahman | |
| Padang | West Sumatra | Mahyeldi Ansharullah | |
| Lubuklinggau | South Sumatra | Abdul Sajid Tamrin | |
| Pagar Alam | South Sumatra | Ida Fitriati | |
| Prabumulih | South Sumatra | Ridho Yahya | |
| Palembang | South Sumatra | Harnojoyo | |
| Padang Sidempuan | North Sumatra | Andar Amin Harahap | |

=== Regent ===
Aceh

| Regency | Results |
|---|---|
| South Aceh | 1. Tgk Husen Yusuf-Mustafril; 2. H Azwir-Tgk Amran; 3. Zulkarnaini-M. Jasa; 4. Darman-Baital Makmur; 5. HT Sama Indra-H Harmaini; 6. H Mirwan-Zirwan; 7. H Karman-Afdhal Yasin |
| Pidie Jaya | 1. Yusri Yusuf-Saifulah; 2. H Aiyub Abbas-H Said Mulyadi; 3. Muhibuddin Husen-HM Yusuf Ibrahim; 4. Muhammad Yusuf-H Anwar Ishak |

North Sumatera

| Regency | Results | Notes |
|---|---|---|
| Batu Bara | 1. Harry Nugroho-Muhammad Syafii; 2. Darwis-Janmat Sembiring; 3. Zahir-Oky; 4. Khairil Anwar-Sofyan Alwi | |
| Dairi | 1. Depriwanto Sitohang-Azhar Bintang; 2. Edy Kelleng Ate Beritu-Jimmy Andrea Lukita | |
| Deli Serdang | | |
| Langkat | 1. Terbit Rencana PA-Syah Afandin; 2. Rudi Hartono Bangun-Budiono | |
| Padang Lawas | 1. Tondi Roni Tua-Syarifuddin Hasibuan; 2. Ali Sutan Harahap-Ahmad Zarnawi Pasaribu; 3. Rahmad Pardamean Hasibuan-Syahrul Effendi Hasibuan | |
| North Padang Lawas | 1. Andar Amin Harahap-Hariro Harahap; 2. Empty Candidate | single candidate |
| North Tapanuli | 1. Nikson Nababan-Sarlandy Hutabarat; 2. Jonius Taripar Hutabarat-Frengky P Simanjuntak; 3. Chrismanto Lumbantobing-Hotman P Hutasoit | |

Riau

| Regency | Results |
|---|---|
| Indragiri Hilir | 1. Rosman Malomo-Musmulyadi; 2. Ramli Walid-Ali Azhar; 3. M Wardan-Syamsuddin Uti |

Jambi

| Regency | Results |
|---|---|
| Kerinci | 1. Monadi-Edison; 2. Adirozal-Ami Taher; 3. Zainal-Arsal |
| Merangin | 1. Fauzi-Sujarmin; 2. Al Haris-Mashuri; 3. Nalim-Khafid |

South Sumatera

| Regency | Results |
|---|---|
| Banyuasin | 1. Agus Yudiantoro- Hazuar Bidui AZ; 2. Arkoni MD-Azwar Hamid; 3. Husni Tahmrin-Supartijo; 4. Syaiful Bakhri-Agus Salam; 5. Askolani Jasi-Slamet |
| Empat Lawang | 1. Davit Hardiyanto-Eduar Kohar; 2. Joncik Muhamad- Yulius Maulana |
| Lahat | 1. Nopran Marjani-Herliansyah; 2. Hapit Padli-Erlansyah Rumsyah; 3. Cik Ujang-Haryanto; 4. Bursah Zarnubi-Parhan Berza; 5. Purnawarman Kias-Rozi Adiansyah |
| Muara Enim | 1. Syamsul Bahri-Hanan; 2. Nurul Aman-Thamrin; 3. Shinta Paramita-Syuryadi; 4. Ahmad Yani-Juarsah |
| Ogan Komering Ilir | 1. Iskandar-Djakfar Sodiq; 2. Abdiyanto Fikri-Made Indrawan; 3. Azhari Effendi-Qomarus Zaman |

Bangka Belitung Islands

| Regency | Results |
|---|---|
| Bangka | 1. Tarmizi H. Saat-Amri Cahyadi; 2. Mulkan-Syahbudin; 3. Danial-Fadillah Sabri |
| Belitung | 1. Azwardy Azhar-Erwandi A Rani; 2. Hellyana-Junaidi Rachman; 3. Andi Lanna-Zulfriandi Afan; 4. Sahani Saleh-Isyak Meirobie |

Lampung

| Regency | Results |
|---|---|
| North Lampung | 1. Zainal Abidin-Yusrizal; 2. Aprozi Alam-Ice Suryana; 3. Agung Ilmu Mangkunegara-Budi Utomo |
| Tanggamus | 1. Dewi Handajani-A.M. Syafi'i; 2. Samsul Hadi-Nuzul Irsan |

Banten

| Regency | Results | Notes |
|---|---|---|
| Lebak | 1. Iti Octavia Jayabaya-Ade Sumardi ( %); 2. Empty Candidate ( %) | single candidate |
| Tangerang | 1. Ahmed Zaki Iskandar-Mad Romli ( %); 2. Empty Candidate ( %) | single candidate |

West Java

| Regency | Results |
|---|---|
| Cirebon | |
| Purwakarta | |
| West Bandung | |
| Sumedang | |
| Kuningan | |
| Majalengka | |
| Subang | |
| Bogor | details |
| Garut | |
| Ciamis | |

Central Java

| Regency | Results |
|---|---|
| Banyumas | 1. Mardjoko-Ifan Haryanto ( %); 2. Achmad Husein-Sadewo Tri Lastiono ( %). |
| Temanggung | 1. Bambang Sukarno - Matoha. ( %); 2. Haryo Dewandono - Irawan Prasetyadi. ( %); 3. HM Al Khadziq - R Heri Ibnu Wibowo. ( %) |
| Kudus | 1. Masan-Noor Yasin ( %); 2. Noor Hartoyo-Junaidi ( %); 3. Sri Hartini-Setia Budi Wibawa ( %); 4. Akhwan-Hadi Sucipto ( %); 5. M Tamzil-Hartopo ( %) |
| Karanganyar | 1. Juliyatmono-Rober Christanto ( %); 2. Rohadi Widodo-Ida Retno Wahyuningsih ( %) |
| Tegal (details) | 1. Rusbandi-Fatkhudin ( %); 2. Haron Bagas-Drajat ( %); 3. Enthus Susmono-Umi Azizah ( %) |
| Magelang | 1. Zaenal Arifin-Edy Cahyana ( %); 2. Zaenal Arifin-Rohadi Pratoto ( %) |

East Java

| Regency | Results | Notes |
|---|---|---|
| Sampang | 1. Slamet Junaidi-Abdullah Hidayat ( %); 2. Hermanto Subaidi-Suparto ( %); 3. Hisan-Abdullah Mansyur ( %) | |
| Bangkalan | 1. Farid Alfauzi-Sudarmawan ( %); 2. Imam Bukhori-Mondir Rofii ( %); 3. Abdul Latif Amin Imron-Mohni ( %) | |
| Bojonegoro | 1. Soehadi Moeljono-Mitroatin( %); 2. Mahfudoh Suyoto-Kuswiyanto ( %); 3. Anna Muawanah-Budi Irawanto ( %); 4. Basuki-Pudji Dewanto ( %) | |
| Nganjuk | 1. Novi Rahman Hidayat-Marhaen Djumadi ( %); 2. Siti Nurhayati-Bimantoro Wiyono ( %); 3. Desy Natalia Widya-Ainul Yakin (%) | |
| Pamekasan | 1. Baddrut Tamam-Rajae (%); 2. Kholilurrahman-Fathorrahman (%) | |
| Tulungagung | 1. Margiono-Eko Prisdianto; 2. Syahri Mulyo-Maryoto Bhirowo | |
| Pasuruan | 1. M Irsyad Yusuf-Mujib Imron; 2. Empty Candidate | single candidate |
| Magetan | 1. Suyatni Priasmoro-Nur Wahkid; 2. Miratul Mukminin-Joko Suyono; 3. Suprawoto-Nanik Endang Rusminiarti | |
| Madiun | 1. Ahmad Dawami Ragil Saputra-Hari Wuryanto; 2 Rio Wing Dinaryhadi-Sukiman; 3. Djoko Setiono-Suprapto. | |
| Lumajang | 1. Thoriqul Haq-Indah Amperawati; 2. As'at-Thoriq; 3. Rofik Abidin-Nurul Huda | |
| Bondowoso | 1. Salwa Arifin-Irwan Bachtiar; 2. Dhafir-Dayat. | |
| Jombang | 1. Mundjidah-Sumrambah; 2. Nyono-Subaidi; 3. Syafiin-Choirul | |
| Probolinggo | 1. Puput Tantriana Sari-Timbul Prihanjoko; 2. Abdul Malik Haramain-Muzayyan Badri | |

Bali

| Regency | Results |
|---|---|
| Gianyar | 1. Tjokorda Raka Kerthyasa-Pande Istri Maharani Prima Dewi (%); 2. I Made Mahayastra-Anak Agung Gde Mayun (%) |
| Klungkung | 1. Tjokorda Bagus Oka-I Ketut Mandia; 2. I Nyoman Suwirta-I Made Kasta |

West Nusa Tenggara

| Regency | Results |
|---|---|
| West Lombok | |
| East Lombok | |

East Nusa Tenggara

| Regency | Results |
|---|---|
| Sikka (details) | |
| Central Sumba | |
| Nagekeo | |
| Rote Ndao | |
| East Manggarai | |
| South Central Timor | |
| Alor | |
| Kupang | |
| Ende | |
| Southwest Sumba | |

West Kalimantan

| Regency | Results |
|---|---|
| North Kayong | |
| Sanggau | |
| Kubu Raya | |
| Pontianak | |

Central Kalimantan

| Regency | Results |
|---|---|
| Sukamara | |
| Lamandau | |
| Seruyan | |
| Katingan | |
| Pulang Pisau | |
| Murung Raya | |
| East Barito | |
| North Barito | |
| Gunung Mas | |
| Kapuas | |

South Kalimantan

| Regency | Results |
|---|---|
| Tapin | |
| South Hulu Sungai | |
| Tanah Laut | |
| Tabalong | |

East Kalimantan

| Regency | Results |
|---|---|
| Penajam North Paser | 1. Mustaqim-Sofyan Nur; 2. Andi Harahap-Fadly Imawan (Ahli); 3. Abdul Gafur Mas'ud-Hamdam |

North Sulawesi

| Regency | Results |
|---|---|
| Minahasa | |
| North Bolaang Mongondow | |
| Sitaro | |
| Southeast Minahasa | |
| Talaud Islands | |

Central Sulawesi

| Regency | Results |
|---|---|
| Morowali | |
| Parigi Moutong | |
| Donggala | |

West Sulawesi

| Regency | Results |
|---|---|
| Polewali Mandar | |

South Sulawesi

| Regency | Results |
|---|---|
| Bone | |
| Sinjai | |
| Bantaeng | |
| Enrekang | |
| Siddereng Rapang | |
| Jeneponto | |
| Wajo | |
| Luwu | |
| Pinrang | |

Southeast Sulawesi

| Regency | Results |
|---|---|
| Kolaka | 1. Ahmad Safei-Muhammad Jayadin; 2. Asmani Arif-Syahrul Beddu |

Maluku

| Regency | Results |
|---|---|
| Southeast Maluku | 1. Angky Renyaan-Hamsa Rahayaan; 2. Esebius Utha Savsavubun-Abdul Rachman Matdoan; 3. Taher Hanubun-Petrus Beruatwarin |

Papua

| Regency | Results |
|---|---|
| Central Mambramo | |
| Paniai | |
| Puncak | |
| Deiyai | |
| Jayawijaya | |
| Biak Numfor | |
| Mimika | |

== Gallery ==
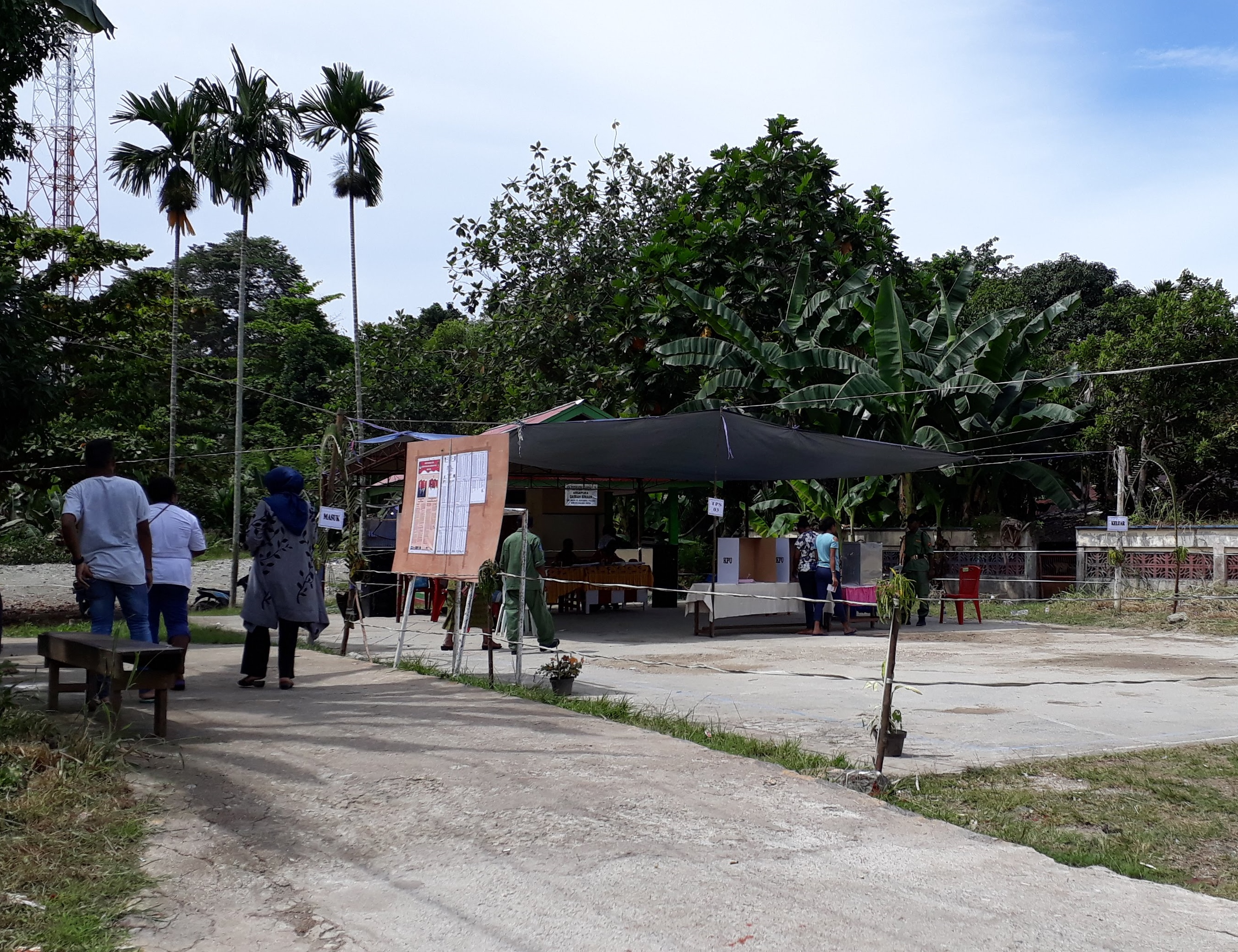
Polling station in Jayapura, Papua.

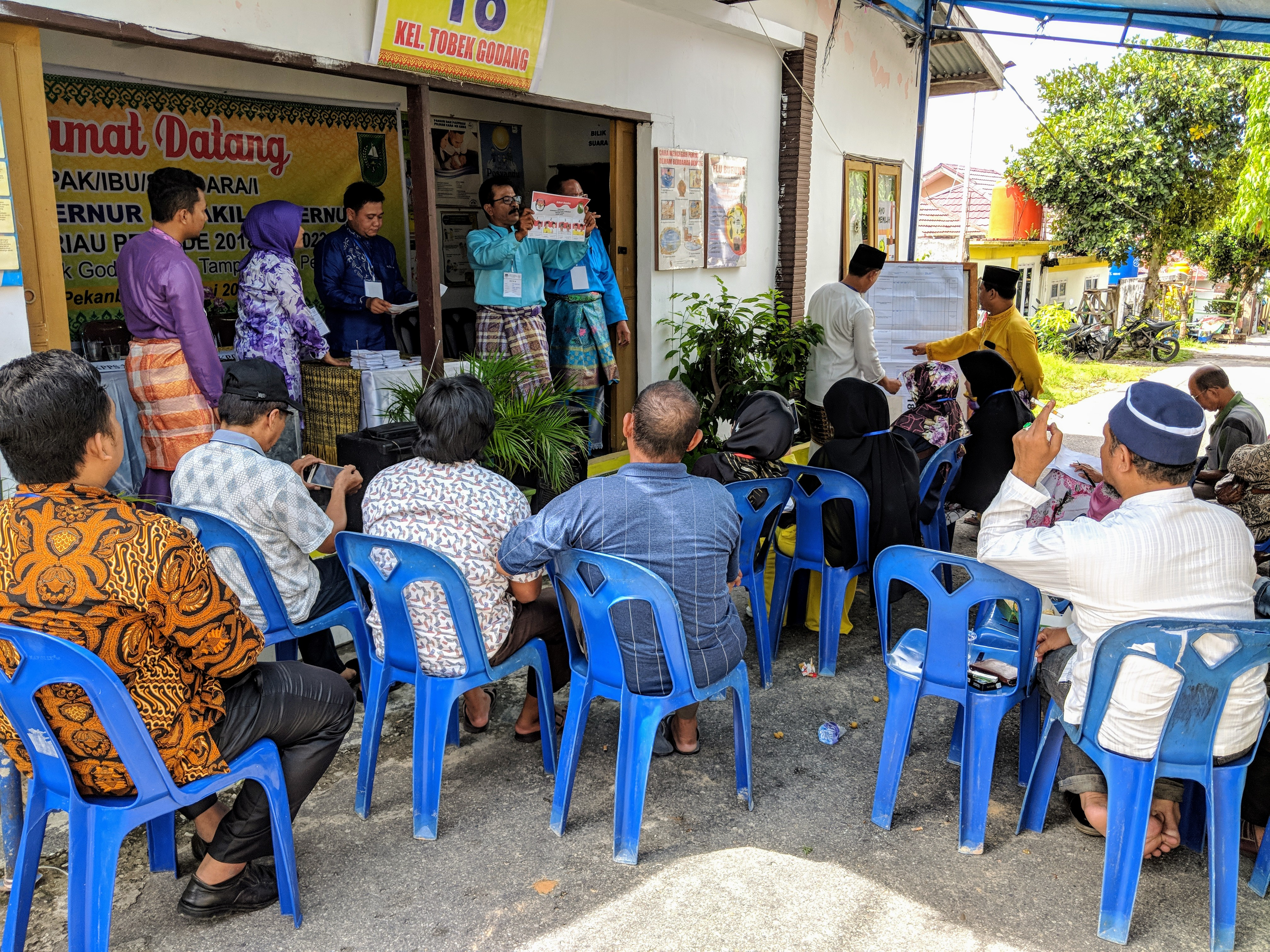
Vote counting at a polling station in Pekanbaru, Riau during election day.
