= Novriwan Jaya =

Indonesian politician (born 1974)

Regent of West Tulang Bawang
- Incumbent
- Assumed office 20 February 2025
- Preceded by: Umar Ahmad

Personal details
- Born: 14 November 1974 (age 51) Kotabumi, Lampung, Indonesia

Novriwan Jaya (born 14 November 1974) is an Indonesian civil servant and politician. He has served as the regent of West Tulang Bawang Regency in Lampung since February 2025, and previously worked in the regency's local government.

== Early life ==
Novriwan Jaya was born on 14 November 1974 in Kotabumi, North Lampung Regency to parents Rustam and Hapipah. He studied in Kotabumi until 1990, when he graduated from middle school and enrolled at a high school in the provincial capital of Bandar Lampung. After receiving his high school diploma in 1993, he studied agricultural science at the University of Lampung, receiving his bachelor's degree in 1998.

== Career ==
After completing his education, Novriwan began to work as a civil servant in 2000, initially as an employee of the Ministry of Forestry. By 2005, he had moved to the municipal government of Tulang Bawang Regency, and later the West Tulang Bawang Regency in 2009 following its separation from Tulang Bawang. He continued to work in the municipal government of West Tulang Bawang, and by January 2021 he had been appointed as regional secretary (the highest-ranking civil servant in the local government). He remained in this post until his resignation in August 2024 to contest the regency election.

Novriwan ran in West Tulang Bawang's 2024 regency election, receiving the endorsements of 11 political parties. Novriwan's candidacy was one of two in Lampung to be single-candidate, and hence he faced the blank box option. Novriwan with his running mate Nadirsyah (younger brother of the previous regent Umar Ahmar) secured 100,557 votes (66.16%) against the blank box option, and were sworn in on 20 February 2025.
