= 2024 Lampung gubernatorial election =

- 27 November 2024
- Turnout: 65.55% (▼5.44pp)
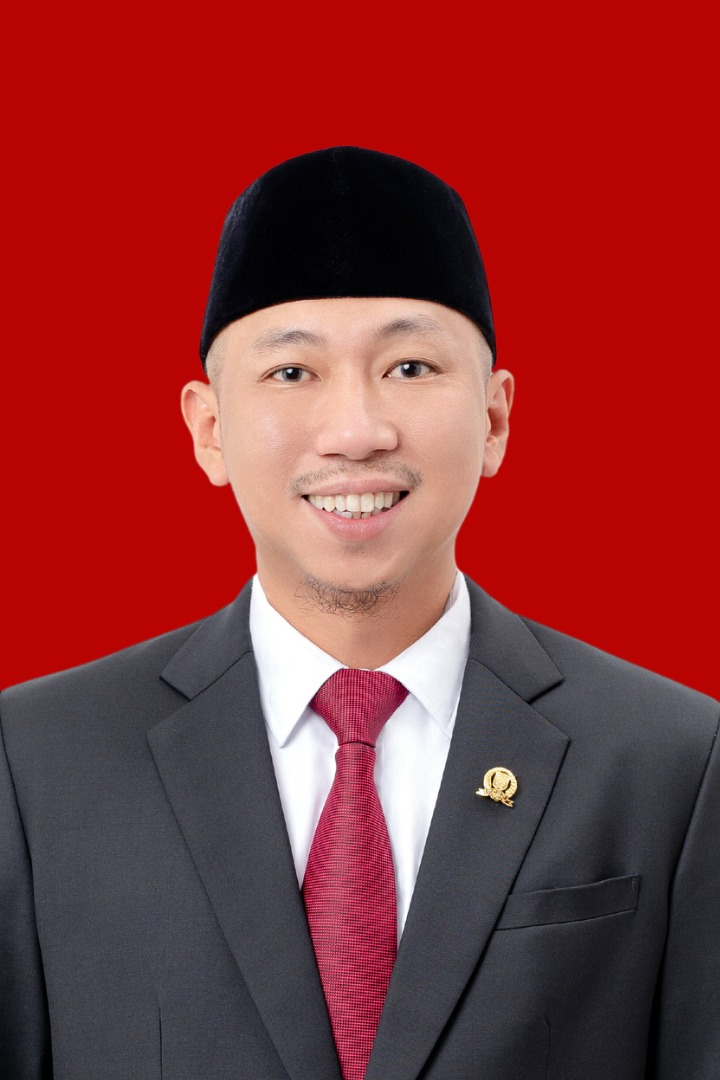

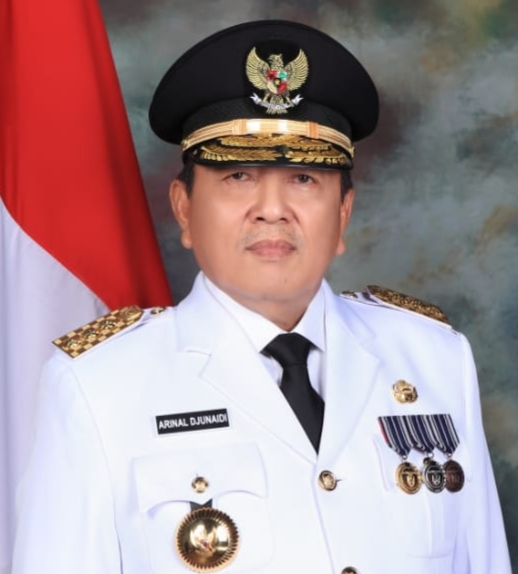
Candidate	Rahmat Mirzani Djausal	Arinal Djunaidi
Party	Gerindra	Golkar (Note: Despite being a member of Golkar, the party instead backed Rahmat. Arinal was nominated by the PDI-P.)
Alliance	KIM Plus	–
Running mate	Jihan Nurlela	Sutono
Popular vote	3,300,681	691,076
Percentage	82.69%	17.31%
- Results map by district
Governor before election
Samsudin (acting)
Independent
Elected Governor
Jihan Nurlela
Gerindra

The 2024 Lampung gubernatorial election was held on 27 November 2024 as part of nationwide local elections to elect the governor and vice governor of Lampung for a five-year term. The previous election was held in 2018. Former member of the Lampung Regional House of Representatives, Rahmat Mirzani Djausal of the Gerindra Party, won the election in a landslide with 82% of the vote. Former Governor Arinal Djunaidi, a member of Golkar who was nominated by the Indonesian Democratic Party of Struggle (PDI-P), received 17%.

== Electoral system ==
The election, like other local elections in 2024, follow the first-past-the-post system where the candidate with the most votes wins the election, even if they do not win a majority. It is possible for a candidate to run uncontested, in which case the candidate is still required to win a majority of votes "against" an "empty box" option. Should the candidate fail to do so, the election will be repeated on a later date.

== Candidates ==
According to electoral regulations, in order to qualify for the election, candidates were required to secure support from a political party or a coalition of parties controlling 17 seats (20 percent of all seats) in the Lampung Regional House of Representatives (DPRD). As no political parties won 17 or more seats in the 2024 legislative election, coalitions are required to nominate a candidate. Candidates may alternatively demonstrate support to run as an independent in form of photocopies of identity cards, which in Lampung's case corresponds to 490,434 copies. One candidate, Ahmad Muslimin, began the registration process with the General Elections Commission (KPU) but did not manage to submit sufficient proofs of support by the set deadline. Muslimin cited the short amount of time provided to submit the large number of documents, along with prohibitive costs.

=== Declared ===
The following candidates qualified to contest the election:

1
Candidate from Golkar and PDI-P
Arinal Djunaidi	Sutono
for Governor	for Vice Governor
Governor of Lampung (2019–2024)	PDI-P Figure
Parties
13 / 85 (15%) PDI-P (13 seats)

2
Candidate from Gerindra and Independent
Rahmad Mirzani Djausal	Jihan Nurlela
for Governor	for Vice Governor
Member of DPRD Lampung Gerindra (2019–2024)	Senator of DPD Lampung (2019–2024)
Parties
72 / 85 (85%) PKB (11 seats); Gerindra (16 seats); Golkar (11 seats); Nasdem (10 seats); PKS (7 seats); PAN (8 seats); Demokrat (9 seats)

=== Potential ===
The following are individuals who have either been publicly mentioned as a potential candidate by a political party in the DPRD, publicly declared their candidacy with press coverage, or considered as a potential candidate by media outlets:

- Hanan A. Rozak (Golkar), member of the House of Representatives and former regent of Tulang Bawang.
- Umar Ahmad (PDI-P), former regent of West Tulang Bawang.

== Political map ==
Following the 2024 Indonesian legislative election, eight political parties are represented in the Lampung DPRD:

Political parties	Seat count
Great Indonesia Movement Party (Gerindra)	16 / 85
Indonesian Democratic Party of Struggle (PDI-P)	13 / 85
Party of Functional Groups (Golkar)	11 / 85
National Awakening Party (PKB)	11 / 85
NasDem Party	10 / 85
Democratic Party (Demokrat)	9 / 85
National Mandate Party (PAN)	8 / 85
Prosperous Justice Party (PKS)	7 / 85

== Results ==
Candidate	Running mate	Party	Votes	%
Rahmat Mirzani Djausal	Jihan Nurlela	Gerindra Party	3,300,681	82.69
Arinal Djunaidi	Sutono	Golkar	691,076	17.31
Total			3,991,757	100.00
Valid votes			3,991,757	93.45
Invalid votes			279,588	6.55
Total votes			4,271,345	100.00
Registered voters/turnout			6,515,869	65.55
Source: KPU Lampung
