= Saply TH =

Indonesian civil servant and politician (1953–2025)

Regent of Mesuji
- In office 28 January 2019 – 22 May 2022
- President: Joko Widodo
- Governor: Muhammad Ridho Ficardo; Arinal Djunaidi
- Lieutenant: Haryati Cendralela (2021-2022)
- Preceded by: Khamamik
- Succeeded by: Sulpakar

Vice Regent of Mesuji
- In office 22 May 2017 – 28 January 2019
- President: Joko Widodo
- Governor: Muhammad Ridho Ficardo
- Regent: Khamamik
- Preceded by: Ismail Ishak (2014-2016)
- Succeeded by: Haryati Cendralela

Personal details
- Born: 7 November 1953 Mesuji, Indonesia
- Died: 20 May 2025 (aged 71) Simpang Mesuji, Mesuji, Lampung, Indonesia

Saply TH (7 November 1953 – 20 May 2025) was an Indonesian civil servant and politician who served as the Regent of Mesuji, Lampung, from 2019 to 2022.

== Early life and education ==
Saply TH was born in Mesuji, Lampung, Indonesia, on 7 November 1953. He grew up in Mesuji and spent his formative years in the region. He began his education at SD Negeri Wiralaga, graduating in 1967. He continued to SMP Negeri Menggala, finishing in 1967, and then attended SMA Negeri Tanjung Karang in Bandar Lampung, where he graduated in 1972.

== Career ==
Saply TH started his career in public service in 1978 as a staff member at the Secretariat of the Regional Government of Lampung Province, a position he held until 1980. He then moved to the Mesuji subdistrict office, serving as a staff member from 1980 to 1986. From 1986 to 1991, Saply led the integrated government service unit in Mesuji subdistrict. He continued his service as the chief of governance in Mesuji from 1991 to 1996. Afterward, he became the secretary of Mesuji subdistrict, a role he held from 1996 to 2001. Between 2001 and 2004, Saply was the chief of community empowerment in Mesuji subdistrict. He then served as chief of village empowerment from 2004 to 2008. In 2008, he returned as secretary of Mesuji subdistrict, remaining in that position until his retirement from civil service in 2009.

After retiring from the civil service, Saply TH entered politics. In 2016, he ran for the position of deputy regent of Mesuji and was elected for the 2017–2020. During his tenure, he worked to continue the development of the region and support local communities. A violent clash between the Mekar Jaya Abadi and Pematang Panggang Mesuji Raya residents occurred during his acting tenure, which he promptly handed over to the police.

On 28 January 2019, following the removal of the previous regent due to a corruption case, Saply was appointed regent of Mesuji in an acting capacity. During his acting tenure, Saply delivered the 2018 Accountability Report during the council session and reshuffled key positions in the regional government.

He officially assumed office as the permanent regent of Mesuji on 4 February 2020, serving for the remainder of the previous regent's term. During his leadership, he focused on improving public services and infrastructure in Mesuji. The COVID-19 pandemic occurred during his term, which was responded with preventive action by the government, such as distributing free masks. On 5 January 2021, Haryati Candralela was appointed deputy regent, serving alongside Saply for the remainder of his term. Saply conducted another major key government appointment early into his tenure as permanent regent, which he claimed to be free of bribery and extortion. He was then appointed the chairman of Mesuji's Red Cross Society, serving until 2025.

== Death ==
Saply TH died at his home in Simpang Mesuji, on 20 May 2025, at the age of 71. His death was met with condolences from the Mesuji Regency Government and the wider community.
