= Rahmat Mirzani Djausal =

Indonesian businessman and politician

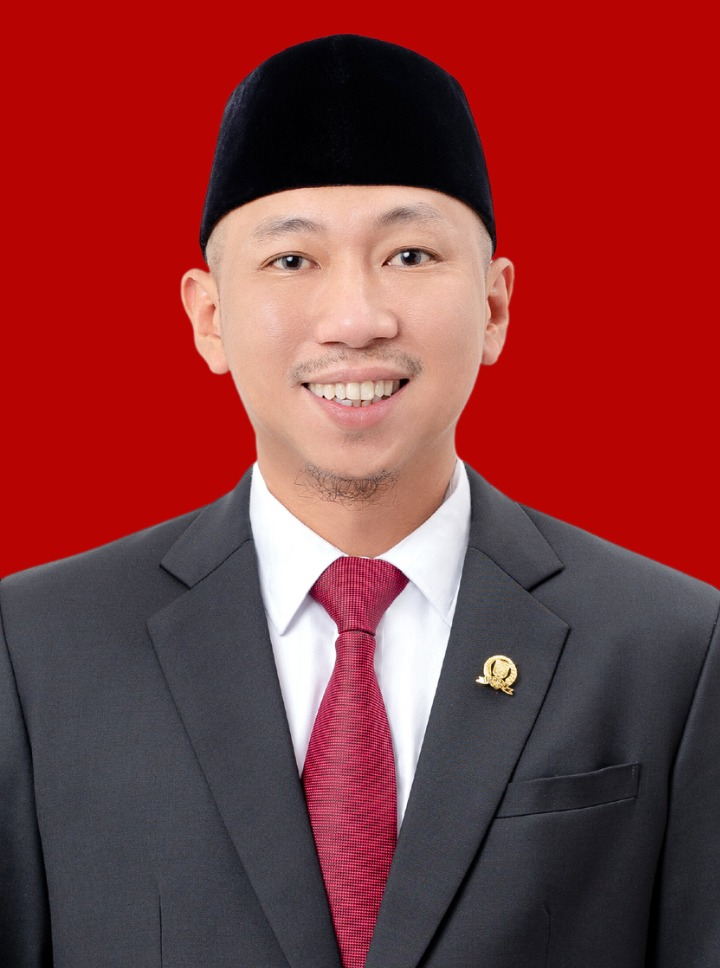

Governor of Lampung
- Incumbent
- Assumed office 20 February 2025
- Preceded by: Samsudin (act.); Arinal Djunaidi

Member of Lampung Regional House of Representatives
- In office 2 September 2019 – 2 September 2024

Personal details
- Born: 18 March 1980 (age 46) Kotabumi, Lampung, Indonesia
- Party: Gerindra
- Other political affiliations: KIM Plus (2024–present)

Rahmat Mirzani Djausal (born 18 March 1980) is an Indonesian businessman and politician of the Gerindra Party who is the governor of Lampung, taking office in February 2025. He had previously served one term between 2019 and 2024 in the Lampung Regional House of Representatives.

== Early life and education ==
Rahmat Mirzani Djausal was born on 18 March 1980 in Kotabumi, North Lampung. Rahmat is the son of Faisol Djausal, a Lampung-based construction businessman. He completed middle school in Kotabumi, and then high school in Tanjung Karang. He then studied civil engineering at Trisakti University in Jakarta, graduating in 2005. He would later obtain a master's in management from Lampung University in 2012.

== Political career ==
After graduating from Trisakti, Djausal worked at his father's company.

By 2018, he had joined Gerindra, becoming the party's campaign leader in Bandar Lampung. He had also been chairman of the provincial branches of Indonesian Young Entrepreneurs' Association and the Indonesian Farmer's Union. He ran for a seat in the Lampung Regional House of Representatives in the 2019 legislative election and won a seat after securing 14,418 votes. In 2022, he became chairman of Gerindra's Lampung branch. He was reelected for a second term in 2024, but did not take office as he ran in the gubernatorial election that year.

In the 2024 gubernatorial election, Djausal ran against incumbent governor Arinal Djunaidi, with senator Jihan Nurlela as running mate. The pair won with 3,300,681 votes (82.7%) and secured the most votes in all 15 regencies and cities within the province.

== Personal life ==
He is married to Purnama Wulan Sari, and the couple has three children. Between 2012 and 2022, he chaired the All-Indonesian Baseball and Softball Association's Lampung branch.
