= 2014 Lampung gubernatorial election =

← 2008	9 April 2014	2018 →
- Turnout: 75.6%
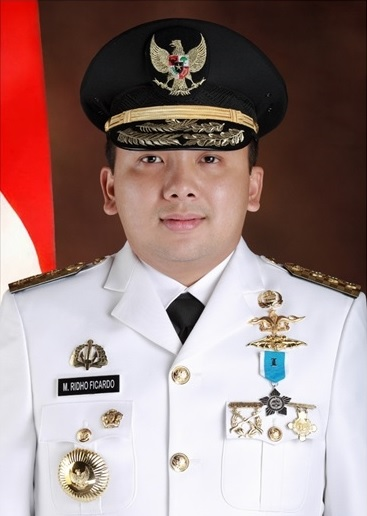

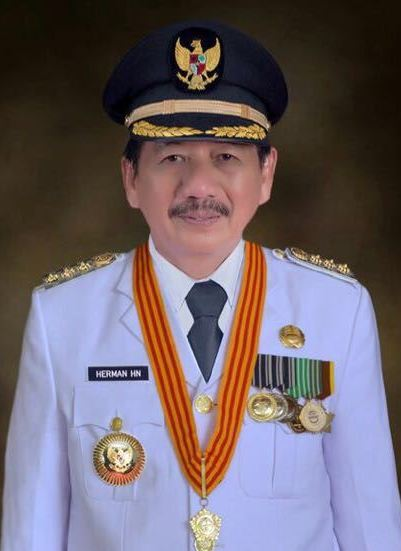
Candidate	Muhammad Ridho Ficardo	Herman Hasanusi
Party	Demokrat	PAN
Running mate	Bachtiar Basri	Zainudin
Popular vote	1,816,533	1,342,763
Percentage	44.8%	33.1%

The 2014 Lampung gubernatorial election took part on 9 April 2014, simultaneous with national legislative elections in Indonesia. It was the second direct election for Lampung's governor. Four pairs of candidates contested the election, with Muhammad Ridho Ficardo winning a plurality of the votes.

== Timeline ==
The gubernatorial election was initially planned to be held on 2 October 2013. However, due to regional finances, this was deemed impossible and thus the election date was delayed to 9 April 2014, coinciding with national legislative elections. The Lampung provincial government had also offered January 2014 and early 2015 as potential election dates, but these were rejected. The gubernatorial election and legislative elections were held at the same location, with voters receiving five ballots (four for legislative candidates and one for the gubernatorial election), and the provincial government continued to fund the gubernatorial ballot boxes.

== Candidates ==
Four pairs of candidates contested the election. A fifth independent pair had registered to run in the election, but withdrew citing distrust in the provincial General Elections Commission due to the delay in the election date. Incumbent governor Sjachroedin Zainal Pagaralam was ineligible to run in the election, having served two terms.

== Results ==
Results of the 2014 Lampung gubernatorial election
Candidate	Running mate	Party	Votes	%
Muhammad Ridho Ficardo	Bachtiar Basri	Demokrat	1,816,533	44.8%
Herman Hasanusi	Zainudin Hasan	PAN	1,342,763	33.1%
Berlian Tihang	Mukhlis Basri	PDI-P	606,566	15.0%
Alzier Dianis Thabranie	Lukman Hakim	Golkar	288,272	7.1%
Total valid votes			4,054,134	100%
Invalid votes			408,154	
Turnout			4,462,288	75.6%
Registered voters			5,899,542	

Ficardo and Bachtiar were sworn into office on 2 June 2014.
