= Herman Hasanusi =

Indonesian politician (born 1956)

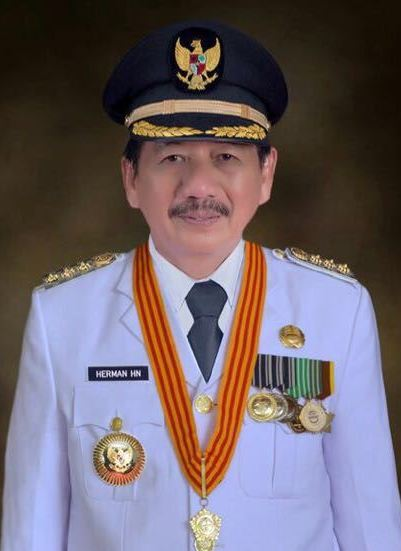

10th Mayor of Bandar Lampung
- In office 17 February 2016 – 17 February 2021
- President: Susilo Bambang Yudhoyono; Joko Widodo
- Governor: Sjachroedin Zainal Pagaralam; Muhammad Ridho Ficardo
- Preceded by: Tobroni Harun
- Succeeded by: Eva Dwiana
- In office 15 September 2010 – 15 September 2015
- Preceded by: Eddy Sutrisno
- Succeeded by: Tobroni Harun

Personal details
- Born: 17 May 1956 (age 70) Tulang Bawang, Lampung, Indonesia
- Education: Bandar Lampung University

Herman Hasanusi (born 17 May 1956) is an Indonesian politician who was the mayor of Bandar Lampung, the third most populated city in Sumatra and the capital of Lampung province. He was first elected in 2010 and was re-elected in 2015, serving until 2021.

== Personal life ==
He was born in the Pagar Dewa subdistrict of Tulang Bawang from parents Hasanusi and Ratu Pesayan. After finishing elementary school, his family moved to Bandar Lampung where Hasanusi continued his studies. His most recent degree was a masters in Management from Bandar Lampung University.

He married Eva Dwiana and the couple has 4 children.

== Career ==
He started his work as a civil servant in 1977 until 2010, serving in various finance-related positions including the head of the investment board, finance bureau and the department of regional incomes.

=== As mayor ===
In 2010, he ran as a mayoral candidate and was elected with 33 percent of the votes in the 6-candidate race. His programs included providing free healthcare and education to the city's inhabitants. He was reelected in the 2015 elections with a landslide victory, gaining 358,254 votes (86.66%). His second term ran from 16 February 2016 to 16 February 2021. He was succeeded as mayor by his wife Eva Dwiana.

In 2014, he participated in Lampung's gubernatorial election, and won 1,342,763 votes (33.12%), placing second behind Muhammad Ridho Ficardo. He once more participated in the 2018 gubernatorial elections for the province, where among other candidates he ran against Ficardo. He again placed second, this time with Arinal Djunaidi being elected governor while Ficardo placed third.

During his time as mayor, he was a member of PDI-P, but he moved to the NasDem Party in 2021, citing a "lack of opportunities" in PDI-P.
