= 2018 Lampung gubernatorial election =

Local election in Indonesia

- 27 June 2018
- Turnout: 71%
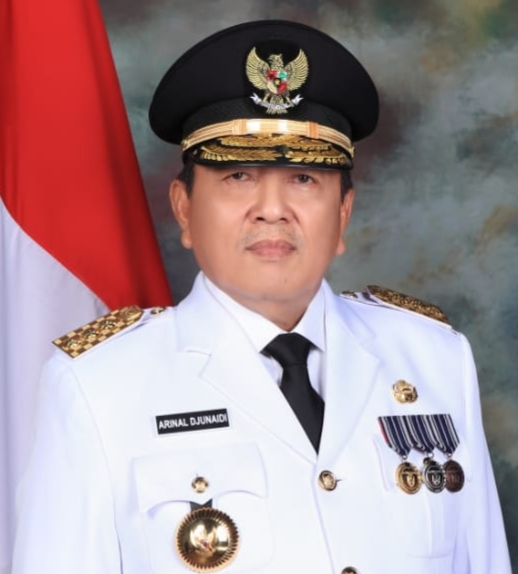

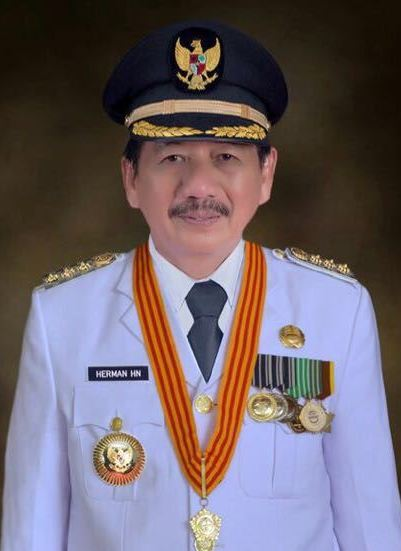

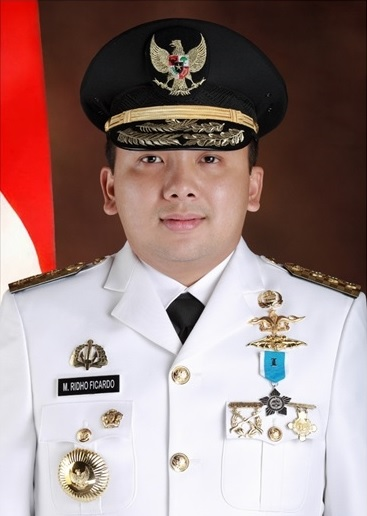

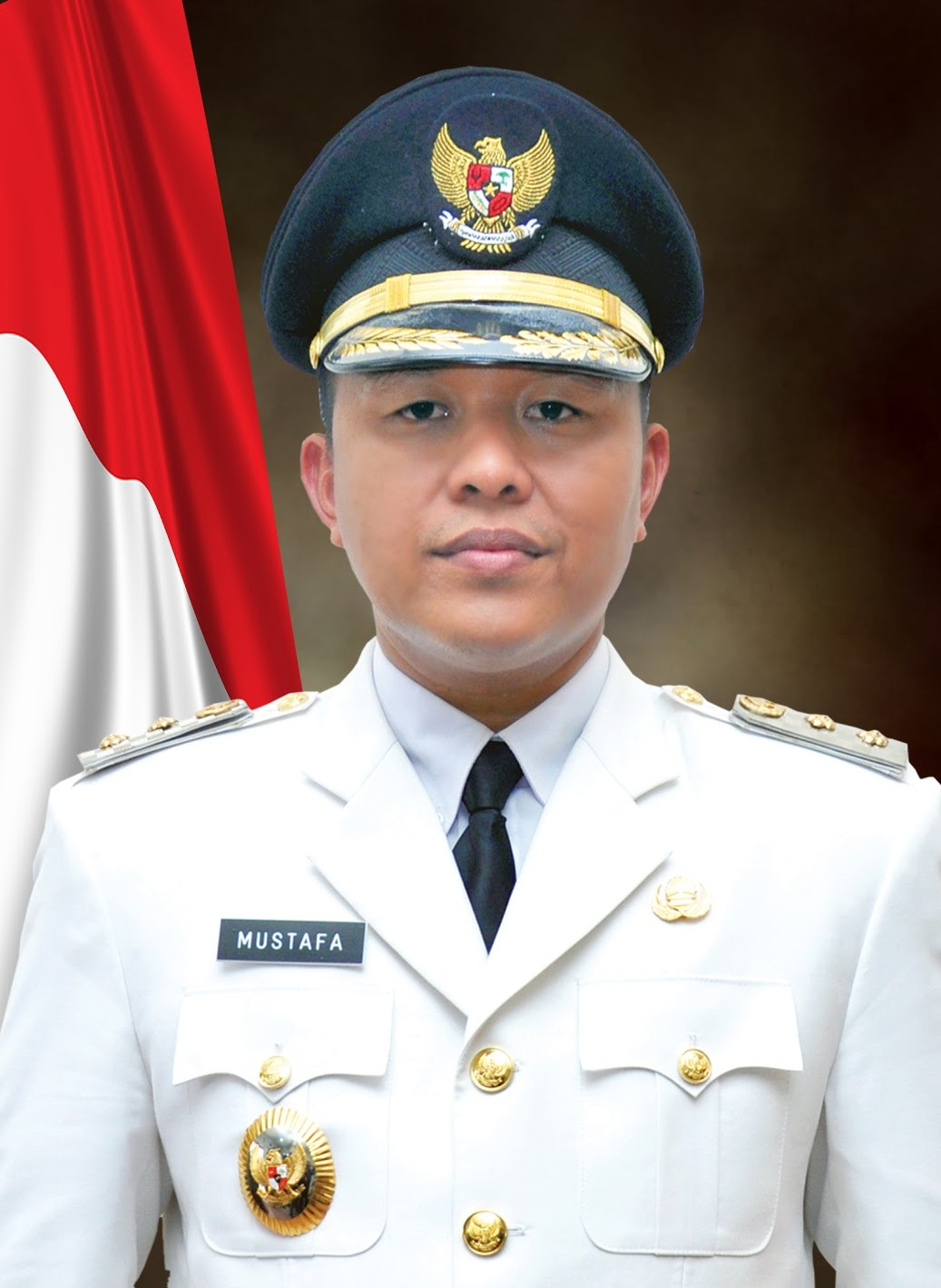
Nominee	Arinal Djunaidi	Herman Hasanusi
Party	Golkar	PDI-P
Running mate	Chusnunia Chalim	Sutono
Popular vote	1,548,506	1,054,646
Percentage	37.78%	25.73%
Nominee	Muhammad Ridho Ficardo	Mustafa
Party	Demokrat	NasDem
Running mate	Bachtiar Basri	Ahmad Jajuli
Popular vote	1,043,666	452,454
Percentage	25.46%	11.04%
- Results map by city and regency
Governor before election
Muhammad Ridho Ficardo
Demokrat
Elected Governor
Arinal Djunaidi
Golkar

The 2018 Lampung gubernatorial election took place on 27 June 2018 as part of the simultaneous local elections in Indonesia. It was held to elect the governor of Lampung along with their deputy, whilst members of the provincial council (Dewan Perwakilan Rakyat Daerah) will be re-elected in 2019.

Candidates included incumbent governor Muhammad Ridho Ficardo who ran for his second term, Bandar Lampung mayor Herman Hasanusi, Central Lampung regent Mustafa and provincial secretary Arinal Djunaidi.

== Timeline ==
Registration for party-backed candidates were opened between 8 and 10 January 2018, while independent candidates were required to register between 22 and 26 November 2017. The numerical order of the candidates were determined on 13 February through a lottery. The campaigning period would commence between 15 February and 24 June, with a three-day election silence before voting on 27 June.

No independent candidates registered to contest the election. The first debate between the candidates were held on 7 April, although it was not covered by national media except for Radio Republik Indonesia. Three debates were planned to be held between the candidates. On 20 April 2018, the Lampung branch of KPU declared that the province would have 5,768,061 valid voters.

== Candidates ==
Under regulations, candidates are required to secure the support of a political party or a coalition thereof comprising at least 20 percent of the seats (i.e. 17 of 85) in the regional house. Alternatively, independent candidates may run provided they are capable of securing support in form of at least 456,594 photocopied ID cards subject to verification by the local committee although no candidates expressing interest managed to do this.

#	Candidate	Position	Running mate	Parties
1	Muhammad Ridho Ficardo	Incumbent governor of Lampung	Bachtiar Basri	Demokrat; PPP; Gerindra; Total 25 seats
2	Herman Hasanusi	Mayor of Bandar Lampung	Sutono	PDI-P (17 seats)
3	Arinal Djunaidi	Former provincial secretary of Lampung; Head of Golkar in Lampung	Chusnuniah Chalim	Golkar; PKB; PAN; Total 25 seats
4	Mustafa	Regent of Central Lampung	Ahmad Jajuli	Nasdem; PKS; Hanura; Total 18 seats

Incumbent Muhammad Ridho Ficardo, who is also the head of Demokrat's Lampung office received the endorsement of his party to run for his second term on 7 December 2017. While initially planning to run with Bengkulu mayor Helmi Hasan, he switched to running with his current deputy Bachtiar Basri, who is part of PAN, after the registration opened. PPP and Gerindra also declared their support for the ticket.

Bandar Lampung mayor Herman Hasanusi (often referred to as Herman HN) was announced by party chairman Megawati Soekarnoputri as PDI-P's candidate on 4 January 2018, with the provincial secretary Sutono as his running mate. Since PDI-P controls enough seats in the provincial assembly by itself, it was not required to form a coalition with other parties.

Golkar decided to endorse its cadre Arinal Djunaidi, who is also the head of its Lampung office on 21 December 2017. In the declaration, they selected East Lampung regent and PKB member Chusnunia Chalim as his running mate. While he received the formal endorsement of PAN, a significant number of PAN's party members went against party lines to support their own cadre Bachtiar Basri.

Mustafa, the regent of Central Lampung, was endorsed by his party to run in April 2017. He was later supported by PKS, who put forth their cadre and Regional Representative Council member Ahmad Jajuli as his running mate. Hanura also endorsed the ticket. Later on, the Corruption Eradication Commission arrested Mustafa for a bribery case, and he resigned from Nasdem.

== Polls ==
=== After nominations ===
Pollster	Date	Sample size	Results
Charta Politika	6–11 March 2018	800	Ridho (35.1%), Herman (26.3%), Arinal (13.1%), Mustafa (11.3%)
SMRC	3–8 March 2018	820	Ridho (34.9%), Herman (23%), Mustafa (13.6%), Arinal (13.2%)

=== Before nominations ===
Pollster	Date	Sample size	Results
Rakata Institute	1–5 August 2017	600	Mustafa (18.63%), Ridho (17.33%), Herman (17%), Arinal (13.17%)
