= 2018 Tegal regency election =

- 27 June 2018
- Turnout: 64.7%
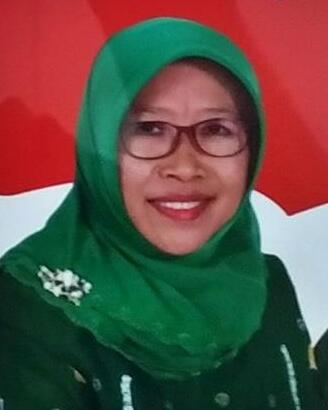

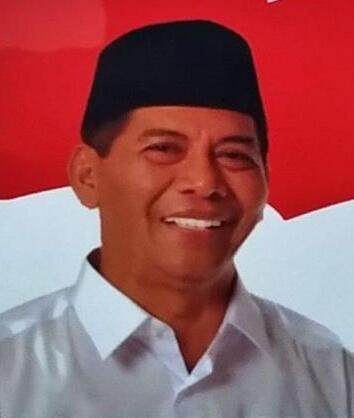

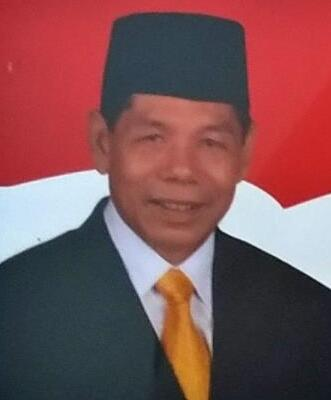
Candidate	Umi Azizah	Haron Bagas Prakosa	Rusbandi
Party	PKB	PDI-P	Golkar
Running mate	Sabilillah Ardie	Drajat Adi Prayitno	Fatchuddin
Popular vote	518,017	148,000	64,155
Percentage	70.94%	20.27%	8.79%
Regent before election
Enthus Susmono
PKB
Elected Regent
Umi Azizah
PKB

The 2018 Tegal regency election was held on 27 June 2018 as part of nationwide local elections to elect the regent of Tegal Regency, Central Java for a five-year term. Incumbent regent Enthus Susmono had unexpectedly died shortly before the election, and his former deputy Umi Azizah defeated two other candidates after securing over 70 percent of votes cast.

== Electoral system ==
The election, like other local elections in 2018, follow the first-past-the-post system where the candidate with the most votes wins the election, even if they do not win a majority. It is possible for a candidate to run uncontested, in which case the candidate is still required to win a majority of votes "against" an "empty box" option. Should the candidate fail to do so, the election will be repeated on a later date.

== Candidates ==
The incumbent regent and vice regent, Enthus Susmono and Umi Azizah, had opted to run for a second term with the endorsement of their party the National Awakening Party (PKB). However, Susmono died in the middle of the campaigning period on 14 May 2018 due to a heart attack. On 18 May, PKB announced that Azizah would become their regent candidate replacing Susmono, and on 20 May appointed local politician Sabilillah Ardie to become Azizah's running mate.

Former regional secretary of Tegal, Haron Bagas Prakosa, also contested the election, having taken an early resignation from his civil servant position in October 2017 in order to run. Prakosa was endorsed by the Indonesian Democratic Party of Struggle, Nasdem, and Demokrat, with Drajat Adi Prayitno as running mate. Another ticket, Rusbandi and Fatchuddin, ran with the endorsement of Golkar and PPP.

== Campaign ==
A public debate was held on 13 May 2018, with Susmono still participating as the regent candidate.

== Results ==
Candidate	Running mate	Candidate party	Votes	%
Umi Azizah	Sabilillah Ardie	PKB	518,017	70.94
Haron Bagas Prakosa	Drajat Adi Prayitno	PDI-P	148,000	20.27
Rusbandi	Fatchuddin	Golkar	64,155	8.79
Total			730,172	100.00
Valid votes			730,172	94.84
Invalid/blank votes			39,727	5.16
Total votes			769,899	100.00
Registered voters/turnout			1,189,444	64.73

Azizah was sworn in for her second term on 8 January 2019, after previously having been sworn in as regent for the remainder of her first term on 5 November 2018.
