= Jihan Nurlela =

Indonesian physician and politician (born 1994)

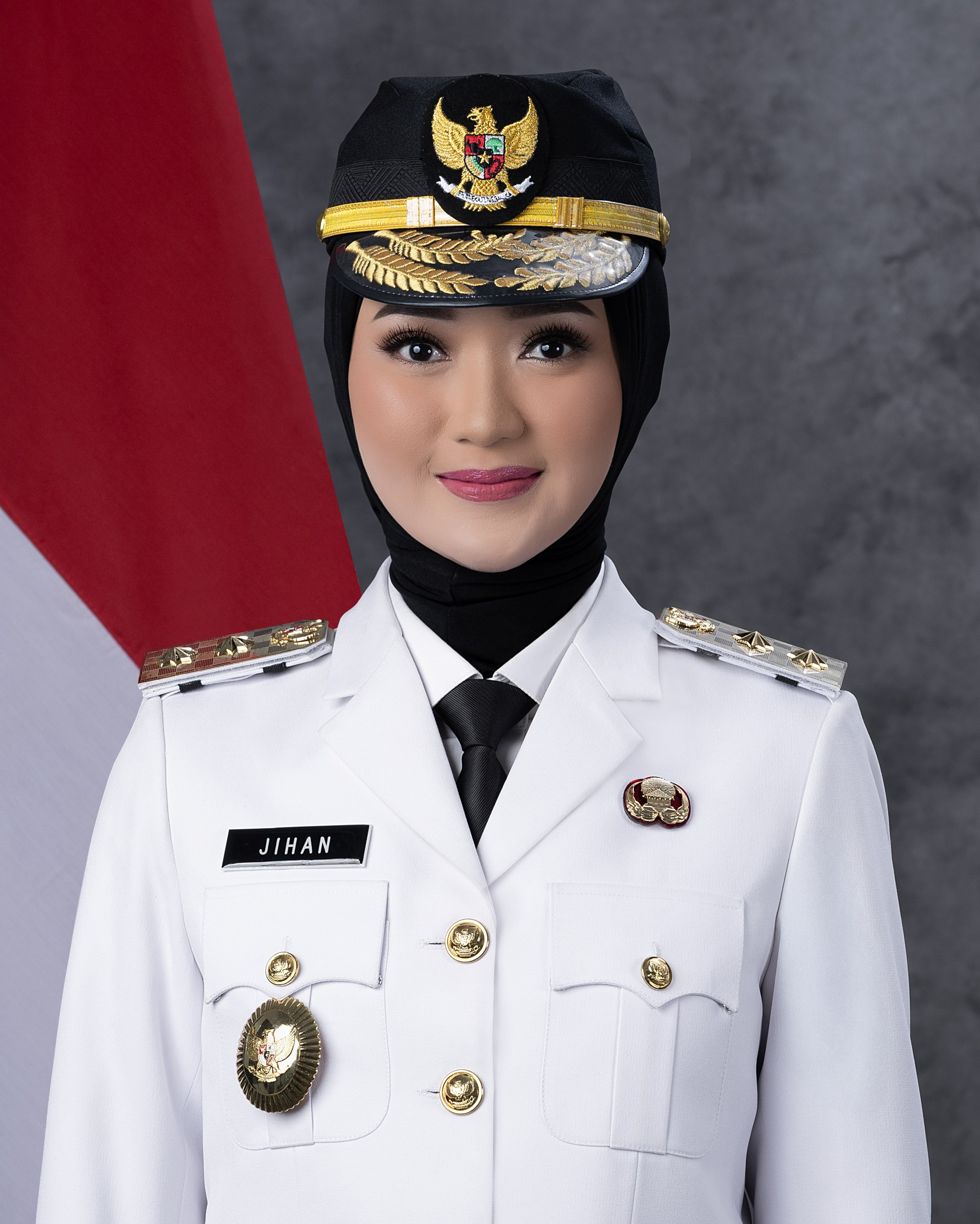
- Official portrat, 2025

Vice Governor of Lampung
- Incumbent
- Assumed office 20 February 2025
- Governor: Rahmat Mirzani Djausal
- Preceded by: Chusnunia Chalim

Senator for Lampung
- In office 1 October 2019 – 24 September 2024

Personal details
- Born: Jihan Nurlela Chalim; 22 April 1994 (age 32) Bojonegoro, east Java, Indonesia
- Spouse: Arya Adi Nugroho (m. 2020)
- Education: Lampung University
- Occupation: Physician and politician

Jihan Nurlela Chalim (born 22 April 1994) is an Indonesian politician who is the vice governor of Lampung since 20 February 2025. She had previously served as a member of the House of Representatives (DPR) for the Lampung Province from 2019 to 2024.

== Education ==
Jihan Nurlela obtained her early education at the Islamic Boarding School of Futuhiyyah Islamic Boarding School Mranggen in Demak, and Al-Ishom Gleget Islamic Boarding School in Jepara. After this, she had also graduated with a medical degree from the Lampung University.

== Career ==
Jihan Nurlela began her career as a doctor amid graduating from university. During the province's electoral period for DPR, she won with a total of 810,373 votes. Since 1 October 2019, she would be among the province's elected representative member to the DPR. Despite this being her first political election, she managed to secure a senatorial seat for Lampung. According to her, the regions of East and Central Lampung provided the majority of the support. She claims there is a higher chance of duplication data when additional support requirements are collected.

== Personal life ==
Jihan Nurlela was born in Sumberrejo village, Jepara Regency on 22 April 1994. She has two siblings: Sasa Chalim, a current student at Lampung University's Faculty of Medicine, and Chusnunia Chalim, an elder sister who serves as the Deputy Governor of Lampung. She stated that her father is a farmer, and live in a family that is involved in politics.

On 20 February 2020, Jihan Nurlela exchanged vows in front of the Kaaba at the Masjid al-Haram in Makkah. She is wed to Arya Ady Nugroho, a physician as well.
