= Way Kanan Regency =

Regency in Lampung, Indonesia

Way Kanan Regency Kabupaten Way Kanan
- Regency
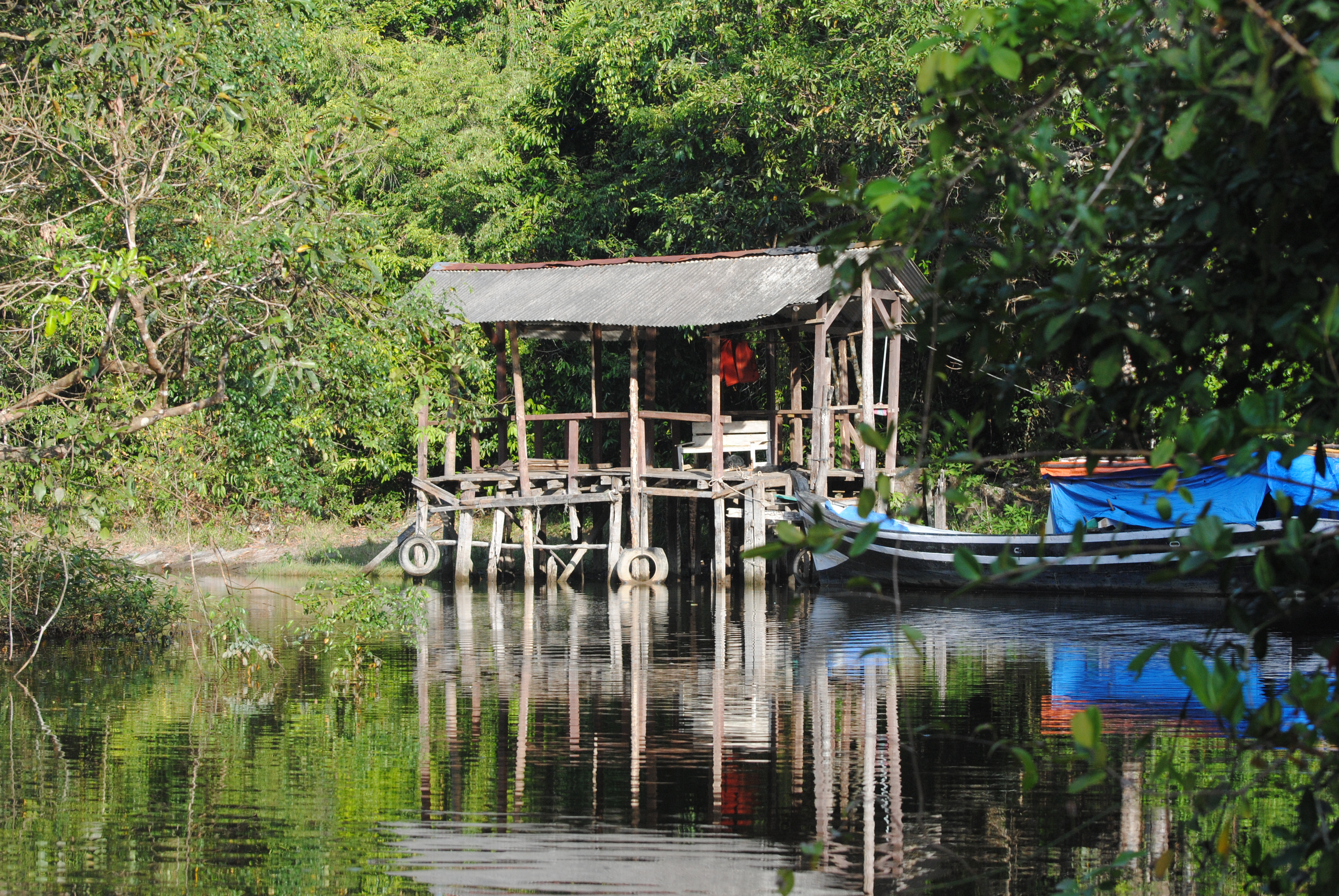
- Way Kanan River Camp

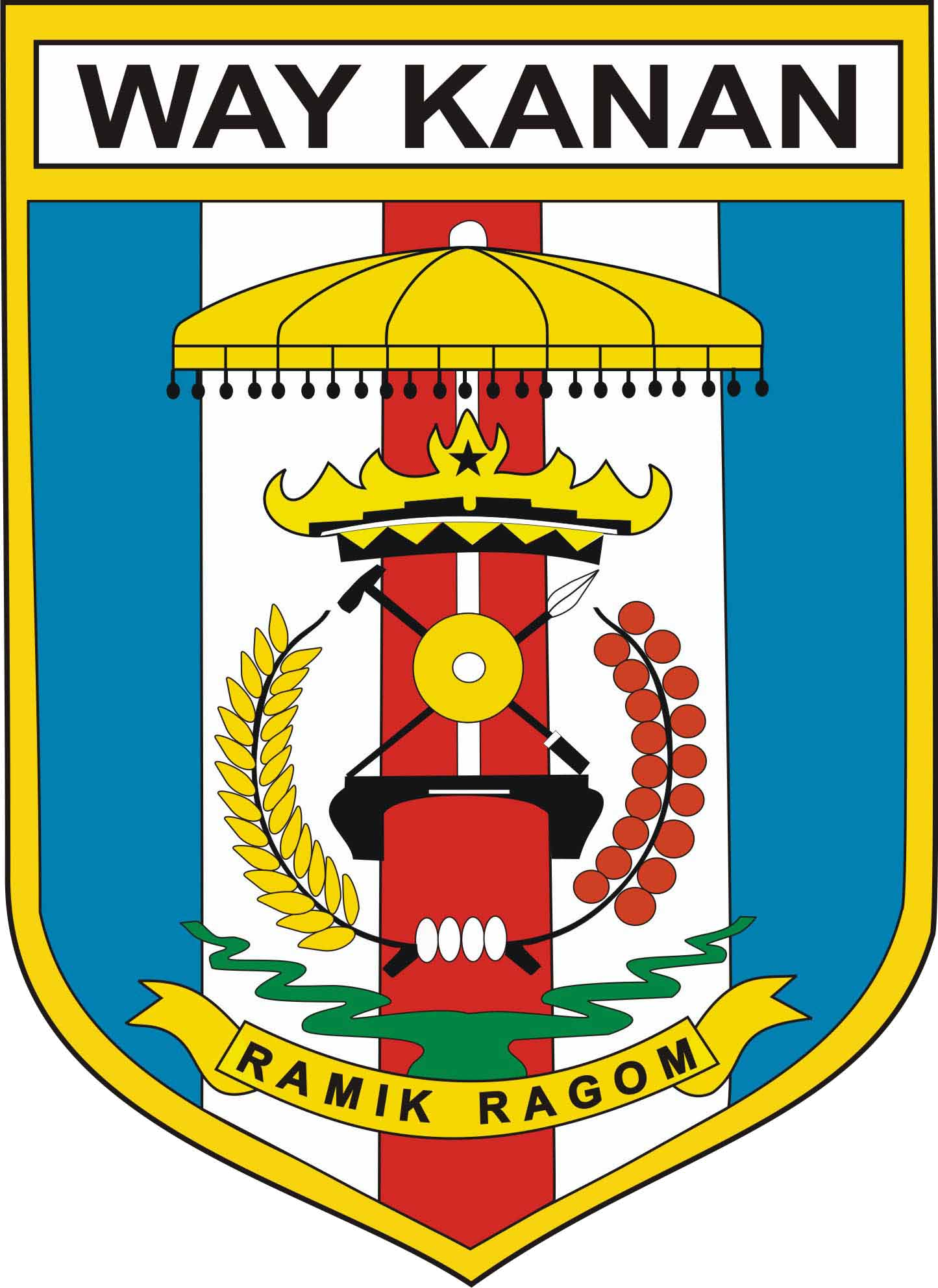
- Coat of arms
- Motto: Ramik Ragom (Many and various)
- Location within Lampung

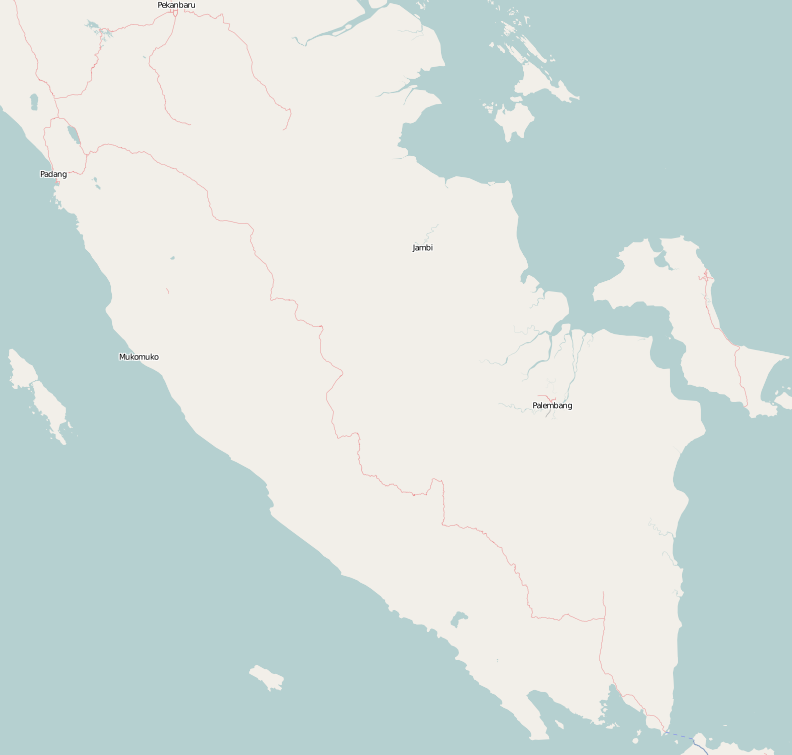
- Location in Southern Sumatra, Sumatra and Indonesia Way Kanan Regency (Sumatra) Way Kanan Regency (Indonesia)
- Coordinates: 4.4470°S 104.5275°E
- Country: Indonesia
- Province: Lampung
- Regency seat: Blambangan Umpu

Government
  - Regent: Ayu Asalasiyah
  - Vice Regent: Vacant

Area
  - Total: 3,522.54 km^{2} (1,360.06 sq mi)

Population (mid 2025 estimate)
  - Total: 499,564
  - Density: 141.819/km^{2} (367.310/sq mi)
- Time zone: UTC+7 (IWST)
- Area code: (+62) 723
- Website: waykanankab.go.id

Way Kanan Regency is a landlocked regency (kabupaten) of Lampung Province, Sumatra, Indonesia. It was created on 20 April 1999 from what were formerly the northern and northwestern districts of North Lampung. It has an area of 3,522.54 km^{2} and had a population of 406,123 at the 2010 census and 473,575 at the 2020 census; the official estimate as of mid 2025 was 499,564 (comprising 255,385 males and 244,179 females). The administrative centre lies at the town of Blambangan Umpu.

== Administrative districts ==
At the time of the 2010 and 2020 Censuses, the regency was divided into fourteen districts (kecamatan), but subsequently a fifteenth district (Umpu Semenguk) was created from part of the Blambangan Umpu District. All fifteen districts are listed below with their areas and their populations at the 2010 census and the 2020 census, together with the official estimates as of mid 2025. The table also includes the locations of the district administrative centres, the number of administrative villages in each district (totaling 224 rural desa and 8 urban kelurahan), and its post code.

Kode Wilayah	Name of District (kecamatan)	Area in km^{2}	Pop'n 2010 census	Pop'n 2020 census	Pop'n mid 2025 estimate	Admin centre	No. of villages	Post code
18.08.03	Banjit	381.25	42,270	45,945	48,789	Pasar Banjit	20 ^{(a)}	34766
18.08.04	Baradatu	120.07	37,757	43,787	46,264	Tiuh Balak Pasar	27 ^{(b)}	34761
18.08.10	Gunung Labuhan	139.73	26,906	31,044	32,209	Gunung Labuhan	21	34768
18.08.02	Kasui	125.02	29,775	32,289	34,069	Jaya Tinggi	19 ^{(c)}	34765
18.08.09	Rebang Tangkas	161.08	19,719	24,410	24,463	Gunung Sari	10	34771
18.08.01	Blambangan Umpu	490.36	54,698	69,218	39,021	Blambangan Umpu	13 ^{(d)}	34764
18.08.08	Way Tuba	213.92	20,400	25,274	27,488	Way Tuba	13	34772
18.08.07	Negeri Agung	232.19	32,572	38,253	38,363	Negeri Agung	19	34773
18.08.15	Umpu Semenguk	208.26	^{(e)}	^{(e)}	34,653	Negeri Baru	13	34764
18.08.05	Bahuga	110.68	9,631	11,422	12,708	Mesir Ilir	11	34763
18.08.13	Buay Bahuga	75.07	19,008	21,016	22,286	Bumi Harjo	9	34767
18.08.14	Bumi Agung	150.33	23,445	27,881	29,891	Bumi Agung	10	34760
18.08.06	Pakuan Ratu	567.37	37,188	44,709	47,140	Pakuan Ratu	19	34762
18.08.11	Negara Batin	292.81	33,616	36,588	40,109	Negara Batin	15	34769
18.08.12	Negeri Besar	254.40	18,138	21,734	22,111	Negeri Besar	13	34774
	Totals	3,522.54	406,123	473,575	499,564	Blambangan Umpu	232	

Note: (a) including the kelurahan of Pasar Banjit.
(b) including 5 kelurahan - Campur Asri, Taman Asri, Tiuh Balak Pasar, Banjar Negara and Mekar Asri.
(c) including the kelurahan of Kasui Pasar. (d) including the kelurahan of Blambangan Umpu.
(e) the 2010 and 2020 populations of the new Umpu Semenguk District are included in the figures for Blambangan Umpu District, from part of which it was created.
