= Chusnunia Chalim =

Indonesian politician

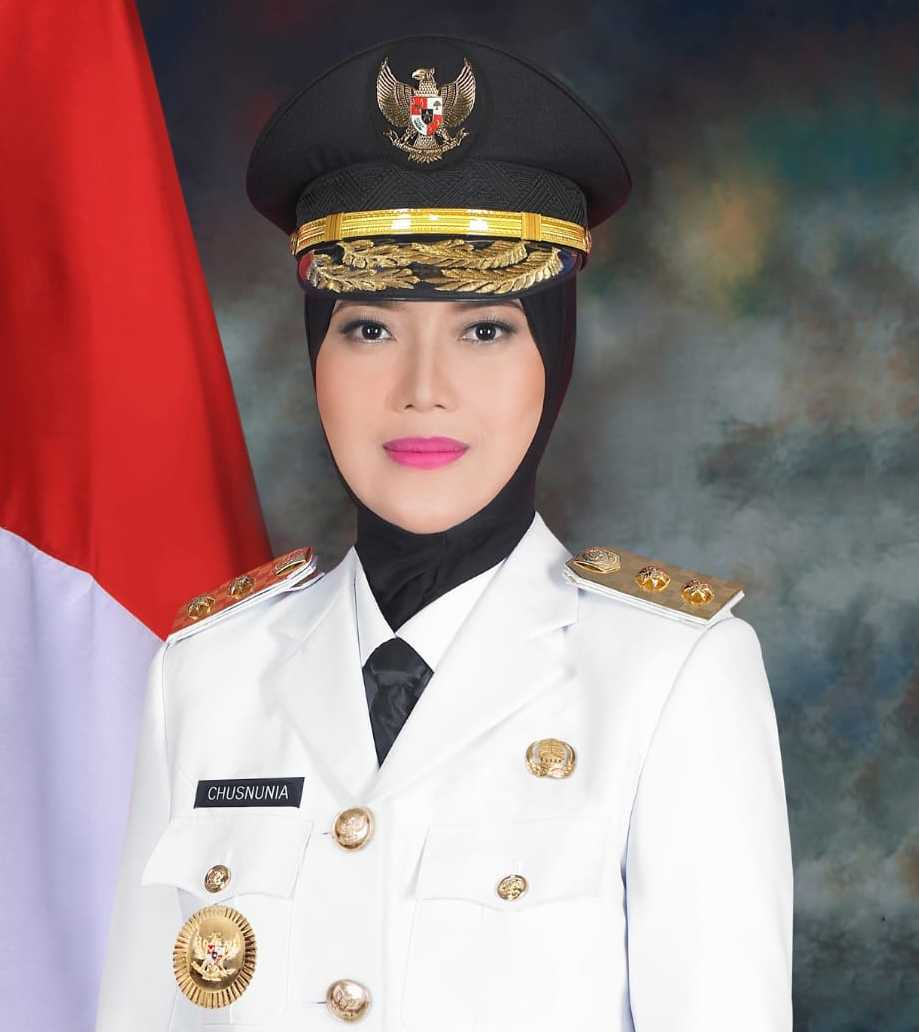

Vice Governor of Lampung
- In office 12 June 2019 – 5 October 2023
- Governor: Arinal Djunaidi
- Preceded by: Bachtiar Basri

Regent of East Lampung
- In office 17 February 2016 – 12 June 2019
- Preceded by: Erwin Arifin
- Succeeded by: Zaiful Bokhari

Personal details
- Born: 12 July 1982 (age 44) Karang Anom, Waway Karya, East Lampung, Indonesia
- Citizenship: Indonesian
- Party: National Awakening Party
- Children: 4
- Education: Universitas Nasional

Chusnunia Chalim (born 12 July 1982) is an Indonesian politician who previously served as vice governor of Lampung from 2019 to 2023. She was the regent of East Lampung Regency, and is the first woman to hold the office. She was also a member of the People's Representative Council's delegation to the ASEAN Inter-Parliamentary Assembly in 2012.

Chalim has promoted the regency as an international tourism destination through its natural beauty. Six elephant calves have been born at Way Kambas National Park during the first two years of her tenure, one of which she named herself. A few months after taking office, she led a festival at the Park which included playing soccer with eggplants and a cracker-eating contest.

Following Lampung's 2018 gubernatorial election, Chalim was elected as vice governor of Lampung, with Arinal Djunaidi becoming governor. They were sworn in on 12 June 2019.
