= Kotabumi =

District in Lampung, Indonesia

- District
- Interactive map of Kotabumi
- Coordinates: 4°48′45.6988″S 104°52′53.7204″E
- Country: Indonesia
- Province: Lampung
- Regency: North Lampung

Area
  - Total: 81.25 km^{2} (31.37 sq mi)

Population (mid 2024)
  - Total: 58,049
  - Density: 714.4/km^{2} (1,850/sq mi)
- Time zone: UTC+7 (Western Indonesia Time)
- Postal Code: 34511 - 34518

Kotabumi is an administrative district (kecamatan) and also the regency seat in North Lampung Regency, Lampung, Indonesia.
