= Arinal Djunaidi =

Indonesian politician

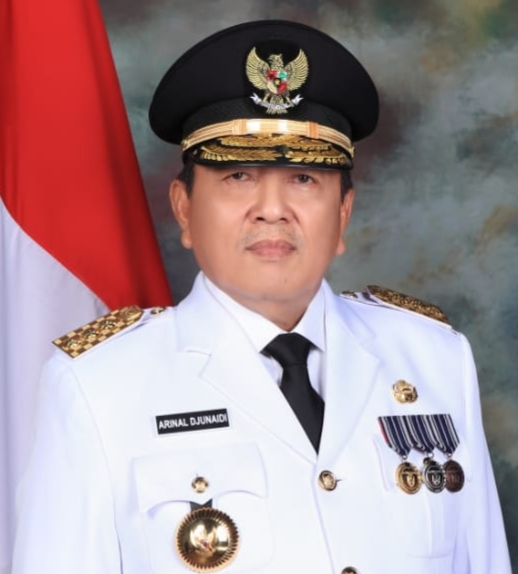

Governor of Lampung
- In office 12 June 2019 – 12 June 2024
- President: Joko Widodo
- Deputy: Chusnunia Chalim
- Preceded by: Muhammad Ridho Ficardo; Boytenjuri (acting)
- Succeeded by: Rahmat Mirzani Djausal; Fahrizal Darminto (acting); Samsudin (acting)

Personal details
- Born: 17 June 1956 (age 70) Bandar Lampung, Lampung, Indonesia
- Party: Golkar
- Spouse: Riana Sari
- Relations: Adi Erlansyah (brother-in-law)
- Children: 3
- Education: Lampung University
- Profession: Politician

Arinal Djunaidi (born 17 June 1956) is an Indonesian politician and former civil servant who served as the Governor of Lampung between 2019 and 2024.

== Early life and education ==
Djunaidi was born in Tanjungkarang, Bandar Lampung on 17 June 1956. He comes from a farming family in Way Kanan Regency. His father came from Negara Batin and his mother came from Negeri Besar. Djunaidi was educated at SD Negeri 17 Kampung Sawah Bandar Lampung (1964–1970), SMP Negeri 2 Bandar Lampung (1970–1971), and Sekolah Pertanian Menengah Atas Tanjung Karang (1971–1975, now SMK PP Negeri Lampung). After completing his first nine years of education, he entered an agriculture trade school and later further studied agriculture at Lampung University which earned him a Bachelor of Agriculture (Ir.) in 1981.

During his college years and after graduation, Djunaidi participated in a number of organisations. He was listed as an administrator of the Lampung University Faculty of Agriculture Student Council (1978–1981), Chairman of the Lampung University Faculty of Agriculture Student Senate (1978–1980), Chairman of the Lampung Muslim Students' Association (1981–1982), Deputy Chairman of the Lampung Indonesian Young Entrepreneurs Association (1982–1984), Commissioner of the Lampung Indonesian National Construction Implementers Association (1983–1985), Deputy Chairman of the Lampung Indonesian National Youth Committee for two terms from 1985 to 1991, and General Secretary of the Lampung Indonesian Engineers Association for two terms from 1995 to 2002.

== Career ==
Djunaidi began his bureaucratic career as Head of the Extension Section of the Agriculture Office of Bandar Lampung Municipality in 1986. Four years later, he was promoted to Head of the Extension Section of the Agriculture Office of Food Crops and Horticulture of Lampung Province. In 1994, he was rotated to become Head of the Agribusiness Development Section of the Lampung Province Food Crops and Horticulture Agriculture Office.

In 1999, Djunaidi was appointed Head of the Metro City Agriculture, Food Crops and Horticulture Office. Three years later, the agency changed its name to the Agriculture Office only. In 2005, he was promoted to Head of the Forestry Service of Lampung Province. From 2010 to 2014, he changed his position at the Regional Secretariat of Lampung Province every year, starting from Development Assistant (2010), Welfare Assistant (2011), Government Assistant (2012), and Welfare Assistant (2013). On 17 July 2014, he was appointed Regional Secretary of Lampung Province by Governor Muhammad Ridho Ficardo. Djunaidi retired as a civil servant and regional secretary on 30 June 2016. After retirement, he became Chairman of the Regional Leadership Council of the Golkar Party in 2017.

During the 2018 gubernatorial elections, Djunaidi ran as a gubernatorial candidate with the support of Golkar, PKB, and PAN with East Lampung regent Chusnunia Chalim as his running mate. The ticket secured 37.78% of the votes in a four-way contest to defeat incumbent Muhammad Ridho Ficardo, and the pair was sworn in on 12 June 2019.

== Controversies ==
In April 2016, Djunaidi threatened a local news reporter when the latter approached him over accusations of Djunaidi having abused a Garuda Indonesia staff, though Djunaidi later apologized for the threats.

In 2023, video criticism made by TikToker and activist, Bima Yudho Saputro, went viral after it criticises the condition of infrastructure within Lampung Province. The video became a public discussion in the community and nationwide, sparking outcries and protest from Indonesian netizens. Public attention has been directed at officials within the Lampung Provincial Government, specifically at Djunaidi. sources stated that Djunaidi had berated Bima's parents, saying that Bima's parents "could not educate a child". However, in a separate statement, Djunaidi denied berating Bima's parents. The criticism prompted President Joko Widodo to conduct an impromptu inspection of several roads in Lampung on 5 May 2023. President Joko Widodo sent a subtle insinuation by saying, "The road (in Lampung Province) is so smooth, Mr. Zulkifli Hasan and I fell asleep." In which, Zulkifli Hasan replied to President Joko Widodo's subtle quip with "Pregnant women can give birth (in the car)". On another occasion in Central Lampung Regency, President Joko Widodo expressed the readiness of the central government to take over the construction of several roads in Lampung Province. Hearing this, Djunaidi happily clapped his hands and expressed his gratitude. Djunaidi's act prompted more criticism by Indonesian Netizens. Furthermore, President Joko Widodo said the central government would "take over" the repair of 15 roads that have been badly damaged for a long time and budgeted "approximately Rp800 billion".

== Honours ==
- Lencana Melati Pramuka
- Satyalancana Pembangunan
- Satyalancana Wira Karya
- Satyalancana Karya Satya (30 Years)
- Satyalancana Karya Satya (20 Years)
- Satyalancana Karya Satya (10 Years)
