= North Lampung Regency =

Regency in Lampung, Indonesia

North Lampung Regency Kabupaten Lampung Utara
- Regency
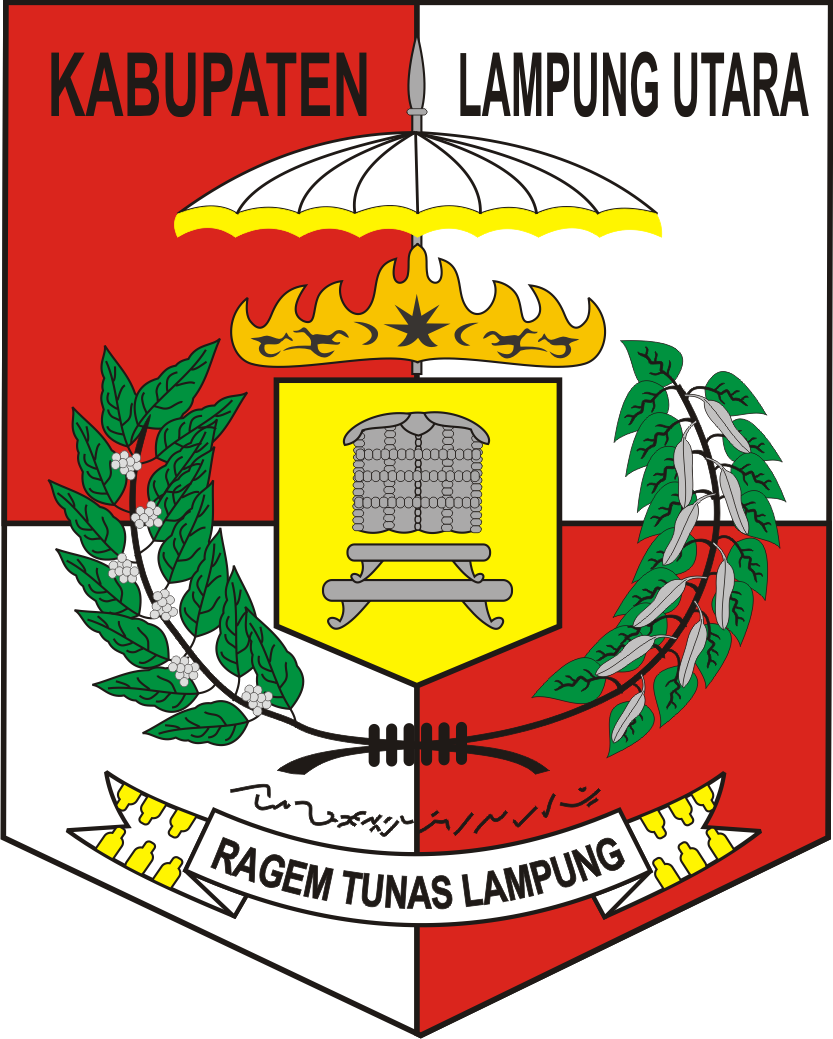
- Coat of arms
- Motto: Ragem Tunas Lampung (Advancement by diversity)
- Location within Lampung

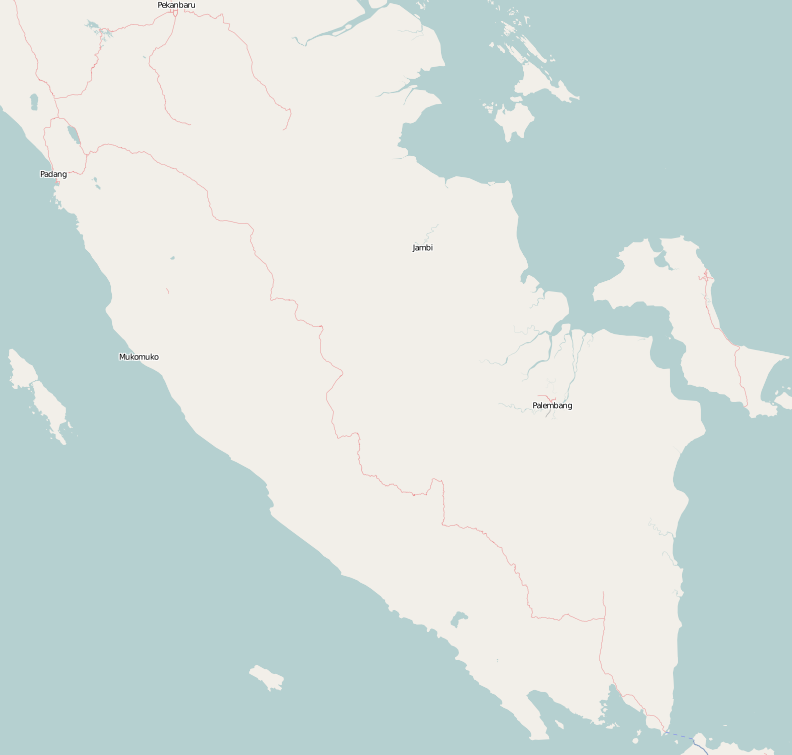
- Location in Southern Sumatra, Sumatra and Indonesia North Lampung Regency (Sumatra) North Lampung Regency (Indonesia)
- Coordinates: 4.8167°S 104.8000°E
- Country: Indonesia
- Province: Lampung
- Regency seat: Kotabumi

Government
  - Regent: Hamartoni Ahadis
  - Vice Regent: Romli

Area
  - Total: 2,667.24 km^{2} (1,029.83 sq mi)

Population (mid 2025 estimate)
  - Total: 686,432
  - Density: 257.357/km^{2} (666.551/sq mi)
- Time zone: UTC+7 (IWST)
- Area code: (+62) 724
- Website: lampungutarakab.go.id

North Lampung Regency (Kabupaten Lampung Utara) is an inland regency (kabupaten) of Lampung Province, Sumatra, in Indonesia. As originally created, it covered a much larger share (over 53%) of the land area of Lampung Province, but on 16 August 1991 its western districts were split off to create a new West Lampung Regency (at that time inclusive of the subsequently-separated West Pesisir Regency); on 3 January 1997 its north-eastern districts were split off to create a new Tulang Bawang Regency (at that time inclusive of the subsequently-separated Mesuji Regency and West Tulang Bawang Regency); and on 20 April 1999 its north-western districts were split off to create a new Way Kanan Regency.

The residual North Lampung Regency has an area of 2,667.24 km^{2} and had a population of 583,925 at the 2010 census and 633,099 at the 2020 census; the official estimate as of mid 2025 was 686,432 (comprising 348,960 males and 337,472 females). The regency seat is the town of Kotabumi.

== Administrative divisions ==
Administratively the regency is divided into twenty-three districts (kecamatan), tabulated below with their areas and their populations at the 2010 census and the 2020 census, together with the official estimates as of mid 2025. For ease of reference, they are grouped below into four geographical sectors, which have no administrative significance. The table also includes the locations of the district administrative centres, the numbers of administrative villages in each district, and its post codes.

| Kode Wilayah | Name of District (kecamatan) | Area in km^{2} | Pop'n 2010 census | Pop'n 2020 census | Pop'n mid 2025 estimate | Admin centre | No. of villages | Post code(s) |
|---|---|---|---|---|---|---|---|---|
| 18.03.01 | Bukit Kemuning | 163.25 | 38,708 | 41,839 | 45,860 | Bukit Kemuning | 8 | 34564 |
| 18.03.12 | Abung Tinggi (Higher Abung) | 56.21 | 16,026 | 17,916 | 19,765 | Ulak Rengas | 8 | 34556 |
| 18.03.04 | Tanjung Raja | 228.20 | 29,880 | 31,953 | 35,068 | Tanjung Raja | 19 | 34557 |
| 18.03.06 | Abung Barat (West Abung) | 89.74 | 18,574 | 20,472 | 22,069 | Ogan Lima | 14 | 34558 |
| 18.03.11 | Abung Tengah (Central Abung) | 78.59 | 15,438 | 17,164 | 18,606 | Gunung Besar | 11 | 34584 |
| 18.03.22 | Abung Kunang | 51.67 | 9,345 | 9,947 | 10,664 | Aji Kagungan | 7 | 34565 |
| 18.03.19 | Abung Pekurun | 162.23 | 11,162 | 12,386 | 13,697 | Pekurun Tengah | 9 | 34582 |
| Sub-totals | Western Sector | 829.89 | 139,133 | 151,677 | 165,729 | | 76 | |
| 18.03.02 | Kotabumi | 81.25 | 51,863 | 54,841 | 58,816 | Kotabumi Ilir | 13 | 34511: 34518 |
| 18.03.09 | Kotabumi Utara (North Kotabumi) | 143.38 | 30,139 | 34,301 | 36,687 | Madukoro | 8 | 34511 |
| 18.03.10 | Kotabumi Selatan (South Kotabumi) | 100.40 | 64,027 | 68,987 | 74,602 | Mulang Maya | 14 | 34511: 34519 |
| Sub-totals | Kotabumi Sector | 325.03 | 146,029 | 158,129 | 170,105 | | 35 | |
| 18.03.07 | Abung Selatan (South Abung) | 110.31 | 46,727 | 52,463 | 56,347 | Kalibalangan | 16 | 34581 |
| 18.03.13 | Abung Semuli | 100.89 | 23,542 | 26,036 | 29,286 | Semuli Jaya | 7 | 34580 |
| 18.03.23 | Blambangan Pagar | 100.72 | 17,295 | 19,336 | 21,022 | Blambangan | 7 | 34586 |
| 18.03.05 | Abung Timur (East Abung) | 192.50 | 33,741 | 36,708 | 40,372 | Bumi Agung Marga | 12 | 34583 |
| 18.03.14 | Abung Surakarta | 72.84 | 27,073 | 28,385 | 30,900 | Tata Karya | 9 | 34585 |
| Sub-totals | Eastern Sector | 577.26 | 147,378 | 162,928 | 177,927 | | 51 | |
| 18.03.03 | Sungkai Selatan (South Sungkai) | 91.38 | 21,164 | 22,721 | 24,718 | Ketapang | 11 | 34554 |
| 18.03.15 | Muara Sungkai | 123.52 | 14,212 | 14,684 | 15,828 | Negeri Ujung Karang | 11 | 34559 |
| 18.03.16 | Bunga Mayang | 209.19 | 31,991 | 33,839 | 35,151 | Negara Tulang Bawang | 11 | 34555 |
| 18.03.21 | Sungkai Barat (West Sungkai) | 74.41 | 11,894 | 11,809 | 13,076 | Sinar Harapan | 10 | 34552 |
| 18.03.20 | Sungkai Jaya (Great Sungkai) | 58.78 | 9,804 | 9,539 | 10,457 | Cempaka | 9 | 34553 |
| 18.03.08 | Sungkai Utara (North Sungkai) | 207.70 | 32,413 | 35,732 | 38,626 | Negara Ratu | 15 | 34563 |
| 18.03.17 | Hulu Sungkai (Upper Sungkai) | 89.91 | 13,756 | 14,979 | 15,645 | Gedung Makripat | 10 | 34561 |
| 18.03.18 | Sungkai Tengah (Central Sungkai) | 80.13 | 15,503 | 17,062 | 19,150 | Batu Nangkop | 8 | 34562 |
| Sub-totals | Northern Sector | 935.02 | 150,737 | 160,365 | 172,662 | | 85 | |
| Totals | for Regency | 2,667.24 | 584,277 | 633,099 | 686,432 | Kotabumi | 247 | |

The districts are sub-divided into 247 villages, comprising 232 rural desa and 15 urban kelurahan - the latter comprising 9 in Kotabumi District (Cempedak, Kota Gapura, Kotabumi Ilir, Kotabumi Pasar, Kotabumi Tengah, Kotabumi Udik, Rejosari, Sindang Sari and Sribasuki), 5 in Kotabumi Selatan District (Kelapa Tujuh, Kota Alam, Tanjung Aman, Tanjung Harapan and Tanjung Senang), and 1 in Bukit Kemuning District (Bukit Kemuning town).

== History ==
North Lampung Regency, which used to be the largest district in Lampung, Based on Law no, 1 of 1945, during the independence of the Republic of Indonesia, North Lampung Regency was the administrative area of the Kewedanan Marga, On December 3, 1952 the system of Marga, 75 Marga and 11 Buay Indeling Residentie Lampung 1:750.000 Derukkrij 1930 was abolished, with the issuance of Resident Presiden No. 153 of 1952. However, after the issuance of Law No. RI. 14 of 1964 concerning the formation of Lampung Province, then North Lampung became part of the Lampung Province (previously North Lampung was part of South Sumatra Province). Due to the expansion of several districts. So that the Low of the Republik of Indonesia Number 18 of 1965 was issued.

Since the formation of North Lampung Regency, three areas have been split off from it to form new regencies during the 1990s. The first was the formation of West Lampung Regency on 16 August 1991, with its administrative capital at Liwa, Indonesia. This formation was based on Law No. 6 of 1991. The second separation of the territory was the establishment of Tulang Bawang Regency on 3 January 1997, which was established based on Law no. 2 of 1997. The third separation was the formation of Way Kanan Regency on 20 April 1999; this creation was based on the Law of the Republik of Indonesia Number 12 of 1999.

== Tourist attractions ==
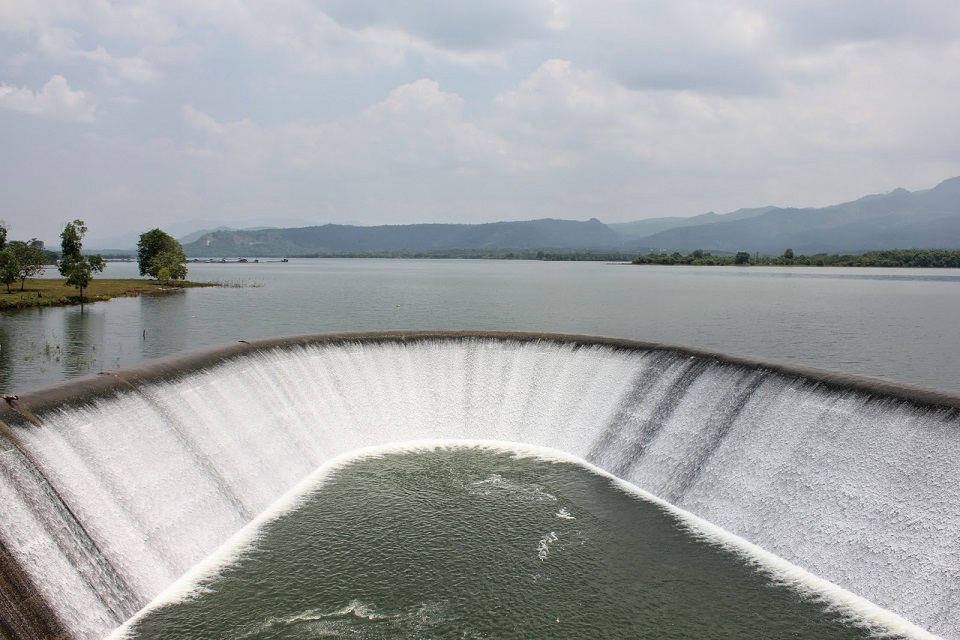
View of Way Rarem Dam

- Curup Selampung Waterfall
- Curup Paten Waterfall
- Tirta Shinta Dam
- Way Rarem Dam
