= West Tulang Bawang Regency =

Regency in Lampung, Indonesia

West Tulang Bawang Regency (Kabupaten Tulang Bawang Barat)
- Regency
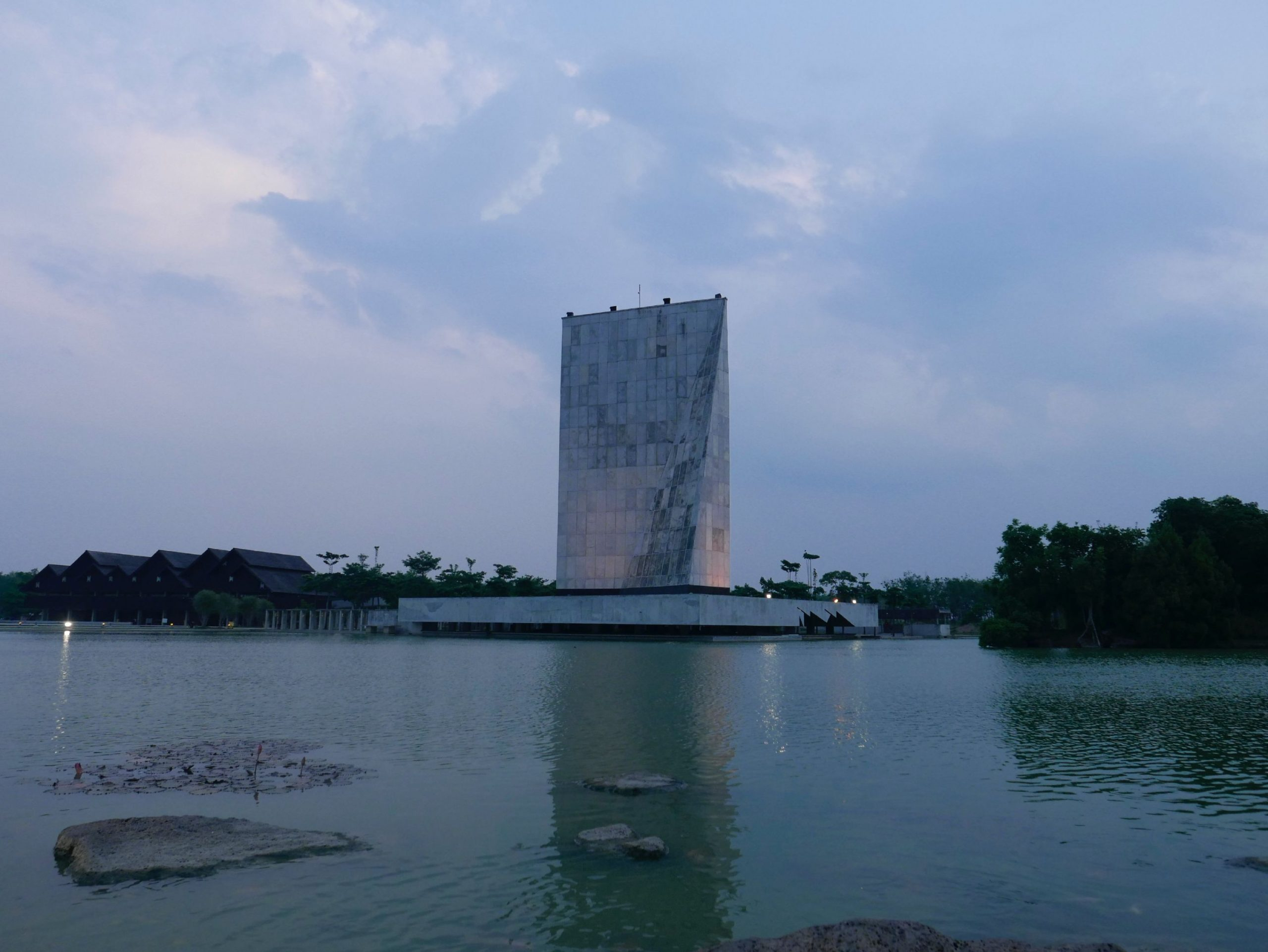
- Tubaba great mosque

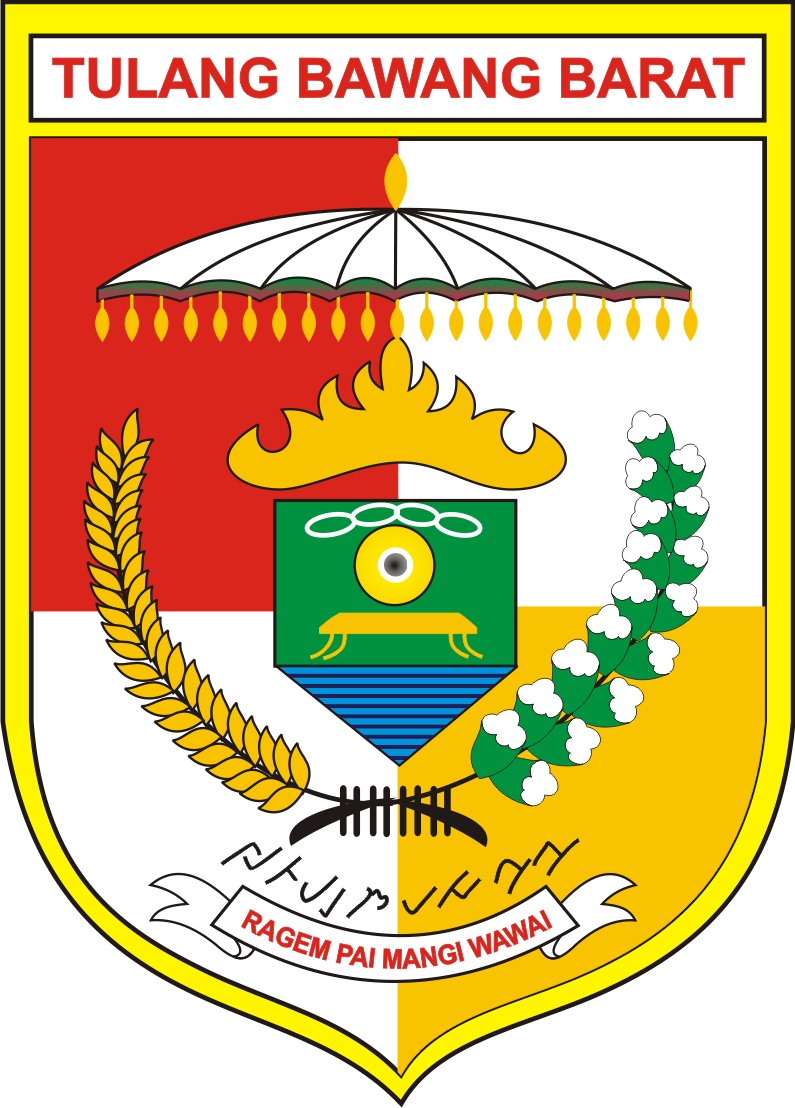
- Coat of arms
- Motto: Ragem Pai Mangi Wawai (Achieve the betterment by consensus)
- Location within Lampung

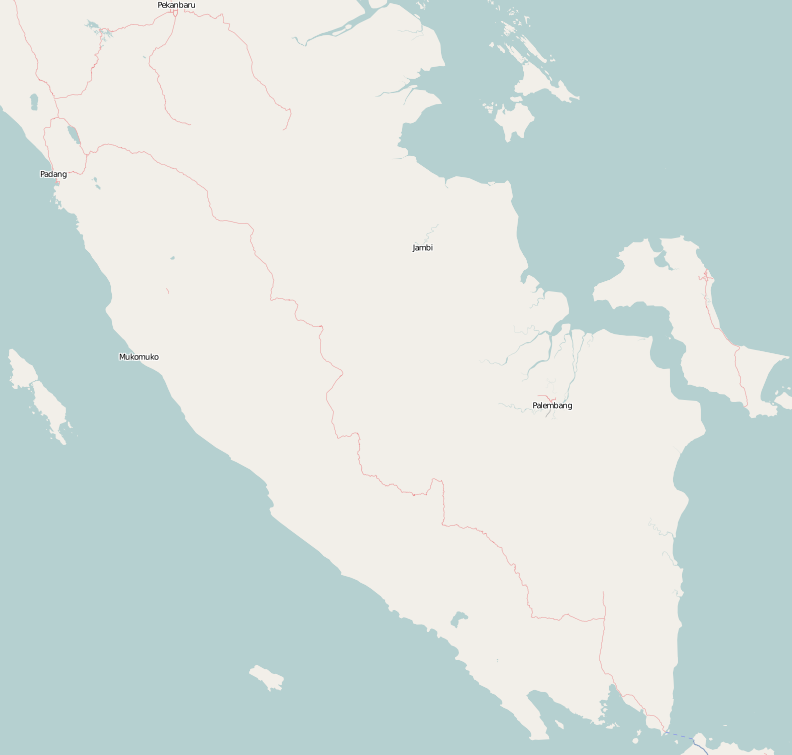
- Location in Southern Sumatra, Sumatra and Indonesia West Tulang Bawang Regency (Sumatra) West Tulang Bawang Regency (Indonesia)
- Coordinates: 4.4398°S 105.0444°E
- Country: Indonesia
- Province: Lampung
- Regency seat: Panaragan Jaya

Government
  - Regent: Novriwan Jaya
  - Vice Regent: Nadirsyah

Area
  - Total: 1,257.09 km^{2} (485.37 sq mi)

Population (end 2025 estimate)
  - Total: 310,790
  - Density: 247.23/km^{2} (640.32/sq mi)
- Time zone: UTC+7 (IWST)
- Area code: (+62) 726
- Website: tulangbawangbaratkab.go.id

West Tulang Bawang Regency (Indonesian: Kabupaten Tulung Bawang Barat) is a regency (kabupaten) of Lampung Province, Sumatra, Indonesia. It was created on 29 October 2008 from what were formerly the western districts of Tulang Bawang Regency. It has a land area of 1,257.09 km^{2} and had a population of 250,707 people at the 2010 Census and 286,162 at the 2020 Census; the official estimate as at end 2025 was 301,790 (comprising 153,445 males and 148,345 females). The regency seat is the town of Panaragan Jaya.

== Administrative districts ==
At the time of the 2010 Census the Regency comprised eight districts (kecamatan), but subsequently a ninth district - Batu Putih - was created from the southwest part of Gunung Terang District. The first three districts listed below lie south of the Tulang Bawang River (although Tulang Bawang Udik District straddles the river in the west), while the other six districts lie north of the river. The districts are listed below with their areas and their populations at the 2010 Census and the 2020 Census, together with the official estimates as at end 2025. The table also includes the locations of the district administrative centres, the number of administrative villages in each district (totalling 93 rural desa and 3 urban kelurahan), and its post code.

Kode Wilayah	Name of District (kecamatan)	Area in km^{2}	Pop'n 2010 Census	Pop'n 2020 Census	Pop'n end 2025 Estimate	Admin centre	No. of villages	Post code
18.12.03	Tulang Bawang Udik	213.70	29,969	33,231	34,545	Karta	9	34791
18.12.02	Tumijajar	113.22	40,547	44,658	46,273	Dayamurni	10 ^{(a)}	34794
18.12.01	Tulang Bawang Tengah (Central Tulang Bawang)	247.47	76,559	86,351	90,509	Panaragan Jaya	19 ^{(b)}	34793
18.12.08	Pagar Dewa	139.29	5,131	6,781	7,153	Pagar Dewa	6	34792
18.12.07	Lambu Kibang	84.82	21,831	23,278	24,804	Kibang Budi Jaya	10	34787
18.12.04	Gunung Terang	72.17	30,228	19,472	20,361	Gunung Terang	10	34784
18.12.09	Batu Putih	100.84	^{(c)}	16,655	18,044	Margo Mulyo	10	34785
18.12.05	Gunung Agung	211.89	28,057	33,079	35,423	Tunas Jaya	13	34783
18.12.06	Way Kenanga	73.69	18,385	22,657	24,278	Balam Jaya	9	34788
	Totals	1,257.09	250,707	286,162	301,790	Panaragan Jaya	96	

Notes: (a) including kelurahan of Sumber Rejo. (b) including the two kelurahan of Panaragan Jaya and Mulyo Asri.
(c) the 2010 population of Batu Putih District was included in the figure for Gunung Terang District, from which it was subsequently cut out.
