= University of Lampung =

University in Indonesia

Lampung University
- Universitas Lampung
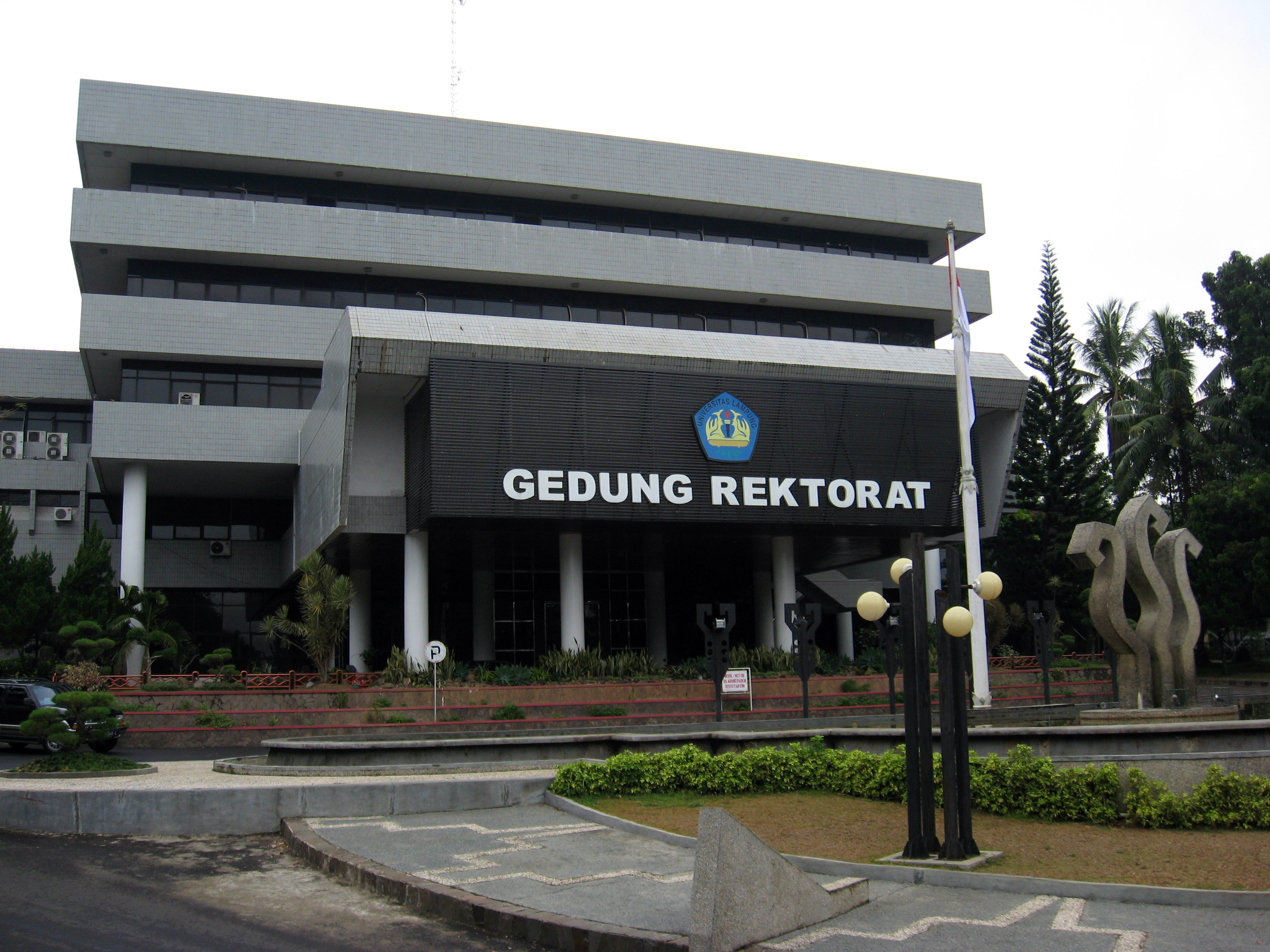
- The rectorate building of Lampung University
- Type: Public
- Established: September 22, 1965
- Affiliations: ASAIHL (Association of Southeast Asian Institutions of Higher Learning)
- Rector: Lusmeilia Afriani
- Location: Prof. Dr. Sumantri Brojonegoro St., Rajabasa, Bandar Lampung, Lampung, Indonesia, Bandar Lampung, Lampung, Indonesia; 5.36451°S 105.24344°E
- Campus: Suburban
- Colours: Green
- Nickname: UNILA
- Website: www.unila.ac.id
- Location in Lampung

University of Lampung (Indonesian: Universitas Lampung) is a public university in Bandar Lampung, Lampung, Indonesia. It was established on September 22, 1965. Its rector is Lusmeilia Afriani, (2023–2027).

== History ==
The college was started because high school graduates in Lampung were going to Java or Palembang to continue their studies. The college was realised by two committees:

- Committee Establishment and Expansion of Secondary School which turned into a Committee Establishment and Expansion of Secondary School and Faculty, chaired by Zainal Abidin Pagar Alam and secretary Tjan Djiit Soe.
- Preparatory Committee for the Establishment of Higher Education Foundation Lampung initiated by Hilman Hadikusuma and Alhusniduki Hamim on 20 August 1959, chaired by Nadirsjah Zaini, M.A. and Hilman Hadikusuma as secretary. The two committees merged into the Foundation Trustees College of Lampung. The foundation was formed with faculties of Economics, Law, and Social.

== Faculties ==
The university has eight faculties in bachelor's degree:

- Faculty of Agriculture
- Faculty of Social and Political Sciences
- Faculty of Economics
- Faculty of Education
- Faculty of Law
- Faculty of Mathematics and Natural Sciences
- Faculty of Medicine
- Faculty of Engineering

== Rector ==
Since May 1973, Lampung University has been led by Chancellors, as follows:

No	Rector	Start	End	Notes
1	Sitanala Arsyad	1973	1981	
2	R. Margono Slamet	1981	1990	
3	Alhusniduki Hamim	1990	1998	
4	Muhajir Utomo	1998	2006	
5	Sugeng P Harianto	2006	2015	
6	Hasriadi Mat Akin	2015	2019	(Note: Elected as Rector for the period of 2015-2019, through the Chancellor election held in September 2015.)
7	Karomani	2019	2022	(Note: Arrested by Indonesian Corruption Eradication Commission for gratification, and sentenced 10 years in prison by Corruption Court of Tanjung Karang, Bandar Lampung.)
8	Mohammad Sofwan Effendi	2022	2022	(Note: As interim officer appointed by 29th Indonesian Ministry of Education, Culture, Research and Technology. Nadiem Makarim.)
9	Lusmeilia Afriani	2023	2027	(Note: Elected as Rector for the period of 2023-2027, through the Chancellor closed election held in December 2022.)

== Notable people ==
- Jihan Nurlela (born 1994), politician and physician
