= Muhammad Ridho Ficardo =

Indonesian politician (born 1980)

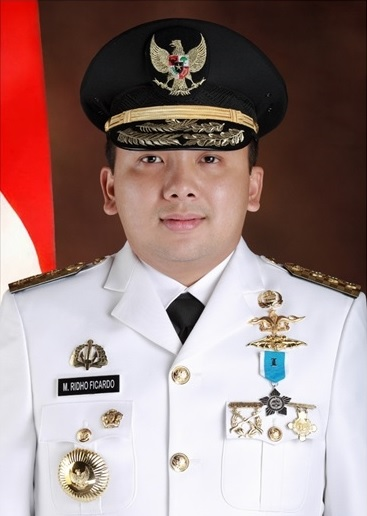

Governor of Lampung
- In office 2 June 2014 – 2 June 2019
- President: Susilo Bambang Yudhoyono; Joko Widodo
- Deputy: Bachtiar Basri
- Preceded by: Sjachroedin Zainal Pagaralam
- Succeeded by: Boytenjuri (acting); Arinal Djunaidi (elect)

Personal details
- Born: 20 July 1980 (age 46) Bandar Lampung, Lampung, Indonesia
- Citizenship: Indonesian
- Party: Demokrat
- Spouse: Aprilani Yustin Ficardo

Muhammad Ridho Ficardo is an Indonesian politician and former governor of the province of Lampung.

Ficardo made his efforts to promote tourism in the province, by hosting Indonesia's International Coffee Day celebrations in 2017,

The same year he also helped to organize a Krakatoa festival commemorating the 1883 eruption of Krakatoa.
