= Mayor of Bandar Lampung =

- Wali Kota Bandar Lampung
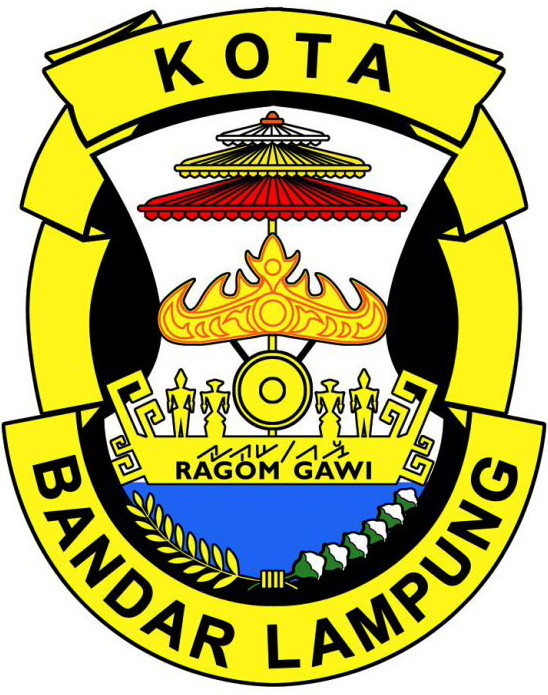
- Coat of arms of Bandar Lampung

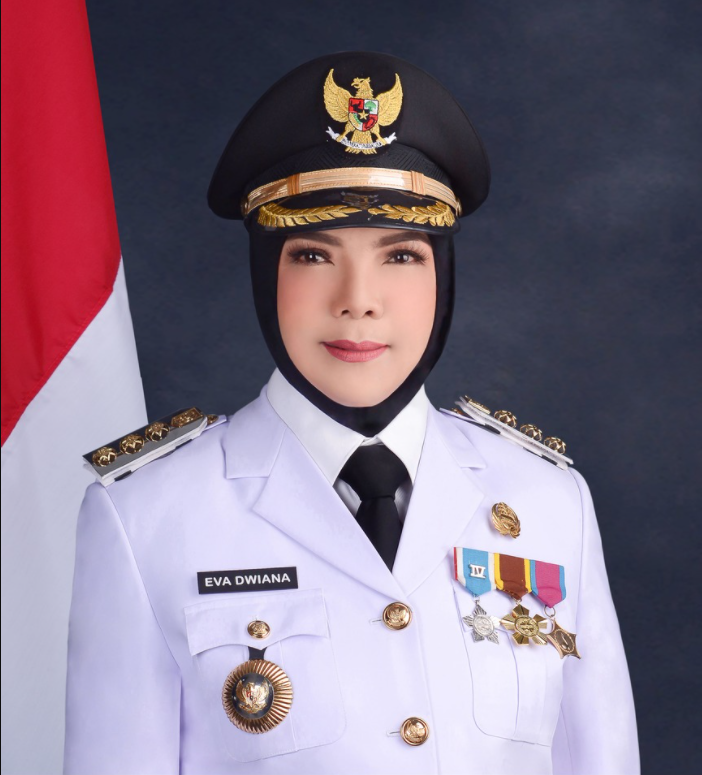
- Incumbent; Eva Dwiana since 26 February 2021
- Term length: 5 years
- Inaugural holder: Sumarsono
- Formation: 1956
- Website: Official website

Mayor of Bandar Lampung is the head of the second-level region who holds the government in Bandar Lampung together with the Vice Mayor and 50 members of the Bandar Lampung City Regional House of Representatives. The mayor and vice mayor of Bandar Lampung are elected through general elections held every 5 years. The first mayor of Bandar Lampung was Sumarsono, who governed the city period from 1956 to 1957.

== List ==
The following is a list of the names of the Mayors of Bandar Lampung from time to time.

Mayor of Bandar Lampung
Num.	Portrait	Mayor	Beginning of office	End of Term	Political Party / Faction	Period	Note.	Vice mayor
1		Sumarsono	1956	1957	Independent	1		N/A
2		Zainal Abidin Pagaralam (1916-1989)	1957	1963	Independent	2		N/A
3		Alimuddin Umar (1928-2012)	1963	1969	Independent	3		N/A
4		Thabranie Daud (1927-2015)	1969	1976	Independent	4		N/A
5		Fauzi Saleh (1939-2018)	1976	1981	Independent	5		N/A
6		Zulkarnain Subing	1981	1986	Independent	6		N/A
7		Abdul Nurdin Muhayat (1939-2018)	1986	1991	Independent	7		N/A
7		Abdul Nurdin Muhayat (1939-2018)	1991	1995	Independent	8		N/A
8		Suharto	1995	2000	Independent	9		Achmad Yulizar
8		Suharto	2000	2005	Independent	10		Achmad Yulizar
9		Eddy Sutrisno (1954-2024)	2005	2010	Independent	11 (2005)		Kherlani
10		Herman Hasanusi (born 1956)	2010	2015	PDI-P	12 (2010)		Tobroni Harun
10		Herman Hasanusi (born 1956)	17 February 2016	17 February 2021	PDI-P	13 (2015)		Yusuf Kohar
11		Eva Dwiana (born 1970)	26 February 2021	20 February 2025	PDI-P	14 (2020)		Deddy Amarullah
11		Eva Dwiana (born 1970)	20 February 2025	Incumbent	Independent	15 (2024)		Deddy Amarullah

== Temporary replacement ==
In the government stack, a regional head who submits himself to leave or temporarily resigns from his position to the central government, then the Minister of Home Affairs prepares a replacement who is a bureaucrat in the regional government or even a vice mayor, including when the mayor's position is in a transition period.

Portrait	Mayor	Party	Beginning	End	Duration	Period	Definitive	Ref.
	Sudarno Eddi (Temporary acting)	Independent	2010	2010	0 years	–	Transition (2010)	
	Sulpakar (born 1969)(Acting)	Independent	15 September 2015	17 February 2016	155 days	–	Transition (2015-2016)	
	Yusuf Kohar (born 1961)(Acting Officer)	Demokrat	15 February 2018	23 June 2018	128 days	13 (2015)	Herman Hasanusi	(Note: Incumbent Mayor Herman HN is on campaign leave for the 2018 Lampung gubernatorial election from 15 February 2018 to 23 June 2018, the position of interim mayor is held by Acting Officer Mayor Yusuf Kohar.)
	Budhi Darmawan (Temporary Acting)	Independent	25 September 2024	23 November 2024	59 days	14 (2020)	Eva Dwiana	(Note: Incumbent Mayor Eva Dwiana and Vice Mayor Deddy Amarullah are on campaign leave for the 2024 Bandar Lampung mayoral election from 25 September 2024 to 23 November 2024, the position of interim regent is held by Temporary Acting Mayor Budhi Darmawan.)

== See also ==
- Bandar Lampung
- List of incumbent regional heads and deputy regional heads in Lampung
