= List of incumbent regional heads and deputy regional heads in Lampung =

The following is an article about the list of Regional Heads and Deputy Regional Heads in 15 regencies/cities in Lampung who are currently still serving.

== List ==
Regency/ City	Photo of the Regent/ Mayor	Regent/ Mayor	Photo of Deputy Regent/ Mayor	Deputy Regent/ Mayor	Taking Office	End of Office (Planned)	Ref.
West Lampung; Regency List of Regents/Deputy Regents		Parosil Mabsus		Mad Hasnurin	20 February 2025	20 February 2030	
South Lampung; Regency List of Regents/Deputy Regents		Radityo Egi Pratama		M. Syaiful Anwar	20 February 2025	20 February 2030	
Central Lampung; Regency List of Regents/Deputy Regents		I Komang Koheri (Acting Officer)			12 December 2025	20 February 2030	
East Lampung; Regency List of Regents/Deputy Regents		Ela Siti Nuryamah		Azwar Hadi	20 February 2025	20 February 2030	
North Lampung; Regency List of Regents/Deputy Regents		Hamartoni Ahadis		Romli	20 February 2025	20 February 2030	
Mesuji; Regency List of Regents/Deputy Regents		Elfianah		Yugi Wicaksono	20 February 2025	20 February 2030	
Pesawaran; Regency List of Regents/Deputy Regents		Nanda Indira Bastian		Antonius Muhammad Ali	27 August 2025	27 August 2030	
Pesisir Barat; Regency List of Regents/Deputy Regents		Dedi Irawan		Irawan Topani	20 February 2025	20 February 2030	
Pringsewu; Regency List of Regents/Deputy Regents		Riyanto Pamungkas		Umi Laila	20 February 2025	20 February 2030	
Tanggamus; Regency List of Regents/Deputy Regents		Mohammad Saleh Asnawi		Agus Suranto	20 February 2025	20 February 2030	
Tulang Bawang; Regency List of Regents/Deputy Regents		Qudratul Ikhwan		Hankam Hasan	20 February 2025	20 February 2030	
West Tulang Bawang; Regency List of Regents/Deputy Regents		Novriwan Jaya		Nadirsyah	20 February 2025	20 February 2030	
Way Kanan; Regency List of Regents/Deputy Regents		Ayu Asalasiyah			10 June 2025	20 February 2030	
Bandar Lampung; City List of Mayors/Deputy mayors		Eva Dwiana		Deddy Amarullah	20 February 2025	20 February 2030	
Metro; City List of Mayors/Deputy mayors		Bambang Iman Santoso		Rafieq Adi Pradana	20 February 2025	20 February 2030	

Notes

- "Commencement of office" is the inauguration date at the beginning or during the current term of office. For acting regents/mayors, it is the date of appointment or extension as acting regent/mayor.
- Based on the Constitutional Court decision Number 27/PUU-XXII/2024, the Governor and Deputy Governor, Regent and Deputy Regent, and Mayor and Deputy Mayor elected in 2020 shall serve until the inauguration of the Governor and Deputy Governor, Regent and Deputy Regent, and Mayor and Deputy Mayor elected in the 2024 national simultaneous elections as long as the term of office does not exceed 5 (five) years.

== See also ==
- Lampung
