= Indonesia Without Discrimination Movement =

Indonesian social equality campaign

The “Indonesia Without Discrimination” Movement (abbreviated to ITD in Bahasa Indonesia) is a campaign to create an Indonesia for all: an Indonesia Without Discrimination. The aim of the movement is to encourage attitudes and behaviors that promote tolerance and anti-discrimination among the Indonesian people. Created as a result of collaboration among a number of civil movements in Jakarta, this campaign is driven by concern about the various forms of discrimination which have been rife in Indonesia since the reformation of 1998.

The ITD Movement believes that civil society can play its role and contribute to changing intolerant attitudes and behaviors and growing discrimination in the community. It can also urge the government to be aware of and promote a spirit of tolerance and anti-discrimination throughout the nation.

The ITD Movement is working to integrate cultural works, including literature, art, music and film, to trigger public awareness in Indonesia about the facts of intolerance and discrimination. Its target is twofold: to strengthen public appreciation of Indonesia's diversity, and to minimize discriminatory public policy until we create an era of an Indonesia Without Discrimination.

The ITD Movement was conceived by Denny JA, a survey expert and Indonesian political consultant who is concerned about a transition to democracy in Indonesia which has been colored by discrimination and violence: discrimination which can be clearly seen in government regulations and acts of intolerance and violence in the community.

Denny JA, founder of the Indonesian Survey Institute Lingkaran Survei Indonesia (LSI), created the Denny JA Foundation for an Indonesia Without Discrimination a vehicle for promoting and championing his vision of an Indonesia Without Discrimination throughout the nation.

== Background of ITD ==
It began with a survey. Through surveys on tolerance conducted periodically by the LSI, Denny JA noticed a disturbing trend over the previous seven years towards increasing intolerance and willingness of the Indonesian people to use violence to solve issues. This fact was made more alarming by the growing number of discriminatory state regulations in certain regions of Indonesia.

The need to do something about this discovery was the initiator of the ITD Movement. There were two goals: to drive change in state policy, and to facilitate positive change in the attitudes of the Indonesian people towards diversity in all its forms. The first step was taken. In March 2012, Denny JA published his collection of poetic essays entitled Atas Nama Cinta, or In the Name of Love. These were stories of discrimination in different guises, based on ethnicity, religion or religious understanding, gender and sexual oriententation.

These five stories of discrimination in the form of poetic essays then metamorphosized into five short 45-minute films. These five films, Romi dan Yuli dari Cikeusik, Bunga Kering Perpisahan, Saputangan Fang Yin, Minah Tetap Dipancung, Cinta Terlarang Batman dan Robin, were produced with well-known director Hanung Bramantyo. As well as becoming films, the poetic essays were also read and recorded musically and theatrically, and can be watched on the website.

Armed with an understanding of social trends through surveys and a number of cultural works, ITD Movement symbolized the importance of one Indonesia: an Indonesia Without Discrimination. Taking advantage of the momentum created by the Sumpah Pemuda (Youth Pledge) ceremony in 2012, the ITD Movement organized a series of events entitled Indonesia Without Discrimination Week. On October 28, 2012, the movement held a mass gathering in front of Hotel Indonesia, Jakarta, with a number of cultural attractions and gymnastic displays. That's where the pledge “Satu Indonesia: Indonesia Tanpa Diskriminasi!” (One Indonesia: an Indonesia Without Discrimination) was born.

Since that moment, the ITD Movement has declared that October 28 will henceforth not only be commemorated as Youth Pledge Day, but also as the day when the country reaffirms its commitment to an Indonesia Without Discrimination. The ITD Movement believes that Indonesia will one day enter an era free of discrimination and intolerance.

== The Foundation ==
To coordinate and mobilize the ITD movement, in September 2012 Denny JA also founded The Denny JA Foundationuntuk Indonesia Without Discrimination: the Denny JA Foundation for an Indonesia Without Discrimination. The name of the foundation includes its primary function of contributing to the vision of one Indonesia: an Indonesia Without Discrimination.

Since it was founded the Denny JA Foundation has held a number of events and activities, including focus group discussions, ITD film screenings, Indonesia Without Discrimination workshops, poetry, painting, photography and song-writing competitions on the Indonesia Without Discrimination theme. The Denny JA Foundation has also staged exhibitions of paintings, digital photo-essays, photo essays and individual photographs, and Indonesia Without Discrimination songs. In the field of research, the Denny JA Foundation has also released the results of two surveys on intolerance, violence and discrimination among the Indonesian public.

The Denny JA Foundation will continue to organize activities to strengthen the spirit of an Indonesia Without Discrimination, and will use a variety of popular cultural media to conduct serious research about public attitudes and trends among Indonesian society.

== Funding and Operations ==
All funding for the ITD Movement comes from personal contributions from the movement's founder Denny JA. His awareness of how important equality is for all Indonesians has moved Denny JA to contribute his energy, thoughts, and money. Denny JA quotes the well-known poem by Robert Frost: “In the road not taken, “This is the road not taken, the road less travelled by” to explain his prophetic motive and mission. Denny admits that the ITD Movement is part of his passion and vision. “Helping minorities who experience discrimination is clearly not popular, and carries a political risk. This is a purely charitable activity, because I am using my own funds. But it needs to be done to create a modern Indonesian civilization,” he argues. This father of the Indonesian political survey hopes that an Indonesia Without Discrimination is not merely one man's dream. He hopes it will become the dream of the entire nation.

In welcoming the winners and visitors to the ITD exhibition, Denny JA also revealed the importance of the Indonesia Without Discrimination campaign through various media, primarily art and culture. Denny is optimistic that Indonesia will one day enter an era free of discrimination. “In the history of advanced civilization, attempts at cultural enlightenment can win. We also want our Indonesia Without Discrimination initiative to win,” he said.

== Progress of ITD ==
The echoes of the ITD Movement began to grow louder after the events of Indonesia Without Discrimination week at the end of October 2012, the realization of the need for an Indonesia Without Discrimination Movement came with the publication of the poetic essays Atas Nama Cinta in March 2012. Beginning with the book, the ITD Movement bloomed into action.

- Poetic Essays

Poetic essays were the starting point of the ITD Movement. This new genre of poetry written by Denny JA contains five stories of discrimination written in a literary style complete with footnotes. The five stories were published as one book, Atas Nama Cinta, in March 2012. Although a limited number of copies were printed, visitors can read the publication in Bahasa Indonesia and English on the website, which has been well received by readers. Between its launch in March 2012 and December 2012, the website received 7.5 million visitors.

Atas Nama Cinta has also received widespread public attention through a number of media reviews in Kompas, Koran Tempo and Media Indonesia daily newspapers, Jurnal Sastra, Gatra, and Majalah Sastra “Horison” magazines, and other local and national publications. The genre of the poetic essay has also stolen the critical spotlight and entered the realms of literature and literary polemics.

- Musical Poetic Essays

Musical poetic essays came about as a direct development from different ways of performing and presenting the poetic essay. The five poems of Atas Nama Cinta were read with musical accompaniment and presented audio-visually. The reading and cultivation of musical poetic essays involved a number of well-known Indonesian cultural figures, including Sutardji Calzoum Bachri, Putu Wijaya, Sujiwo Tedjo, Ine Febriyanti, Niniek L Karim, and Fatin Hamamah. The videos were subsequently uploaded to YouTube, and have been watched by hundreds of thousands of people.

- ITD film

The poetic essays have also been developed into five short films of 45 minutes each under the titles of the five poems in Atas Nama Cinta. Saputangan Fang Yin tells the story of discrimination that befell the ethnic Chinese during the period of reform in 1998. Minah Tetap Dipancung is about the pain and sorrow faced by Indonesias overseas workers.

Bunga Kering Perpisahan tells of the problems of those who fall in love with and marry people of different religions. Romi dan Yuli dari Cikeusik is the story of the conflict of religious understanding between mainstream Indonesian Muslims and members of the Jemaat Ahmadiyah Indonesia sect. Cinta Terlarang Batman dan Robin describes the dilemmas and problems faced by homosexuals in Indonesia.

These five films exploring the most intimate thoughts of each character were produced by Denny JA and well-known director Hanung Bramantyo. They were performed by some of the biggest names in the Indonesian acting world, including seperti Agus Condro, Tyo Pasukodewo, Sazkia Adya Mecca, Leoni, and Peggy Melati Sukma.

- Sapu Tangan Fang Yin disutradarai oleh Karin Bintaro. Para aktor/aktris: Leoni Vitria, Hartanti Reza Nangin, dan Verdi Solaiman
- Romi dan Yuli dari Cikeusik disutradarai oleh Indra Kobutz. Para aktris/aktor: Zascia Adya Mecca, Ben Kasyafani, dan Agus Kuncoro
- Minah Tetap Dipancung disutradarai oleh Indra Kobutz. Para aktris/aktor: Vitta Mariana, Saleh Ali, dan Peggy Melati Sukma.
- Cinta Terlarang Batman dan Robin difilmkan dengan judul Cinta Yang Dirahasiakan disutradarai oleh Rahabi MA. Para aktor: Rizal Syahdan, Zack Nasution, dan Tio Pakusadewo.
- Bunga Kering Perpisahan disutradarai oleh Emil Heradi. Para aktris/aktor: Rawa Nawangish, Arthur Brotolaras, dan Teuku Rifku Wikana.
- Discussions and public screenings

Discussions and public screenings of ITD films are a means of gathering people together to educate them about the Indonesia Without Discrimination community. Discussions about the various forms of discrimination which take place in Indonesia – whether based on ethnicity, religion or religious interpretation, gender or sexual orientation – and public screenings of ITD films have been held among communities both in and outside Jakarta. The Indonesia Without Discrimination movement will continue to organize events to strengthen the Indonesia Without Discrimination movement and help to realize an Indonesia which embraces diversity and rejects discrimination.

- ITD competitions

ITD competitions have stimulated wider public participation in spreading the Indonesia Without Discrimination spirit. The foundation has already organized competitions in poetic essay writing and reviewing, painting, photography and photo essays, and songwriting. A number of these competitions have held for specific groups, including a poetic essay review contest among middle schools in Banten province, but in general they are open to the general public as long as the terms and conditions are fulfilled.

A number of ITD competitions have attracted widespread public participation. For example, the school poetic essay review contest in Banten, with a top prize of ten million rupiah (around US$970), received 120 entries (from the beginning of April to May 28, 2012). The national poetic essay-writing competition (From June 16 to October 28, 2012), which offered prizes totalling 50 million rupiah (a little under US$5,000), attracted 429 entries from people all over the country.

The most prestigious event to date Sementara was the ITD painting competition held from June 16 to September 15, 2012, which offered a top prize of 100 million rupiah (approximately US$9,700) and attracted 114 entries from all over Indonesia. Photographic and other competitions have been no less successful. Over 400 photographs were received from around the archipelago telling the story of different discriminatory practices to compete for prizes totalling 50 million rupiah, and a competition to find the best original song held from June 16 to October 28, 2012 netted 47 new songs from all over the country.

- ITD exhibition

The natural progression from the ITD's nationwide competitions was a collection of week-long exhibitions of art, photography and photo essays, digital photo essays and songs From December 11 to 18 2012. A number of paintings and photographs were displayed at the Sigiart Gallery in Pisa Kafe Mahakam in South Jakarta. These art works not only recorded discrimination but told stories, and even the song entries were tales of discriminatory practices.

The painting “Aku Tidak Menginginkan Hitam-Putih” (I Don't Want Black and White) depicts a pair of children who do not want to be painted in black and white. Although the paintbrush is eager to create their likenesses in monochrome, other colors begin to creep up their arms and into their faces and clothes. The artist is Hudi Alfa, winner of the ITD painting competition and the top prize of 100 million rupiah. Abdurrohman Wahid's entry tells a more explicit story. A well-dressed man is sitting on a chair covering his face with his hands. He is wearing red high heels on his crossed feet. This is the painting “Batman dan Robin/Penolakan Diri” (Batman and Robin/Self-Denial) which won second place.

“Punk not Dead” is a photo essay about discrimination in Serambi Mekah, Nanggroe Aceh Darussalam. Without words, “Punk not Dead” shouts the story of discrimination suffered by the punk community. A photograph titled “Parmalin” shows another expression of discrimination in its depiction of a man brandishing an identity card with an empty space under ‘religion,’ illustrating the problems still faced by religious minorities in Indonesia.

“Airmata Darah” (Tears of Blood), a digital photo essay by Indonesia Without Discrimination movement founder Denny JA clearly conveys the Indonesia Without Discrimination message:

Driven from our legitimate home/ Simply because of our religious beliefs / Muslim in Ambon, Christians in Poso, Hindus in Lampung/ Ahmadiyah in Mataram, Syiah in Sampang/ And Kaharingan in Central Kalimantan.

People flocked to the opening of the exhibition, which was covered by a number of national printed and electronic media. Artist Arahmaiani applied his brush to a blank canvas and wrote the words “Indonesia Without Discrimination,” and visitors added their own messages. The once white canvass was now covered with color, conveying the spirit of an Indonesia Without Discrimination.

- ITD survey

The ITD movement also bases its activities on research and surveys into the Indonesian public's take on tolerance and discrimination issues. By the end of December 2012, the ITD movement had carried out and released the results of two surveys, the first on the increase in the number of Indonesian people who are uncomfortable with diversity. The findings of this national survey by the Denny JA Foundation and LSI Community from October 1 to 8 2012 were presented at a press conference on October 21, 2012.

The survey showed an increase in the public's discomfort towards those from different backgrounds. Compared with a 2005 LSI survey, the Indonesian public have grown less comfortable with their neighbors of different religions, including the Shia and Ahmadiyah, and with homosexuality. More worryingly, public willingness to use violence has also increased significantly, from just 9.8% to 24% in 2012.

The second survey covered the worst five cases of discriminatory violence since reform in 1998. The survey was released under the title Wanted: 2014 Presidential Candidate to Defend Diversity on December 23, 2012. The survey showed that 67.5% of Indonesians rate the presidency of Susilo Bambang Yudhoyono as less than effective in protecting primordial diversity in Indonesia, and the public believes this has triggered widespread discrimination and violence. The Indonesian public is hoping a 2014 presidential candidate will appear who is able to defend diversity in an Indonesia Without Discrimination.

- Charity

The ITD movement is also involved in charitable events. Working with the Task Force for Child Protection, the ITD movement sent a team of storytellers to console the child victims of discrimination and violence against Shiites during the Sampang evacuation in Madura, East Java.

The Sampang tragedy is another black stain of discrimination and intolerance towards diversity in Indonesia. One week after Idul Fitri celebrations, on August 26, 2012, a mob attacked the homes of over 600 Shiite Muslims in three villages in the Omben district of Sampang, Madura. Thirty seven Shiite homes were destroyed, one person died and six others were wounded. The team of storytellers left Jakarta on August 30 and stayed in Sampang for one month with the personal support of Denny JA, founder of the ITD movement. .
