= Tanonaka =

Tanonaka (written: 田野中) is a Japanese surname. Notable people with the surname include:

- Isamu Tanonaka (田の中 勇, 1932–2010), Japanese voice actor
- Dalton Tanonaka (born 1954), American television executive
- Tasuku Tanonaka (田野中 輔, born 1978), Japanese hurdler
