= 2024 Bandar Lampung mayoral election =

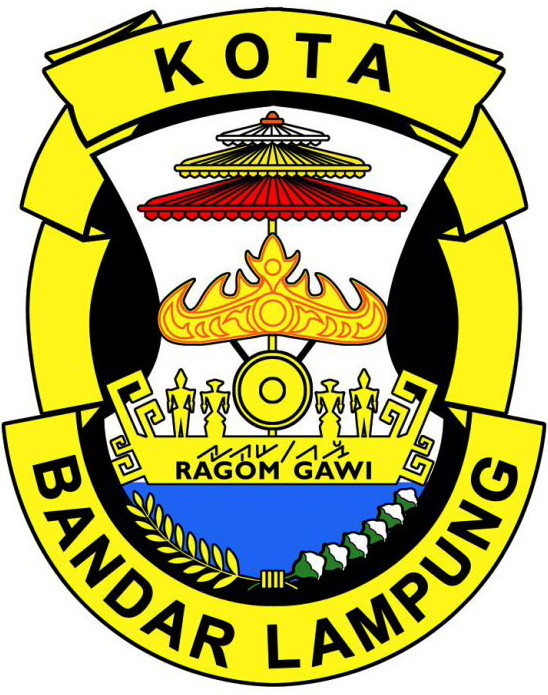
- 27 November 2024
- Turnout: 52.04%
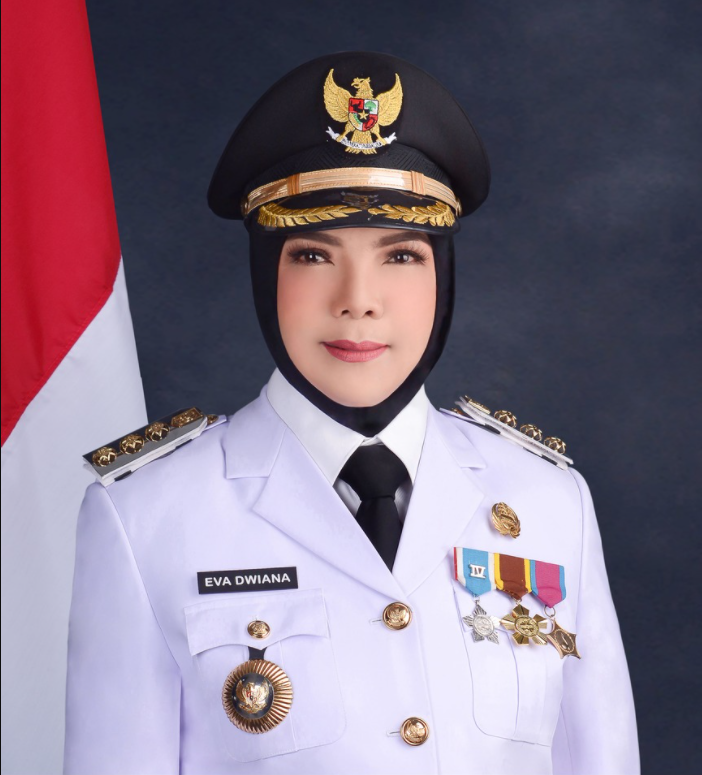

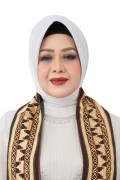
Candidate	Eva Dwiana	Reihana
Party	PDI-P (Note: Despite Eva Dwiana being a member of the PDI-P, the party instead backed Reihana)	PDI-P
Alliance	KIM Plus
Running mate	Deddy Amarullah	Aryodhia Febriansyah
Popular vote	264,740	91,740
Percentage	74.27%	25.73%
Mayor before election
Eva Dwiana
PDI-P
Elected mayor
Eva Dwiana
PDI-P

The 2024 Bandar Lampung mayoral election was held on 27 November 2024 as part of nationwide local elections to elect the mayor and vice mayor of Bandar Lampung for a five-year term. The previous election was held in 2020. Mayor Eva Dwiana won a landslide re-election, securing 74% of the vote. She defeated Reihana, a former head of the Bandar Lampung Health Department, who received 25%.

== Electoral system ==
The election, like other local elections in 2024, follow the first-past-the-post system where the candidate with the most votes wins the election, even if they do not win a majority. It is possible for a candidate to run uncontested, in which case the candidate is still required to win a majority of votes "against" an "empty box" option. Should the candidate fail to do so, the election will be repeated on a later date.

== Candidates ==
According to electoral regulations, in order to qualify for the election, candidates were required to secure support from a political party or a coalition of parties controlling 10 seats (20 percent of all seats) in the Bandar Lampung Regional House of Representatives (DPRD). With 10 seats, the Gerindra Party is the only party eligible to nominate a mayoral candidate without forming a coalition with other parties. Candidates may alternatively demonstrate support to run as an independent in form of photocopies of identity cards, which in Bandar Lampung's case corresponds to 59,260 copies. According to the General Elections Commission, no independent candidates registered or expressed interest in running by the set deadline.

=== Potential ===
The following are individuals who have either been publicly mentioned as a potential candidate by a political party in the DPRD, publicly declared their candidacy with press coverage, or considered as a potential candidate by media outlets:

- Eva Dwiana (PDI-P), incumbent mayor.
- Yusirwan (PAN), member of the Lampung Regional House of Representatives.
- Reihana, former head of Bandar Lampung's city health department.
- Iqbal Ardiansyah, chairman of the Indonesian National Youth Committee's Lampung branch.

== Political map ==
Following the 2024 Indonesian legislative election, eight political parties are represented in the Bandar Lampung DPRD:

Political parties	Seat count
Great Indonesia Movement Party (Gerindra)	10 / 50
NasDem Party	7 / 50
Prosperous Justice Party (PKS)	7 / 50
Indonesian Democratic Party of Struggle (PDI-P)	6 / 50
Party of Functional Groups (Golkar)	6 / 50
National Awakening Party (PKB)	5 / 50
Democratic Party (Demokrat)	5 / 50
National Mandate Party (PAN)	4 / 50

== Results ==
Candidate	Running mate	Party	Votes	%
Eva Dwiana	Deddy Amarullah	Indonesian Democratic Party of Struggle	264,740	74.27
Reihana	Aryodhia Febriansyah	Indonesian Democratic Party of Struggle	91,740	25.73
Total			356,480	100.00
Valid votes			356,480	87.14
Invalid/blank votes			52,613	12.86
Total votes			409,093	100.00
Registered voters/turnout			786,182	52.04
Source: KPU
