= Surya Paloh =

Indonesian politician

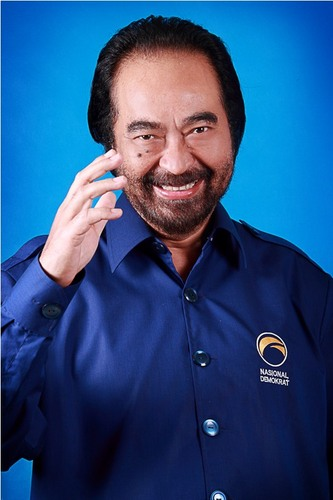
- Surya Paloh in 2015

2nd Chairman of the NasDem Party
- Incumbent
- Assumed office 25 January 2013
- Preceded by: Patrice Rio Capella

Chairman of the Golkar Party Advisory Board
- In office 19 December 2004 – 8 October 2009
- Chairman: Jusuf Kalla
- Succeeded by: Akbar Tandjung

Member of the People's Consultative Assembly
- In office 1 October 1977 – 30 September 1988

Personal details
- Born: Surya Dharma Paloh; 16 July 1951 (age 75) Kutaraja, Indonesia
- Party: NasDem Party
- Other political affiliations: Golkar (1968–2011); Coalition of Change for Unity (2023–2024)
- Spouse: Rosita Barack (m. 1984)
- Children: Prananda Paloh
- Parents: Muhammad Daud Paloh (father); Nursiah Paloh (mother)
- Relatives: Nova Harivan Paloh (nephew); Reino Barack (nephew); Rico Waas (nephew)
- Education: University of North Sumatra; North Sumatra Islamic University (Doctorandus)
- Occupation: Politician; media mogul
- Known for: Chairman of Media Group; Founder of NasDem Party

Surya Dharma Paloh (born 16 July 1951) is an Indonesian politician and media mogul. He owns Media Group, a conglomerate company that includes the Media Indonesia daily newspaper and MetroTV, a 24-hour news television channel. In politics, he was the chairman of the advisory board of the Golkar Party, currently the second biggest political party in Indonesia. He is also the founder of National Democrat mass organization, which later gave birth to the NasDem Party (Partai Nasional Demokrat or Partai NasDem) on 26 July 2011.

== Honours ==
- Indonesia
  - Medal of Pioneership (Indonesian: Medali Kepeloporan) (14 August 2024)
  - Star of Mahaputera (3rd Class) (Indonesian: Bintang Mahaputera Utama) (13 August 2015)
