= Indonesia Now =

- Title card from 2006 to 2011
- Presented by: Dalton Tanonaka; Kania Sutisnawinata
- Country of origin: Indonesia
- Original language: English

Production
- Executive producer: Rullah Malik
- Producer: Devianti Faridz
- Running time: 30 minutes

Original release
- Network: Metro TV
- Release: 1 September 2006 – 2017

Related
- Indonesia This Morning

Indonesia Now is a weekly program broadcast by Metro TV, read in English, and broadcast by television stations around the world. Indonesia Now is the first international program from Indonesia, first aired on 1 September 2006 to explain Indonesian news or Asian news. It has been broadcasting the program since 11 August 2007, at 7:00 a.m. WIB (every Saturday) and 1:00 p.m. WIB (every Sunday), with hosts Kania Sutisnawinata and Dalton Tanonaka.

== Segments ==
- "IndoBiz", for marketing.
- "Asia Watch", reports Asian news.
- "Destination Indonesia", reviews destinations in Indonesia.
- "Islam Today", reports Islamic religion in Indonesia.

== Anchors ==
- Dalton Tanonaka, former anchor from NHK World, NBC Asia, CNN International and CNBC Asia.
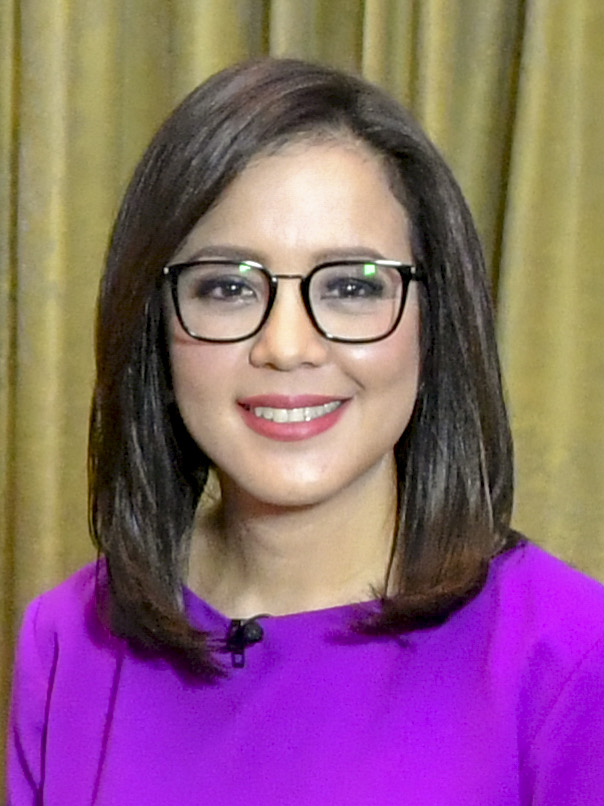
- Kania Sutisnawinata
  Kania Sutisnawinata, Metro TV business news anchor. He used to be SCTV's anchor.
- Fifi Aleyda Yahya
- Andini Effendi
- Ajeng Kamaratih
- Sara Wayne
- Iqbal Himawan, current Metro TV news anchor.
