= Metro TV (Indonesian TV network) =

Indonesian news and sports television network

- Logo used since 20 May 2010
- Type: Television broadcaster
- Country: Indonesia
- Broadcast area: Nationwide; Worldwide (via YouTube)
- Headquarters: Media Group Building, Jl. Pilar Mas Raya Kav. A-D, Kebon Jeruk, West Jakarta

Programming
- Languages: Indonesian; English; Mandarin
- Picture format: 1080i HDTV (downscaled to 16:9 576i for the SDTV feed)

Ownership
- Owner: Media Group
- Key people: Arief Suditomo
- Sister channels: BN Channel; Magna Channel; Metro Globe Network

History
- Founded: 25 June 1997; 29 years ago (as MTI TV also corporate); 25 November 1997; 28 years ago (Official birthday and anniversary)
- Launched: 4 May 2000; 26 years ago (as Metro TV); 25 October 2000 (Trial broadcast); 25 November 2000; 25 years ago (Official broadcast)
- Founder: Surya Paloh; Sumita Tobing
- Former names: MTI TV (1997–2000)

Links
- Website: www.metrotvnews.com

Availability

Terrestrial
- Digital: Check local frequencies (in Indonesian language)

Streaming media
- MIVO: Watch live
- Official: Watch live
- IndiHome TV: Watch live (IndiHome customers only)
- Vidio: Watch live
- Vision+: Watch live (Subscription required, Indonesia only)

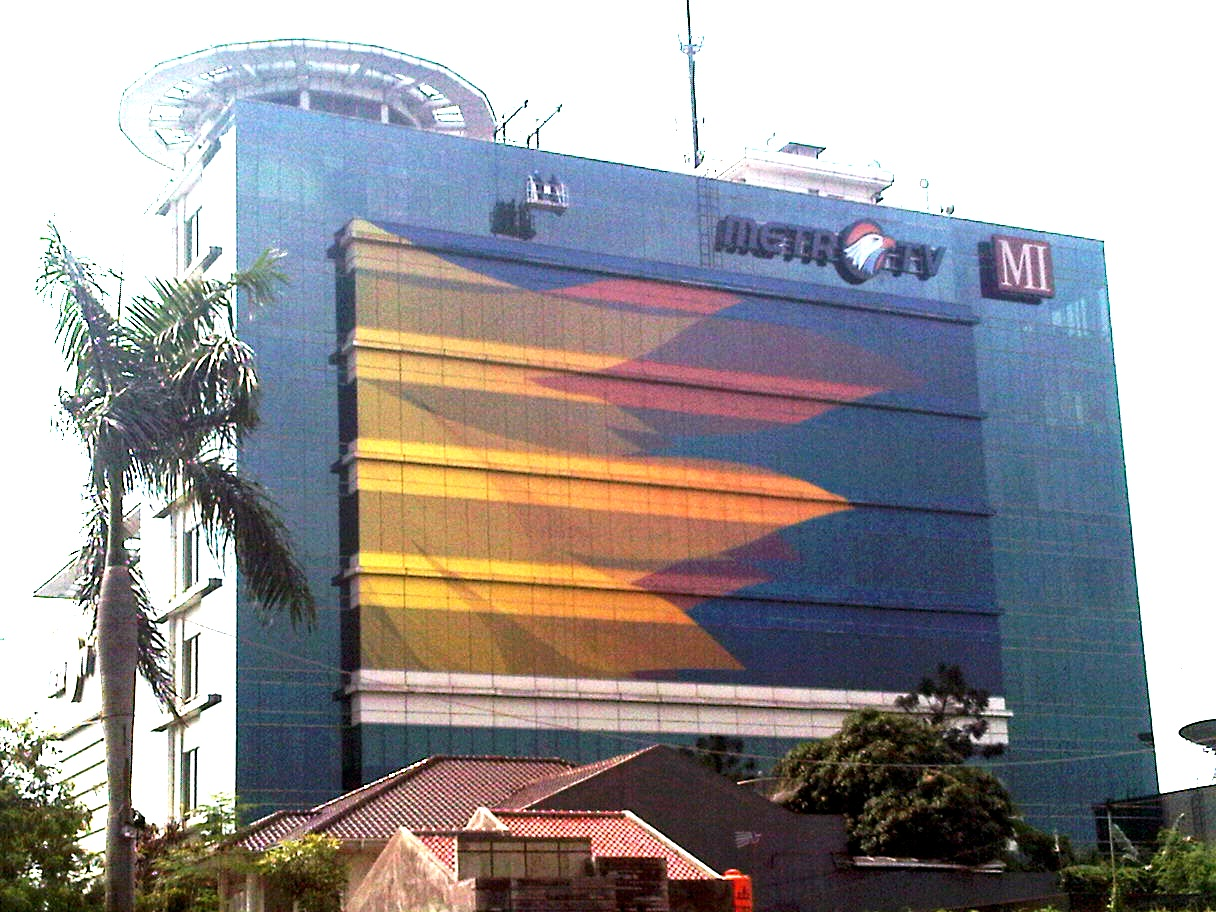
Media Group office in Kebon Jeruk, West Jakarta, the headquarters of Metro TV.

PT Media Televisi Indonesia, commonly operating and known as Metro TV formerly as DVN TV, is an Indonesian free-to-air news and sports television network based in West Jakarta. It was launched on 25 November, 2000, and now has over 52 relay stations around the country. It is owned by Surya Paloh, who also owns the Media Indonesia daily. These two news outlets, along with other newspapers distributed in different parts of Indonesia, make up Media Group.

Metro TV offers Mandarin language news programs. It does not offer soap operas, although it had broadcast entertainment and multicultural programs such as the now-defunct tech show e-Lifestyle, the satirical news and current affairs show News Dot Com / Republik Mimpi (The Dream Republic), musical programming such as Musik+ and Idenesia, and other special or regional programming. Metro TV is considered to be the mouthpiece of the NasDem Party.

== History ==
Metro TV was launched on 25 November 2000 by Abdurrahman Wahid, the fourth President of Indonesia. Metro TV was the first Indonesian television network to have been officially inaugurated by the Indonesian president, after RCTI.

On 25 November 2020, during the network's 20th anniversary, its on-air bug was replaced with the eagle icon of the current logo with the text "METRO TV" in a smaller size below the eagle, although the text was removed during advertisements, leaving only the eagle visible in a light grey color. On 25 November 2021, the text "METRO TV" in smaller size below the eagle was removed entirely as part of on-screen revamp. The full logo with text is still used for corporate purposes and other branding.

Since 3 November 2022, Metro TV stopped airing over PAL broadcasts for the Greater Jakarta area, and then on 3 December 2022, Metro TV shut down the analog terrestrial broadcasts in Bandung, Semarang, Surakarta, Yogyakarta and Batam before Palembang following the move on 31 March 2023.

In November 2023, Metro TV signed a content sharing agreement with Chinese state media outlet China Media Group.

== Programming ==
Metro TV broadcasts 24 hours a day, focusing on international and domestic news coverage.

Metro TV broadcasts three English language programs: World News, Indonesia Now, and Talk Indonesia. It also had Chinese language programmes such as Metro Xin Wen, as well as IT, documentary, and culinary programmes. It has a motivational talkshow, Mario Teguh Golden Ways. It also shows business programming, including "Economic Challenges" and Bisnis Hari Ini (Business Today, no longer aired).

Metro TV also has an informercial block, usually residential, but sometimes with any price of product or technology. The infomercial block usually airs on networks and stations during morning on weekends. The block has no commercial breaks. This channel is owned by Media Group, which also owns Media Indonesia and Lampung Post newspapers.

Metro TV also broadcasts Metro This Morning and News Flash. Metro This Morning ended in October 2007.

Metro TV was the only news channel in Indonesia until 2008, when Lativi was rebranded as tvOne, dropping all sitcoms and soap operas, focusing on news and sports programmes.

=== Metro ===
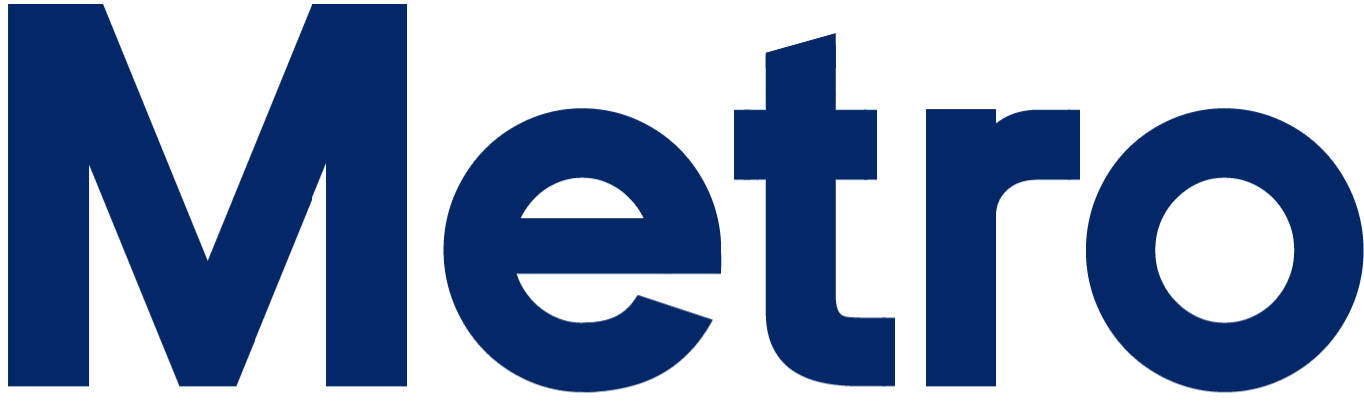
The logo of Metro news program since 2023

Metro is the flagship television news program that broadcasts on Metro TV. There is no single show; it instead consists of Metro Pagi Primetime (morning), Metro Siang (lunchtime), Metro Hari Ini (afternoon), Primetime News (evening), and Top News (late night).

==== Shows ====
Before 24 November 2017, the shows Metro Kini (morning) and Metro Sore (afternoon) were still aired before the date, and Metro Pagi Primetime was originally named Metro Pagi.

The time slot history follows.

==== Metro Hari Ini ====
- 18:30-19:30 WIB (25 November 2000 – 31 March 2001, Monday-Friday)
- 18:30-19:00 WIB (27 November 2000 – 1 April 2001, Saturday-Sunday)
- 18:05-19:30 WIB (2 April 2001 – 22 November 2002, Monday-Friday)
- 18:05-19:00 WIB (7 April 2001 – 24 November 2002, Saturday-Sunday)
- 18:05-19:00 WIB (25 November 2002 – 24 November 2008)
- 17:30-19:00 WIB (25 November 2008 – 20 May 2010)
- 17:05-19:00 WIB (21 May 2010 – 2012)
- 16:30-18:00 WIB (2013–2017)
- 16:30-18:00 WIB (2017–2019 (for Monday to Friday), 2017–2018 (for Saturday and Sunday))
- 16:30-17:30 WIB (2018 – 31 December 2020, for Saturday and Sunday)
- 15:30-17:00 WIB (2019 and 2021 during Ramadan month only)
- 16:00-17:30 WIB (2020 – 31 December 2020, for Monday-Friday)
- 14:30-16:00 WIB (2020, Ramadhan 1441 Hijri)
- 16:00-17:30 WIB (2021–present)

==== Metro Pagi Primetime ====
- 05:30-07:30 WIB (1 April 2001 – 22 November 2002, From Monday To Friday)
- 06:05-07:00 WIB (2 April 2001 – 24 November 2002, From Saturday To Sunday)
- 05:30-07:00 WIB (25 November 2002 – 30 November 2003, From Monday to Sunday, 1 December 2003 – 24 April 2005, From Monday to Friday)
- 05:30-06:30 WIB (25 April 2005 – 24 November 2005)
- 05:05-06:30 WIB (25 November 2005 – 17 February 2008)
- 05:05-06:00 WIB (18 February 2008 – 24 November 2008)
- 04:30-06:00 WIB (25 November 2008 – 24 November 2009)
- 04:30-07:00 WIB (25 November 2009 – 31 December 2013, 2017–2020)
- 04:30-06:00 WIB (1 January 2014 – 2016, 2017 for Saturday editions)
- 06:05-07:00 WIB (2020)
- 05:05-06:30 WIB (2021–2022)
- 04:30-06:30 WIB (2022–2023)
- 04:00-06.30 WIB (2023)
- 04:00-06:30 WIB (2023–present)

==== Metro Siang ====
- 12:00-12:30 WIB (25 November 2000 – 31 March 2001)
- 12:00-13:00 WIB (2013–2015 (for Monday to Friday), 2015–2016 (for Saturday and Sunday))
- 11:30-12:30 WIB (2001–2004 (for Monday to Friday), 2014–2015 (for Saturday and Sunday))
- 11:00-13:00 WIB (2004–2012, 2017 – 31 December 2020) (for Monday to Friday), (2018 – 31 December 2020), (for Saturday and Sunday), (2021–present)
- 11:30-13:00 WIB (2013–2014, 2015–2016 (for Monday to Friday))
- 11:00-12:00 WIB (2017–2018 (for Saturday and Sunday))

=== Meet Nite Live ===
Meet Nite Live is a satirical-wrapped late-night talk show that airs since 21 March 2025, hosted by Valentinus Resa and Otonk Setiabudi. It is a reincarnation of the similarly named Midnight Live, and is broadcast on weekdays from 10:30pm to 11:30pm.

==== Midnight Live ====
Midnight Live is the predecessor of the aforementioned reincarnation, a program combining interviews with on-scene report on real-life issues and behavior trends, broadcast weekdays from midnight to 1:30 am. The program explores a specific topic, with people interviewed live in the studio, while an on-scene reporter covers the topic. Midnight Live also had interactive segments where viewers could give live comments through call-ins and text messages. It was the highest-rated talk program during midnight by a television station in Indonesia.

== Visual identity ==
=== Slogans ===
- Leading the Change (2007–2008)
- Be Smart Be Informed (2008–2010)
- Knowledge to Elevate (2010–present)

==== Anniversary specials ====
- News Media Telecast Service (2001)
- All for the Best (2002)
- Triple Star, Triple Experience (2003)
- Excellent Four (2004)
- Moment of Hope (2005)
- Proud of Dedication (2006)
- Leading the Change (2007)
- Proud of Our Nation (2008)
- Cinta Negeriku (Loves of My Nation) (2009)
- Ten Years for the Nation (2010)
- Menuju Indonesia Gemilang (Towards a Brilliant Indonesia) (2011)
- Bersama Menginspirasi Bangsa (Together Inspirate the Nation) (2012)
- Tetap Terbaik (Still the Best) (2013)
- Semakin Terpercaya (More Trusted) (2014)
- Membangun Bangsa Berdaya (Build the Empower Nation) (2015)
- Menggerakkan Harapan Bangsa (Moving the Nations Hope) (2016)
- Adiwarna Bangsa (Supercolor of the Nation) (2017)
- Melangkah Bersama untuk Indonesia (Stepping Together for Indonesia) (2018)
- Menebar Inspirasi (Spreading the Inspiration) (2019)
- Terima kasih Indonesia (Thank you Indonesia) (2020)
- Kebersamaan Memberi Arti (Togetherness Gives Meaning) (2021)
- Bangkit Bergerak Bersama (Get Up and Move Together) (2022)
- Merayakan Kebersamaan (Celebrating the Togetherness) (2023)
- Mengawal Transformasi (Overseeing the Transformation) (2024)
- Journey with Empathy (2025)

== See also ==
- Indonesia Now
- List of television stations in Indonesia
