= The Indonesia Channel =

Television channel

- Country: Indonesia
- Broadcast area: Indonesia, Hong Kong, Malaysia, Netherlands, the Philippines, Singapore, and the United States
- Headquarters: Jakarta, Indonesia

Programming
- Language: English

Ownership
- Owner: PT Melia Media International

History
- Launched: 2 June 2014; 12 years ago (first incarnation); 2 October 2019; 7 years ago (second); 1 January 2026; 9 months ago (third and current incarnation)
- Closed: 29 February 2016; 10 years ago (first incarnation); 31 March 2023; 3 years ago (second incarnation)

Availability

Streaming media
- Website: (free, international feed)

The Indonesia Channel is an international English-language television channel based in Jakarta, Indonesia. The channel is run by an international team of broadcast professionals, acquiring and producing content for global distribution.

The programming lineup blends hot entertainment programs with compelling news and talk shows.

Launched in June 2014, the network airs news programs, lifestyle programs, talk show programs, food programs, travel programs, sports programs, TV dramas under Drama Hour, and films under Indocinema.

The Indonesia Channel is privately funded and the channel is currently owned by PT Melia Media International.

The first incarnation was shut down in Asia and parts of Europe and North America on 29 February 2016. The second incarnation was introduced on 2 October 2019.

The second incarnation was shut down in Asia and parts of Europe and North America on 31 March 2023. The third and current incarnation was introduced on 1 January 2026.

== Hosts ==
- Dalton Tanonaka
- Louisa Kusnandar
- Prisma Kinanti
- Lorraine Hahn
- ASYIFA LATIEF
- Jamie Aditya
- Yenny Wahid
- Jemima Tumewu
- Janice Hermijanto

The Indonesia Channel Presenters

== Programs ==
- Hot Indonesia
- ASEAN Today
- I-Pop Playlist
- Foodiepedia
- Drive Time
- Indonesia Hotspots
- Yoga Bliss
- IndoCinema
- The Home Team
- Indonesia Newsbreak

== Milestones ==
- June 2, 2014: The Indonesia Channel was launched in both Jakarta, Indonesia and Hong Kong, this is the second Indonesian channel to launch on now TV.
- September 2, 2014: The Indonesia Channel was launched on UPC in the Netherlands.
- October 1, 2014: The Indonesia Channel was launched on StarHub TV.
- March 14, 2015: Some programs distributed on MHz Networks
- February 29, 2016: The Indonesia Channel suspended its broadcast in Indonesia, Hong Kong, Malaysia, Netherlands, Philippines, Singapore and the U.S.
- October 2, 2019: The Indonesia Channel was relaunched with new programs and lineup.
- April 20, 2021: The Indonesia Channel was launched on both ONIP TV and PZAZ TV.
- December 14, 2021: The Indonesia Channel was launched on MyRepublic channel 574.
- March 31, 2023: The second incarnation suspended its broadcast in Indonesia, Hong Kong, Malaysia, Netherlands, Philippines, Singapore and the U.S.
- January 1, 2026: The current incarnation was launched across Indonesia, Hong Kong, Malaysia, Netherlands, Philippines, Singapore and the U.S.
