= Eva Dwiana =

Indonesian politician (born 1970)

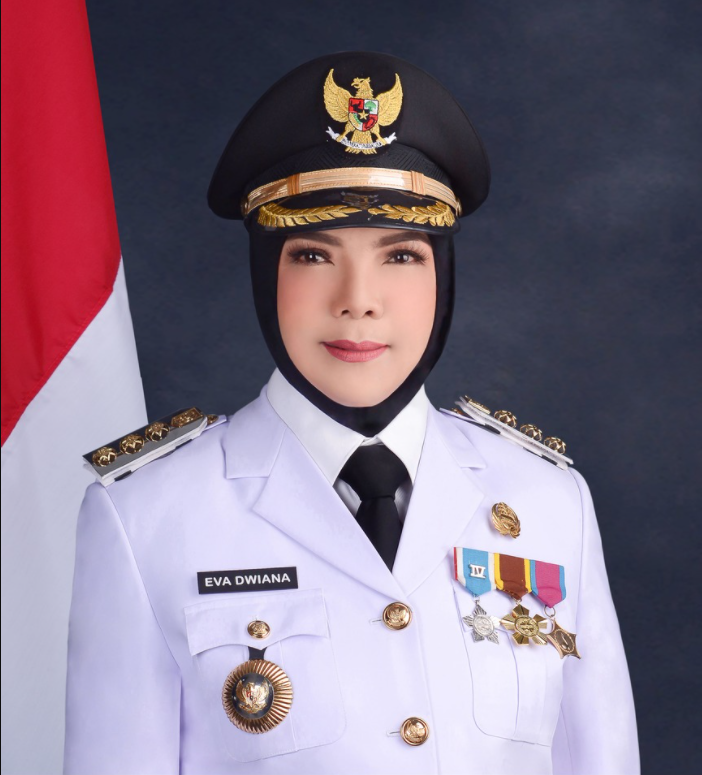
- Official portrait

Mayor of Bandar Lampung
- Incumbent
- Assumed office 26 February 2021
- Preceded by: Herman Hasanusi

Member of Lampung Regional House of Representatives
- In office 1 September 2014 – 4 September 2020

Personal details
- Born: 25 April 1970 (age 56) Bandar Lampung, Lampung, Indonesia
- Party: PDI-P

Eva Dwiana (born 25 April 1970) is an Indonesian politician who is the current mayor of Bandar Lampung. Before becoming mayor, she served as a provincial legislator in Lampung, being elected for two terms. She is married to Herman Hasanusi who was her predecessor as mayor.

== Early life and career ==
Eva Dwiana was born in Bandar Lampung (then known as Tanjung Karang) on 25 April 1970. Her father, Iskandar Zulkarnaen, originated from Muara Enim, while her mother Dahniar hailed from West Sumatra. She studied in Bandar Lampung, graduating from the city's Petra High School in 1990. She would later receive a degree at the Indonesian Entrepreneur University.

She married Herman Hasanusi, who was elected mayor of Bandar Lampung in 2010, and the couple has 4 children. Her eldest son died at age 14 after returning from an umrah pilgrimage, and Eva in 2007 created a women's organisation named in her son's honor.

== Political career ==
Eva ran as a candidate for the Lampung Regional House of Representatives in the 2014 legislative election as a member of PDI-P, and was elected with 19,818 votes. She was sworn in on 1 September 2014. In the 2019 election, Eva ran for a second term and was reelected with 86,258 votes, the highest of all candidates for the provincial legislature.

In the 2020 mayoral election, with her husband at his term limit, Eva received the support of PDI-P, Nasdem and Gerindra to run as mayor. Her running mate was Dedi Amrullah, a former civil servant. The pair defeated two other candidates after winning 249,241 votes (57.3%). However, the central General Elections Commission initially disqualified her candidacy after the election citing large-scale administrative violations. In January 2021, the Supreme Court of Indonesia overturned the disqualification. Eva was sworn in as mayor on 26 February 2021, becoming the first female mayor of Bandar Lampung. Following her inauguration, she named COVID-19 handling and flood management as the focus of her tenure.

She was reelected for a second term as mayor in the 2024 mayoral election, winning 264,740 votes (74.3%). In the election, she did not receive the backing of PDI-P, and while she remained a party member she ran against and defeated the party's chosen candidate. The party would fire several other candidates in the election in December 2024 who had similarly run against the party candidate, but these did not include Eva.

In July 2025, Antara reported that Eva was promoting a proposed peraturan daerah (regional regulation) to ban 2SLGBTQIA+ minority social communities from existing in the city.

== Honours ==
- Lencana Melati, Gerakan Pramuka
- Lencana Karya Bakti, Gerakan Pramuka
- Lencana Darma Bakti Pramuka, Gerakan Pramuka
- Lencana Pancawarsa IV Gerakan Pramuka
