= NasDem Party =

NasDem Party Partai NasDem
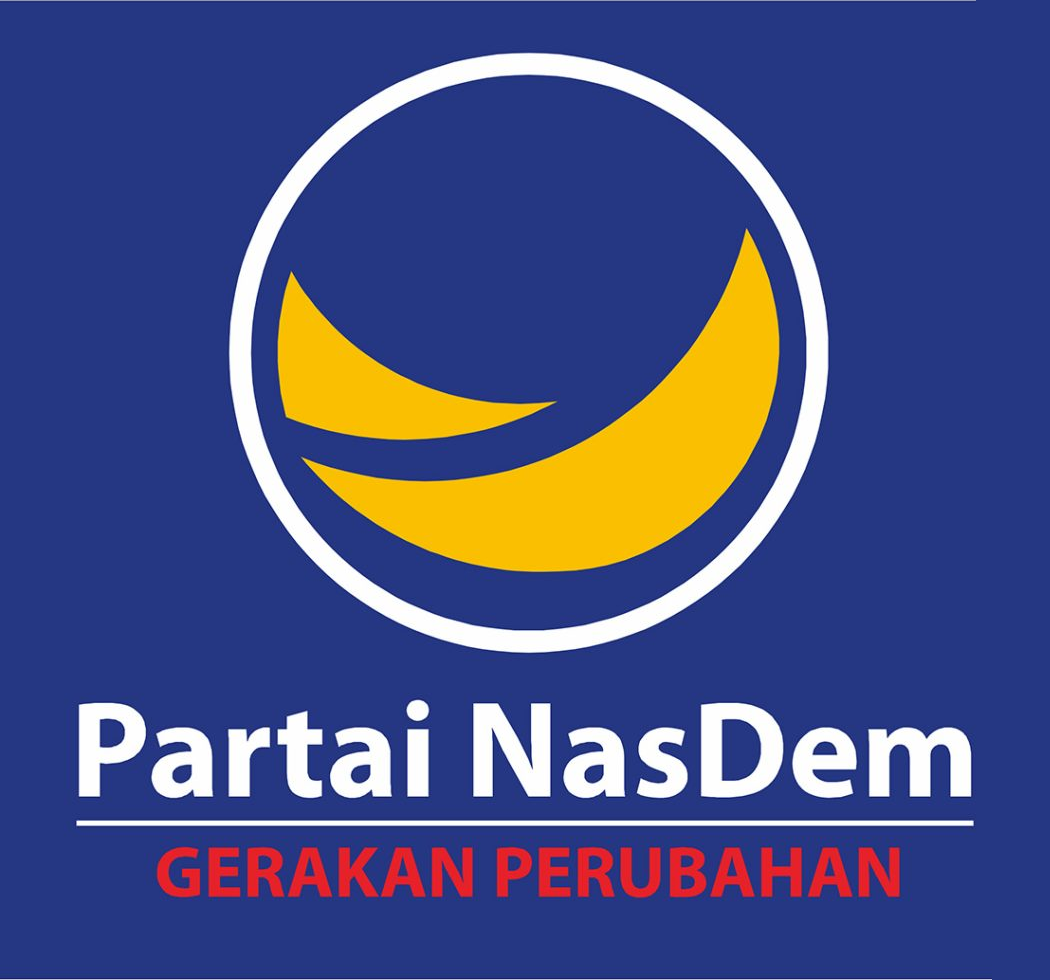
- General Chairman: Surya Paloh
- Secretary-General: Hermawi Taslim
- DPR group leader: Viktor Laiskodat
- Founders: Surya Paloh; Hamengkubuwana X
- Founded: 1 February 2011; 15 years ago
- Split from: Golkar
- Headquarters: Jakarta
- Student wing: Liga Mahasiswa NasDem (NasDem Student League)
- Youth wing: Garda Pemuda NasDem (NasDem Youth Guard)
- Women's wing: Garnita Malahayati (Malahayati Women's Guard)
- Membership (2022): 395,949
- Ideology: Pancasila; Indonesian nationalism Secularism; Social democracy Social liberalism Progressivism
- Political position: Centre-left
- National affiliation: Advanced Indonesia Coalition Plus (since 2024; in government coalition supply) Former: Coalition of Change for Unity; (2023–2024); Onward Indonesia Coalition; (2018–2023); Great Indonesia Coalition; (2014–2018)
- International affiliation: Progressive Alliance
- Regional affiliation: Network of Social Democracy in Asia<
- Slogan: Gerakan Perubahan ('Movement of Change')
- Anthem: "Hymne Partai NasDem" ('NasDem Party Hymn') "Mars Partai NasDem" ('NasDem Party March')
- Ballot number: 5
- DPR seats: 69 / 580
- DPRD I seats: 265 / 2,372
- DPRD II seats: 1,849 / 17,510

Website
- nasdem.id

The NasDem Party (Indonesian: Partai NasDem), or the National Democratic Party (Indonesian: Partai Nasional Demokrat, lit. 'National Democrats Party') is an Indonesian political party. Centre-left and progressive, this party carries the theme of change and restoration of the Indonesian nation. It is partly funded by media baron Surya Paloh who founded the similarly named organization, Nasional Demokrat (Indonesian: Nasional Demokrat). Despite this, and logo similarity, Nasional Demokrat has insisted that it is not linked with the party.

== History ==
The party has its origins in a now-dormant youth-focused NGO called Nasional Demokrat (National Democrats) founded by Surya Paloh, who owns the media conglomerate Media Group, and Hamengkubuwono X, the sultan of Yogyakarta in 2010. It received extensive coverage on media owned by Surya Paloh. In 2011, Hamengkubuwono left the organization, unhappy with its transformation into a political party. Less than a month later, Surya Paloh formed the NasDem Party, and appointed former National Mandate Party (PAN) politician Patrice Rio Capella as its first chairman.

The party was officially declared on 26 July 2011, although it had previously registered to the Ministry of Law and Human Rights in March. At the party's first convention in January 2013, Surya Paloh was appointed party chairman for the 2013 - 2018 term. The conference also conferred on him full authority to determine party strategy and policies and to win the 2014 election. Later the same month, one of the other founders and financial backers, media tycoon Hary Tanoesoedibjo, founder of the Media Nusantara Citra media group, suddenly left the party in protest at Surya Paloh's appointment and defected to the People's Conscience Party, led by former general Wiranto. Hary subsequently became that party's vice-presidential candidate. In late 2013 the NasDem Party applied to contest the 2014 elections, and on 7 January 2014 the General Elections Commission (KPU) announced that the NasDem was the only new party that met all the requirements. It competed along with 12 other national parties.

Before founding the party, Surya Paloh had been a senior member of the Golkar Party for 40 years and rose to become chairman of the party's advisory council. He contested the presidential nomination at the 2004 Golkar convention, but lost. In 2009, Golkar nominated Jusuf Kalla as its candidate. However, Surya Paloh has "repeatedly denied" that he formed the NasDem Party to allow him to run for the presidency again. During the 2014 election campaign, the Indonesian Broadcasting Commission criticized Surya Paloh-owned news network Metro TV for its excessive coverage of the party.

In June 2021, the party again came under fire from public when one of its cadre, parliament speaker of Tolikara Regency, Papua was allegedly supplying money and arms to armed groups under Free Papua Movement. The party denied such allegations and said that if proven, they are ready to fire the accused from the party.

== Political identities ==
=== Ideology ===
The 2008 Law on Political Parties states that political parties are allowed to include specific characteristics that reflect their political aspirations, as long as they do not contradict Pancasila and the 1945 Constitution. As per Articles 3 and 4 in its constitution and bylaws (AD/ART), NasDem is founded on Pancasila and identifies itself as the "Movement for the Restoration of Indonesia". Outsider views on the party's political orientation vary. Academic and domestic observers classified NasDem as a nationalist party, while their international counterparts described it as a secular-nationalist party.

=== Party platform ===
According to its articles of association (AD/ART), the party aims to establish a democratic, just, and sovereign society. The party's foundation lies in nationalism with three objectives: achieving national independence, economic sovereignty, and cultural dignity. According to the party website, the party's policies are to:

- Fulfill the needs of the people
- Reject democracy that merely complicates governance without bringing about general prosperity and that only leads to power routinely changing hands without producing quality leaders that set an example.
- Build a mature democracy
- Build a democracy based on strong people who are called on to bring about a bright future
- Restore the ideals of the Indonesian Republic.
- Support the constitutional mandate to build a prosperous nation based on the principles of economic democracy, a law-based state that holds human rights in high regard, and a nation that recognizes diversity
- Bring about a nation that is just, prosperous and sovereign through a Movement for Change to Restore Indonesia.

=== Cadre training ===
Unlike most political parties in Indonesia which relied on informal training programs for the cadre specialized education and training, the NasDem Party owned its own formalized, advanced and specialized cadre education and training facility named Akademi Bela Negara Nasional Demokrat (English: National Defense Academy of National Democrats), or colloquially called ABN NasDem. ABN NasDem is a political corporate university, and it was the only kind in Indonesia. ABN NasDem institution and courses modeled after Indonesia primary national leadership education and training facility, National Resilience Institute (Indonesian: Lembaga Ketahanan Nasional). The academy founded by Surya Paloh and IGK Manila. The academy was inaugurated by Joko Widodo on 16 July 2017. The training materials were condensed into 48 credits for 4 months. It does not issue any degree.

Following NasDem's move, several Indonesian parties formalized their political cadre training programs into functioning political corporate university. As of 2023, several political corporate universities have been established: PDIP Party School (PDIP), Gerindra Party Cadre School (Gerindra), Demokrat Academy (Demokrat), and Golkar Institute (Golkar).

== Leaders ==
No.	Name	Constituency / title	Term of office		Image	Election results
No.	Name	Constituency / title	Took office	Left office	Image	Election results
Split from: Golkar Party (Paloh's faction)
General Chairmen of the NasDem Party (2011–present)
1	Patrice Rio Capella (born 1969)	—	23 June 2011	25 January 2013		
2	Surya Paloh (born 1951)	—	25 January 2013	Incumbent		2013 Unopposed 2019 Unopposed 2024 Unopposed

== Controversy ==
On 17 May 2023, the Secretary General of the NasDem Party, Johnny G. Plate was named a suspect in the corruption case of the 4G BTS Infrastructure project in frontier, outermost, and disadvantaged areas (Indonesian: Daerah 3T: Terdepan, Terluar, Tertinggal) which was estimated to result in state losses of more than IDR 8 trillion.

In August 2025, two members of the DPR RI from the NasDem Party, Ahmad Sahroni and Nafa Urbach, sparked controversy during the large protests against the contentious allowance for DPR members. Sahroni faced backlash for labelling those who wished to disband the DPR as "orang tolol sedunia" (the world's stupidest people), while Urbach drew criticism for complaining about the traffic congestion she encountered on her way to the DPR building. Both later issued apologies; Sahroni, who was in Singapore at the time, refused to return to Indonesia for his own safety. On 30 August, enraged crowds vandalised and looted Sahroni's home. The following day, in response to public outrage, the NasDem Party dismissed both Sahroni and Urbach from their positions in the DPR RI.

== Election results ==
=== Legislative election results ===
Election	Ballot number	Leader	Total seats won	Seat change	Total votes	Share of votes	Outcome of election
2014	1	Surya Paloh	35 / 560		8,402,812	6.72%	Governing coalition
2019	5	Surya Paloh	59 / 575	▲23	12,661,792	9.05%	Governing coalition
2024	5	Surya Paloh	69 / 580	▲10	14,660,328	9.66%	Coalition supply

=== Presidential election results ===
Election	Ballot number	Candidate	Running mate	1st round (total votes)	Share of votes	Outcome	2nd round (total votes)	Share of votes	Outcome
2014	2	Joko Widodo	Jusuf Kalla	70,997,833	53.15%	Elected			
2019	1	Joko Widodo	Ma'ruf Amin	85,607,362	55.50%	Elected			
2024	1	Anies Baswedan	Muhaimin Iskandar	40,971,906	24.95%	Lost			

Note: Bold text indicates the party member
