= Bandar Lampung =

Capital and largest city of Lampung, Indonesia

Bandar Lampung Tanjungkarang–Telukbetung
- City
- City of Bandar Lampung; Kota Bandar Lampung
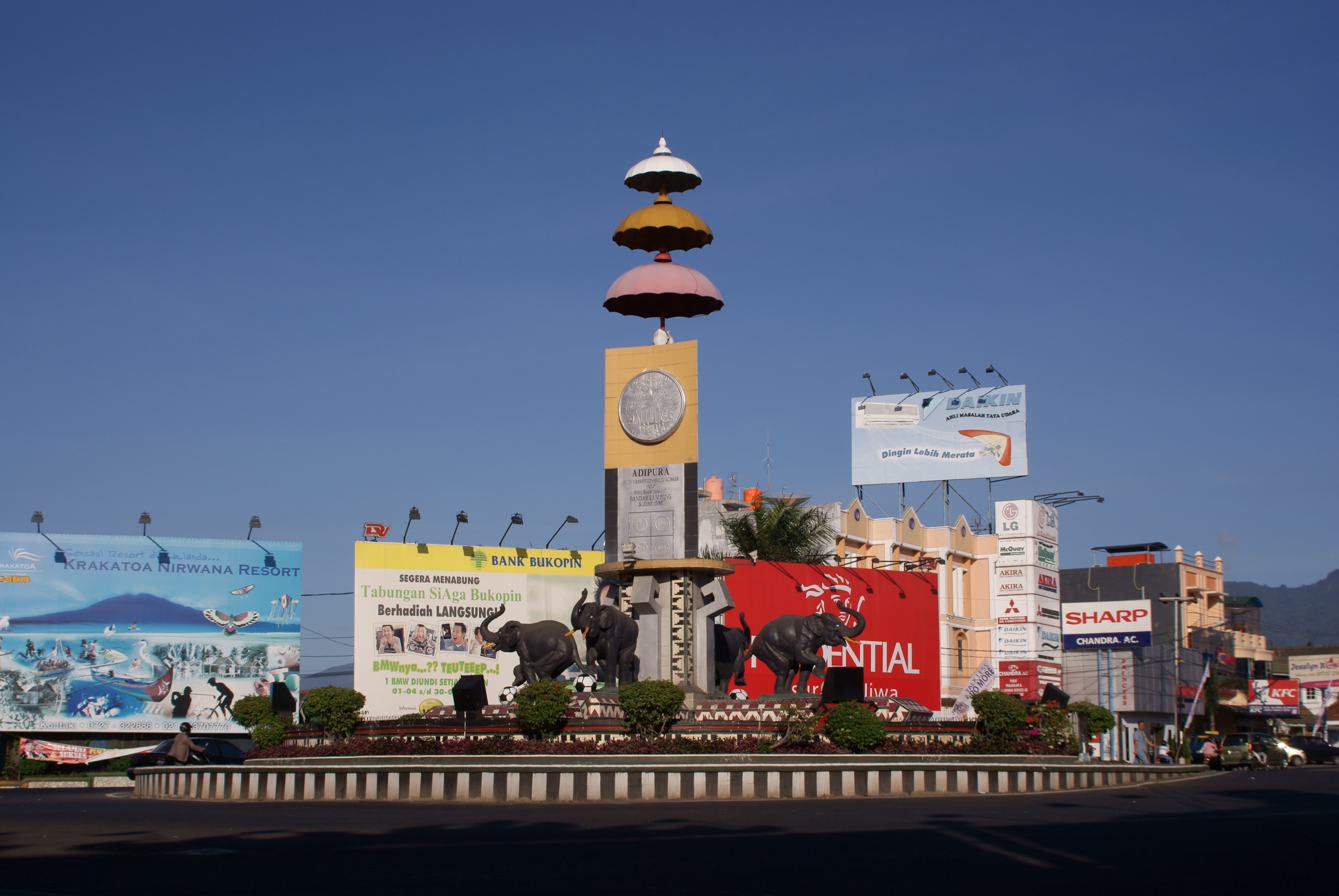
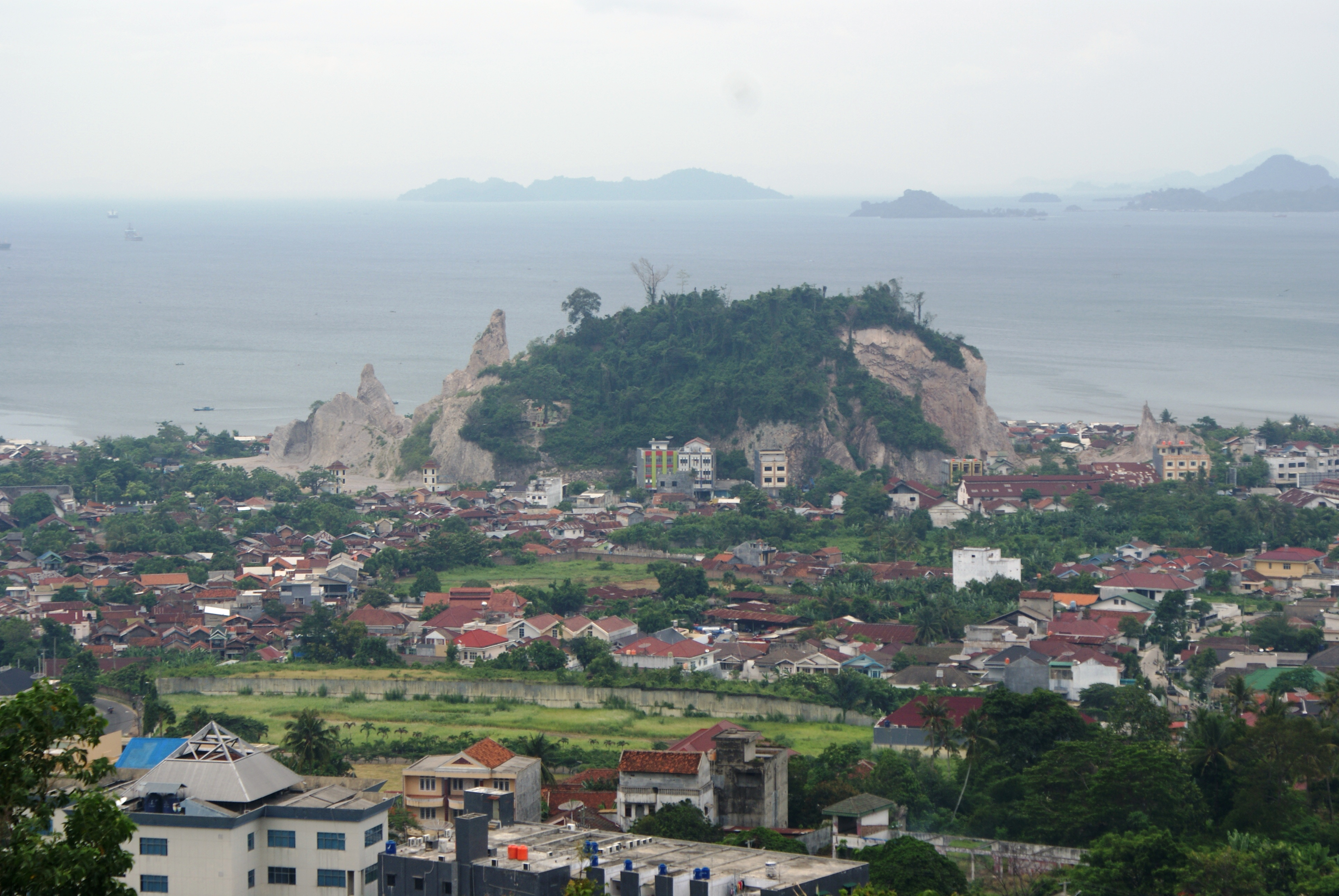
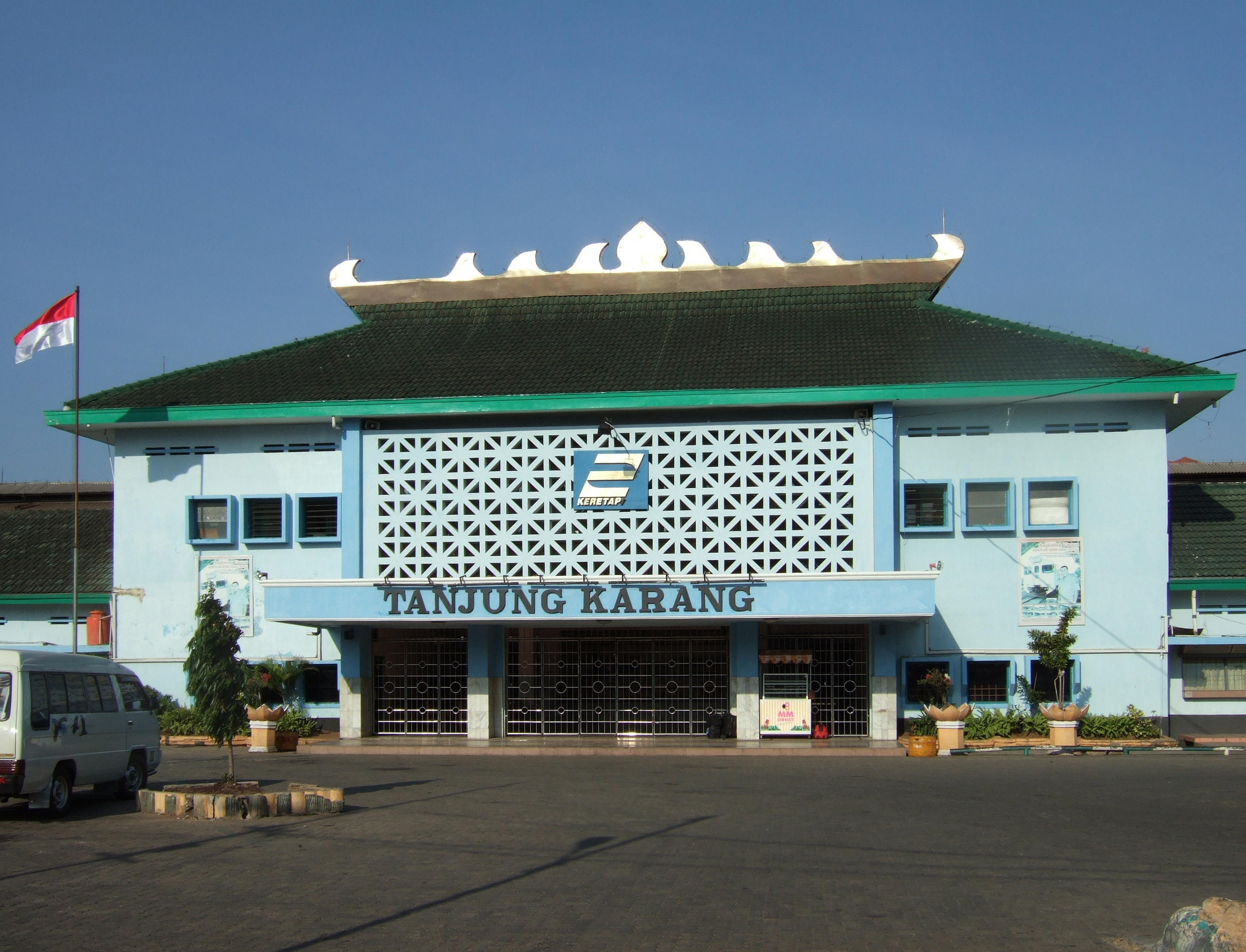
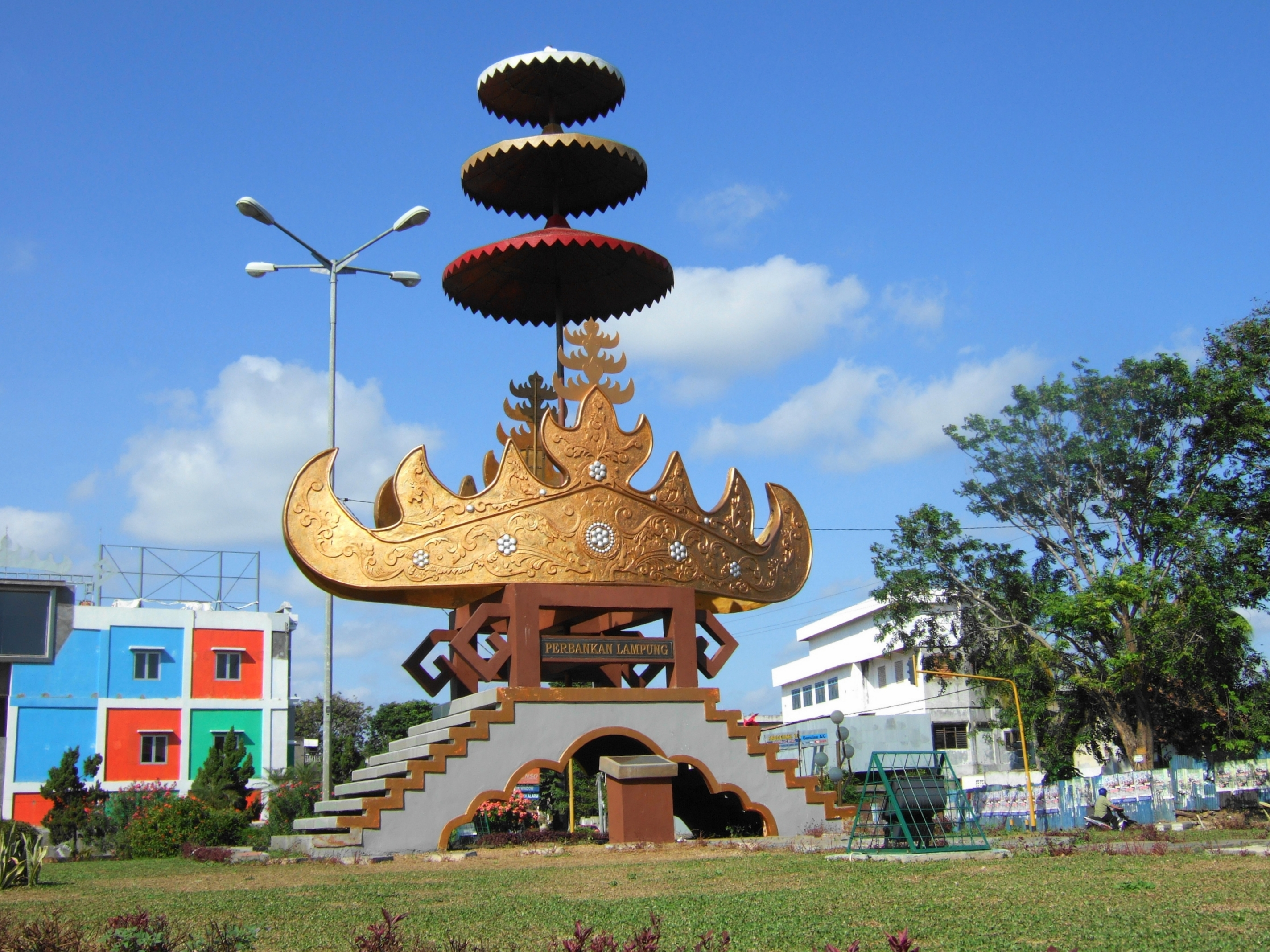
- Adipura Monument Aerial view of Southern Bandar Lampung Tanjung Karang Station Grand Mercure Hotel Siger Monument

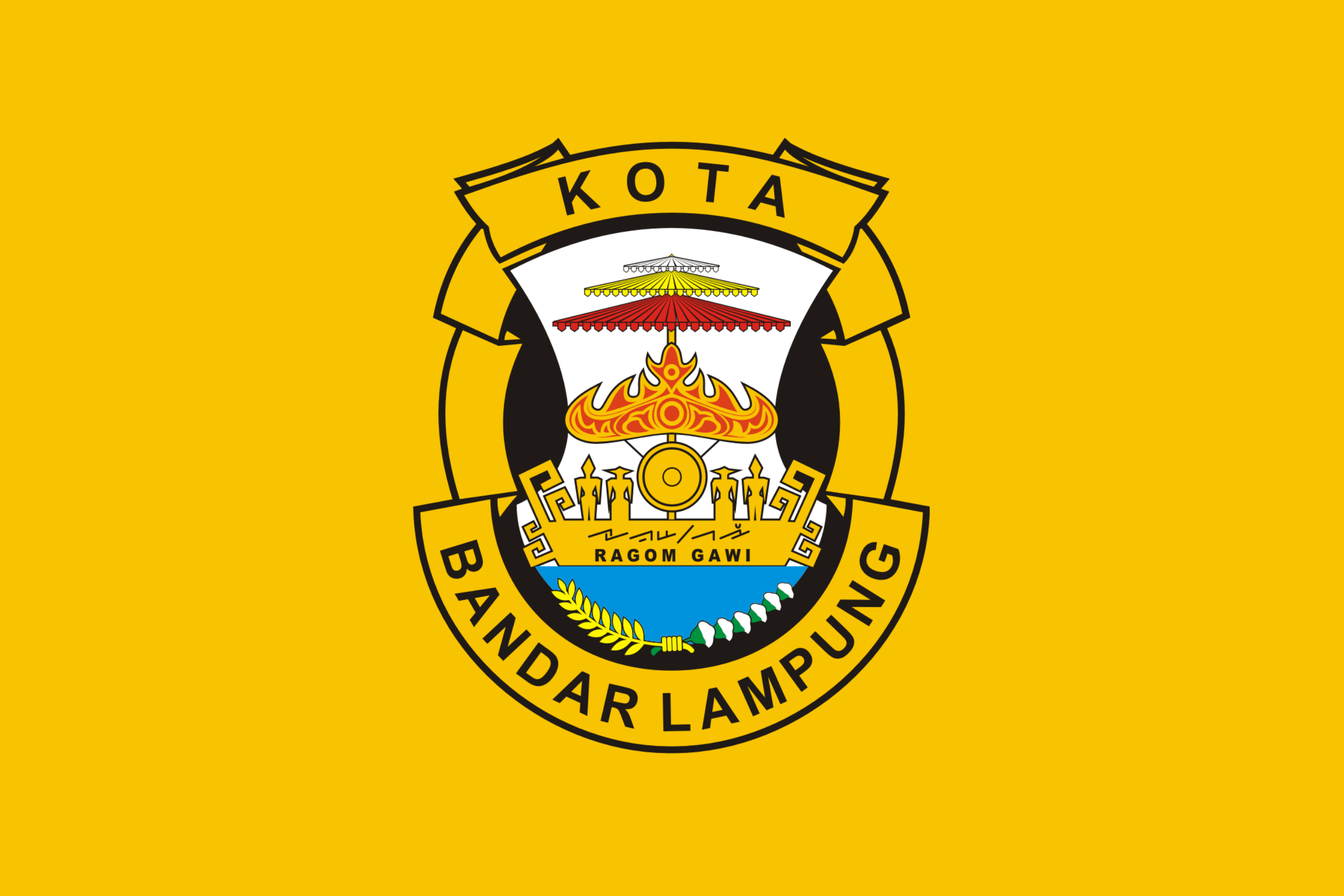
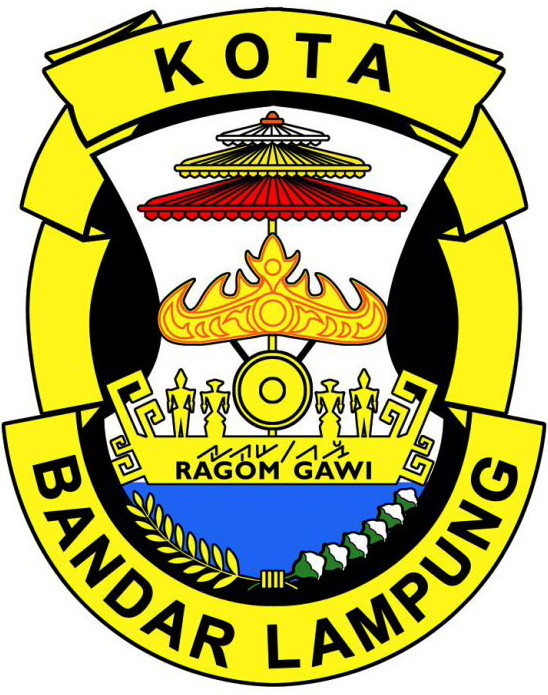
- Flag Coat of arms
- Nickname(s): Kota Kain Tapis "City of Tapis"
- Motto: Ragom Gawi (Lampung Api) "Language and Culture"
- Location within Lampung

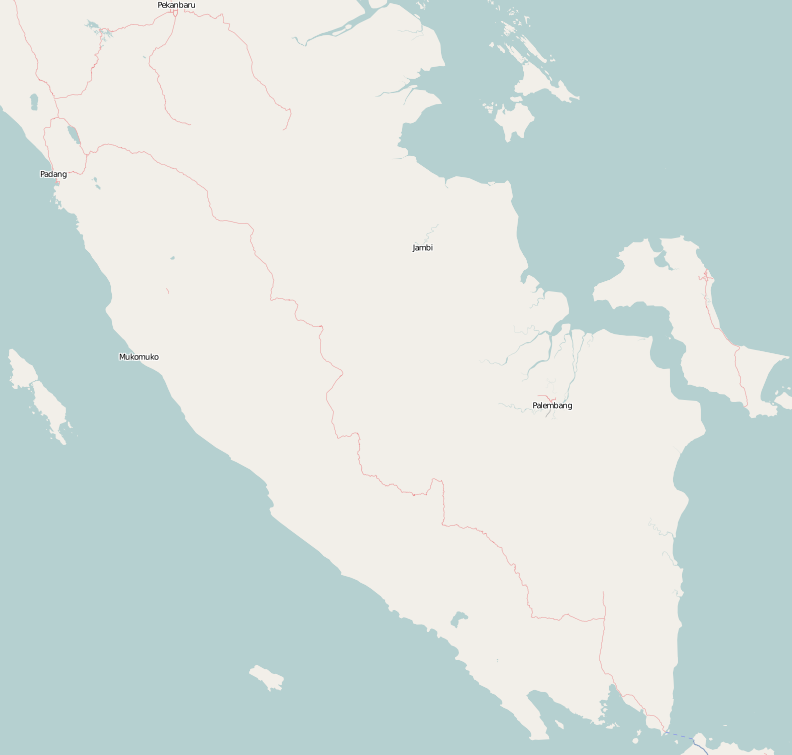
- Location in Southern Sumatra Location in Sumatra Location in Indonesia
- Coordinates: 5°27′0″S 105°16′0″E
- Country: Indonesia
- Province: Lampung
- Founded: 17 June 1682

Government
  - Type: Mayor–council
  - Body: Bandar Lampung City Government
  - Mayor: Eva Dwiana (PDI-P)
  - Vice Mayor: Deddy Amrullah
  - Legislature: Bandar Lampung City Regional House of Representatives (DPRD)

Area
  - City: 183.77 km^{2} (70.95 sq mi)
- Elevation: 15 m (49 ft)

Population (mid 2025 estimate)
  - City: 1,088,200
  - Density: 5,921.5/km^{2} (15,337/sq mi)
  - Metro: 1,600,000

Human Development Index
  - HDI (2023): ▲0.798 (2023); High
- Time zone: UTC+7 (Indonesia Western Time)
- Postcodes: 35111 to 35246
- Area code: (+62) 721
- Website: bandarlampungkota.go.id

Bandar Lampung (/ˈbɑːndɑː ˈlæmpʌŋ/ BUN-dar-LUM-pung; Indonesian: Kota Bandar Lampung; Lampung: Kutak Bandarlampung; and formerly Dutch: Oosthaven, lit. 'Eastern Harbor') is the capital and largest city of the Indonesian province of Lampung. Located on the southern tip of Sumatra, Bandar Lampung was originally called Tanjungkarang–Telukbetung, since it was a unification of two major settlements in Lampung, before being renamed in 1983.

The city proper, together with South Lampung Regency (which borders the city on its northern and eastern sides) and Pesawaran Regency (which borders it on its western side), are major transmigration recipients. The city's area is about 183.77 km^{2}. It had a census population of 881,801 in 2010 and 1,166,066 in 2020; the official estimate as of mid 2025 was 1,088,200 (comprising 548,900 males and 539,300 females).

== History ==
Bandar Lampung is the capital city of Lampung Province. Before this city was named as Bandar Lampung, the city was named Tanjung Karang–Teluk Betung. It was a combination of the two twin cities of Tanjung Karang and Teluk Betung; the two twin cities were previously part of South Lampung Regency. This naming is because the city of Bandar Lampung consisted of the city of Tanjung Karang and the city of Teluk Betung. In 1982, there was an expansion of the territory with the inclusion of three new districts.

=== Early history ===
A report by the Banten regent William Craft to Governor-General Cornelis Speelman states that, on the basis of a description provided by Pangeran Aria Dipati Ningrat on 17 June 1682, "Lampung-Telokbetong at the edge of the sea is the seat of power of a Dipati Temenggung Nata Negara, with power over three thousand people". This date would later be adopted by the city administration as its official founding date.

=== Dutch East Indies ===
The coat of arms of Lampung during the Dutch colonial era, adopted in the 1920s

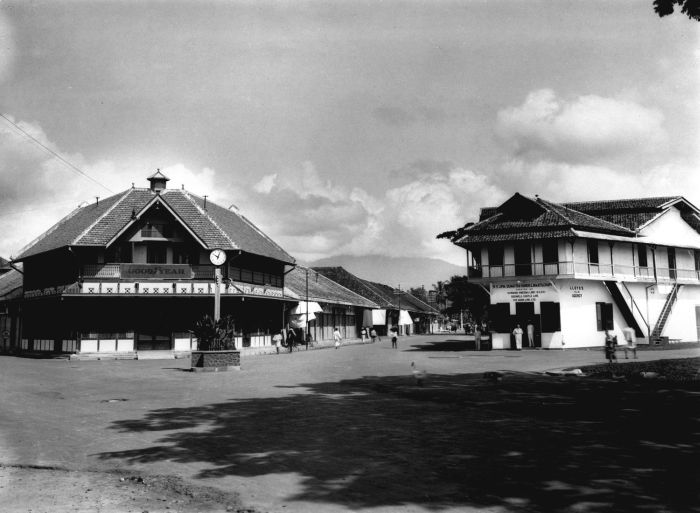
Teluk Betung in the 1930s

Under the Dutch colonial administration, 1912 Staatsblad 462 codified the city as being part and parcel of the Onderafdeling Telokbetong, composed of present-day Teluk Betung and its environs. The Onderafdeling's capital was Tanjung Karang, while Teluk Betung itself served as the seat of government for the Karesidenan Lampung.

=== Under Japanese occupation ===
In addition, during the Japanese colonial era, present-day Bandar Lampung was administered as a city, led by a Japanese mayor, who was assisted by an Indonesian deputy mayor (副市長, fuku-shicho).

=== Post-independence ===
After Indonesian independence in 1945, Tanjung Karang and Teluk Betung initially fell under the jurisdiction of South Lampung Regency, until a 1948 law consolidated the two and elevated them to independent city status.

== Geography ==
Bandar Lampung, formerly Tanjungkarang-Telukbetung, the capital of Lampung Province, Indonesia, lies at the head of Lampung Bay on the south coast of the island of Sumatra. Bandar Lampung was created in the 1980s from the amalgamation of the former provincial capital, Tanjungkarang, with the port of Telukbetung. The city's cottage industries include metalworking, hand-weaving, and pottery and tile making. With air, road, and rail connections. Bandar Lampung is the chief port and transportation center for the surrounding agricultural area, which produces rubber, tea, coffee, and pepper for export.

== Administrative districts ==
District divisions of Bandar Lampung

At the time of the 2010 census, the city of Bandar Lampung was divided into thirteen administrative districts (Indonesian: kecamatan), but subsequently seven additional districts were created by the splitting of existing districts, bringing the total to twenty districts. The new districts are Bumi Waras, Enggal, Kedamaian, Labuhan Ratu, Langkapura, Teluk Betung Timur (East Teluk Betung) and Way Halim.

The twenty districts are tabulated below with their areas and their populations at the 2010 census and the 2020 census; together with the official estimates as of mid 2025. The table also includes the location of the district administrative centres, the number of administrative villages (all classed as urban kelurahan) in each district and its postal codes.

Area code (kode wilayah)	Name of district (kecamatan)	Area in km^{2}	Pop'n census 2010	Pop'n census 2020	Pop'n estim. mid 2025	Admin centre	No. of kelu- rahan	Postal codes
18.71.08	Teluk Betung Barat (West Teluk Betung)	18.26	59,396	41,096	39,000	Bakung	5	35232 - 35239
18.71.19	Teluk Betung Timur (East Teluk Betung)	10.39	^{(a)}	53,874	49,300	Sukamaju	6	35231 - 35237
18.71.07	Teluk Betung Selatan (South Teluk Betung)	3.49	92,156	42,870	38,100	Gedong Pakuon	6	35211 - 35229
18.71.20	Bumi Waras	4.52	^{(a)}	63,166	56,400	Sukaraja	5	35224 - 35228
18.71.04	Panjang	13.64	63,504	80,811	72,000	Karang Maritim	8	35241 - 35246
18.71.05	Tanjung Karang Timur (East Tanjung Karang)	2.07	89,324	43,076	37,200	Kota Baru	8	35121 - 35126
18.71.18	Kedamaian	8.34	^{(a)}	57,905	52,700	Kedamaian	8	35122 - 35133
18.71.09	Teluk Betung Utara (North Teluk Betung)	4.38	62,663	53,552	49,100	Kupang Kota	6	35211 - 35215
18.71.06	Tanjung Karang Pusat (Central Tanjung Karang)	3.50	72,385	55,925	49,000	Palapa	7	35111 - 35119
18.71.17	Enggal	2.78	^{(a)}	28,649	24,600	Enggal	6	35111 - 35127
18.71.03	Tanjung Karang Barat (West Tanjung Karang)	11.54	63,747	65,554	62,200	Gedong Air	7	35151 - 35159
18.71.13	Kemiling	21.33	71,471	88,574	87,700	Beringin Jaya	9	35153 - 35158
18.71.16	Langkapura	5.30	^{(a)}	43,569	43,900	Langkapura	5	35152 - 35157
18.71.01	Kedaton	3.77	88,314	57,336	51,300	Kedaton	7	35141 - 35148
18.71.10	Rajabasa	12.93	43,257	57,589	56,700	Rajabasa Nunyai	7	35144 - 35145
18.71.11	Tanjung Senang	9.24	41,225	62,168	63,100	Tanjung Senang	5	35141 - 35143
18.71.14	Labuhan Ratu	6.10	^{(a)}	52,393	47,800	Kampung Baru Raya	6	35142 - 35149
18.71.02	Sukarame	10.92	70,761	67,725	67,700	Sukarame	6	35131
18.71.12	Sukabumi	25.04	63,598	75,870	73,700	Sukabumi	7	35122 - 35245
18.71.15	Way Halim	6.25	^{(a)}	74,364	66,900	Way Halim Permai	6	35123 - 35141
	Total city	183.77	881,801	1,166,066	1,088,200		126	

Note: (a) the 2010 population of this new district is included in the figures for the district(s) from which it was separated.

== Demographics ==
Ethnicities of Bandar Lampung
Ethnic group	Percentage
Javanese	40.68%
Lampungese	15.84%
Sundanese	12.00%
Palembangese	10.34%
Bantenese	7.79%
Chinese	3.38%
Minangkabau	3.36%
Batak	2.29%
Others	4.32%

Bandar Lampung is the fifth-largest city in the region of Sumatra, after Medan, Palembang, Batam and Pekanbaru. The city's population of 790,057 in 2005; 881,801 in 2010, 977,686 in 2015 and 1,166,066 in 2020; the official estimate as of mid 2025 was 1,088,200, giving a drop of nearly 78,000 from the figure at the 2020 Census as the urban area has outgrown the city boundaries.

The dominant ethnic groups in Bandar Lampung are Javanese, primarily composed of the descendants of people transported from Java in the early 20th century by the Dutch and the transmigration program of the New Order regime. The Lampungese are natives of the city, having lived as peddlers and fishermen in the outskirts of the city. The other major ethnic groups are Sundanese and Bantenese who originate from across the strait. This city is the largest population of Sundanese and Bantenese outside of West Java who have lived since the Banten Sultanate era. Chinese and Minangkabau who each amount to around 3.3% of the city's population are mostly concentrated around the city center and near the markets.

== Climate ==
Bandar Lampung has a tropical rainforest climate (Af) with heavy rainfall year-round. Rain gets noticeably heavier from November to April.

Climate data for Bandar Lampung
Month	Jan	Feb	Mar	Apr	May	Jun	Jul	Aug	Sep	Oct	Nov	Dec	Year
Mean daily maximum °C (°F)	30.3 (86.5)	31.0 (87.8)	31.6 (88.9)	32.0 (89.6)	31.9 (89.4)	31.7 (89.1)	31.3 (88.3)	31.4 (88.5)	31.4 (88.5)	32.0 (89.6)	32.0 (89.6)	31.1 (88.0)	31.5 (88.7)
Daily mean °C (°F)	26.4 (79.5)	26.7 (80.1)	27.2 (81.0)	27.3 (81.1)	27.2 (81.0)	26.8 (80.2)	26.6 (79.9)	26.6 (79.9)	26.7 (80.1)	27.2 (81.0)	27.3 (81.1)	26.9 (80.4)	26.9 (80.4)
Mean daily minimum °C (°F)	22.6 (72.7)	22.5 (72.5)	22.8 (73.0)	22.7 (72.9)	22.5 (72.5)	22.0 (71.6)	21.9 (71.4)	21.8 (71.2)	22.1 (71.8)	22.4 (72.3)	22.7 (72.9)	22.7 (72.9)	22.4 (72.3)
Average precipitation mm (inches)	280 (11.0)	281 (11.1)	255 (10.0)	175 (6.9)	135 (5.3)	119 (4.7)	100 (3.9)	121 (4.8)	118 (4.6)	139 (5.5)	149 (5.9)	250 (9.8)	2,122 (83.5)

== Economy ==
Plaza Lotus was a former shopping centre on Jalan Raden Intan in Bandar Lampung. The mall closed and demolition of the complex began in 2023.

== Transportation ==
=== Air ===
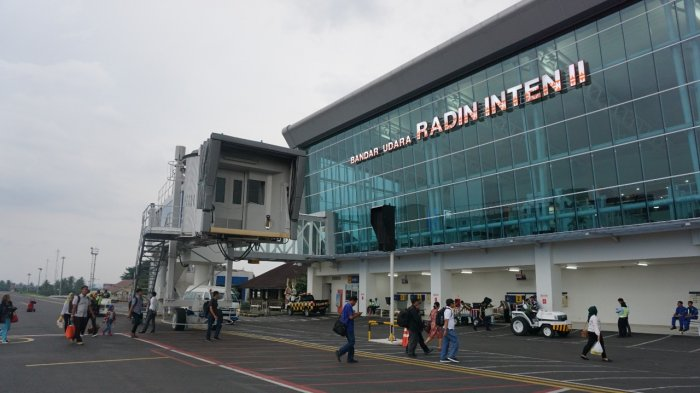
Radin Inten 2 Airport Terminal

Bandar Lampung is served by Radin Inten II Airport (TKG), in the neighbouring county of South Lampung. The airport can be accessed by public transportation, such as bus and mini bus.

=== Road transport ===
Bandar Lampung has several road transportation alternatives. The most popular is a minibus called angkot, an abbreviation from Angkutan Kota (literally translated as 'City Transportation'). They serve routes throughout the city, operated privately and cheaply. Usually, an angkot covers some area between Tanjung Karang (the heart of Bandar Lampung) and an urban area. Currently, routes covered are Tanjung Karang – Garuntang, Tanjung Karang – Teluk Betung, Tanjung Karang – Rajabasa, Tanjung Karang – Sukarame, Tanjung Karang – Langkapura and more.

Bandarlampung Transportation Office has announced that in October 2011 it will serve two of the seven routes planned by bus rapid transit—the Rajabasa-Sukaraja and Sukaraja-Korpri housing complexes in Sukarame.

=== Rail transport ===
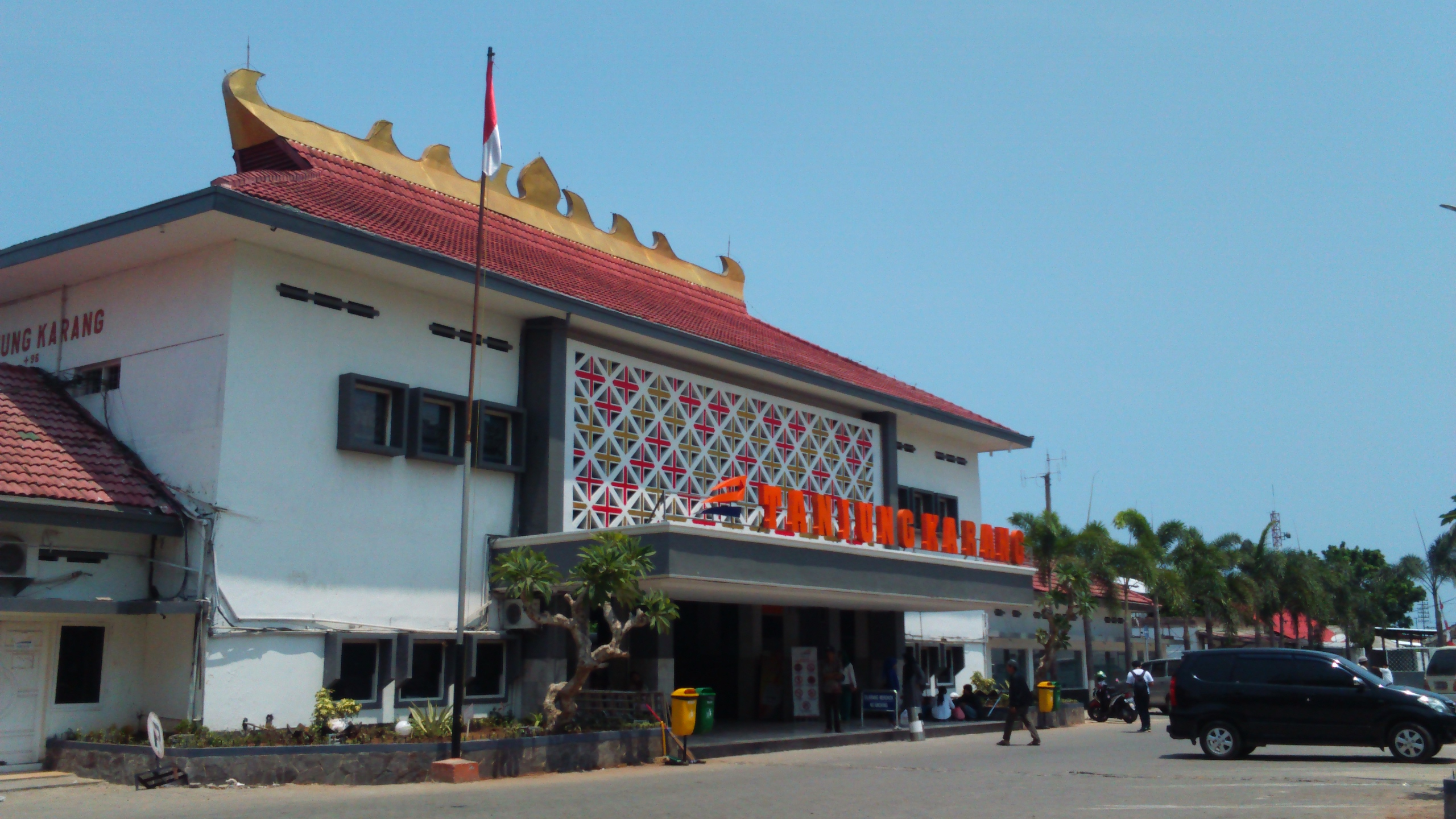
Tanjung Karang Station in 2015

Tanjung Karang Station in Bandar Lampung is the terminus of the railway service from Palembang, although the railway track continues all the way until Panjang harbor and Tarahan coal offloading point. There are many express trains connecting Bandar Lampung and Palembang, including the Limex Sriwijaya and Rajabasa Express.

== Media ==
The oldest newspaper in the Lampung region is Lampung Post, part of Media Group. Several other newspapers, such as Tribun Lampung and Radar Lampung are also available.

The privately owned Radar Lampung TV and Tegar TV are the local TV stations based in Bandar Lampung. The public TVRI Lampung also covers the city.

== Education ==
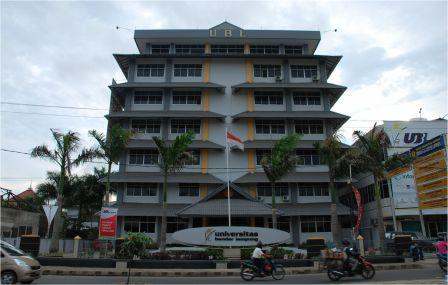
Bandar Lampung University, Campus A

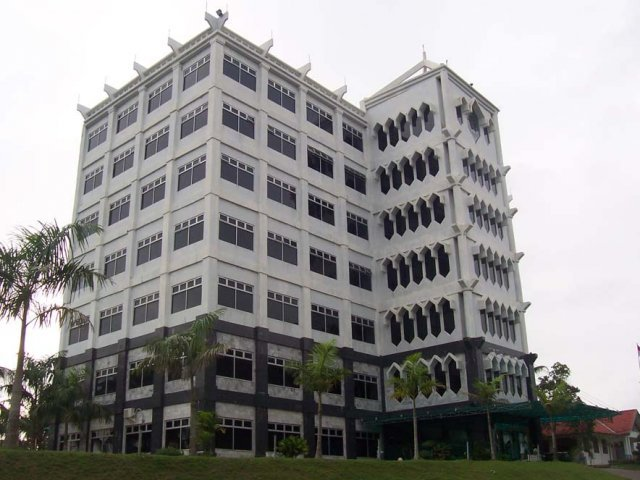
Malahayati University, Old Rectorate

In 2009, Bandar Lampung had a literacy rate of 94.3%, slightly increased from 2005, which was 93.5%. However, the high school participation rate kept decreasing, from 69.2% (2007) to 61.4% (2009). On the other hand, the high school participation rate in Indonesia rose from 54.6% in 2007 to 55.8% in 2010.

There are some notable high schools and universities in Bandar Lampung, such as SMP Negeri 2 Bandar Lampung (public), SMP Negeri 1 Bandar Lampung (public), SMA Negeri 2 Bandar Lampung (public, known as Smanda), SMA Negeri 9 Bandar Lampung (public, known as Smalan), SMA Negeri 1 Bandar Lampung (public, known as Smansa), SMA Al-Kautsar Bandar Lampung (private), SMA Fransiskus Bandar Lampung (private), SMP Xaverius 4 (private Catholic junior high school, locally known as Xaveway), SMA Xaverius Pahoman (a Catholic private school teaching students from middle school to high school, locally known as Xavepa), Lampung University (public, locally known as Unila), Bandar Lampung University (private, locally known as UBL: Universitas Bandar Lampung), Muhammadiyah University of Lampung (known as UML: Universitas Muhammadiyah Lampung and Malahayati University (private). In March 2011, Unila already had 70,866 alumni.

== Sister cities ==
Bandar Lampung is twinned with:

- Liwa, Indonesia
- Kuantan, Malaysia
- Ipoh, Malaysia
- Seberang Perai, Malaysia
- Split, Croatia (Proposed)

== See also ==
- List of twin towns and sister cities in Indonesia
