= Dalton Tanonaka =

American television executive (born 1954)

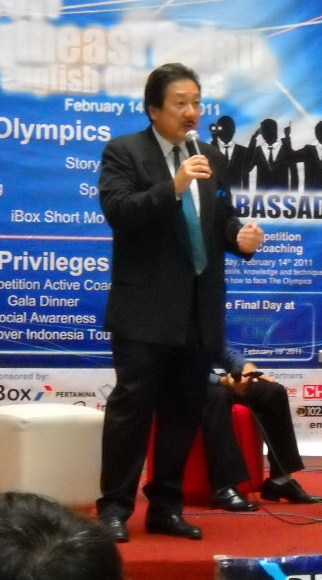
- Born: Dalton Ichiro Tanonaka; June 13, 1954 (age 72); Kohala, Hawaii, United States
- Citizenship: United States
- Education: Colorado Mesa University, Northern Illinois University
- Occupation: CEO of The Indonesia Channel (2014–present)
- Years active: 1978–present
- Known for: News anchor

Dalton Ichiro Tanonaka (born June 13, 1954) is an American television executive. He has spent most of his career in Asia, receiving several international and US. awards for his journalism work. Tanonaka is also known for his community service, providing scholarships to deserving students and speaking at schools and universities.

== Early life and education ==
Tanonaka was born in Kohala, Hawaii, not far from the original statue of King Kamehameha I. He was raised in Honolulu on the island of Oahu, attending public schools through his graduation from Kalani High School, where he played football and soccer. After working as a tour escort to "grow up" and save money, Tanonaka graduated from Mesa College (now Colorado Mesa University) in Grand Junction, Colorado, in 1976 with an Associate in Arts degree, and Northern Illinois University in DeKalb, Illinois, in 1977 with a Bachelor of Science degree in journalism.

== Career ==
After TV and newspaper jobs at the ABC and NBC affiliates in Honolulu and the Honolulu Advertiser, Tanonaka was recruited by Japan's public broadcaster NHK in 1990. He helped launch and was the anchor of "Japan Business Today", an internationally distributed daily program from Tokyo. After the NHK project ended in 1994, Tanonaka joined the launch team of the U.S. business channel CNBC in Asia. From regional headquarters in Chai Wan, Hong Kong, Tanonaka anchored daily news and feature programs including "The NBC Asia Evening News" and "Money, Money, Money".

When the operations of CNBC Asia was moved to Singapore in 1998, Tanonaka returned to Hawaii for a brief period. He was appointed Honolulu's director of economic development, where he served until resuming his journalism career in 1999. CNN International recruited him to its Asia headquarters in Hong Kong, where he anchored programs including "BizAsia", "Asia Tonight", and "TalkAsia".

Following the September 11, 2001 attacks in the U.S., Tanonaka asked to be released from his CNN contract and returned to Hawaii to make an attempt at public service. In 2002, he ran unsuccessfully for the Republican nomination for Lieutenant Governor of Hawaii, finishing second behind former Circuit Court judge Duke Aiona. Following a brief period as president of the Pacific Basin Economic Council (PBEC) based in Honolulu, Tanonaka ran unsuccessfully for the United States House of Representatives in 2004. During this campaign, allegations of illegalities were made by political opponents. Tanonaka cooperated with authorities, but after agreeing to plead guilty to technical violations, U.S. District Judge Helen Gillmor ordered him to spend 90 days in the Honolulu Federal Detention Center to "send a message" to the public.

In 2006, Tanonaka joined Indonesia's first 24-hour news channel MetroTV in Jakarta. He was tasked with creating a new international-standard English program for global distribution. "Indonesia Now" debuted in September 2006, and is seen on international networks such as Japan's NHK as well as live-streamed on the Internet at www.metrotvnews.com.

In 2010, Tanonaka teamed up with actress Rahayu "Sara" Saraswati for the weekly dialogue program "TalkIndonesia". In 2011, he created "ASEAN Today", a monthly program done in partnership with the Association of Southeast Asian Nations (ASEAN) Secretariat. Tanonaka was a regular columnist in the Jakarta Post "Weekender" magazine from its debut in 2007, moving to the Jakarta Globe in 2010. In January 2014, Tanonaka became CEO of "The Indonesia Channel," the country's first 24-hour all-English channel for global distribution.

== Humanitarian work and activism ==
Training professional journalists has been a regular part of Tanonaka's career. Under a program coordinated by the Asia-Pacific Institute for Broadcasting Development (AIBD), he has travelled to Iran, Pakistan and Mauritius to hold workshops in broadcasting standards and skills. The Tanonaka International Journalism Scholarship was named for Tanonaka's father Thomas, and given to deserving university students in Indonesia. Winners were handed cash grants and received living stipends in cities such as Yogyakarta, Lampung, and Jakarta, the most recent in June 2013. As a member of the Asian American Journalists Association (AAJA), Tanonaka created and initially endowed the AAJA Minoru Yasui Memorial Scholarship in memory of the late civil rights advocate. It was first awarded in 1993 to promising male broadcast students to support and motivate interest in the field.

Tanonaka has also been involved in a variety of other charitable activities in Indonesia. In December 2006, he was the co-creator of the "Beat The Bird Flu Concert" in Jakarta, Indonesia, to spotlight prevention measures of the deadly virus. He secured MetroTV's commitment in airing public service announcements and a concert special. An ongoing environmental disaster in Sidoarjo, East Java prompted Tanonaka and friend Ron Mullers to hold a fund-raising event in 2007 for victims of an unstoppable mudflow that wiped out homes and businesses. After raising nearly $10,000 with the participation of Tanonaka's rock'n'roll band, the men went personally to the mudflow site to personally hand out packets of money directly to affected residents. Finally, to develop and promote Indonesian artists, Tanonaka created "The Mister Moonlight Show" in 2009, a live music event with Indonesian musicians and singers for five-star hotel venues. It is now in its fourth year.

Tanonaka and Mullers led a community drive to erect a statue of a young Barack Obama in a park near the U.S. president's childhood home in Jakarta, Indonesia. It was unveiled in December 2009, and moved to its permanent location at Obama's elementary school in February 2010.

== Controversies ==
Tanonaka was arrested at his apartment in Jakarta on October 7, 2020, by officials from the Attorney General’s Office. Dalton is reportedly a convicted felon in a fraud case involving USD 500,000, or more than Rp 7 billion. The case against Tanonaka dates back to 2014.

He was acquitted a few weeks later, on November 3, 2020.

== Books ==
Tanonaka is the author of four books, compilations of his newspaper columns chronicling his time in various parts of the world:

- Tanonaka in Tokyo: a whimsical look at life and love in Japan. Honolulu Dolphin Works. 1993. OCLC 29413282.
- Tanonaka in Tokyo II: contemporary slices of Japanese life and love. Honolulu Dolphin Works. 1994. OCLC 40178468.
- Dateline Tanonaka : from island life to the new Suzie Wong. Honolulu Dolphin Works. 1996. OCLC 38502066.
- Dalton's Sambal Adventures. Jakarta Post Publishing. 2009.

== Awards and honors ==
- Winner, Bhakti Karya Nusantara Award 2010 (for contributions to Indonesia), Bali, Indonesia, December 2010
- Winner, PuriAgungSingaraja Award 2009 (for contributions to art and culture), Bali, Indonesia, November 2009
- Winner, Raja Ida Tjokorda Denpasar IX Award (for service to Indonesia), Bali, Indonesia, December 2007
- Best Newspaper Columnist, Society of Professional Journalists (SPJ) Awards, Hawaii, United States, June 2000
- Best News Anchor, Asian Television Awards, Singapore, January 1998
- Member of the Year, Asian American Journalists Association, Boston, United States, August 1997
