= Lampung Post =

Indonesian daily newspaper published in Bandar Lampung

- Teruji Tepercaya (Tested, Trusted)
- Type: Daily newspaper
- Format: Broadsheet
- Owner: PT Masa Kini Mandiri (Media Group)
- Founder: H. Solfian Akhmad
- President: Abdul Kohar
- Founded: August 10, 1974; 51 years ago
- Language: Indonesian
- Headquarters: Jalan Soekarno Hatta No. 108 Rajabasa, Bandar Lampung, Lampung
- City: Bandar Lampung
- Country: Indonesia
- Sister newspapers: Media Indonesia
- ISSN: 0852-6524
- Website: lampungpost.id lampost.co (online portal)

Lampung Post is a daily newspaper in Indonesia published in Bandar Lampung, Lampung. The newspaper is first published on 10 August 1974 and published by PT Masa Kini Mandiri, a Media Group subsidiary.

Lampung Post was founded by H. Solfian Akhmad, originally published by PT Masa Kini. It went into publication based on press license and Ministry of Information decree in 1974. In 1986, the ownership passed to newly established PT Masa Kini Mandiri as the new license was updated. The newspaper went online by launching Lampungpost.com portal in 2006, in 2014 the website address changed to Lampost.co. Another website Lampungpost.id serves as the digital version of the paper.
