= List of twin towns and sister cities in Indonesia =

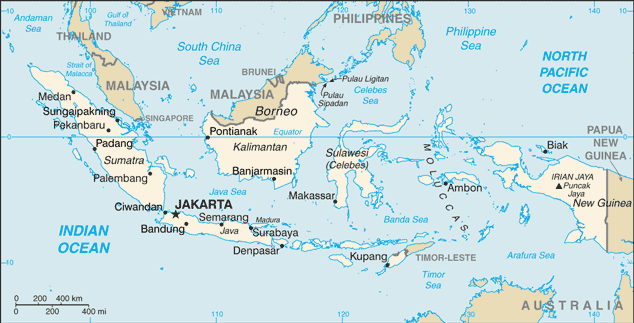
Map of Indonesia

This is a list of places in Indonesia having standing links to local communities in other countries. In most cases, the association, especially when formalised by local government, is known as "town twinning" (usually in Europe) or "sister cities" (usually in the rest of the world).

== A ==
Ambon

- Darwin, Australia
- Vlissingen, Netherlands

== B ==
Banda Aceh

- Pendik, Turkey
- Samarkand, Uzbekistan

Bandung

- Braunschweig, Germany
- Cotabato City, Philippines
- Cuenca, Ecuador
- Fort Worth, United States
- Liuzhou, China
- Namur, Belgium
- Petaling Jaya, Malaysia
- Suwon, South Korea
- Yingkou, China

Binjai

- Nan'an, China

Bitung

- Davao City, Philippines

Bogor

- Gödöllő, Hungary
- Nanning, China
- St. Louis, United States

Bukittinggi

- Seremban, Malaysia

== D ==
Denpasar

- Asenovgrad, Bulgaria
- Mossel Bay, South Africa
- Spassky District, Russia

Depok

- Ōsaki, Japan

== J ==
Jakarta

- Bangkok, Thailand
- Beijing, China
- Berlin, Germany
- Casablanca, Morocco
- East Jerusalem, Palestine
- Hanoi, Vietnam
- Islamabad, Pakistan
- Istanbul, Turkey
- Jeddah, Saudi Arabia
- Kyiv, Ukraine
- Los Angeles, United States
- Maputo, Mozambique
- Moscow, Russia
- Pyongyang, North Korea
- Seoul, South Korea
- Shanghai, China
- Tokyo, Japan

Jayapura

- Vanimo, Papua New Guinea

== K ==
Kupang

- Palmerston, Australia

== M ==
Magelang

- Tula, Russia

Makassar

- Kuala Terengganu, Malaysia
- Lismore, Australia
- Peshawar, Pakistan
- Qingdao, China

Malang

- Fuqing, China

Manado

- Davao City, Philippines

Mataram

- Pengzhou, China

Medan

- Chengdu, China
- Gwangju, South Korea
- Ichikawa, Japan
- Penang Island, Malaysia

== N ==
Nusantara

- Astana, Kazakhstan

== P ==
Padang

- Bà Rịa–Vũng Tàu, Vietnam
- Beit Lahia, Palestine
- Suzhou, China

Palembang

- Iloilo City, Philippines
- Zhangzhou, China

Pontianak

- Kuching, Malaysia

== S ==
Salatiga

- Mungyeong, South Korea

Semarang

- Beihai, China
- Brisbane, Australia
- Fuzhou, China

Siak

- Malacca City, Malaysia

Sidoarjo

- Jinan, China

Singkawang

- Taoyuan, Taiwan

Subang

- Gimcheon, South Korea

Surabaya

- Busan, South Korea
- Guangzhou, China
- Kaohsiung, Taiwan
- Kōchi, Japan
- Liverpool, England, United Kingdom
- Monterrey, Mexico
- Seattle, United States
- Shah Alam, Malaysia
- Varna, Bulgaria
- Xiamen, China

== Y ==
Yogyakarta

- Baalbek, Lebanon
- Commewijne, Suriname
- Gangbuk (Seoul), South Korea
- Huế, Vietnam
- Le Mont-Dore, New Caledonia
- Paramaribo, Suriname
