= Media Indonesia =

Indonesian daily newspaper published in Jakarta

- Referensi Bangsa (The Nation's Reference)
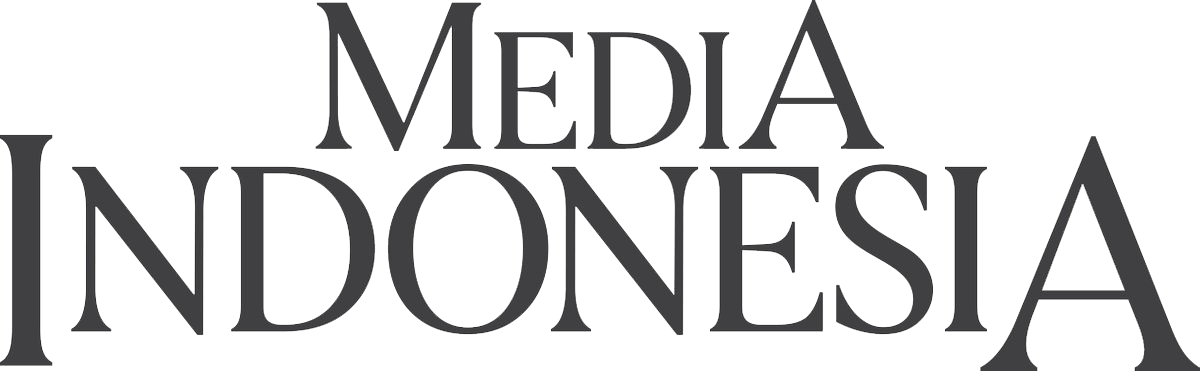
- Type: Daily newspaper
- Format: Broadsheet
- Owner: Media Group
- Founder: Teuku Yousli Syah
- Founded: 19 January 1970; 56 years ago
- Language: Indonesian
- Headquarters: Jalan Pilar Mas Raya Kav. A-D; Kedoya, Kebon Jeruk; Jakarta 11520
- City: Jakarta
- Country: Indonesia
- Sister newspapers: Lampung Post
- ISSN: 0215-4935
- OCLC number: 780415936
- Website: www.mediaindonesia.com

Former logo of Media Indonesia.

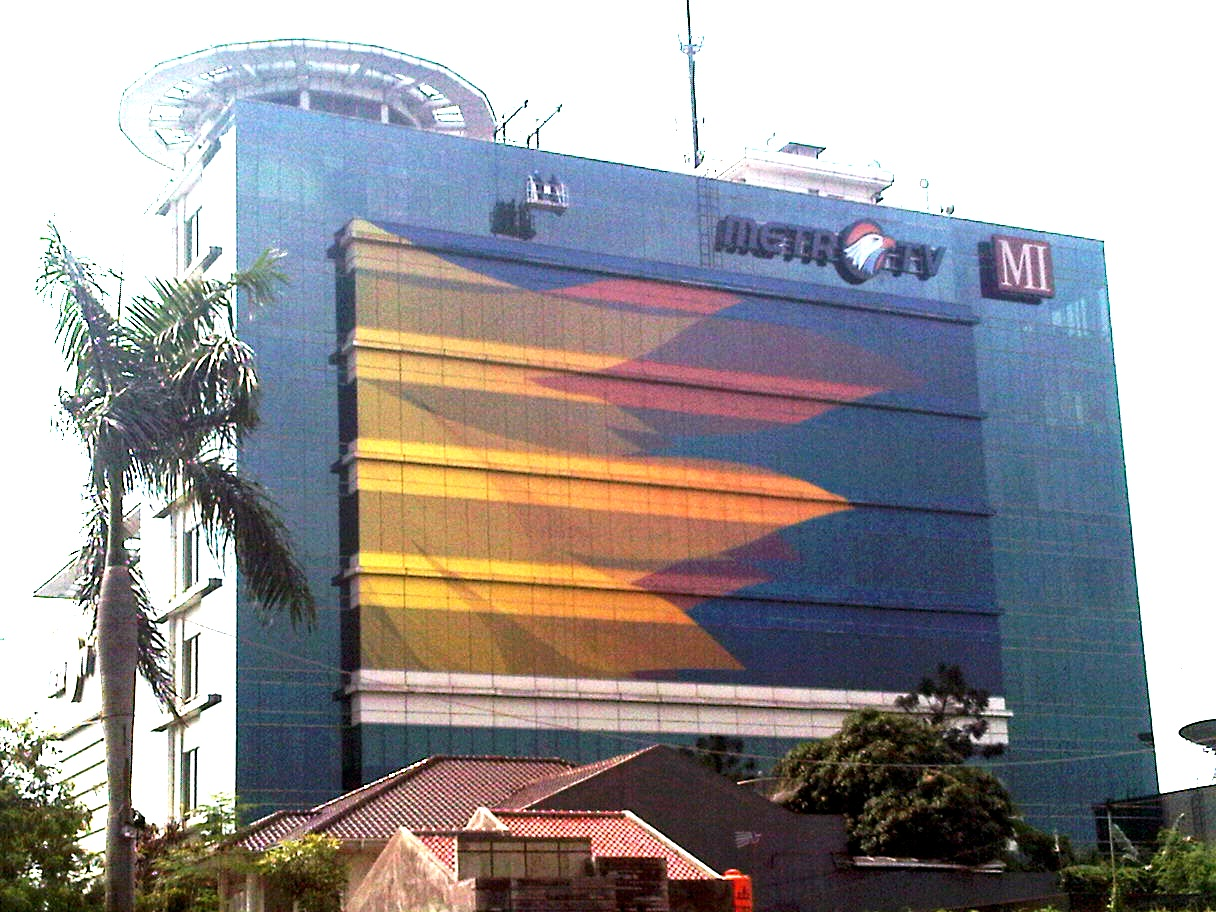
The Metro TV and Media Indonesia head office in Kedoya, West Jakarta.

Media Indonesia is an Indonesian daily newspaper published in Jakarta. Media Indonesia's market share was growing from one percent to 18 percent in 2003 (AC Nielsen).

== History ==
When Media Indonesia was first published in January 1970, it was a weekly newspaper with only four pages and very limited reporting. In 1976, it was enlarged to eight pages. In 1988, its founder, Teuku Yousli Syah, joined forces with Surya Paloh, the former owner of the newspaper Prioritas, and formed a new company, PT Citra Media Nusa Purnama. This marked the birth of the new Media Indonesia under the direction of a new management team. The newspaper was, at that time, run from an office in Gondangdia, Central Jakarta.

The new management set about improving the content and appearance of the paper, and its circulation grew rapidly. Media Indonesia now became available throughout the archipelago. Since 1995, Media Indonesia's operations have been located at the company's own offices in Kedoya, West Jakarta. In this building, all of the newspapers's function are assembled under one roof : editorial and reporting, management, printing, and even leisure facilities of the employees. Media Indonesia currently employs around 600 people. In addition to Media Indonesia, the company also prints a number of other newspapers and tabloids on a contract basis.

== Slogans ==
- Pembawa Suara Rakyat (1970-2000)
- Jendela Informasi Dunia (1992-1995)
- Satu-Satunya Koran Plus! (1997-2000)
- Lugas, Tegas, dan Tepercaya (2000-2010)
- Jujur Bersuara (2010-2021)
- Referensi Bangsa (2021-present)
