= Media Group =

Indonesian media group

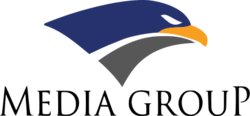

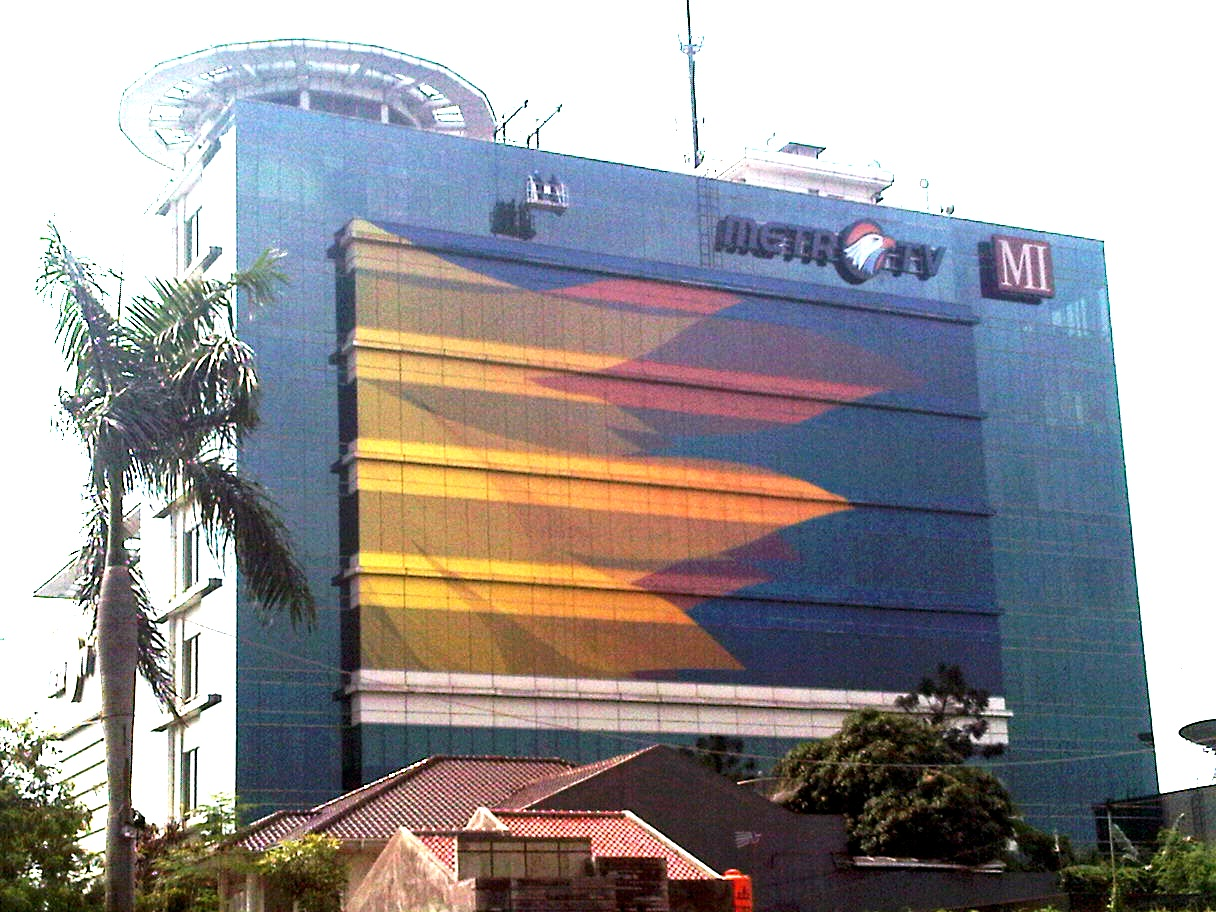
- Media Group office in Kebon Jeruk, West Jakarta
- Company type: Private
- Industry: Media
- Founded: 10 August 1984; 41 years ago, as Media Indonesia Group
- Headquarters: Jakarta, Indonesia
- Key people: Surya Paloh (chairman); Prananda Surya Paloh (advisor); Mohammad Mirdal Akib (CEO)
- Website: www.mediagroup.co.id

Media Group (formerly known as Media Indonesia Group) is an Indonesian media company founded by businessman and politician Surya Paloh. The group owns two newspapers (the national Media Indonesia and the regional Lampung Post), three television networks (Metro TV, BN Channel, and Magna Channel), and a radio station MG Radio Network.

== History ==
Media Group began as a catering company called PT Indocater. Paloh first started media when he founded the holding company PT Surya Persindo and published the newspaper Prioritas on 2 May 1986. However, because it was considered too critical, the newspaper was shut down by the government on 29 June 1987.

Paloh grew the business through acquisitions, such as Media Indonesia in 1987, Vista TV magazine in 1988, Detik in 1992, local newspapers in various regions such as Aceh Post, Cahaya Siang, Gala, and Peristiwa, and MetroTV in 1999.

== Business units ==
=== Print media ===
- PT Citra Media Nusa Purnama (Media Indonesia)
- PT Masa Kini Mandiri (Lampung Post)
- PT Media Nasional Restorasi (Prioritas)

=== Printing ===
- Media Indonesia Publishing
- Lampost Publishing

=== Broadcasting ===
- PT Media Televisi Indonesia (Metro TV)
- PT Mitra Siaran Digital (BN Channel, Metro Globe Network)
- PT Mitra Media Digital (Magna Channel)
- PT Radio Agustina Junior (MG Radio Network)
  - PT Radio Suara Alam Indah (SAI Radio)

=== Online ===
- PT Citra Multimedia Indonesia (Medcom.id)
- Dadali.id
- Clicks.id
- Apakareba.id
- RuangJurnalistik.id
- Gaya.id
- Oase.id
- Autogear.id
- Mediababy
- PT Inibaru Media (Inibaru.id)
- MediaIndonesia.com
- MetroTVNews.com
- PT Citra Multimedia Indonesia Lampung (Lampost.co)
- Podme.id
- PT Media Nuwo Kreatif Nusantara (Toko108.com)
- PT Indonesia Idea Media (iD.M)

=== Event organizer ===
- Lampost Event Organizer

=== Property ===
- PT Citragraha Nugratama (The Papandayan)
- PT Grahasahari Suryajaya (The Media Hotel & Towers)
- Intercontinental Bali Resort
- Gedung Media Group
- PT China Sonangol Media Investment (Indonesia-1 Tower)
- Masjid Nursiah Daud Paloh
- Media Academy
- Lampung Post Education Center

=== Catering and restaurant ===
- PT Indocater
- PT Pangansari Utama Food Resources (Pangansari)
- PT Pangansari Utama (PSU)
- PT Dunia Daging Food Industries (DDFI)
- PT Pangansari Utama Food Industry (PUFI)
- PT Pangansari Utama Food Distributions (PUFD)
- PT Pangansari Utama Patisserie (Pupat)
- PT Plasma Usaha Mitra Selaras (PUMS)
- PT Daya Prima Lestari (DPL)
- PT Niaga Buana Solusi Utama (NBSU)
- PT Indomaint Karya Utama (IMKU)

=== Natural resources ===
- PT Pusaka Marmer Indahraya (Pumarin)
- PT Indoenergi Platinum
- PT Surya Energi Raya
- PT Emas Mineral Murni (EMM)
- PT Media Djaya Bersama

== Former assets ==
- PT Media Kalimantan Mandiri (Borneonews) (now owned by Citra Borneo Indah)
- PT Televisi Mandiri Papua (Papua TV) (previously known by name Metro Papua TV and TVMP)
- PT Sunu Network Broadcast Televisi (Celebes TV) (later owned by Bosowa Corporation and closed in 2023)
- MetroXtend (closed in 2020)
- Jelajah (closed in 2019)
