= Sikakap =

- Sub-district
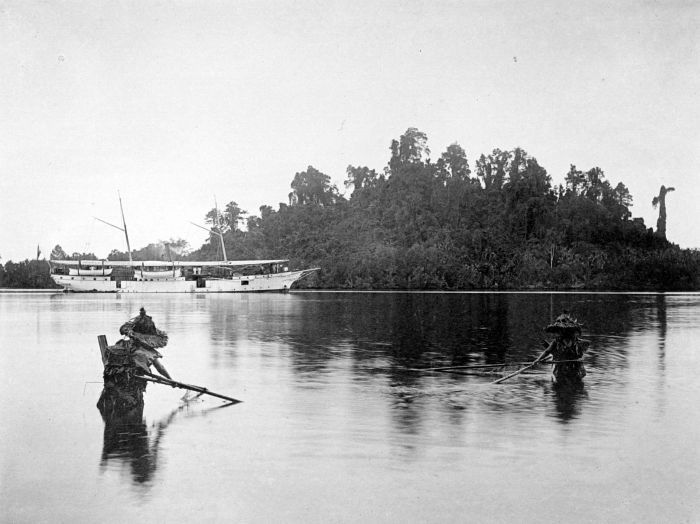
- View of the Sikakap Strait during Dutch rule

- Map showing Sikakap in West Sumatra
- Coordinates: 2°46′00″S 100°13′01″E
- Country: Indonesia
- Province: West Sumatra
- Regency: Mentawai Islands
- Island: North Pagai
- Villages and hamlets: Matobe; Sikakap: Central Sikakap East Sikakap Sibaibai

Area
  - Water: 3,960 ha (9,800 acres)

Population (2016)
  - Total: 3,194

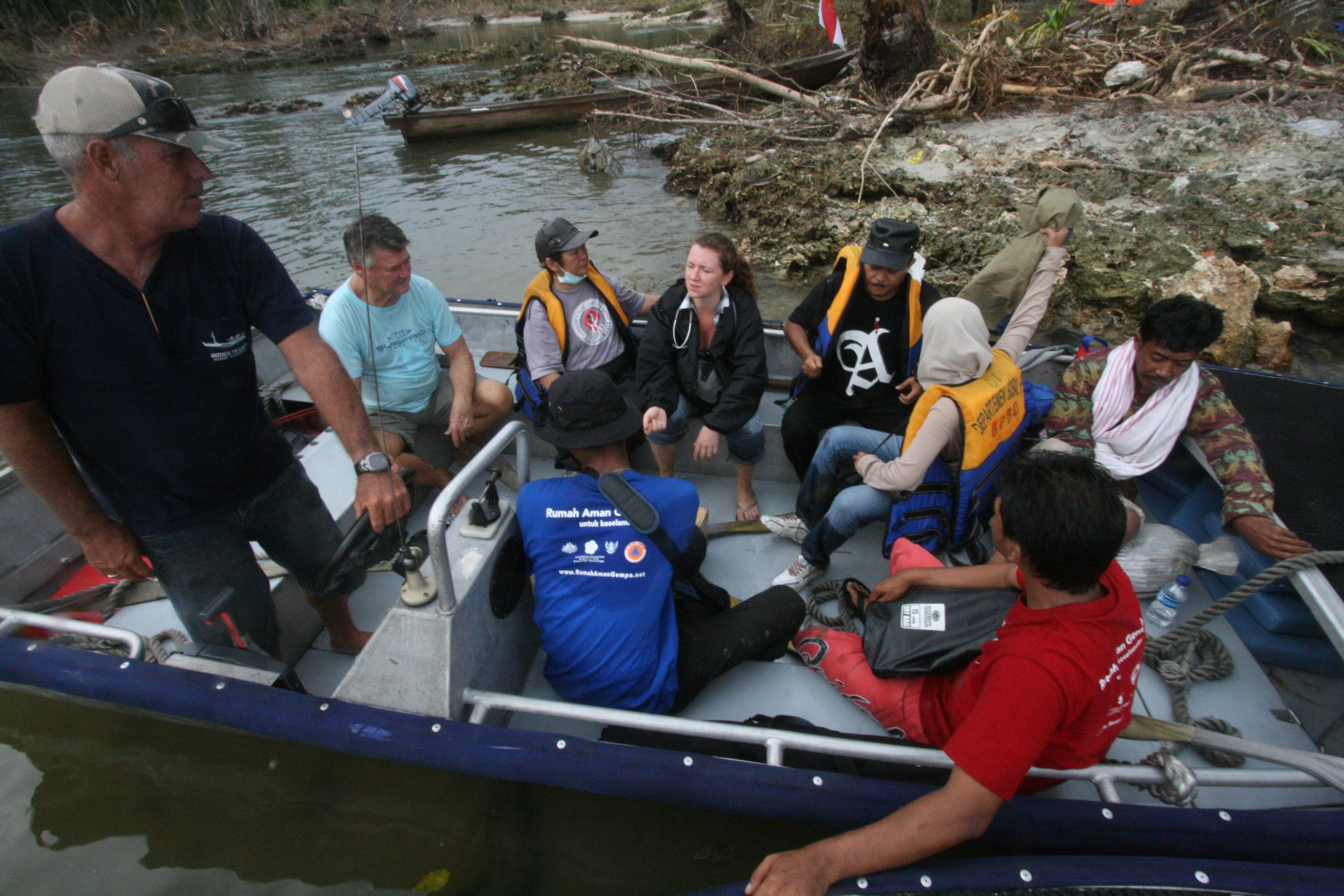
Medical team and SurfAid volunteers evacuating an injured man to Sikakap in October 2010

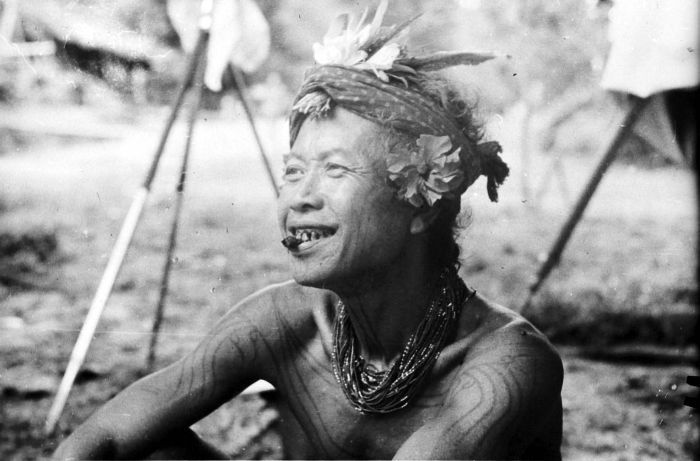
A man in Sikakap in the early 20th century

Sikakap is a sub-district on the Indonesian island of North Pagai, in the Mentawai Islands off Sumatra. The sub-district contains both Sikakap and Matobe, while Sikakap village incorporates the hamlets of Central Sikakap, East Sikakap and Sibaibai. Overall, the total population was 3,194 as of 2016. Also part of the sub-district is the Sikakap Strait between North and South Pagai, a designated Regional Marine Conservation Area. The Strait, an area of 3,960 hectares (9,800 acres), has a coastal length of 19.79 kilometres (12.30 mi) and is a major contributor to West Sumatra's fishing industry.

== History ==
Dutch colonisation came relatively late to the Mentawai Islands. As Dutch officials had little interest in them, they called upon the Rhenish Missionary Society to begin the "civilisation" process. To that end, a German missionary, A. Lett, was appointed at Sikakap in 1901. His missionaries established a school nearby. From this initial settlement, the Dutch expanded into the other Mentawai Islands.

There was a magnitude 7.5 tsunami in the area on 6 February 1908.

Surrounding forests have been the site of heavy logging since the 1970s.

== Facilities ==
Sikakap, along with Tuapeijat, is one of the only places in the Mentawai Islands where electricity and telecommunications are available. There is a hospital and a church in the village, as well as a harbor (the main transport hub in the Mentawai islands) and a district police station. The primary transport connection is a twice-weekly ferry, the KMP Ambu-ambu, which runs between Sikakap and Padang. In 2007, Surfing Magazine described the sub-district as a "regular re-fuelling spot for charter boats".

== 2010 earthquake and tsunami ==
Sikapap served as a centre for relief operations related to the 2010 Mentawai earthquake and tsunami. Eyewitnesses reported that waves up to 2 metres (6.6 ft) high hit the sub-district. Relief agencies and a government command post were based there during the crisis, as it is the largest village on Sipura and Pagai. Over 200 people sought assistance at the local hospital, more than it could take, and the local church was converted into a makeshift medical center. Military supplies for the hospital began arriving on 30 October. A month later, displaced people were still living in tents in Sikakap, leading the government to announce the construction of 16 homes there, as 17 had been heavily damaged.
