= Mentawai langur =

Conservation status
- Critically Endangered (IUCN 3.1)
- CITES Appendix I

Scientific classification
- Kingdom: Animalia
- Phylum: Chordata
- Class: Mammalia
- Order: Primates
- Family: Cercopithecidae
- Genus: Presbytis
- Species: P. potenziani

Binomial name
- Presbytis potenziani (Bonaparte, 1856)
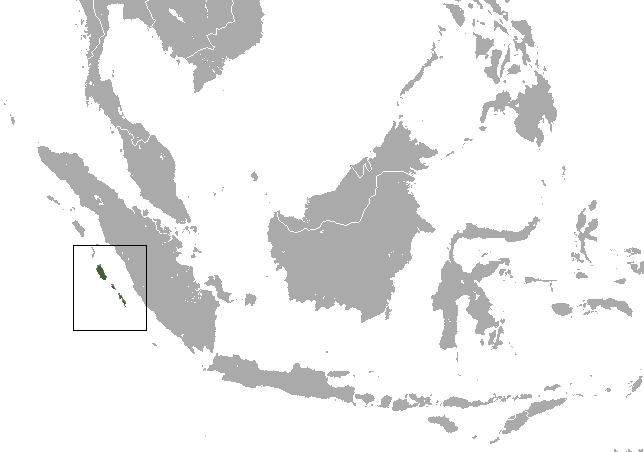
- Mentawai langur range

Species of Old World monkey

The Mentawai langur (Presbytis potenziani) is a species of primate in the family Cercopithecidae. It is endemic to the Mentawai Islands in Indonesia. Its natural habitat is subtropical or tropical dry forests. The Siberut langur (P. siberu) was formerly considered a subspecies of the Mentawai langur.

== Description ==
Mentawai langur infants are born with a white pelage. After two to three weeks, the pelage begins to darken and the face becomes darkly pigmented. This change of coloration begins in the dorsal midline and head and ends laterally. After three months, the belly and chest are dark reddish-brown, throat, cheeks, forehead and tip of tail are white and the rest of the body is jet black. Males are differentiated from females by having a white circumgenital patch of fur. Mentawai langurs have a slender body with hind limbs longer than their forelimbs.

== Distribution and habitat ==
Mentawai langurs are endemic to the islands of Sipora, North Pagai, and South Pagai. They inhabit primary and secondary forests dominated by dipterocarps. The trees used by Presbytis potenziani as sleeping areas are typically 35 metres (115 ft) in height. The langurs sleep in the mid-upper levels of these trees above 20 metres (66 ft), where the canopy density is thickest, with the most common sites being in coconut groves.

== Behavior and diet ==
On average, groups of Mentawai langurs travel 540 metres (1,770 ft) each day. Heavy rainfall affects movement patterns light to moderate rainfall does not. The langurs move by quadrupedal running and climbing; they also leap in the mid and upper portions of the canopy and drop when nearer to the ground. Home ranges vary from 11 to 40 hectares (27 to 99 acres). The groups are not migrants. Their social organisation is variable: unimale-unifemale, unimale-multifemale, multimale-multifemale.

Mentawai langurs spend more than 80% of their time resting and foraging and only a small portion traveling and conducting social behavior. Such extensive periods of resting and foraging are required for colobines that consume seeds, unripe fruits and leaves to support their digestion. Adult males typically move away from the group in the early morning and give long calls.

The langurs feed in the upper portion of the canopy. In some areas, their diet consists of 55% leaves, 32% fruit and seed and 13% other source of food such as flowers, bark, sap, and fungi. but groups that forage in secondary forests have a diet of 70% fruits and seeds and up to 35% "climber" type vegetation. The niche breadth of Presbytis potenziani is 0.22, based on Levin's index.

== Conservation ==
The Mentawai langur is currently listed as critically endangered on the IUCN Red List. Over the 36 years prior to 2021, the population is estimated to have declined by 80%. The main threats to the monkeys are humans hunting for food and destruction of the habitat for agriculture. 25% of the hunting on Mentawai langur is by natives of central-south Siberut. Recommendations to conserve the species include development of a biosphere reserve on Siberut Island, creation of a primate reserve on South Pagai Island and offshore islands, a survey of primates on Sipora Island, a captive breeding program to recover the endemic subspecies of Mentawai primates on the southern islands, and beginning a campaign in education and law enforcement to prevent hunting of Mentawai langurs.
