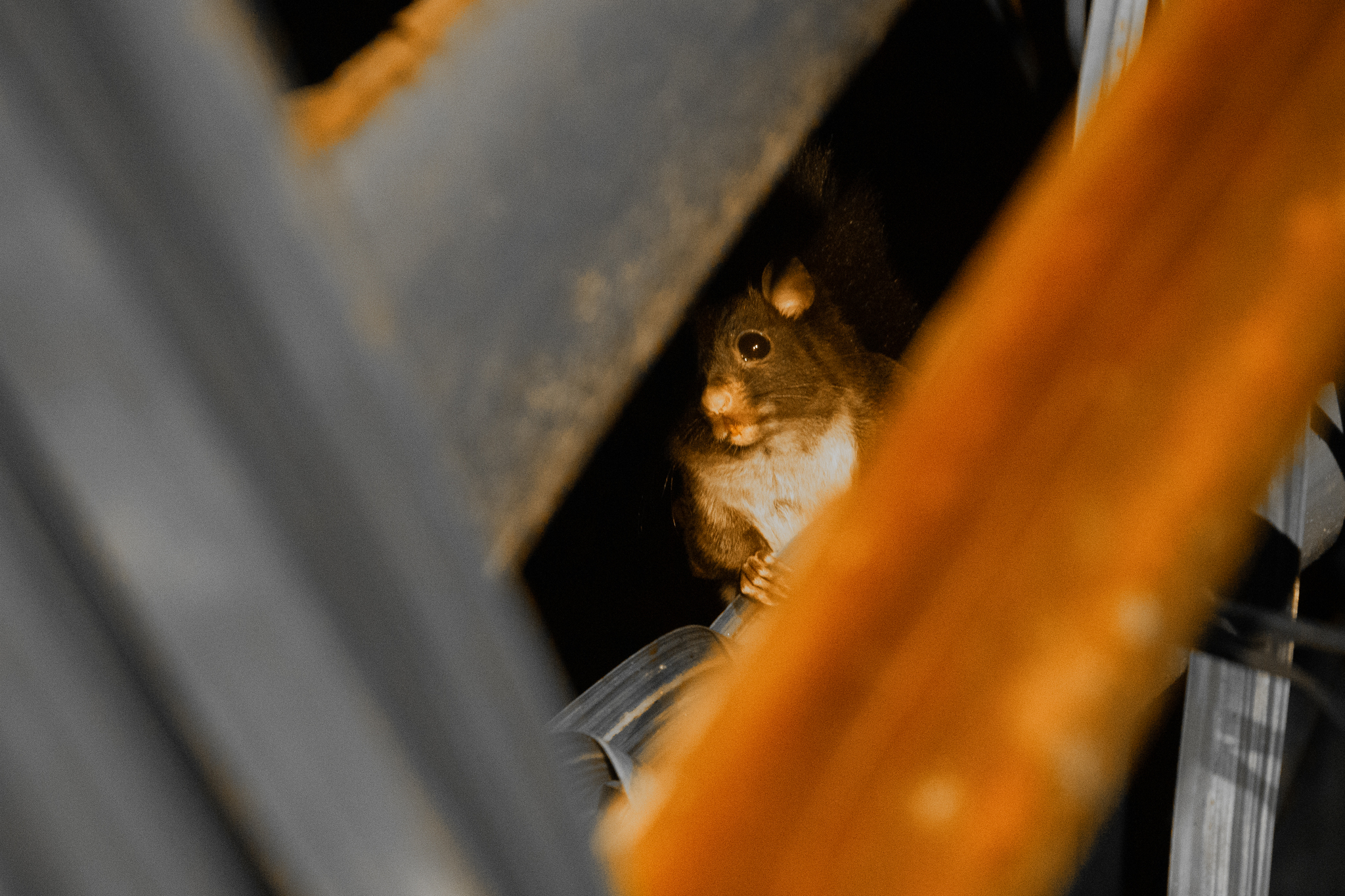

Conservation status
- Endangered (IUCN 3.1)

Scientific classification
- Kingdom: Animalia
- Phylum: Chordata
- Class: Mammalia
- Infraclass: Placentalia
- Order: Rodentia
- Family: Sciuridae
- Genus: Iomys
- Species: I. sipora

Binomial name
- Iomys sipora Chasen & Kloss, 1928

= Mentawi flying squirrel =

Species of rodent

The Mentawi flying squirrel (Iomys sipora) is a species of rodent in the family Sciuridae. It is endemic to Indonesia where it is only known from the Mentawai Islands (Sipura and North Pagai). Its natural habitat is lowland tropical primary forest below 500 m (1,600 ft) above sea level. It is threatened by habitat loss.

== Geographic distribution ==
It is endemic to the jungles of the Mentawai Islands (Indonesia).

== Conservation status ==
It is threatened with extinction due to the loss of its natural habitat.
