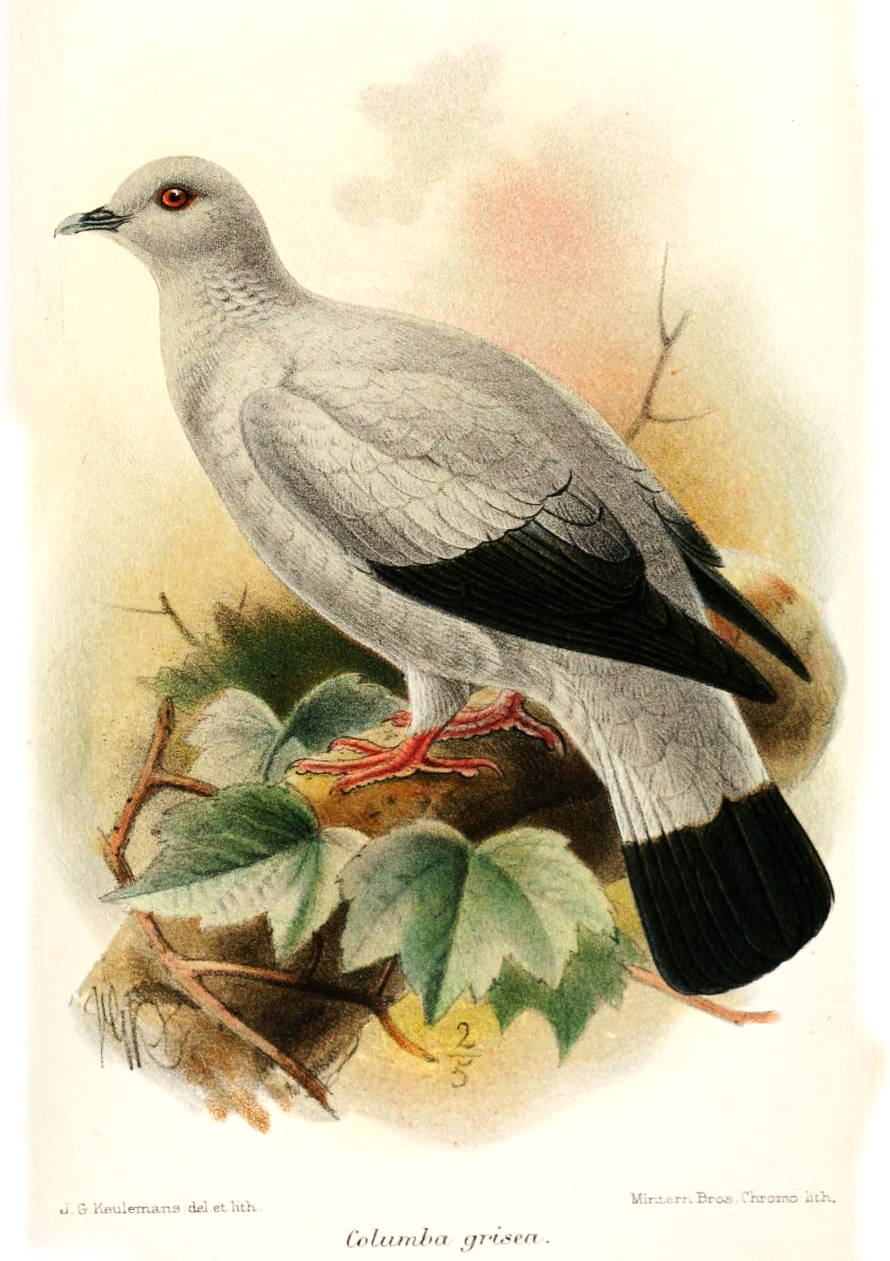
- Illustration by Keulemans, 1893

Conservation status
- Critically Endangered (IUCN 3.1)

Scientific classification
- Kingdom: Animalia
- Phylum: Chordata
- Class: Aves
- Order: Columbiformes
- Family: Columbidae
- Genus: Columba
- Species: C. argentina

Binomial name
- Columba argentina Bonaparte, 1855
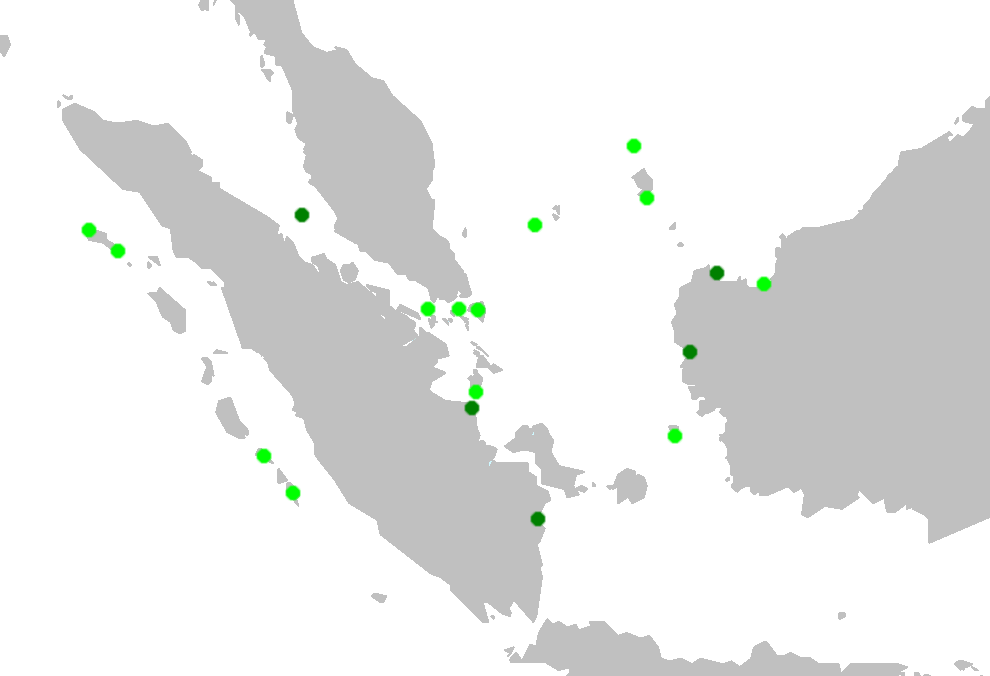
- Distribution of the silvery pigeon. Verified records are light, unconfirmed ones dark green.

Synonyms
- Carpophaga grisea Grey, 1844 (nomen nudum); Myristicivora grisea Bonaparte, 1855 (nomen nudum); Columba phasma Richmond, 1903

= Silvery pigeon =

Species of bird

The silvery pigeon (Columba argentina), also known as silvery wood-pigeon or grey wood-pigeon, is a species of pigeon found in Indonesia and Malaysia. It was thought to be extinct but wild populations rediscovered in 2008 near Masokut Island of the Mentawai archipelago might represent this species, and photographs from Simeulue confirm its existence there.

== Taxonomy ==
The silvery pigeon was formally described in 1855 by the French naturalist Charles Lucien Bonaparte as Columba argentina. He gave the locality as Malaysia and Borneo. This was a replacement name for Carpophaga grisea that had been introduced by George Gray in 1844. The specific epithet argentina is Latin meaning "of silver" or "silvery". The species is monotypic: no subspecies are recognised.

== Description ==
The silvery pigeon is indistinguishable from the pied imperial pigeon at a distance, although this is not necessarily true vice versa; as the pied imperial pigeon can vary between a pale grey, pure white and even yellowish colouration, it is often possible to tell that a bird is not a C. argentina. At close quarters, the silvery pigeon may be recognized by a few characteristics: The plumage is always a pale silvery grey, with black remiges and ends of the tail feathers; there may be a slight greenish sheen on the feathers of the backsides of the neck. The black part of the tail is equal in length in all feathers, whereas it forms a black triangle pointing headwards on the underside of the pied imperial pigeon's tail.

Most distinguishing characteristics are located on the head, which is shaped differently, with a sloping forehead (rounded in the PIP), conspicuous dark red or purplish eye-wattles (none in the PIP) and eyes, and a bill that is darker at the base (lighter at the base in the PIP), being dusky purple with a pale apple-green tip. The feet are bluish-grey, mottled with varying amounts of red. The birds are slightly smaller than the PIP, with a total length of around 36 cm, females being marginally larger and darker than males on average, and juvenile birds are apparently more sandy-coloured on the upperpart feather fringes and breast. While the weight is not recorded, comparison with related species gives an estimate of 350 grams on average.

The colour pattern, unusual for a Columba pigeon, probably represents convergent evolution towards the PIP, and possibly even a case of Müllerian mimicry, the anti-predator attribute being the PIP's habit to aggregate in large flocks which makes it harder for predators to pick out individual birds, and enables the much rarer silvery pigeon to share this advantage.

== Distribution ==
This species was recorded during the late 19th and early 20th century from offshore islands of the Natuna Sea (west of Borneo) and west of Sumatra, Indonesia, and on the adjacent mainland. The oldest record is that of a specimen supposedly taken near Pontianak before 1850. Verifiable records exist from Burong Island, Sarawak (1899), Saya in the Lingga Islands (same year), Simeulue (e.g. Teluk Dalam and Teluk Labuan Bajau, 1901), South Pagai (1902) and Sipura in the Mentawai Islands, the Riau Islands (several times), Tuangku Airdingin (1913), Jemaja Andriabu in the Anamba Islands (1925), the North Natuna Islands (1928), and in Sumatra's Jambi and possibly South Sumatra provinces. Locations recorded earlier included Bintan in the Riau Islands (June 1930) and Pulau Gurungan Besar in the Karimata islands (March 1931) and (unconfirmed, before 1937) from Pulau Jarak in the Straits of Malacca. The species was rediscovered by a photograph - "2008 one individual was photographed between the islets of Mastokut Island and Simaimu Islands, off the southern tip of Siberut in the Mentawai Islands, Indonesia, confirming that the species survives in the wild."

Bulletin of the British Ornithologists' Club Vol. 129, (September) 2009. LEE, M. T., DONG, D. L. & ONG, T. P. A photographic record of Silvery Pigeon Columba Argentina from the Mentawai Islands, Indonesia, with notes on identification, distribution and conservation

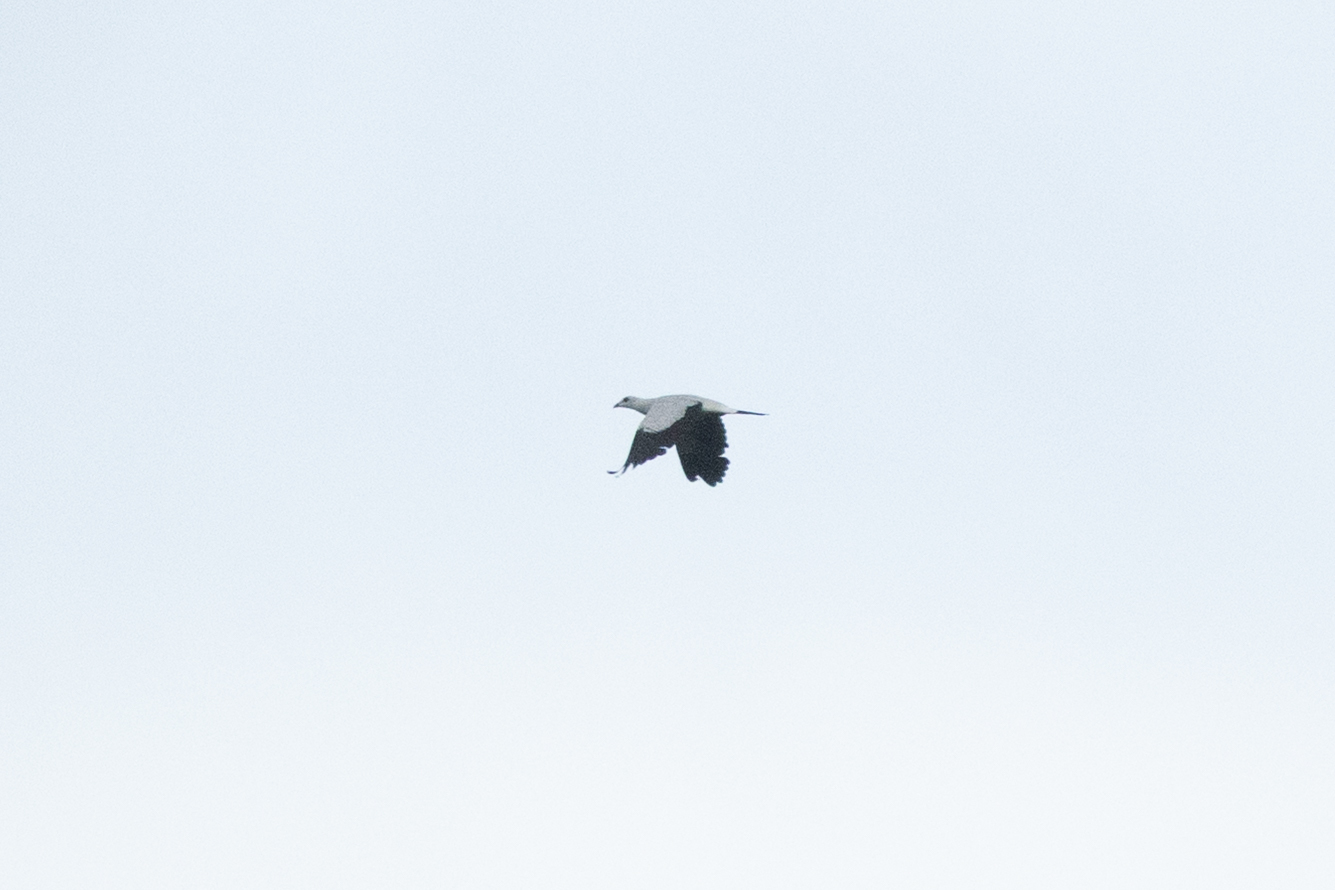
Flying

== Ecology ==
The silvery pigeon is known from mangrove forests and other woodland in the low-lying offshore islands and adjacent coastal regions, at an altitude below 100 m ASL. It is believed to wander around following fruit in season, and was often found in association with much larger flocks of the pied imperial pigeon. It also breeds in these birds' nesting colonies, probably over a period of several months from March/April on. Like most other pigeons, it builds a flimsy stick nest in trees and lays a single white egg, which has a chalky, not glossy shell (as opposed to that of the PIP).

== Current status ==
This species has been classified as Critically Endangered (D1) by BirdLife International, translating into an estimated population of less than fifty mature individuals. This is based on a lack of confirmed sightings, however, and thus the species may actually be more common and simply not identified due to its resemblance with the pied imperial pigeon.

The reasons for the bird's apparent decline are not well known. While deforestation, especially the removal of mangrove forests, certainly adversely affects this bird, it is not known to have started on a massive scale at such an early date. Similarly, introduction of alien predators (like cats that become feral) will jeopardize breeding on offshore islets, but this is also not believed to have been significant at the time the records ceased. At any rate, the species is not found anymore on Burong, the Mentawi and the Riau Islands today, and likely only occurs on Siberut, Simeulue, and some of the surrounding islets.

There are some 1980s and 1990s records, supposedly of large numbers of individuals, from Padang-Sugihan Wildlife Reserve and Sembilang River in South Sumatra, and Berbak National Park in Jambi province. It is conjectured that the bird may exist, possibly in considerable numbers, in South Sumatra, especially the Banyuasin peninsula, or Padang-Sugihan Wildlife Reserve. None of these records has been verified, however, and the species was never considered to be particularly numerous, especially when compared to the PIP. Most recently, the silvery pigeon was believed to have been seen on Pulau Talang Besar, Talang Talang Islands (part of Talang-Satang National Park), in 2001 (Wilson, 2004). Butchart et al. (2006) also mention an unconfirmed record in 2002.

In 2011 individuals observed for the first time at Tanahbala in the Batu Islands were also associating with Pied and Green Imperial Pigeons. In 2016, a zoo in Nias discovered two silvery pigeons in captivity, when they were performing inventory.
