= Rokot Airport =

Airport in Indonesia

Rokot Airport Bandar Udara Rokot
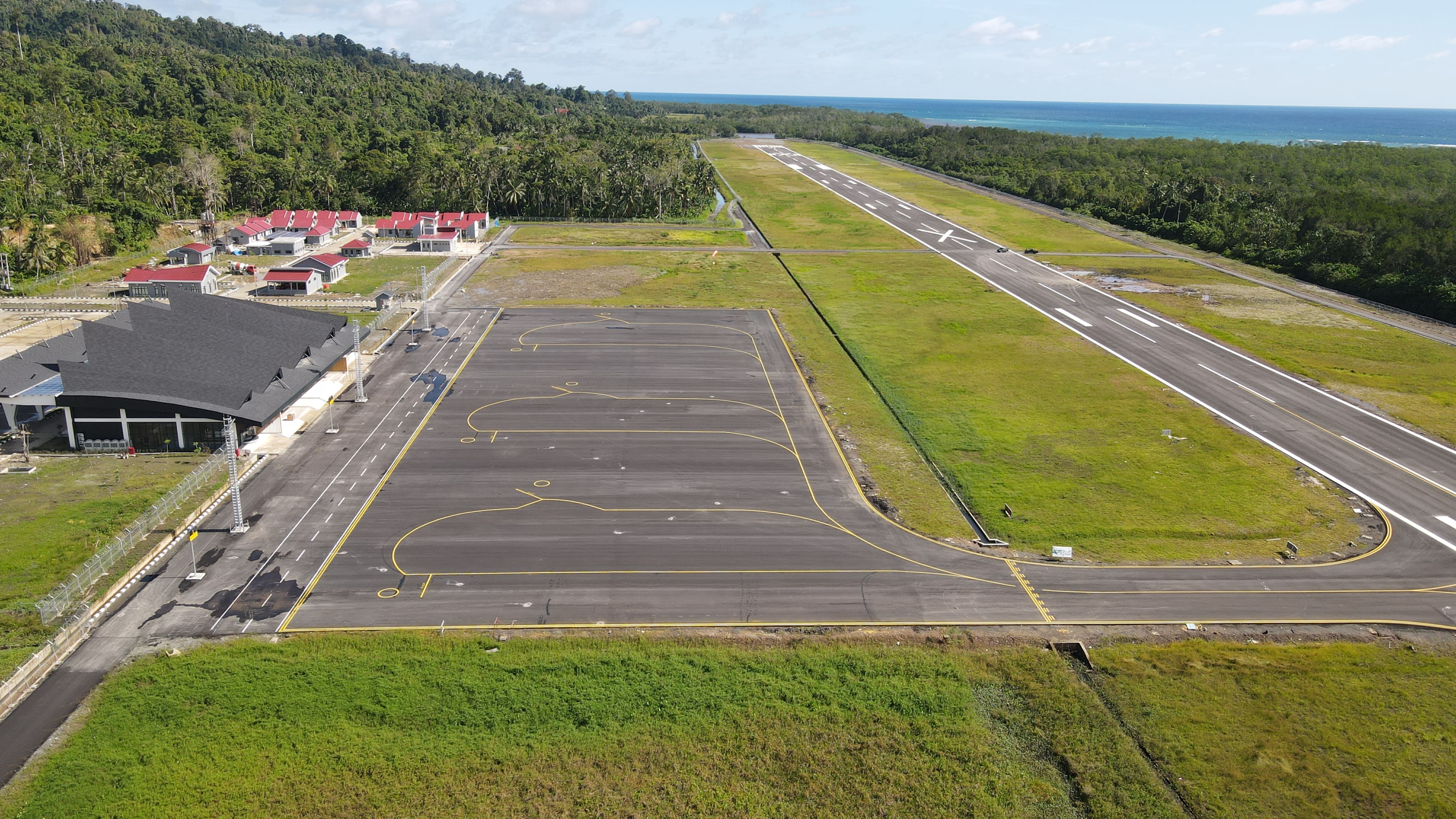
- IATA: RKI; ICAO: WIBR

Summary
- Airport type: Public
- Owner: Government of Indonesia
- Operator: Directorate General of Civil Aviation
- Serves: Mentawai Islands
- Location: Sipora Selatan, Mentawai Islands, West Sumatra
- Time zone: WIB (UTC+07:00)
- Elevation AMSL: 30 ft / 9 m
- Coordinates: 2.1001°S 99.7044°E

Maps
- Sumatra region in Indonesia

- Location of airport in West Sumatra / Indonesia RKI/WIBR (Indonesia)

Runways
Direction	Length		Surface
Direction	m	ft	Surface
14/32	1,500	4,921	Asphalt
~~17/35~~	~~900~~	~~2,789~~	~~Asphalt~~
- Source: Directorate General of Civil Aviation

Rokot Airport (IATA: RKI, ICAO: WIBR), also known as Mentawai Airport, is an airport located in Sipora, Mentawai Islands, West Sumatra, serving Tuapeijat, the largest town in the Mentawai Islands. The airport serves as the primary gateway to the Mentawai Islands. It currently operates only regional flights to and from Padang, the provincial capital of West Sumatra.

The airport was built and completed in 1980. It originally had a 900 × 23 meter runway. However, due to erosion near the shoreline, the airport was at risk of sinking. The runway, which was originally around 900 meters long, has eroded to approximately 800 meters. This is due to the close proximity between the runway and the shoreline. In addition to coastal erosion, the airport is also at risk of submersion due to local communities extracting coral stones for house construction.

To accommodate the growing passenger traffic to the Mentawai Islands, a new terminal and runway were built and completed on 25 October 2023, at a cost of approximately 547 million Rupiah. They were inaugurated by President Joko Widodo, replacing the old terminal and runway, which were at risk due to erosion and could only accommodate small aircraft as they could not be extended further.

== Facilities and development ==
The new terminal, located 2.4 km from the old terminal, covers an area of 1,600 square meters and can accommodate up to 53,881 passengers annually. The airport also features an apron measuring 175 meters by 75 meters and a taxiway sized 75 meters by 15 meters, allowing it to accommodate larger aircraft such as the ATR-72. The new runway, measuring 1,500 meters by 30 meters, is significantly longer than the old runway, which was only 900 meters by 23 meters and could only accommodate smaller aircraft like the Cessna 208 Caravan. There are plans to extend the runway by 400 to 700 meters in the future to accommodate even larger aircraft, such as the Boeing 737.

== Airlines and destinations ==
Airlines	Destinations
Susi Air	Padang

== Statistics ==
Busiest flights out of Rokot Airport by frequency (2025)
Rank	Destinations	Frequency (weekly)	Airline(s)
1	Padang, West Sumatra	2	Susi Air

== Gallery ==
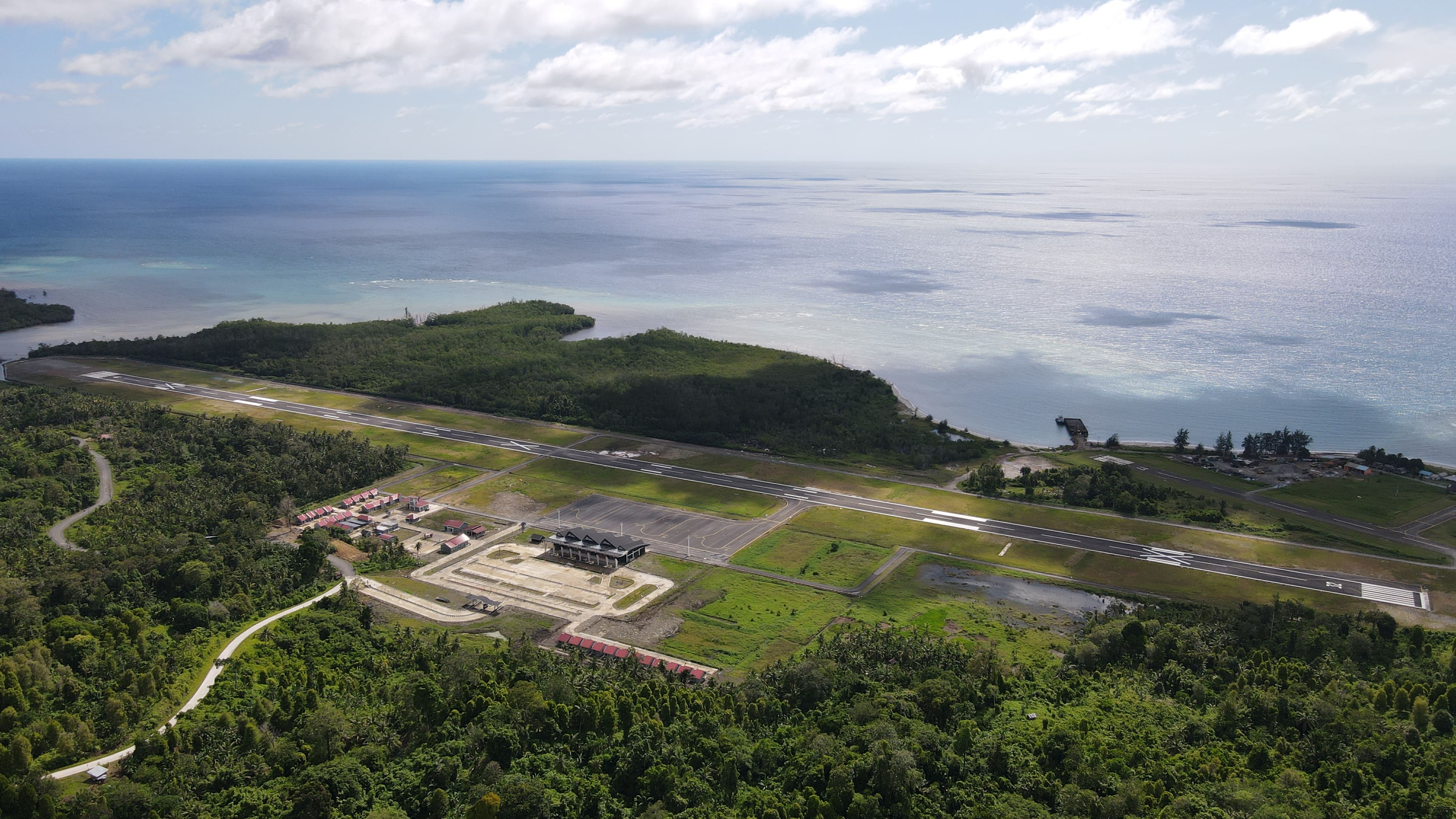
Aerial view of the airport. The old runway can be seen in the far right

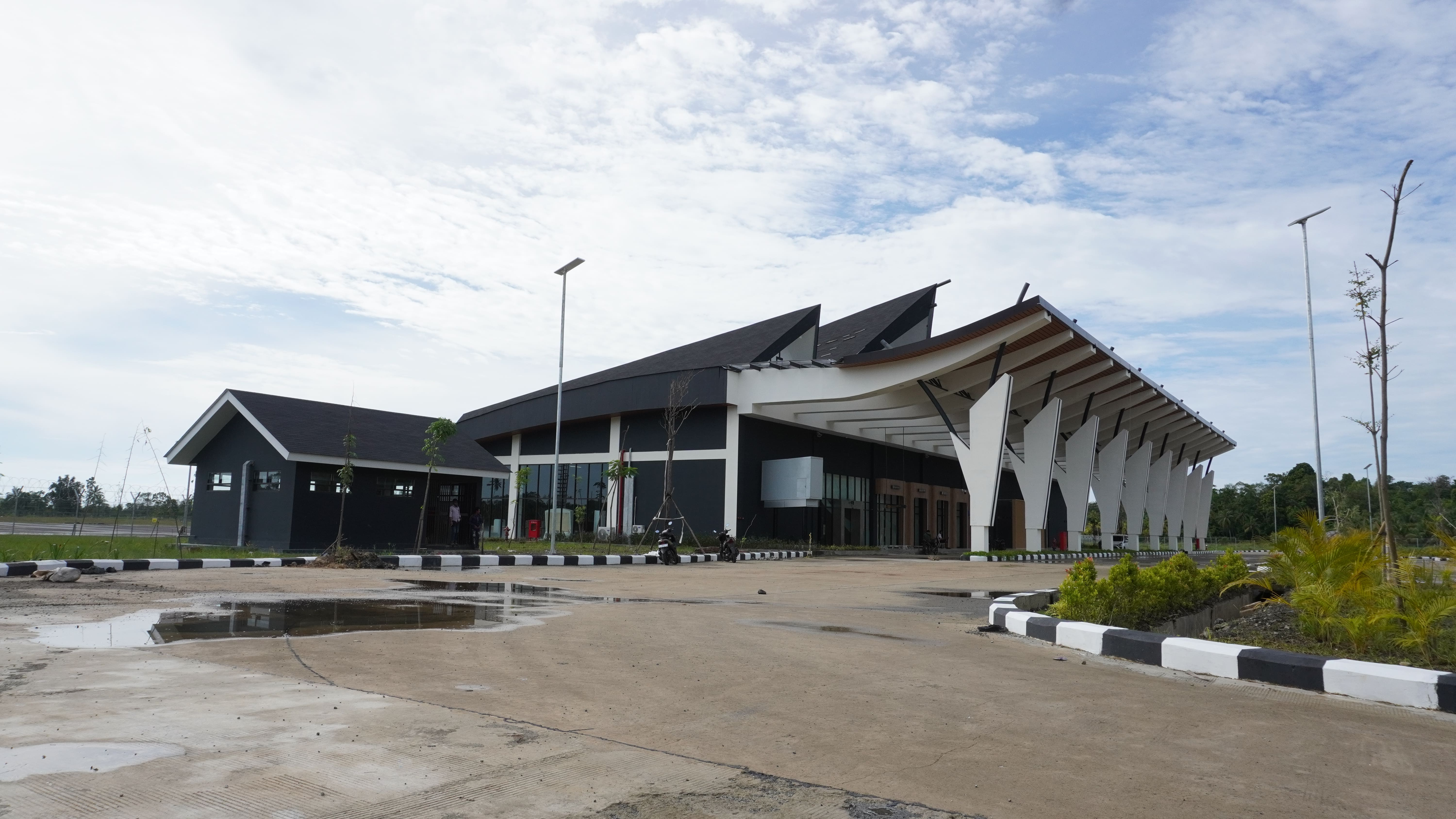
Exterior of the terminal

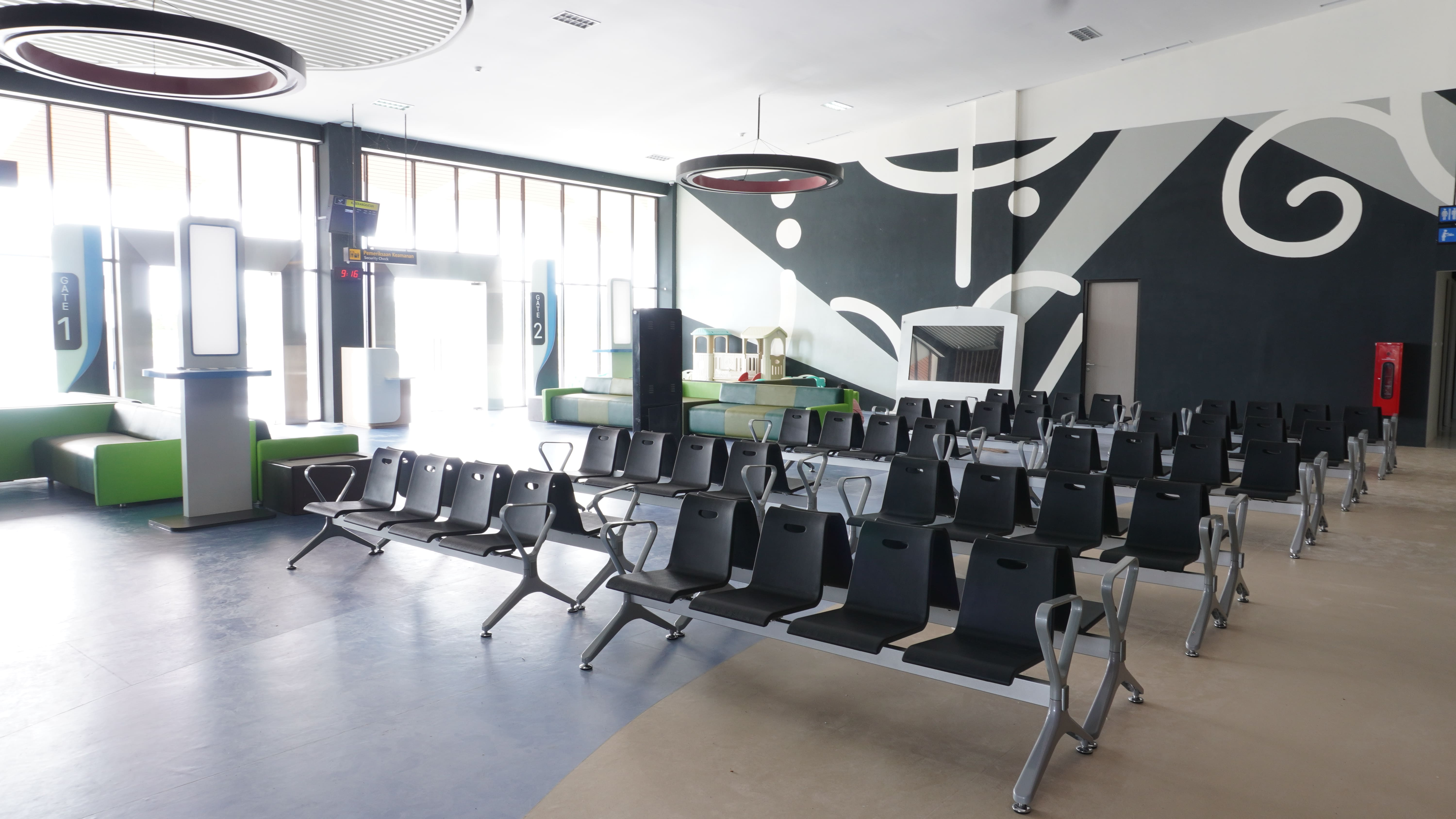
Waiting lounge

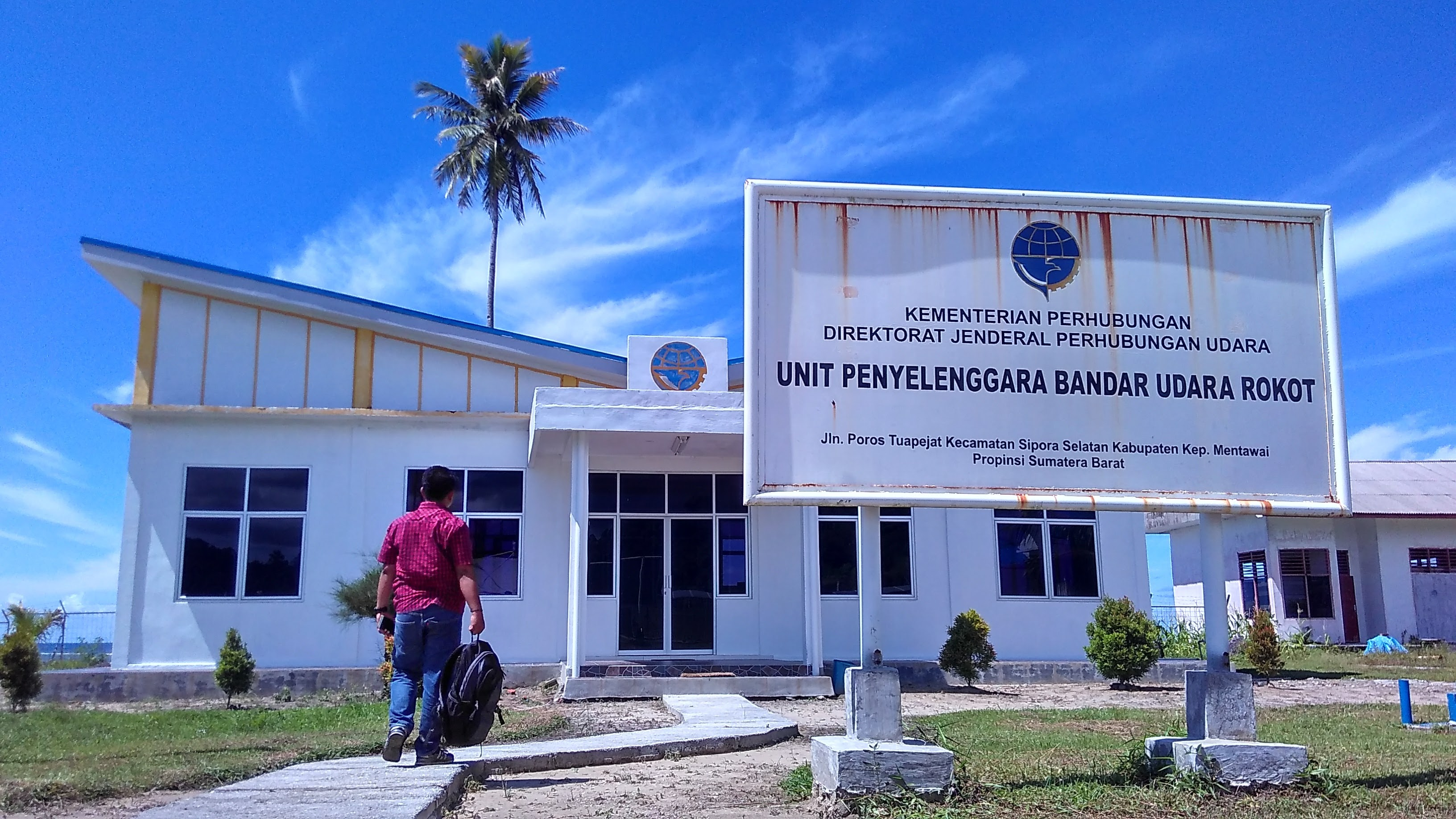
The old terminal, which is no longer in use since 2023
