= North Sipora =

North Sipore Sipora Utara
- District
- Location within Sumatra
- Coordinates: 2°2′7″S 99°35′0″E
- Country: Indonesia
- Province: West Sumatra
- Regency: Mentawai Islands

Area
  - Total: 383.08 km^{2} (147.91 sq mi)

Population (2015 estimate)
  - Total: 12,056
  - Density: 31.471/km^{2} (81.510/sq mi)

North Sipore is a district of Mentawai Islands Regency in Indonesia. It is located on the northern portion of the Sipore Island. The seat of the regency is located in Tuapejat, on the northern tip of the district. With just over 12,000 inhabitants in 2015, it is the most populated district in the regency.

The district is subdivided into 5 villages and a kelurahan:

1. Betumonga
2. Goiso Oinan
3. Bukit Pamewa
4. Sipora Jaya
5. Sidomakmur
6. Tuapejat (kelurahan, regency and district seat)
