= Martin Daly =

Martin Daly may refer to:

- Martin Daly (professor) (born 1944), Canadian psychologist and academic
- Martin Daly (captain) (born 1957), Australian ship's captain and surfer
- Martin Daly (politician) (born 1962/3), Irish politician
