= MV Indies Trader =

Surf exploration vessel

Indies Trader
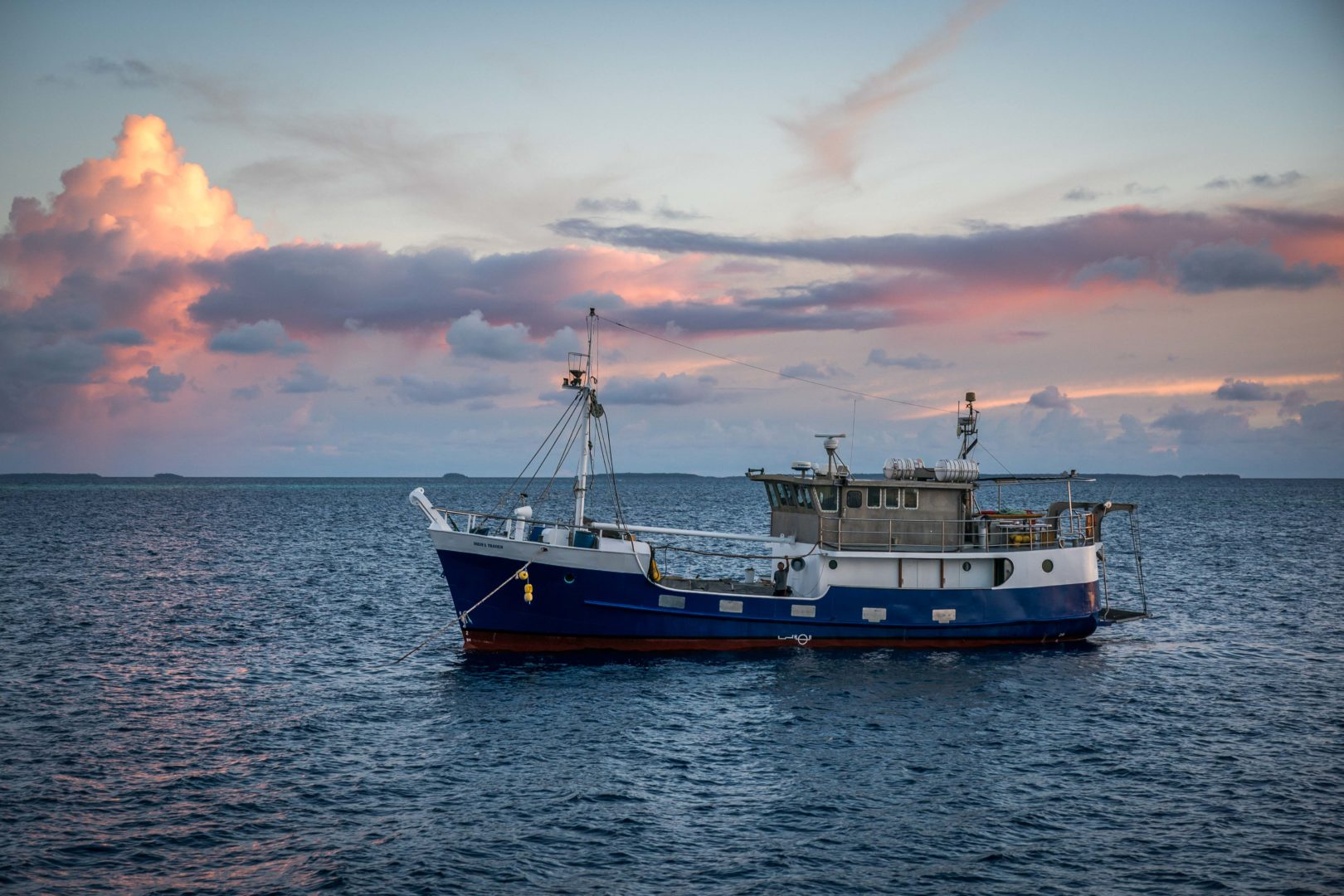
- Other names: Rader
- Designer(s): Rick James
- Year built: 1972
- Builder: KB Welding, Brisbane, Australia
- Year rebuilt: 1992, Pandan shipyard, Singapore
- Builder: KB Welding, Brisbane, Australia
- Owner(s): Martin Daly

Specifications
- Type: Diving and Survey
- Construction: Steel with aluminum wheelhouse
- Length: 75 feet
- Weight: 95 tons
- Cruising speed: 8 knots
- Range: 5,000 nautical miles
- Crew: Captain, engineer plus four crew

Notes
- Notes: Formerly the Rader, Rebuilt as Indies Trader

The Indies Trader is a surf exploration vessel, which took part in the Quiksilver Crossing from 1999-2005.

== The Rader ==
Rick James designed the Rader. He graduated from the University of Queensland’s Bachelor of Naval Architecture program. It was owned first by Dave Barnett, a New Zealander raised in Fiji, using it for marine salvage jobs, the primary function of the boats large cargo hold and crane.

== Extension and renaming ==
After diving a big wreck and finding controversial treasure, Dave Barnett decided to sell the boat to one of his crew, Martin Daly. When it was sold to Martin, it was renamed Indies Trader to keep the Rader name intact and avoid the bad luck of renaming a boat. Using the same designer, Rick James, it was cut in half and extended by 6 feet.

== Surf Discovery ==
The boat is credited with discovering many surf breaks, including One Palm Point and being the first boat in the Mentawai Islands. The boat stumbled upon Lance Knight a couple weeks after he arrived by canoe, and named the surf break after him, Lance's Right. Captain Daly and the Indies Trader have discovered more surf breaks than anyone in human history.

== The Quiksilver Crossing ==
Supported by the United Nations, Quiksilver organized a seven year trip around the world, discovering new surf breaks, as well as checking on the coral health around the globe. The Crossing has been called one of the most groundbreaking moments in surf history. The voyage took them to 56 countries and 26 states and four territories, they discovered more than 115 new surf breaks, as well as going over 160,000 nautical miles, the equivalent of circumnavigating the world eight times.
