= Eois plumbacea =

Scientific classification
- Kingdom: Animalia
- Phylum: Arthropoda
- Clade: Pancrustacea
- Class: Insecta
- Order: Lepidoptera
- Family: Geometridae
- Genus: Eois
- Species: E. plumbacea

Binomial name
- Eois plumbacea (Warren, 1894)

Synonyms
- Pseudasthena plumbacea Warren, 1894; Anthyria metriopis Meyrick, 1897

Species of moth

Eois plumbacea is a moth in the family Geometridae. It is found on Borneo and the Mentawi Islands. The habitat consists of lowland areas, including dipterocarp forests.
