= Purple pigeon =

Both purple pigeon and purple wood pigeon may refer to either:

- Japanese wood pigeon (C. janthina), of East Asia
- Pale-capped pigeon (C. punicea), of South and Southeast Asia

== See also ==
- The Purple Pidgin, mascot of Pidgin instant-messaging software
