= Eois versata =

Scientific classification
- Kingdom: Animalia
- Phylum: Arthropoda
- Clade: Pancrustacea
- Class: Insecta
- Order: Lepidoptera
- Family: Geometridae
- Genus: Eois
- Species: E. versata

Binomial name
- Eois versata (Walker, 1861)

Synonyms
- Hyria versata Walker, 1861

Species of moth

Eois versata is a moth in the family Geometridae. It is found on Borneo and the Mentawi Islands. The habitat consists of lower montane forests.
