= Mentawai Festival =

Indonesian cultural festival

Mentawai Festival Festival Pesona Mentawai (FPM)
- Status: Active
- Genre: Festival
- Frequency: Annual
- Venue: Mentawai Islands Regency, West Sumatra
- Country: Indonesia
- Years active: 2016–present
- Previous event: November 1–4, 2018
- Organiser: Mentawai Islands Regency Government
- Website: www.sukumentawai.org/en/2018/09/mentawai-cultural-performance-festival/

Metawai Festival or Mentawai Charm Festival (Indonesian: Festival Pesona Mentawai) is a traditional festival/carnival held annually since 2016 at Mentawai Islands Regency, West Sumatra in Indonesia. The festival aims to promote national and international tourism to the Mentawai Islands Regency, arranged by the Indonesian Ministry of Tourism and local regency administration. The Mentawai people believe to have ancestry since 1500 BC.

== Festivities ==
The festival showcases traditional wedding ceremonies, traditional clothing parade, traditional tattoo demonstrations, traditional boat making, traditional archery, tribal war dance, mass dance performance, traditional bow-hunting, traditional culinary, and other traditional Mentawai culture.

Events such as surfing are included. International surfers participate in the surfing competition.

== See also ==
- Mentawai people
