= Lance's Right =

Surfing break in Mentawaii Islands, Indonesia

Coordinates: 2.375666°S 99.859539°E

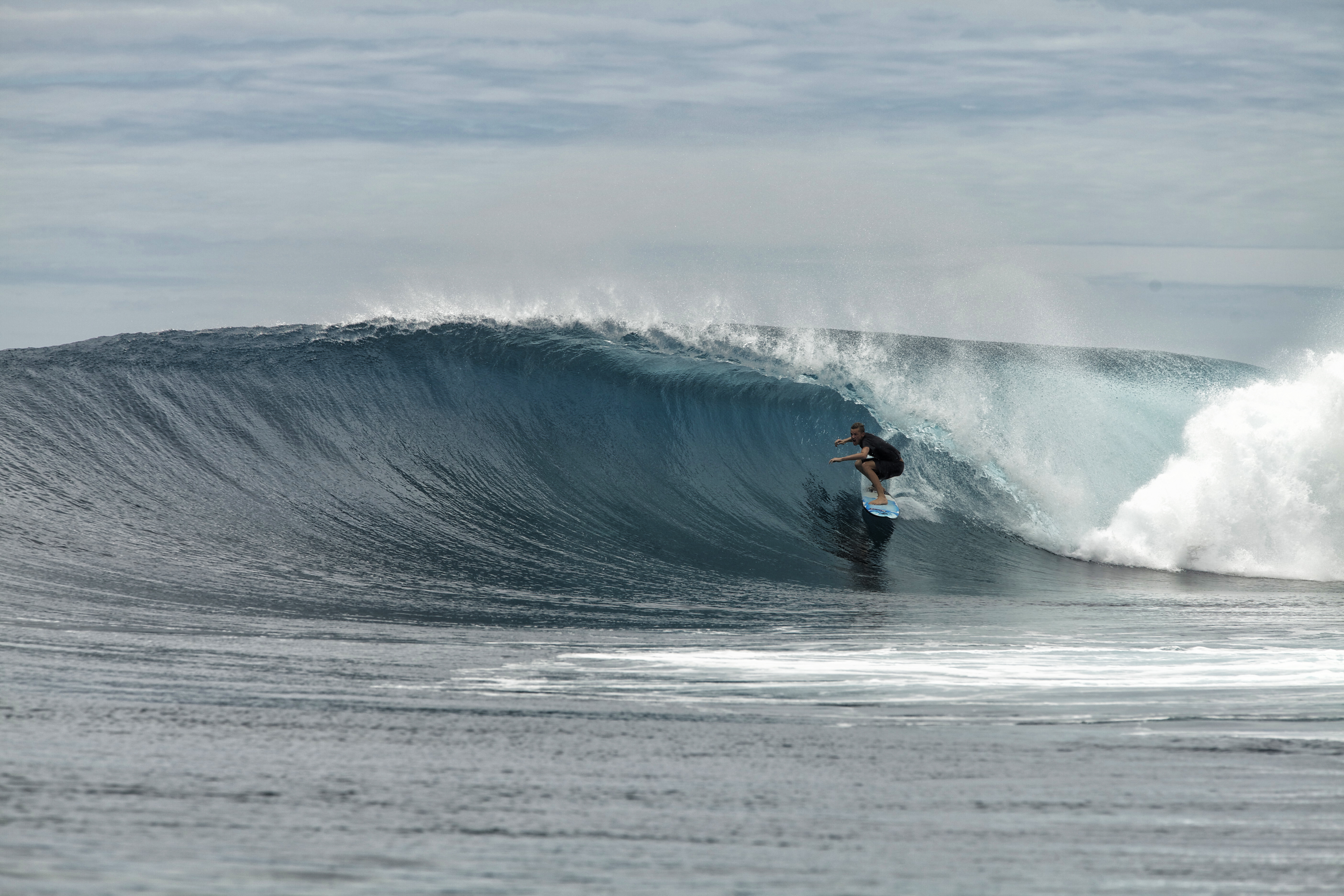
Surfer at Lance's Right, Mentawai Islands, Indonesia

Lance's Right (also known as HTs) is a surf reef break located in Indonesia, off Sipore Island, part of Sumatra's Mentawai Island chain. A reef break is an area in the ocean where waves start to break once they reach the shallows of a reef.

== Origin of the name ==
Lance’s Right is a ‘righthander’ — which means the wave breaks from right to left from the perspective of a watcher on shore. The break, along with the neighbouring left (Lance's Left) are named after the first person to surf both waves, Lance Knight. The other name, HTs, is an abbreviation for Hollow Trees, because of a hollow tree that was on the point but has since washed away.

Lance Knight is an Australian shipmaster & surf explorer who in 1990 set off to Indonesia in search of a ship to supply Lord Howe Island in New South Wales, Australia. Born in the United Kingdom, his father served as a technical officer of the Royal Navy fleet carrier HMS Indefatigable (R10) which had operated in Sumatra with 1st Aircraft Carrier Squadron of the British Pacific Fleet during the Second World War.

In March, 1991, Lance was founded surfing alone by the crew of the Indies Trader — with Martin Daly naming the waves in honour of the first person to them.

== Specifics of the break ==
The break at Lance's Right is a deceptively shallow reef, with an inside section known as the "surgeon's table", for the common injuries that happen to surfers who get stuck and cut on the flat section of the reef. The end section is known as The Cage, where many photographers sit in boats and take photos of the surfers.

== Competitions ==
In April 2016, the Rip Curl Mentawai Pro was held as a World Surf League (WSL) and Asian Surfing Championship (ASC) event at Lance's Right. Australian Chris Zaffis won the title, beating Indonesian surfer Dede Suryana in the final round.

The event had also been previously won in 2013 by Sumbawa local and professional surfer, Oney Anwar.
