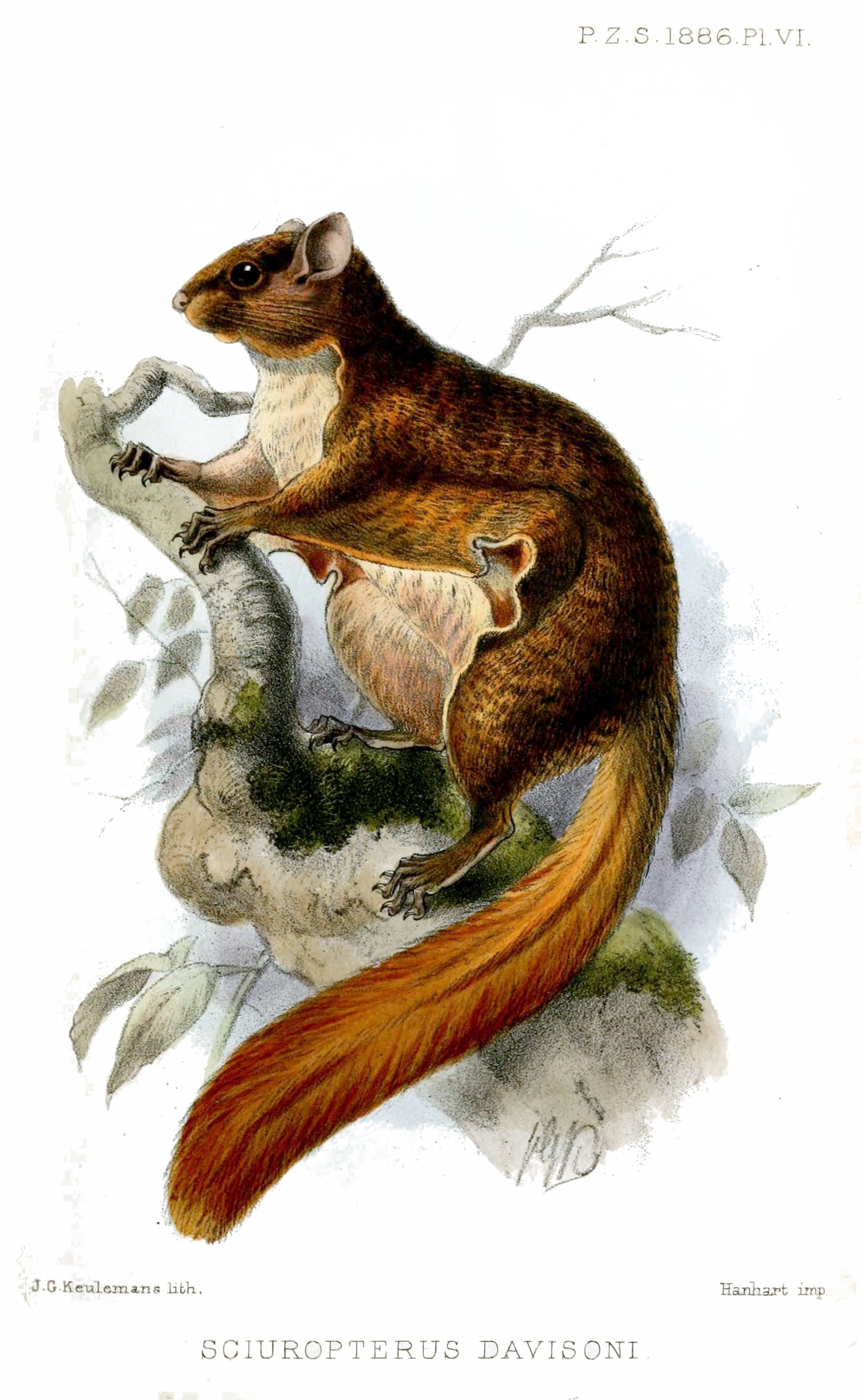
- I. h. davisoni

Conservation status
- Least Concern (IUCN 3.1)

Scientific classification
- Kingdom: Animalia
- Phylum: Chordata
- Class: Mammalia
- Order: Rodentia
- Family: Sciuridae
- Genus: Iomys
- Species: I. horsfieldii

Binomial name
- Iomys horsfieldii (Waterhouse, 1838)

= Javanese flying squirrel =

Species of rodent

The Javanese flying squirrel (Iomys horsfieldii) is a species of rodent in the family Sciuridae. It is found in Indonesia, Malaysia, and Singapore.
