= 2007 Sumatra earthquakes =

2007 Sumatra earthquakes may refer to:

- March 2007 Sumatra earthquakes

== See also ==
- 2007 Bengkulu earthquakes
- List of earthquakes in Indonesia
