= Martin Daly (captain) =

Captain of the Indies Trader during its surf exploration trips

Captain Martin Daly
- Martin Daly looking out from the Wheelhouse of the M.V. Indies Trader
- Born: May 25, 1957 (age 68); Sydney, Australia
- Occupations: Captain, Surfer
- Known for: Captain of MV Indies Trader

Martin Daly (born 1957) is an Australian Captain and surfer who is known for his surf discoveries aboard the M.V. Indies Trader and is known as "surfing's most iconic boat captain".

== Early life ==
Martin Ralph Daly was born on the northern beaches of Sydney, but moved to Queensland at age 11 where surfing isn't possible. By age 16, he left home and lived in New Zealand. By 1981, he left to South East Asia doing marine diving jobs. In 1981, he worked with friends Jeff Chitty and Ross Hannon, and they began working with a salvage diver and boat captain, Dave Barnett, on his boat The Rader.

== Surf Exploration ==
=== One Palm Point Discovery ===
In April 1983, Martin and his friends Jeff Chitty, Ross Hannon, Robert Wilson, and Wylie convinced Dave Barnett to explore some potential surf breaks aboard The Rader, and found waves at Painatan, in Sunda, Indonesia. Martin paddled out alone and caught the first known wave at the surf break. They called it One Palm Point, because there was one palm tree in front of the line where surfers would take off.

=== The M.V. Indies Trader ===
In 1990, with Dave Barnett's boat, The Rader, falling into disrepair, and trouble with local authorities off of disputes of treasure the crew found, Martin borrowed money from everyone he could, and purchased The Rader from Dave Barnett. Renaming a boat is known as bad-luck to sailors, so he kept the original Rader name, by adding Indies T-Rader. He painted it blue to disguise it, and was the now registered as the M.V. Indies Trader.

=== Lance's Right ===
In 1991, Lance Knight hired a local man in a canoe to explore the Mentawai Island chain, and found a surf break. After a couple weeks of surfing it alone, Martin Daly and the Indies Trader stumbled upon Lance, and Martin named the break "Lance's Right" after him. One of the crew had betamax video footage of this encounter, was not shown publicly until 2009.

=== The Quiksilver Crossing ===
Supported by the United Nations, Quiksilver organized a seven-year trip around the world, discovering new surf breaks, as well as checking on the coral health around the globe. The Crossing has been heralded as one of the most groundbreaking moments in surf history. The voyage took them to 56 countries and 26 states and four territories, they discovered more than 115 new surf breaks, as well as going over 160,000 nautical miles, the equivalent of circumnavigating the world 8 times.

== Film and TV Appearances ==
Martin Daly, and his boat Indies Trader boats have been featured in many surf movies and TV shows.

- Young Guns 2, Quiksilver (2005)
- Waterman (2008)
- Minor Threat Series, Red Bull (2011)
- Em Busca do Último Paraíso, Canal Off (2014-2015)
- Proximity, Taylor Steele (2017)
- Sea of Darkness, Michael Oblowitz (unreleased)
- Nuclear Sharks, Heather O'Neill (2016)
