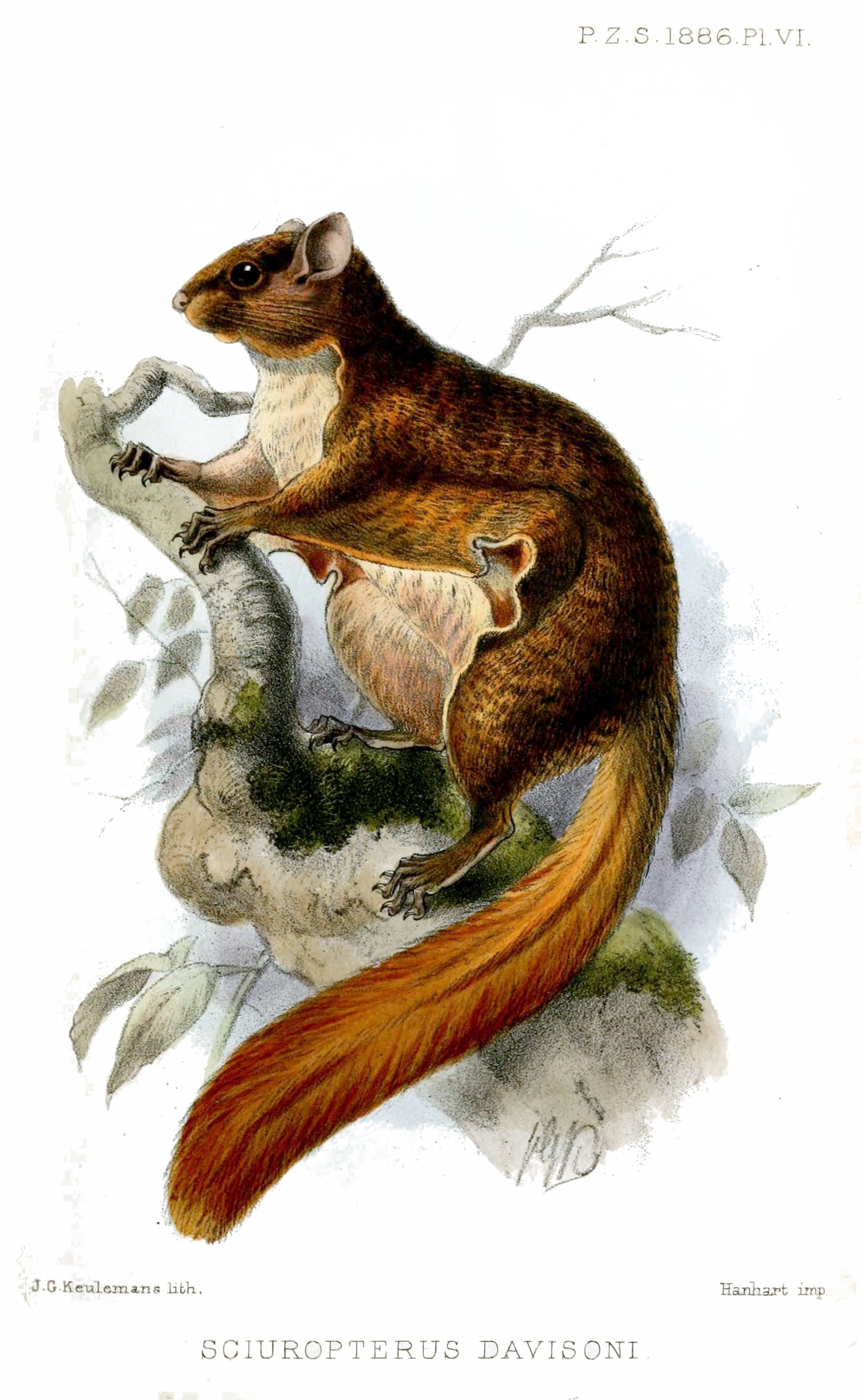
- Javanese flying squirrel (Iomys horsfieldii)

Scientific classification
- Domain: Eukaryota
- Kingdom: Animalia
- Phylum: Chordata
- Class: Mammalia
- Order: Rodentia
- Family: Sciuridae
- Subfamily: Sciurinae
- Tribe: Pteromyini
- Genus: Iomys; Thomas, 1908

Type species
- Pteromys horsfieldi Waterhouse, 1838

Species
- I. horsfieldii I. sipora

= Iomys =

Genus of rodents

Iomys is a small genus of rodent in the family Sciuridae. Its two species are:

- Javanese flying squirrel (Iomys horsfieldii)
- Mentawi flying squirrel (Iomys sipora)
