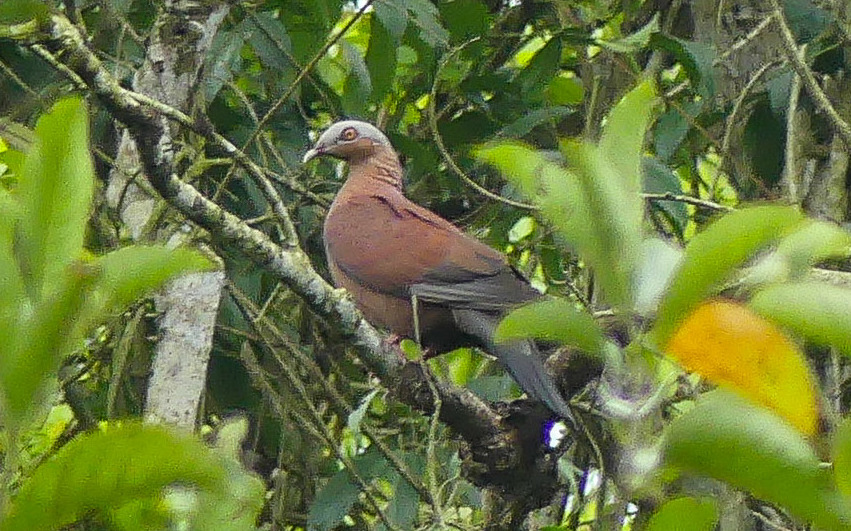

Conservation status
- Vulnerable (IUCN 3.1)

Scientific classification
- Kingdom: Animalia
- Phylum: Chordata
- Class: Aves
- Order: Columbiformes
- Family: Columbidae
- Genus: Columba
- Species: C. punicea

Binomial name
- Columba punicea Blyth, 1842

Synonyms
- Alsocomus puniceus

= Pale-capped pigeon =

Species of bird

The pale-capped pigeon (Columba punicea), also known as the purple wood pigeon, is a species of large pigeon that is found patchily distributed in parts of the Indian subcontinent and Southeast Asia. It has a slow flight and spends a lot of time sitting still in the foliage of large fruiting trees, often in riverine forest on the plains. It is mainly brown above and chestnut below with the a sheen of green or amethyst. Males have a whitish grey cap while females have a brownish grey cap and less gloss on the feathers. They are frugivores, foraging in small groups in the canopy of trees but sometimes descending to the ground for seeds and fallen fruit.

== Description ==
This large 36–40.5 cm-long pigeon is all-dark chestnut brown with a contrasting pale crown. The male has whitish-grey crown, purplish-maroon upperparts with faint green gloss on the neck; more strongly iridescent mantle and back; dark slate-coloured rump and uppertail-coverts; vinous-brown ear-coverts, throat and underparts[ slaty-grey undertail-coverts; and blackish tail and flight feathers. Females have a more brownish-grey crown. Juveniles initially have the crown colour matching the mantle, duller wing-coverts and scapulars with rufous fringes, a much reduced gloss on the upperparts and greyer underparts. The legs are crimson and iris is creamy-yellow in adults. The skin around the eyes and the ceres are magenta.

Some taxonomists have grouped it along with Columba argentina which are both Old World pigeons that lack patterns on the back of the neck.

== Distribution and habitat ==
The pale-capped pigeon is very locally distributed across its broad range, which encompasses parts of northern and northeastern India, Bangladesh, Myanmar, Thailand, Laos, Cambodia and Vietnam. The type specimen was collected in Chaibasa, Singhbhum, India but relatively few records exist from Peninsular India. Records of the species exist from Maharashtra, Orissa, Bihar and Andhra Pradesh (Araku valley). Observers considered it a seasonal visitor in Sri Lanka. In some parts of Thailand, they are winter visitors and birds have been seen roosting in mangroves far from the mainland.

They are found mainly on the forests of the plains. It frequents a wide variety of habitats from the lowlands up to 1,600 m, chiefly primary or secondary evergreen forest, but also open, deciduous dipterocarp forest, bamboo, and agricultural fields, particularly in close proximity to forest. Mangroves, small forested islands and other coastal habitats are probably only frequented in the non-breeding season. It is mainly frugivorous, although seeds and grain form important dietary components in some areas. Tickell noted that the birds were found in groups of 4 to 5, mainly on Eugenia trees near rivers. They ate the berries of these trees, foraging in the morning and evenings and resting during the heat of the day. Layard noted that they favoured Cinnamon trees. It does not appear to have been common in most of its range. It was said to be common on the island of Koh Mur or Pulau Muntia in western Thailand. Recent records indicate that it now only occurs rarely and erratically within its range.

== Behaviour and ecology ==
These pigeons fly about in small groups, foraging mainly in the morning and evening. They are said to have a low call similar to that of Ducula aenea but shorter and less prolonged. The breeding season is May to August and the flimsy platform nest is placed low down in a tree and one or rarely two eggs are laid.

A species of helminth parasite, Cotugnia joyeuxi Baer, was first collected from this species from a Burmese specimen.
