= Padang Sugihan Wildlife Reserve =

Wildlife sanctuary in Sumatra, Indonesia

Padang-Sugihan Wildlife Reserve
- IUCN category IV (habitat/species management area)
- Location within Sumatra Location within Indonesia
- Location: Sumatra, Indonesia
- Nearest city: Palembang
- Coordinates: 2°57′S 105°12′E
- Area: 750 km^{2} (290 sq mi)
- Established: 1983
- Governing body: Ministry of Forestry

Padang-Sugihan Wildlife Reserve is a Wildlife Sanctuary in Sumatra, Indonesia. The park has a total area of 750 km^{2}, and is located in the province of South Sumatra. Nearly all peat forest within the reserve has been destroyed in the decades since the reserve was created, due to illegal logging and large forest fires.

== Geography ==
The park covers a low-lying area of periodically flooded forests, swamps and grasslands. Habitats when the park was established included peat swamp forest, swampy grassland, riverine swamp forest and drier Melaleuca forest. The peat swamp forest areas flooded through most of the year, while remaining areas of the park flood periodically to a depth of 1–1.5 metres (3.3–4.9 ft).

== Flora and fauna ==
Animals include a herd of the critically endangered Sumatran elephant. Several hundred elephants from surrounding areas that were being deforested or converted for agriculture were driven into the Padang-Sugihan. Other animals recorded in the park include leopard cat, fishing cat, Malayan sun bear, hairy-nosed otter, small-clawed otter, masked palm civet, otter civet, agile gibbon, southern pig-tailed macaque, crab-eating macaque, silvered leaf monkey, greater mouse deer, lesser mouse deer, wild boar, Bornean bearded pig, sambar deer, and previously the critically endangered Sumatran tiger. The reserve is also an important wetland for a number of bird species, including Storm's stork, white-winged duck and the great hornbill.

== Conservation and threats ==
Before the area was set aside for a wetland reserve in April 1983 the area was being prepared for transmigrant settlers. Five large 15-20m wide canals were dug crossing the reserve east to west, with smaller (2-3m wide) north-south secondary canals 2 km in length branching off every 400m. The canals remained open after the reserve was created, providing unofficial access routes and enabling illegal logging, poaching and fishing (including with dynamite) inside the reserve borders. During the 1980s several dozen unlicensed and illegal sawmills were operating on the Padang and Sugihan rivers. By the early 1990s the only remaining fragments of peat swamp forest remaining were in the southern third of the reserve, an area that had not been drained or made accessible by the canals. The draining of the reserve and the illegal logging made the remaining forest more prone to fire, and much of the forest that remained was destroyed by large fires during drought and El Niño years through the rest of the 1990s. Nearly all peat forest in areas surrounding the reserve has also been cleared. The canals through the reserve are also used as shortcut for motorboat traffic between main rivers outside of the reserve, disturbing wildlife.

== See also ==
- List of national parks of Indonesia
- Geography of Indonesia
