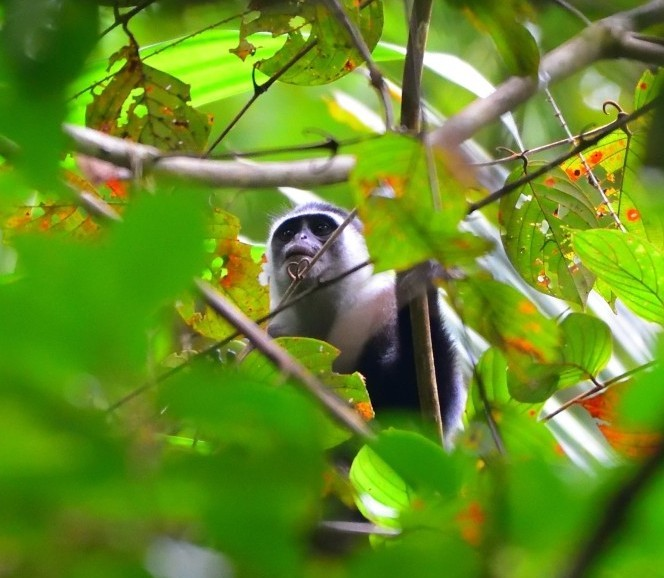

Conservation status
- Endangered (IUCN 3.1)

Scientific classification
- Kingdom: Animalia
- Phylum: Chordata
- Class: Mammalia
- Infraclass: Placentalia
- Order: Primates
- Family: Cercopithecidae
- Genus: Presbytis
- Species: P. siberu

Binomial name
- Presbytis siberu (Chasen and Kloss, 1928)

= Siberut langur =

Species of monkey

The Siberut langur (Presbytis siberu) is a species of monkey in the family Cercopithecidae. It was formerly considered a subspecies of the Mentawai langur, Presbytis potenziani (as Presbytis potenziani siberu), but genetic analysis revealed that these are separate species. The Siberut langur is native to the island of Siberut in Indonesia. It is listed as endangered by the IUCN.
