= Tuapeijat =

Town in West Sumatra, Indonesia

- Town
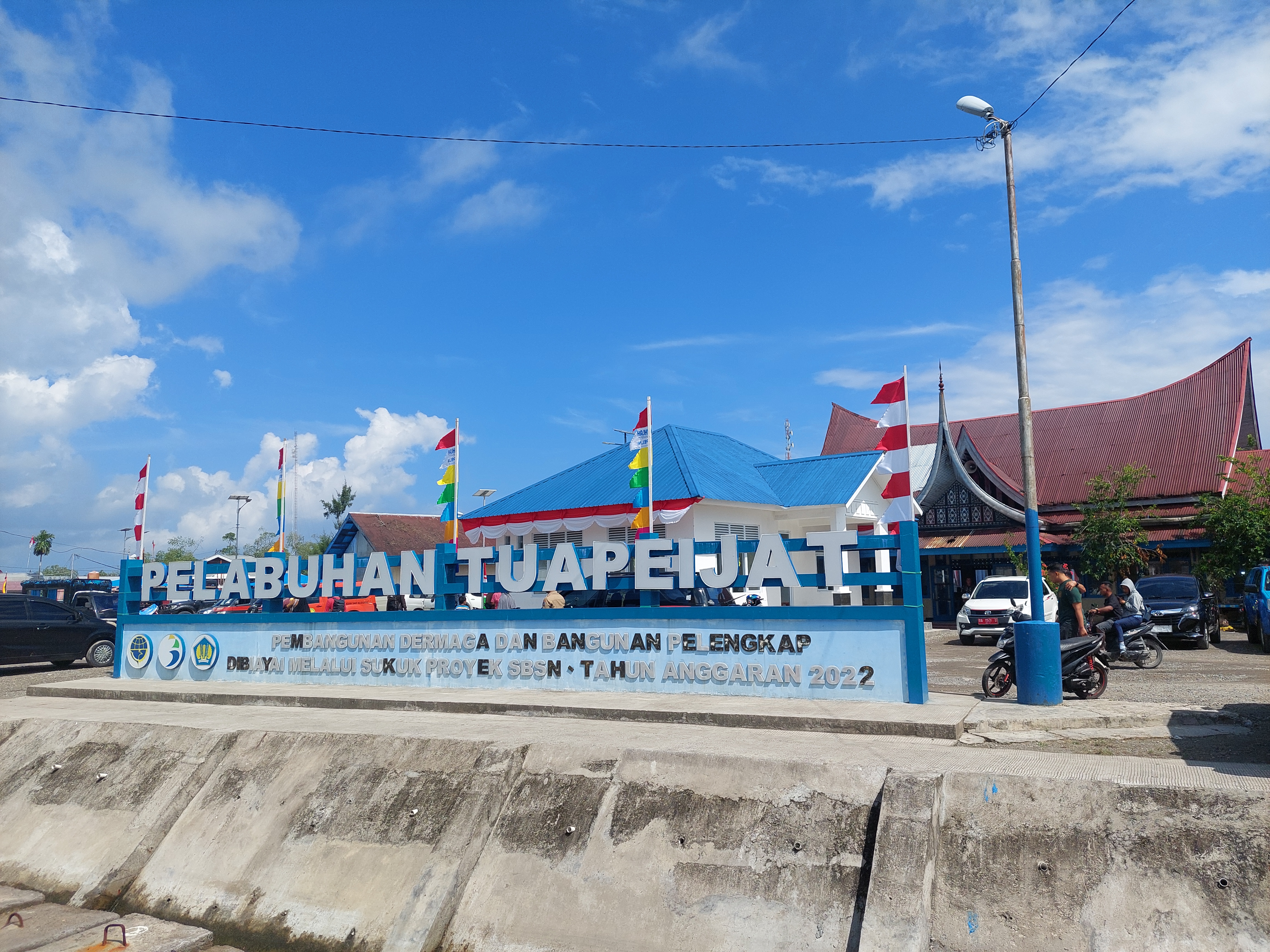
- Tuapejat harbour

- Location within Sumatra
- Coordinates: 2°1′46.7″S 99°35′31.3″E
- Country: Indonesia
- Province: West Sumatra
- Regency: Mentawai Islands
- Subdistrict: North Sipore

Area
  - Total: 86.52 km^{2} (33.41 sq mi)

Population (2024 estimate)
  - Total: 6,642
  - Density: 76.77/km^{2} (198.8/sq mi)
- Time zone: UTC+7 (Western Indonesia Time)
- Postal code: 25392

Tuapeijat (also spelled Tuapejat or Tua Pejat) is a town within North Sipora District (Kecamatan Sipora Utara) in the Mentawai Islands Regency of West Sumatra province of Indonesia and it is the administrative seat (capital) of the Mentawai Islands Regency. The population was 4,344 at the 2010 Census, and the 2024 official estimate gave the population as 6,642, making it the largest town by population in the Mentawai Islands. The town's jurisdiction includes three small islands of Siburu, Silabok and Pototoga in addition to the main town areas on Sipora Island.

== Climate ==
Tuapejat has a tropical rainforest climate (Af) with heavy to very heavy rainfall year-round.

Climate data for Tuapejat
Month	Jan	Feb	Mar	Apr	May	Jun	Jul	Aug	Sep	Oct	Nov	Dec	Year
Mean daily maximum °C (°F)	31.3 (88.3)	31.6 (88.9)	31.5 (88.7)	31.5 (88.7)	31.8 (89.2)	31.5 (88.7)	31.3 (88.3)	31.2 (88.2)	30.7 (87.3)	30.5 (86.9)	30.6 (87.1)	30.7 (87.3)	31.2 (88.1)
Daily mean °C (°F)	26.9 (80.4)	27.0 (80.6)	27.0 (80.6)	27.2 (81.0)	27.4 (81.3)	26.9 (80.4)	26.7 (80.1)	26.6 (79.9)	26.6 (79.9)	26.5 (79.7)	26.7 (80.1)	26.6 (79.9)	26.8 (80.3)
Mean daily minimum °C (°F)	22.6 (72.7)	22.5 (72.5)	22.6 (72.7)	23.0 (73.4)	23.0 (73.4)	22.3 (72.1)	22.1 (71.8)	22.1 (71.8)	22.5 (72.5)	22.6 (72.7)	22.8 (73.0)	22.6 (72.7)	22.6 (72.6)
Average rainfall mm (inches)	295 (11.6)	222 (8.7)	250 (9.8)	275 (10.8)	202 (8.0)	204 (8.0)	210 (8.3)	255 (10.0)	334 (13.1)	396 (15.6)	418 (16.5)	361 (14.2)	3,422 (134.6)
Source: Climate-Data.org
