= North Pagai =

Island in West Sumatra, Indonesia

Native name: Pagai Utara
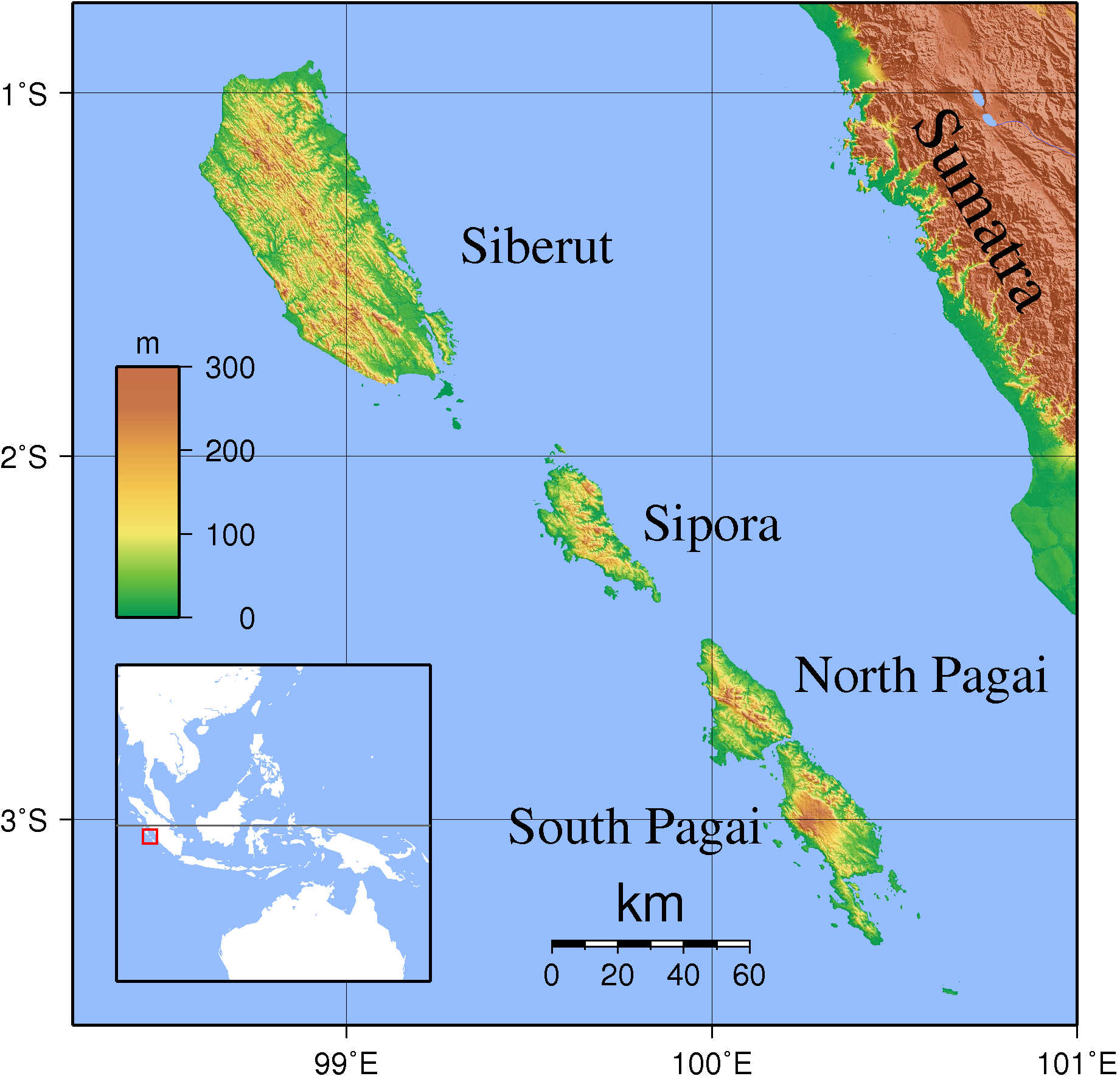

Geography
- Location: South East Asia
- Coordinates: 2°42′S 100°5′E
- Archipelago: Mentawai Islands
- Area: 603.44 km^{2} (232.99 sq mi)

Administration
- Indonesia
- Province: West Sumatra
- Regency: Mentawai Islands

Demographics
- Population: 17,773 (mid 2024 estimate)
- Pop. density: 29.45/km^{2} (76.28/sq mi)
- Ethnic groups: Mentawai

North Pagai (Indonesian: Pagai Utara) is the smallest of the four principal Mentawai Islands off the west coast of Sumatra in Indonesia. It is south of Sipora and north of South Pagai (or Pagai Selatan) Island.

The population figure given for North Pagai in the box to the right is the combined figure for North Pagai District and Sikakap District. The main part of Sikakap District covers the southern part of North Pagai Island, but it also includes the northern part of South Pagai Island, together with various small islands in the strait between the two; however, all three villages within the District (Sikakap town, Taikako, and Matobe) lie on North Pagai Island. The town of Sikakap was used as a centre for relief operations related to the 2010 Mentawai earthquake and tsunami.

== Surf breaks ==
- Silabus
- Macca's
- Macca's Right
- Bommie Peak
- Gilligans
