= South Pagai =

Island in West Sumatra, Indonesia

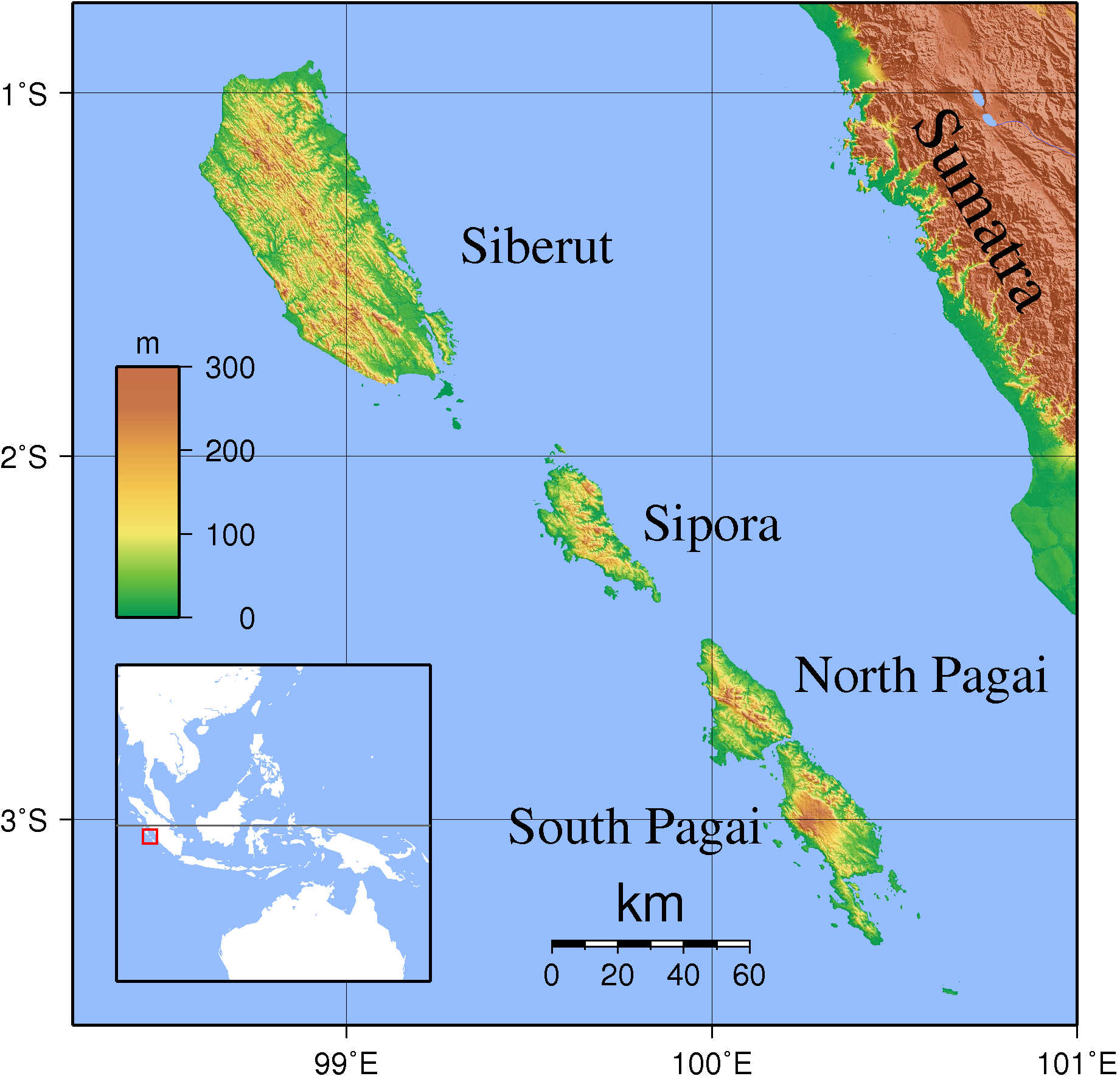

Geography
- Location: South East Asia
- Coordinates: 3°00′S 100°20′E
- Archipelago: Mentawai Islands
- Area: 851.28 km^{2} (328.68 sq mi)

Administration
- Indonesia
- Province: West Sumatra
- Regency: Mentawai Islands

Demographics
- Population: 10,575 (mid 2024 estimate)
- Pop. density: 12.42/km^{2} (32.17/sq mi)

South Pagai (Indonesian: Pagai Selatan) is one of the Mentawai Islands of the west coast of Sumatra in Indonesia. The island is south of North Pagai (or Pagai Utara) Island. The population figure given for South Pagai (box to the right) refers to South Pagai District alone. The largely unpopulated south portion of Sikakap District covers the northern part of South Pagai Island, as well as various small islands in the strait between the two islands (the rest of Sikakap District, with almost all of its district population, forms the southern part of North Pagai Island).

The September 2007 Sumatra earthquakes were located near these islands, producing coastal uplift, enlarging nearby islands and even producing six new ones. The 2010 Mentawai earthquake and tsunami also struck off its southwest coast, causing a tsunami.

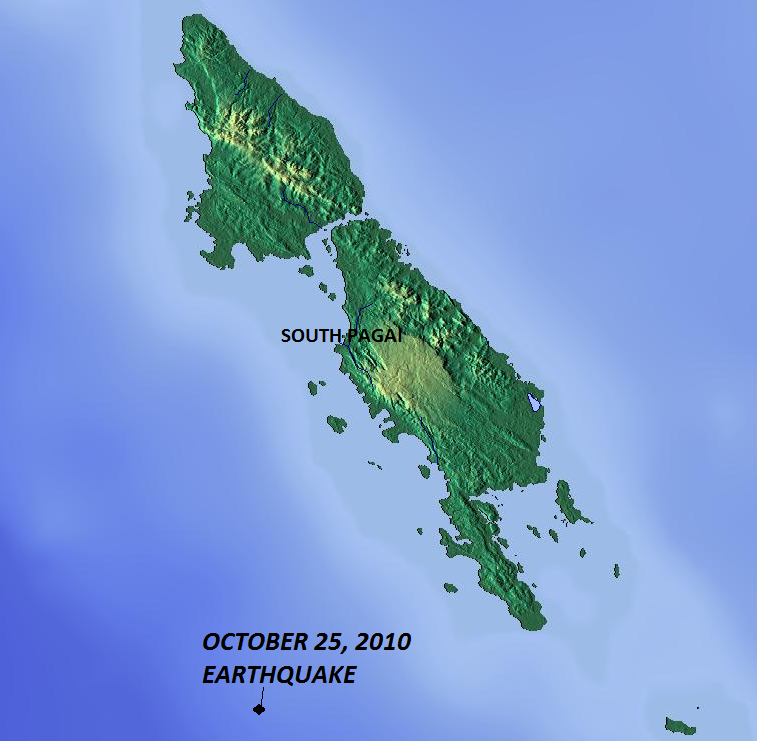
2010 Mentawai earthquake and tsunami

== Surf breaks ==
South Pagai and its surrounding outer islands include surf breaks. The surf breaks in this region were affected during the 2007 seismic event where the reefs raised approximately 6 feet in the southernmost tip of Mentawai. Due to this, the surf breaks were altered, and new surf breaks were added.

The breaks in the area include:

- "Roxy's Right" (a.k.a. Coldsprings),
- "Rag's Left",
- "Rag's Right",
- "Buddha's Left",
- "Thunders Left",
- "Thunders Right",
- "Yellowstones Left and Right"(a.k.a. "IDK's" a.k.a. "Dracula's"),
- "Bangkok's Left",
- "Lighthouse Rights",
- "McFrights Left" (a.k.a. "Hole"),
- "Moots",
- "Sneaky Peak",
- "Meat Locker"

Breaks are currently accessible by surf charter boat only, and due to the distance required to travel to the South Pagai region, they are frequented by few operators.
