= Sipora =

Island in West Sumatra, Indonesia

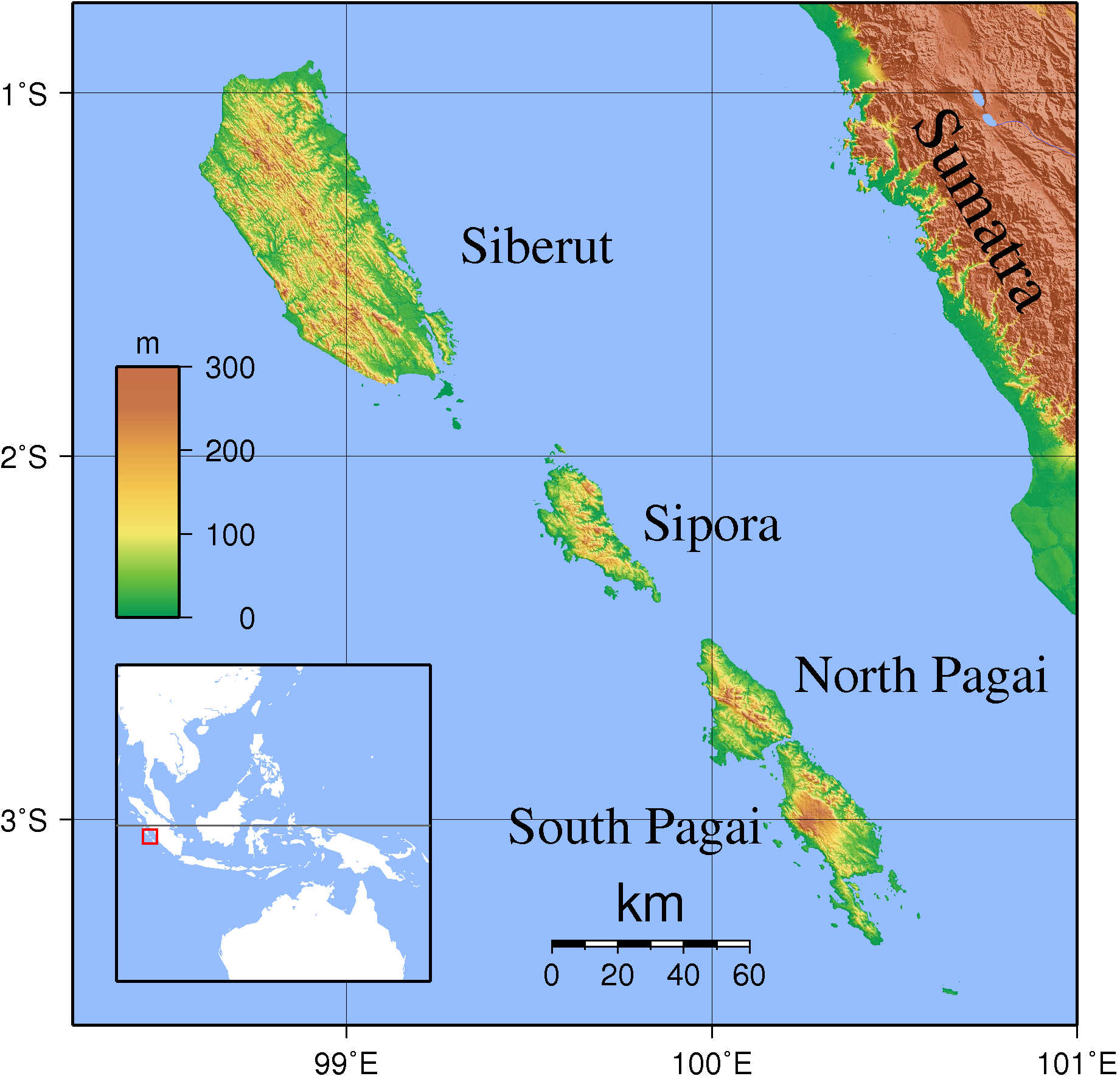

Geography
- Location: Southeast Asia
- Coordinates: 2°11′S 99°38′E
- Archipelago: Mentawai Islands
- Area: 620.73 km^{2} (239.67 sq mi)

Administration
- Indonesia
- Province: West Sumatra
- Regency: Mentawai Islands

Demographics
- Population: 24,655 (mid 2024 estimate)
- Pop. density: 39.72/km^{2} (102.87/sq mi)

Sipora (Indonesian: Sipora or sometimes spelled Sipura) located off Sumatra in the West Sumatra Province of Indonesia, is the second-smallest and most developed of the four Mentawai Islands at only 620.73 km^{2}. It had a population of 17,557 at the 2010 Census and 21,901 at the 2020 Census; the official estimate as at mid 2024 was 24,655. The regency capital of the Mentawai Islands, Tuapejat, is found on Sipora. An estimated 10-15% of the original rainforest remains on this island.

Sipora is a surfing destination. Surf spots Lance's Right and Lance's Left break off the southern end of the island – named after the man who found them, Australian surfer Lance Knight. Surf spots break in the northwestern region of this island including Telescopes, Iceland, and Scarecrows. The ocean swells are most consistent from April to October, but Sipora is a viable year-round surfing destination. Wind conditions can vary by the hour, and are often calm and glassy. For accommodation near Sipora, most surfers stay on yachts that can be chartered in Padang and motor between surf breaks as conditions change. Some visiting surfers choose to stay on the island itself at resorts or with local families in Tuapejat.

The islands of North Pagai (Pagai Utara) and South Pagai (Pagai Selatan) are situated to the south, and also have surf breaks along their western coasts. The fourth and largest of the Mentawai Islands – Siberut – is situated to the north of Sipora, from which it is separated by the Bunga Laut Strait.

== Surf breaks ==
Northern:

- Iceland
- Telescopes
- Scarecrows

Western:

- Arik
- Seven palm point

Southern:

- Lance's Left and Lance's Right (HT'S).

== See also ==
- List of islands of Indonesia
