= Mentawai Islands Regency =

Regency in West Sumatra, Indonesia

Mentawai Islands Regency Kabupaten Kepulauan Mentawai
- Regency
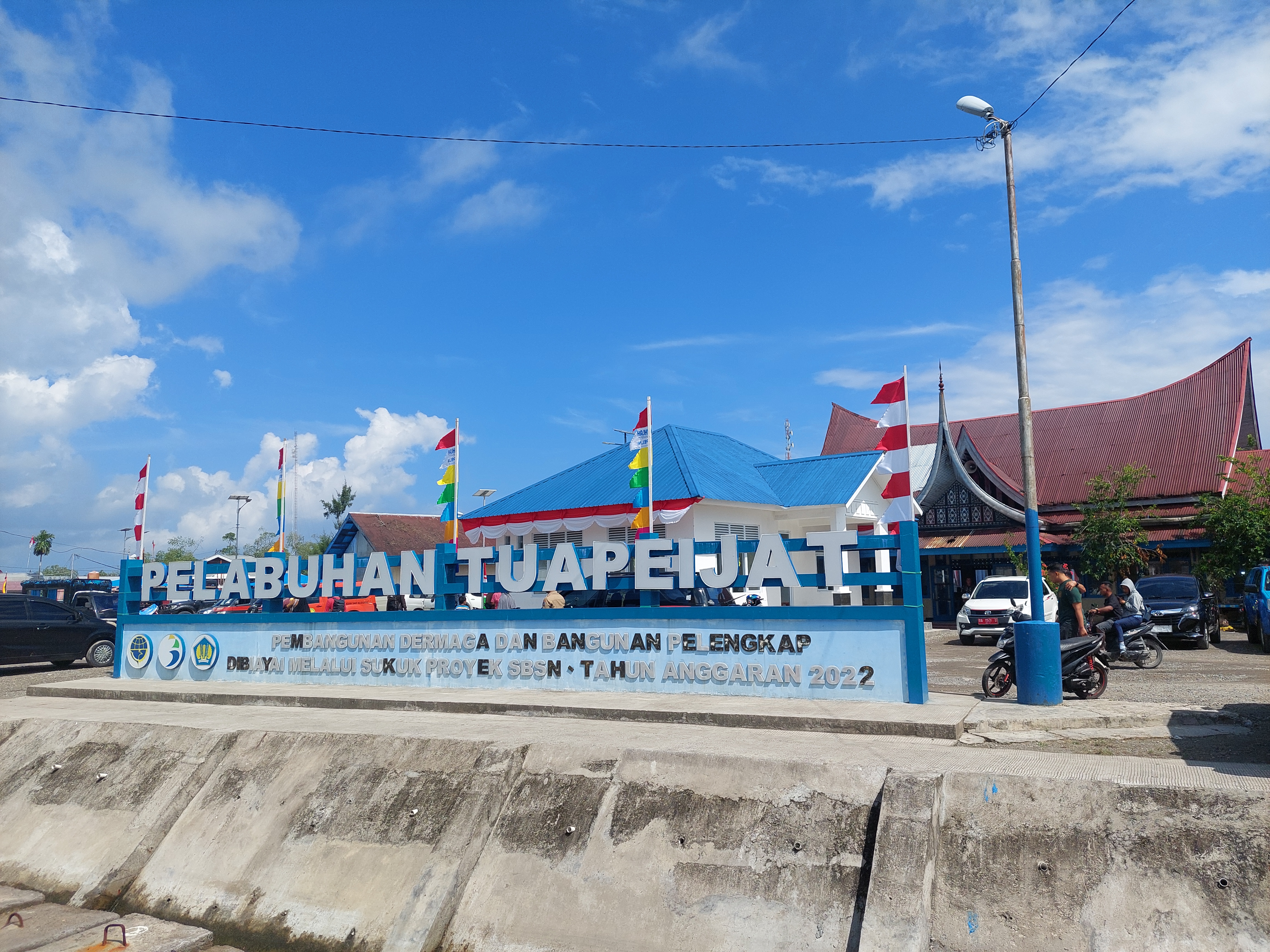
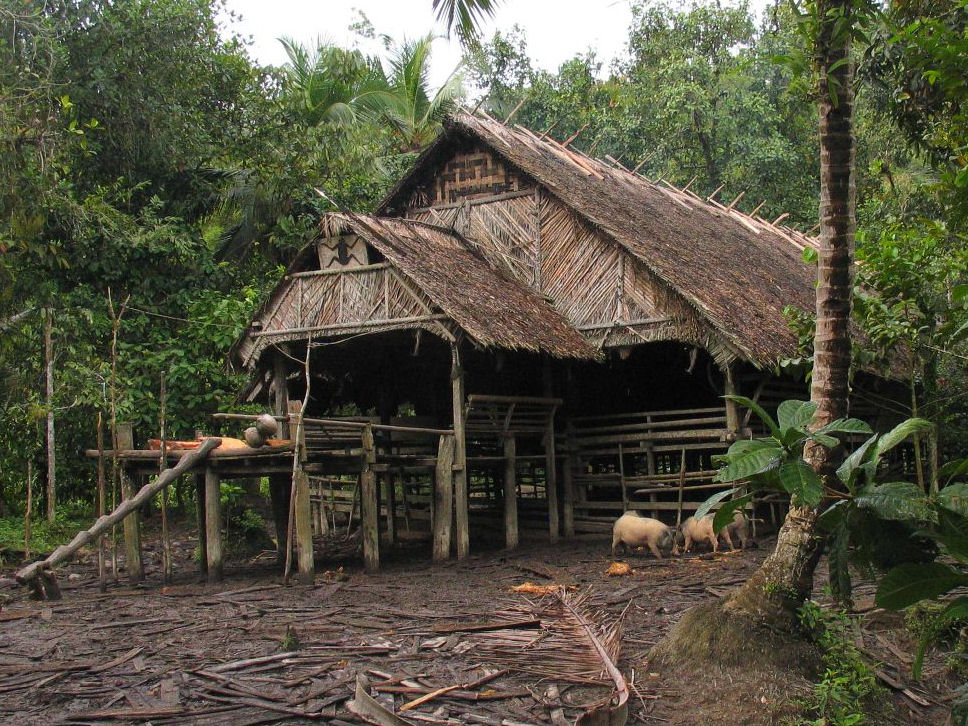
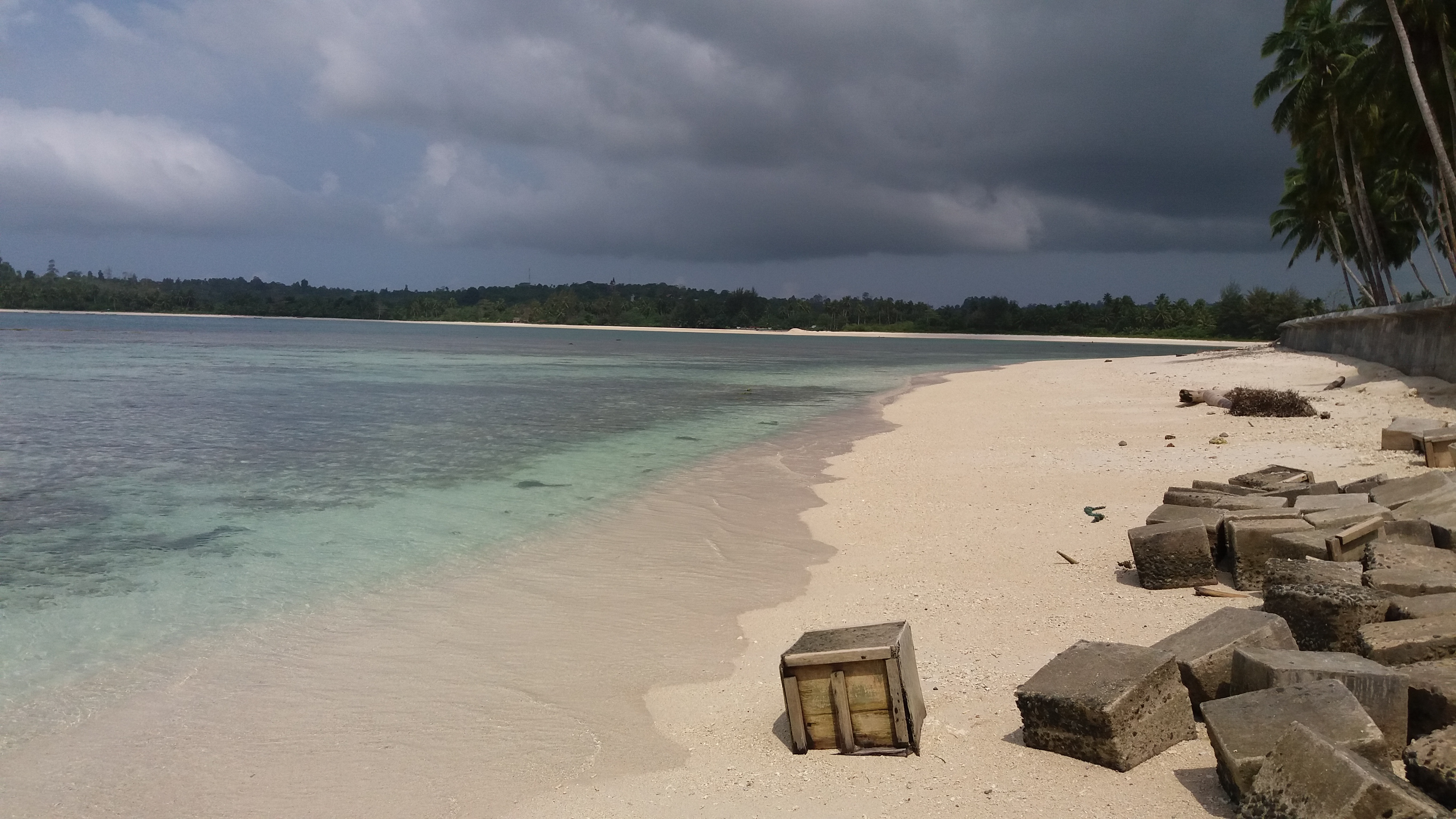
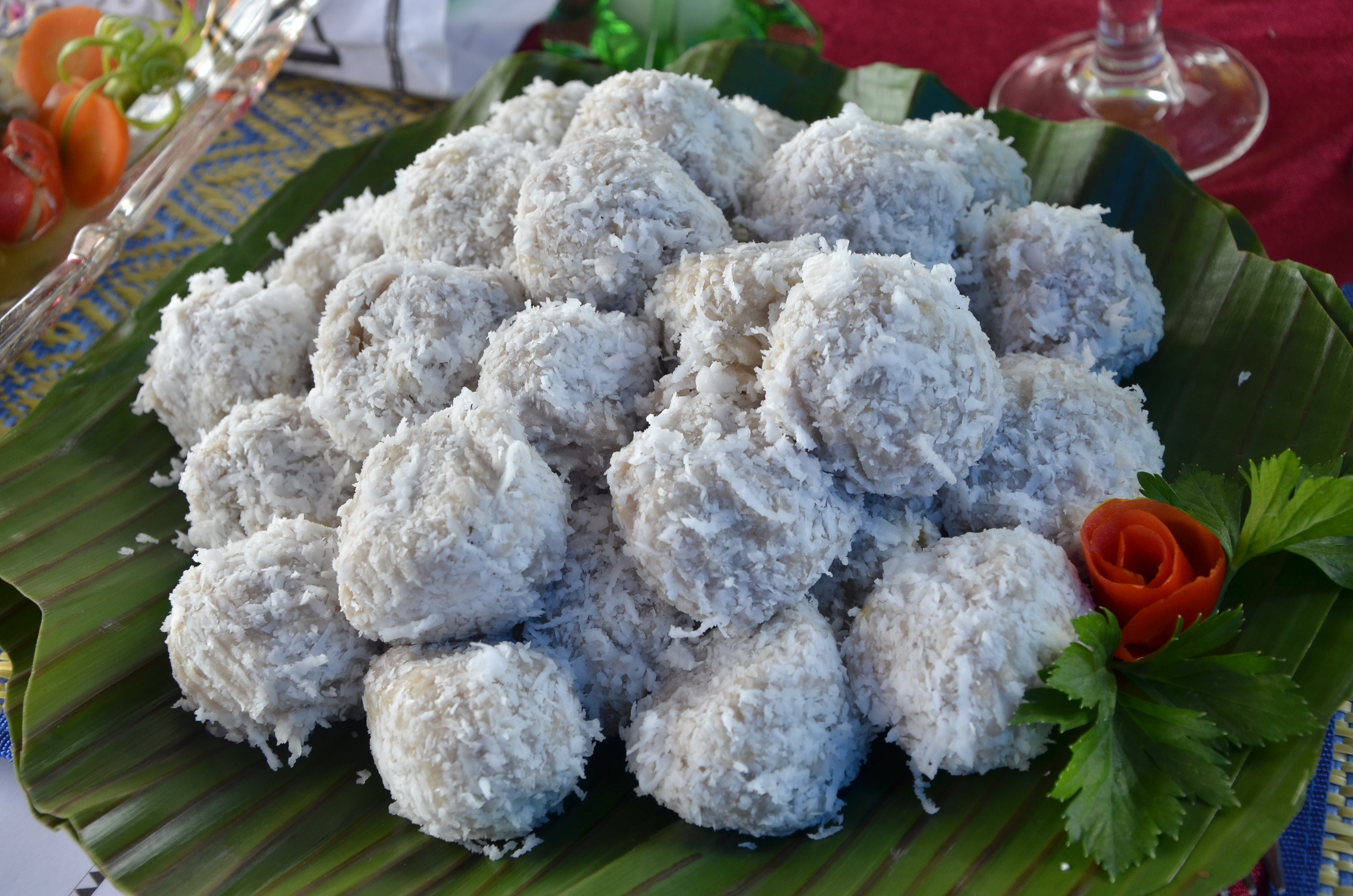
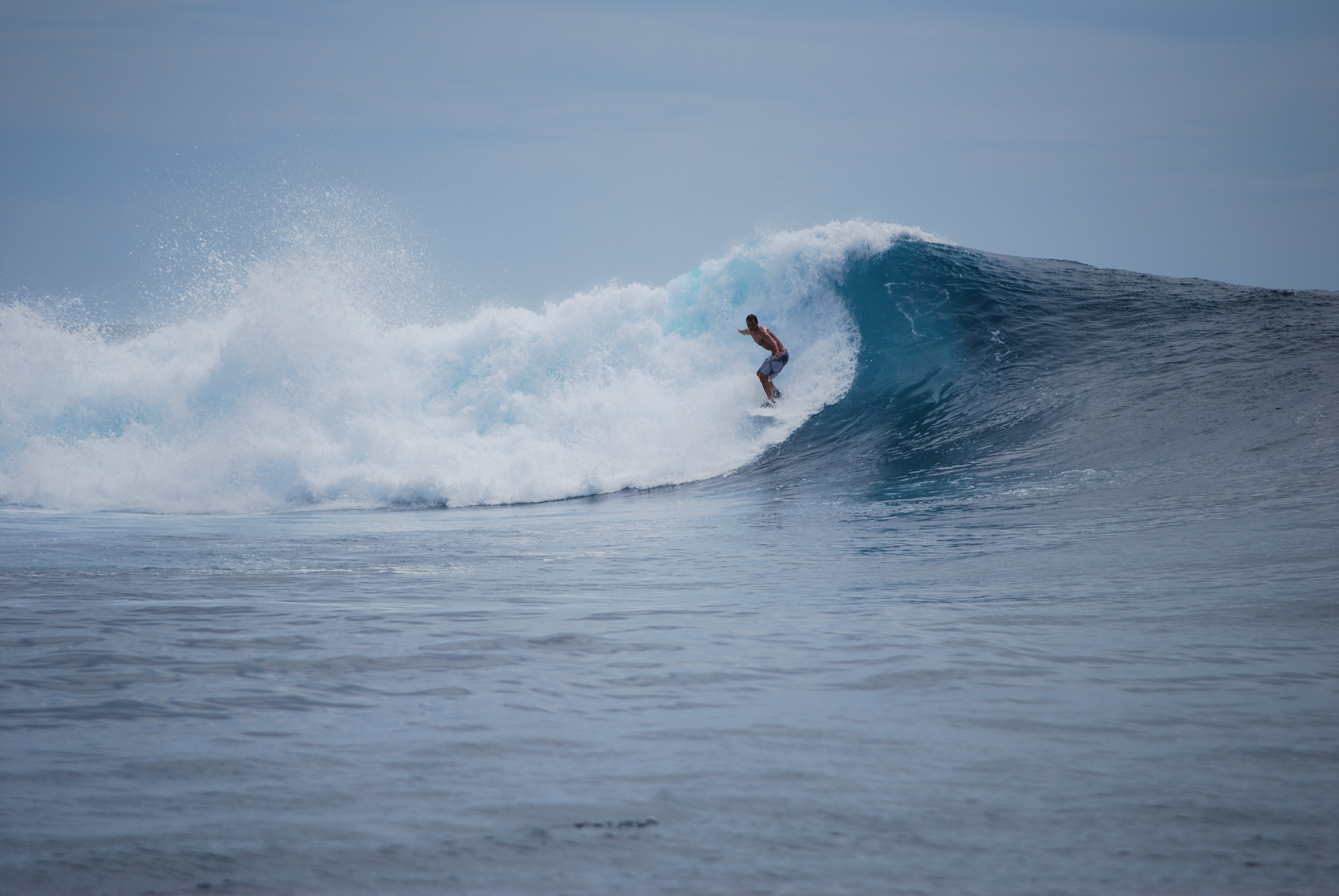
- From top to bottom: Tuapejat Harbor, Traditional Mentawai House Uma , Jati Beach Tuapejat, Subbet - Typical Mentawai Food, Surfers explore the Mentawai islands.

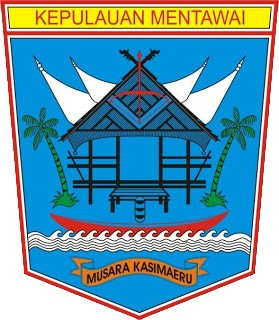
- Coat of arms
- Motto(s): Musara Kasimaeru (Mentawai) (Together for Goodness)
- Location within West Sumatra

- Location in Sumatra and Indonesia Mentawai Islands Regency (Indonesia)
- Coordinates: 2°11′S 99°39′E
- Country: Indonesia
- Province: West Sumatra
- Regency seat: Tua Pejat

Government
  - Regent: Rinto Wardana
  - Vice Regent: Jakop Saguruk

Area
  - Total: 6,033.76 km^{2} (2,329.65 sq mi)

Population (2025 estimate)
  - Total: 99,810
  - Density: 16.54/km^{2} (42.84/sq mi)

Demographics
  - Religion: Christianity 76.98%: Protestantism 48.06%; Catholicism 28.92%; Islam 22.82% Others 0.19%
- Time zone: UTC+7 (Indonesia Western Standard Time)
- Area code: (+62) 759
- Website: mentawaikab.go.id

The Mentawai Islands Regency is a regency of West Sumatra Province which consists of a chain of about a hundred islands and islets approximately 150 km (93 mi) off the western coast of Sumatra in Indonesia. They cover a land area of 6,033.76 km^{2} (2,329.65 sq mi) and had a population of 76,173 at the 2010 Census and 87,623 at the 2020 Census; the official estimate as of mid 2025 was 99,810 (comprising 51,861 males and 47,949 females).

Siberut at 3,877.9 km^{2} (1,497 sq mi) is the largest of the islands, occupying 64.27% of the land area of the regency. The other major islands are Sipura (or Sipora), North Pagai (Pagai Utara), and South Pagai (Pagai Selatan). The islands lie off the Sumatran coast, across the Mentawai Strait. The indigenous inhabitants of the islands are known as the Mentawai people. The Mentawai Islands have become a noted destination for surfing, with over 40 boats offering surf charters to international guests.

== Administrative districts ==
The Mentawai Islands have been administered as a regency within the West Sumatra (Sumatera Barat) province since 1999. The regency seat is Tua Pejat, on the island of Sipora. Padang, the capital of the province, lies on the Sumatran mainland opposite Siberut. The regency is divided into ten districts (kecamatan), tabulated below from south to north with their areas and their populations at the 2010 Census and the 2020 Census, together with the official estimates as of mid 2025. The table also includes the locations of the district administrative centres, the number of villages (all classed as rural desa) and the number of named offshore islands in each district, and its postcode.

Name of District (kecamatan)	English Name	Area in km^{2}	Pop'n 2010 Census	Pop'n 2020 Census	Pop'n mid 2025 Estimate	Admin centre	No. of villages	No. of islands	Post code
Pagai Selatan	South Pagai	851.28	8,782	9,373	10,736	Bulasat	4	31	25391
Sikakap ^{(a)}	Central Pagai	312.60	9,531	10,219	11,318	Taikako	3	8	25399
Pagai Utara	North Pagai	371.25	5,212	6,031	6,675	Saumanganya	3	9	25390
Sipora Selatan	South Sipora	348.33	8,460	9,812	10,932	Sioban	7	3	25392
Sipora Utara	North Sipora	272.40	9,097	11,968	14,441	Sido Makmur	6	12	25398
Siberut Barat Daya	Southwest Siberut	1,013.83	6,069	7,058	8,266	Pasakiat Taileleu	3	17	25393
Siberut Selatan	South Siberut	328.00	8,446	9,933	11,317	Muara Siberut	5	1	25397
Siberut Tengah	Central Siberut	589.75	6,069	7,089	8,048	Saibi Samukop	3	5	25396
Siberut Utara	North Siberut	782.68	7,774	8,337	9,440	Muara Sikabaluan	6	4	25395
Siberut Barat	West Siberut	1,163.64	6,733	7,803	8,637	Simalegi	3	1	25394
Totals		6,033.76	76,173	87,623	99,810	Tuapejat	43	111	

Note: (a) Sikakap District covers the northern part of South Pagai Island and the southern part of North Pagai Island, plus some intervening small islands. Of its three desa, Matobek is entirely on North Pagai Island, while Sikakap and Taikato are mainly on North Pagai Island but each includes areas on South Pagai as well as the intervening small islands.

=== Villages ===
The ten districts comprise forty-three rural villages (desa) listed below with their areas and their populations as officially estimated for mid 2024:

Kode Wilayah	Name of desa	Area in km^{2}	Pop'n Estimate mid 2024	Notes on location
13.09.10.2001	Sinaka (Sinakak)	265.87	2,532	
13.09.10.2002	Bulasat	224.00	2,759	
13.09.10.2003	Malakopa (Malakopak)	127.63	2,837	
13.09.10.2004	Makalo	233.78	2,447	
13.09.10	Totals Pagai Selatan District	851.28	10,575	
13.09.09.2001	Sikakap	35.82	5,419	The village itself is on North Pagai Island, but most of its territory is on South Pagai Island.
13.09.09.2002	Taikako	168.20	3,559	The village itself is on North Pagai Island, but some of its territory is on South Pagai Island or on small islands between the two.
13.09.09.2003	Matobe (Matobek)	108.59	2,178	Situated entirely on North Pagai Island, on the island's east coast.
13.09.09	Totals Sikakap District	312.60	11,156	
13.09.01.2007	Betumonga	76.91	1,333	
13.09.01.2008	Silabu	97.63	1,334	
13.09.01.2009	Saumanganya	196.72	3,950	
13.09.01	Totals Pagai Utara District	371.25	6,617	
13.09.02.2001	Bosua	40.78	1,848	
13.09.02.2002	Beriulou	78.93	1,103	
13.09.02.2003	Nemnemleleu	46.91	1,493	
13.09.02.2004	Mara	62.27	1,224	
13.09.02.2006	Sioban	16.75	2,355	
13.09.02.2007	Matobe	23.62	1,305	
13.09.02.2008	Saureinu	79.47	1,543	
13.09.02	Totals Sipora Selatan District	348.33	10,781	
13.09.08.2001	Betumonga	110.58	1,381	On southwest coast of Sipora.
13.09.08.2002	Goisooinan	56.07	1,274	
13.09.08.2003	Tuapejat	86.52	6,642	
13.09.08.2004	Sido Makmur	6.07	1,001	
13.09.08.2005	Bukit Pamewa	7.72	858	
13.09.08.2006	Sipora Jaya	5.44	2,718	
13.09.08	Totals Sipora Utara District	272.40	13,874	
13.09.06.2001	Katurei	128.35	2,498	Actually situated on the southeast of the island, south of Muara Siberut.
13.09.06.2002	Sagulubbeg	469.47	1,836	On south section of the west coast.
13.09.06.2003	Pasakiat Taileleu	416.00	3,717	The southernmost village on Siterup, includes small islands off the south coast
13.09.06	Totals Siberut Barat Daya District	1,013.83	8,051	
13.09.03.2002	Muara Siberut	17.75	3,322	
13.09.03.2003	Maileppet	18.77	1,887	A coastal village, north of Muara Siberut.
13.09.03.2004	Muntei	90.94	1,868	An inland village, west from Maileppet.
13.09.03.2005	Matotonan	85.65	1,358	An inland village, further west.
13.09.03.2007	Madobag	114.89	2,607	An inland village, also further west.
13.09.03	Totals Siberut Selatan District	328.00	11,042	
13.09.07.2001	Saibi Samukop	230.63	3,784	
13.09.07.2002	Cimpungan	93.84	1,271	
13.09.07.2003	Saliguma	265.28	2,837	
13.09.07	Totals Siberut Tengah District	589.75	7,892	
13.09.04.2003	Bojakan	263.04	1,213	
13.09.04.2004	Sotboyak	42.83	726	
13.09.04.2005	Mongan Poula	30.61	1,111	
13.09.04.2006	Muara Sikabaluan	43.41	2,647	
13.09.04.2007	Sirilogui	107.24	1,384	
13.09.04.2008	Malancan	295.55	2,244	Situated in the north of the district.
13.09.04	Totals Siberut Utara District	782.68	9,325	
13.09.05.2001	Simatalu Sipokak	309.47	3,775	
13.09.05.2002	Simalegi	559.19	2,462	
13.09.05.2003	Sigapokna	294.98	2,287	Situated on the north coast of the island.
13.09.05	Totals Siberut Barat District	1,163.64	8,524	

== Transport ==
Inter-island ferries connect all the main islands, primarily calling at the Pokhai wharf near Muara Sigep in the north of Siberut island, and at the Maileppet wharf in Muara Siberut (in the south of Siberut), at Tua Pejat and Siuban (on Sipora island), Pasar Puat and Sikakap (on North Pagai island), and Simakalo (on South Pagai island). All these ports are also connected by ferry services, including the Mentawai fast (operating every Tuesday, Thursday, and Saturday to Siberut) and ASDP vessels, which provide weekly services and occasional inter-island transit with the provincial capital of Padang. Plus, Rokot Airport on Sipora island provides air services to West Sumatra.

Land connectivity on Siberut remain limited to specific routes. In the north of Siberut, a road connects the Pokhai wharf with Sikabaluan. In the south, a concrete road links Muntei, Muara Siberut, and the Maileppet wharf. Access to the interior villages, such as Madobag and Matotonan, is available via unpaved roads, though the west coast of Siberut is relatively poorly served by roads; inter-island services remain a vital transport alternative for most of the archipelago.

== Tourism ==
=== Surfing ===
Macaronis was first discovered in 1980 by pioneer surf discoverers Chris Goodnow, Scott Wakefield, and Tony Fitzpatrick, who originally named the break ‘P-Land’ on their first visit (after Pasangan Bay / Pagai Islands). Amazingly, and considering the remote location, P-Land may have been the first wave surfed in the Mentawai Islands. Lances Right was discovered a full 10 years later, while Chris, Scott, and Tony continued to keep their discovery a secret. They returned in 1981 with friend Tim Annand, and again on a boat trip in the 90's.

The first photos of the surf breaks in the Mentawais area were leaked after a surf trip in 1992 aboard the MV Indies Trader, with professional surfers Ross Clarke-Jones, Tom Carroll, and Martin Potter. Ever since then, the Mentawai Islands have been well on the radar of surf travellers around the world. At the West of Sumatra, the Mentawai Islands have the most consistent surf breaks in Indonesia making it one of the preferred choices for serious surfers. The tropical waters surrounding the islands offer year-round waves up to 15 ft (4.6 m).

== Ecology ==
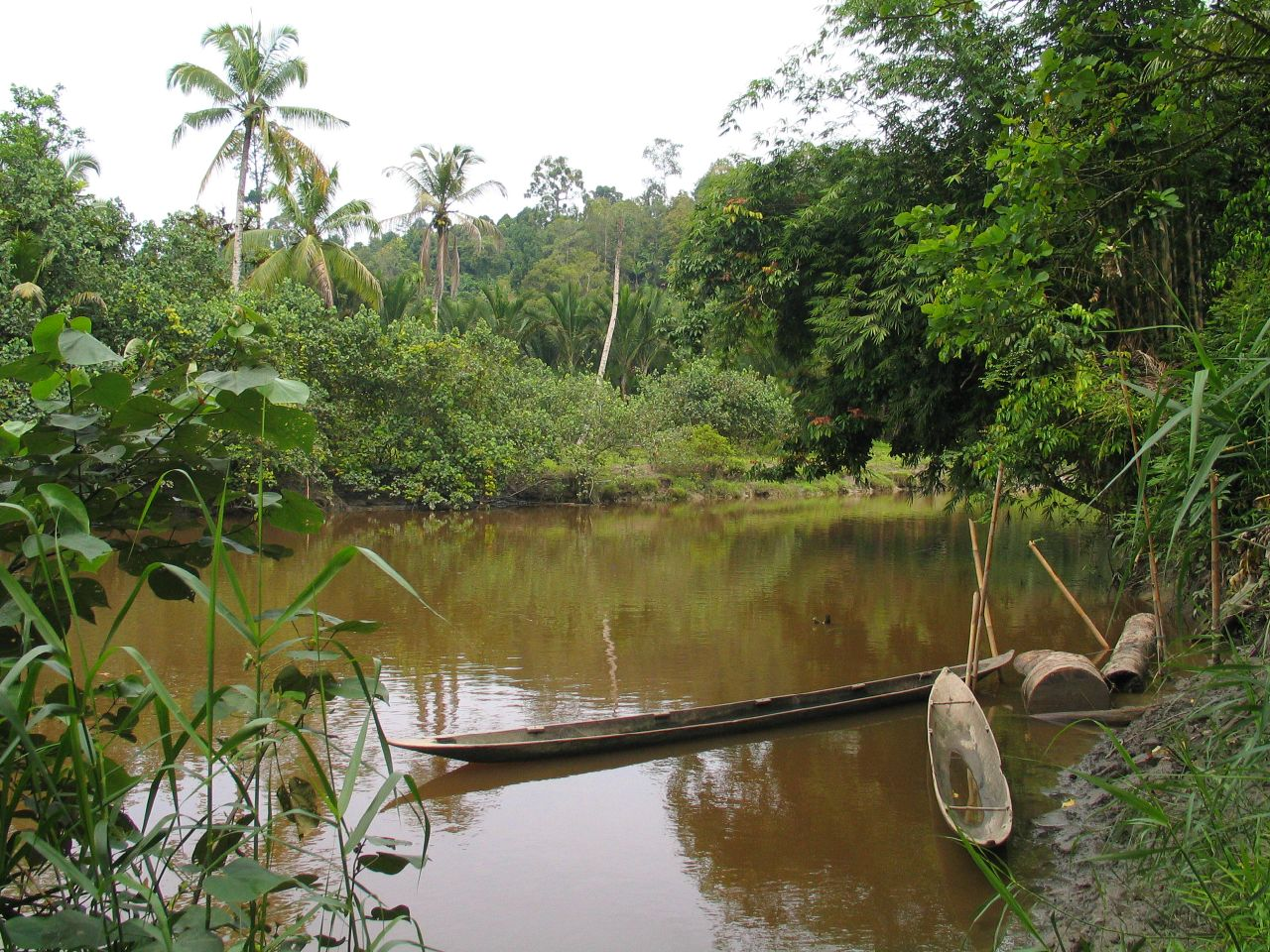
Dugout canoes on a river in Siberut

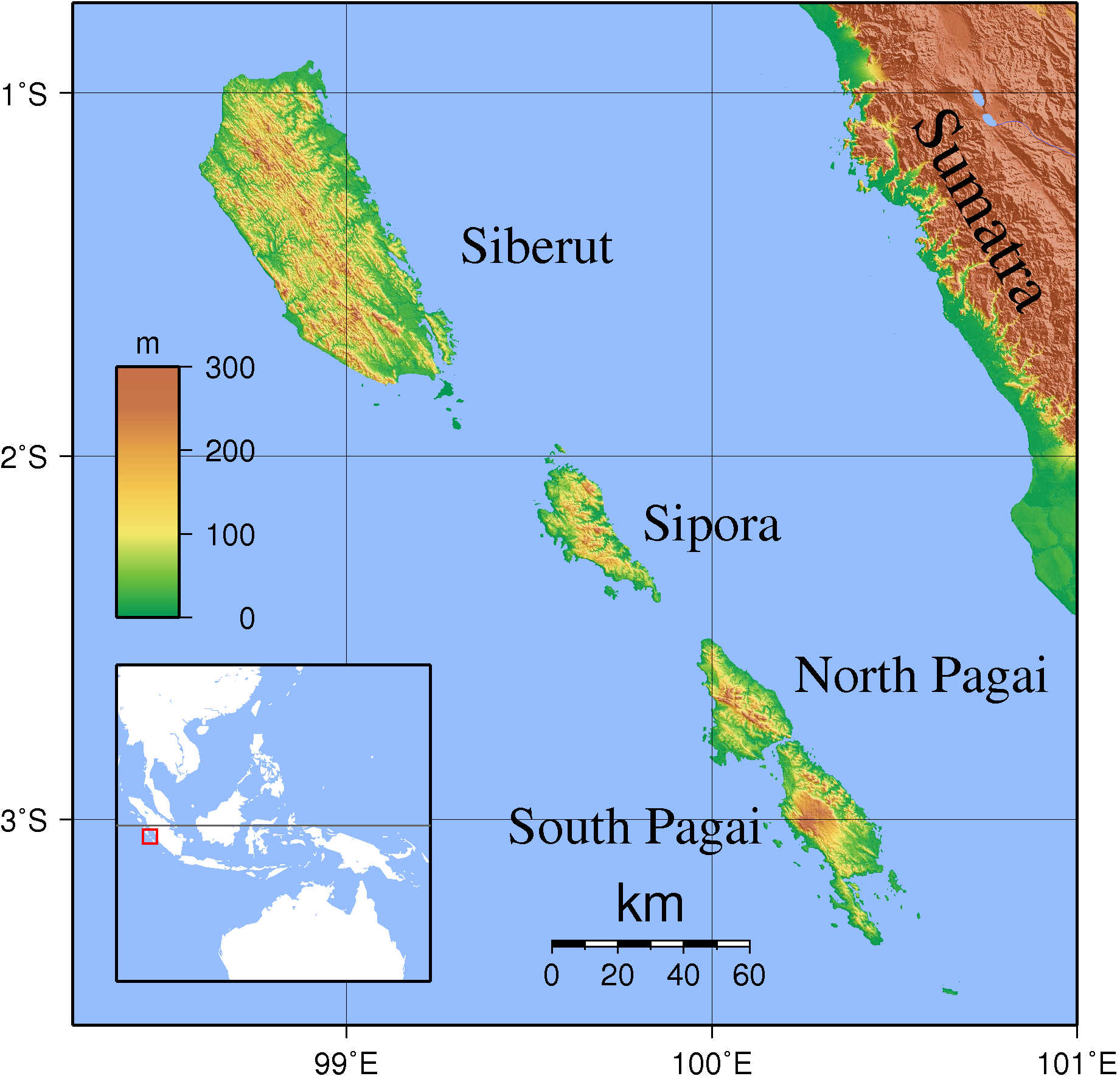
Mentawai Islands topography

The islands have been separated from Sumatra since the mid-Pleistocene period, which has allowed at least twenty endemic species to develop amongst its flora and fauna. This includes six endemic primates: the Kloss's gibbon (Hylobates klossii), Mentawai macaque (Macaca pagensis), Siberut macaque (Macaca siberu), Mentawai langur (Presbytis potenziani), Siberut langur (Presbytis siberu), and pig-tailed langur (Simias concolor). They are highly endangered due to logging, unsustainable hunting, and conversion of rainforest to palm oil plantations. Some areas of the Mentawai Islands rainforest ecoregion are protected, such as the Siberut National Park. Red junglefowl, the Asian palm civet, and crab-eating macaque are also native.

== Seismic activity ==
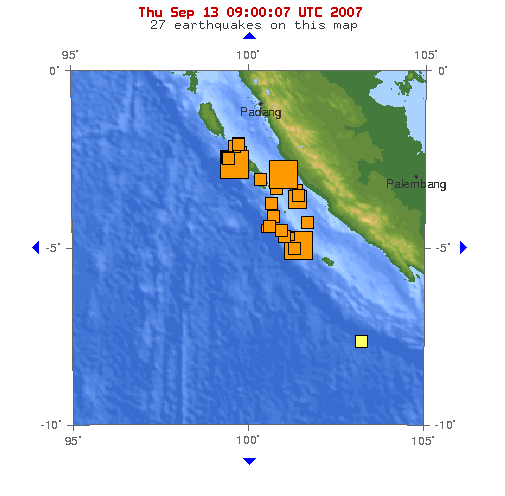
September 2007 Sumatra earthquakes

The Mentawai Islands lie above the Sunda megathrust, a seismically active zone responsible for many great earthquakes. This megathrust runs along the southwestern side of Sumatra island, forming the interface between the Eurasian Plate and the Indo-Australian Plate.

Earthquake and tsunami activity has been high since the 2004 Indian Ocean earthquake. In 1833, the region was hit with an earthquake, possibly similar in size to the 2004 Indian Ocean earthquake; another large earthquake struck in 1797. On October 25, 2010, an earthquake in southern Sumatra led to a deadly tsunami that devastated villages in South and North Pagai. On March 3, 2016, an earthquake of 7.8 magnitudes occurred off the Indian Ocean, a few hundred kilometres from Mentawai islands, as a result of strike-slip faulting within the oceanic lithosphere of the Indo-Australia plate.

== See also ==
- Mentawai ethnic group
- Mentawai Festival
