= Baháʼí Faith in Indonesia =

According to the Association of Religion Data Archives in 2015, accurate figures for the number of adherents to the Baháʼí Faith in Indonesia are not available. Baháʼís in Indonesia are subject to a measure of government discrimination.

== History ==
The Baháʼí Faith's presence in Indonesia can be traced to the late 19th century, when two Baháʼís visited what is now Indonesia, as well as several other Southeast Asian countries. The Mentawai Islands were one of the first areas outside the Middle East and the Western world where significant numbers of conversions to the religion took place, beginning in 1957. In 2014, the Baháʼí International Community (BIC) established a regional office in Jakarta.

== Legal status and discrimination ==
The activities of the Baháʼí Faith were banned in Indonesia in 1962 based on Presidential Decree No. 264 of 1962 by President Sukarno. The Decree was then revoked in 2000 by Presidential Decree No. 69 of 2000 by President Abdurrahman Wahid.

Nevertheless, the Indonesian Baháʼí community continues to face discrimination. Social acceptance appears to have been greater during the Dutch colonial period than in the New Order period and the subsequent Reform period. In 2002, the Indonesian Ulema Council issued a fatwa declaring it forbidden for Baháʼís to be buried in public places. A 2011 research paper reported various forms of discrimination against the small Baháʼí community in the town of Canga'an, Banyuwangi, East Java. Furthermore, the USCIRF stated in a 2016 report:

Indonesia's Baha'i community still experiences government discrimination because of their faith. Despite Religious Affairs Minister Lukman's 2014 statement that the Baha'i faith should be recognized as a religion protected by the constitution, the government has not changed official policy. Baha'i followers are not able to obtain state recognition of civil marriages, have limited educational opportunities, and must state a faith other than their own on their ID cards. Only recently have some Baha'is been allowed to leave blank the religion field on their ID cards. Although some schools now allow Baha'is to provide their own religious education, Baha'i instruction is not part of the official curriculum on religion set by the national standards board, and some Baha'i students instead are forced to study Protestantism or Catholicism.

== Statistics ==
The religion had approximately 22,800 adherents in Indonesia in 2010, according to an estimate by the Association of Religion Data Archives (ARDA) based on data from the World Christian Encyclopedia. In its 2015 profile of the country, the ARDA noted that while the Indonesian Baháʼí community claimed a membership in the thousands, no reliable figures were available.

== See also ==
- Baháʼí Faith in Asia
- Religion in Indonesia
- Religious freedom in Indonesia
- Persecution of Baháʼís
