= Religion in Indonesia =

Religion in Indonesia (2025)
1. Islam (87.2%)
2. Protestantism (7.37%)
3. Catholicism (3.07%)
4. Hinduism (1.66%)
5. Buddhism (0.69%)
6. Confucianism, and indigenous beliefs (0.06%)

Religious distribution in each districts of Indonesia (2022)

Several different religions are practised in Indonesia, without an established state religion. The first principle of Indonesia's philosophical foundation, Pancasila, requires its citizens to state the belief in "the one and almighty God", sometimes called a "public religion". Although, as explained by the Constitutional Court, this first sila of Pancasila is an explicit recognition of divine substances (i.e. divine providence) and meant as a principle on how to live together in a religiously diverse society. Blasphemy is a punishable offence (since 1965, see § History) and the Indonesian government has a discriminatory attitude towards its numerous tribal religions, atheist and agnostic citizens. In addition, the Aceh province officially applies Sharia and implements different practices towards religious minorities.

Several different religions are practised in the country, and their collective influence on the country's political, economic and cultural life is significant. Despite constitutionally guaranteeing freedom of religion, in 1965, the government recognized only six religions: Islam, Christianity (Catholicism, under the label of "Katolik", and Protestantism, under the label of "Kristen", are recognised separately), Hinduism, Buddhism and Confucianism. In that same year, the government specified that it will not ban other religions, specifically mentioning Judaism, Zoroastrianism, Shinto, and Taoism as examples. According to a 2017 decision of the Constitutional Court of Indonesia, "the branches/flows of beliefs" (Indonesian: aliran kepercayaan)—ethnic religions with new religious movements—must be recognised and included in an Indonesian identity card (KTP). Based on data collected by the Indonesian Conference on Religion and Peace (ICRP), there are about 245 unofficial religions in Indonesia.

From 1965 to 2017, Indonesian law mandated that its citizens possess an identity card indicating their religious affiliation, which could be chosen from a selection of those six recognised religions. However, since 2017, citizens who do not identify with those religions have the option to leave that section blank on their identity card. Although there is no apostasy law preventing Indonesians from converting to any religion, Indonesia does not recognise agnosticism or atheism, and blasphemy is considered illegal. According to Ministry of Home Affairs data in 2025, 87.15% of Indonesians identified themselves as Muslim (with Sunnis about 99%, Shias about 1%), 10.44% Christians (7.37% Protestants, 3.07% Roman Catholic), 1.66% Hindu, 0.75% Buddhists, Confucians, and indigenous beliefs.

== History ==
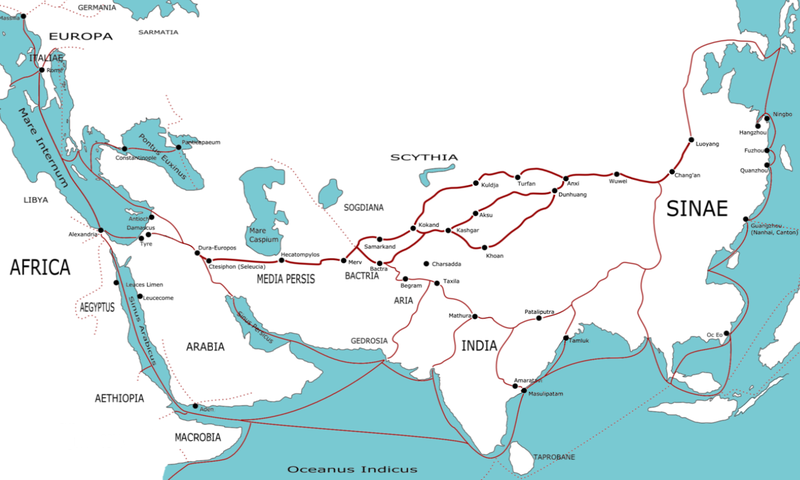
The Maritime Silk Road, connecting India and Indonesia

Until the beginning of CE, the peoples of Indonesia followed the local tribal Austronesian and Papuan ethnic religions and traditions.

Historically, immigration from the Indian subcontinent, mainland China, Portugal, the Arab world, and the Netherlands has been a significant contributor to the diversity of religion and culture within the archipelago. However, these aspects have changed due to some modifications made to suit the Indonesian culture.

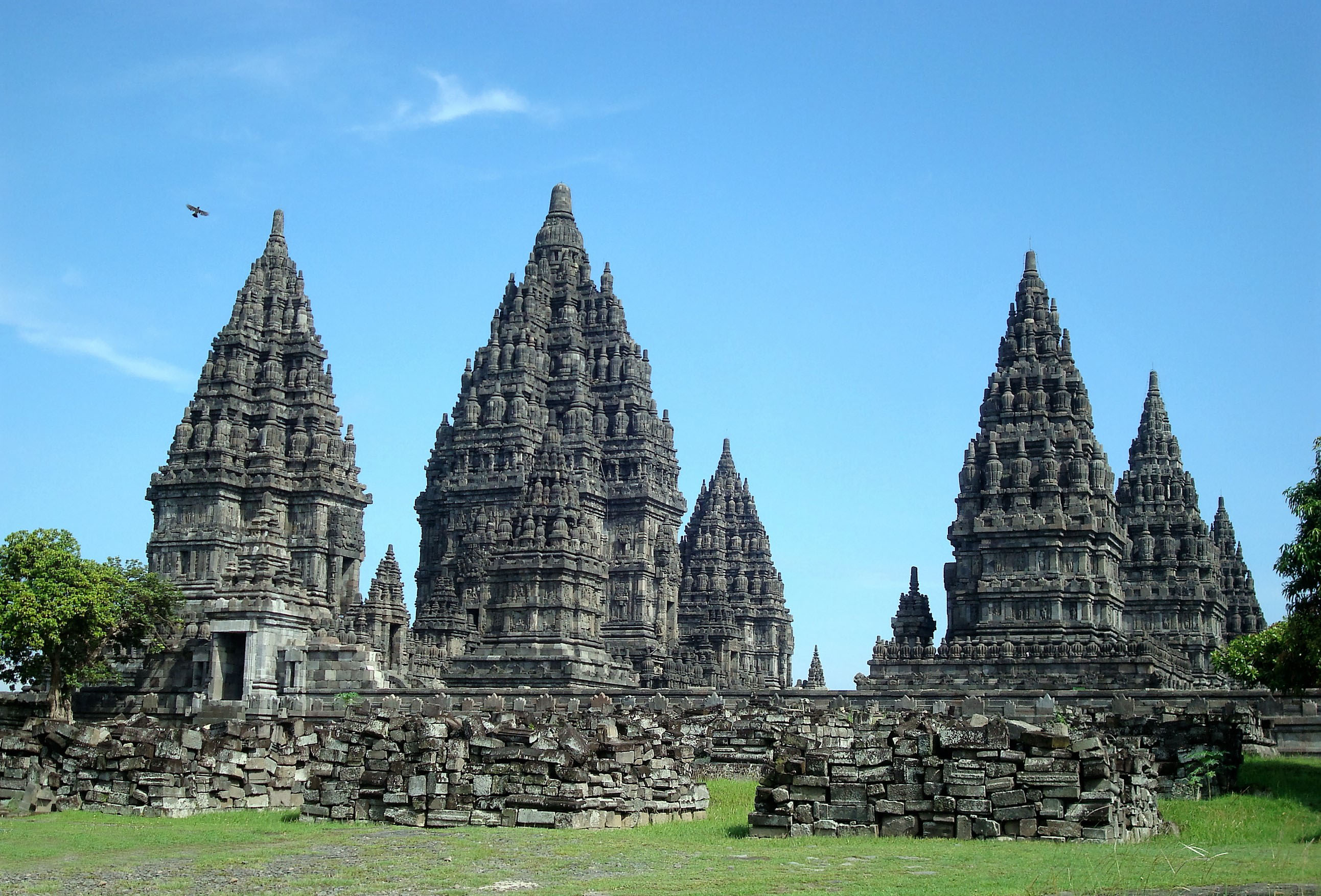
The ancient Prambanan Hindu temple built in the 9th century, Java

Before the arrival of the Abrahamic religions of Islam, Christianity and Judaism, the prevalent religions in the region were the Indian religions of Hinduism and Buddhism. They were brought to the archipelago around the second and fourth centuries, respectively, when Indian traders arrived on the islands of Sumatra, Java and Sulawesi, and brought their religion. The Shaivite sect of Hinduism started to develop in Java in the fifth century CE. Hinduism had a decisive influence on the ideology of the one-man rule of the Raja, and was the dominant religion in Indonesia before the arrival of Islam. The traders also established Buddhism which developed further in the following century and several Hindu and Buddhist-influenced kingdoms were established, such as Kutai, Srivijaya, Majapahit, and Shailendra. The world's largest Buddhist monument, Borobudur, was built by Shailendra and around the same time, the Hindu monument Prambanan was also built. The peak of Hindu-Javanese civilisation was the Majapahit empire in the fourteenth century, and is described as a 'Golden Age' in Indonesian history.

Islam was introduced to the archipelago in the twelfth or thirteenth century. Coming from Gujarat, India (some scholars also propose the Arabian and Persian theories), Islam spread through the north and west coast of Sumatra (where, in 1111, first local Acehnese people were converted by an Arab called 'Abd-Allah 'Arif) and then developed to the east in Java. This period also saw Islam-influenced kingdoms established, namely Demak, Pajang, Mataram and Banten. By the end of the fifteenth century, 20 Islam-based kingdoms had been established, reflecting the domination of Islam in Indonesia.

The Portuguese introduced Christianity in the 16th century, notably to the island of Flores and to what was to become East Timor. Protestantism was first introduced by the Dutch in the 16th century with Calvinist and Lutheran influences. For the Dutch, economic benefit rather than religious conversion were paramount, and missionary efforts avoided predominantly Muslim areas such as Java. The Dutch East India Company (VOC) regulated the missionary work so it could serve its own interests and focused it to the eastern, Animist part of the archipelago, including Maluku, North Sulawesi, Nusa Tenggara, Papua and Kalimantan. Christianity later spread from the coastal ports of Kalimantan, and missionaries arrived among the Torajans on Sulawesi. Parts of Sumatra were also targeted, most notably the Batak people who are predominantly Protestant today.

The Sukarno era was characterised by a "distrust" between religion and the state; an example of this was the passing of a presidential edict in late January 1965 (still completely in force today and will be partially repealed starting 2026) which alongside attempting to ban religious blasphemy also explicitly declared in its explanatory memorandum that:

The religions professed by citizens in Indonesia are: Islam, Christianity [Catholicism and Protestantism], Hinduism, Buddhism, and Kong Fuzi (Confucianism).

This can be proved in the history of development of Religions in Indonesia. Because these 6 religions are the religions that are professed by almost all Indonesian citizens, thus unless they received guarantees as stated in article 29 clause 2 of the Constitution, they also receive aid and security [...]

This does not mean other religions, such as: Jew [Judaism], Zarasustrian, Shinto, Taoism are banned in Indonesia. They are given full guarantee as granted by article 29 clause 2 [of the Constitution] and they are free to develop, as long as they don't violate the terms of this regulation and other regulations.

For spiritual bodies/streams, the Government attempts to direct them to a healthy viewpoint and to the direction of the Belief of the One and Only God. This is as stated by the Resolutions of the Provisional People's Consultative Assembly Number II/MPRS/1960 [on the Broad Outlines of the First Stage National Overall Planned Development Plan 1961–1969], appendix A, segment I, number 6.

There were also significant changes to the relationship during the New Order. Following an attempted coup in 1965 that officially blamed the Communist Party of Indonesia (PKI) and an anti-communist mass killings, the New Order government attempted to suppress PKI supporters by making it mandatory to have a religion since PKI supporters were mostly abangan (agnostic Muslims). As a result, citizens were required to carry personal identification cards indicating their religion. The policy resulted in a mass conversion, with most to Catholicism and Protestantism. Chinese Indonesians, who were mostly Confucianists, also faced similar circumstances. Because Confucianism was not one of the state-recognised religions, many converted to Christianity.

== Islam ==
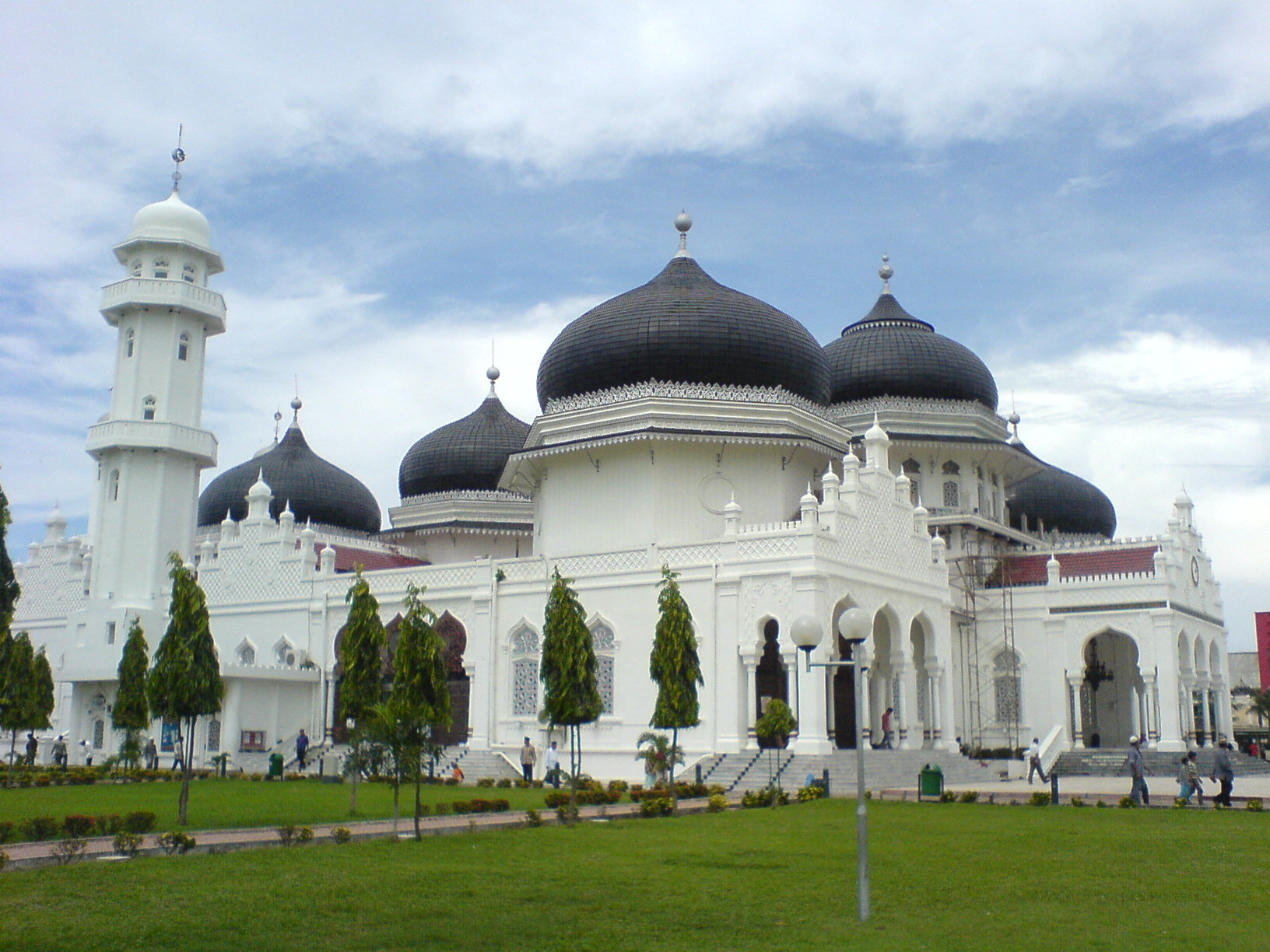
Baiturrahman Grand Mosque in Banda Aceh, Aceh

Muslim in each districts of Indonesia (2022)

The history of Islam in Indonesia is complex and reflects the diversity of Indonesian cultures. There is evidence of Arab Muslim traders entering the Indonesian archipelago as early as the 8th century. Venetian explorer Marco Polo is credited with the earliest known record of a Muslim community around 1297 AD, whom he referred to as a new community of Moorish traders in Perlak, Aceh. Over the 15th and 16th century, the spread of Islam accelerated via the missionary work of Maulana Malik Ibrahim (also known as Sunan Gresik, originally from Samarkand, at the time part of the Persian empire) in Sumatra and Java and Admiral Zheng He (also known as Cheng Ho, from China) in north Java, as well as campaigns led by sultans that targeted Hindu-Buddhist kingdoms and various communities, with each trying to carve out a region or island for control. Four diverse and contentious sultanates emerged in northern and southern Sumatra, west and central Java, and southern Kalimantan. The sultans declared Islam as a state religion and pursued war against each other, including on non-Muslim communities.

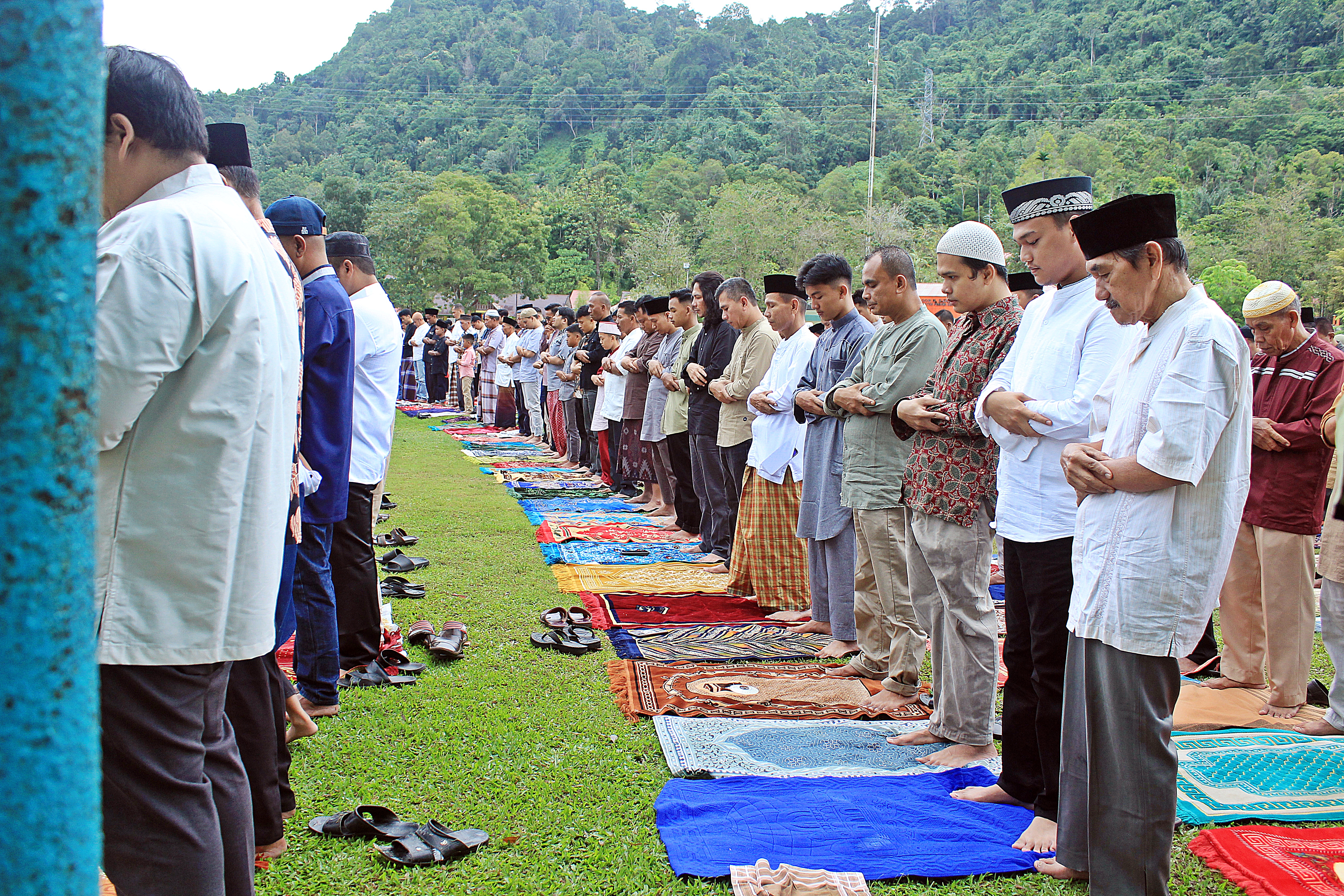
Indonesian Muslim men wearing kupiah, songkok, and sarong standing in salah

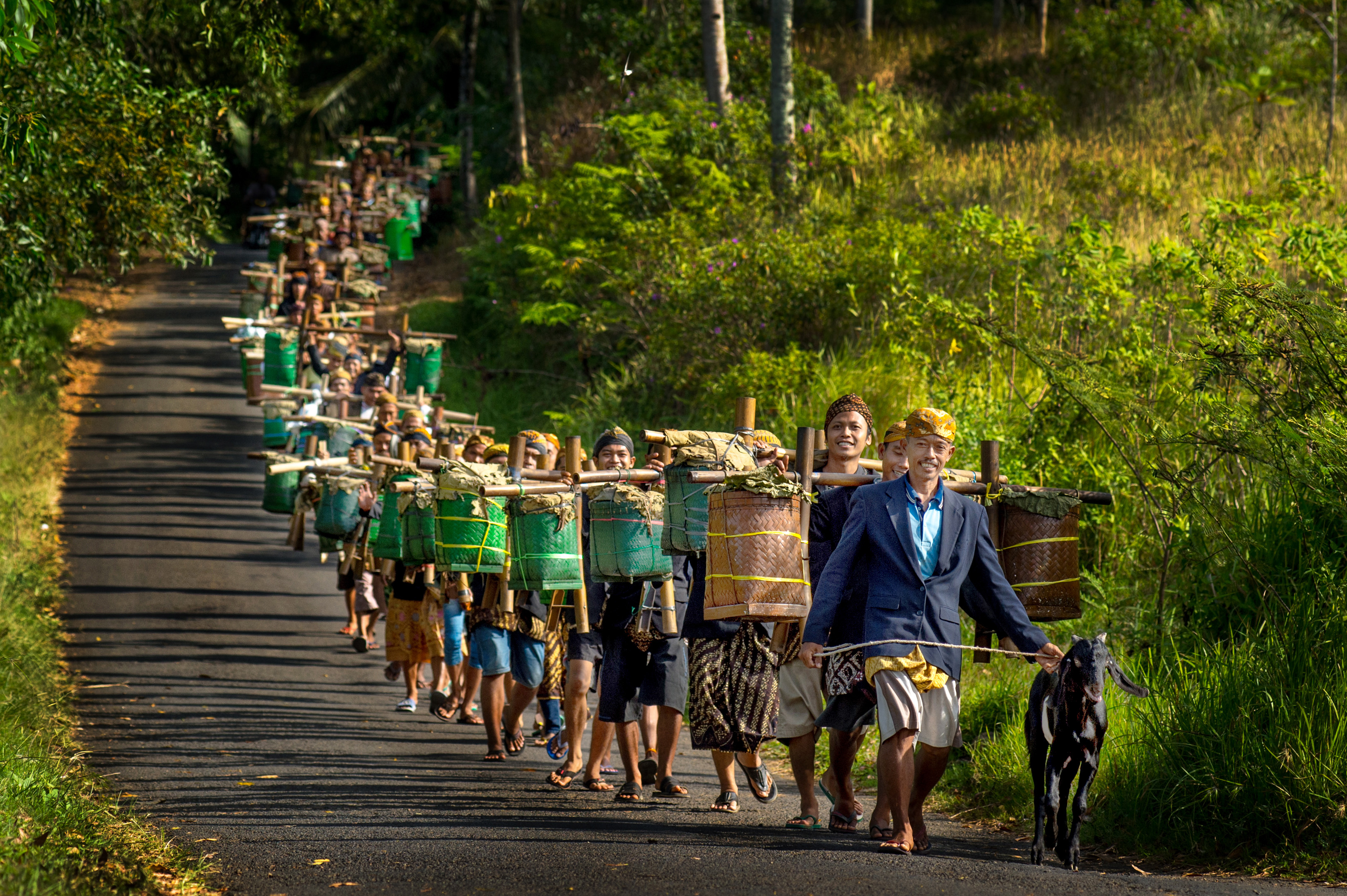
Perlon Unggahan—a slametan ritual for ancestors of Javanese Muslims in Pekuncen, Banyumas on last Friday before Ramadan

Subsequently, Hindu, Buddhist, Confucian, animist communities and unbelievers bought peace by agreeing to pay jizya tax to a Muslim ruler, while others began adopting Islam to escape the tax. Islam in Indonesia is in many cases less meticulously practised in comparison to Islam in the Middle East. In some regions, people retained and continued their old beliefs. They adopted a syncretic version of Islam, while others left and concentrated as communities in islands that they could defend, for example, Hindus of Java moved to Bali and neighbouring small islands. While this period of religious conflict and inter-Sultanate warfare was unfolding, and new power centres were attempting to consolidate regions under their control, European powers arrived. The archipelago was soon dominated by the Dutch empire, which helped prevent inter-religious conflict, and slowly began the process of excavating, preserving and understanding the archipelago's ancient Hindu and Buddhist period, particularly in Java and the western islands.

=== Sunni ===
The vast majority of Indonesian Muslims (c. 99%) practice Sunni Islam of the Shafi‘i school. Smaller numbers follow other schools (madhhabs), and the Salafi movement. The main divisions of Islam in Indonesia are traditionalism and modernism. Both are supported by Indonesia's two largest Islamic civil society groups Nahdlatul Ulama and Muhammadiyah, respectively. Many Indonesian mosques asserted their particular attachment to these two organizations. The orders of Sufism are considered essential.

Concerning the political expansion of Islam after the resignation of Suharto, political parties were again permitted to declare an ideology other than Pancasila. Several Islamist parties formed with Sharia as their ideology and the Crescent Star Party (PBB) came in sixth place in the 1999 elections. However, in the 2009 elections, the PBB ranked only tenth, while parties characterized by more moderate and tolerant interpretations of Islam achieved greater electoral success; the Prosperous Justice Party (PKS), for example, placed fourth with nearly 8% of the vote

=== Shia ===
Shia Islam played an important role in the early period of the spread of Islam in North Sumatra and Java. Currently, there are approximately 1–3 million Twelvers in Sumatra, Java, Madura and Sulawesi islands, and also Ismailis in Bali, which approximates more than 1% of the total Muslim population. Shias form a segment of Arab Indonesians and the Hadhrami people. The main organisation is "Ikatan Jamaah Ahlulbait Indonesia" (IJABI).

=== Ahmadiyya ===
The earliest history of Ahmadi Muslims in the archipelago dates back to the summer of 1925, when roughly two decades before the Indonesian revolution, a missionary of the Community, Rahmat Ali, stepped in Sumatra and established the movement with 13 devotees in Tapaktuan, Aceh. The community has had an influential history in Indonesia's religious development, yet in modern times it has faced increasing intolerance from religious establishments and physical hostilities from radical Muslim groups. In Ahmadiyya organisation Jamaah Muslim Ahmadiyah Indonesia (JMAI), there are an estimated 400.000 followers, which equates to 0.2% of the total Muslim population, spread over 542 branches across the country; in contrast to independent estimates, the Ministry of Religious Affairs estimates around 80.000 members. A separatist group, Lahore Ahmadiyya Movement for the Propagation of Islam, known as Gerakan Ahmadiyah-Lahore Indonesia (GAI) in Indonesia, has existed in Java since 1924 and had only 708 members in the 1980s.

== Religious minorities ==
=== Christianity ===
Christians in each districts of Indonesia (2022)

The government officially recognises the two main Christian divisions in Indonesia, Catholicism and Protestantism, as two separate religions.

==== Protestantism ====
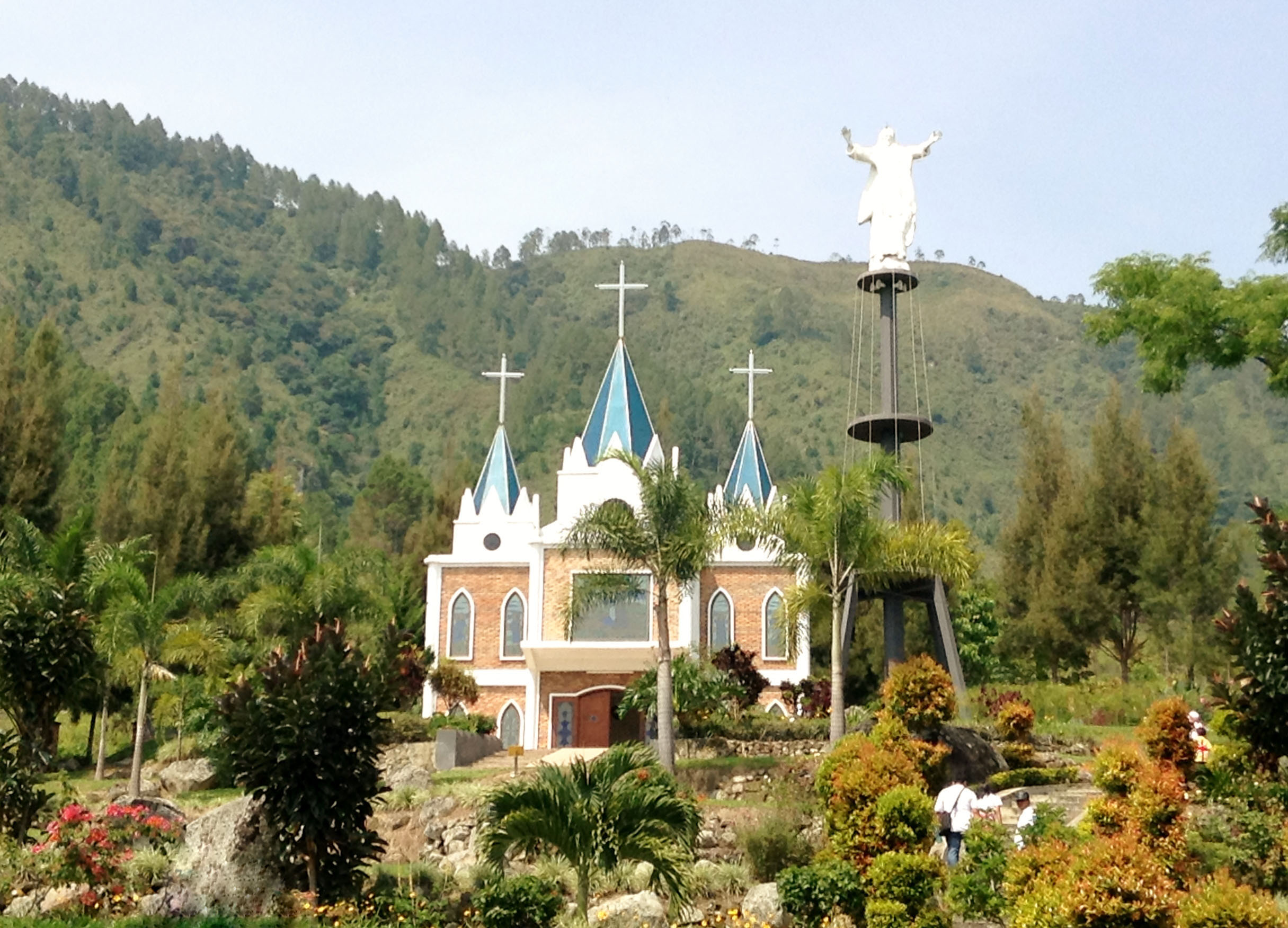
Church in Bukit Doa Getsemane Sanggam, Unjur, Samosir, North Sumatra

Protestantism is mostly a result of Calvinist and Lutheran missionary efforts during the country's colonial period. The Dutch Reformed Church was long at the forefront in introducing Christianity to native peoples and was later joined by other Reformed churches that separated from it during the 19th century. The VOC regulated the missionary work so it could serve its own interests and restricted it to the eastern part of the Indonesian archipelago. Although these two branches are the most common, a multitude of other denominations can be found elsewhere in Indonesia.

Protestants form a significant minority in some parts of the country. Statistically, 7.6% of the total population declared themselves Protestant in a 2018 census. Seventeen per cent of the population in Sulawesi are Protestants, particularly in Tana Toraja regency in South Sulawesi province and Central Sulawesi. Furthermore, up to 65% of the ethnic Torajans are Protestants. The Batak people from North Sumatra is also one of the major Protestant groups in Indonesia, comprising around 50% out of all ethnic population. Christianity was brought by German Lutheran missionary Ludwig Ingwer Nommensen who is known as the apostle to the Batak people and started the Batak Christian Protestant Church (HKBP), which is the largest Lutheran church in Asia.

Anglicanism is present in Indonesia since 1819, during the British Invasion of Java, when church services were provided towards interdenominational English speaking communities in Java. In 1822, Singaporean-based London Missionary Society purchased a land in Batavia (now Jakarta) and in 1829 constructed of what is now known as All Saints Church. The organization become affiliated with Church of England and is an autonomous part of Anglican Communion since 1857 and is oldest English-speaking institutions in Indonesia. In 1993, Anglican Diocese of Singapore established "Deanery of Indonesia". In 1998, Gereja Anglikan Indonesia (lit. 'Anglican Church of Indonesia') was founded to provide better services to native Indonesians. As of 2022, the congregation is present in Jakarta, Bandung, Surabaya, Batam, Medan, Nunukan, Pontianak, Ambon, and Tarakan.

Chinese Indonesians are also a significant part of the Protestant population, scattered throughout Indonesia with the majority concentrated in major urban areas. In 2000, approximately 35% of ethnic Chinese were Christian, and there is a continuous increase among the younger generation. In some parts of the country, entire villages belong to a distinct denomination, such as Adventism, the International Church of the Foursquare Gospel, Lutheran, Presbyterian or the Salvation Army (Bala Keselamatan) depending on the success of missionary activity.

Indonesia has six Protestant-majority provinces, Southwest Papua, West Papua, Central Papua, Papua, Highland Papua and North Sulawesi, with 61.84%, 68.75%, 87.89%, 70.44%, 98%, and 67.33% of the total population respectively. In the Papua region, it is most widely practised among the native Papuan population. In North Sulawesi, the Minahasan population centred around Manado converted to Christianity in the 19th century. Today, most of the population native to North Sulawesi practice some form of Protestantism, while transmigrants from Java and Madura practice Islam. Adherents of Protestantism mostly live in North Sumatra, West Kalimantan, Central Kalimantan, South Sulawesi, West Sulawesi, Central Sulawesi, North Sulawesi, East Nusa Tenggara, North Maluku, Maluku (province), Southwest Papua, West Papua (province), Central Papua, Highland Papua, and Papua.

The Communion of Churches in Indonesia is the sole umbrella for most Protestant churches.

==== Catholicism ====
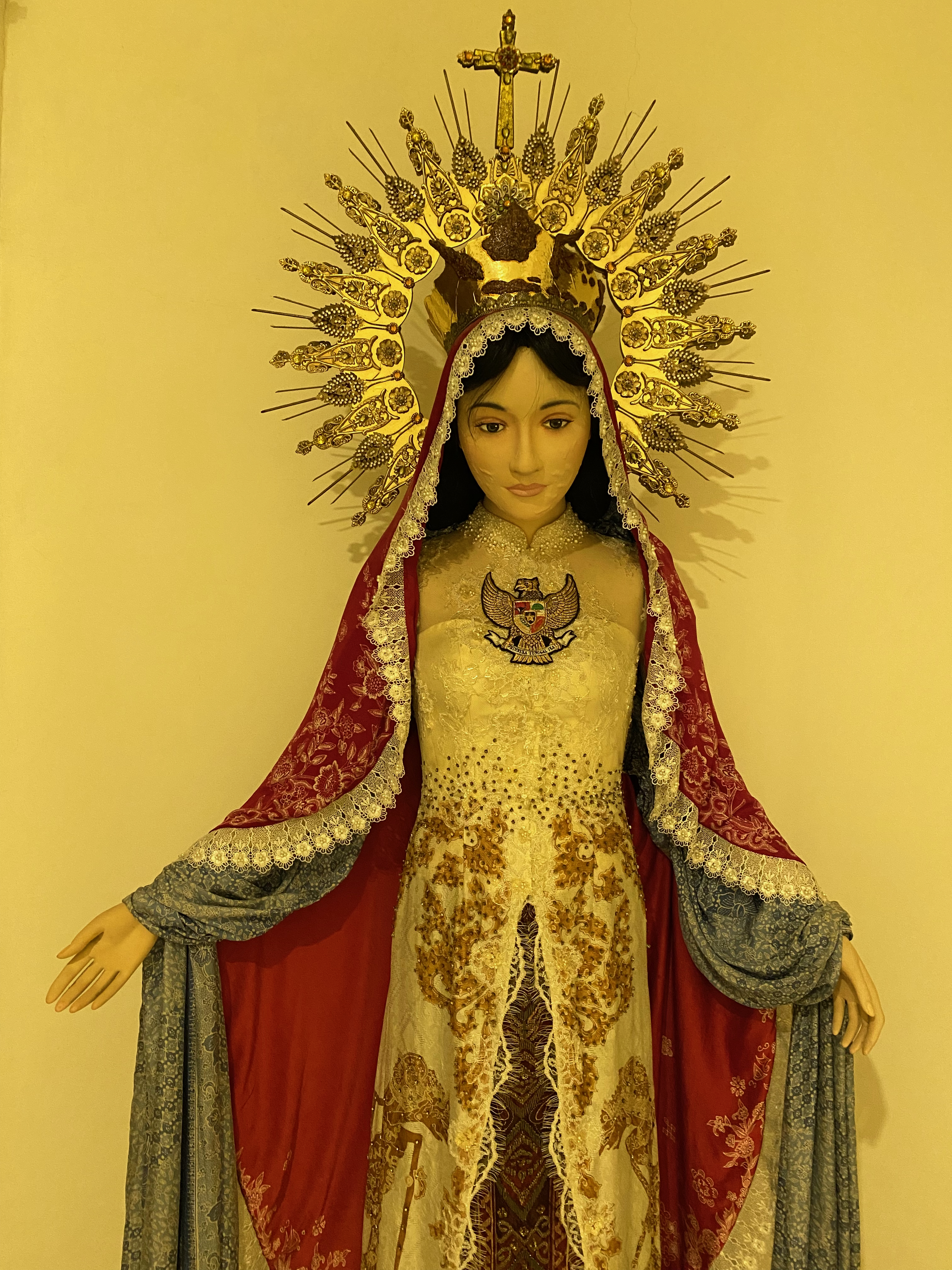
Statue of Mary, Mother of All Tribes in Jakarta Cathedral

Catholicism arrived in the archipelago during the Portuguese arrival with spice-trading over the 14th and 15th century. Many Portuguese had the goal of spreading Catholicism, starting with the Maluku Islands in 1534. Between 1546 and 1547, the pioneer Christian missionary, Saint Francis Xavier, visited the islands and baptised several thousand locals. During the VOC era, the number of Catholics fell significantly, due to the VOC's policy of banning the religion. The hostility of the Dutch toward Catholicism is due to its history where the Protestant Dutch gained their independence after the Eighty Years War against Catholic Spain's rule. The most significant result was on the island of Flores and East Timor where the VOC concentrated. Moreover, Catholic priests were sent to prisons or punished and replaced by Protestant clergy from the Netherlands. One Catholic priest was executed for celebrating Mass in prison during Jan Pieterszoon Coen's tenure as Governors of the Dutch East Indies. After the VOC collapsed and with the legalisation of Catholicism in the Netherlands starting around 1800, Dutch Catholic clergy predominated until after Indonesia's independence. In present-day Flores, the royal house of Larantuka formed the only native Catholic kingdom in Southeast Asia around the 16th century, with the first king named Lorenzo.

Other than Flores, Central Java also has significant numbers of Catholics. Catholicism started to spread in Central Java when Frans van Lith, a priest from the Netherlands came to Muntilan in 1896. Initially, his effort did not produce a satisfying result until 1904 when four Javanese chiefs from Kalibawang region asked him to give them education in the religion. On 15 December 1904, a group of 178 Javanese were baptised at Semagung, Muntilan, district Magelang, Central Java, near the border of the Special Region of Yogyakarta.

As of 2022, 3.06% of Indonesians are Catholics, nearly half the number of Protestants at 7.43%. The practitioners mostly live in West Kalimantan, Papua (specifically South Papua) and East Nusa Tenggara. The province of East Nusa Tenggara, where the island of Flores and West Timor are located, and South Papua are the two provinces in Indonesia where Catholics are the largest religious group (respectively, about 54.14% and 49.93% of the total population). However, Catholics may be found in smaller numbers spread throughout the country. In Java, next to Javanese, Catholicism also spread to Chinese Indonesians. In the present day, Catholic traditions close to Easter days remain, locally known as Semana Santa. It involves a procession carrying statues of Jesus and the Virgin Mary (locally referred to as Tuan Ana and Tuan Ma respectively) to a local beach, then to Cathedral of the Queen of the Rosary, the Diocese of Larantuka, Flores.

In September 2024, Pope Francis visited Indonesia, as part of an apostolic journey also including Papua New Guinea, East Timor, and Singapore. This marked the third visit by a pope to Indonesia, after Pope Paul VI in 1970 and Pope John Paul II in 1989.

==== Orthodoxy ====
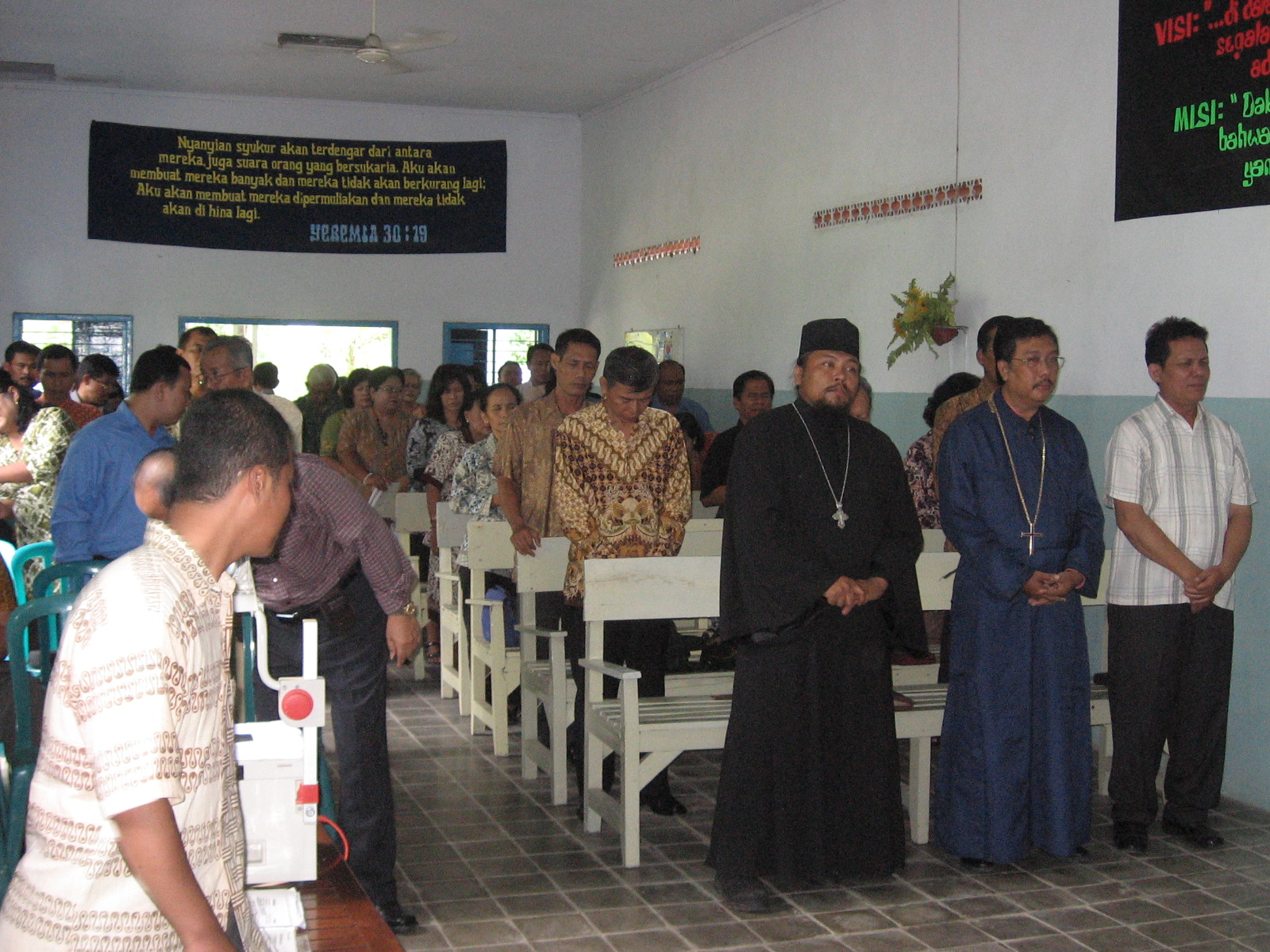
Indonesian Orthodox worshipers in Surabaya, 2011

Eastern Christianity operates in Indonesia under the label "Kristen" together with Protestants.

Eastern Orthodoxy is represented by the Indonesian Orthodox Church (Moscow Patriarchate), which until 2019 was part of the Russian Orthodox Diocese of Sydney, Australia and New Zealand (Russian Orthodox Church Outside Russia), and then comes under the unified spiritual leadership of the Diocese of Singapore (Russian Orthodox Church).

In addition, there are communities of Oriental Orthodoxy, namely the Syriac Orthodox Church (Indonesian: Kanisah Ortodoks Suriah) and Coptic Orthodox Church (Indonesian: Gereja Kristen Ortodoks Koptik di Indonesia). An Armenian Orthodox community historically existed in the country during the colonial era, but has mostly left following independence.

==== Other Christians ====
Other branches of Christianity also exist in Indonesia, such as Mormonism (since 1969) and Jehovah's Witnesses (since 1930). Previously banned in 1976 for to their refusal to salute the Indonesian flag and participate in politics, Jehovah's Witnesses were officially registered with the Ministry of Religious Affairs in March 2002. In November 2019, Russell M. Nelson, President of the Church of Jesus Christ of Latter-day Saints (LDS Church) visited the Vice Presidential Palace, where he officially met Ma'ruf Amin, the Vice President of Indonesia.

=== Hinduism ===
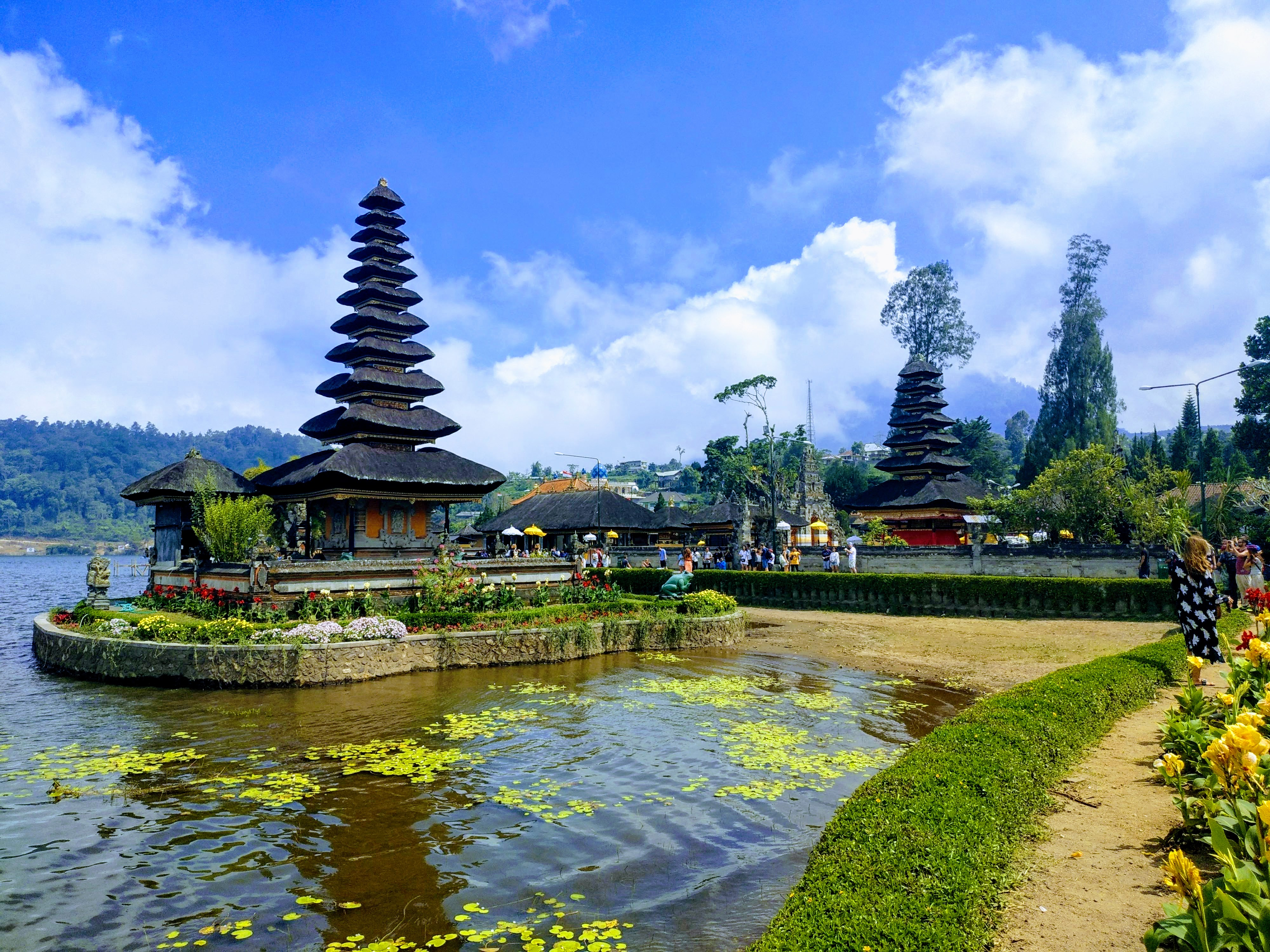
The Temple of Ulun Danu Bratan, in Bali, is the most important, the largest and holiest temple of the Balinese Hindus.

Hindus in each districts of Indonesia (2022)

Hindu culture and religion arrived in the archipelago around the 2nd century CE, which later formed the basis of several Hindu-Buddhist kingdoms such as Kutai, Mataram, and Majapahit. Around 130, a Sundanese kingdom named Salakanagara emerged in western Java. It was the first historically recorded Indianised kingdom in the archipelago, created by an Indian trader following marriage to a local Sundanese princess. The largest Hindu temple in Indonesia, Prambanan, was built during the Majapahit kingdom by the Sanjaya dynasty. The kingdom existed until the 16th century when Islamic empires began to develop, this period known as the Hindu-Indonesian period.

Hinduism in Indonesia takes on a distinct tone from other parts of the world. Hinduism, referred to as Agama Hindu Dharma in Indonesia, formally applied the caste system. It also incorporated native Austronesian elements that revered hyangs, deities and spirits of nature and deceased ancestors. The Hindu religious epics, the Mahabharata and the Ramayana, are expressed in Indonesian wayang puppetry and dance. All practitioners of Agama Hindu Dharma share many common beliefs, mostly the Five Points of Philosophy, the Panca Srada. These include the belief in one Almighty God (Brahman), belief in the souls and myriad of local and ancestral spirits and karma or the belief in the law of reciprocal actions, rather than belief in cycles of rebirth and reincarnation. In addition, the religion focuses more on art and ritual rather than scriptures, laws and beliefs. In many areas on Java, Hinduism and Islam have heavily influenced each other, in part resulting in Abangan and Kejawèn (Kebatinan) traditions.

According to the 2018 data, Hindus numbered 4.69 million (1.69% of Indonesians). The Parisada Hindu Dharma Indonesia has disputed this figure, who estimated as many as 18 million Hindus in the country. The majority of Hindus live in Bali. Sumatra, Java, Lombok, Kalimantan and Sulawesi also have significant Hindu populations; most are Balinese who migrated to these areas through government-sponsored transmigration program or urbanised Balinese attracted to cities in Java, especially the Greater Jakarta area. The Tamil Indonesians in Medan represents another important concentration of Hindus.

There are indigenous religions that are incorporated into the Hinduism (not all followers agree): Hindu Kaharingan of Dayak people; Javanese Hinduism of Tenggerese tribe; Hindu Tolotang of Bugis; and Aluk Todolo (Hindu Alukta) of Toraja.

There are also some international Hindu reform movements, including the International Society for Krishna Consciousness, Sathya Sai Organization, Chinmaya Mission, Brahma Kumaris, Ananda Marga, Sahaja Yoga, and Haidakhandi Samaj.

=== Buddhism ===
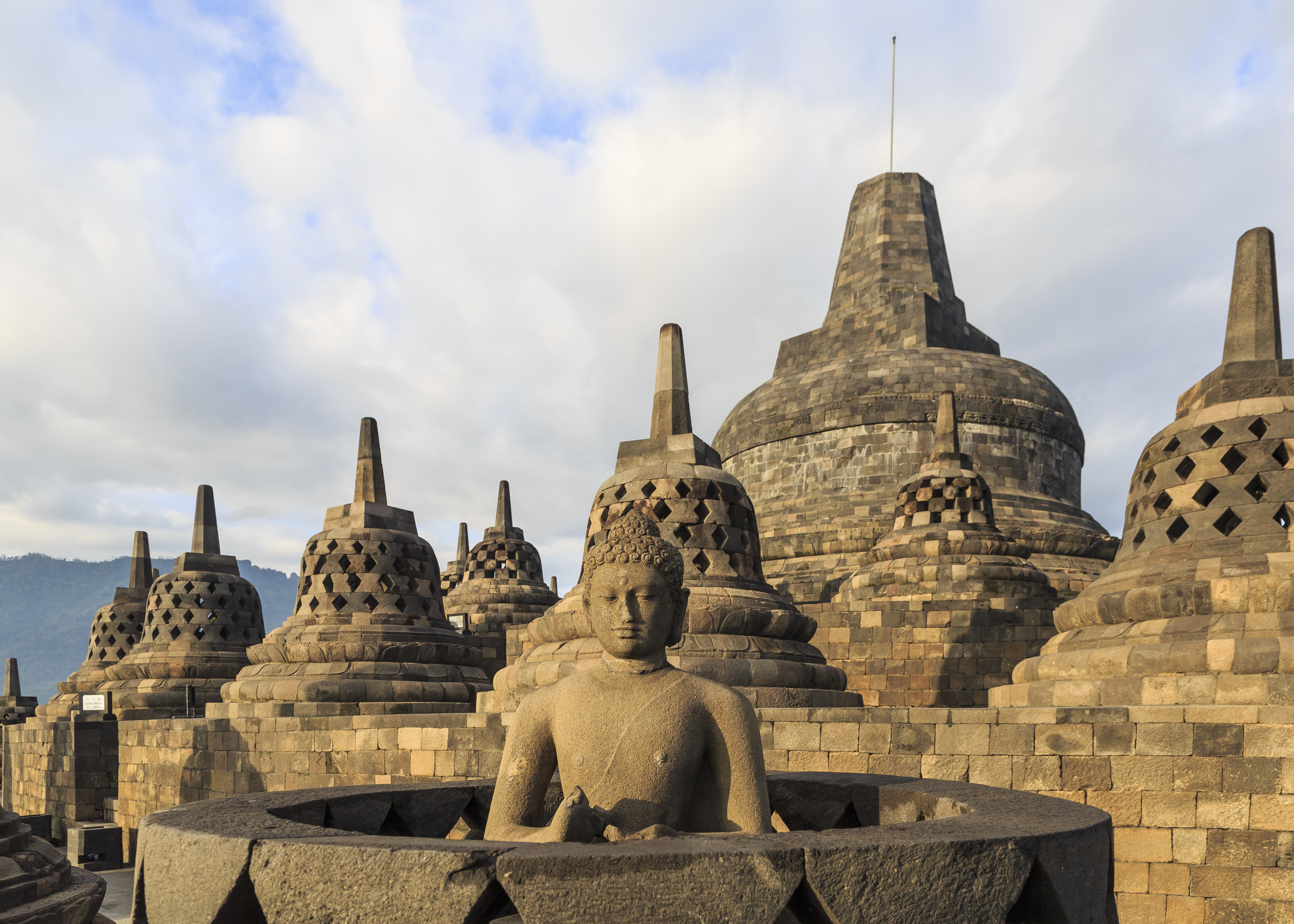
The Buddha statue at Borobudur temple, Magelang, Central Java

Buddhists in each districts of Indonesia (2022)

Buddhism is the second oldest religion in Indonesia, arriving around the sixth century. The history of Buddhism in Indonesia is closely related to that of Hinduism, as some empires based on Buddhist culture were established around the same period. The Indonesian archipelago has witnessed the rise and fall of powerful Buddhist empires such as Shailendra dynasty, Srivijaya and Mataram Empires. The arrival of Buddhism was started with trading activities that began in the early first century on the Silk Road between Indonesia and India. According to some Chinese sources, a Chinese monk on his journey to India, witnessed the powerful maritime empire of Srivijaya based in Sumatra. The empire also served as a Buddhist learning centre in the region. Some historical heritage monuments can be found in Indonesia, including the Borobudur Temple in Yogyakarta and statues or prasasti (inscriptions) from the earlier history of Buddhist empires.

Following the downfall of President Sukarno in the mid-1960s and the mandatory policy of having a religion, founder of Perbuddhi (Indonesian Buddhists Organisation), Bhikku Ashin Jinarakkhita, proposed that there was a single supreme deity, Sanghyang Adi Buddha. He was also backed up with the history behind the Indonesian version of Buddhism in ancient Javanese texts, and the shape of the Borobudur Temple.

According to the 2018 data, roughly 0.73% of Indonesians are Buddhists, which takes up about 2 million people. Most Buddhists are concentrated in Jakarta, although other provinces such as Riau, North Sumatra and West Kalimantan also have a significant number of practitioners. However, the figures are likely higher, since practitioners of Confucianism and Taoism, the latter of which is not considered an official religion, referred to themselves as Buddhists on the census. Today, most Buddhists are Chinese Indonesians and, to a lesser extent, among the Javanese and Balinese. Among the Indonesian Buddhists, the major Buddhist schools are Theravada, Mahayana, and Vajrayana. Some Chinese Indonesians follow a syncretic combination of Chinese beliefs, such as the three teachings (Tridharma) and Yiguandao (Maytreya).

=== Confucianism ===
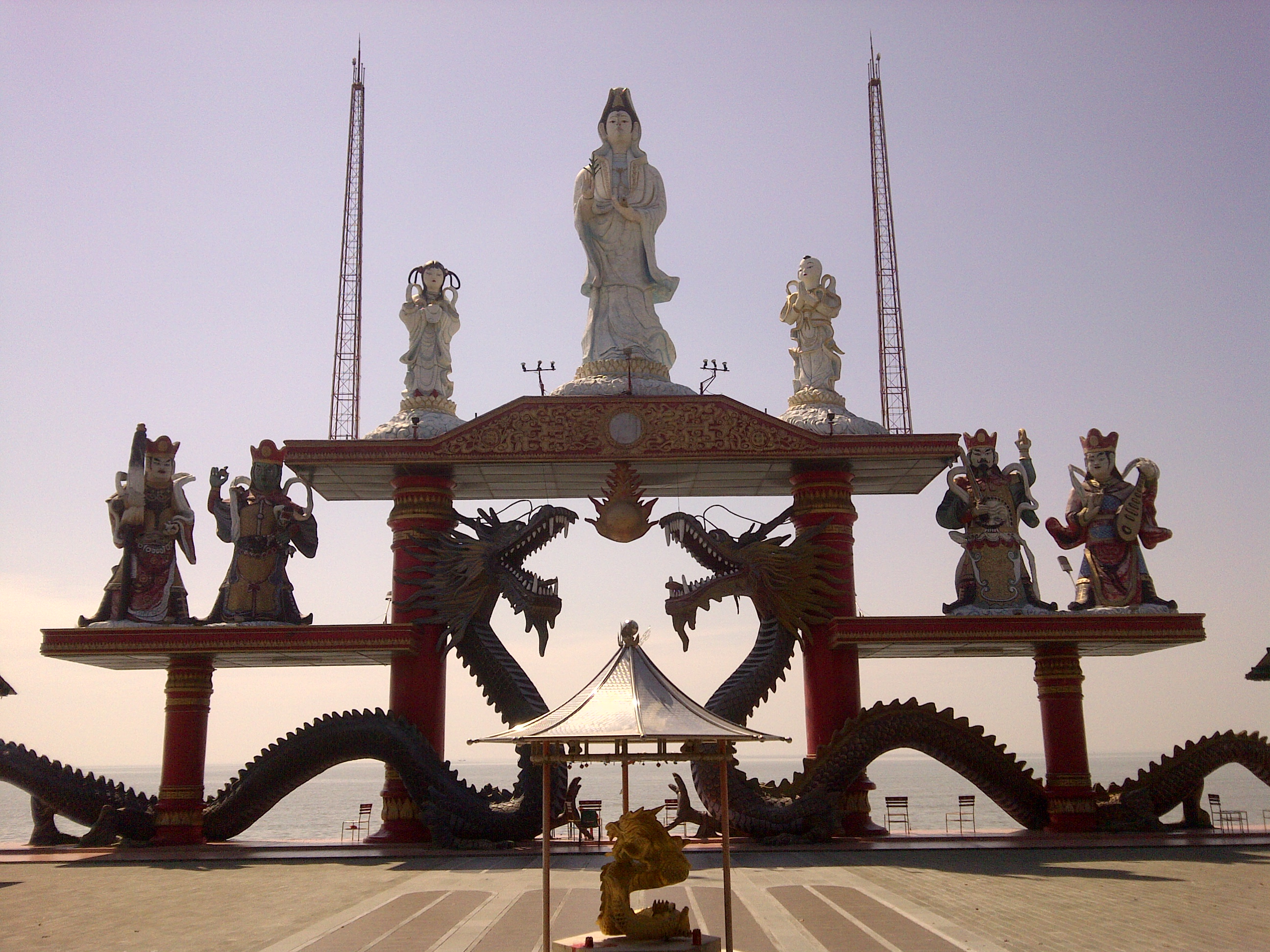
A Chinese temple of Sanggar Agung, in Surabaya, East Java

Confucians in each regency of Indonesia

Confucianism originated in China and was brought to Indonesia by Chinese merchants as early as the 3rd century AD. Unlike other religions, Confucianism evolved more into loose individual practices and belief in the code of conduct, rather than a well-organised community with a sound theology—akin to a way of life or social movement than a religion. It was not until the early 1900s that Confucianists formed an organisation, called Khong Kauw Hwe (KKH) in Batavia.

After the Indonesian independence in 1945, Confucianism was affected by several political conflicts. In 1965, Sukarno issued Presidential Decree No. 1/Pn.Ps/1965, recognising that six religions are embraced by the Indonesian people, including Confucianism. In 1961, the Association of Khung Chiao Hui Indonesia (PKCHI) (now the Supreme Council for the Confucian Religion in Indonesia) had declared that Confucianism is a religion and Confucius is their prophet.

During the New Order, the anti-China policy became a scapegoat-like method to gain political support from the masses, especially after the fall of PKI, which had allegedly been backed by China. In 1967, Suharto issued controversial Presidential Instruction No. 14/1967, which effectively banned Chinese culture, including documents printed in Chinese, expressions of Chinese belief, Chinese celebrations and festivities, and even Chinese names. However, Suharto acknowledged that the Chinese Indonesians had a large amount of wealth and power, despite consisting only 3% of the population.

In 1969, Statute No. 5/1969 was passed, restoring the official total of six religions. However, it was not always put into practice. In 1978, the Minister of Home Affairs issued a directive asserting there are only five religions, excluding Confucianism. On 27 January 1979, a presidential cabinet meeting decided that Confucianism is not a religion. Another Minister of Home Affairs directive in 1990 re-iterated the total of five official religions in Indonesia. Therefore, the status of Confucianism during the New Order regime was never clear. De jure, there were conflicting laws, because higher laws permitted Confucianism, but lower ones did not recognise it. De facto, Confucianists were not recognised by the government, and they were forced to register with one of the original five official religions to maintain their citizenship. This practice was applied in many places, including the national registration card, marriage registration, and family registration card. Civics education in Indonesia taught school children that there are only five official religions.

Following the fall of Suharto in 1998, Abdurrahman Wahid was elected as the country's fourth president. He rescinded the 1967 Presidential Instruction and the 1978 Home Affairs Ministry directive, and Confucianism once again became officially recognised as a religion in Indonesia. Chinese culture and activities were again permitted.

== Folk religions ==
=== Indigenous religions ===
Followers of aliran kepercayaan in each districts of Indonesia (2022)

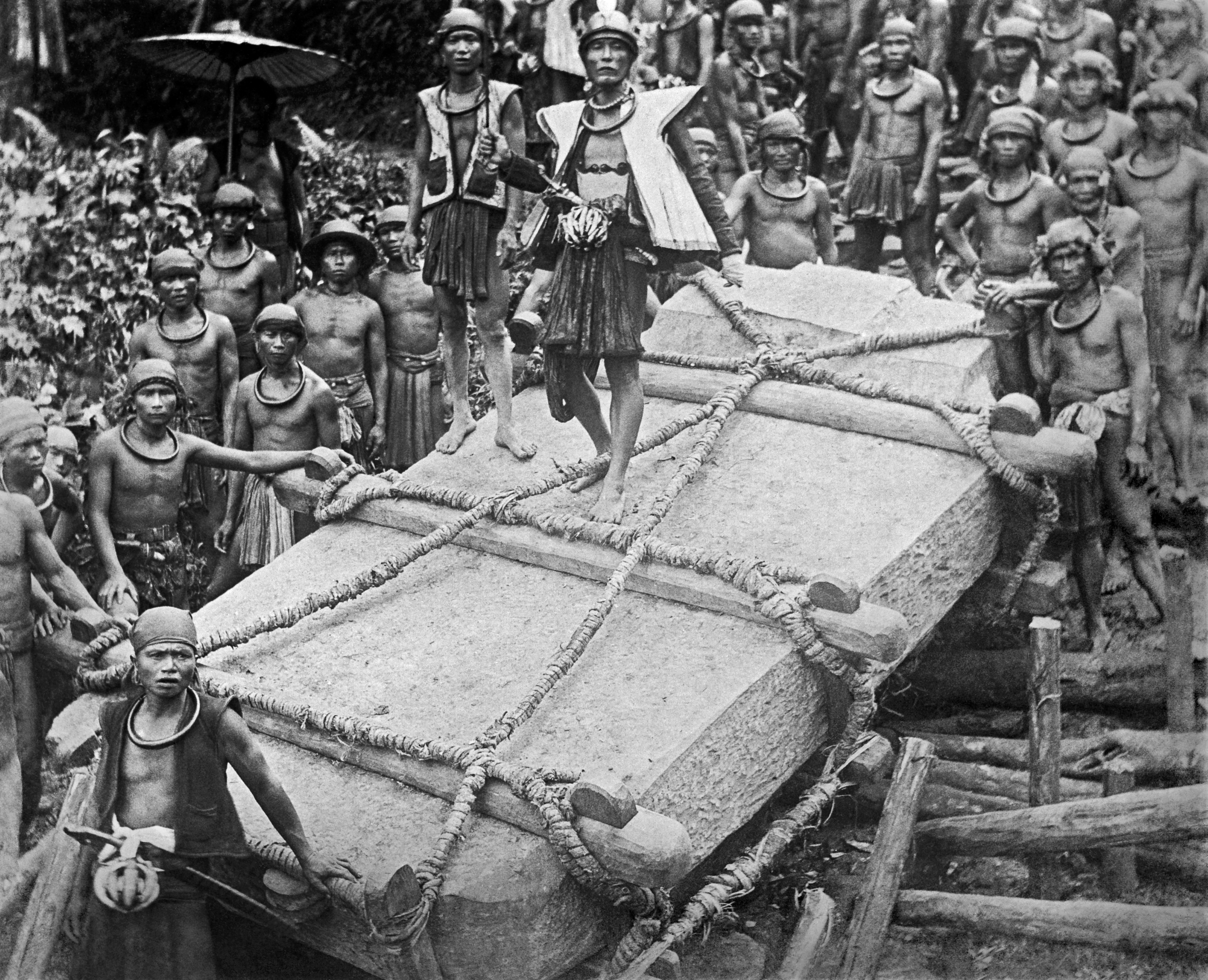
Nias tribesmen moving and erecting a megalith, c. 1915

A number of ancestral animistic/polytheistic indigenous religions (Austronesian and Papuan ethnic beliefs) are present, which were dominant throughout the archipelago before the arrival of Dharmic and Abrahamic religions. Some still exist in some parts of Indonesia as either pure or syncretic. They include:

- Batak Parmalim
- Buginese Tolotang
- Dayak Kaharingan
- Javanese Kejawèn and Kapitayan
- Karo Pemena
- Manusela Naurus
- Mentawai/Sakuddei Arat Sabulungan
- Minahasan Tonaas Walian
- Nias Fanömba adu (Pelebegu)
- Papuan (Asmat, etc.) Adat
- Sangirese Masade
- Sasak Wetu Telu
- Savu Jingi Tiu
- Sumbese Marapu
- Sundanese/Baduy Sunda Wiwitan
- Talaud Adat Musi
- Toraja Aluk Todolo, and others.

The non-official number of ethnic believers is up to 20 million. The government often views indigenous beliefs as kepercayaan adat (custom) rather than agama (religion) or as a variant of a recognised religion. Because of this, followers of these beliefs such as Dayak Kaharingan have identified themselves as Hindu as a result to avoid pressure to convert to Islam or Christianity. Several native tribal beliefs such as Sunda Wiwitan, Toraja Aluk Todolo, and Batak Parmalim—although different from Indian-influenced Balinese Hinduism—might seek affiliation with Hinduism to survive, while at the same time also preserving their distinction from mainstream Indonesian Hinduism dominated by the Balinese. In many cases, some of the followers of these native beliefs might convert to Christianity or Islam, at least registered as such on their KTP while still upholding and performing their native beliefs.

However, "the branches/flows of beliefs" (Indonesian: aliran kepercayaan), including local new religious movements, are partly recognised according to a 2017 decision of the Constitutional Court. It rules that the law requiring people whose 'religion is not recognised', or followers of indigenous religions to leave the religion column on identity documents blank is contrary to the constitution.

==== Kejawèn (Javanese beliefs) ====
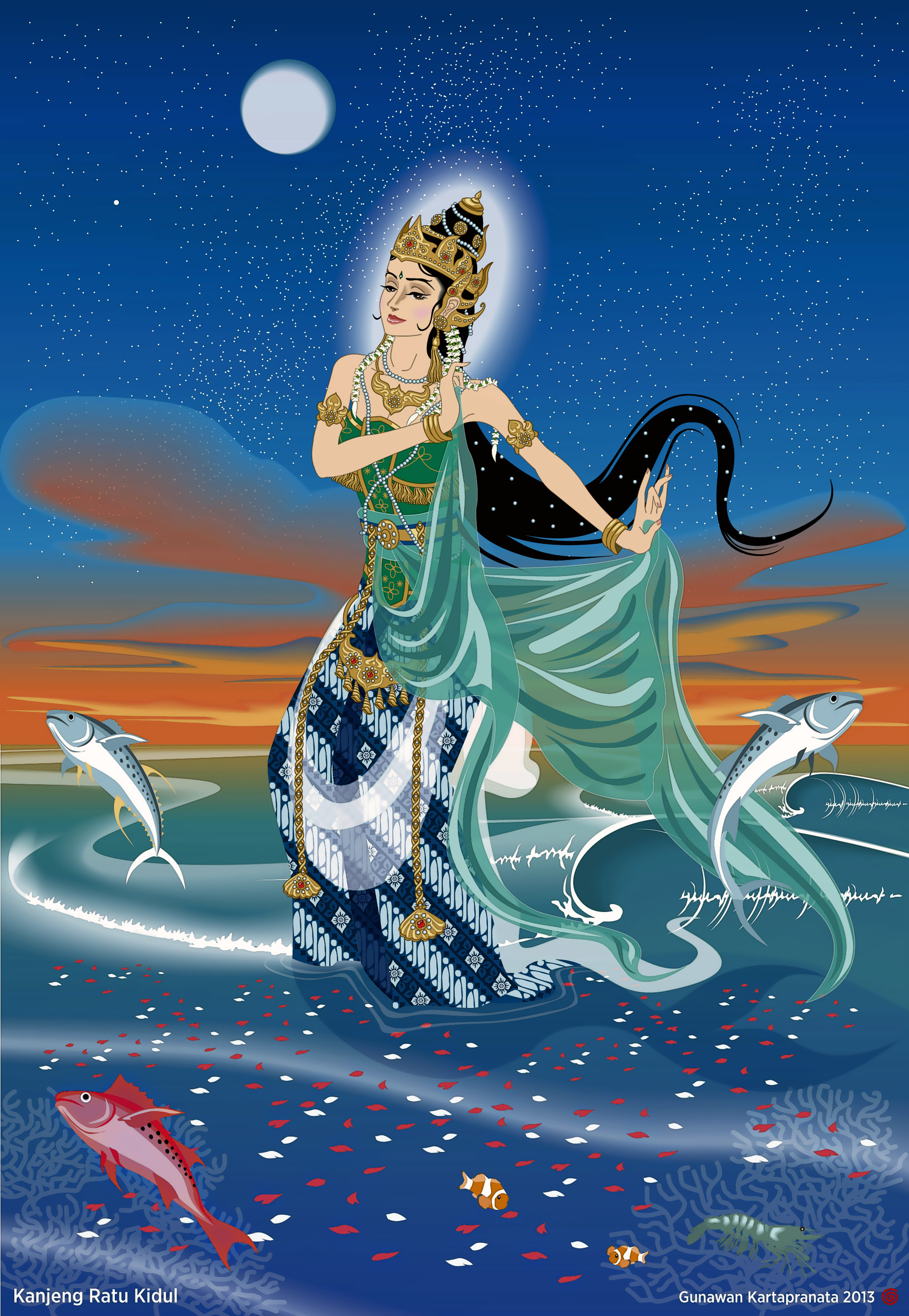
Nyai Roro Kidul, the goddess of the Southern Sea according to Javanese Kejawen, Sunda Wiwitan and Balinese Hinduism religion

Kejawèn (Javanese beliefs) or Kebatinan is an amalgam of animism, Hindu-Buddhist, and Islamic—especially Sufi—beliefs. The beliefs are rooted in Javanese history and spiritualism with the tendency to syncretise aspects of different religions in search for a common ground. Kejawèn is generally characterised as mystical, and some varieties were concerned with spiritual self-control. Although there were many varieties circulating in 1992, Kejawèn often implies pantheistic worship because it encourages sacrifices and devotions to local and ancestral spirits. These spirits are believed to inhabit natural objects, human beings, artefacts, and grave sites of the important wali (Muslim saints). Illness and other misfortunes are traced to such spirits, and if sacrifices or pilgrimages fail to placate angry deities, the advice of a dukun or healer is sought. Kejawèn, while it connotes a turning away from the aggressive universalism of orthodox Islam, moves toward a more internalised universalism. In this way, Kebatinan moves toward eliminating the distinction between the universal and the local, the communal and the individual.

The Kejawèn have no certain prophet, a sacred book, nor distinct religious festivals and rituals; it has more to do with each adherent's internalised transcendental vision and beliefs in their relations with others and with the supreme being. As a result, there is an inclusiveness that the kebatinan believer could identify themselves with one of six officially recognised religions, at least in KTP, while still subscribe to their kebatinan belief and way of life. This loosely organised current of thought and practice was legitimised in the 1945 constitution and, in 1973, when it was recognised as Kepercayaan kepada Tuhan Yang Maha Esa (Believer of One Supreme God) that somewhat gain the status as one of the agama. President Suharto regarded himself as one of its adherents.

The formal Kejawen/Kebatinan movements are Subud, Sumarah, Pangestu, Perjalanan, Amerta, and others.

==== Subud ====
Subud is an international spiritual movement that began in Indonesia in the 1920s as a movement related to Sufism and Javanese beliefs founded by Muhammad Subuh Sumohadiwidjojo. (The name Subud was first used in the late 1940s when Subud was legally registered in Indonesia.) The basis of Subud is a spiritual exercise commonly referred to as the latihan kejiwaan, which was said by Muhammad Subuh to be guidance from "the Power of God" or "the Great Life Force".

Muhammad Subuh saw the present age as one that demands personal evidence and proof of religious or spiritual realities, as people no longer just believe in words. He claimed that Subud is not a new teaching or religion, but only that the latihan kejiwaan itself is the kind of proof that humanity is looking for. There are now Subud groups in about 83 countries, with a worldwide membership of about 10,000.

==== Saminism ====
Indonesian social-religious Saminism Movement (also Sedulur Sikep) rejected the capitalist views of the colonial Dutch, was founded by Surosentiko Samin in north-central Java (Blora) in the late 19th and early 20th centuries.

==== Other ====
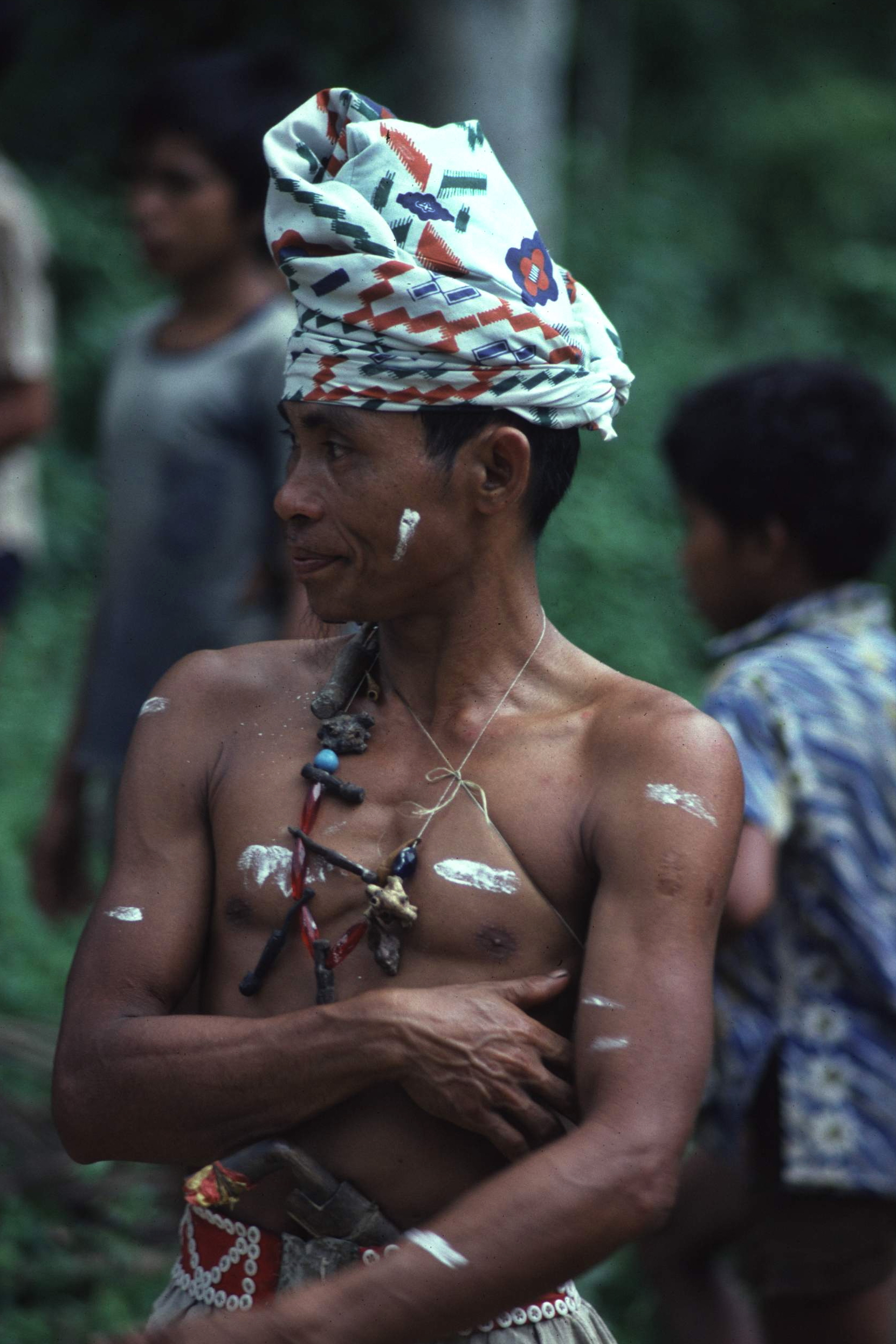
Dayak dukun (shaman)

Dukun and pawang are Indonesians' terms for a shaman (the Malays in Indonesia use word bomoh). Their societal role is that of a traditional healer, spirit medium, custom and tradition experts and on occasion sorcerers and masters of black magic. In common usage, the dukun is often confused with another type of shaman, the pawang. It is often mistranslated into English as "witch-doctor" or "medicine man". Many self-styled shamans in Indonesia are scammers and criminals, preying on gullible and superstitious people who were raised to believe in the supernatural.

== Other religions and belief systems ==
=== Judaism ===
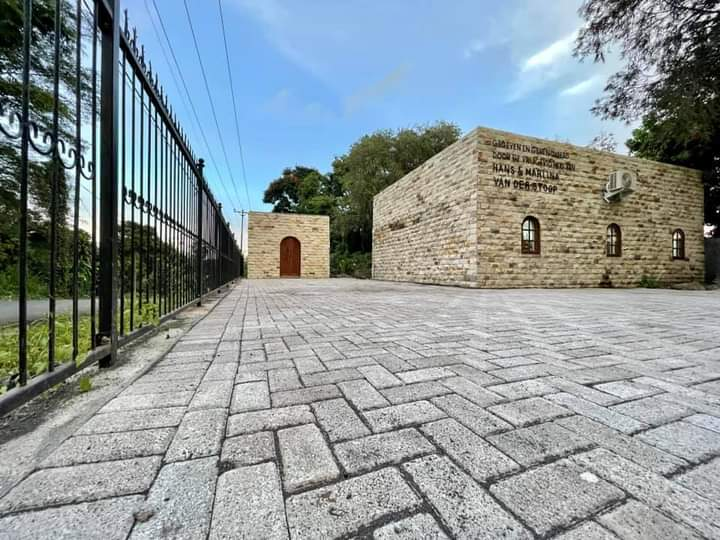
Sha'ar Hashamayim Synagogue in Tondano, North Sulawesi

The early Sephardi Jews establishment in the archipelago came from Portugal and Spain in the 17th century. In the 1850s, about 20 Jewish families of Dutch and German origins lived in Batavia. Some lived in Semarang and Surabaya. Several Baghdadi Jews also settled. Before 1945, there were about 2.000 Dutch Jews in Indonesia. Some Jews even converted to Christianity or Islam during the Japanese occupation when Jews were sent to internment camps, and the Indonesian National Revolution when Eurasians were targeted. In 1957, it was reported that around 450 Jews remained, mainly Ashkenazim in Jakarta and Sephardim in Surabaya. The community decreased to 50 in 1963 and to 20 in 1997.

Jews in Surabaya maintained a synagogue for many years, with sporadic support from relatives and co-religionists residing in Singapore. Beth Shalom closed in 2009 after radical groups protested against the Gaza war on that year. It was later designated a heritage site by the Surabaya government, but was demolished in May 2013 without warning as part of a mysterious real estate deal.

Since 2003, "Shaar Hashamayim" synagogue (unaffiliated) has been serving the local Jewish community of some 20 people in Tondano city, North Sulawesi, which is attended by around 8 Orthodox Jews. Currently, it is the only synagogue in Indonesia that provides services. besides 6 home synagogues of a mixed Jewish group run and supervised by the United Indonesian Jewish community across Indonesia

The organization "The United Indonesian Jewish Community" (UIJC) has been formed since 2009 and inaugurated in October 2010. It embraces all Jewish streams (orthodox and egalitarian) members with 180 certified Jews. UIJC has coverage of 8 areas across Indonesia from Sumatra to Papua. The first Indonesian Jewish Rabbi, Rabbi Benjamin Meijer Verbrugge (Dr. Benny Meijer) came from UIJC. He got his smicha/ordination as Para Rabbi by Rabbi Jonathan Ginsburg and Rabbi Steven Jules Peskind from Rodfei Kodesh Jewish Learning Institute Chicago in 2013, and he got his smicha/ordination as a full rabbi from Rabbi Joseph H. Gelberman Rabbinical Seminary International New York (Modern Chasidic) in 2015. The ordination took place at The Actors' Temple, officially named Congregation Ezrath Israel, is a non-denominational Jewish synagogue located at 339 West 47th Street, Manhattan New York, July 2, 2015.

In 2015, the group under AM Christian Denomination, claiming as a Jewish community "Beit Torat Chaim", was inaugurated by the Religious Affairs Ministry as a Christian Church. It is located in Jakarta and will be led by Rabbi Tovia Singer. Tovia already left Indonesia.

=== Bahá'í Faith ===
According to the Association of Religion Data Archives in the Bahá'í Faith in Indonesia made up 0.01% of the population in 2020.

The community is subject to a measure of government discrimination. Since 2014, the situation has improved in the form of government plans for possible recognition (there was an erroneous opinion on already held the official recognition of the Bahai in 2014).

=== Sikhism ===
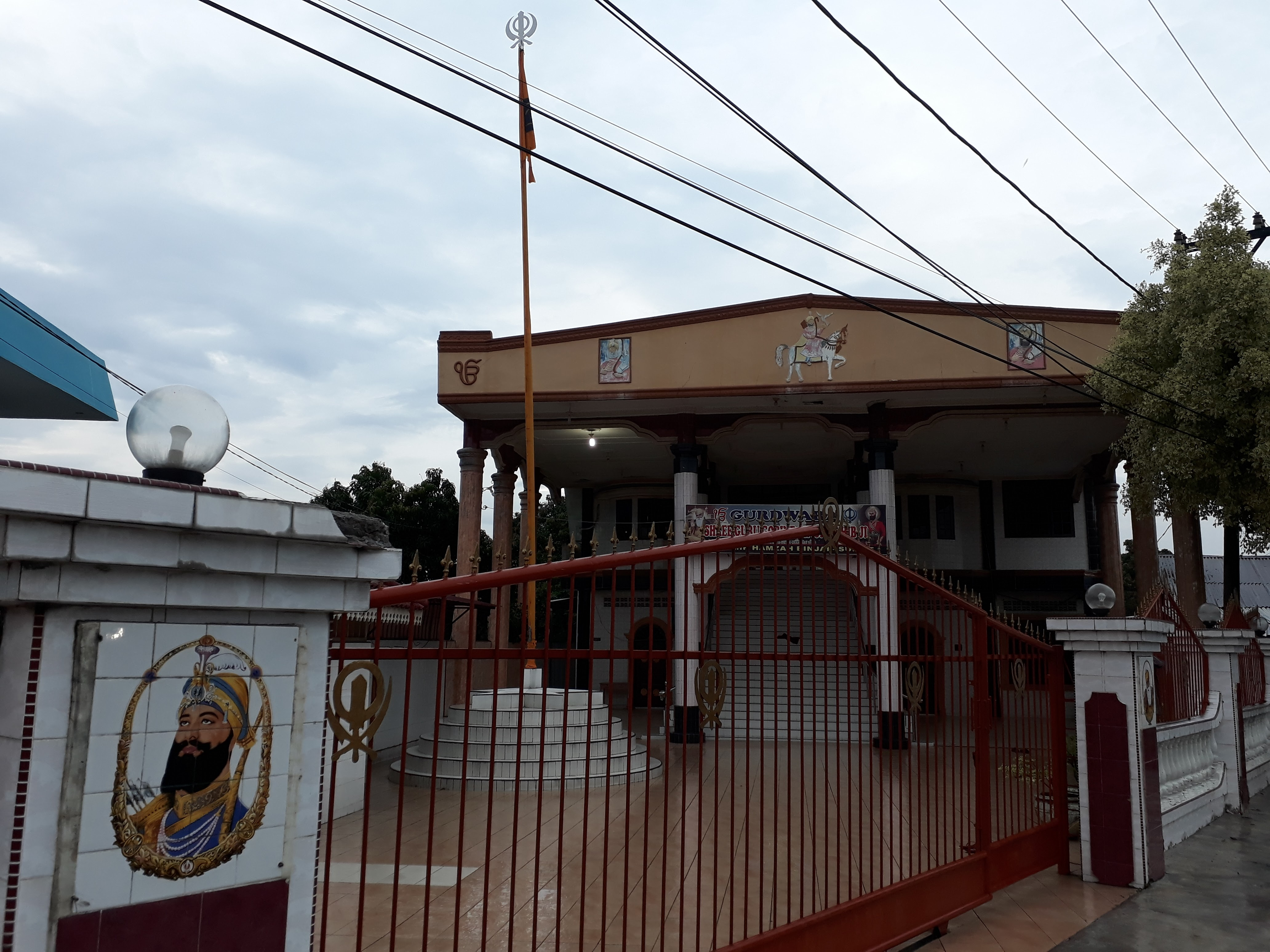
Shree Guru Gobind Singh Sahib Ji Sikh Gurdwara in Binjai, North Sumatra

Sikhs migration to Indonesia began in the 1870s (guardians and traders). There are several gurdwaras and schools in Sumatra and Java, for example, in Medan was built in 1911. In 2015, the Supreme Council for the Sikh Religion in Indonesia was founded. Numbering between 10.000 and 15.000 in 2022, Sikhs are not officially recognised by the government, resulting in adherents referring to themselves as Hindus on the KTP.

=== Jainism ===
A small Jain community, Jain Social Group Indonesia (JSG Indonesia), exists in Jakarta among Indian Indonesians.

=== Shinto ===
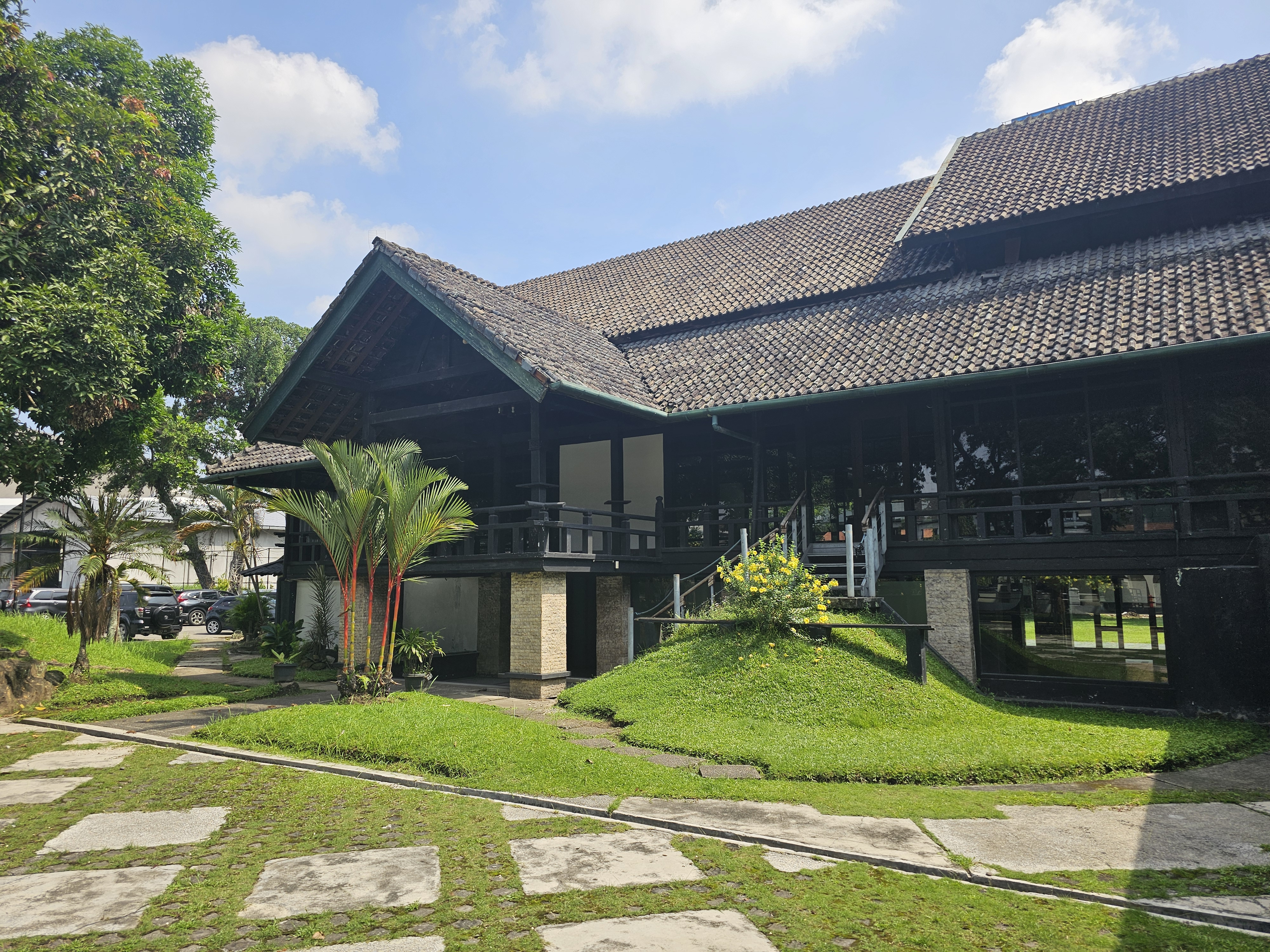
Hirohara Jinja in Medan remains as the last Japanese Shinto shrine in Southeast Asia after World War II.

During the Japanese occupation, State Shinto was imposed on the territory, leading to the construction of 11 shrines, including the Hokoku Shrine, the Ching Nan Shrine, and the Hirohara Shrine. After World War II, most of these Shinto shrines were destroyed or abandoned, leaving the Hirohara Shrine as the only surviving Shinto shrine in Indonesia.

=== New religious movements ===
The most famous of the new religious movements in Indonesia are Theosophical Society, Transcendental Meditation movement, Falun Gong, Radha Soami Satsang Beas (RSSB), and originated in Indonesia Subud and Eden community (Jamaah Salamullah).

== Irreligion ==
=== Atheism ===
Although there is no specific law that bans atheism, legal cases in which atheists have been charged with blasphemy for publicly expressing atheist points of view have raised the issue of whether it is de facto illegal to do so according to Pancasila. Some clerics invoke the first Pancasila principle to argue that it is illegal, while legal scholars say that the principle was adopted as a compromise between secular nationalist, Muslim and non-Muslim founders, and not intended to ban atheism. Nonetheless, atheists as a group tend not to express their atheism publicly for fear of prosecution.

In 2012, civil servant Alexander Aan was sentenced to 30 months in prison for writing "God doesn't exist" on his Facebook page and sharing explicit material about Muhammad online, sparking nationwide debate. Alexander's lawyers speculated that there were only around 2,000 atheists in Indonesia, but stated that it was difficult to estimate due to the threat of imprisonment for open atheism.

== Interfaith relations ==
Although the government recognises several different religions, inter-religious conflicts have occurred. During the New Order, President Suharto proposed the Anti-Chinese law which prohibits anything related to Chinese culture, including names and religions. Suharto also made an effort to "de-Islamicise" the government, by maintaining a large proportion of Christians in his cabinet. However, in the early 1990s, the issue of Islamisation appeared, and the military split into two groups, the Nationalist and Islamic camps. The latter, led by General Prabowo Subianto, was in favour of Islamisation, while General Wiranto was in the former in favour of a secular state.

During the New Order, the transmigration program continued after it was initiated by the Dutch East Indies government in the early nineteenth century. The intention was to move millions of people from overcrowded and populated Java, Bali and Madura to less populated regions, such as Ambon, Lesser Sunda Islands and Papua. It has received much criticism, being described as a type of colonisation by the Javanese and Madurese who also brought Islam to non-Muslim areas. Citizens in western Indonesia are mostly Muslims with Christians a small minority, while in eastern regions, the Christian populations are similar in size or larger than the Muslim population. This more even population distribution has led to more religious conflicts in the eastern regions, including Poso riots and the Maluku sectarian conflict communal violence since the resignation of President Suharto.

The government has made an effort to reduce the tension by proposing the inter-religion cooperation plan. The Foreign Ministry, along with the most prominent Islamic organisation in Indonesia, Nahdatul Ulama, held the International Conference of Islamic Scholars, to promote Islamic moderation, which is believed to reduce the tension in the country. On 6 December 2004, the "Dialogue On Interfaith Cooperation: Community Building and Harmony" conference was opened. The meeting, attended by ASEAN countries, Australia, East Timor, New Zealand and Papua New Guinea was intended to discuss possible cooperation between different religious groups to minimise inter-religious conflict in Indonesia.

Nevertheless, the 2010 report to the United States Congress by the United States Commission on International Religious Freedom noted attacks against the Shia communities in Indonesia, particularly in East Java and Madura. In one incident in Madura, local villagers surrounded Shia houses and demanded they desist religious activities, but the crowd was dispersed by local leaders and clergy. On the issue of the Ahmadiyya, Indonesia has failed to act and uphold their human rights. Several Ahmadi mosques were burnt in 2008. 126 Ahmadis have become refugees within their own country in the four years before 2012.

There is, however, indications that religious conflicts regarding the building of places of worships have more to do with business interest than in religious issues. For example, the dispute over a Bethel Injil Sepenuh Church (GBIS) in Jakarta was due to land dispute dating back to 1957, while the Indonesia Christian Church (GKI) Taman Yasmin dispute in Bogor was due to the municipal government plan to turn the church's area into a business district. The Taman Yasmin Church in Bogor has been upheld and protected by Supreme Court of Indonesia, but the mayor of Bogor refused to comply with the court ruling. A positive form of relations has also appeared in society, such as the effort from six different religious organisations to help the 2004 tsunami victims. In 2011, the interfaith 'Indonesia Sunni and Shia Council' (MUHSIN) was established.

In 2017, the blasphemy trial of Basuki Tjahaja Purnama (Ahok) received international attention. In 2016, at a campaign stop during the capital city's gubernatorial election, Ahok stated some citizens would not vote for him because they were being "threatened and deceived" by those using the verse Al-Ma'ida 51 of the Qur'an and variations of it. After a university lecturer, Buni Yani edited the video containing his speech, widespread protests against him ensued, culminating in his controversial imprisonment in May 2017. The Joko Widodo administration responded by banning the Indonesian chapter of Hizb ut-Tahrir. Subsequent government attempts, particularly by the country's intelligence agency (BIN), in curbing radicalism has been called an attack on Islam by some sectarian figures.

== Census data regarding religion ==
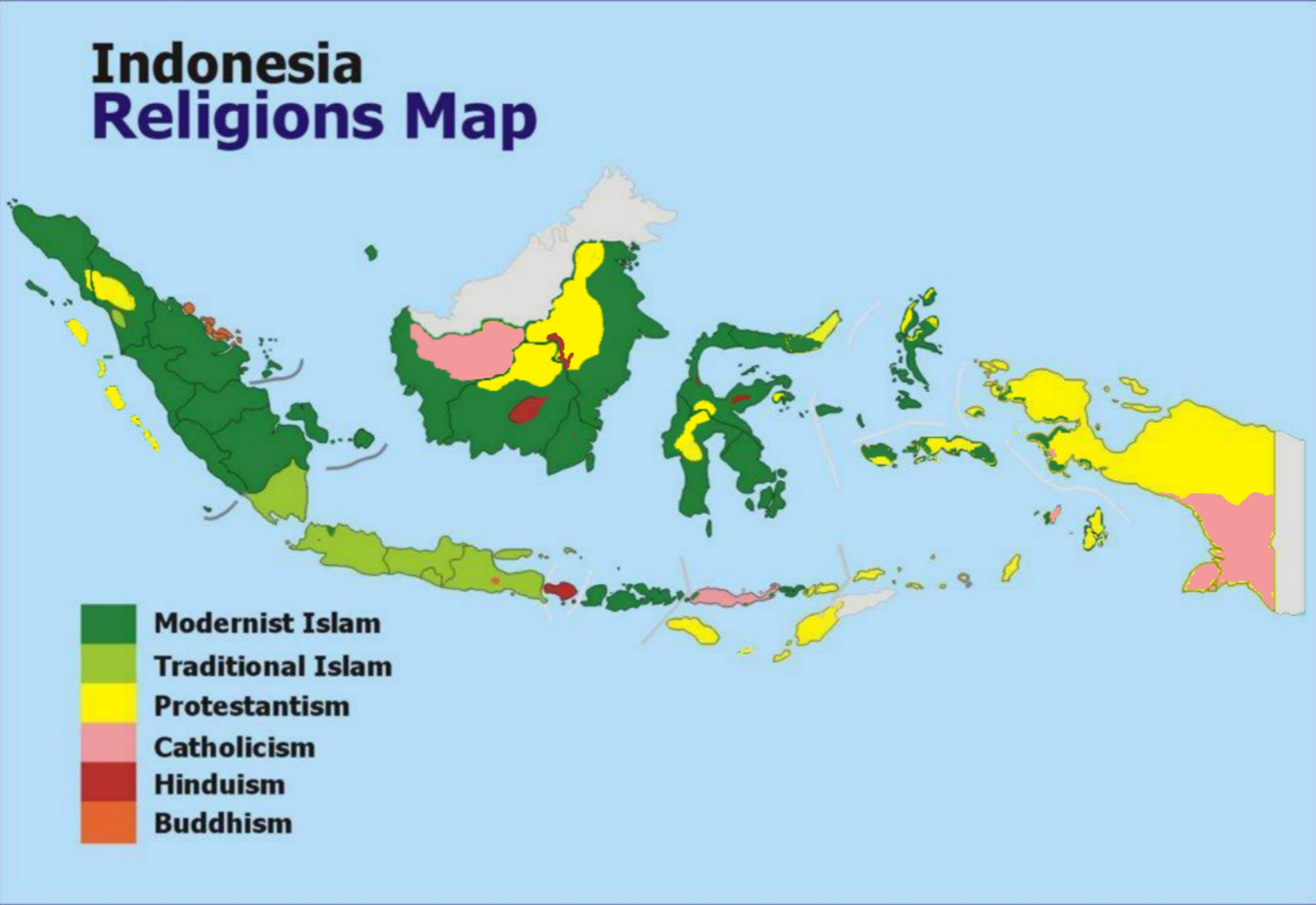
Religious map of Indonesia by 2011

Religion was a census variable in the 1961, 1971, 1980, 1990, 2000, and 2010 and in various intercensal surveys. Being deemed divisive, the 1961 census data regarding religion was not published. In 1971, three groups of Christians were recorded: Catholic, Protestant and other. The U.N. Demographic Yearbook 1979 only lists data collectively for all Christians. In the 2000 census, only Catholics and Protestants were available as categories.

Religion Data in Indonesia Census (Population in millions and Percent)
	1971		1980		1985		1990		2000		2005		2010	
Muslim	103.58	87.51%	128.46	87.94%	142.59	86.92%	156.32	87.21%	177.53	88.22%	189.01	88.58%	207,18	87.18%
Protestant	8.74	7.39%	8.51	5.82%	10.59	6.46%	10.82	6.04%	11.82	5.87%	12.36	5.79%	16.53	6.96%
Catholic	8.74	7.39%	4.36	2.98%	5.14	3.13%	6.41	3.58%	6.13	3.05%	6.56	3.07%	6.91	2.91%
Hindu	2.30	1.94%	4.76	3.26%	3.18	1.94%	3.29	1.83%	3.65	1.81%	3.70	1.73%	4.01	1.69%
Buddhist	1.09	0.92%	4.76	3.26%	1.60	0.98%	1.84	1.03%	1.69	0.84%	1.30	0.61%	1.70	0.72%
Confucian	0.97	0.82%	4.76	3.26%	0.95	0.58%	0.57	0.32%	0.41	0.20%	0.21	0.10%	0.12	0.05%
Other	1.69	1.42%	4.76	3.26%	0.95	0.58%	0.57	0.32%	0.41	0.20%	0.24	0.11%	0.30	0.13%
Unstated	1.69	1.42%	4.76	3.26%	0.95	0.58%	0.57	0.32%	0.41	0.20%	0.24	0.11%	0.14	0.06%
Not asked	1.69	1.42%	4.76	3.26%	0.95	0.58%	0.57	0.32%	0.41	0.20%	0.24	0.11%	0.76	0.32%
Total	118.37		146.08		164.05		179.25		201.24		213.38		237.64	

Note: the drop in the Catholic population between 1990 and 2000 was due to the secession of East Timor in 1999.

=== Religious composition by ethnic group (2010 Census) ===
Ethnic Group	Muslims	Christians	Hindus	Buddhists	Confucians	Others	Total
Javanese	92,107,046	2,428,121	160,090	90,465	2,857	9,599	94,788,943
Sundanese	36,450,022	29,332	1,851	24,528	4,854	155,308	36,665,892
Malay	8,643,370	8,484	1,031	19,848	1,243	242	8,751,218
Batak	3,738,660	4,707,658	1,476	9,190	315	6,305	8,463,604
Madurese	7,157,518	7,695	368	435	32	43	7,166,091
Betawi	6,607,019	151,429	1,161	39,278	1,805	252	6,800,943
Minangkabau	6,441,071	1,822	179	1,255	49	44	6,459,420
Buginese	6,348,200	35,516	26,102	957	47	2,395	6,413,217
Bantenese	4,634,374	4,810	101	2,680	70	242	4,642,277
Banjarese	4,108,104	15,775	994	1,396	62	410	4,126,741
Balinese	127,274	49,385	3,736,993	10,378	142	473	3,924,645
Acehnese	3,398,818	403	70	1,028	7	4	3,403,961
Dayak	1,016,697	2,017,870	12,140	17,502	568	154,219	3,218,996
Sasak	3,153,671	5,540	4,555	10,682	7	439	3,174,894
Chinese	131,682	1,211,692	3,552	1,388,829	94,005	1,114	2,830,874
Others	23,057,923	12,436,323	63,909	73,027	9,422	117,848	35,758,452
Total	207,121,449	23,359,556	4,005,337	1,691,478	115,485	296,864	236,590,169

In 2025, based on civil registration data from Ministry of Home Affairs, 87.15% of Indonesians are Muslims, 10.44% Christians (7.37% Protestants, 3.07% Roman Catholic), 1.66% Hindu, 0.75% Buddhists, Confucians and indigenous beliefs.

== See also ==
- Abangan
- Culture of Indonesia
- Demographics of Indonesia
- Mythology of Indonesia

== Bibliography ==
The following list of selected printed bibliographies on the topic includes both cited works and further reading.

- Abuza, Zachary (2007). Political Islam and Violence in Indonesia. London; New York: Routledge. ISBN 978-0-415-39401-7.
- Acri, Andrea; Creese, Helen; Griffiths, Arlo, eds. (2011). From Lanka Eastwards: The Ramayaṇa in the Literature and Visual Arts of Indonesia. Leiden: KITLV Press.
- Ali, A. Mukti (1975). "Islam in Indonesia". Handbook of Oriental Studies. Section 3. Southeast Asia, Religions. Leiden: Brill. pp. 55–80.
- Ali, Muhamad (2009). Bridging Islam and the West: An Indonesian View. Jakarta: Ushul Press, Faculty of Ushuluddin, the State Islamic University. ISBN 978-979-25-1295-3.
- ——— (2016). Islam and Colonialism: Becoming Modern in Indonesia and Malaya. Edinburgh: Edinburgh University Press. ISBN 978-1-4744-0920-9.
- Arif, Nasr M.; Panakkal, Abbas, eds. (2024). Southeast Asian Islam: Integration and Indigenisation. London; New York: Routledge. ISBN 978-1-032-45169-5.
- Aritonang, Jan Sihar; Steenbrink, Karel, eds. (2008). A History of Christianity in Indonesia. Leiden; Boston: Brill. ISBN 978-90-04-17026-1.
- Atjeh, Aboebakar (1977). Aliran Syiah di Nusantara [Shia Branch in Nusantara] (in Indonesian). Jakarta: Islamic Research Institute.
- Azra, Azyumardi (2006). Islam in the Indonesian World: An Account of Institutional Formation. Bandung: Mizan Pustaka. ISBN 978-979-433-430-0.
- Bakke., Frederik Lambertus (1993). The Struggle of the Hindu Balinese Intellectuals: Developments in Modern Hindu Thinking in Independent Indonesia. Amsterdam: VU University Press. ISBN 978-9053832219.
- Baskara, Benny (2017). "Islamic Puritanism Movements in Indonesia as Transnational Movements". DINIKA: Academic Journal of Islamic Studies. 2 (1): 1–22. doi:10.22515/dinika.v2i1.103. ISSN 2503-4219.
- Beatty, Andrew (1999). Varieties of Javanese Religion: An Anthropological Account. Cambridge: Cambridge University Press. ISBN 978-0-521-62444-2.
- Belo, Jane (1960). Trance in Bali. New York: Columbia University Press.
- Benda, Harry J.; Castles, Lance (1969). "The Samin Movement". Bijdragen tot de Taal-, Land- en Volkenkunde. 125 (2): 207–40. doi:10.1163/22134379-90002844. ISSN 2213-4379.
- Bertrand, Jaques (2004). Nationalism and Ethnic Conflict in Indonesia. Cambridge: Cambridge University Press. ISBN 978-0-521-52441-4. OCLC 237830260.
- Boelaars, Huub J. W. M. (1991). Indonesianisasi, Het omvormingsproces van de katholieke kerk in Indonesië tot de Indonesische katholieke kerk (in Dutch). J.H. Kok. ISBN 978-9024268023.
- Brown, Iem (1987). "Contemporary Indonesian Buddhism and Monotheism". Journal of Southeast Asian Studies. 18 (1): 108–17. doi:10.1017/S0022463400001284. S2CID 161832997.
- ——— (1990). "Agama Buddha Maitreya: A Modern Buddhist Sect in Indonesia". Southeast Asian Anthropology (9).
- Budiman, Michaela (2013). Contemporary Funeral Rituals of Sa'dan Toraja: From Aluk Todolo to "New" Religions. Prague: Charles University in Prague. ISBN 978-80-246-2228-6.
- Buehler, Michael (2016). The Politics of Shari'a Law: Islamist Activist and the State in Democratizing Indonesia. Cambridge: Cambridge University Press. ISBN 978-1-107-13022-7.
- Burgess, Stanley M.; Maas, Eduard M. van der, eds. (2002). "Indonesia". The New International Dictionary of Pentecostal and Charismatic Movements (Rev. and exp. ed.). Grand Rapids, Mi: Zondervan. pp. 126–32. ISBN 978-0-310-22481-5.
- Burhani, Ahmad Najib (2014). "The Ahmadiyya and the Study of Comparative Religion in Indonesia: Controversies and Influences" (PDF). Islam and Christian-Muslim Relations. 25 (2): 141–58. doi:10.1080/09596410.2013.864191. S2CID 145427321. Archived from the original (PDF) on 4 April 2016.
- Burhanudin, Jajat; Dijk, Kees van, eds. (2013). Islam in Indonesia: Contrasting Images and Interpretations. ICAS Publications Series, 16. Amsterdam: Amsterdam University Press. ISBN 978-90-8964-423-7.
- Chambert-Loir, Henri (April 2015). "Confucius Crosses the South Seas". Indonesia. 99 (99). Southeast Asia Program Publications at Cornell University: 67–107. doi:10.5728/indonesia.99.0067. ISSN 2164-8654.
- Cheu, Hock Tong (1999). Chinese Beliefs and Practices in Southeast Asia: Studies on the Chinese Religion in Malaysia, Singapore and Indonesia. Singapore: Pelanduk Publications. ISBN 978-9679784527.
- Chia, Jack Meng-tat (2020). Monks in Motion: Buddhism and Modernity Across the South China Sea. Oxford; New York: Oxford University Press. ISBN 9780197613672.
- Cooley, Frank L. (1968). Indonesia: Church and Society. New York: Friendship Press. ISBN 978-0-377-18021-5.
- Crouch, Melissa (2014). Law and Religion in Indonesia: Conflict and the courts in West Java. London; New York: Routledge. ISBN 978-0-415-83594-7.
- Domenig, Gaudenz (2014). Religion and Architecture in Premodern Indonesia: Studies in Spatial Anthropology. Leiden; Boston: BRILL. ISBN 978-90-04-27400-6.
- Duncan, Christopher R. (2013). Violence and Vengeance: Religious Conflict and Its Aftermath in Eastern Indonesia. Ithaca, NY; London: Cornell University Press. ISBN 978-0-8014-7913-7.
- Ensiklopedi Kepercayaan terhadap Tuhan Yang Maha Esa [Encyclopedia of Beliefs in One God] (in Indonesian) (4th ed.). Jakarta: Direktorat Jenderal Nilai Budaya, Seni dan Film; Direktorat Kepercayaan Terhadap Tuhan Yang Maha Esa. 2010. ISBN 978-979-16071-1-7. Archived from the original (PDF) on 9 July 2022.
- Epton, Nina Consuelo (1974). Magic and Mysticism in Java (revised ed.). London: Octagon Press. ISBN 978-0-900860-39-3.
- Federspiel, Howard M. (1970). Persatuan Islam: Islamic Reform in Twentieth century Indonesia. Ithaca, NY: Cornell University Modern Indonesia Project.
- ——— (1993). The Usage of Tradition of The Prophet in Contemporary Indonesia. Tempe, Ar: Arizona State University Program for Southeast Asian Studies. ISBN 9781881044116.
- Fogg, Kevin W. (2020). Indonesia's Islamic Revolution. Cambridge: Cambridge University Press. ISBN 978-110-876-821-4.
- Fox, James J. (1996). Auger, Timothy (ed.). Indonesian Heritage: Religion and ritual. Indonesian Heritage Series. Vol. 9. Singapore: Archipelago Press. ISBN 978-9813018587.
- Fox, Richard (2011). Critical Reflections on Religion and Media in Contemporary Bali. Leiden; Boston: BRILL. ISBN 978-90-04-17649-2.
- Frederick, William H.; Worden, Robert L., eds. (2011). Indonesia: A Country Study. Area handbook series, 39. Library of Congress, Federal Research Division (6th ed.). Washington, DC: U.S. Government Printing Office. ISBN 978-0-8444-0790-6.
- Freedman, Amy L. (2020). "Religious Minorities in Southeast Asia: The Ahmadiyah and Why Tolerance Matters". In Verma, Vidhu; Rathore, Aakash Singh (eds.). Secularism, Religion, and Democracy in Southeast Asia. Oxford: Oxford University Press. pp. 135–160. ISBN 978-0-19-909877-4.
- Gade, Anna M. (2004). Perfection Makes Practice: Learning, Emotion, and the Recited Qur’ân in Indonesia. Honolulu: University of Hawaii Press. ISBN 0-8248-2599-3.
- Geels, Antoon (1997). Subud and the Javanese mystical tradition. Richmond, Surrey: Curzon Press. ISBN 978-0-7007-0623-5.
- Geertz, Clifford (1960). Religion of Java. Glencoe, IL: Free Press. ISBN 978-0-226-28510-8.
- ——— (1968). Islam Observed, Religious Development in Morocco and Indonesia. Chicago; London: University of Chicago Press. ISBN 978-0-226-28511-5.
- ——— (1972). "Religious Change and Social Order in Soeharto's Indonesia". Asia (27): 62–84.
- ——— (1973). The Interpretation of Cultures: Selected Essays. New York: Basic Books. ISBN 978-0-465-09719-7.
- Goh, Robbie B. H. (2005). "Chap. 5. Indonesia". Christianity in Southeast Asia. Singapore: ISEAS: Institute of Southeast Asian Studies Publications. pp. 57–64. ISBN 9812302972.
- Gonda, Jan (1975). "The Indian Religions in Pre-Islamic Indonesia and their survival in Bali". Handbook of Oriental Studies. Section 3. Southeast Asia, Religions. Leiden: Brill. pp. 1–54.
- Goris, Roelof (1931). The Island of Bali; Its Religion and Ceremonies. Amsterdam: Royal Packet Navigation Company.
- Gross, L. Max (2016). A Muslim archipelago: Islam and Politics in Southeast Asia. Washington, D.C.: National Defense Intelligence College. ISBN 978-1-932946-19-2.
- Hadiwijono, Harun (1967). Man in the present Javanese Mysticism. Baarn: Bosch & Keuning.
- Hasan, Noorhaidi (2007). "The Salafi Movement in Indonesia: Transnational Dynamics and Local Development". Comparative Studies of South Asia, Africa and the Middle East. 27 (1). Duke University Press: 83–94. doi:10.1215/1089201x-2006-045. ISSN 1089-201X. S2CID 145214346.
- Hasyim, Syafiq (2020). "The Secular and the Religious: Secularization and Shariatization in Indonesia". In Verma, Vidhu; Rathore, Aakash Singh (eds.). Secularism, Religion, and Democracy in Southeast Asia. Oxford: Oxford University Press. pp. 111–134. ISBN 978-0-19-909877-4.
- Hauser-Schäublin, Brigitta; Harnish, David D., eds. (2014). Between Harmony and Discrimination. Negotiating Religious Identities within Majority-minority Relationships in Bali and Lombok. Leiden; Boston: BRILL. ISBN 978-90-04-27125-8.
- Headley, Stephen C. (2004). Durga's Mosque: Cosmology, Conversion And Community in Central Javanese Islam. Singapure: ISEAS: Institute of Southeast Asian Studies. ISBN 978-981-230-242-7.
- Hefner, Robert W. (1989). Hindu Javanese: Tengger Tradition and Islam. Princeton, NJ: Princeton University Press. ISBN 978-0-691-09413-7.
- Heidhues, Mary Somers (1997). "Chinese Identity in the Diaspora: Religion and Language in West Kalimantan, Indonesia". In Kuhnt-Saptodewo, Sri; Grabowsky, Volker; Großheim, Martin (eds.). Nationalism and Cultural Revival in Southeast Asia: Perspectives from the Centre and Region. Wiesbaden: Harrassowitz Verlag. pp. 201–10. ISBN 3-447-03958-2.
- Hooykaas, Christiaan (1974). "Cosmogony and Creation in Balinese Tradition". Bibliotheca Indonesica. The Hague: Martinus Nijhoff. ISSN 0067-8023.
- Hosen, Nadirsyah (2005). "Religion and the Indonesian Constitution: A Recent Debate". Journal of Southeast Asian Studies. 36 (3): 419–40. doi:10.1017/S0022463405000238. ISBN 978-1-351-56077-1. S2CID 1636786.
- Howe, Leo (2001). Hinduism & Hierarchy in Bali. Oxford: James Currey. ISBN 978-0-85255-914-7.
- Howell, Julia Day (2001). "Sufism and the Indonesian Islamic Revival". The Journal of Asian Studies. 60 (3): 701–29. doi:10.2307/2700107. hdl:10072/3954. JSTOR 2700107. S2CID 145699011.
- Husain, Sarkawi B. (2017). Sejarah Masyarakat Islam Indonesia (in Indonesian). Surabaya: Airlangga University press. ISBN 978-602-6606-47-1.
- Ida, Achmah (2016). "Cyberspace and Sectarianism in Indonesia: The Rise of Shia Media and Anti-Shia Online Movements" (PDF). Jurnal Komunikasi Islam. 6 (2). Universitas Islam Negeri Sunan Ampel Surabaya: 194–215. ISSN 2088-6314.
- Intan, Benyamin Fleming (2006). "Public religion" and the Pancasila-based state of Indonesia: an ethical and sociological analysis. New York: Peter Lang. ISBN 978-0-8204-7603-2.
- Kahlon, Swarn Singh (2016). "Chap. 5. Sikhs in Indonesia: Sikhs not Recognized as a Separate Religius Group". Sikhs in Asia Pacific: Travels among the Sikh Diaspora from Yangon to Kobe (PDF). New Delhi: Manohar Publisher. ISBN 978-9350981207.
- Kimura, Bunki (2003). "Present Situation of Indonesian Buddhism: In Memory of Bhikkhu Ashin Jinarakkhita Mahasthavira" (PDF). Nagoya Studies in Indian Culture and Buddhism: Sambhasa (23): 53–72. Archived from the original (PDF) on 25 March 2014.
- Kinney, Ann R.; Klokke, Marijke J.; Kieven, Lydia (2003). Worshiping Siva and Buddha: The Temple Art of East Java. Honolulu: University of Hawaii Press. ISBN 978-0-8248-2779-3.
- Kipp, Rita Smith (1993). Dissociated Identities: Ethnicity, Religion, and Class in an Indonesian Society. Ann Arbor, Mich.: University of Michigan Press. ISBN 978-0-472-10412-3.
- Koentjaraningrat, R. M. (1987). "Javanese Religion". In Eliade, Mircea (ed.). The Encyclopedia of Religion. Vol. 7. New York: MacMillan. pp. 559–63. ISBN 978-0-02-909480-8.
- Kraus, Werner (1997). "Transformations of a Religious Community: The Shattariyya Sufi Brotherhood in Aceh". In Kuhnt-Saptodewo, Sri; Grabowsky, Volker; Großheim, Martin (eds.). Nationalism and Cultural Revival in Southeast Asia: Perspectives from the Centre and Region. Wiesbaden: Harrassowitz Verlag. pp. 169–89. ISBN 978-3-447-03958-1.
- Kroef, Justus M. van der (1961). "New Religious Sects in Java". Far Eastern Survey. 30 (2): 18–25. doi:10.2307/3024260. JSTOR 3024260. Archived from the original on 29 March 2019.
- Krüger, Müller (1975). "Das Christentum in Indonesien" [Kekristenan di Indonesia]. Handbook of Oriental Studies. Section 3. Southeast Asia, Religions (in German). Leiden: Brill. pp. 135–162.
- Laffan, Michael (2011). The Makins of Indonesian Islam: orientalism and the narration of a Sufi past. Princeton, NJ: Princeton University Press. ISBN 978-0-691-14530-3.
- Lansing, J. Stephen (1987). "Balinese Religion". In Eliade, Mircea (ed.). The Encyclopedia of Religion. Vol. 2. New York: MacMillan. pp. 45–49. ISBN 978-0-02-909480-8.
- Leo, Suryadinata (2014). "State and "Chinese Religions" in Indonesia: Confucianism, Tridharma and Buddhism during the Suharto Rule and After". In Chee-Beng Tan (ed.). After Migration and Religious Affiliation: Religions, Chinese Identities and Transnational Networks. Singapore: World Scientific. pp. 19–42.
- Levenda, Peter (2011). Tantric Temples: Eros and Magic in Java. Newburyport, MA: Ibis Press/Nicolas-Hays. ISBN 978-0-89254-169-0.
- Lidde, R. William (1996). "The Islamic Turn in Indonesia: A Political Explanation". Journal of Asian Studies. 55 (3): 613–34. doi:10.2307/2646448. JSTOR 2646448. S2CID 155053697.
- Lindsey, Tim; Pausacker, Helen, eds. (1995). Religion, Law and Intolerance in Indonesia. London; New York: Routledge. ISBN 978-0-7914-2025-6.
- Mansurnoor, Iik Arifin (2012). Living Islamically in the Periphery: Muslim Discourse, Institution, and Intellectual Tradition in Southeast Asia. Tangerang Selatan: UIN Jakarta.
- Maria, Siti; Limbeng, Julianus (2007). Marapu di Pulau Sumba, Provinsi Nusa Tenggara Timur (PDF). Seri pengungkapan nilai-nilai kepercayaan komunitas adat. Jakarta: Departemen Kebudayaan dan Pariwisata; Direktorat Jenderal Nilai Budaya, Seni dan Film; Direktorat Kepercayaan Terhadap Tuhan Yang Maha Esa.
- Marshall, Paul (2018). "The Ambiguities of Religious Freedom in Indonesia". The Review of Faith & International Affairs. 16 (1): 85–96. doi:10.1080/15570274.2018.1433588.
- Matthes, Benjamin F. (1872). Over de bissoe's of heidensche priesters en priesteessen der Boeginezen [On the Bissu, Buginese Pagan Priests] (in Dutch). Amsterdam.
- McCoy, Mary E. (2020). "Piety, Purity, and Nationalism: The Convergence of Nation and Islam in Contemporary Indonesia". In Verma, Vidhu; Rathore, Aakash Singh (eds.). Secularism, Religion, and Democracy in Southeast Asia. Oxford: Oxford University Press. pp. 161–193. ISBN 978-0-19-909877-4.
- McDaniel, June (2010). "Agama Hindu Dharma Indonesia as a New Religious Movement: Hinduism Recreated in the Image of Islam". Nova Religio: The Journal of Alternative and Emergent Religions. 14 (1): 93–111. doi:10.1525/nr.2010.14.1.93.
- Mehden, Fred R. von der (1995). "Indonesia". In Esposito, John L. (ed.). The Oxford Encyclopedia of the Modern Islamic World: 4-volume Set. Vol. 2. New York; Oxford: Oxford University Press. ISBN 978-0-19-506613-5.
- Melton, J. Gordon; Baumann, Martin, eds. (2010). "Indonesia". Religions of the world: a comprehensive encyclopedia of beliefs and practices. Vol. 4 (2nd ed.). Santa Barbara, Ca; Denver; Oxford: ABC-CLIO. ISBN 978-1-59884-203-6.
- Metcalf, Peter (1987). "Bornean Religion". In Eliade, Mircea (ed.). The Encyclopedia of Religion. Vol. 2. New York: MacMillan. pp. 290–92. ISBN 978-0-02-909480-8.
- Muhaimin, Abdul Ghoffir (2006). The Islamic Traditions of Cirebon: Ibadat and Adat Among Javanese Muslims. Canberra: ANU E Press. ISBN 978-1-920942-30-4. JSTOR j.ctt2jbkqk.
- Mulder, Niels (1998). Mysticism in Java: Ideology in Indonesia. Amsterdam: Pepin Press. ISBN 978-9054960478. Archived from the original on 6 May 2020.
- Mutalib, Hussin (2008). "Chap. 2. Indonesia". Islam in Southeast Asia. Southeast Asia Background Series, 11. Singapore: ISEAS–Yusof Ishak Institute. pp. 13–24. ISBN 978-981-230-759-0.
- Nash, Manning (1991). "Islamic Resurgence in Malaysia and Indonesia". In Marty, Martin E.; Appleby, R. Scott (eds.). Fundamentalisms Observed. The Fundamentalism Project, 1. Chicago, Il; London: University of Chicago Press. pp. 691–739. ISBN 0-226-50878-1.
- Nasution, Harun; et al., eds. (1992). Ensiklopedi Islam Indonesia [Encyclopedia of Indonesian Islam] (in Indonesian). Complited by team of the IAIN Syarif Hidayatullah. Jakarta: Djambatan. ISBN 979-428-134-4.
- Noer, Deliar (March 2013). "The Modernist Muslim Movement in Indonesia, 1900–1942" (PDF). American Journal of Sociology. 118 (5): 1467–1473. doi:10.1086/670524.
- Nooy-Palm, Hetty (1979). The Sa'dan-Toraja: A study of their social life and religion. I: Organization, symbols and beliefs (PDF). The Hague: Martinus Nijhoff. ISBN 978-90-247-2274-7. Archived (PDF) from the original on 12 February 2016.
- ——— (1986). The Sa'dan-Toraja: A study of their social life and religion. II: Rituals of the East and West. Leiden; Boston: BRILL. ISBN 978-90-67-65207-0.
- ——— (1987). "Toraja Religion". In Eliade, Mircea (ed.). The Encyclopedia of Religion. Vol. 14. New York: MacMillan. pp. 565–67. ISBN 978-0-02-909480-8.
- Peacock, James L. (1978). Muslim Puritans: Reformist Psychology in Southeast Asian Islam. Berkeley and Los Angeles, Ca: University of California Press. ISBN 0-520-03403-1.
- Pedersen, Lene (2006). Ritual and World Change in a Balinese Princedom. Durham: Carolina Academic Press. ISBN 978-1-59460-022-7.
- Pelras, Christian (1987). "Bugis Religion". In Eliade, Mircea (ed.). The Encyclopedia of Religion. Vol. 2. New York: MacMillan. pp. 560–61. ISBN 978-0-02-909480-8.
- Picard, Michel; Madinier, Rémy, eds. (2011). The Politics of Religion in Indonesia: Syncretism, Orthodoxy, and Religious Contention in Java and Bali. London; New York: Routledge. ISBN 978-979-709-472-0.
- Popov, Igor (2017). Buku rujukan semua aliran dan perkumpulan agama di Indonesia [The Reference Book on All Religious Branches and Communities in Indonesia] (in Indonesian). Singaraja: Toko Buku Indra Jaya.
- Putten, Jan van der; Cody, Mary Kilcline, eds. (2009). Lost Times and Untold Tales from the Malay World. Singapore: NUS Press. ISBN 978-9971-69-454-8.
- Pringle, Robert (2010). Understanding Islam in Indonesia: Politics and Diversity. Singapore: Editions Didier Millet. ISBN 978-981-4260-09-1.
- Rahman, Fatima Zainab (2014). "State restrictions on the Ahmadiyya sect in Indonesia and Pakistan: Islam or political survival?". Australian Journal of Political Science. 49 (3): 408–22. doi:10.1080/10361146.2014.934656. S2CID 153384157.
- Ramstedt, Martin, ed. (2004). Hinduism in Modern Indonesia: A minority religion between local, national, and global interest. London; New York: RoutledgeCurzon. ISBN 978-0-7007-1533-6.
- Ricklefs, Merle Calvin (2006). Mystic synthesis in Java: A history of Islamisation from the fourteenth to the early nineteenth centuries. White Plains, NY: EastBridge. ISBN 978-1-891936-61-6.
- ——— (2007). Polarising Javanese society: Islamic and other visions c. 1830–1930. Singapore; Leiden; Honolulu: NUS Press; KITLV Press; University of Hawai’i Press. ISBN 978-9971-69-346-6.
- ——— (2012). Islamisation and its opponents in Java: A political, social, cultural and religious history, c. 1930 to the Present. Singapore; Honolulu: NUS Press; University of Hawai’i Press. doi:10.2307/j.ctv1qv3fh. ISBN 978-9971-69-631-3. JSTOR j.ctv1qv3fh. S2CID 141544770.
- Riddel, Peter G. (2001). Islam and the Malay-Indonesian World: Transmission and Responses. Honolulu: University of Hawai'i Press. ISBN 0-8248-2473-3.
- Rodgers, Susan (1981). Adat, Islam, and Christianity in a Batak Homeland. Athens, Ohio: Ohio University. ISBN 978-0-89680-110-3.
- ——— (1987). "Batak Religion". In Eliade, Mircea (ed.). The Encyclopedia of Religion. Vol. 2. New York: MacMillan. pp. 81–83. ISBN 978-0-02-909480-8.
- Ropi, Ismatu (2017). Religion and Regulation in Indonesia. Singapore: Palgrave Macmillan. ISBN 978-981-10-2826-7.
- Rousseau, Jérôme (1998). Kayan Religion: Ritual Life and Religious Reform in Central Borneo. Leiden: KITLV Press. ISBN 978-9067181327.
- Sai, Siew-Min; Hoon, Chang-Yau, eds. (2013). Chinese Indonesians Peassessed. History, Religion and Belonging. London; New York: Routledge.
- Saleh, Fauzan (2001). Modern Trends in Islamic Theological Discourse in 20th Century Indonesia: A Critical Survey. Social, economic, and political studies of the Middle East, 79. Leiden: Brill. ISBN 90-04-12305-9.
- Sandkühler, Evamaria (2014). "Popularisation of Religious Traditions in Indonesia — Historical Communication of a Chinese Indonesian Place of Worship". In Schlehe, Judith; Sandkühler, Evamaria (eds.). Religion, Tradition and the Popular. Transcultural Views from Asia and Europe. Bielefeld: transcript. pp. 157–84. ISBN 978-3-8376-2613-1.
- Santosa, Revianto Budi; et al. (2025). Ensiklopedia Arsitektur Islam Indonesia. Edisi: Masjid Bersejarah [Encyclopedia of Indonesian Islamic Architecture. Edition: Historic Mosques] (in Indonesian). Jakarta: Kementerian Agama RI. ISBN 978-602-293-252-9.
- Saran, Syam, ed. (2018). Cultural and Civilisational Links between India and Southeast Asia: Historical and Contemporary Dimensions. Singapore: Palgrave Macmillan. ISBN 978-981-10-7316-8.
- Saringendyanti, Etty; Herlina, Nina; Zakaria, Mumuh Muhsin (2018). "Tri Tangtu on Sunda Wiwitan Doctrine in the XIV–XVII Century". Tawarikh: Journal of Historical Studies. 10 (1). Bandung: 1–14. ISSN 2085-0980.
- Schärer, Hans (1963) [1946]. Ngaju Religion: The Conception of God among a South Borneo People. The Hague: Martinus Nijhoff. ISBN 978-90-04-24799-4.
- Schefold, Reimar (1980). Spielzeug für die Seelen — Kunst und Kultur der Mentawai-Inseln (Indonesien) [Toys for the Souls: Art and Culture of the Mentawai (Indonesia)] (in German). Zürich: Museum Rietberg.
- ——— (1988). "De wildernis als cultuur van gene ziijde: tribale concepten van "natuur" in Indonesiο" [The wilderness as a culture of the past: tribal concepts of "nature" in Indonesia]. Antropologische Verkenningen (in Dutch). 7 (4): 5–22.
- Schiller, Anne (1996). Schieman, Scott (ed.). "An "Old" Religion in "New Order" Indonesia: Notes on Ethnicity and Religious Affiliation". Sociology of Religion. 57 (4). Oxford University Press: 409–17. doi:10.2307/3711895. ISSN 1759-8818. JSTOR 3711895. OCLC 728290653.
- Schlehe, Judith (1998). Die Meereskönigin des Südens, Ratu Kidul. Geisterpolitik im javanischen Alltag [The Queen of the Southern Sea, Ratu Kidul. Politics of Spirits in Javanese Everyday Life] (in German). Berlin: Dietrich Reimer. ISBN 3-496-02657-X.
- ——— (2014). "Translating Traditions and Transcendence: Popularised Religiosity and the Paranormal Practitioners' Position in Indonesia". In Schlehe, Judith; Sandkühler, Evamaria (eds.). Religion, Tradition and the Popular. Transcultural Views from Asia and Europe. Bielefeld: transcript. pp. 185–201. ISBN 978-3-8376-2613-1.
- ——— (2019). "Cosmopolitanism, Pluralism and Self-Orientalisation in the Modern Mystical World of Java". Asian Journal of Social Science. 47 (3): 364–86. doi:10.1163/15685314-04703005. S2CID 203066359.
- Schröter, Susanne, ed. (2010). "The Indigenization of Catholicism on Flores" (PDF). Christianity in Indonesia (Southeast Asian modernities, vol. 12). Berlin / Münster: LIT Verlag. pp. 90–105. ISBN 9783643107985.
- Segara, I Nyoman Yoga (2023). "The Future of Hindu Alukta in Tana Toraja Post-Integration With the Hindu Religion". Heritage of Nusantara. 12 (2): 217–259. doi:10.31291/hn.v12i2.710.
- Seo, Myengkyo (2013). State Management of Religion in Indonesia. London; New York: Routledge. ISBN 978-0-415-51716-4.
- Shah, Dian A. H. (2017). Constitutions, Religion and Politics in Asia: Indonesia, Malaysia and Sri Lanka. Cambridge: Cambridge University Press. ISBN 978-1-107-18334-6.
- Shiraishi, Takashi (1990). "Dangir's Testimony: Saminism Reconstructed". Indonesia. 50: 95–122. doi:10.2307/3351232. hdl:1813/53945. JSTOR 3351232.
- Sidel, John T. (2006). Riots, Pogroms, Jihad: Religious Violence in Indonesia. Ithaca, NY: Cornell University Press. ISBN 978-0-8014-7327-2.
- Sievers, A. (1974). The Mystical World of Indonesia. Baltimore; London: Johns Hopkins University Press. ASIN B000Q1LA8E.
- Smith, Rita Kipp; Rodgers, Susan, eds. (1987). Indonesian Religions in Transition. Tucson: University of Arizona Press.
- Solahudin (2013) [2011]. The Roots of Terrorism in Indonesia: From Darul Islam to Jema'ah Islamiyah [NII Sampai JI: Salafy Jihadisme di Indonesia]. Ithaca, NY: Cornell University Press. ISBN 978-0-8014-7938-0.
- Stange, Paul (1980). The Sumarah movement in Javanese mysticism. Thesis (Ph.D.) University of Wisconsin-Madison (PDF). Archived from the original on 6 February 2011.
- Steenbrink, Karel (2003). Catholics in Indonesia: A documented history 1808–1942. Vol. 1: A modest recovery 1808–1903. Leiden: KITLV Press. ISBN 978-90-6718-141-9.
- ——— (2007). Catholics in Indonesia: A documented history 1808–1942. Vol. 2: The Spectacular Growth of a Self Confident Minority, 1903–1942. Leiden: KITLV Press. ISBN 978-90-6718-260-7.
- ——— (2015). Catholics in Independent Indonesia: 1945–2010. Leiden; Boston: BRILL. ISBN 978-90-04-28513-2.
- Stuart-Fox, David J. (2002). Pura Besakih: Temple, religion and society in Bali. Leiden: KITLV Press. ISBN 978-9067181464.
- Sukamto (2018). Perjumpaan Antarpemeluk Agama di Nusantara: Masa Hindu-Buddha Sampai Sebelum Masuknya Portugis (in Indonesian). Yogyakarta: Deepublish. ISBN 978-602-475-476-1.
- Suparyanto, Petrus (2019). Bhīma's Mistical Quest: As a Model of Javanese Spiritual Growth. Wien: LIT Verlag. ISBN 978-3-643-90883-4.
- Swellengrebel, J. L., ed. (1960). Bali: Studies in Life, Thought, and Ritual. The Hague: W. van Hoeve. ASIN B00ET0VF56Selected studies on Bali by Dutch scholars
- Swellengrebel, J. L., ed. (1969). Bali: Further Studies in Life, Thought, and Ritual. The Hague: W. van Hoeve. ASIN B0010P1VU2Selected studies on Bali by Dutch scholars
- Syryadinata, Leo (2005). "Buddhism and Confucianism in Contemporary Indonesia: Recent Developments". In Lindsey, Tim; Pausacker, Helen (eds.). Chinese Indonesians: Remembering, Distorting, Forgetting. Singapore: ISEAS: Institute of Southeast Asian Studies. pp. 77–94. ISBN 978-981-230-303-5.
- Turmudi, Endang (2006). Struggling for the Umma: Changing Leadership Roles of Kiai in Jombang, East Java. Islam in Southeast Asia Series. Canberra: ANU E Press. ISBN 1-920942-42-4. JSTOR j.ctt2jbk2d.
- Volkman, Toby Alice (1985). Feasts of Honor: Ritual and Change in the Toraja Highlands. Urbana: University of Illinois Press.
- Weinstock, Joseph (1983). Kaharingan and the Luangan Dayaks: Religion and Identity in Central East Borneo. Thesis (Ph.D.) Cornell University.
- Weiyi, Lin 林緯毅 (Ning Ngoi Ngi), ed. (2010). Bie qi wei zong: Dongnanya de ruxue yu kongjiao 別起為宗: 東南亞的儒學與孔教 [Establishing a Separate Branch of Transmission: Confucian Learning and the Confucian Religious Sect in Southeast Asia] (in Chinese). Singapore: Singapore Society of Asian Studies.
- Winzeler, Robert L., ed. (1993). The Seen and the Unseen: Shamanism, Mediumship and Possession in Borneo. Williamsburg, Va.: Borneo Research Council. ISBN 978-0-9629568-1-2.
- Wiryomartono, Bagoes (2023). Historical Mosques in Indonesia and Malaysia World: Roots, Transformations, and Developments (PDF). Singapore: Springer. ISBN 978-981-99-3805-6.
- Woodward, Mark (1989). Islam in Java: Normative Piety and Misticism in the Sultanate of Yogyakarta. Tucson, Ar: University of Arizona Press.
- ——— (2011). Java, Indonesia and Islam. Dordrecht: Springer.
- Yang, Heriyanto (2005). "The History and Legal Position of Confucianism in Post Independence Indonesia" (PDF). Marburg Journal of Religion. 10 (1).
- Yusuf, Kamal; Putrie, Yulia Eka (September 2022). "The Linguistic Landscape of Mosques in Indonesia: Materiality and Identity Representation". International Journal of Society, Culture & Language. 10 (3): 1–20. doi:10.22034/ijscl.2022.550006.2570.
- Zulkifli (2011). The struggle of Shi'is in Indonesia. Islam in Southeast Asia Series. Canberra: ANU E Press. ISBN 978-1-925021-29-5.
