= Western Indonesia =

Main geographical region of Indonesia

Western Indonesia Indonesia Barat
- Region
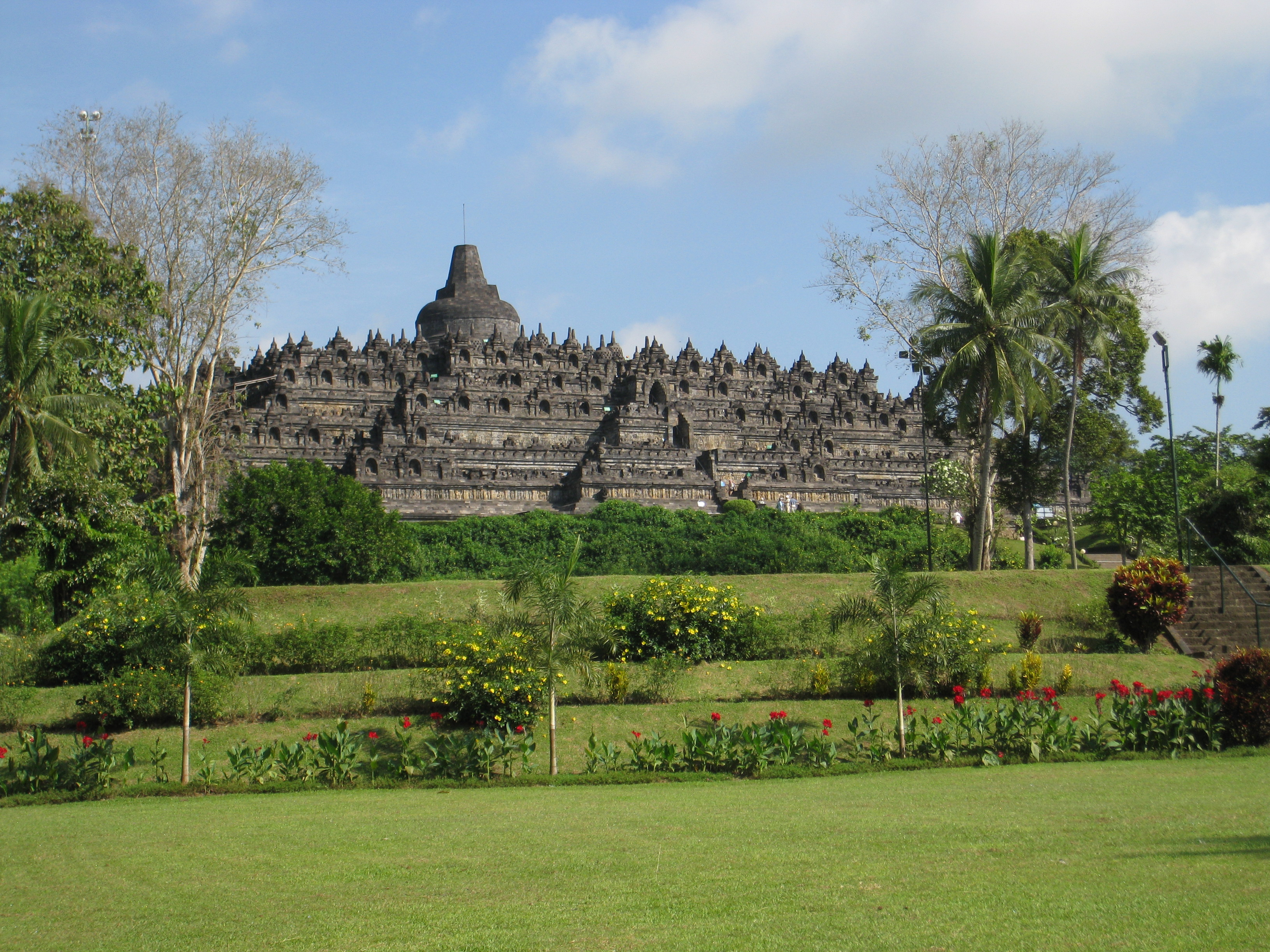
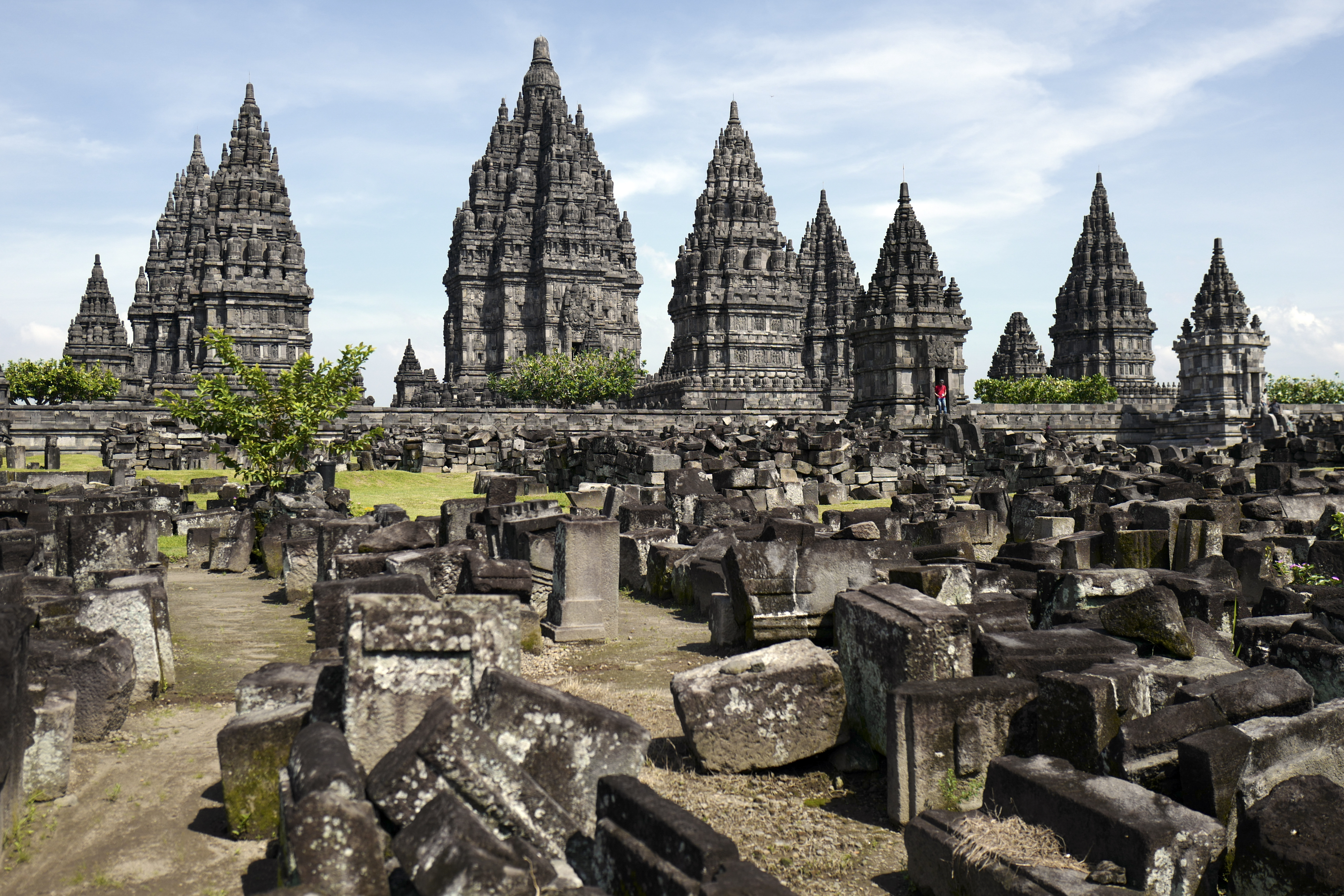
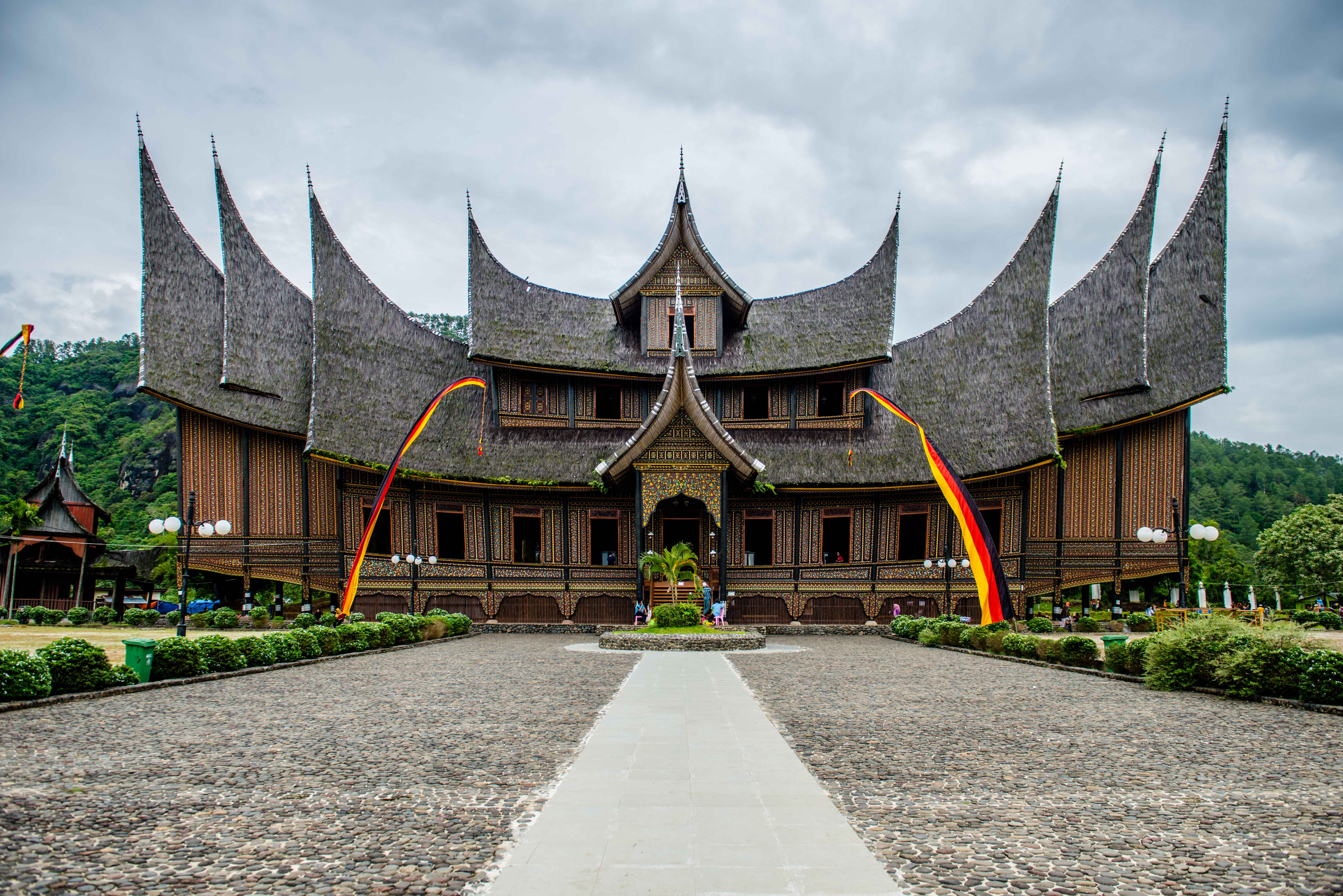
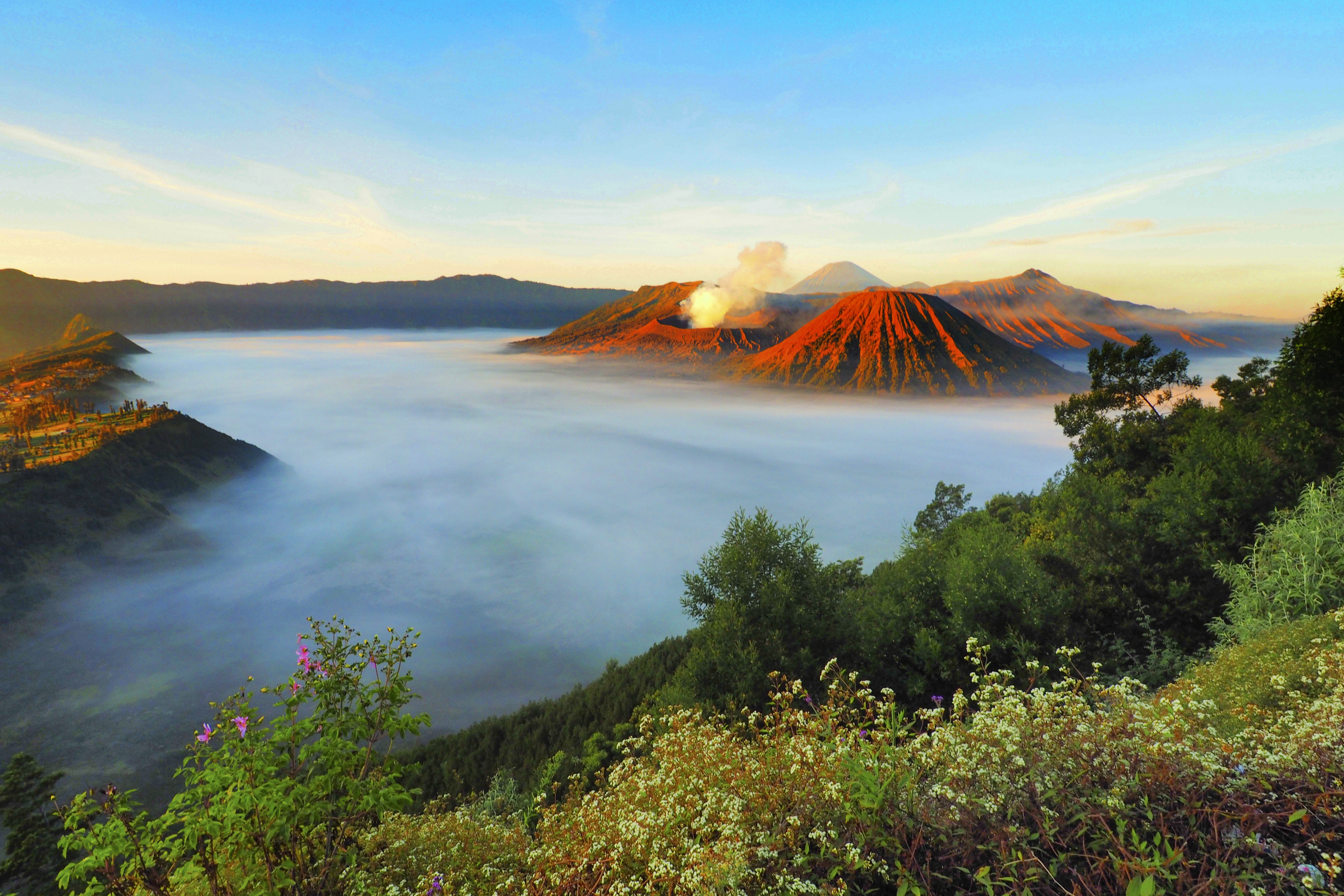
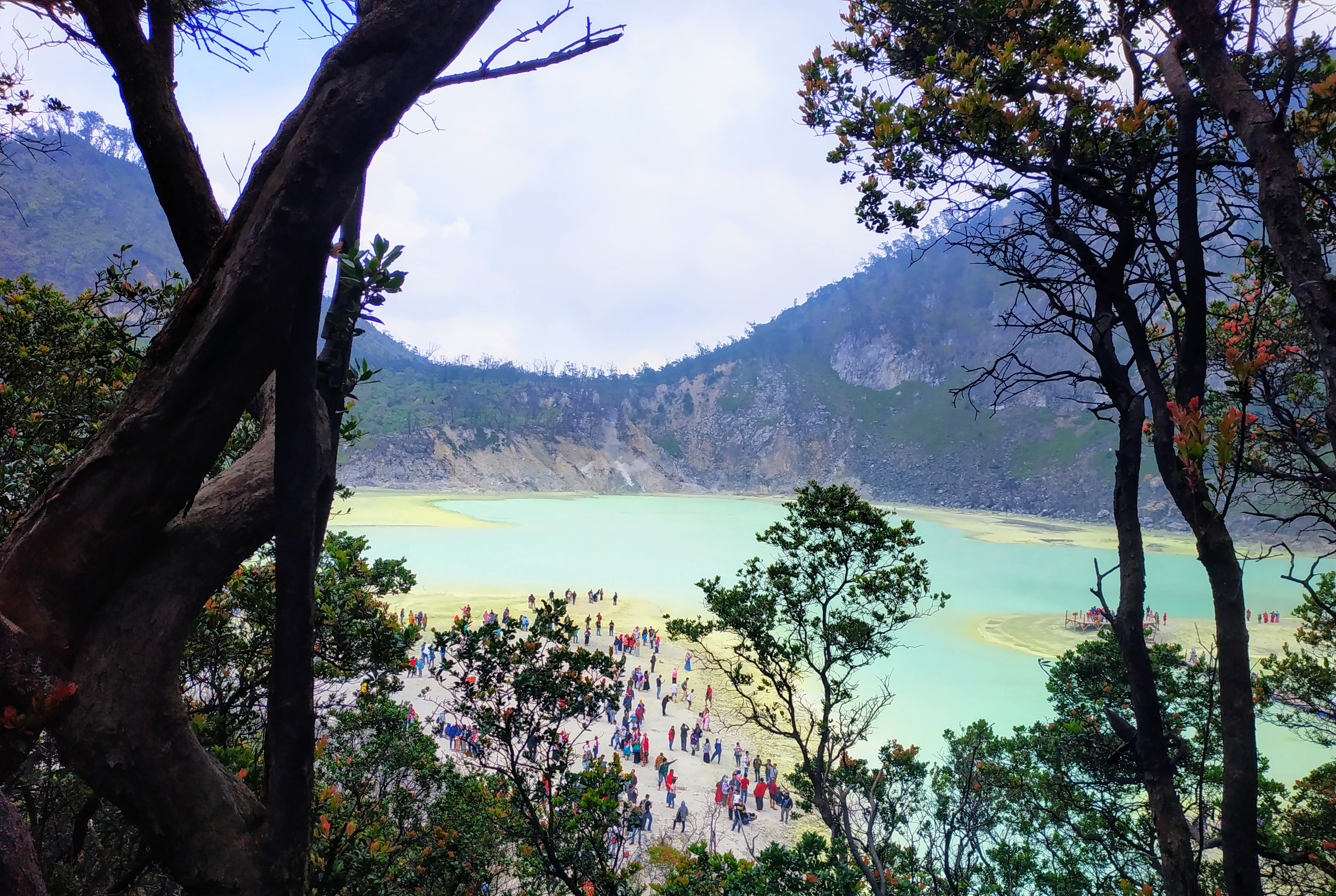
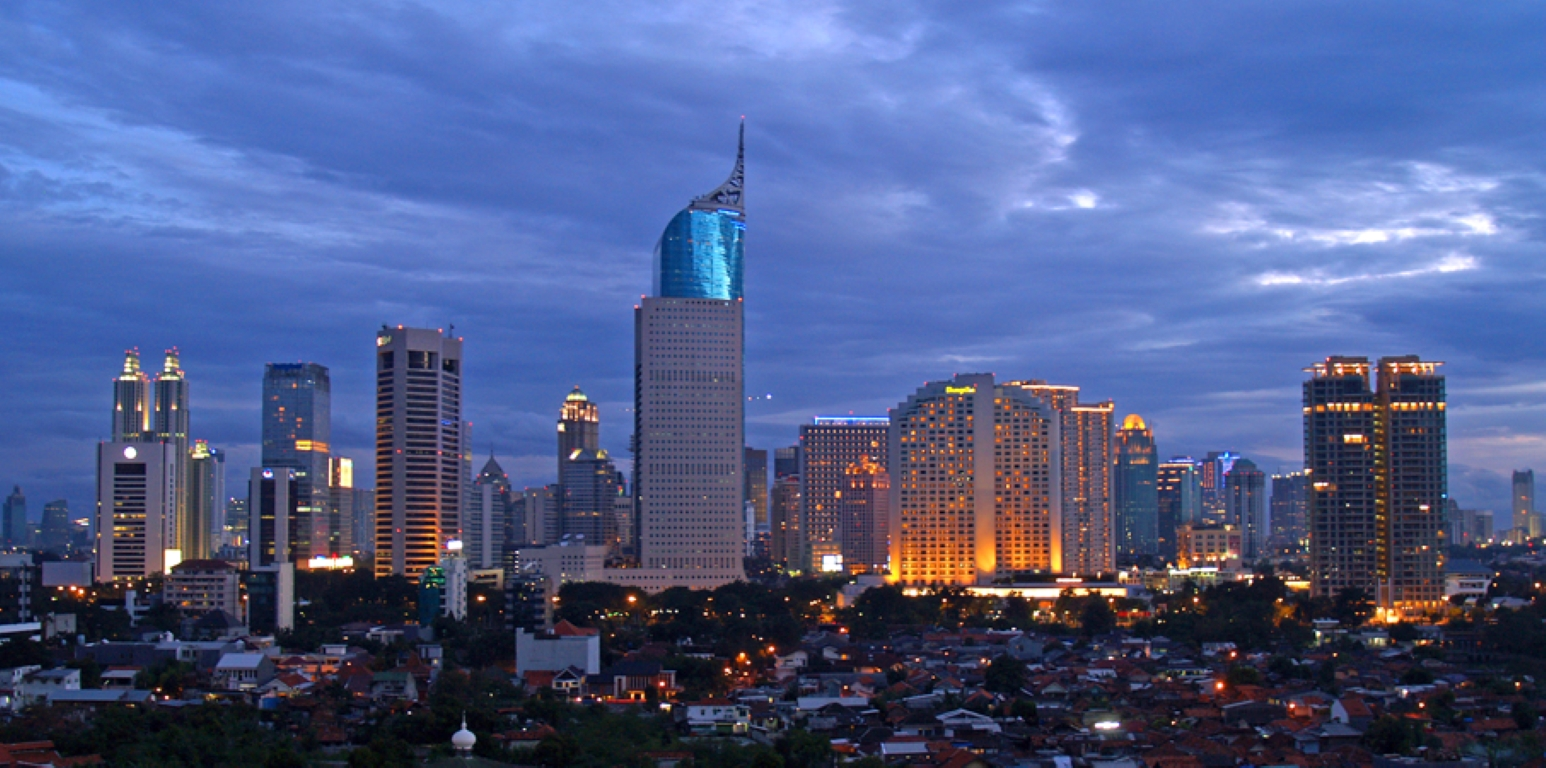
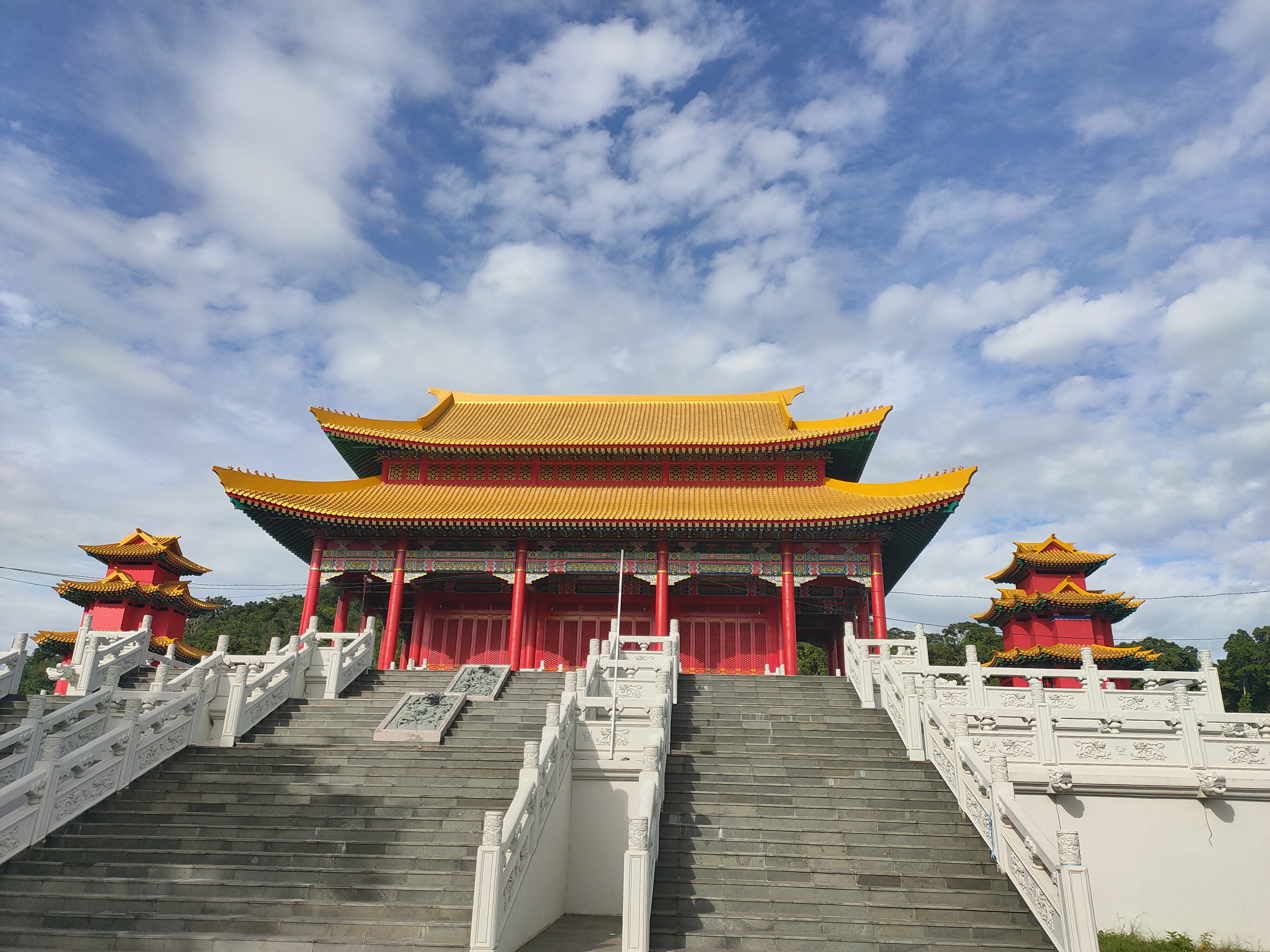
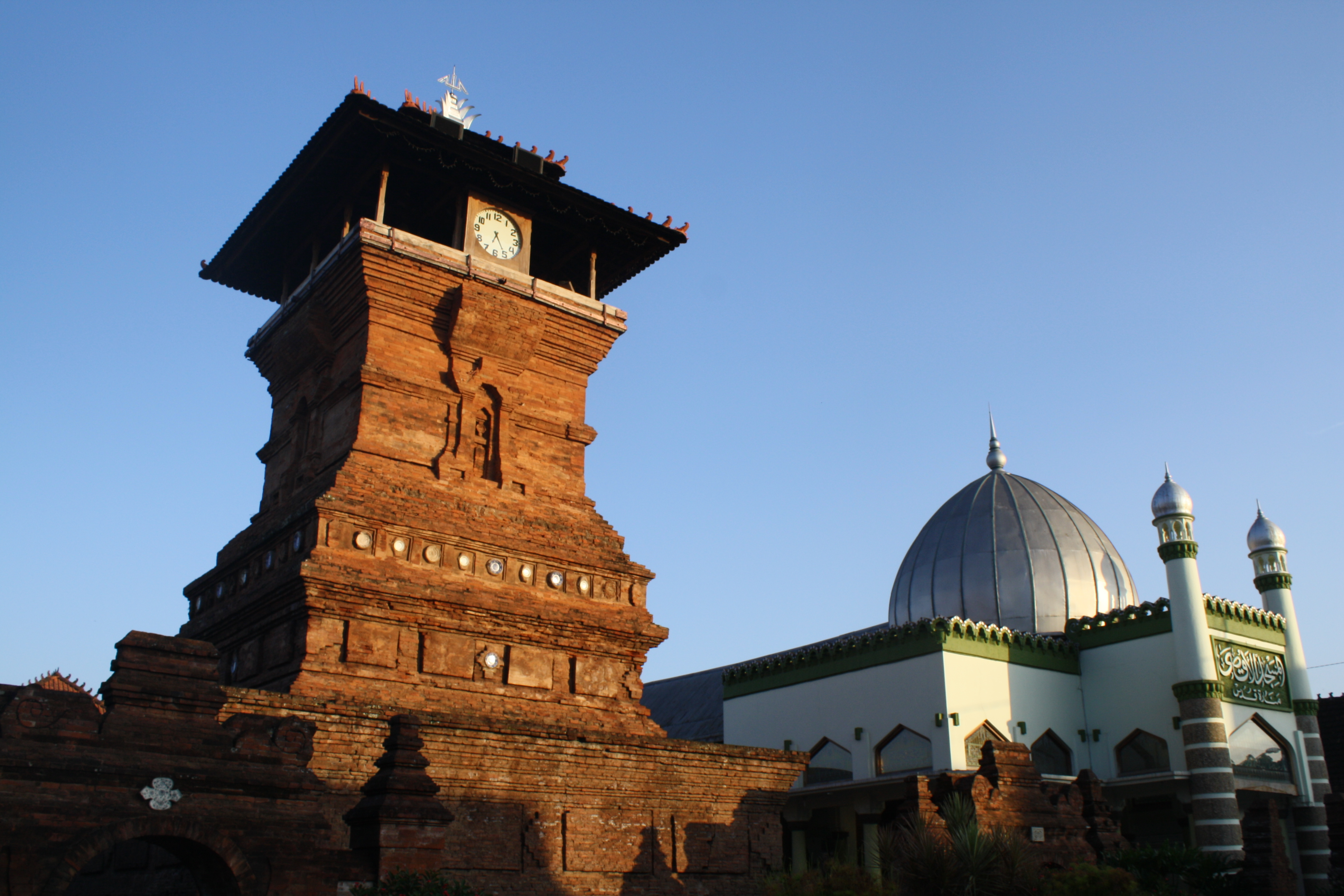
- Top-down, left-to-right: Borobudur, Prambanan, Pagaruyung Palace, Mount Bromo, Kawah Putih, Jakarta skyline, Thai Pak Kung Temple, Menara Kudus Mosque

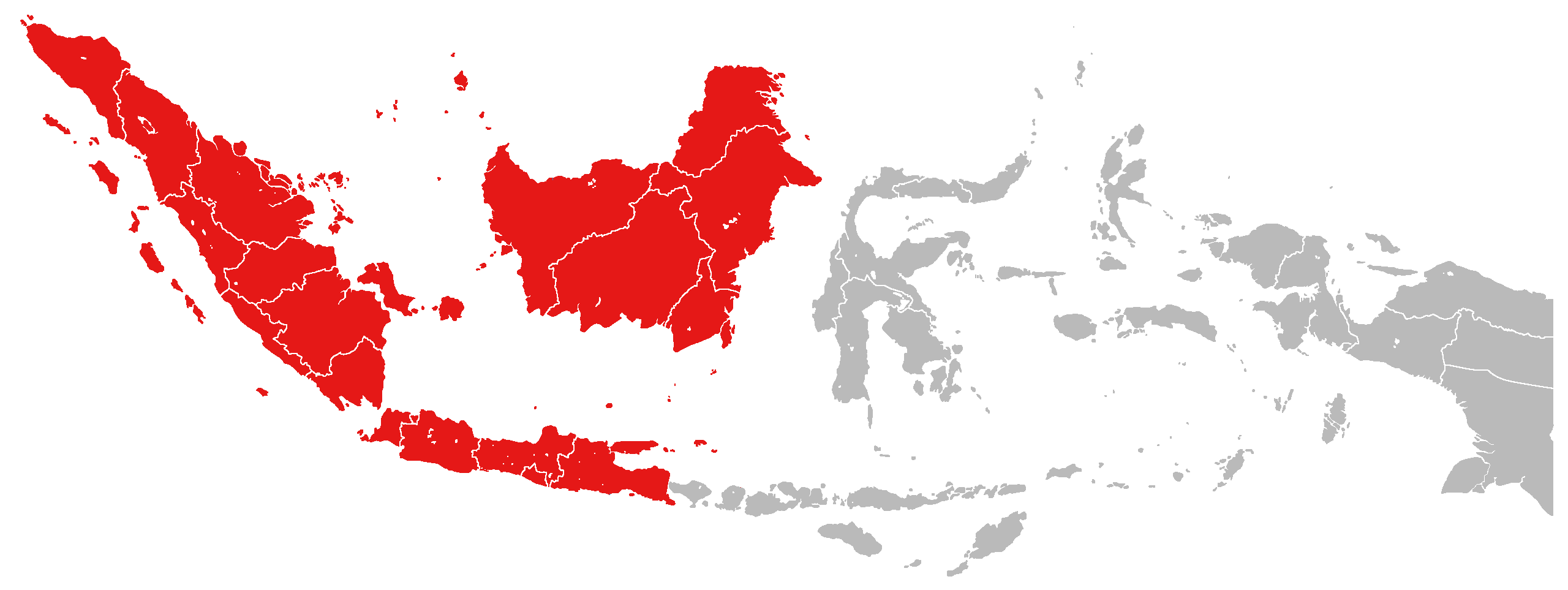
- Country: Indonesia
- Provinces: Aceh; North Sumatra; West Sumatra; Riau; Riau Islands; Jambi; Bengkulu; South Sumatra; Bangka Belitung Islands; Lampung; Banten; Jakarta; West Java; Central Java; Special Region of Yogyakarta; East Java; West Kalimantan; Central Kalimantan; South Kalimantan; East Kalimantan; North Kalimantan
- Largest city: Jakarta
- Other major cities: Surabaya; Bekasi; Bandung; Medan; Tangerang; Palembang; Semarang; Batam; Bandar Lampung; Pekanbaru; Padang; Samarinda; Serang; Balikpapan; Banjarmasin; Pontianak; Jambi; Bengkulu; Yogyakarta; Palangka Raya; Banjarbaru; Banda Aceh; Tarakan; Tanjungpinang; Pangkalpinang

Area
  - Total: 854,164 sq mi (2,212,274 km^{2})
  - Land: 236,400 sq mi (612,274 km^{2})
  - Water: 620,000 sq mi (1,600,000 km^{2})

Population (2022)
  - Total: 230,563,678
  - Density: 975.310/sq mi (376.569/km^{2})
- Demonym: Western Indonesians
- Time zones: UTC+07:00 (Western Indonesia Time)
- UTC+08:00 (Central Indonesia Time)
- Official language: Indonesian
- Other regional languages: Javanese; Sundanese; Malay; Madurese; Batak; Minangkabau; Dayak; Banjarese; Acehnese etc.

Western Indonesia (Indonesian: Indonesia Barat; pronounced [ɪndoˌnes(i)ja ˈbarat̪̚]) is one of the two main geographical regions of Indonesia, the other being Eastern Indonesia. It consists of 21 provinces in Java, Kalimantan, and Sumatra. Western Indonesia Time (Indonesian: Waktu Indonesia Barat, WIB; pronounced [ˌwak̚t̪u ɪndoˌnes(i)ja ˈbarat̪̚]) is seven hours ahead (UTC+07:00) of the Coordinated Universal Time (UTC), used in the islands of Sumatra, Java, and the western half of Kalimantan.

Western Indonesia has a land border with East Malaysia to the North and Peninsular Malaysia to the West.

== History ==
Military action by the Dutch launched on 20 July 1947 against areas controlled by the Indonesian republicans, Operation Product, resulted in the Dutch regaining control of West and East Java, the areas around Medan, Palembang and Padang in Sumatra. The United Nations called for a ceasefire, and negotiations between the two sides led to the Renville Agreement of January 1948, with a ceasefire along the "Van Mook Line", which connected the most advanced Dutch positions. The Dutch then established states in the areas they had reoccupied, including East Sumatra (December 1947), Madura and West Java (February 1948), South Sumatra (September 1948) and East Java (November 1948). The leaders of these regions then established the Federal Consultative Assembly.

A second Dutch military action, Operation Kraai, aimed at destroying the Republic, was launched on 18 December 1948. Despite recapturing the major cities of Java, including the republican capital of Yogyakarta, and all of Sumatra except Aceh in the far north, it triggered the protest resignation of the cabinets of the State of East Indonesia and Pasundan (West Java) and the Sultan of Yogyakarta from his position as regional head.

== Geography ==
=== Geology ===
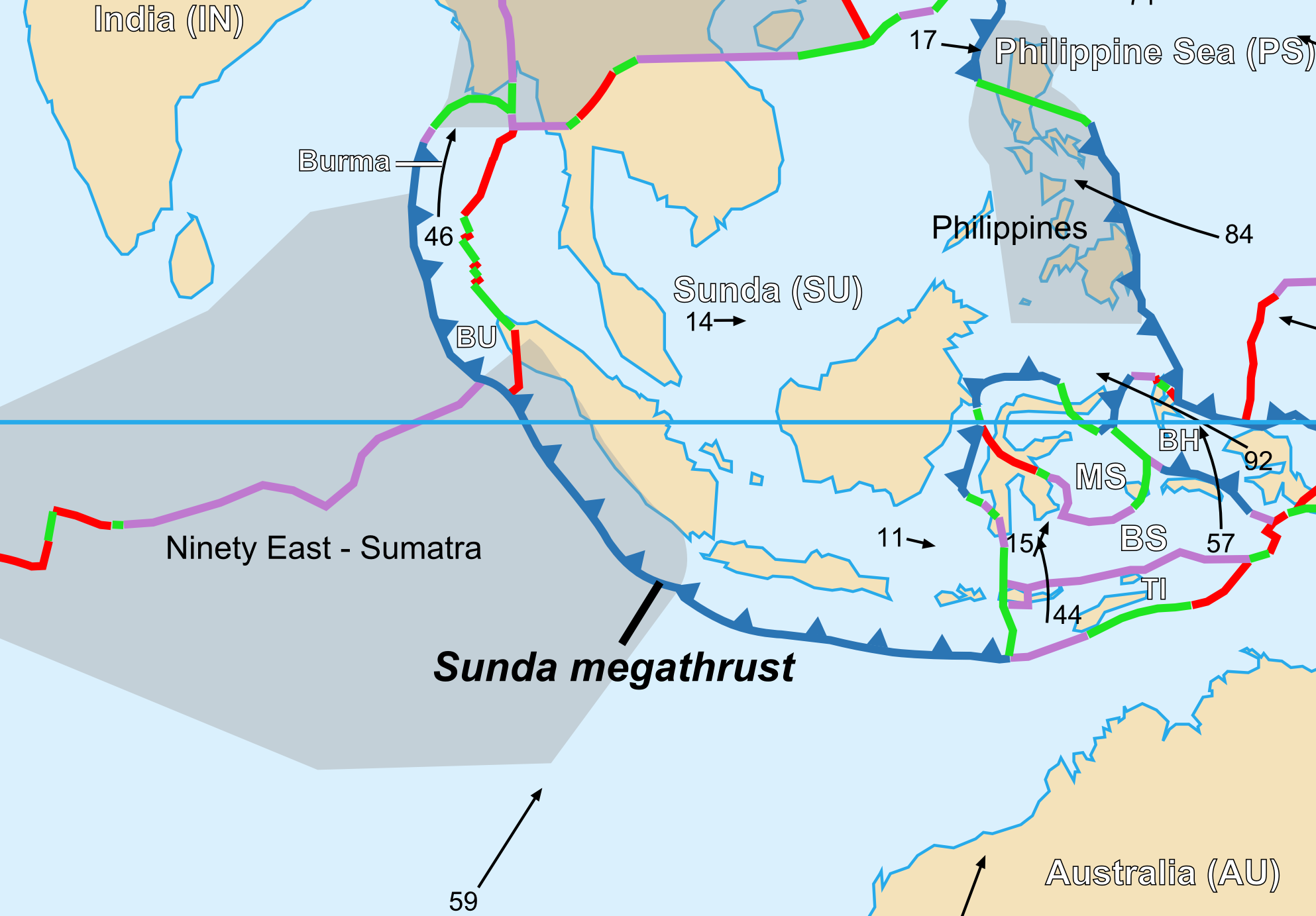
The tectonic plates & movements under Indonesia

The main islands of Sumatra, Java, Madura, and Kalimantan lie on the Sunda plate. Indonesia has relatively high tectonic and volcanic activities. It lies on the convergence between the Eurasian, Indo-Australian, Pacific, and Philippine Sea plate. The Sunda megathrust is a 5,500 km long fault located off southern coasts of Sumatra, Java and Lesser Sunda Islands, where the Indo-Australian plate is thrusting northeastward towards the subducting Sunda plate. Tectonic movement in this fault is responsible for the creation of the Sunda Trench, and mountain ranges across Sumatra, Java. Mount Merapi, located in the Java portion of the megathrust, is the most active volcano in Indonesia and is designated as one of world's Decade Volcanoes due to the hazard it poses to the surrounding populated areas.

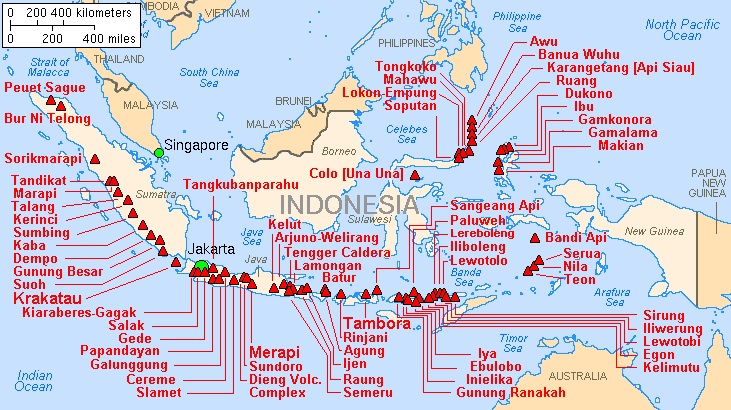
A map of Indonesia's volcanoes.

=== Ecology ===
Borneo is the third largest island in the world and the native vegetation was mostly Borneo lowland rain forests although much of this has been cleared with wildlife retreating to the Borneo montane rain forests inland. Kalimantan and Sumatra, experience only slight differences in rainfall and temperature between the seasons, whereas others, such as Nusa Tenggara, experience far more pronounced differences with droughts in the dry season, and floods in the wet. Rainfall in Indonesia is plentiful, particularly in West Sumatra, Northwest Kalimantan, West Java.

== Administration ==
Western Indonesia is composed of three main geographic units: Kalimantan, Java and Sumatra.

Code	Geographical unit	Provinces	Population (mid-2023)	Largest city	Highest point
ID-SM	Sumatra	Aceh, the Bangka Belitung Islands, Bengkulu, Jambi, Lampung, North Sumatra, Riau, the Riau Islands, South Sumatra, and West Sumatra	60,756,400	Medan	Mount Kerinci; 3,805 m (12484 ft)
ID-JW	Java	Banten, Central Java, East Java, the Special Capital Region of Jakarta, the Special Region of Yogyakarta, and West Java	155,645,500	Jakarta	Mount Semeru; 3,678 m (12067 ft)
ID-KA	Kalimantan	Central Kalimantan, East Kalimantan, North Kalimantan, South Kalimantan, and West Kalimantan	17,259,000	Samarinda	Mount Bukit Raya; 2,278 m (7,474 ft)

== Economy ==
Below are the top 13 provinces in Western Indonesia ranked by GDP in 2019:

Rank	Province	Region	GDP (in billion Rp)	GDP nominal	GDP PPP
Rank	Province	Region	GDP (in billion Rp)	(in billion $)	(in billion $)
-	Indonesia	South East Asia	16,073,257	1,136.72	3,329.17
1	Jakarta	Java	2,840,828	200.91	588.42
2	East Java	Java	2,352,425	166.37	487.27
3	West Java	Java	2,125,158	150.30	440.19
4	Central Java	Java	1,362,457	96.35	282.18
5	North Sumatra	Sumatra	801,733	56.70	166.06
6	Riau	Sumatra	765,198	54.12	158.51
7	Banten	Java	664,963	47.03	137.74
8	East Kalimantan	Kalimantan	653,677	46.23	135.40
9	South Sumatra	Sumatra	455,233	32.19	94.28
10	Lampung	Sumatra	360,664	25.51	74,71
11	Riau Islands	Sumatra	268,080	18.96	55.53
12	West Sumatra	Sumatra	246,423	17.42	51.01
13	Jambi	Sumatra	217,712	15.40	45.10

In 2012, the DMO was 24.72%. Starting from 2014, no low-grade coal exports are allowed, so the upgraded brown coal process that cranks up the calorie value of coal from 4,500 to 6,100 kcal/kg will be built in South Kalimantan and South Sumatra. Major Japanese factories are concentrated east of Jakarta with high concentrations in Bekasi, Cikarang and Karawang, West Java.

== Demographics ==
=== Population ===
Jakarta is the largest city and the only megacity in Indonesia, with a population of 10.70 million. As a primate city, Jakarta is nearly four times larger than the second largest city Surabaya. Jakarta's status is unique compared to other cities in Indonesia, since it is technically a province with a city management. It is subdividied into five administrative cities and an administrative regency, which are not self-governed (without municipal council nor government budget). All five of Jakarta's satellite cities also have passed one million mark in population, with the largest one being Bekasi.

The other largest cities by region include Medan (Sumatra, also the largest outside of Java), Samarinda (Kalimantan).

Below are the populations of each provinces which make up the total population of Western Indonesia:

Province	Population (2010 census)	Urban % in 2010	Total Fertility Rate	Population (2015 census)
Aceh	4,494,410	23.6	2.79	4,496,570
North Sumatra	12,982,204	42.4	3.01	13,923,262
West Sumatra	4,846,909	29.0	2.91	5,190,577
Riau	5,538,367	43.7	2.82	6,330,941
Jambi	3,092,265	28.3	2.51	3,397,164
South Sumatra	7,450,394	34.4	2.56	8,043,042
Bengkulu	1,715,518	29.4	2.51	1,872,136
Lampung	7,608,405	21.0	2.45	8,109,601
Bangka Belitung Islands	1,223,296	43.0	2.54	1,370,331
Riau Islands	1,679,163	67.4	2.38	1,968,313
Banten	10,632,166	52.2	2.35	11,934,373
Jakarta	9,607,787	100.0	1.82	10,154,134
West Java	43,053,732	50.3	2.43	46,668,214
Central Java	32,382,657	40.4	2.20	33,753,023
Yogyakarta	3,457,491	57.7	1.94	3,675,768
East Java	37,476,757	40.9	2.00	38,828,061

=== Languages ===
The major ethno-linguistic groups within Indonesia

Indonesia recognizes only a single national language, and indigenous languages are recognized at the regional level, although policies vary from one region to another. For example, in the Special Region of Yogyakarta, the Javanese language is the region's official language along with Indonesian. The next most widely spoken regional languages in the country are Sundanese, local Malay, and Minangkabau. There are hundreds of indigenous languages spoken in Indonesia. Most of them are locally used indigenous languages, a category of languages referring to those spoken at the local, regional level, spoken by a small number of people, ranging from a few to a few thousands of people. These include small languages such as Benggoi, Mombum and Towei. Other languages are spoken at the regional level to connect various ethnicities. For this reason, these languages are known as regional lingua francas (RLFs). According to Subhan Zein, there are at least 43 RLFs in Indonesia, categorized into two types: Malayic RLFs and Non-Malayic RLFs. The former refers to a group of regional lingua francas that are thought of as indigenised varieties of Malay or Indonesian. These include such languages like Banjar Malay among others. The latter refers to regional lingua francas that are not associated with Malay or Indonesian, like Iban. (Note: Zein's definition of "Malayic" RLFs should not be confused with the genealogical Malayic subgroup of Malayo-Polynesian languages. The genealogical Malayic subgroup also includes languages that are listed by Zein as "non-Malayic" RLFs, such as Iban and Musi)

The population numbers given below are of native speakers, excepting the figure for Indonesian, which counts its total speakers.

Largest languages in Indonesia
Language	Number (millions)	% of total population	Branch	Year surveyed	Main areas where spoken
Indonesian	210	80.42	Malayic	2010	Throughout Indonesia
Javanese	84.3	32.28	Javanese	2000 (census)	Throughout Java Island and several provinces in Sumatra and Kalimantan islands.
Sundanese	42.0	16.08	Sundanese	2016	West Java, Banten, Jakarta
Madurese	13.6	5.21	Madurese	2000 (census)	Madura Island (East Java)
Minangkabau	5.5	2.11	Malayic	2007	West Sumatra, Riau, Jambi, Bengkulu, Jakarta
Palembang Malay	3.9	1.49	Malayic	2000 (census)	South Sumatra
Banjarese	3.5	1.34	Malayic	2000 (census)	South Kalimantan, East Kalimantan, Central Kalimantan
Acehnese	3.5	1.34	Chamic	2000 (census)	Aceh
Betawi	2.7	1.03	Malay-based creole	1993	Jakarta
Batak Toba	2.0	0.77	Northwest Sumatra–Barrier Islands	1991	North Sumatra, Riau, Riau Islands, Jakarta
Chinese-Min Nan	1.3	0.50	Sinitic (Min Nan)	2000	North Sumatra, Riau, Riau Islands, West Kalimantan
Batak Karo	0.6	0.23	Northwest Sumatra–Barrier Islands	1991	North Sumatra
Bangka Malay	0.3	0.11	Malayic	2000 (census)	Bangka Island (Bangka Belitung)
Osing	0.3	0.11	Javanese	2000 (census)	East Java
Gayo	0.3	0.11	Northwest Sumatra–Barrier Islands	2000 (census)	Aceh
Chinese-Cantonese	0.3	0.11	Sinitic (Yue)	2000	North Sumatra, Riau Islands, Jakarta

=== Religion ===
Religion was a census variable in the 1961, 1971, 1980, 1990, 2000, and 2010 and in various intercensal surveys. Being deemed divisive, the 1961 census data regarding religion was not published. In 1971, three groups of Christians were recorded: Catholic, Protestant and other. The U.N. Demographic Yearbook 1979 only lists data collectively for all Christians. In the 2000 census, only Catholics and Protestants were available as categories.

Religious composition by ethnic group

Ethnic Group	Muslims	Christians	Hindus	Buddhists	Confucians	Others	Total
Javanese	92,107,046	2,428,121	160,090	90,465	2,857	9,599	94,788,943
Sundanese	36,450,022	29,332	1,851	24,528	4,854	155,308	36,665,892
Malay	8,643,370	8,484	1,031	19,848	1,243	242	8,751,218
Batak	3,738,660	4,707,658	1,476	9,190	315	6,305	8,463,604
Madurese	7,157,518	7,695	368	435	32	43	7,166,091
Betawi	6,607,019	151,429	1,161	39,278	1,805	252	6,800,943
Minangkabau	6,441,071	1,822	179	1,255	49	44	6,459,420
Buginese	6,348,200	35,516	26,102	957	47	2,395	6,413,217
Bantenese	4,634,374	4,810	101	2,680	70	242	4,642,277
Banjarese	4,108,104	15,775	994	1,396	62	410	4,126,741
Balinese	127,274	49,385	3,736,993	10,378	142	473	3,924,645
Acehnese	3,398,818	403	70	1,028	7	4	3,403,961
Dayak	1,016,697	2,017,870	12,140	17,502	568	154,219	3,218,996
Sasak	3,153,671	5,540	4,555	10,682	7	439	3,174,894
Chinese	131,682	1,211,692	3,552	1,388,829	94,005	1,114	2,830,874

== See also ==
- Regions of Indonesia
- Eastern Indonesia
