= Enggano people =

Isolated but contacted tribe which inhabits Enggano Island

Enggano
E Lopeh
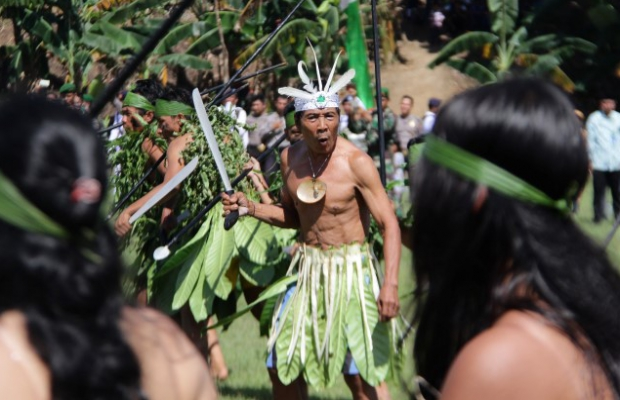
- An Enggano man performing a war dance.

Total population
- 1,500 (2000)

Regions with significant populations
- Indonesia (Enggano Island)

Languages
- Enggano language, Indonesian language

Religion
- Majority: Christianity (Predominantly Protestantism; Roman Catholicism); Minority: Folk religion (animism, totemism, ancestral worship) and Islam (Sunni)

Related ethnic groups
- Batak and Nias

The Enggano people are an isolated, but contacted, tribe which inhabits Enggano Island. Enggano Island is a small island located adjacent to the southwest coast of Sumatra in Indonesia. The population of Enggano people is not closely tracked. As such, no population estimates beyond the year 2000 appear to exist. Furthermore, the estimates from 1990 and 2000 are not in agreement. The source for the year 2000 estimates that there were 1,500 Enggano people inhabiting the island, while the 1999 source estimates that there were approximately 1,000 Enggano people inhabiting the island. However, both sources agree that the population is likely to continue decreasing.

The Enggano people are further divided into 5 tribes, namely Kauno, Kaitora, Kaarubi, Kaharuba, and Kaahoao, each of them are led by a tribal chief.

== Language ==
The Enggano language is generally classified as being part of the Northwest Sumatra–Barrier Islands subgroup of the Austronesian languages. However, its actual classification is controversial. Some suggest that it's its own primary branch of Malayo-Ploynesian - or even a language isolate.

Enggano is known for sharing few words with other Austronesian languages, having many unusual sound changes on those it does, and other irregularities between it and its relatives. Some features more closely resemble languages from Melanesia and Eastern Indonesia Austronesian languages than its own West Indonesian neighbours and relatives.

It is unclear whether its words and grammar derive from heavy internal changes, or that the language is actually an isolate that borrowed heavily from Austronesian.

Due to cultural and some linguistic similarities with the Nicobarese, there was a theory that it was Austroasiatic. However, this has been debunked.

== Origin and social structure ==
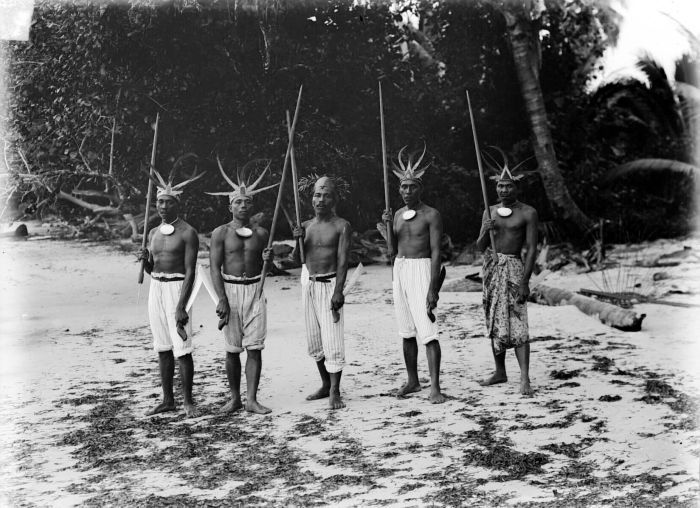
Enggano warriors in traditional war attire and Ekajo javelin from Bengkulu.

The Enggano people are one of the oldest tribes of Sumatra. They were first encountered by Portuguese explorers in the early 1500s, and at that time referred to themselves as E Lopeh people. Ethnically, they are closely related to the indigenous tribes of Java and Sumatra, from where migration flows directly to Enggano Island. The most anthropologically related people of the Enggano people are the Batak and Nias people, and they are distantly related to the Lampung people (Abung and Pepaduan).

The social organization of the Enggano people retains distinct matrilineal features of the family. The main social unit is the maternal clan (kaudar), an expanded group whose members are descended from a common female ancestor and retain its name. Outsiders from other clans who came later also live in the settlement. Within the maternal clan there are also saompu, large extended families where each family occupies one house. Traditional family property and land are managed by the maternal lineage under the guidance of elders. Communities are governed by elective village councils.

The Enggano people strictly observe matrilineal exogamous marriage traditions, organized into distinct maternal clans (kaudar). Lineage, clan identification, and customary titles pass down exclusively through the maternal line. The core family unit in Enggano society is based on monogamous marriage, as polygamy is strictly forbidden. Marriage settlement is traditionally matrilocal, meaning a husband relocates to his wife's family or communal clan territory after marriage. Consequently, traditional property rights and ancestral land inheritance (kahuaei) are passed from mothers to their daughters, preserving clan territory within the maternal lineage under the supervision of customary tribal elders.

== Modern political orientation ==
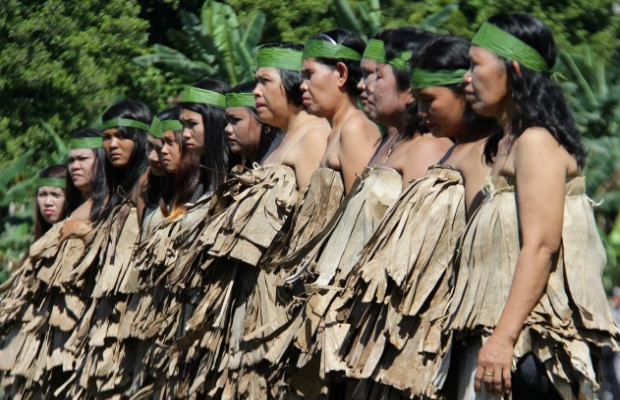
Enggano women play the role of the peacemaker dancers in the Enggano war dance.

Today, the Enggano people, due to prolonged cultural isolation, are on the verge of extinction. They are alien to the neighboring peoples, for example, unlike the Batak people in recent decades, the appearance and growth of ethnic self-awareness are prevalent, especially among the mainstream Indonesians.

== Religion ==
Among the native Enggano people, the majority of the population profess Christianity (mainly Protestantism) and Islam (mainly Sunni). Apart from that, there are places where animism, totemism, and ancestral worship are still being preserved.

== Traditional settlement ==
Enggano settlements are structurally cumulus. Their houses have stilt frames, stacked and rectangular in shape (whereas in the past, they were rounded), while the walls and roof are strengthened by rigid leaves.

== Lifestyle ==
The Enggano people engage in manual farming (maize, yam, peanuts, taro, coconut palm), hunting for turtles, breeding of chickens, and fishing. Handicrafts include weaving, pottery, woodcarving, making of masks and necklaces, weaving mats and ornaments from beads. Wood carvings by the Enggano people have resemble those in Polynesia.

Enggano men wear kain loincloths of various lengths, and the length of the kain in direct proportion testifies to the economic status of its wearer. Enggano women always wear long kain. Men's outer garment is a shirt with long sleeves and a blind collar, while women have a shirt without a collar.

Enggano food is mainly vegetable, and rice is usually bought.

Due to limited currency circulation on the island, items are usually obtained through bartering rather than buying and selling.

== See also ==
- Proto-Malay
