= Enggano language =

Austronesian language spoken in Indonesia

Enggano
- Native to: Indonesia
- Region: Enggano Island, off Sumatra
- Ethnicity: Enggano
- Native speakers: 700 (2011)
- Language family: Austronesian: Malayo-Polynesian; Northwest Sumatra–Barrier Islands?; Enggano

Language codes
- ISO 639-3: eno
- Glottolog: engg1245
- ELP: Enggano
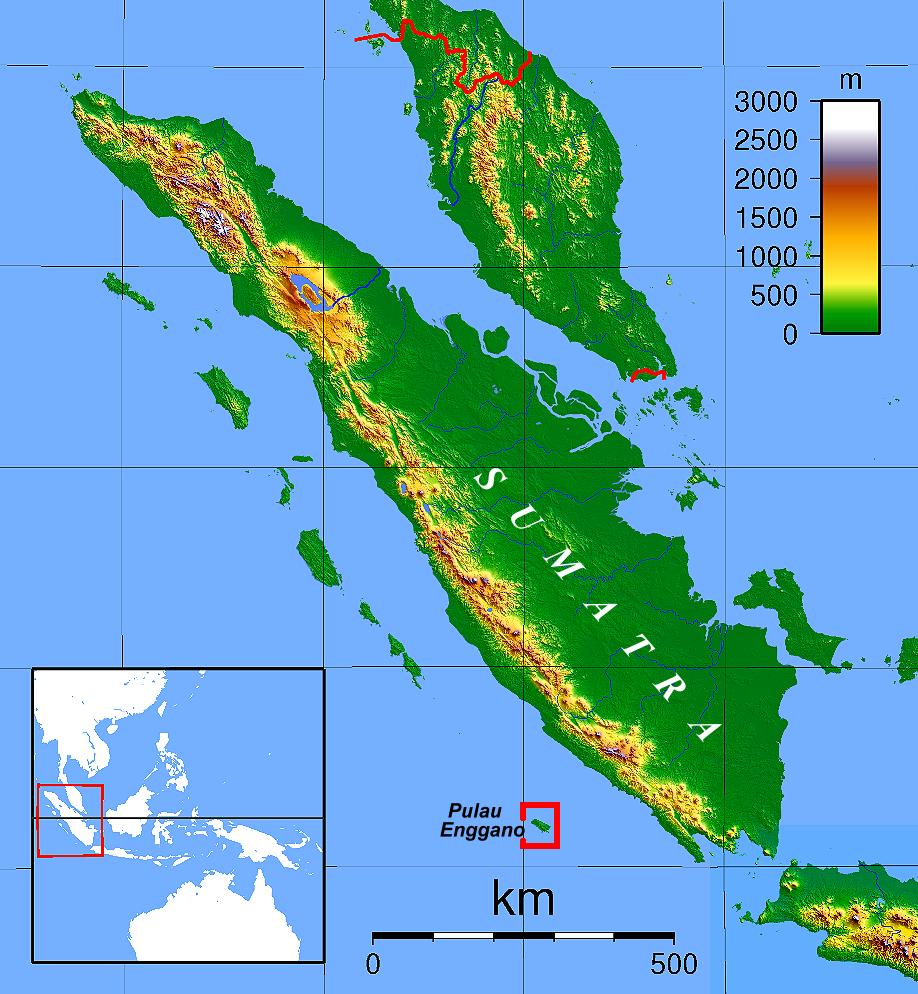
- Enggano Island, in red

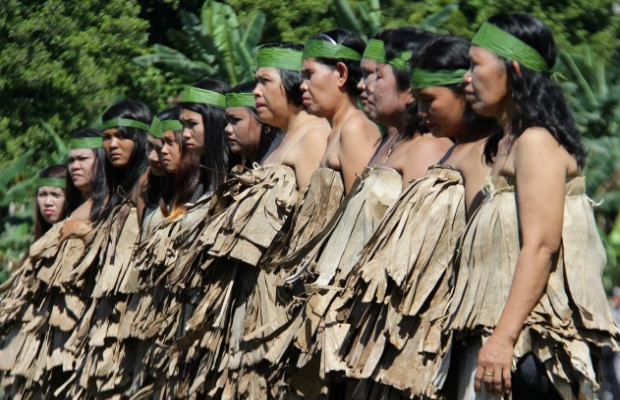
Enggano female dancers

The Enggano language, or Engganese, is an Austronesian language spoken on Enggano Island off the southwestern coast of Sumatra, Indonesia.

Enggano is notable among the Austronesian languages of western Insular Southeast Asia because of many unusual sound changes, and a low number of words shared with other Austronesian languages. There is however general consensus among Austronesianists that Enggano belongs to the Austronesian language family. Failure to fully identify the inherited Austronesian elements in the basic lexicon and bound morphology of Enggano resulted in occasional proposals that Enggano might be a language isolate which had adopted Austronesian loanwords.

When first contacted by Europeans, the Enggano people had more cultural commonalities with indigenous peoples of the Nicobar Islands than with those of Austronesian Sumatra. For instance, beehive houses were typical of both Enggano Island and the Nicobar Islands. However, there are no apparent linguistic connections with Nicobarese or other Austroasiatic languages.

== Classification ==
The classification of Enggano was controversial, ranging from proposals that negate its inclusion in the Austronesian family all the way to classifications that place Enggano in the Northwest Sumatra–Barrier Islands subgroup together with other Austronesian languages of the area (e.g. Nias).

Based on the low number of apparent Austronesian cognates, Capell (1982) proposed that Enggano is a language isolate rather than Austronesian as previously assumed. A similar view was echoed by Blench (2014) based on an inspection of Enggano's lexicon.

Edwards (2015) demonstrates that pronouns, numerals and many affixes in Enggano can be directly derived from Proto-Malayo-Polynesian. Based on this evidence, together with regular sound changes from Proto-Malayo-Polynesian to Enggano, Edwards shows that Enggano clearly belongs to the Malayo-Polynesian branch of the Austronesian languages, thus putting Capell's and Blench's proposals that Enggano is a non-Austronesian language to rest. Within Malayo-Polynesian, he considers Enggano to be a primary branch. While a large portion of its lexicon obviously cannot be derived from Proto-Malayo-Polynesian, it remains unclear whether this represents a non-Austronesian substratum from an unknown source language, or the result of internally-driven lexical replacement. He notes that Enggano possesses many aberrant phonological features (such as a small phonological inventory) and a low lexical retention rate, which is more typical of Austronesian languages spoken in eastern Indonesia and Melanesia than rather than those of western Indonesia. Enggano's lexical retention rate (i.e., percentage of lexical items that are cognate with reconstructed Proto-Austronesian forms) is only 21% (46 out of 217 words), while the lexical retention rate for Malay is 59% (132.5 out of 223 words). Some non-Austronesian languages in Southeast Asia, such as Nancowry, Semelai, and Abui also have low lexical retention rates.

== Evolution ==
Enggano has historically undergone several sound changes which are more far-reaching than changes observed in other Malayo-Polynesian languages of the area. These include for example (PMP = Proto-Malayo-Polynesian):

- PMP *ŋ > h (*taliŋa > e-kadiha)
- PMP *m > b (*Rumaq > e-uba)
- PMP *n > d (*anak > e-ada)
- PMP *s > k (*si-ia > kia)
- PMP *t > k (*mata > e-baka)

As for the last shift, Enggano is the only western Austronesian language in which it is found, while the same change occurred independently several times in Oceanic after *k shifted to glottal stop.

An unusual feature is nasal harmony in its identifiable Austronesian vocabulary, where all stop consonants and vowels in a word became nasal after a nasal vowel, and oral after an oral vowel, so that there is no longer a phonemic distinction between them. For example, *eũ’ada’a became eũ’ãnã’ã, while nasal consonants are no longer found in e-uba 'house' or ʔa-riba 'five' (< PMP *Rumaq, *ka-lima, cf. Malay rumah, lima).

== Phonology ==
The only major linguistic treatment of Enggano was conducted by Hans Kähler in 1937. He published a grammar (1940), a text collection (1955, 1957, 1958, 1960a, 1960b, 1961, 1962, 1964, 1975) and a dictionary (1987). However, the discussion of phonology is limited to a simple inventory and a short paragraph of basic features. The grammar and dictionary disagree with each other, and the dictionary is not consistentː some words are not legible, and doubts have been raised about the accuracy of the transcriptions. Nothofer (1992) discusses loanwords and also lists phonemes. Yoder (2011) is a thesis on Enggano vowels, with some comments on consonants; it will be followed here.

Note that contemporary Enggano, as discussed in Yoder (2011) and Nothofer (1992), has undergone several changes from Old Enggano, as documented by Kähler, including the fact that final vowels are regularly lost (e.g. e-papa 'cheek' becomes pap) and the split of the phoneme /o/. These have an effect on the phonology.

Yoder and Nothofer report seven oral and seven nasal vowels:

	front	central	back
close	i ĩ	ɨ ɨ̃	u ũ
mid	e ẽ	ɘ ɘ̃	o õ
open	a ã		

Diphthongs are /ai, aɨ, au, ei, ɘi, oi/.

Vowels do not occur word-initially in Enggano apart from what Yoder analyzes as /i u/ before another vowel; these are then pronounced as semivowels [j w]. (Nothofer counts these as consonants /j, w/ restricted to initial position, which avoids the problem of not uncommon [ji] being analyzed as /ii/, when sequences of the same vowel are otherwise quite rare.) The vowels /i ɨ u e o/ are all pronounced as semivowels in vowel sequences after medial glottal consonants /ʔ h/, as in /kõʔĩã/ [kõʔjã] (a sp. tree) and /bohoe/ [boho̯e] 'wild'; otherwise, apart from diphthongs, vowel sequences are disyllabic, as in /ʔa-piah/ [ʔapi.ah] 'to graze'. /i/ optionally triggers a glide after a following glottal consonant, as in /ki-ʔu/ [kiʔu ~ kiʔju] 'to say'. Diphthongs lower to [aɪ, aʊ] etc. before a coda stop, as in /kipaʔãũp/ [kĩpãʔãʊ̃p] 'ten', and undergo metathesis when that stop is glottal, as in /kahaiʔ kak/ [kahaʔɪkak] 'twenty'. An intrusive vowel [ə̆] appears between glottal stop and another consonant (though not semivowels), as in /kaʔhɨɘ/ [kaʔ.ə̆.hɨ.ɘ] 'female leader'; this does not affect the pattern of stress.

The offglide of diphthongs lowers before glottal consonants, and a glottal stop may intrude when another word follows, as in /kahaiʔ mɘh/ [kahaʔɪmɘ̃h] 'another'.

		Bilabial	Alveolar	Palatal	Velar	Glottal
Plosive	voiceless	p	t		k	ʔ
Plosive	voiced	b ~ m	d ~ n			
Fricative			s ~ ç ~ x			h
Trill			r ~ n			
Approximant			(l)	j ?	w ?	

Yoder notes that the voiced stops [b~m, d~n] are in complementary distribution, depending on whether the word has nasal vowels (similar to Guarani), but lists them separately. Voiced oral consonants, [b d l r], do not occur in words with nasal consonants or vowels. Nasal consonants nasalize all vowels in a word, and there is therefore no contrast between [m n] and [b d] apart from the contrast between nasal and oral vowels. For example, with the oral stem tax 'bag', the possessive forms are tahi’ 'my bag' and tahib 'your bag', but with the nasal stem 'age', the forms are ’umunu’ 'my age' and ’umunum 'your age'.

/l/ occurs in only a few native words. /s ~ x/ are infrequent and apparently a single phoneme; they only occur word finally, where they contrast with /h/: [x] occurs after the non-front vowels /ɨ ə u/, [ç] after the front vowels /i a ã/, and [s] after vowel sequences ending in /i/ (including /ii, ui/). The resulting [aç ãç] may actually be /aix ãĩx/, as most such words are attested with alternation like [kaç ~ kais] 'box'. When a suffix is added, so that this consonant is no longer word-final, it becomes /h/, as in tahi’ 'my bag' above.

Nothofer is similar, but does not list the uncommon consonants /l/ and /s ~ x/ and counts [j w] as consonants rather than allophones of vowels. Kähler's dictionary adds /ɲ/, as well as /f tʃ dʒ/ as marginal phonemes, and claims that /t r/ are only found in southern villages. However, Yoder states that at the time of his research in 2010 there were no differences among the six villages on Enggano Island, and that initial /t r/ and final /t d/ are rare in native words. Medial /d/ and /r/ are in free variation in a few words, with older people preferring /d/ and younger speakers /r/.

Stress was once reported to be penultimate but now appears to occur on the final syllable. Alternating syllables preceding it have secondary stress.

== Grammar ==
The main reference on the syntax and morphology of the Enggano language is the grammar produced by Hans Kähler. There are also some references to syntax and morphology in more recent work, such as Yoder (2011) and Edwards (2015). This section compares some of the findings in Kähler (1940) with those of Yoder (2011), where the language appears to have undergone some changes.

=== Pronouns ===
The pronouns listed in Kähler (1940) are as follows:

Pronoun	Independent	Enclitic	Proclitic I	Proclitic II
1sg	’ua	-'u	'u-	'u-
1du.INCL	’ika	-ka	ka-	ka-
1pl.INCL	'ika'a	-ka'a	ka- -a'a	ka- -a'a
1pl.EXCL	'ai	-dai, -nãĩ	'u- -'ai	'u- -'ai
2sg	’o'o	-bu, -mũ	u-	'o-
2pl	adiu	-du, -nũ	u- -a'a	'o- -a'a
3sg	kia	-dia, -nĩã	i-	ka-
3pl	ki	-da, -nã	da-	ki-/di-

Kähler notes that the form 'ika'a is not often used and that 'ika can have both dual (speaker + addressee) and plural (speaker + multiple addressees) reference. Enclitic pronouns, which typically express possessors, are subject nasal harmony, depending on whether the root that they attach to contains nasal or oral vowels. There is also a phonological process whereby a vowel is inserted between the glottal stop and the u in the 1sg enclitic -'u. This is the final vowel of the stem to which the suffix attaches, e.g. euba 'house' > euba'au 'my house', ebohe 'spear' > ebohe'eu 'my spear'. Possession can also be indicated using the proclitic pronouns above.

The pronouns listed in Yoder (2011) are as follows:

Enggano pronouns
Pronoun	Independent	Suffix
1sg	’u	-’
we.EXCL	’a	
we.INCL	’ik	-k
2sg	’ə’	-b ~ -m
2pl	’ari	-du ~ -nu
3sg	ki	-d(e) ~ -n(e)
3pl	hamə’	-d(e) ~ -n(e)
this	(pẽ)’ẽ’	
that	’ẽõ’	
who	hã	
what	’i.ah	

Most of these appear to be Austronesian: Compare Malay 1sg aku ~ ku, 1.ex kami, 1.in kita, 2pl kalian, 3sg/pl dia, and suffixes 1sg -ku, 2sg -mu, 3sg -nya, with *k, *t (d), *l, *m, *n having shifted to ’, k, r, b, d in Enggano, and with final consonants and (where possible) vowels being lost. The possessive suffixes appear on nouns, and they are often preceded by a vowel. Few forms are attested, but this vowel is i or ai after [ç] (as with 'bag' in the phonology section), an echo vowel after several other consonants, and with several words not predictable on current evidence: ’eam – ’ami’ '(my) fishing rod'.

=== Nouns ===
According to Kähler, nouns in Enggano can be subcategorised into three different classes: humans, proper nouns and common nouns. They take different articles to indicate singular and plural reference:

Articles in Enggano
Noun Class	Singular	Plural
Human	e-	ka-
Proper	∅-	∅-
Common	e-	e-

Blench notes that e- may be a determiner and Edwards argues that the articles not only mark noun class but also case. Nouns marked with e- and the other articles above can express both subjects and objects. The prefix e- can also be used to derive gerunds from verbal stems. Plural number can also be indicated through reduplication. In this case, the meaning is exhaustive, e.g. all of the nouns.

Nouns with an oblique function, e.g. those expressing nominal possessors, subjects of gerunds and any noun that follows the oblique marker i'ioo, take the article u- in place of e-. Finally, locative nouns take the locative prefix i-.

Nouns in Enggano can be modified by demonstratives and relative clauses. As in other Austronesian languages, these typically follow the nominal head. There are three demonstratives in Enggano:

Demonstratives in Enggano
Demonstrative	Enggano	Rough Translation
Proximal	ei'ie	this
Medial	e'ana	that
Distal	ea'a	that

Relative clauses are introduced by a relativiser mõ'õ. Kähler suggests that older speakers of Enggano would use different relativisers depending on whether the head noun was singular (hemõ’õ) or plural (hõmõ’õ). However, in 1937 when he was conducting research, this practice was already uncommon in everyday language. An example of a relative clause in Enggano is given below. This shows that demonstratives also follow relative clauses:

ka'u'ua-da'a e-uba mõ'õ 'amũhõ ei'ie
beautiful-PRED ART-house REL big PROX.DEM
'This house which is big is beautiful'

Kähler describes some processes of nominal derivation in Enggano. Specifically, he notes that instrumental nouns can be formed via the addition of a vowel or paV- to a verbal root, e.g. poko 'to chisel' > e-opoko 'a chisel' or kui 'to sew' > e-paukui 'needle'. Locative nouns are formed with an -a suffix, e.g. parudu 'gather' > e-parudu-a 'gathering place'.

=== Verbs and Adjectives ===
Adjectives commonly have prefixes ka-, ka’-, ki-; the first two are attested in derivation, and the last is assumed as it is very common and many such adjectives otherwise appear to be reduplicated, as in kinanap 'smooth' (Yoder 2011).

Verbs may have one or two prefixes and sometimes a suffix. According to Kähler, verbs are typically marked with the prefix ki- or bu- (allomorphs b-, mu-, m-, -ub-, -um-) or occur in bare form. Verbs modified with bu- occur in main clauses and take a set of agreement markers (§16). Kähler treats these as shortened pronouns. Verbs in bare form take a different set of agreement markers and occur following the negator keaba'a (§ 15). Kähler calls these 'modified forms'.

Subject Agreement Markers in Enggano
	with bu- verbs	with bare verbs
1sg	ˀu-	ˀu
1du.incl	ka-	ka-
1pl.incl	ka- -aˀa	ka- -aˀa
1pl.excl	ˀu- -ˀai	ˀu- -ˀai
2sg	ˀo-	u-
2pl	ˀo- -aˀa	u- -aˀa
3sg	ka-	i-
3pl	da-/di-/ki-	da-

In addition to ki-, bu- and bare forms, Enggano verbs can take further derivational morphology:

- -i and -a'a applicative suffixes (see section 36 and 37 of the grammar)
- di- passive (see section 38 of the grammar)
- pa- causative (see section 39 and 40 of the grammar)
- aH- which Kähler describes as intensive but functions similarly to an antipassive (see section 42 of the grammar)
- a'a- which Kähler describes as stative but may act as a verbalizer of nominal roots (see section 45 of the grammar)
- aba- which Kähler describes as progressive but may reflect associated motion (see section 47 of the grammar).
- -a future tense or volitional marker (see section 51).

Attested prefixes in Yoder (2011) are ba-, ba’-, ia-, iah-, ka-, ka’-, kah-, ki-, kir-, ko-, pa-, pah-, ’a-. The functions of these are unknown. Ki- and pa- may occur together, as in pe, pape, kipe, kipape, all glossed as 'give'. The three attested verbal suffixes are -i, -ar, -a’ (Yoder 2011).

=== Tense and aspect ===
Future tense is marked through an -a suffix. Past tense/perfective aspect is marked through the auxiliary verb hooː

'ua ki-pudu kia
1sg foc-kill 3sg
'I kill him'

'ua ki-pudu-a kia
1sg foc-kill-fut 3sg
'I will kill him'

'ua hoo bu-pudu kia
1sg perf bu-kill 3sg
'I killed him'

=== Numerals ===
The counting system is, or at least once was, vigesimal: Kähler recorded kahai'i ekaka 'one man' = 20, ariba ekaka 'five man' = 100, kahai'i edudodoka 'one our-body' = 400. (The last may be based on two people counting together: each time I count all twenty of my digits, you count one of yours, so that when you have counted all of your digits, the number is 20×20 = 400.) However, most people now use Malay numerals when speaking Enggano, especially for higher numbers. Yoder (2011) recorded the following:

Numeral	Enggano
1	kahai’
2	’aru
3	’akər
4	’aup
5	’arib
6	’ãkĩ’ãkĩn
7	’arib he ’aru
8	kĩpã’ĩõp, ’ãpã’ĩõp
9	kĩpã’ĩõp kabai kahai’, ’ãpã’ĩõp ’abai kahai’
10	kĩpã’ãũp
20	kahai’ kak

1–5 are Austronesian, assuming ka- is a prefix on 'one' and ’a- is a prefix on 2–5. Compare the remaining -hai’, -ru, -kər, -up, -rib with Lampung əsay, rua, təlu, əpat, lima; *s, *t, *l, *m have shifted to h, k, r, b in Enggano, and final consonants and (simple) vowels have been lost. ’aki’akin, 'six', may be reduplication of ’akər, 'three'. ’arib he ’aru, 'seven', is 'five and two'. The two forms for eight mean 'hugging', from the verb pã’ĩõp 'to hug', and nine appears to be 'eight, one coming'; it may be shortened to kaba kahai’ (no -i) in enumeration. Yoder believes 10 may also be a verb, based on an unelicited root ’ãũp, as ki- and pa- are verbal prefixes (as in ki-pa-pe 'to give'); indeed, the apparent prefixes on 1–5 are identical to verbal prefixes as well.

Numbers above 10 and 20 are formed with he ~ hi 'and': kĩpã’ãũp he ’aru 'ten and two' for 12, kahai’ kak he kĩpã’ãũp 'twenty and ten' for 30. kak is 'person', so twenty is 'one person'. Multiples of twenty are formed from kak, as in ’akər kak he kĩpã’ãũp '70', ’arib kak '100' (also kahai’ ratuh from Malay ratus).

== Bibliography ==
- Blench, Roger, The Enggano: archaic foragers and their interactions with the Austronesian world. Draft 11 August 2014.
- Blust, Robert (2004). "*t to k: An Austronesian sound change revisited". Oceanic Linguistics. 43 (2): 365–410. doi:10.1353/ol.2005.0001. ISSN 0029-8115. JSTOR 3623363. S2CID 143013834.
- Capell, Arthur (1982). "Bezirkssprachen im gebiet des UAN". In Carle, Rainer; Heinschke, Martina; Pink, Peter; Rost, Christel; Stadtlander, Karen (eds.). Gava': Studies in Austronesian languages and cultures dedicated to Hans Kähler. Berlin: Dietrich Reimer. pp. 1–14. ISBN 978-3-496-00513-1.
- Edwards, Owen (2015). "The Position of Enggano within Austronesian". Oceanic Linguistics. 54 (1): 54–109. doi:10.1353/ol.2015.0001. hdl:1885/114506. ISSN 0029-8115. S2CID 145094076.
- Helfrich, O. L. (1893). "Aanvullingen en verbeteringen op de Maleisch–Nederlansch–Enganeesch woordenlijst" (PDF). Tijdschrift voor Indische Taal-, Land- en Volkenkunde (in Dutch). 35. Koninklijk Bataviaasch Genootschap van Kunsten en Wetenschappen: 228–33. hdl:2027/mdp.39015065260294. OCLC 1607509.
- Kähler, Hans (1940). "Grammatischer Abriss des Enggano". Zeitschrift für Eingeborenen-Sprachen. 30: 81–117, 182–210, 296–320.
- Lafeber, Abraham (1922). Vergelijkende klankleer van het Niasisch. s'-Gravenhage: Hadi Poestaka.
- Nothofer, Bernd (1986). "The Barrier Island Languages in the Austronesian Language Family". In Geraghty, Paul; Carrington, Lois; Wurm, S. A. (eds.). Focal II: Papers From the Fourth International Conference on Austronesian Linguistics (PDF). Pacific Linguistics, Series C. Vol. 94. Canberra: Research School of Pacific and Asian Studies, The Australian National University. pp. 87–109. doi:10.15144/PL-C94. hdl:1885/145382. ISBN 978-0-85883-345-6.
- Nothofer, Bernd (1992). "Lehnwörter im Enggano". In Schulze, Fritz; Tauchmann, Kurt (eds.). Kölner Beiträge aus Malaiologie und Ethnologie zu Ehren von Professor Dr. Irene Hilgers-Hesse. Kölner Südostasien Studien. Vol. 1. Bonn: Holos. pp. 21–31. ISBN 3860971204.
- Nothofer, Bernd (1994). "The relationship between the languages of the Barrier Islands and the Sulawesi-Philippine languages". In Dutton, Thomas Edward; Tryon, Darrell T. (eds.). Language contact and change in the Austronesian world. Berlin: Mouton de Gruyter. pp. 389–409. doi:10.1515/9783110883091.389. ISBN 978-3-11-012786-7.
- Smith, Alexander D. (2017). "The Western Malayo-Polynesian Problem". Oceanic Linguistics. 56 (2): 435–490. doi:10.1353/ol.2017.0021. ISSN 0029-8115. S2CID 149377092.
- Yoder, Brendon (2011). Phonological and phonetic aspects of Enggano vowels (PDF) (MA). University of North Dakota. Archived from the original (PDF) on 2020-10-29.
