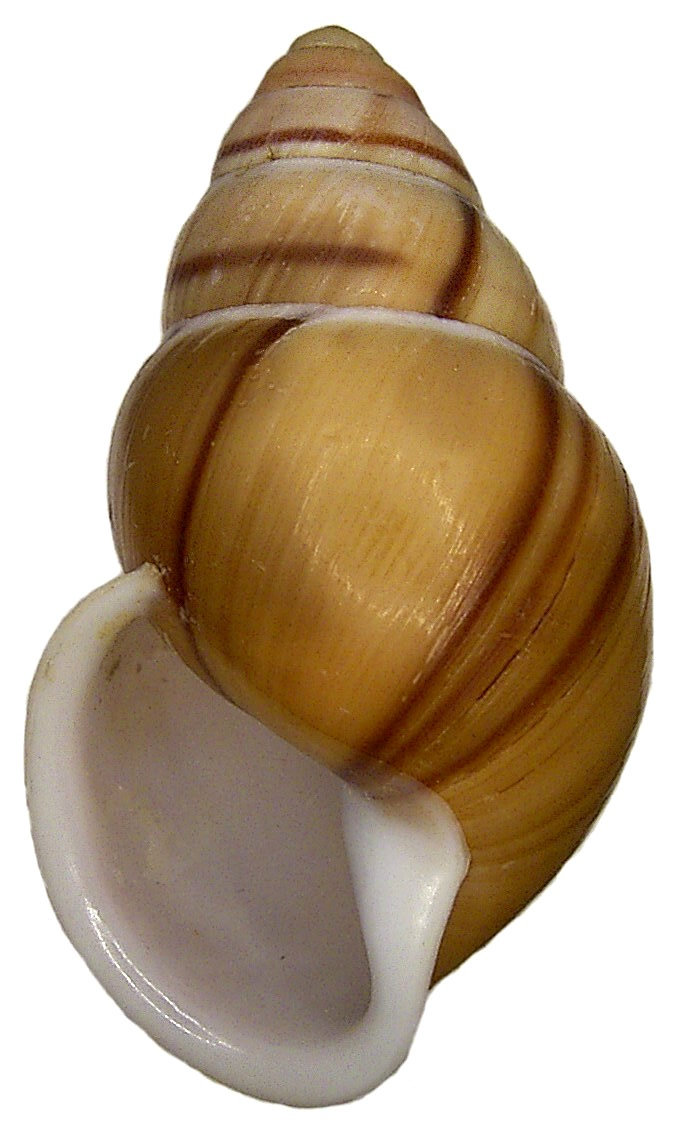
- Shell of Amphidromus enganoensis

Scientific classification
- Kingdom: Animalia
- Phylum: Mollusca
- Class: Gastropoda
- Order: Stylommatophora
- Family: Camaenidae
- Genus: Amphidromus
- Species: A. enganoensis

Binomial name
- Amphidromus enganoensis Fulton, 1896

Synonyms
- Amphidromus enganoensis f. sykesi Fruhstorfer, 190 (suspected synonym)

= Amphidromus enganoensis =

Species of gastropod

Amphidromus enganoensis is a species of air-breathing land snail, a terrestrial pulmonate gastropod mollusc in the family Camaenidae.

Subspecies

- Amphidromus enganoensis fruhstorferi Laidlaw, 1954

== Description ==
The length of the shell attains 49 mm, its diameter 28 mm.

(Original description) This sinistral shell is oblong-ovate, perforate, solid, and glossy, exhibiting oblique striations. The ground color is either yellow or rich brown, sometimes with two or three darker brown spiral bands in the latter case. It consists of seven convex whorls, with the suture deeply impressed and marked by a narrow, white spiral band. The outer lip and the columella are broadly expanded and slightly reflected, their margins joined by a thin, transparent callus. The columella is more or less deflected at its point of insertion.

== Distribution ==
The type species was found on Enggano Island, West Sumatra, Indonesia.
