= Nias language =

Austronesian language spoken in Indonesia

Nias
- Li Niha
- Native to: Indonesia
- Region: Nias and Batu Islands, North Sumatra
- Ethnicity: Nias people
- Native speakers: (770,000 cited 2000 census)
- Language family: Austronesian: Malayo-Polynesian; Northwest Sumatra–Barrier Islands; Northern Barrier Islands; Nias–Sikule; Nias
- Writing system: Latin

Language codes
- ISO 639-2: nia
- ISO 639-3: nia
- Glottolog: nias1242
- Distribution of Nias language speakers in the Nias and Batu islands (nia)

A video of spoken Nias

The Nias language is an Austronesian language spoken on Nias Island and the Batu Islands off the west coast of Sumatra in Indonesia. It is known as Li Niha by its native speakers. It belongs to the Northwest Sumatra–Barrier Islands subgroup which also includes Mentawai and the Batak languages. It had about 770,000 speakers in 2000. There are three main dialects: northern, central and southern. It is an open-syllable language, which means there are no syllable-final consonants.

== Dialects ==
Nias is typically considered to have three dialects.

- Northern dialect: particularly the Gunungsitoli variety, Alasa and Lahewa area.
- South dialect: South Nias, Gomo Area, Telukdalam Area and Batu Islands.
- Central dialect: West Nias, particularly in Sirombu and Mandrehe areas.

Cognate percentage among the dialects of Nias is about 80%.

The northern variant is considered the prestige dialect. The only complete Bible translation is written in the northern dialect and is used by speakers of all dialects.

== Phonology ==
Nias has the following phonemes (sounds only found in the northern dialect are given in green, southern-only sounds are in red):

Vowels
	Front	Central	Back
Close	i		u
Mid	e	ɤ ⟨ö⟩	o
Open		a	

Consonants
		Labial	Dental/ Alveolar	Palato- alveolar	Palatal	Velar	Glottal
Stop/ Affricate	voiceless		t	tʃ ⟨c⟩		k	ʔ ⟨'⟩
Stop/ Affricate	voiced	b	d	dʒ ⟨z⟩		ɡ	
Stop/ Affricate	prenasalized / trilled	ᵐb /ʙ ⟨mb⟩	ⁿdʳ /dʳ ⟨ndr⟩				
Fricative	voiceless	f	s			x ⟨kh⟩	h
Fricative	voiced	v ⟨w⟩	z				
Nasal		m	n			ŋ ⟨ng⟩	
Approximant		ʋ /β ⟨w⟩	l		j ⟨y⟩	w ⟨ŵ⟩	
Trill			r				

Phonetic descriptions of the sounds traditionally written as ⟨mb⟩ and ⟨ndr⟩ greatly vary. Sundermann (1913) and Halawa et al. (1983) describe them as prenasalized stop [ᵐb] and prenasalized trilled stop [ⁿdʳ] for the northern dialect, while Brown (2005) records them as trill [ʙ] and trilled stop [dʳ] for the southern dialect. In an acoustic study of Nias dialects from three locations, Yoder (2010) shows a complex pattern of four phonetic realizations of ⟨mb⟩ and ⟨ndr⟩: plain stop, prenasalized stop, stop with trilled release, stop with fricated release. (Note: "It seems that the variable character of the two phonemes is the only consistent feature that distinguishes them from the regular stops in the same places of articulation, and from the regular alveolar trill." (Yoder 2010, p. 1))

The status of initial [ʔ] is not determined; there are no phonetic vowel-initial words in Nias.

The contrast between [v] and [ʋ] (both written ⟨w⟩ in common spelling) is only observed in the southern dialect. Here, the fricative [v] only occurs in initial position in the mutated form (see §Noun case marking (mutation)) of nouns beginning with f, e.g. fakhe ~ wakhe [vaxe]. The approximant [ʋ] can appear in initial and medial position, and is in free variation with [v] for many speakers of the southern dialect. For the northern dialect, only fricative approximant [ʋ] is reported, corresponding to both sounds of southern Nias. The semivowel [w] is a distinct phoneme and is written ⟨ŵ⟩ in common spelling.

== Grammar ==
Nias has an ergative–absolutive alignment. It is the only known ergative–absolutive language in the world that has a "marked absolutive", which means that absolutive case is marked, whereas ergative case is unmarked.

There are no adjectives in Nias; words with that function are taken by verbs.

=== Pronouns ===
The following table lists the free and bound pronouns of Nias (green = only used in the northern dialect, red = only used in the southern dialect):

Pronouns and pronominal affixes
	independent	absolutive	genitive	ergative realis	S = A irrealis
1.sg.	ya'o / ya'odo / ya'oto	ndra'o(do) / ‑do / ndrao(to)	-gu	u-	gu-
2.sg.	ya'ugö	ndra'ugö / ‑ö / ndraugö	-u / ‑mö	ö-	gö-
3.sg.	ya'ia	ia / ya	-nia	i-	ya-
1.pl.incl.	ya'ita	ita	-da	ta-	da-
1.pl.excl.	ya'aga	ndra'aga / ‑ga	-ma	ma-	ga-
2.pl.	ya'ami	ami / -mi	-mi	mi-	gi-
3.pl.	ya'ira	ira	-ra	la-	ndra-

Independent pronouns are used:

- as the predicate in nominal clauses

Ya'o zia'a
1SG.IND first.born:MUT
'I am the first-born.'

- as the P argument (Note: The terminology used here follows the conventions commonly used in linguistic typology: S for the subject of intransitive verbs; A for the subject of transitive verbs; P for the object of transitive verbs.) of transitive verbs in dependent (including relative and nominalized) clauses

Andrehe'e nasu si-usu ya'o
DIST dog:MUT REL-bite 1SG.IND
'That's the dog that bit me.'

- following certain prepositions and ha 'only'
- in fronted (topicalized) position

Absolutive pronouns are used:

- as the S argument of independent intransitive and nominal clauses (in the southern dialect, only in realis mood)

Mofökhö ndra'o
sick 1SG.ABS
'I am sick.'

- as the P argument of transitive verbs in independent clauses

I-tegu ndra'o ama-gu
3SG.ERG-scold 1SG.ABS father-1SG.GEN
'My father scolds me.'

- as the stimulus with intransitive verbs expressing emotions or states of mind

Ata'u nasu ndrao
afraid dog:MUT 1SG.ABS
'The dog is afraid of me.'

Genitive pronouns are used:

- as possessor, e.g. ama-gu 'my father'
- following certain prepositions, e.g. khö-gu 'to me'
- as the S argument in nominalized intransitive clauses

Löna ahono ve-mörö-nia
not calm NR:MUT-sleep-3SG.GEN
'Her sleep was not restful.'

- as the A argument in nominalized transitive clauses

La-faigi vamaoso-ra
3PL.ERG-see NR:MUT:IPF:raise-3PL.GEN
'They watched them raise [it].'

- as the A argument in relative clauses with the P argument of a transitive verb as head

U-fake zekhula ni-rökhi-nia
1SG.ERG-use coconut:MUT PASS-grate-3SG.GEN
'I used the coconut which she grated.'

Ergative (realis) pronouns are used:

- as the A argument in independent transitive clauses (in the southern dialect, only in realis mood)

I-tataba geu
3SG.ERG-cut wood:MUT
'He cut up the wood.'

Irrealis pronouns are used in the southern dialect:

- as the S argument in independent intransitive clauses in irrealis mood

Gu-möi ba fasa mahemolu
1SG.IRR-go LOC market tomorrow
'I want to go to the market tomorrow.'

- as the A argument in independent transitive clauses in irrealis mood

Gu-moturagö ndraugö khö-ra
1SG.IRR-IRR:tell.about 2SG.ABS DAT-3PL.GEN
'I'm going to tell them about you.'

In the northern dialect, the irrealis pronouns are restricted to third person, and are employed in what Sundermann (1913) calls "jussive" mood.

Ya-mu-'ohe
3SG.JUSS-JUSS-bring
'He shall bring it.'

=== Noun case marking (mutation) ===
Case marking of nouns is indicated in Nias by mutation of the initial consonant. Several consonants are subject to mutation as shown in the table below. Where a word begins in a vowel, either n or g is added before the vowel; the choice of n or g is lexically conditioned. (For example, öri ~ nöri is 'village federation', öri ~ göri is 'bracelet'.)

Initial mutations
Unmutated form	Mutated form
f	v
t	d
s	z
c	z
k	g
b	mb
d	ndr
vowel	n + vowel g + vowel

Other consonants do not change.

==== Unmutated case ====
The unmutated case form is used in citation. It further appears in all functions described above for independent pronouns:

- as the predicate in nominal clauses
- as the P argument of transitive verbs in dependent (including relative and nominalized) clauses
- following certain prepositions and ha 'only'
- in fronted (topicalized) position

Additionally, A arguments in independent transitive clauses appear in unmutated case, cross-referenced by the corresponding ergative or irrealis pronoun.

I-rino vakhe ina-gu
3SG.ERG rice:MUT mother-1SG.GEN
'My mother cooked rice.'

==== Mutated case ====
The mutated case form of the noun corresponds in function to both the absolutive and the genitive pronouns:

- as the S argument of independent intransitive and nominal clauses

Mate zibaya-nia meneßi
die uncle:MUT-3SG.GEN yesterday
'His uncle died yesterday.'

- as the P argument of transitive verbs in independent clauses

I-rino vakhe ina-gu
3SG.ERG rice:MUT mother-1SG.GEN
'My mother cooked rice.'

- as the stimulus with intransitive verbs expressing emotions or states of mind
- as possessor

omo ga'a-gu
house older.sibling:MUT-1SG.GEN
'my brother's house'

- following certain prepositions
- as the S argument in nominalized intransitive clauses
- as the A argument in nominalized transitive clauses
- as the A argument in relative clauses with the P argument of a transitive verb as head
