= Gayo language =

Austronesian language spoken in Sumatra, Indonesia

Gayo
- Basa Gayo
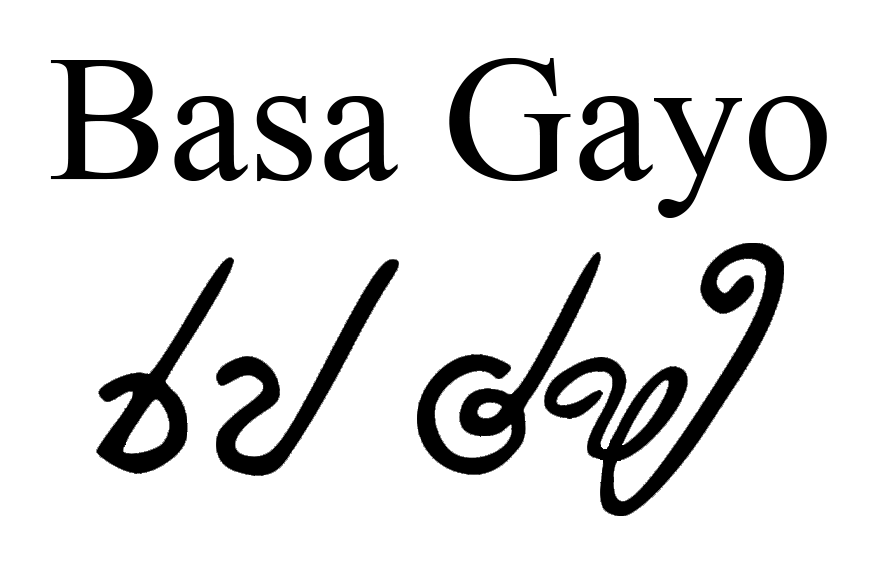
- Basa Gayo written in the Latin script and the Rasi Gayo script
- Native to: Indonesia
- Region: Sumatra
- Ethnicity: 335,000 Gayo (2010 census)
- Native speakers: 275,000 (2010 census)
- Language family: Austronesian: Malayo-Polynesian; Northwest Sumatra–Barrier Islands; Gayo
- Writing system: Latin script

Language codes
- ISO 639-2: gay
- ISO 639-3: gay
- Glottolog: gayo1244

The map of Gayo language in Northern Sumatra.

Gayo (alternatively rendered as Gajo) is an endangered Austronesian language spoken by some 275,000 people in the mountainous region of the Indonesian province Aceh on the northern tip of the island of Sumatra, specifically around the regencies of Central Aceh, Bener Meriah, and Gayo Lues. Apart from that, speakers are also found in East Aceh, North Aceh, Nagan Raya, Southeast Aceh, and Aceh Tamiang. It is classified as belonging to the Western Malayo-Polynesian branch of the Austronesian languages, but is not closely related to other languages. Ethnologue lists Bukit, Dëret, Lues, Lut, and Serbejadi-Lukup as dialects.

Gayo is distinct from other languages in Aceh. The art and culture of the Gayo people is also significantly different compared with other ethnic groups in Aceh.

In 1907, G.A.J. Hazeu wrote a first Gayo–Dutch dictionary for the colonial authorities of the Dutch East Indies.

== Phonology ==
Consonants
		Bilabial	Alveolar	Postalveolar	Palatal	Velar	Glottal	Labial-velar
Nasal		/m/ ⟨m⟩	n ⟨n⟩		ɲ ⟨ny⟩	ŋ ⟨ng⟩		
Plosive	voiceless	/p/ ⟨p⟩	/t/ ⟨t⟩			/k/ ⟨k⟩	/ʔ/ ⟨'⟩	
Plosive	voiced	/b/ ⟨b⟩	/d/ ⟨d⟩			/ɡ/ ⟨g⟩		
Fricative			/s/ ⟨s⟩				/h/ ⟨h⟩	
Affricate	voiceless			/t͡ʃ/ ⟨c⟩				
Affricate	voiced			/d͡ʒ/ ⟨j⟩				
Trill			/r/ ⟨r⟩					
Approximant			/l/ ⟨l⟩		/j/ ⟨y⟩			/w/ ⟨w⟩

Vowels
	Front	Central	Back
Close	/i/ ⟨i⟩		/u/ ⟨u⟩
Near-Close	(ɪ)		(ʊ)
Close-Mid	/e/ ⟨é⟩	/ə/ ⟨e⟩	/o/ ⟨ô⟩
Open-Mid	/ɛ/ ⟨è⟩	/ə/ ⟨e⟩	/ɔ/ ⟨o⟩
Open		/a/ ⟨a⟩/⟨ë⟩	
