= Glenea enganensis =

Scientific classification
- Kingdom: Animalia
- Phylum: Arthropoda
- Class: Insecta
- Order: Coleoptera
- Suborder: Polyphaga
- Infraorder: Cucujiformia
- Family: Cerambycidae
- Genus: Glenea
- Species: G. enganensis

Binomial name
- Glenea enganensis Breuning, 1982

Species of beetle

Glenea enganensis is a species of beetle in the family Cerambycidae. It was described by Stephan von Breuning in 1982. It is found on Enggano Island.
