= Nasal language =

Austronesian language spoken on Sumatra

Nasal
- Native to: Indonesia
- Region: Southwestern Sumatra
- Native speakers: 3,000 (2008)
- Language family: Austronesian: Malayo-Polynesian; Sumatran ?; Nasal

Language codes
- ISO 639-3: nsy
- Glottolog: nasa1239
- ELP: Nasal

Nasal ([naˈsal]) is an Austronesian language of southwestern Sumatra.

== Classification ==
Anderbeck & Aprilani (2013) consider Nasal to be an isolate within the Malayo-Polynesian branch.

Smith (2017), though, includes the language in the "Sumatran" subgroup, alongside other Batak–Barrier Islands languages. Billings & McDonnell (2022) presents further evidence for Nasal as a Sumatran language.

== Background ==
Nasal is spoken in the Nasal River area of Kaur Regency, Bengkulu Province, Sumatra, in the villages of Tanjung Betuah, Gedung Menung (both in Muara Nasal district), and Tanjung Baru (in Maje district). There are many loanwords from Lampung. Languages spoken near the Nasal area include the Krui dialect of Lampung and the Malayic languages Kaur, Bengkulu, Serawai and Semenda (Anderbeck & Aprilani 2013:3). The language has been given a tentative EGIDS rating of 6a (Vigorous), though this is based on early sociolinguistic surveying, and language vitality has yet to be fully assessed.
