= Mentawai language =

Austronesian language spoken in Indonesia

Mentawai
- Nganga Simatawe
- Native to: West Sumatra, Indonesia
- Region: Mentawai Islands
- Native speakers: (58,000 cited 2000 census)
- Language family: Austronesian: Malayo-Polynesian; Northwest Sumatra–Barrier Islands; Mentawai

Language codes
- ISO 639-3: mwv
- Glottolog: ment1249

The Mentawai language is an Austronesian language, spoken by the Mentawai people of the Mentawai Islands, West Sumatra, Indonesia.

== Dialects ==
According to Ethnologue, Mentawai dialects include: Silabu, Sipura – Simalegi, Sakalagan, Saumanganja – North Siberut, South Siberut – Taikaku – Pagai.

Syamsir Arifin, et al. (1992) list twelve dialects of Mentawai:

- Mentawai
  - South Siberut
    - Madobat
    - Salappa
    - Ulubaga
  - Sipora
    - Bariulou
    - Bosua
    - Sioban
  - North Pagai
    - Pasapuat
    - Silabu
    - Saumanganya
  - South Pagai
    - Boriai
    - Bulasat
    - Sikakap

Dialects in Siberut Island are:

- Sikapone
- Togiiite
- Pokai
- Simajegi
- Simatalu
- Paipajet
- Sakuddei
- Sagulubbe
- Sirileleu
- Sikabaluan
- Sempungan
- Saibi & Sarabua
- Silaoinan
- Sarareiket
- Sabirut

== Phonology ==
=== Consonants ===
		Labial	Alveolar	Palatal	Velar
Nasal		m	n	ɲ	ŋ
Plosive/ Affricate	voiceless	p	t	(t͡ɕ)	k
Plosive/ Affricate	voiced	b	d	d͡ʑ	ɡ
Fricative			s		
Lateral			l		
Rhotic			r		
Semivowel		w		j	

- Allophones of /b ɡ k/ can be heard as [β ɣ ʔ]. [t͡ɕ] is a distinct sound in Mentawai, but not given phoneme status by Syamsir et al. because of the lack of minimal contrasts.
- The semivowels /w j/ only appear in final position.

=== Vowels ===
	Front	Central	Back
Close	i		u
Mid	e		o
Open		a	

== Bibliography ==
- Arifin, Syamsir; Malano, Nasroel; Kasim, Yuslina (1992). Fonologi Bahasa Mentawai [Mentawai Language Phonology] (PDF) (in Indonesian). Jakarta: Pusat Pembinaan dan Pengembangan Bahasa, Departemen Pendidikan dan Kebudayaa.
- Adriani, N. (1928). "Spraakkunstige Schets van de Taal der Mĕntawai-Eilanden" [Grammar Sketch of the Language of the Mĕntawai Islands]. Bijdragen tot de Taal-, Land- en Volkenkunde van Nederlandsch-Indië (in Dutch). 84 (1): 1–117. doi:10.1163/22134379-90001493. JSTOR 20770239.
