= Kayaapu =

- Village
- Location within Sumatra
- Coordinates: 5°26′00″S 102°24′00″E
- Country: Indonesia
- Province: Bengkulu
- Regency: North Bengkulu
- Island: Enggano
- Time zone: UTC-7 (Indonesia Western Standard Time (WIB))

Kayaapu (also spelled Kahyapu or Khayapu) is a village on Enggano Island, Indonesia. Along with Barhau, it is one of the two main villages of the island. It is located roughly 500 kilometers from Jakarta.
