= Barhau =

- Village
- Location within Sumatra
- Coordinates: 5°19′00″S 102°10′00″E
- Country: Indonesia
- Province: Bengkulu
- Regency: North Bengkulu
- Island: Enggano
- Time zone: UTC-7 (Indonesia Western Standard Time (WIB))

Barhau is the largest village and one of the two main population centers of Enggano Island, Indonesia, alongside Kayaapu, located in its northwestern extremity. As with the other three villages on the island, reaching it is difficult mainly due to the island's remoteness and thick vegetation that can be found all across the island.
