= Enggano Island =

Island in Indonesia

Enggano
- Location within Sumatra

Geography
- Location: South East Asia
- Coordinates: 5°24′S 102°15′E
- Area: 400.60 km^{2} (154.67 sq mi)

Administration
- Indonesia
- Province: Bengkulu

Demographics
- Population: 4,502 (mid 2023 estimate)
- Pop. density: 11.24/km^{2} (29.11/sq mi)

Enggano Island (Pulau Enggano) is about 114 kilometres (71 miles) southwest of Sumatra, Indonesia. It is one of the 92 officially listed outlying islands of Indonesia, though it can also be considered a barrier island of Sumatra.

== Geography ==
Enggano (from Portuguese engano "mistake") is about 29 kilometres (18 miles) long from east to west and about 14 kilometres (8.7 miles) wide from north to south. Its area is 400.6 square kilometres (154.7 square miles) including four small offshore islands around its coast - Pulau Merbau, Pulau Dua and tiny Pulau Banggai off Enggano's east coast, and Pulau Satu off its south coast. The average elevation is about 100 metres (330 feet), and the highest point is 281 metres (922 feet).

=== Villages ===
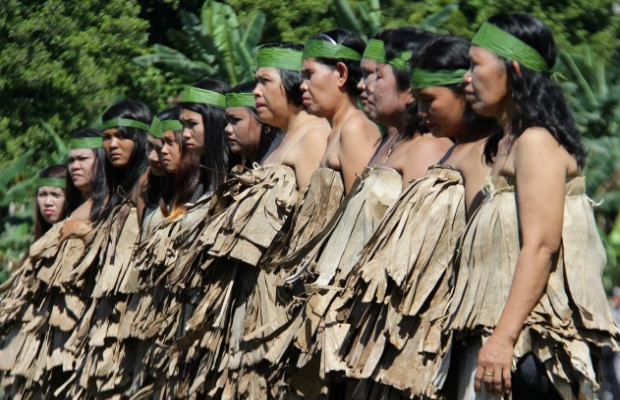
Enggano female dancers

There are six villages on Enggano Island, which are all located on the island's only main road, which traverses the island's north-east coast (Yoder 2011:6).

- Kayaapu
- Kaana
- Malakoni
- Apoho
- Meok
- Banjarsari

Malakoni, Apoho, and Meok have more Enggano natives, and the other villages have larger immigrant populations. There are ferries to Bengkulu from Kahayapu and Malakoni (Yoder 2011:6). A small island just across from Kahyapu is named 'Pulau Dua' (second island). On Pulau Dua there is only one place to spend the night.

== Demography ==
Politically, it forms a district (kecamatan) of the North Bengkulu Regency of the Indonesian province of Bengkulu. The three largest villages on the island are Barhau, Kabuwe and Kayaapu. According to the Indonesian Kantor Statistik for Bengkulu, the island had 1,420 inhabitants in 1989. This number rose, according to the Pukesmas, to 1,635 by 1994, with 64% of the population claiming descent from the Engganese people. There has subsequently been much immigration, mainly from Java and Sumatra, so that the original Engganese are much outnumbered by the new arrivals. There were 2,691 inhabitants at the 2010 Census, and the 2020 Census showed a population of 4,035, while the official estimate as at mid 2023 was 4,502.

== History ==
The name of the island suggests some early contact with Portuguese traders (engano means 'mistake'), but the earliest published account is that of Cornelis de Houtman, dating from 5 June 1596, who was unable to land a boat.

In 1771, Charles Miller succeeded in landing and meeting the indigenous population.

With great difficulty and danger we beat up the whole South-west side of it, without finding any place where we could attempt to land; and we lost two anchors and had very near suffered shipwreck before we found a secure place into which we might run the vessel. At last, however we discovered a spacious harbour at the South-east end of the island and I immediately went into it in the boat, and ordered the vessel to follow me as soon as possible, for it was then a dead calm. We rowed directly into this bay; and as soon as we had got round the point of an island which lay off the harbour, we discovered all the beach covered with naked savages who were all armed with lances and clubs; and twelve canoes all full of them who, till we had passed them, had lain concealed, immediately rushed out upon me, making a horrid noise: this, you may suppose, alarmed us greatly; and as I had only one European and four black soldiers, besides the four lascars that rowed the boat. I thought it best to turn, if possible under the guns of the vessel before I ventured to speak with them.

Eventually, he met these, "noble savages" and learned something of their natural, matriarchal, atheist, and property-sharing culture.

They are a tall, well-made people; the men in general are about five feet eight or ten inches high; the women are shorter and more clumsily built. They are of a red colour, and have straight, black hair, which the men cut short, but the women let grow long, and roll up in a circle on the top of their heads very neatly. The men go entirely naked, and the women wear nothing more than a very narrow slip of plantain leaf.

They seemed to look at every thing about the vessel very attentively; but more from the motive of pilfering than from curiosity, for they watched an opportunity and unshipped the rudder of the boat, and paddled away with it.

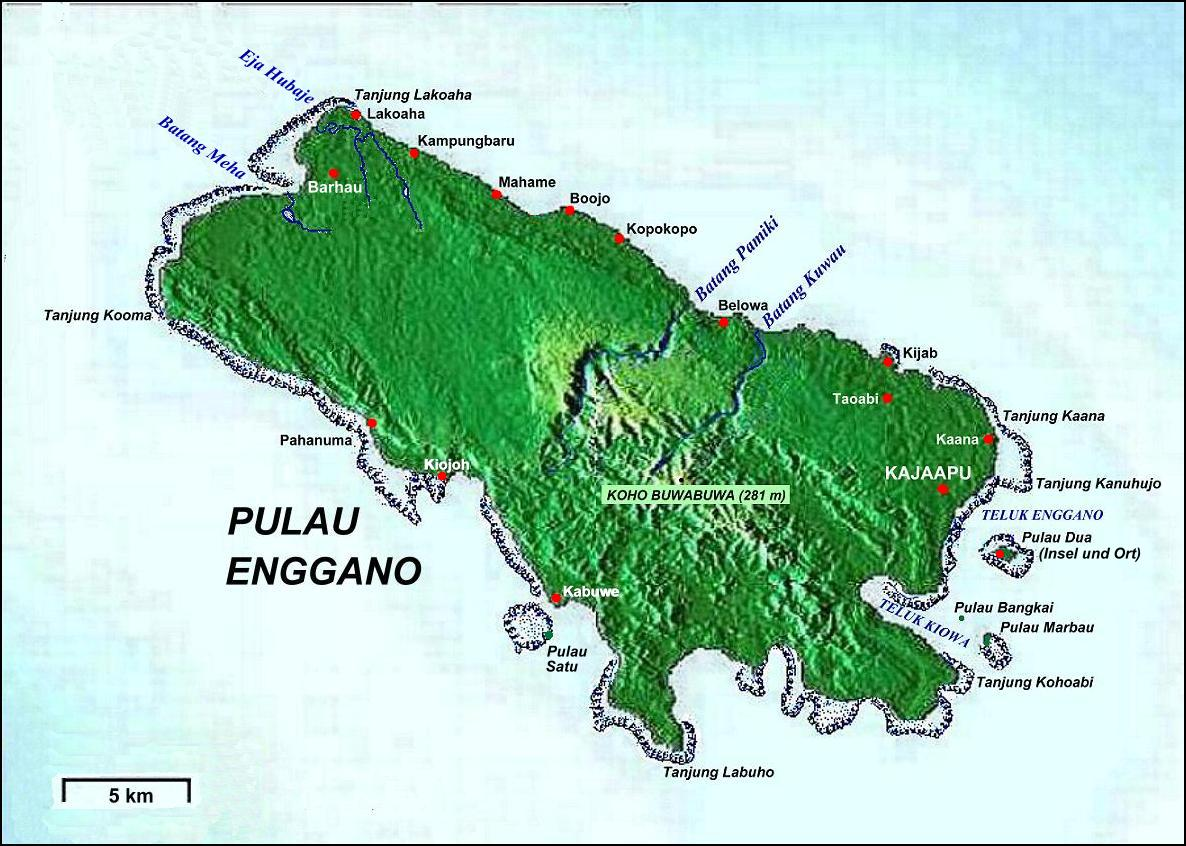
Enggano Island map

Italian explorer Elio Modigliani visited Enggano Island between 25 April and 13 July 1891. He detailed the apparently dominant role of women in Enggano culture in L'Isola delle donne (The Island of Women), first published in 1894. The Rijksmuseum has an important collection of Enggano artifacts and their publication by Pieter J.ter Keurs reproduces Modigliani's drawings.

The population went into severe decline by the 1880s due to repeated deadly epidemics, piracy, slave raids, and the integration of the island into colonial forced labor and cash crop systems. The Dutch sent medical officers to investigate these health conditions. Because the island's highest point is only 281 m (922 ft) above sea level, it was further devastated by the tsunami and massive volcanic debris associated with the 1883 eruption of Krakatoa.

The indigenous population failed to recover and numbered only about 400 people in the early 1960s. Therefore, the Indonesian government uses the island for rehabilitation of juvenile offenders from Java, who perform forced labor, clearing bush and constructing rice fields. As noted above, the population has expanded considerably since that time, and reached 4,035 at the 2020 Census.

The 7.9 M_{w} Enggano earthquake shook southwestern Sumatra with a maximum Mercalli intensity of VI (Strong). One-hundred and three people were killed and 2,174–2,585 were injured.

=== Spaceport plans ===
The Indonesian National Institute of Aeronautics and Space (LAPAN) has proposed the island for use as a spaceport, citing its "low population and remoteness" as decisive criteria, as well as its closeness to the equator.

The regional government immediately protested the plan as environmentally problematic.

In February 2011, a plan to conduct an environmental impact study was announced, chiefly surveying avian populations.

== Enggano language ==
It is not clear whether the Enggano language, also known as Engganese, is a member of the Austronesian (specifically Malayo-Polynesian) language — albeit a highly lexically divergent one, not closely related to any other member of that family — or is instead a language isolate, but with some elements borrowed from Austronesian.

== Flora and fauna ==
There are a number of plant and animal species endemic to the island. These include the bird species Enggano scops owl, Enggano imperial pigeon, Enggano thrush, Enggano hill myna, and Enggano white-eye. The island has been recognised as an Important Bird Area (IBA) by BirdLife International.
