= Bernd Nothofer =

German linguist (1941–2025)

- Born: 18 December 1941; Krefeld, Germany
- Died: 5 January 2025 (aged 83); Eschbach, Germany
- Occupation: Linguist

Academic background
- Education: Yale University

Academic work
- Institutions: Goethe University Frankfurt
- Main interests: Austronesian languages

Bernd Nothofer (18 December 1941 – 5 January 2025) was a German linguist. His primary research interests included Austronesian historical linguistics, Malayic dialectology, and the languages of Indonesia.

== Early life and education ==
Nothofer was born on 18 December 1941. After graduating from high school, Nothofer studied in Bonn starting from 1962. In 1966, he obtained a License de Lettre libre at the Université de Franche-Comté in Besançon, France and taught German and French philology at Millersville State College in Pennsylvania, United States.

From 1967 to 1973, he studied linguistics with Isidore Dyen at Yale University. In 1973, he graduated with PhD in Linguistics after completing fieldwork in the Indonesian provinces of West Java and Central Java. In 1977, he completed his habilitation at the University of Cologne.

== Career ==
From 1973 to 1981, Nothofer was a research assistant at the University of Cologne and lecturer at the Rheinische Friedrich-Wilhelms-Universität Bonn. In 1981, he joined Goethe University in Frankfurt am Main, where he was Professor at the Institute for Southeast Asian Studies until his retirement in 2008.

From 1985 to 2000, he was a visiting professor at Universitas Indonesia, Universitas Andalas, University of Brunei Darussalam, Universitas Gadjah Mada, the Australian National University, University of Hawaii, Universiti Kebangsaan Malaysia, and the University of Melbourne.

In 2006, he was honored with the festschrift Insular Southeast Asia: linguistic and cultural studies in honor of Bernd Nothofer in Frankfurt.

In 2012, another festschrift in honor of Nothofer was published in Yogyakarta, titled Seminar Sehari bersama Prof. Dr. Bernd Nothofer dan Purnabakti Dr. Inyo Yos Fernandez.

== Personal life and death ==
Nothofer was married and had three children. He died in Eschbach on 5 January 2025, at the age of 83.

== Selected publications ==
- The reconstruction of Proto-Malayo-Javanic. In: Verhandelingen van het Koninklijk Instituut voor Taal-, Land- en Volkenkunde 73 (1975). Nijhoff, The Hague.
- Dialektgeographische Untersuchungen in West-Java und im westlichen Zentraljava. 2 Bände. Harrassowitz, Wiesbaden 1980.
- Dialektatlas von Zentral-Java. Harrassowitz, Wiesbaden 1981.
- with K.-H. Pampus, Gloria und Soepomo Poedjosoedarmo: Bahasa Indonesia. Indonesisch für Deutsche. Teil 1. Groos, Heidelberg 1985.
- with K.-H. Pampus, Gloria und Soepomo Poedjosoedarmo: Bahasa Indonesia. Indonesisch für Deutsche. Teil 2. Groos, Heidelberg 1987.
- (editor). Die deutsche Malaiologie. Festschrift zu Ehren von Frau Professor Dr. Irene Hilgers-Hesse. Groos, Heidelberg 1988.
- with K.-H. Pampus: Bahasa Indonesia. Indonesisch für Deutsche. Teil 1. Zweite, vollständig überarbeitete Auflage. Groos, Heidelberg 1988.
- (editor). Reconstruction, Classification, Description. Festschrift in Honor of Isidore Dyen. Abera, Hamburg 1997.
- Dialek Melayu Bangka. Penerbit Universiti Kebangsaan Malaysia, Bangi 1997.
- Pengantar etimologi. Badan Pengembangan dan Pembinaan Bahasa Indonesia, Jakarta 2013.
