= Western Malayo-Polynesian languages =

Paraphyletic grouping of Austronesian languages

Western Malayo-Polynesian
- (obsolete)
- Geographic distribution: Southeast Asia and Madagascar
- Linguistic classification: Austronesian: Malayo-Polynesian; Western Malayo-Polynesian

Language codes
- ISO 639-5: pqw
- ISO 639-3: –
- Glottolog: None

The Western Malayo-Polynesian (WMP) languages, also known as the Hesperonesian languages, are a paraphyletic grouping of Austronesian languages that includes those Malayo-Polynesian languages that do not belong to the Central–Eastern Malayo-Polynesian (CEMP) branch. This includes all Austronesian languages spoken in Madagascar, Mainland Southeast Asia, the Philippines, the Greater Sunda Islands (including smaller neighboring islands), Bali, Lombok, the western half of Sumbawa, Palau and the Mariana Islands.

Western Malayo-Polynesian was originally proposed by Robert Blust as a sister branch within Malayo-Polynesian coordinate to the CEMP branch. Because there are no features that define the WMP languages positively as a subgroup, recent classifications have abandoned it.
