= Northwest Sumatra–Barrier Islands languages =

Subgroup of the Austronesian language family

Northwest Sumatra–Barrier Islands
- Barrier Islands–Batak, Sumatran
- Geographic distribution: Sumatra, Indonesia
- Linguistic classification: Austronesian: Malayo-Polynesian; Northwest Sumatra–Barrier Islands
- Proto-language: Proto-Northwest Sumatra–Barrier Islands (Proto-Sumatran)

Language codes
- Glottolog: nort2829
- Distribution of the languages (except Enggano).

The Northwest Sumatra–Barrier Islands languages (also Barrier Islands–Batak languages or Sumatran languages) are a group of Malayo-Polynesian languages spoken by the Batak and related peoples in the interior of North Sumatra and by the Nias, Mentawai people, and others on the Barrier islands (Simeulue, Nias, and Mentawai Islands Regency) off the western coast of Sumatra, Indonesia.

== Classification ==
The languages of the Northwest Sumatra–Barrier Islands subgroup are:

- Gayo
- Batak languages
- Simeulue
- Nias–Sikule
- Mentawai
- Enggano (?)

This subgroup was first proposed by Lafeber (1922), who called it "Batak-Nias". Nothofer (1986) presented lexical and phonological evidence in support of this subgroup, calling it "Barrier Islands–Batak".

The position of the highly divergent Enggano language is controversial. Both Lafeber (1922) and Nothofer (1986) include Enggano as a probable daughter language. This is rejected by Edwards (2015) who considers Enggano a primary branch of the Malayo-Polynesian languages. Recent research by Smith (2017) however supports the inclusion of Enggano within his tentative "Sumatran" subgroup, which is an extended version of Northwest Sumatra–Barrier Islands that further includes the Nasal language spoken in Bengkulu in southwestern Sumatra. Smith's proposal is supported by Billings & McDonnell (2022) who classify the Sumatran languages as follows:

- Batak languages
- Northern Barrier Islands (Simeulue)
- Central Barrier Islands (Sikule, Nias)
- Mentawai
- Gayo
- Nasal
- Enggano

As phonological evidence for the inclusion of these languages with the Sumatran subgroup they propose:

Mergers

1. PMP *j, *g > Proto-Sumatran *g
2. PMP *z, *d > Proto-Sumatran *d
3. PMP *ñ, *n > Proto-Sumatran *n
4. PMP *R, *r > Proto-Sumatran *r
5. PMP *h > Proto-Sumatran zero

Shift (sound change)

1. PMP *q > Proto-Sumatran *h

== Lexicon ==
Edwards (2015: 78) provides the following table comparing body part vocabulary items across various languages of the Barrier Islands. Edwards (2015: 89) considers the aberrant Enggano language as not part of the Barrier Islands-Batak languages.

Gloss	PMP	Enggano	Mentawai	Nias	Sikule	Simeulue
head	*qulu	e-(ʔ)udu	uteʔ	həɡə	tuhu	ulu
hair, head	*buhek	e-pududui	alai	bu	bu	buʔ
face	*daqih	e-baka	mata	bava	muko	bobaŋon
eye	*mata	e-baka	mata	hərə	mata	mata
nose	*ijuŋ	ẽ-pãnũ	asak	ixu	nixu	ixuŋ
mouth	*baqbaq	e-kaʔa	ŋaŋa	bava	bafa	ba(ʔ)ba
lips	*biRbiR	e-ukudipo	bibo	beve	befe	befil
tongue	*dilaq	e-dio†	lila, ʤala	lela	l/nela	dila
tooth	*nipen	e-kaʔa	ʧon	ifɨ	ifɨ	ehen
ear	*taliŋa	e-kadiha	taliŋa	taliŋa	ɡuɡuyu	(k)oeuʔ
neck	*liqeR	ẽ-ũʔũ	lolokat	baɡi	ʔoɡu	leŋɡəl
hand	*kamay/*lima	e-ʔapo	kabei	bələxa, taŋa	taŋa	kaoʔ, siʔu
fingernail	*kanuhkuh	ẽ-kanũʔũnũ	sulet	siʔa	tena	tenab˺
breast	*titi(q)/*susu	e-koko	tottot	susu	totoʔ	totuʔ
belly	*tian	e-kitai	baɣa	talu	amatan	besil
leg	*qaqay	e-ae	dere	ahe	ae	haɨ
knee	*tuhud	ẽ-pũʔũ u-ae	bókolo	tuhi	bohun	boxul
hair, body	*bulu	e-pududui	bulu	bu	bu	buʔ
skin	*kulit	e-ʔudi	kulit	uli	bebi	bebiʔ
meat/flesh	*hesi	e-heda	akkelak	naɡole	ö(h)i	isi
fat/grease	*miñak/*himaR	ẽ-mĩnãʔã‡	lainak	tavə	tafɨ	tafɨ
bone	*tuqelaŋ	e-ʔaa	tolat	təla	tɨ/öla	sod˺
heart	*pusuq	e-báhau, ẽ-kẽmã	teinuŋ	tədə	ɨlaxa, oho	ate
blood	*daRaq	e-kiaki	loɣau	do	do	dala
liver	*qatay	ẽ-nĩũnĩũ	atei	ate		bala
urine	*iheq	ẽ-ĩkõ	kia	iə	xiɨ	k/xiɨ
excrement	*taqi	e-kai	tanai	tai	tai	tai

Proto-Sumatran lexical innovations listed by Billings & McDonnell (2022) are:

English gloss	Proto-Sumatran	Pre-Gayo	Proto-Batak languages	Proto-Northern Barrier Islands	Proto-Central Barrier Islands	Pre-Mentawai	Nasal
friend	*alay		*aley	*alay	*le	*aley	
to kiss	*aŋgəh		*aŋgəh	*aŋkə	*ago		
ginger	*bahiŋ		*bahiŋ	*baiŋ			
heron	*baruŋ		*baruŋ	*baluŋ			
bat	*bəŋkik		*bəŋkik	*bəŋiʔ	*bəgi		
maggot	*bərŋay		*bərŋey	*bəŋay			
mountain	*dələg		*dələg	*dələk	*lələ	*lelew	
nest	*hasar	*asay	*asar				hasal
sibling in law	*lakun	*lakun		*laʔun	*laʔo	*lakun	
one	*sada	*sara	*sada	*sara	*sara	*sara	
snail	*ciəh		*cih				siyuh
roof	*tarub		*tarub	*talup			
low	*təruh	*tuyuh	*təruh	*təlu	*tou		
midday	*tigər		*tigər	*tikəl	*sixo		
smoke	*timbər		*timbər	*timbəl	*simbo	*timbo	
to ask for	*tindaw	*tiro		*tindaw	*sində	*tidow	
rattan	*puləgəs		*puləgəs			*pulege	
