= Malayo-Polynesian languages =

Major subgroup of the Austronesian language family

Malayo-Polynesian
- Geographic distribution: Southeast Asia, East Asia, the Pacific, Madagascar
- Linguistic classification: Austronesian: Malayo-Polynesian
- Proto-language: Proto-Malayo-Polynesian
- Subdivisions: Barito; Celebic; Central–Eastern Malayo-Polynesian(?); Chamorro; Greater North Borneo(?); Javanese; Malayo-Sumbawan(?); Northwest Sumatra–Barrier Islands; Palauan; Philippine(?); South Sulawesi; Lampungic

Language codes
- ISO 639-5: poz
- Glottolog: mala1545
- The western sphere of Malayo-Polynesian languages. (The bottom three are Central-Eastern Malayo-Polynesian) Philippine (not shown: Yami in Taiwan) North Bornean + Barito other Western Malayo-Polynesian languages (obsolete grouping) Central Malayo-Polynesian South Halmahera–West New Guinea the westernmost Oceanic languages

- The branches of the Oceanic languages: Admiralties and Yapese St Matthias Western Oceanic Temotu Southeast Solomons Southern Oceanic Micronesian Fijian–Polynesian (not shown: Rapa Nui) Black ovals at the northwestern limit of Micronesia are the non-Oceanic languages Palauan and Chamorro. Black circles within green are offshore Papuan languages.

The Malayo-Polynesian languages are a subgroup of the Austronesian languages, with approximately 385.5 million speakers. The Malayo-Polynesian languages are spoken by the Austronesian peoples outside of Taiwan, in the island nations of Southeast Asia (Indonesia and the Philippine Archipelago) and the Pacific Ocean, with a smaller number in continental Asia in the areas near the Malay Peninsula, with Cambodia, Vietnam and the Chinese island Hainan as the northwest geographic outlier. Malagasy, spoken on the island of Madagascar off the eastern coast of Africa in the Indian Ocean, is the furthest western outlier.

Two morphological characteristics of the Malayo-Polynesian languages are a system of affixation and reduplication (repetition of all or part of a word, such as wiki-wiki) to form new words. Like other Austronesian languages, they have small phonemic inventories; thus a text has few but frequent sounds. The majority also lack consonant clusters. Most also have only a small set of vowels, five being a common number.

== Major languages ==
All major and official Austronesian languages belong to the Malayo-Polynesian subgroup. Malayo-Polynesian languages with more than five million speakers are: Indonesian, Javanese, Sundanese, Tagalog, Bikol, Malagasy, Malay, Cebuano, Madurese, Ilocano, Hiligaynon, and Minangkabau. Among the remaining more than 1,000 languages, several have national/official language status, e.g. Tongan, Samoan, Māori, Gilbertese, Fijian, Hawaiian, Palauan, and Chamorro.

== Terminology ==
The term "Malayo-Polynesian" was originally coined in 1841 by Franz Bopp as the name for the Austronesian language family as a whole, and until the mid-20th century (after the introduction of the term "Austronesian" by Wilhelm Schmidt in 1906), "Malayo-Polynesian" and "Austronesian" were used as synonyms. The current use of "Malayo-Polynesian" denoting the subgroup comprising all Austronesian languages outside of Taiwan was introduced in the 1970s, and has eventually become standard terminology in Austronesian studies.

== Classification ==
=== Relation to Austronesian languages on Taiwan ===
In spite of a few features shared with the Eastern Formosan languages (such as the merger of proto-Austronesian *t, *C to /t/), there is no conclusive evidence that would link the Malayo-Polynesian languages to any one of the primary branches of Austronesian on Taiwan.

=== Internal classification ===
Malayo-Polynesian consists of a large number of small local language clusters, with the one exception being Oceanic, the only large group which is universally accepted; its parent language Proto-Oceanic has been reconstructed in all aspects of its structure (phonology, lexicon, morphology and syntax). All other large groups within Malayo-Polynesian are controversial.

The most influential proposal for the internal subgrouping of the Malayo-Polynesian languages was made by Robert Blust who presented several papers advocating a division into two major branches, viz. Western Malayo-Polynesian and Central-Eastern Malayo-Polynesian.

Central-Eastern Malayo-Polynesian is widely accepted as a subgroup, although some objections have been raised against its validity as a genetic subgroup. On the other hand, Western Malayo-Polynesian is now generally held (including by Blust himself) to be an umbrella term without genetic relevance. Taking into account the Central-Eastern Malayo-Polynesian hypothesis, the Malayo-Polynesian languages can be divided into the following subgroups (proposals for larger subgroups are given below):

- Malayo-Polynesian
  - Philippine (disputed)
    - Batanic languages
    - Northern Luzon
    - Central Luzon
    - Northern Mindoro
    - Greater Central Philippine
    - Kalamian
    - South Mindanao (also called Bilic languages)
    - Sangiric
    - Minahasan
    - Umiray Dumaget
    - Manide–Alabat
    - Ati
    - Klata
  - Sama–Bajaw
  - North Bornean
    - Northeast Sabahan
    - Southwest Sabahan
    - North Sarawak
  - Kayan–Murik
  - Land Dayak
  - Barito (including Malagasy)
  - Moken–Moklen
  - Malayo-Chamic
    - Chamic
    - Malayic
  - Northwest Sumatra–Barrier Islands (probably including the Enggano language)
  - Rejang
  - Lampung-Komering
  - Sundanese
  - Javanese
  - Madurese
  - Bali-Sasak-Sumbawa
  - Celebic
  - South Sulawesi
  - Palauan
  - Chamorro
  - Central–Eastern Malayo-Polynesian
    - Central Malayo-Polynesian (dubious)
      - Sumba–Flores
      - Flores–Lembata
      - Selaru
      - Kei–Tanimbar
      - Aru
      - Central Maluku
      - Timoric (also called Timor–Babar languages)
      - Kowiai
      - Teor-Kur
    - Eastern Malayo-Polynesian (dubious)
      - South Halmahera–West New Guinea
      - Oceanic (approximately 450 languages)

==== Nasal ====
The position of the recently rediscovered Nasal language (spoken on Sumatra) is unclear; it shares features of lexicon and phonology with both Lampung and Rejang.

==== Enggano ====
Edwards (2015) argues that Enggano is a primary branch of Malayo-Polynesian. However, this is disputed by Smith (2017), who considers Enggano to have undergone significant internal changes, but to have once been much more like other Sumatran languages in Sumatra.

==== Philippine languages ====
The status of the Philippine languages as subgroup of Malayo-Polynesian is disputed. While many scholars (such as Robert Blust) support a genealogical subgroup that includes the languages of the Philippines and northern Sulawesi, Reid (2018) rejects the hypothesis of a single Philippine subgroup, but instead argues that the Philippine branches represent first-order subgroups directly descended from Proto-Malayo-Polynesian.

==== Nuclear Malayo-Polynesian (Zobel 2002) ====
Zobel (2002) proposes a Nuclear Malayo-Polynesian subgroup, based on putative shared innovations in the Austronesian alignment and syntax found throughout Indonesia apart from much of Borneo and the north of Sulawesi. This subgroup comprises the languages of the Greater Sunda Islands (Malayo-Chamic, Northwest Sumatra–Barrier Islands, Lampung, Sundanese, Javanese, Madurese, Bali-Sasak-Sumbawa) and most of Sulawesi (Celebic, South Sulawesi), Palauan, Chamorro and the Central–Eastern Malayo-Polynesian languages. This hypothesis is one of the few attempts to link certain Western Malayo-Polynesian languages with the Central-Eastern Malayo-Polynesian languages in a higher intermediate subgroup, but has received little further scholarly attention.

==== Malayo-Sumbawan (Adelaar 2005) ====
The Malayo-Sumbawan languages are a proposal by K. Alexander Adelaar (2005) which unites the Malayo-Chamic languages, the Bali-Sasak-Sumbawa languages, Madurese and Sundanese into a single subgroup based on phonological as well as lexical evidence.

- Malayo-Sumbawan
  - Malayo-Chamic-BSS
    - Malayic
    - Chamic
    - Bali-Sasak-Sumbawa
  - Sundanese
  - Madurese

==== Greater North Borneo (Blust 2010; Smith 2017, 2017a) ====
The Greater North Borneo hypothesis, which unites all languages spoken on Borneo except for the Barito languages together with the Malayo-Chamic languages, Rejang and Sundanese into a single subgroup, was first proposed by Blust (2010) and further elaborated by Smith (2017, 2017a).

- Greater North Borneo
  - North Borneo
    - Northeast Sabah
    - Southwest Sabah
    - North Sarawak
  - Kayan–Murik
  - Land Dayak
  - Malayo-Chamic
  - Moken (not included by Smith (2017))
  - Rejang
  - Sundanese

Because of the inclusion of Malayo-Chamic and Sundanese, the Greater North Borneo hypothesis is incompatible with Adelaar's Malayo-Sumbawan proposal. Consequently, Blust explicitly rejects Malayo-Sumbawan as a subgroup. The Greater North Borneo subgroup is based solely on lexical evidence.

==== Smith (2017) ====
Based on a proposal initially brought forward by Blust (2010) as an extension of the Greater North Borneo hypothesis, Smith (2017) unites several Malayo-Polynesian subgroups in a "Western Indonesian" group, thus greatly reducing the number of primary branches of Malayo-Polynesian:

- Malayo-Polynesian
  - Western Indonesian
    - Greater North Borneo
      - North Borneo
        - Northeast Sabah
        - Southwest Sabah
        - North Sarawak
      - Central Sarawak
      - Kayanic
      - Land Dayak
      - Malayic
      - Chamic
      - Sundanese
      - Rejang
    - Greater Barito (linkage)
      - Sama–Bajaw
      - Greater Barito (paraphyletic linkage)
    - Lampung
    - Javanese
    - Madurese
    - Bali-Sasak-Sumbawa
  - Sumatran (an extended version of Northwest Sumatra–Barrier Islands that also comprises Nasal; the question of internal subgrouping is left open by Smith)
  - Celebic
  - South Sulawesi
  - Palauan
  - Chamorro
  - Moklenic
  - Central–Eastern Malayo-Polynesian
  - Philippine (linkage) (according to Smith, "not a subgroup as much as a loosely related group of languages that may contain multiple primary branches")

==== Smith (2025) ====
Following Smith (2017), with contributions by Edwards & Grimes (to appear):

- Malayo-Polynesian
  - Chamorro
  - Palauan
  - Moklenic
  - Philippine region
    - Batanic
    - Northern Luzon
    - Central Luzon
    - Greater Central Philippine
    - Kalamianic
    - Bilic
    - Sangiric
    - Minahasan
    - Inati
  - Transitional Philippine-Bornean
    - Southwest Sabah
    - Northeast Sabah
  - Bornean region
    - North Sarawak
    - Central Sarawak
    - Kayanic
    - Land Dayak
  - Transitional Bornean-Western
    - Barito
    - Malayic
  - Western region
    - Sumatran
    - Lampungic
    - Rejang
    - Javanese
    - Madurese
    - Sasak
    - South Sulawesi
    - Balinese
  - Transitional Western-Central
    - Celebic
    - Bima-Lembata
  - Central region
    - Central Timor
    - Aru
    - Timor-Babar
  - Transitional Central-Eastern
    - Seram-Tanimbar-Bomberai
    - Banda
    - Sula-Buru
    - Ambon-Seram
  - Eastern
    - South Halmahera–West New Guinea
    - Oceanic

The Malayo-Polynesian languages except Chamorro, Palauan, and Moklenic can be classified under a "Late Malayo-Polynesian" dialect network around 3,000 BP. The position of Chamic and Bulungan, not listed in the table above, is uncertain.

== See also ==
- Austronesian peoples
- Indonesians
