= Salukat =

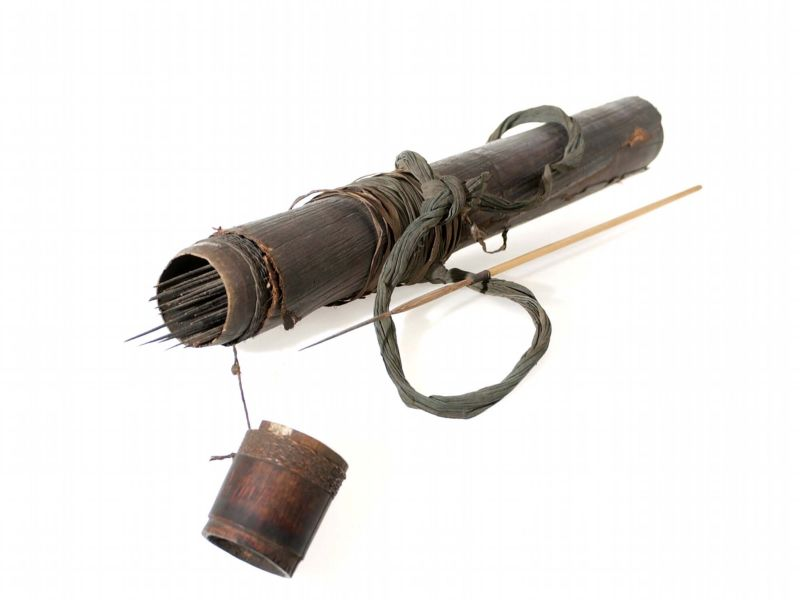
- A Salukat, pre-1883.
- Type: Quiver
- Place of origin: Indonesia (Mentawai Islands)

Service history
- Used by: Mentawai people, Sakuddei

Salukat or Saloekat is a traditional quiver of the Mentawai people originating from the Mentawai Islands, Indonesia.

== Description ==
The Salukat is a quiver made of a long segment of bamboo with a partition at the lower part and a long sharp protrusion at the tip. The arrow used are not fletched. In some cases the nock was provided by whipping two slivers of wood on opposite sides of the tail end of the shaft in such a way that they projected a short distance beyond it. The Mentawai people generally put poison on the tips of their arrows, using a mixture of omai (Antiaris toxicaria), lombok (Capsicum annisum), tuba (Derris elliptica) and baglai (Alpinia galanga). The arrow is known as logui and the anterior section of the foreshaft alone as bakulu.

== See also ==
- Tolor (quiver)
