= Architecture of Sumatra =

Sixth largest island in world

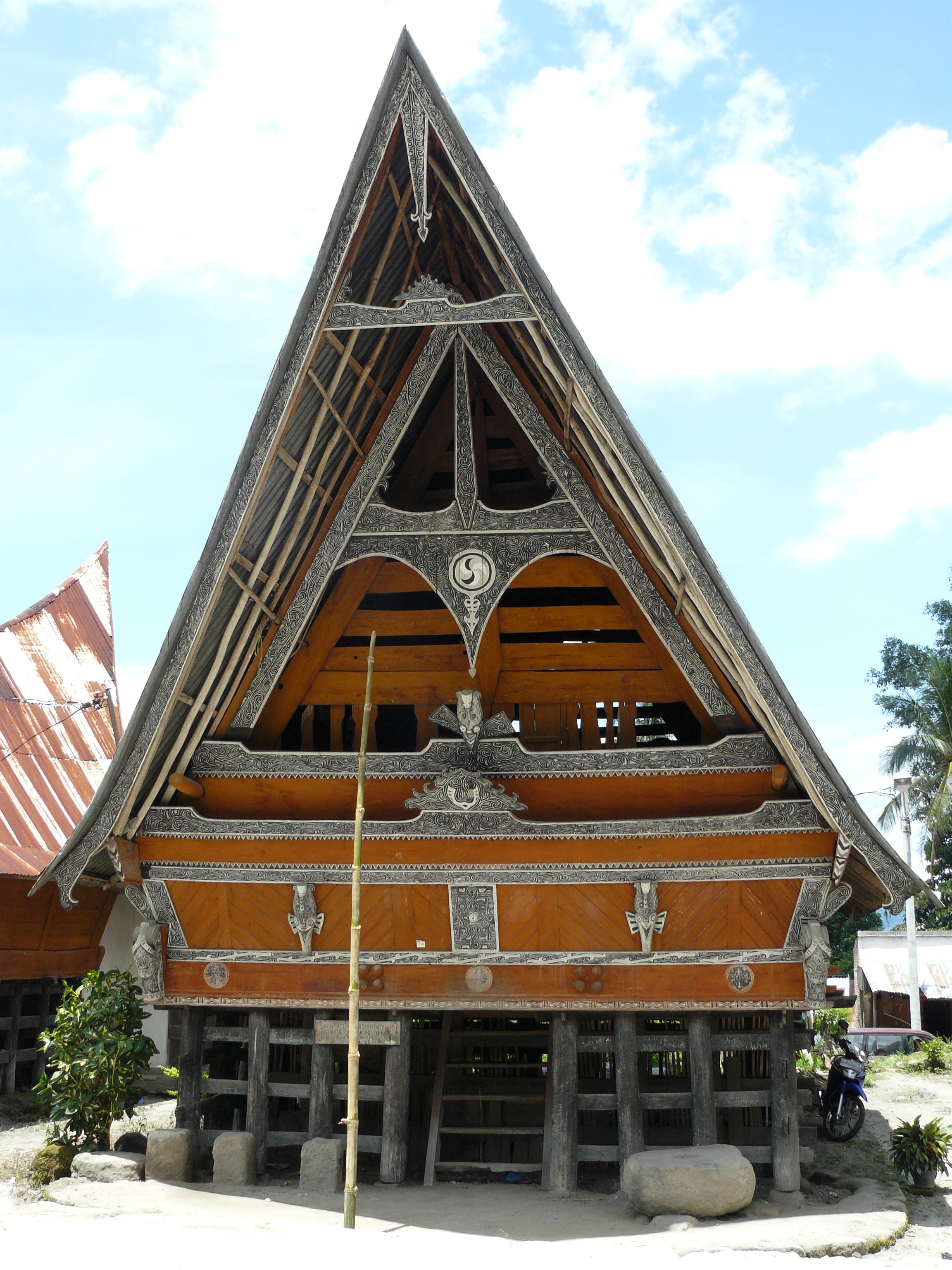
A jabu - a Toba Batak house

The Indonesian island of Sumatra is the sixth largest island in the world. The rich ethnic diversity and historical heritage in Sumatra is reflected in the range of architectural styles in the island. The vernacular style is the native Sumatran ethnic groups architecture of dwellings, while the Hindu-Buddhist architecture reflected through the cultural historical heritage of candis built in Sumatra. The third wave is Islamic architecture adopted in mosques and palace in Sumatra, especially in Aceh, North Sumatra, and Malay cultural sphere in the island.

== Vernacular architecture ==
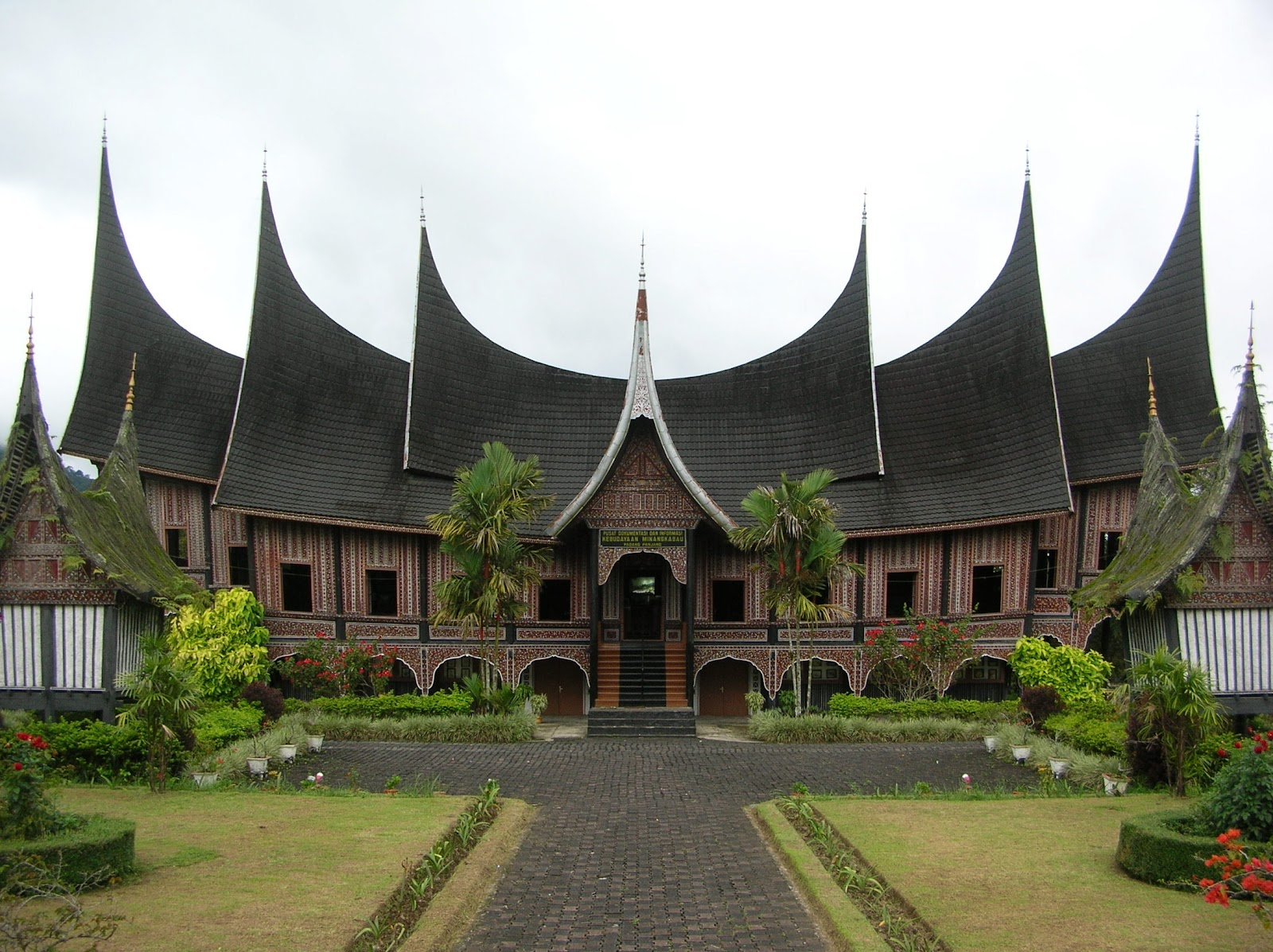
Rumah gadang, Traditional house of Minangkabau.

The traditional vernacular architecture including:

- Batak architecture
- Rumah uma from Mentawai
- Uma (Gajo house) from the Gayo district near Aceh
- Omo sebua of Nias
- Rumah Gadang of the Minangkabau
- Rumoh Aceh, the traditional vernacular houses of Aceh
- Rumah Melayu, the traditional home of the ethnic Malays from the east coast of Sumatra (Palembang, Jambi, Bengkulu, Riau, Riau archipelago, eastern North Sumatera and Aceh Tamiang Regency)
- Traditional architecture of Enggano
- Nua, the traditional houses of the Lampung area
- Lontiok House, the traditional house of Kampar Riau

== Hindu-Buddhist architecture ==
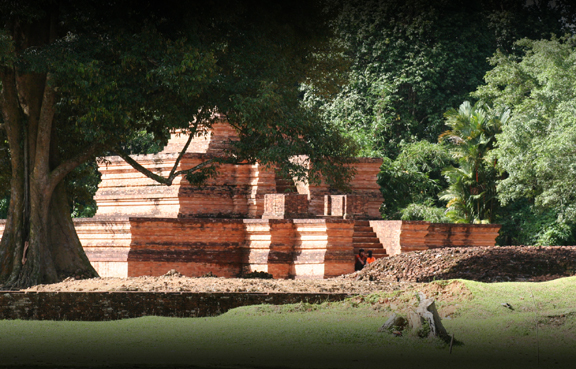
Candi Tinggi, one of the temple within Muaro Jambi temple compound.

Several Hindu-Buddhist architecture in the form of candis (temples) dated from 7th to 13th century are found scattered in Sumatra.

These temples are mostly linked to Buddhist maritime empire of Srivijaya. Although not as grand and elaborately designed as Hindu-Buddhist temples of Java, the temples of Sumatra mostly built from red brick material have their own style, these temples among other:

- Muaro Jambi Temple Compounds, Jambi
- Muara Takus temples, Riau
- Bahal temple, North Sumatra
- Angsoka temple, Palembang
- Bumi Ayu temple, Muara Enim Regency, South Sumatra

== Islamic architecture ==
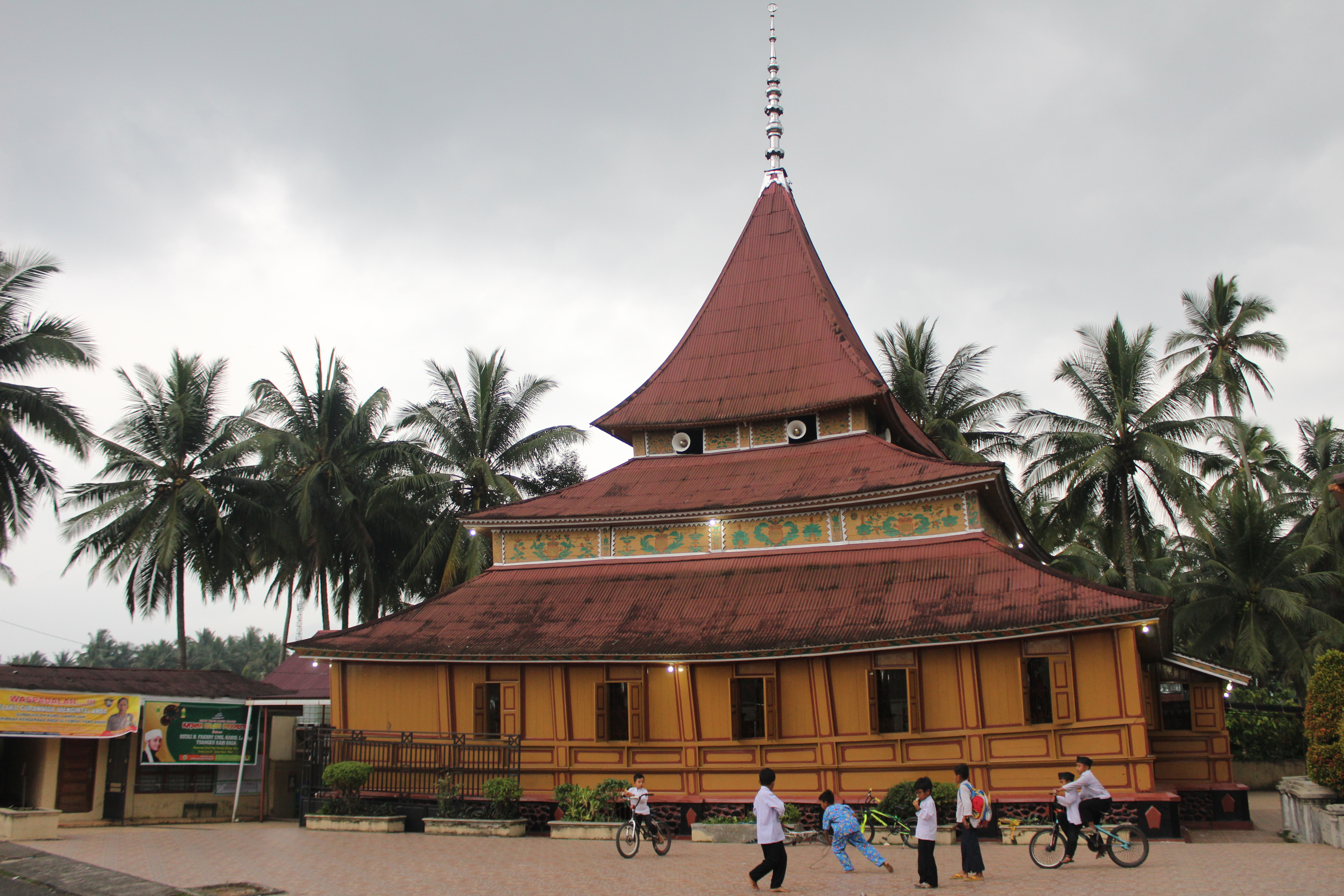
Masjid Tuo Koto in West Sumatra.

Islam reached northern Sumatra first before any other part of the archipelago. The Islamic architecture adopted in Sumatran Sultanates mosques and istanas (palaces). The most notable architecture influences are Persian and Indian Mughal architecture. Examples of Islamic architecture in Sumatra are:

- Asserayah Hasyimiyah Palace, Riau
- Baiturrahman Grand Mosque, Banda Aceh
- Medan Grand Mosque, Medan
- Maimun Palace, Medan
- Muhammadan Mosque, Padang
- Mosque and Palace complex of Penyengat Island, Riau Islands
- Palembang Grand Mosque, Palembang

== See also ==
- Batak architecture
- Architecture of Indonesia
