= Scopula nesciaroides =

Scientific classification
- Kingdom: Animalia
- Phylum: Arthropoda
- Clade: Pancrustacea
- Class: Insecta
- Order: Lepidoptera
- Family: Geometridae
- Genus: Scopula
- Species: S. nesciaroides

Binomial name
- Scopula nesciaroides Holloway, 1997

Species of geometer moth in subfamily Sterrhinae

Scopula nesciaroides is a moth of the family Geometridae. It is found on Borneo, Sumatra and Siberut Island. The habitat consists of lowland areas.

The length of the forewings is about 11 mm. Adults are fawn or straw coloured.
