= Siberut National Park =

National park in indonesia

- IUCN category II (national park)
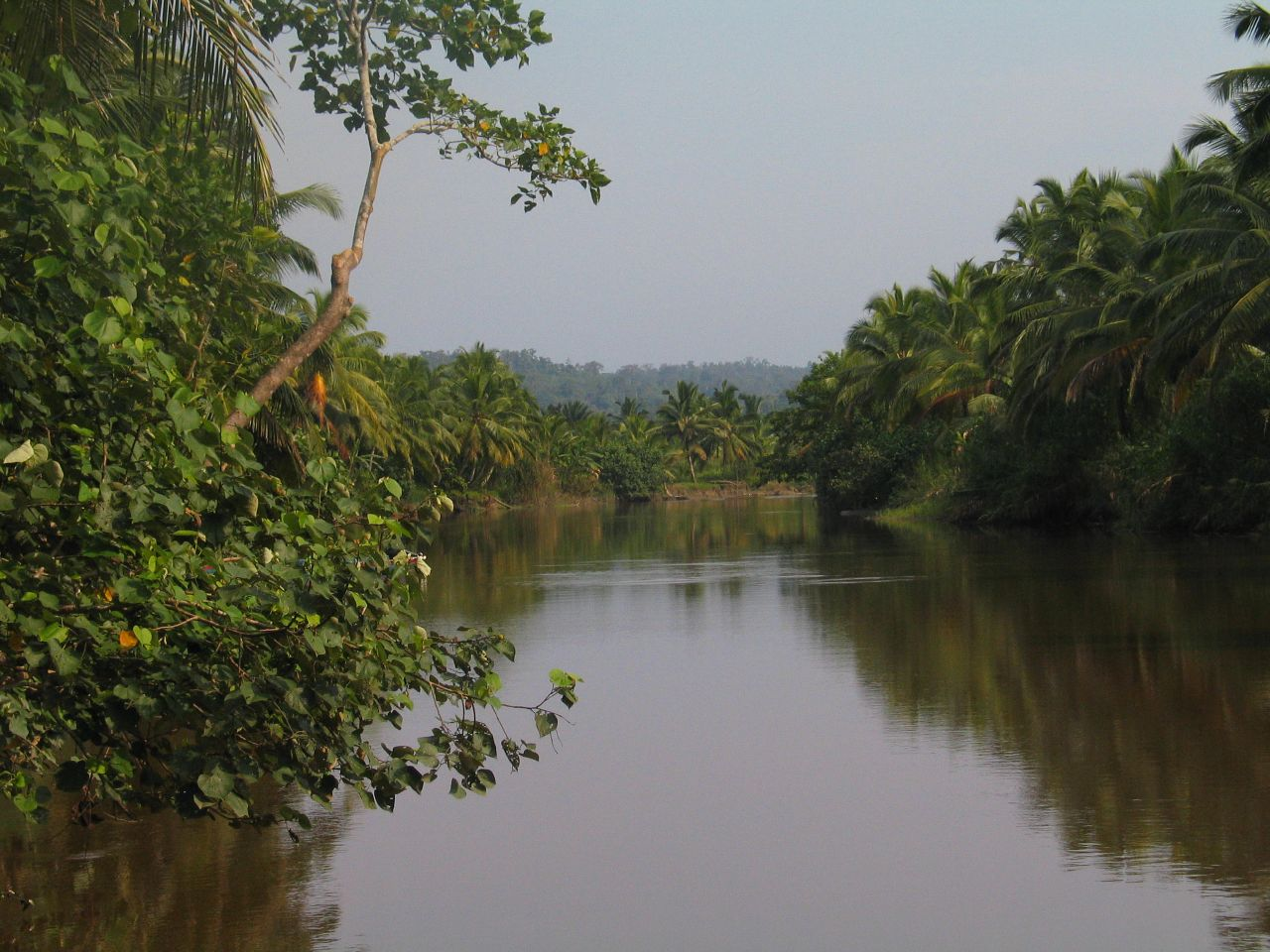
- Siberut river

- Location within Sumatra Location within Indonesia
- Location: Siberut, Indonesia
- Coordinates: 1°22′S 98°56′E
- Area: 1,905 km^{2} (736 sq mi)
- Established: 1992
- Governing body: Ministry of Forestry

Siberut National Park comprises 1,905 km^{2} (47%) of the island of Siberut in the Mentawai Islands of West Sumatra, Indonesia. It occupies most of the western half of the island, as the major settlements are generally on the east coast. The whole island including the national park is part of the World Network of Biosphere Reserves.

The notable aspects of the park are its endemic fauna, flora, and indigenous inhabitants, the Mentawai, who still live according to hunter-gather traditions. The Mentawai Islands are thought to have been isolated from mainland of Sumatra for over 500,000 years, thereby producing unique ecosystems.

== Flora and fauna ==
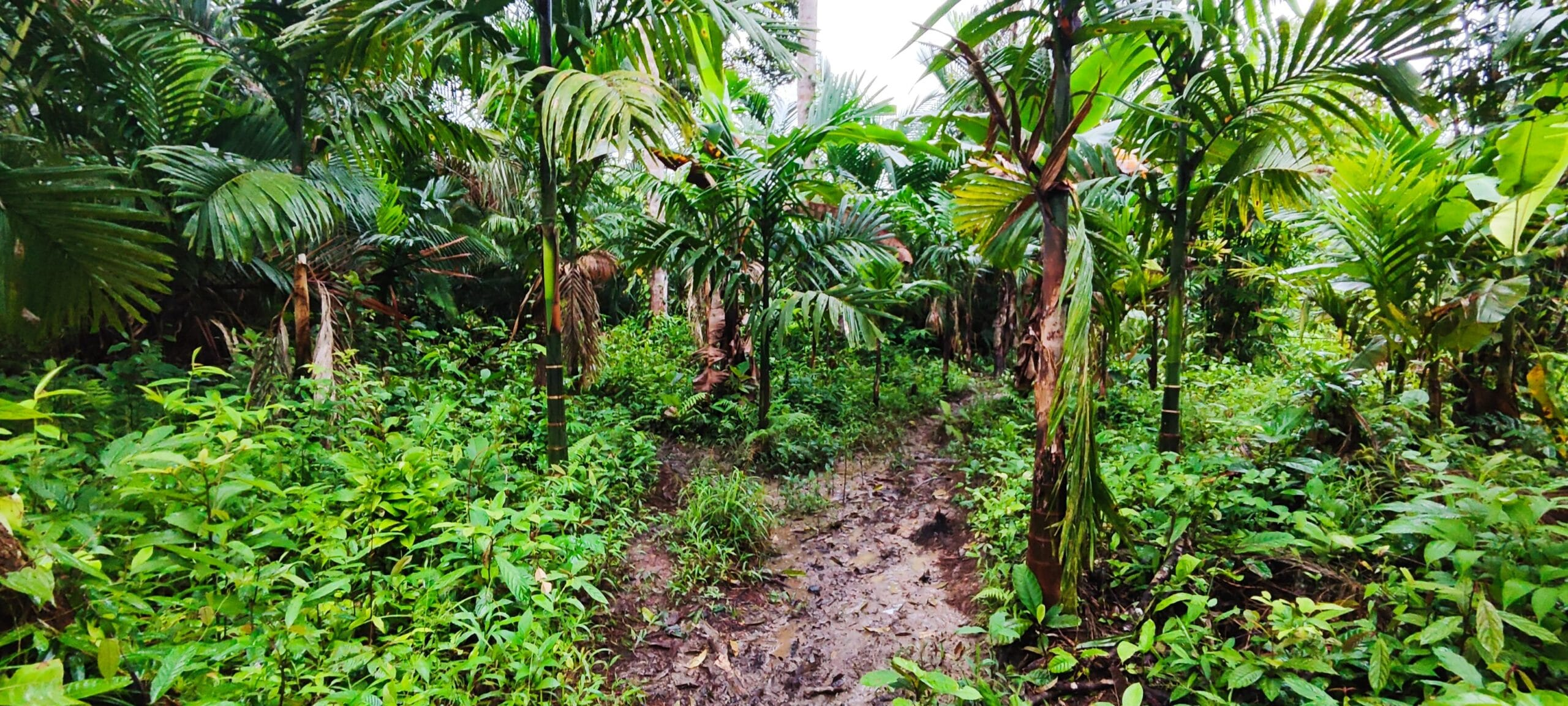
A rainforest trail inside Siberut National Park

The dominant ecosystem type is Dipterocarpaceae rainforest, but the park comprises also four other ecosystems: mixed primary forest, swamp forest, coastal forest, and mangrove forest. A total of 864 plant species have been recorded in the park.

The park protects four endangered endemic primate species: Kloss's gibbon (Hylobates klossii), Siberut macaque (Macaca siberu), Siberut langur (Presbytis potenziani ssp. siberu) and pig-tailed langur (Simias concolor ssp. siberu). Among the 31 species of mammals in the park there are four endemic species of squirrel.

The park also protects 134 species of bird of which 19 are endemic, including the Mentawai scops owl. The park has been recognised as an Important Bird Area (IBA) by BirdLife International.

== Conservation and threats ==
Protection of the island's environment started in 1976 with the creation of the 6,500 ha Teitei Batti Wildlife Refuge. In 1979 this has been expanded to 56,500 ha and upgraded to Nature Reserve status. In 1981 the whole island has been declared a biosphere reserve. In 1993 the 190,500 ha large Siberut National Park has been declared.

Logging concessions threaten 70% of the forests outside the national park, and thus endanger the entire ecosystem of the island.

== See also ==
- List of national parks of Indonesia
