= Yudas Sabaggalet =

Indonesian politician (born 1964)

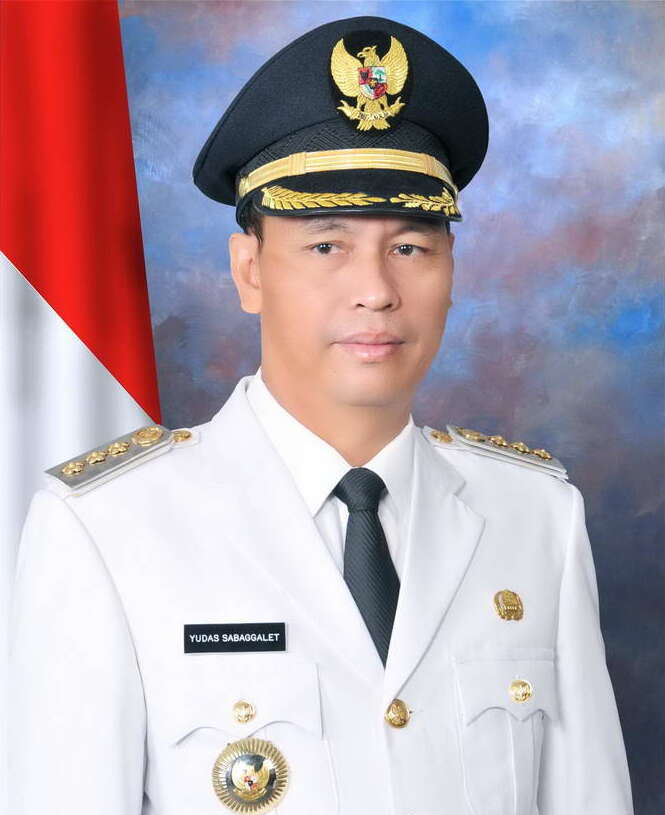
- Official portrait, 2012

Regent of Mentawai Islands Regency
- In office 5 December 2011 – 5 December 2016
- President: Susilo Bambang Yudhoyono; Joko Widodo
- Preceded by: Edison Saleleubaja
- Succeeded by: Syafrizal (acting)
- In office 22 May 2017 – 22 May 2022
- President: Joko Widodo
- Preceded by: Syafrizal (acting)
- Succeeded by: Martinus Dahlan (acting)

Personal details
- Born: 24 February 1964 (age 62) Madubak Ugai, South Siberut, Mentawai Islands Regency
- Party: PDI-P
- Education: Bung Hatta University; Andalas University
- Occupation: Politician

Yudas Sabaggalet (born 24 February 1964) is an Indonesian politician. A member of the Indonesian Democratic Party of Struggle (PDI-P), he served two terms as the regent of the Mentawai Islands Regency from 2011 to 2016 and 2017 to 2022. He served as vice regent for the regency from 2006 to 2011 and was a member of the parliament created in 1999.

== Early life and education ==
Yudas was born in Madubak Ugai, a village in South Siberut, Mentawai Islands, as the youngest of three siblings of a farmer. He lost his father when he was five years old, and spent his childhood and early education on a local elementary school. He helped his family work on the field until the third year. He then attended a private school in Muara Siberut, where he graduated in 1977.

Yudas moved to Padang and finished his junior and senior secondary education in 1985. After a year, while working in a Coca-Cola factory, he went to Universitas Bung Hatta, at West Sumatra, and got a bachelor's degree in 1994. He also went to Gadjah Mada University in 1995, but left for Bogor without finishing his education. After the 1997 Asian financial crisis, Yudas returned to West Sumatra in 1998, started politics and continued his master's degree at Andalas University until he graduated in 2005. He was a lecturer at Taman Siswa University's faculty of economy in Padang since 2001. He received a doctorate in development study from Andalas University in 2023.

== Career ==
Yudas began his political career with a Christian party called National Peace and Love Party (PDKB). He gained a seat in the Mentawai Islands Regency's parliament until 2004, when he decided to join the Indonesian Democratic Party of Struggle. In 2006, he chose to run for vice regent of Mentawai Islands as the running mate of regent Edison Saleleubaja. He then ran for office himself and won election in 2011, followed by a second term in 2017.

Several infrastructure projects were initiated by Yudas, such as the Trans-Mentawai road, Rokot Airport, and establishing Mentawai Fast ferry route services connecting the islands within the regency. Other projects also included Peipei Airport and several port construction projects proposed in 2017. To circumvent budget constraints, Yudas proposed to the Ministry of Public Works and Housing to use Indonesian Army personnel to work on the Trans-Mentawai road, which was started in 2012. By the end of his term, in 2022, only 37% of the road segments were finished. During the construction of Rokot Airport, he also proposed several names for the new facility, arguing that the name of the airport should reflect the regional characteristics. He also supported a central government plan to create a special economic zone in West Siberut in 2018.

In 2017, he sided with locals in Siberut Island, arguing that the forest permit would harm the environment. He argued that tourism should be the main sector of the regency instead, as it would preserve native culture and traditions instead of the industrial forest. In 2022, he said that the law regarding the status of West Sumatra province was not accommodating enough to native Mentawai culture and only mentioned Minangkabau culture. Yudas was accused of owning a total of twenty land plots and house assets, which he denied calling it "nonsense" after his tenure ended.

After the end of his tenure as regent, Yudas unsuccessfully ran for a seat in the West Sumatra Regional House of Representatives.

== Personal life ==
Yudas and Rosmaida Sagurung have three children together. Yudas is a Catholic, and a member of the Union of Catholic University Students of the Republic of Indonesia.
