= Palitai =

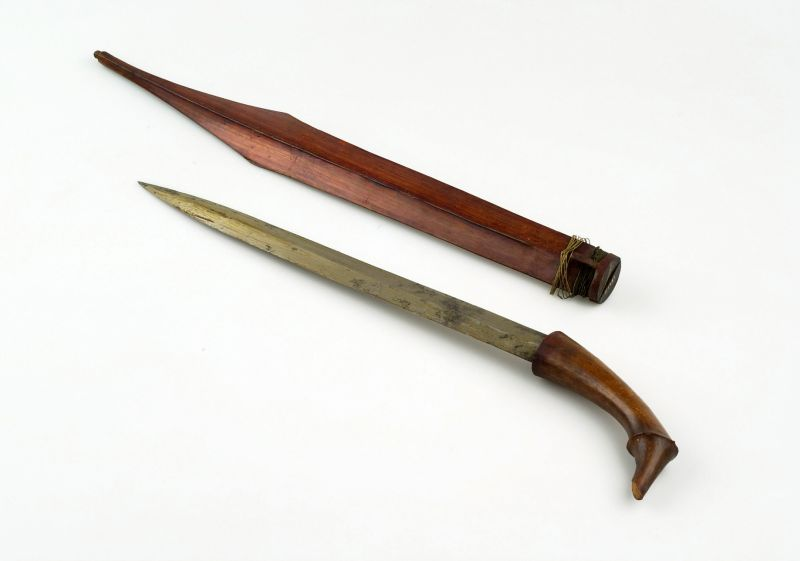
- A Palitai, pre-1893.
- Type: Knife
- Place of origin: Indonesia (Mentawai Islands)

Service history
- Used by: Mentawai people, Siberut people

Specifications
- Length: approximately 30–100 cm (12–39 in)
- Blade type: Double edged
- Hilt type: Wood
- Scabbard/sheath: Wood

Palitai (or Palite, Parittei, Pattei) is the traditional knife of the Mentawai people, originating from the Mentawai Islands off West Sumatra, Indonesia.

== Description ==
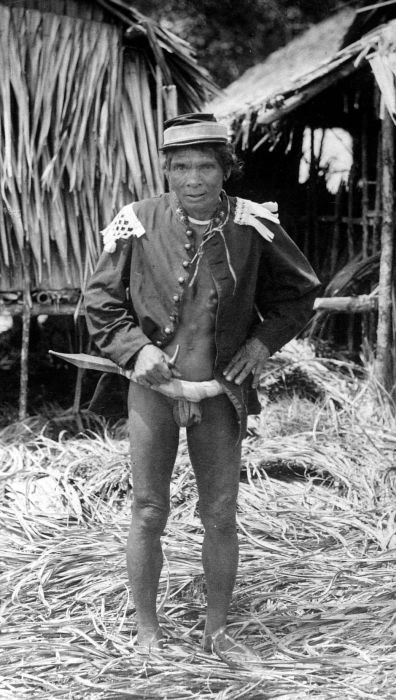
A Mentawai man seen with a traditional knife, Palitai at the waist.

The Palitai has a straight and double edged blade. The handle is uniquely long, slim and curiously curved in shape. It is a knife with a smooth blade on both edges of which are sharpened and run parallel. The edges come together at the tip to the end in a sharp point. The blade has in the middle along the entire length an elevated rib. The steel used to produce blades was imported from Sumatra, as forging was unknown on Mentawai islands. The blades were finished in the desired form on the spot. The total length may vary from .3 to 1 m (1 ft 0 in – 3 ft 3 in). The hilt of the Palitai is thin and long, at the blade still rather broad but becoming thinner to run long and elegantly into an almost sharp tip or decorated end. The hilt has a round thicker part just past half way. The Palitai is carried on the right, in the loin-cloth and may be part of the dowry.

== See also ==
- Kujang
- Keris
