= Kurabit =

Traditional shield from Indonesia

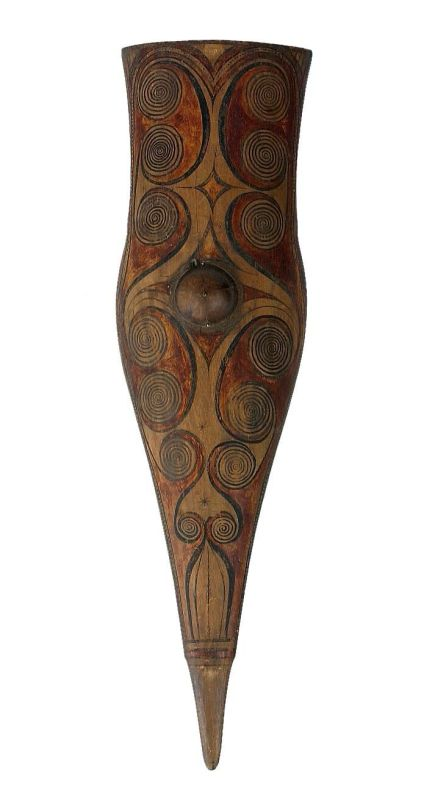
- A Kurabit, circa 1875–1925.
- Type: Shield
- Place of origin: Mentawai Islands, Indonesia

Service history
- Used by: Mentawai people

Kurabit (also Kuraibi, Koraibi or Koraibit) is a traditional shield originating from the Mentawai Islands (generally from Siberut) off the coast of West Sumatra, Indonesia.

== Description ==
The Kurabit is a long, slightly curved wooden shield. It is made of a lightweight wood and has a coconut central boss. Its straight upper side is rather broad. Looking down it, the shield becomes a little narrower and then somewhat broader until about halfway. From here it tapers towards a blunt tip. Just above the centre the grip is cut out of the shield. The subsequent holes are covered using half a coconut shell attached by means of rattan. A Kurabit is usually decorated with geometrical, coloured motifs on both sides. Spirals (patogalik) are much used. Moreover, decorations such as lizard and human figures in 'rock painting styles' are seen. To make red paint, the fruit of the kalumangan tree is used. The black paint consists of soot mixed with plant juices. Since the termination of head-hunting and of disputes between Mentawai ethnic groups at the beginning of the 20th century, the Kurabit has become very rare. The older examples seem to be less broad and less curved than more recent ones.
