= Uma (Gajo house) =

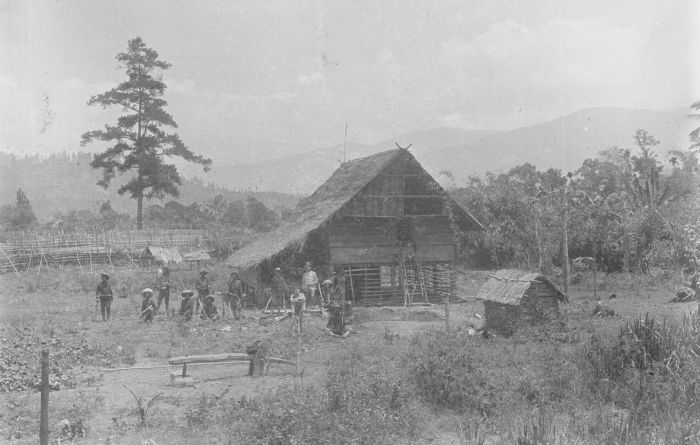
Gajo house. Image provided by Tropenmuseum of the Royal Tropical Institute (KIT)

An uma is the traditional house (rumah adat) of the Gajo district which borders Aceh on the Indonesian island of Sumatra.

Like the majority of the traditional vernacular architecture of Austronesian peoples, an uma is built on piles. It is inhabited by a number of related families and has a men's front gallery, central sleeping quarters, and a rear women's gallery.

== See also ==
- Architecture of Indonesia
- Uma longhouse
