= Traditional architecture of Enggano =

Indonesian architectural style

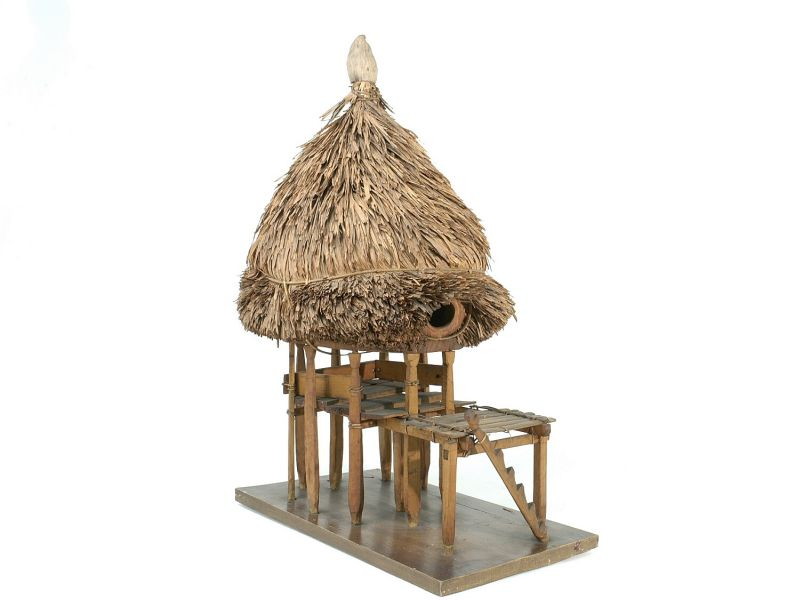
Model of a traditional beehive house from Enggano, Tropenmuseum, c. 1900

The traditional architecture of the Indonesian island of Enggano until the early 20th century consisted of unusual round beehive-shaped houses.

== Description ==
Groups of round houses about 9 metres in diameter that are built on piles formed Enggano villages. Wood or bamboo were used for walls, and roofs were thatched with woven rattan leaves. Two to four large planks of wood were tightly fastened to form a circular, disc-like floor, into which the roof rafters were sunk. The house interiors consisted of one large room surrounding a hearth. Adults slept in this main room, while children and adolescents slept in less substantial rooms and shelters. The houses were accessed via a notched wooden beam.

A kadiofe was the public meeting hall of a village. They were rectangular pile-built structures with rattan roofs and four open sides.

Unfortunately, the last of the traditional beehive houses of Enggano were likely torn down before the arrival of the Rhenish Missionary Society in 1902, and the best source for pre-20th century Engganese cultural practices are the writings of Italian anthropologist Elio Modigliani, who spent several months on the island in 1891.

== See also ==
- Architecture of Indonesia
- Architecture of Sumatra
- Vernacular architecture
