= Reimar Schefold =

- Born: February 8, 1938 (age 88)
- Known for: Cultural anthropology and sociology of Indonesia
- Scientific career
- Fields: Anthropology
- Workplaces: Leiden University

Reimar Schefold (born February 8, 1938, in Basel, Switzerland), is professor emeritus of cultural anthropology and sociology of Indonesia at Leiden University. His special interests are thematic symbolic anthropology, cultural materialism, vernacular architecture, and social change among ethnic minorities. He has lectured and written about diversity and commonality amongst the inhabitants of the islands off the coast of West Sumatra.

== Early life and education ==
He is the son of the classical archaeologist Karl Schefold, who was Professor of Archaeology at the University of Basel. His mother was Marianne (née von den Steinen) Schefold.

Reimar received his Ph.D. from the University of Basel.

== Career ==
His career has included several field studies of Indonesian communities in the Mentawai Islands. In this regard, he has researched the Mentawaians' culinary code in the Puliaijat ritual, and the anthropocentric origin myths of the Mentawaians. At least four of his other published works have also involved the people of Siberut, including religious conceptions, traditional culture, songs, and head-hunting. Having spent many years among the Sakuddei in Siberut, Schefold researched their life in the tropical rainforest, including their views on everything having a spirit that is "free to wander as it wishes".

One of his areas of specialization is vernacular architecture; with several hundred ethnic groups in Indonesia, Schefold researched their extreme variety, fundamental similarities, as well as their creative adaptation to regional circumstances and social changes. In the Encyclopedia of Vernacular Architecture of the World, Schefold describes how Mali's Dogon people use complex esoteric anthropomorphic symbolism, associating parts of the human body with their homes. In one of Schefold's books titled the "Indonesian Houses: Tradition and transformation in vernacular architecture, Volume 1", he deals elaborately with the traditional houses of Indonesians, particularly the Siberut people.

While Schefold has authored and co-authored numerous books, Framing Indonesian Realities: Essays in Symbolic Anthropology in Honour of Reimar Schefold is a 2004 compilation of essays written by others that touch upon the subjects Schefold worked on for 35 years amongst the various cultural groups of Indonesia.

He was Chairman of the Royal Netherlands Institute of Southeast Asian and Caribbean Studies, and President of the Royal Institute of Linguistics and Anthropology, Leiden.

== Personal life ==
Schefold lives in Amsterdam. He is married to anthropologist Jet Bakels. They have two children.

== Selected works ==
- (1972), Divination in Mentawai
- (1973), Religious conceptions on Siberut, Mentawai
- (1976), Religious involution : internal change and its consequences in the taboo system of the Mentawaians
- (1981), The traditional culture of Siberut
- (1982), The culinary code in the Puliaijat ritual of the Mentawaians
- (1982), Sei gut zu deiner Seele : Leben im tropischen Regenwald : das Beispiel der Sakuddei ("Be nice to your soul: life in the tropical rain forest: the example of Sakuddei")
- (1988), Indonesia in focus : ancient traditions-modern times
- (1992), The origins of the woman on the raft : on the prehistory of the Mentawaians
- (1994) Cultural anthropology, future tasks for Bijdragen, and the Indonesian Field of Anthropological Study
- (1995), Minahasa past and present : tradition and transition in an outer island region of Indonesia
- (1998), The domestication of culture; Nation-building and ethnic diversity in Indonesia
- (1999), Nature in songs, songs in nature : texts from Siberut, West Sumatra, Indonesia
- (2001), Three sources of ritual blessings in traditional Indonesian societies
- (2002), Nias : Mentawai - Enggano : diversity and commonality within an island chain in western Indonesia
- (2002), Stylistic canon, imitation and faking: Authenticity in Mentawai art in Western Indonesia
- (2003), Indonesian houses. Vol. 1 : tradition and transformation in vernacular architecture
- (2007), Ambivalent Blessings. Head-Hunting on Siberut (Mentawai) in a Comparative Southeast Asian Perspective
- (2008), Indonesian houses. Vol. 2, Survey of vernacular architecture in western Indonesia
- (2017), Toys for the Souls: Life and Art on the Mentawai Islands
