= Tolor (quiver) =

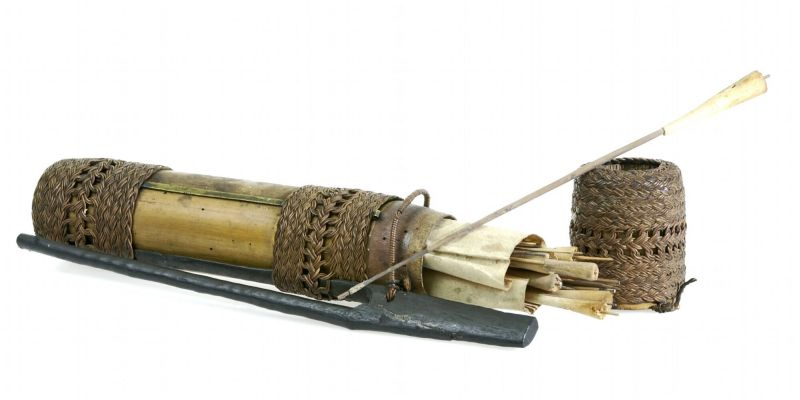
- A Tolor, pre-1887.
- Type: Quiver
- Place of origin: Borneo (Brunei, Indonesia, Malaysia)

Service history
- Used by: Dayak people

Tolor or Telenga is a traditional quiver in which the Dayak hunters carry the poisonous darts for Sumpit (blow-pipe), originating from Borneo.

== Description ==
The Tolor is made of a piece of bamboo. Among its myriad uses, bamboo makes an excellent cylindrical container. This bamboo quiver was made to carry the slender darts for a Dayak hunter's blowpipe. As these darts were often treated with plant poison, they had to be carefully protected. A partition between the segments forms the bottom. The lid is likewise made of a similar piece of which a partition forms the upper part, or is made of wood in the form of a cone or a semi-circular upper side. A wooden girdle hook is attached to the quiver by means of woven strips of rattan. The forked stick bound with plaited rattan to the base of the quiver was hooked through the hunter's belt for carrying.

== See also ==
- Salukat
