= Uma longhouse =

Mentawai Traditional Houses in the Mentawai Islands, Indonesia

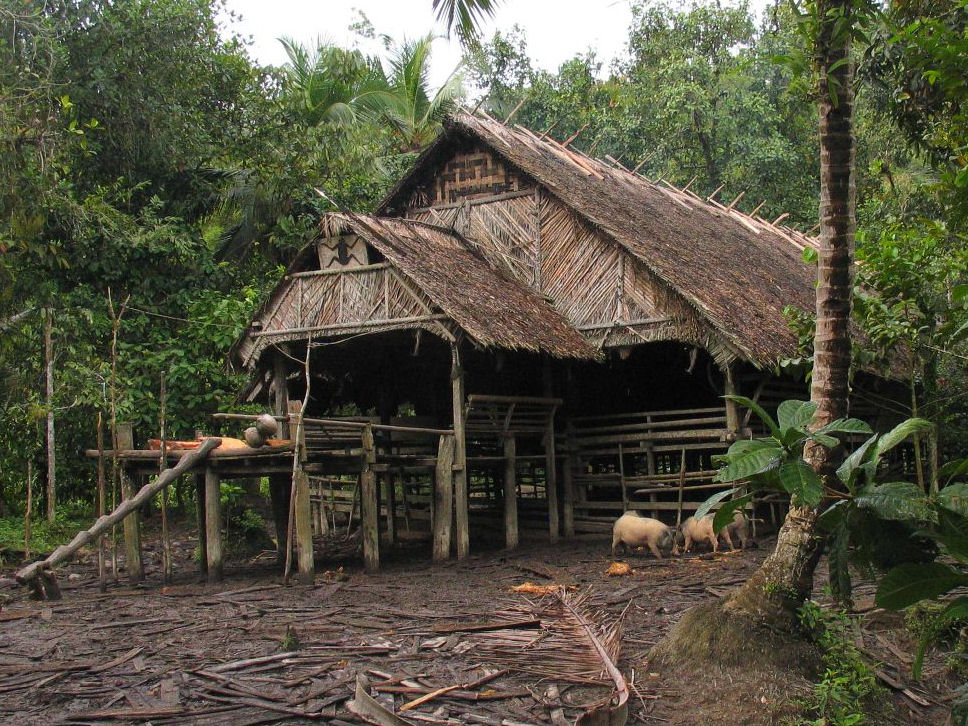
- Alternative names: Rumah Adat Uma, Rumah Panjang Uma

General information
- Status: Residences
- Type: Traditional House
- Architectural style: Indonesian
- Town or city: West Sumatra
- Country: Indonesia
- Owner: Mentawai

Uma houses are traditional vernacular houses found on the western part of the island of Siberut in Indonesia. The island is part of the Mentawai islands off the west coast of Sumatra.

The structures are influenced by the Acehnese style, built on a much larger scale. They were formerly used as uma longhouses by the Sakuddei tribe before they were forced to abandon their traditional way of life through government intervention in the 1950s and 1960s. Since then, some attempts have been made to re-establish them in their former areas of settlement. Uma longhouses are rectangular, with a verandah at each end. They can be 300 m^{2} in area. Built on piles, they traditionally have no windows. The insides are separated into different dwelling spaces by partitions with inter-connecting doors.

Villages are built alongside riverbanks and are made of one or more communal Uma longhouses and single-story family houses called lalep. Villages housed up to 300 people and the larger villages were divided into sections along patrilineal clans of families with their own uma. Rusuk were dwellings for widows and bachelors, similar to the family longhouse but without an altar. The uma is the centre of social, religious, and political life, where every village member of egalitarian Mentawai society contributes to meetings about matters affecting the community. Like many Indonesians, Mentawaians believe in a separable soul that leaves the body upon death becoming a ghost. To protect themselves from these spirits, fetish sticks are placed by the entrances of the log wall that surrounds and fortifies the village and forms a stockade for cattle.

== See also ==
- Architecture of Sumatra
- Mentawai
