= Sakuddei =

Ethnic group on Siberut, Indonesia

Sakuddei people Siberut / Sabiroet people
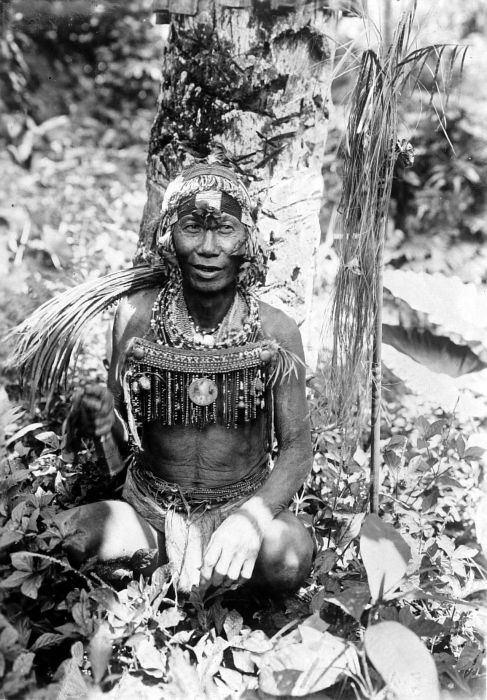
- A Sakuddei shaman (sikerei) in Siberut Island, Mentawai Islands.

Regions with significant populations
- Indonesia (Siberut Island, Mentawai Islands)

Languages
- Mentawai language, Indonesian

Religion
- Christianity 85%, Arat Sabulungan 10%, Islam 5%

Related ethnic groups
- Mentawai people

The Sakuddei or Sabiroet people are an ethnic subgroup of Mentawai people, one of at least eleven, on the island of Siberut, Indonesia. Siberut is the northernmost of the Mentawai Islands which are located 130 km (81 mi) to the west off the coast of Sumatra. The Sakuddei live in south-central Siberut in an egalitarian society, cut off from the outside world. They speak a dialect of the Malayo-Polynesian Mentawai language.

Their society has been described as classless, egalitarian, without leadership and warfare and with equality among men and women. They are described as living in peaceful harmony with their environment and with other groups. According to Bakker (2007), the Sakuddei have commonly avoided modernization campaigns by retreating into Siberut's interior.

== History ==
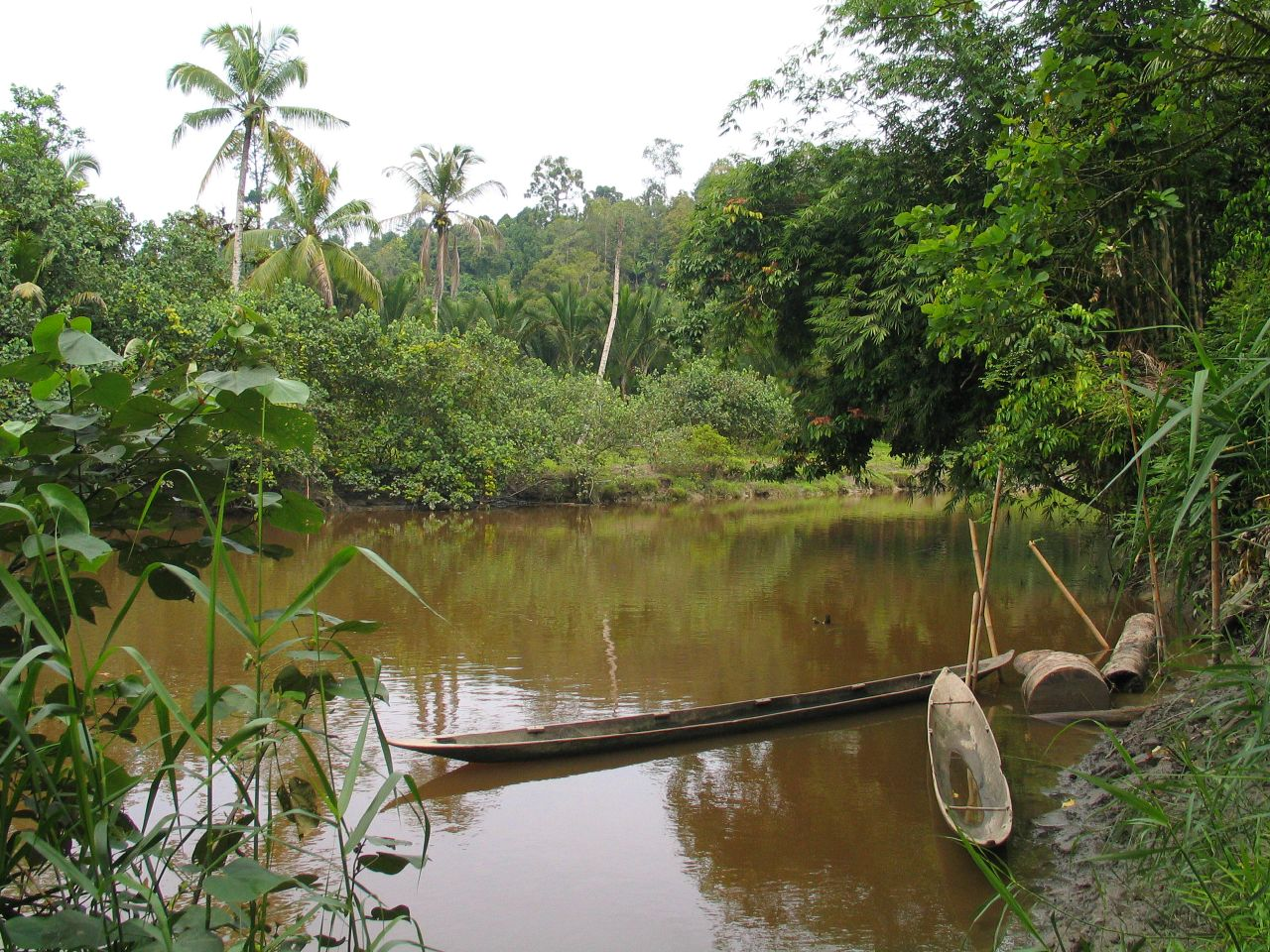
River banks where the Sakuddei reside in Siberut.

Through known history, since the missionaries started conversion of indigenous people into Christianity, the ethnographic profile of the people of Siberut has been closely observed by many anthropologists. The earliest record of the island people is by Sir Thomas Raffles, who after visiting the island in 1821, commented “I made further discoveries in these Islands, where I found a population more likable still and, if possible, still more ingenuous. If I continue in this direction, I may expect somewhere to find the "Garden of Eden", and descendants of our first parents." The first conversion of the indigenous people was started by the Italian Missionaries in 1912, though earlier efforts made from 1911 had resulted in the murder of the missionary named Reverend Mr. Lett in 1916. This is the first reported effort at elimination of the local ethnic culture of shamanism. Some Catholic priests understood the nuances of ethnic culture and adopted many of the ethnic customs such as wearing beads while offering sermons during mass. However, in 1917, J.F.K. Hansen, the Dutch Army Captain, was critical of the pagan customs of the local people and wondered how this custom could be discouraged.

In the early 1990s, plans were afoot to develop the rain forests of the Mentawai Islands where the indigenous people of Siberut, the Sakuddei, one of the few Siberut clans live, into a palm oil plantation, as a commercial proposition. The Government of Indonesia has also not been averse to this conversion since palm oil, an imported item, could be produced on a large scale locally, which would save foreign exchange and supplement the local economy of the country. The district administration at one stage, in the 1980s, had even ordered discontinuing the shamanistic rites and forcible possession of the ethnic paraphernalia of shamanism, which was later stopped. However, in recent years, with international publicity to the local ethnic people, through various media channels, the area where the Sakuddei live has attracted tourist influx, which is now identified as an economic benefit.

In spite of efforts by various international agencies to influence decision making on encroaching civilization of local ethnic groups, a Philippines timber company has been granted a logging concession in their area, which is threatening their distinctive way of life. All this is happening in spite of the area having been declared as a "Biosphere Reserve" by UNESCO, in 1981. World Wide Fund for Nature (WWF) is persisting with its conservative efforts in association with Andalas University of West Sumatra "to study and monitor socioeconomic and biotic conditions in Siberut and the rest of Mentawai".

== Culture ==
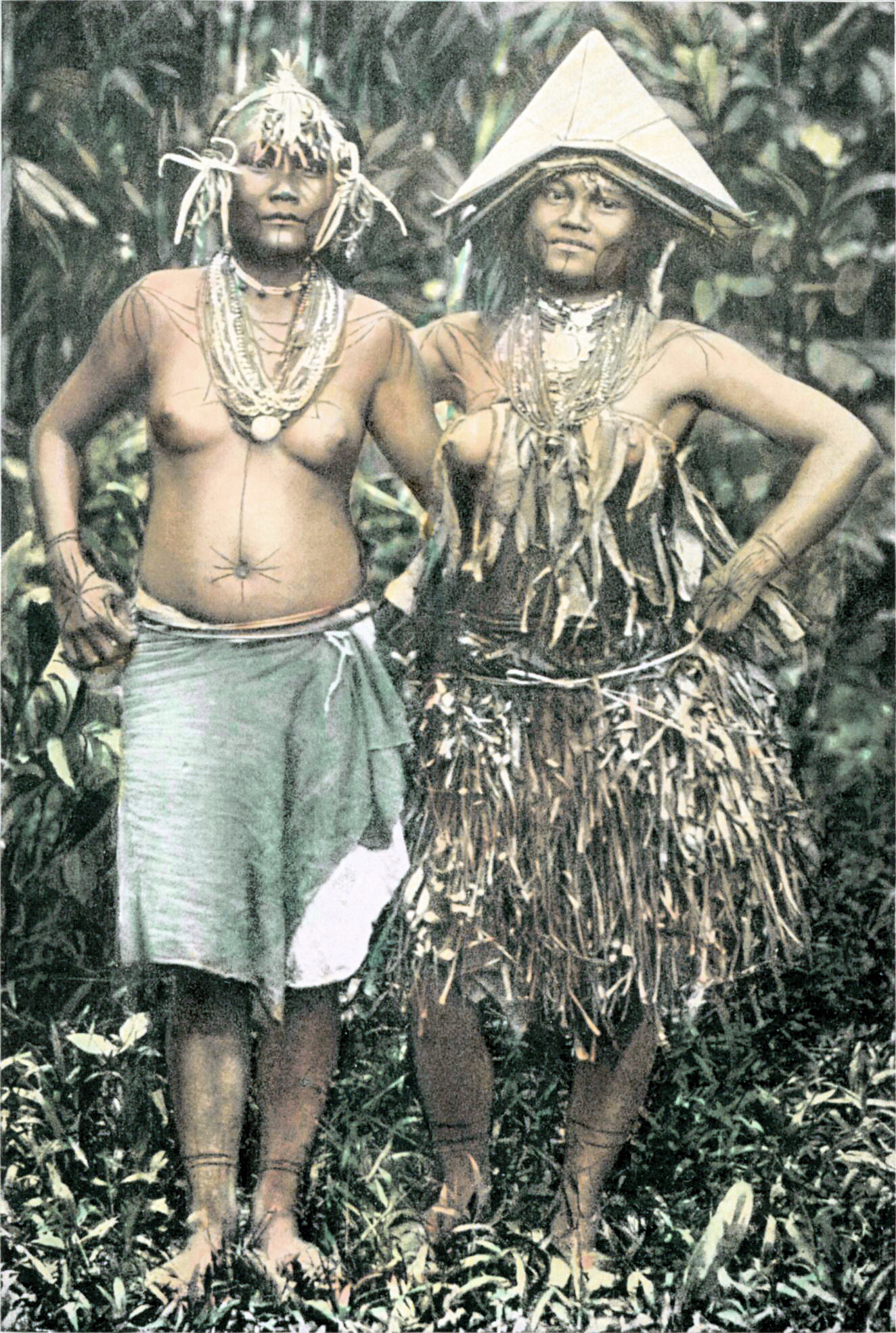
Ethnic women of Siberut with tattoo painting.

Bisht and Bankoti (2004) state that there are at least 11 culturally different communities on Siberut Island. The Leiden University anthropologist, Reimar Schefold, spent several years living on Siberut amongst the Sakuddei. According to Schefold, "Everything from people to pigs, rocks to weather, has its own spirit which is quite separate from its 'host' and is free to wander as it wishes. That's why you see that everybody has a different pattern of tattoos -- they want to make sure that their spirit can recognize the right body when it comes back from its nightly travels." However, winds of change is affecting the younger generation of Sakuddeis' clan as observed by one of their elderly leader, known as rimata, who said:

"My children are not like me. I wanted to tattoo them, and they refused. They want to be modern. If that's what they want, it's fine with me. But I like my tattoos and my loincloth. I am Mentawai until I die.

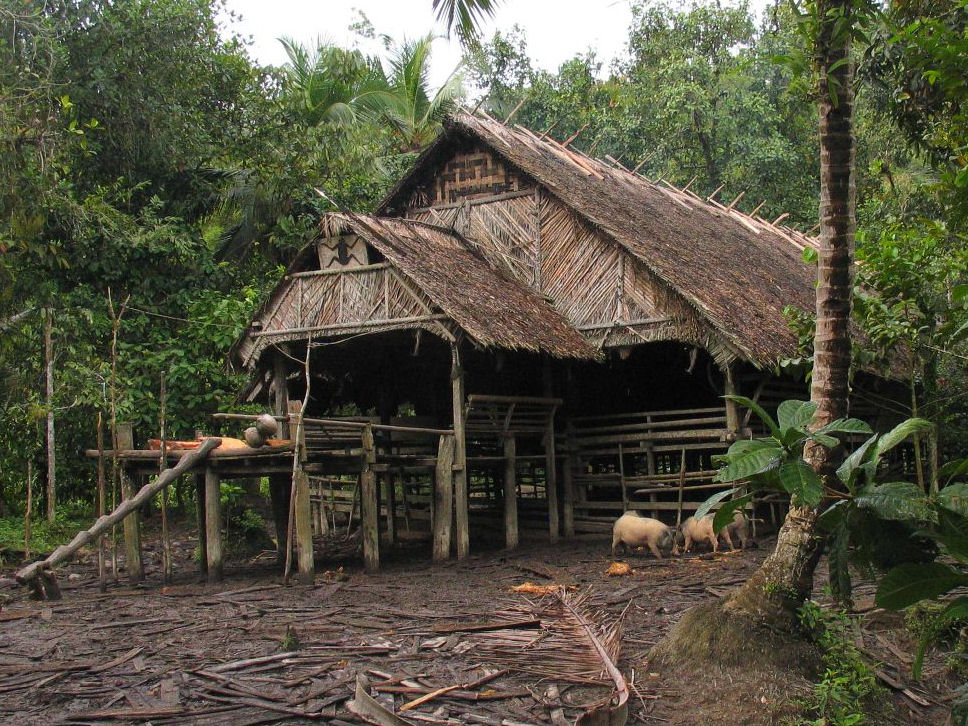
A traditional Sakuddei communal house, "uma longhouse" in Siberut.

=== Housing ===
Their traditional house, an "uma longhouse", is built on stilts. This traditional house, located along the river banks, is where formal ceremonies known as punen are held, when the entire clan assemble here. However, under normal circumstances the rimata and his immediate family reside in the uma, which are distinct from the habitats developed by the Dutch as thickly populated ghettos during their colonial rule.

Generally, the lay out plan of Uma, the building traditionally common to the people living in Siberut, has been elaborated by Reimar Schefold, as a three part structure with multiple floors. The gables slant outwards with a number of finials. It has outward sloping walls. The roof appears in the shape of a saddle and the structure is built with timber with a degree of difference between the roof and the tip. Practical and social reasons, aesthetic values, symbolic representations are the main attributes of these structures. It is also said that many a times the symbolism pervades the design of the building.

In 1980, Jowa I. Kis-Jovak noted that during adolescence, some Sakuddei boys build themselves a special house.
