= Siberut =

Island in Mentawai Islands Regency, West Sumatra Province, Indonesia

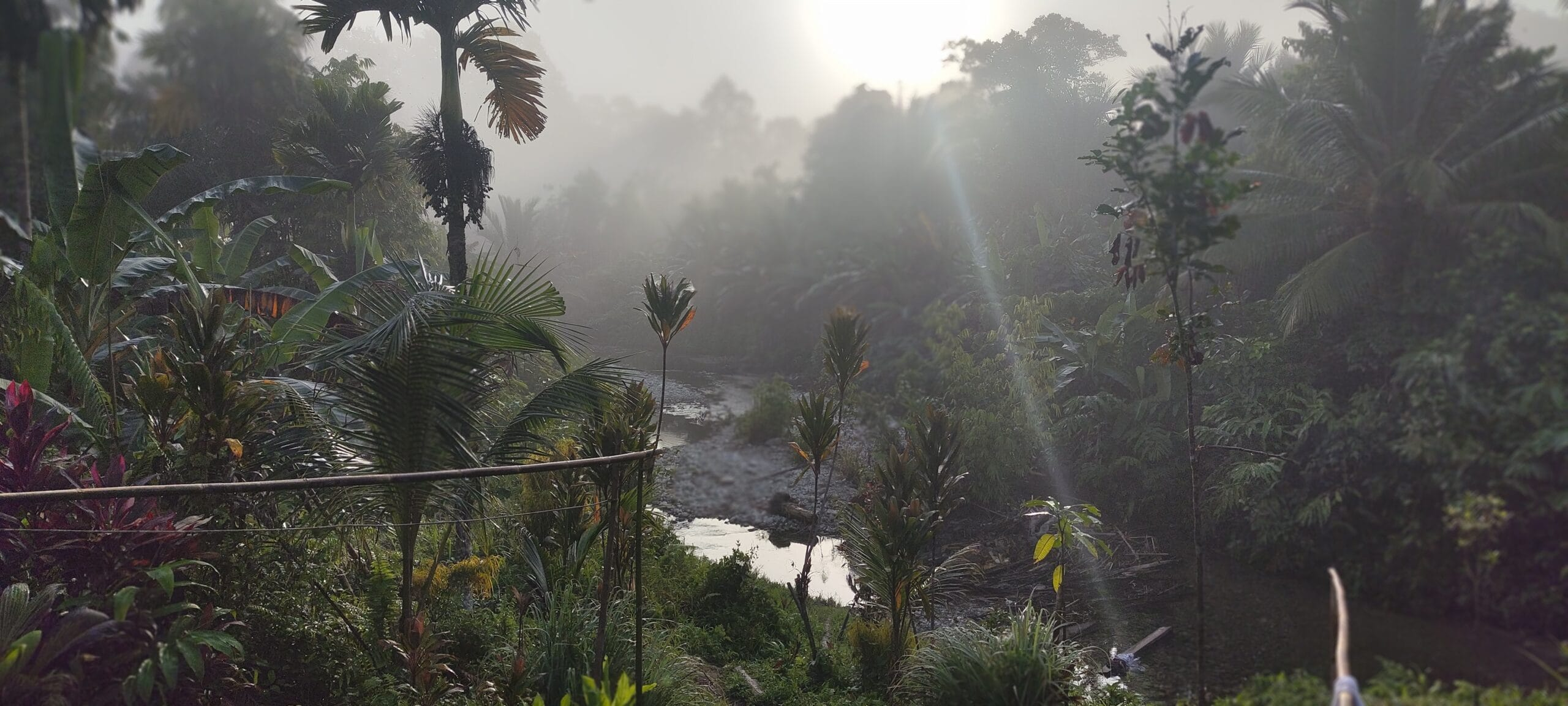
- A misty river in the Siberut rainforest at sunrise

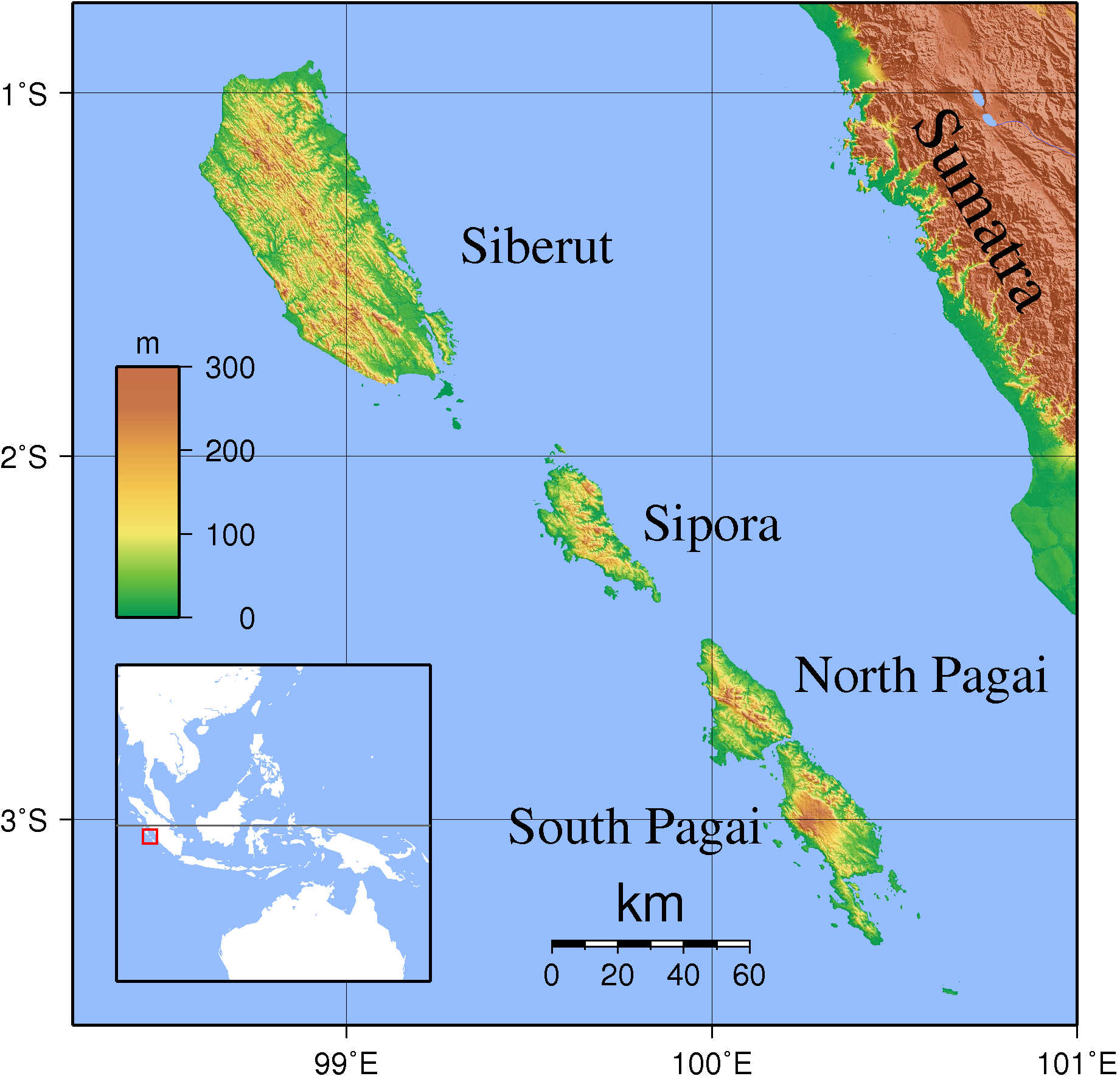

Geography
- Location: South East Asia
- Coordinates: 1°23′S 98°54′E
- Archipelago: Mentawai Islands
- Area: 3,877.9 km^{2} (1,497.3 sq mi)
- Highest elevation: 1,129 ft (344.1 m)
- Highest point: Taitaibeuleleu

Administration
- Indonesia
- Province: West Sumatra
- Regency: Mentawai Islands

Demographics
- Population: 44,834 (mid 2024 estimate)
- Pop. density: 11.56/km^{2} (29.94/sq mi)
- Ethnic groups: Mentawai. 10% of the population are from other parts of Indonesia.

Siberut (/ˌsiːbəˈruːt/ see-bə-ROOT) is the largest and northernmost of the Mentawai Islands, located 150 kilometres west of Sumatra in the Indian Ocean. It covers an area of 3,877.9 km^{2} including at least 33 smaller offshore islands, and had a population of 35,091 at the 2010 Census and 40,220 at the 2020 Census; the official estimate as at mid 2024 was 44,834. A part of Indonesia, the island is the most important home for the Mentawai people. recognized for its unique biodiversity, Siberut was designated a UNESCO Biosphere Reserve in 1981 whit in area of 403.000 hectares The western half of the island was set aside as the Siberut National Park in 1993. Much of the island is covered with rainforest, but is subject to commercial logging.

Smaller islands adjacent to the southeast coast of Siberut include Masalor, Siloinak, Karamajet and Masokut, the most southern of which lie in the Bunga Laut Strait which separates the island from Sipora to the south.

The island is known for its range of primates, including the Kloss gibbon (Hylobates klossii), pig-tailed langur (Simias concolor), Siberut langur (Presbytis siberu) and Mentawai macaque (Macaca pagensis).

Siberut was affected by the 2004 Indian Ocean earthquake tsunami, but without any known loss of human life. One report stated that the island may have been raised up to two metres by the earthquake.

== Administration ==
Siberut is administered as part of the Mentawai Islands Regency, and is divided into five of the administrative districts (kecamatan) within that regency. Southeast Siberut District (Kecamatan Siberut Barat Daya) includes the southern as well as the southeastern parts of the island; South Siberut District (Kecamatan Siberut Selatan) lies further north along the east coast, but includes the island's main town and port of Muara Siberut; Central Siberut District (Kecamatan Siberut Tengah) is further north in the middle of the east coast, while North Siberut District (Kecamatan Siberut Utara) includes much of the rest of the island's east coast; finally, West Siberut District (Kecamatan Siberut Barat) includes the north coast as well as the northern half of the west coast.

The five districts are listed below with their areas and their populations at the 2010 Census and the 2020 Census, together with the official estimates as at mid 2024. The table also includes the locations of the district administrative centres, the number of villages (all classed as rural desa) and the number of named offshore islands in each district, and its postcode.

Name of District (kecamatan)	English Name	Area in km^{2}	Pop'n 2010 Census	Pop'n 2020 Census	Pop'n mid 2024 Estimate	Admin centre	No. of villages	No. of islands	Post code
Siberut Barat Daya	Southwest Siberut	1,013.83	6,069	7,058	8,051	Pasakiat Taileleu	3 ^{(a)}	22 ^{(b)}	25393
Siberut Selatan	South Siberut	328.00	8,446	9,933	11,042	Muara Siberut	5 ^{(c)}	1 ^{(d)}	25397
Siberut Tengah	Central Siberut	589.75	6,069	7,089	7,892	Saibi Samukop	3 ^{(e)}	5 ^{(f)}	25396
Siberut Utara	North Siberut	782.68	7,774	8,337	9,325	Muara Sikabaluan	6 ^{(g)}	4 ^{(h)}	25395
Siberut Barat	West Siberut	1,163.64	6,733	7,803	8,524	Simalegi	3 ^{(i)}	1 ^{(j)}	25394
Totals		3,877.90	35,091	40,220	44,834	Tuapejat (on Sipora, not on Siberut)	20	33	

Notes: (a) Pasakiat Taileleu, Katurei and Sagulubbeg. (b) islands (pulau) of Panderai, Maseai, Logui, Libbut, Siloina, Beuasak, Sibitti, Barekai, Nyangnyang, Mainu, Botiek, Karamajat, Pananggalat Sabeu, Pananggalat Sigoiso, Koroniki, Niau, Jujuat, Takleleu, Sibokoik, Toimiang, Sikubbou and Pulau Gagaija.
(c) Madobag, Muara Siberut, Maileppet, Muntei and Matotonan. (d) Pulau Simaileppet.
(e) Saliguma, Saibi Samukop and Cipungan. (f) islands (pulau) of Panjangsaibi, Rangehrangerak, Laplap, Bugeisabeu and Bugeisigoiso.
(g) Sirilogui, Muara Sikabaluan, Mongan Poula, Sotboyak, Bojakan and Malancan. (h) islands (pulau) of Pela, Amanna, Tumbang and Langgairak.
(i) Simatalu, Simalegi and Sigapokna. (j) Pulau Simasit.

The total coastline is 1,402.68 km.

== Geography ==
Siberut Island has a hot and humid tropical rainforest climate, with an annual rainfall of 4,000 mm (157.48 in). Temperatures range from 22 to 31 °C (72–88 °F), and humidity averages 81–85%. The east coast has many islets, bays and coral reefs, and is covered with mangrove forest extending up to 2 km (1.2 mi) wide before giving way to nipah forest; most of the island's communities are situated along the east coast, with the largest being Muara Siberut in the south. The west coast features mainly Barringtonia forests and is difficult to get to because of rough seas and steep cliffs. The hilly interior elevates to 384 metres (1,260 feet), with many streams eventually forming rivers in the sago-grove lowlands and swamp forests. There are also areas of dipterocarp primary forest.

=== Biodiversity ===
Siberut has been isolated from the mainland Sunda shelf since the Middle Pleistocene. This isolation has led to a high level of biodiversity, with about 900 species of vascular plants and 31 mammal species. Sixty-five percent of mammals and fifteen percent of other animals are endemic at some taxonomic level, making Siberut unique. Of the 134 bird species found on Siberut, 19 are endemic at some taxonomic level. There are four endemic primates: the bokkoi (Macaca pagensis), lutung Mentawai/joja (Presbytis potenziani siberu), bilou (Hylobates klossii) and simakobu (Simias concolor siberu).

=== Environment ===
Siberut was recognized as a biosphere reserve in 1981. In 1993, the western part of the island was designated as a national park, covering an area of 1,905 square kilometres (736 square miles).

About 70% of the remaining forest outside the reserve is subject to logging concessions, some operative and others pending.

In 2001, UNESCO brought in a new phase of its Siberut Programme, with the intention of protecting the ecosystem through local development. This phase involves creating a partnership of local communities, conservation groups and local government, an approach which appears to be popular locally. However, poor governance and corruption has led to substantial illegal logging.

== Culture ==
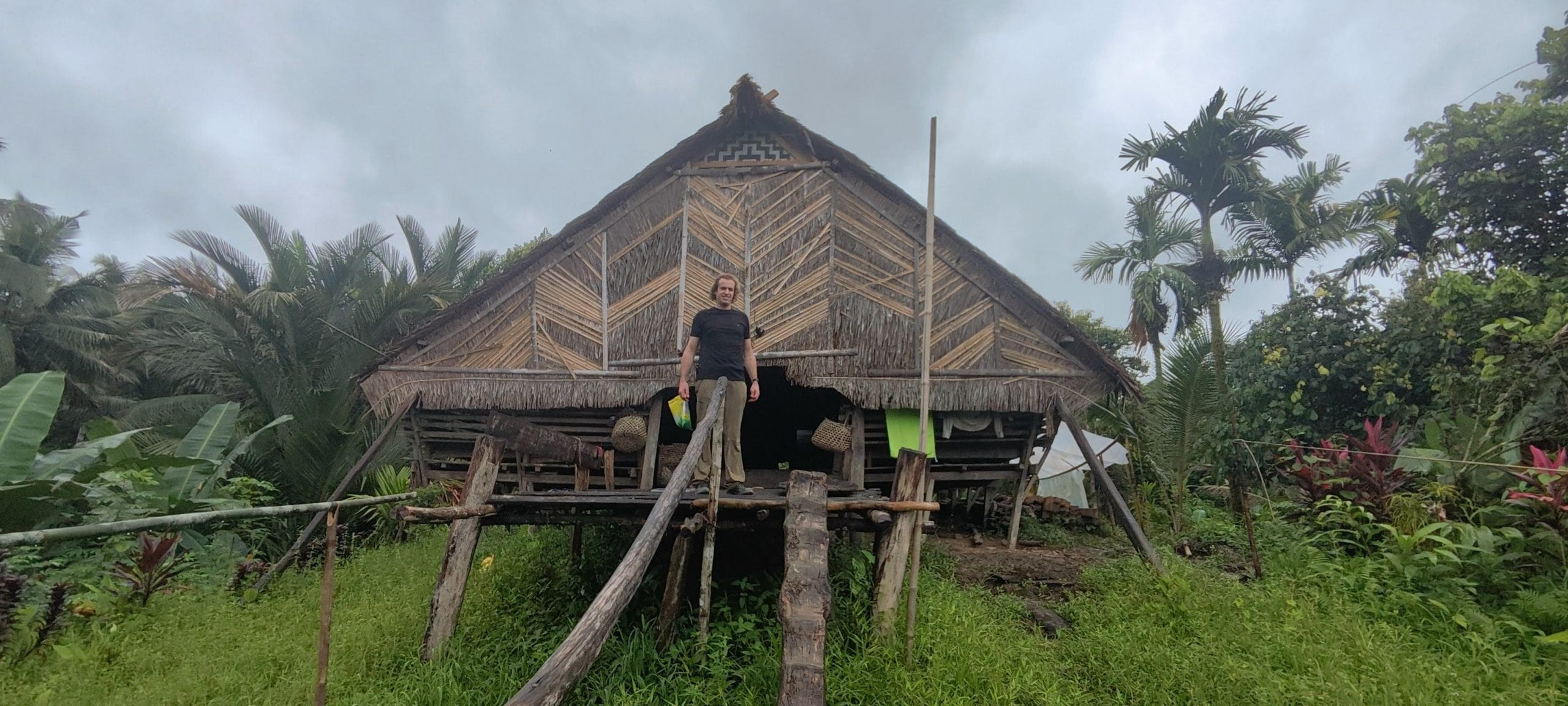
A traditional Mentawai uma (communal longhouse)

Some anthropologists believe that several thousand years ago, the Bataks of North Sumatra may have been the first to settle here. However, there are now substantial differences in culture and language among the inhabitants. The Swiss anthropologist, Reimar Schefold spent years among the Siberut groups, the Sakuddei.

The social and spiritual life of the Mentawai people revolves around uma, a communal longhouse built with traditional architecture. this culture deeply root in Arat Sabulungan, a belief system that emphasize harmony between human and nature, mediated by sikerei (traditional shamans). Siberut is also world-renowned for its ancient tattooing tradition, known as Titi, which is considered one of the oldest tattooing practices in the world.

Today, the preservation of this living heritage is centered in villages such as Muntei, Madobag, and Matotonan in South Siberut. These communities have developed sustainable cultural tourism initiatives, allowing visitors to experience Mentawai traditions while supporting local conservation efforts.
