= Mentawai people =

Ethnic group in Indonesia

Mentawai people Mantawai / Mentawei / Mentawi
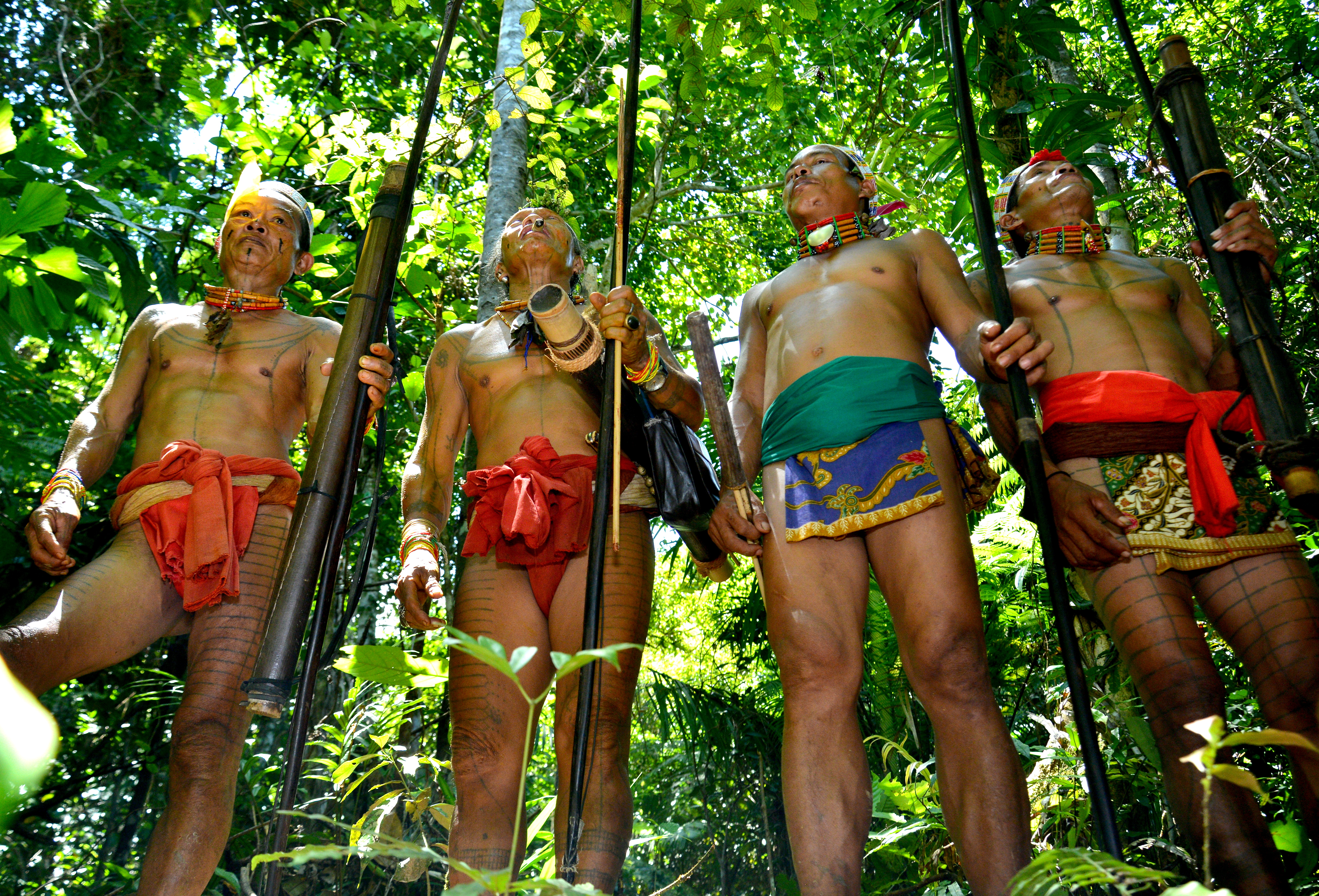
- Mentawai traditional healers, 2017.

Total population
- 64,000

Regions with significant populations
- Indonesia (Mentawai Islands, West Sumatra)

Languages
- Mentawai language, Indonesian

Related ethnic groups
- Austronesian peoples Sakuddei · Enggano · Nias · Batak

The Mentawai (Note: /ˌmɛntəˈwaɪ/ MEN-tə-WYE) (also known as Mantawai, Mentawei and Mentawi) people are the Austronesian people of the Mentawai Islands (principally Siberut, Sipura, North Pagai and South Pagai) about 100 miles from West Sumatra province, Indonesia. They live a semi-nomadic hunter-gatherer lifestyle in the coastal and rainforest environments of the islands and are also one of the oldest tribes in Indonesia. The Mentawai population is estimated to be about 64,000.

The Mentawai tribe is documented to have migrated from Nias – a northern island – to the Mentawai islands, living in an isolated life for centuries until they encountered the Dutch in 1621. The ancestors of the indigenous Mentawai people are believed to have first migrated to the region somewhere between 2000 and 500 BCE. The Mentawai language belongs to the Austronesian language family. They follow their own animist belief system called Arat Sabulungan, that links the supernatural powers of ancestral spirits to the ecology of the rainforest. When the spirits are not treated well or forgotten, they might bring bad luck like illnesses and haunt those who forgot them. Mentawai also have very strong belief towards objects they think are holy. The people are characterized by their heavy spirituality, body art and their tendency to sharpen their teeth, a cultural practice tied to Mentawai beauty ideals.

== Demographics ==
The Mentawai population is estimated at around 64,000. The Mentawai people are documented as having migrated from Nias—an island in the north—to the Mentawai archipelago, living in isolation for centuries until their discovery by the Dutch in 1621. The Mentawai language belongs to the Austronesian language family.

== Religion ==
Before Christianity, the Mentawai people followed their own beliefs called Arat Sabulungan. This is an animist belief in which everything has a spirit and soul. When spirits are not treated well or forgotten, they may bring bad luck such as illness and haunt those who forget them. Mentawai also have a very strong belief in objects they consider sacred.

The Mentawai people are characterized by their strong spirituality, body art, and their penchant for honing their teeth, a practice they believe enhances beauty. Mentawai tend to live in harmony and peace with the natural world around them because they believe that all objects in nature possess some kind of spiritual essence.

However, many modern Mentawai people have adopted other religions, particularly several branches of Christianity as well as some Islam, while others follow the traditional Mentawai religion of Arat Sabulungan. One of the local churches for the Mentawai people is the Mentawai Protestant Christian Church (GKPM), founded on July 6, 1916, and has a congregation of approximately 35,000 people.

== Culture and lifestyle ==
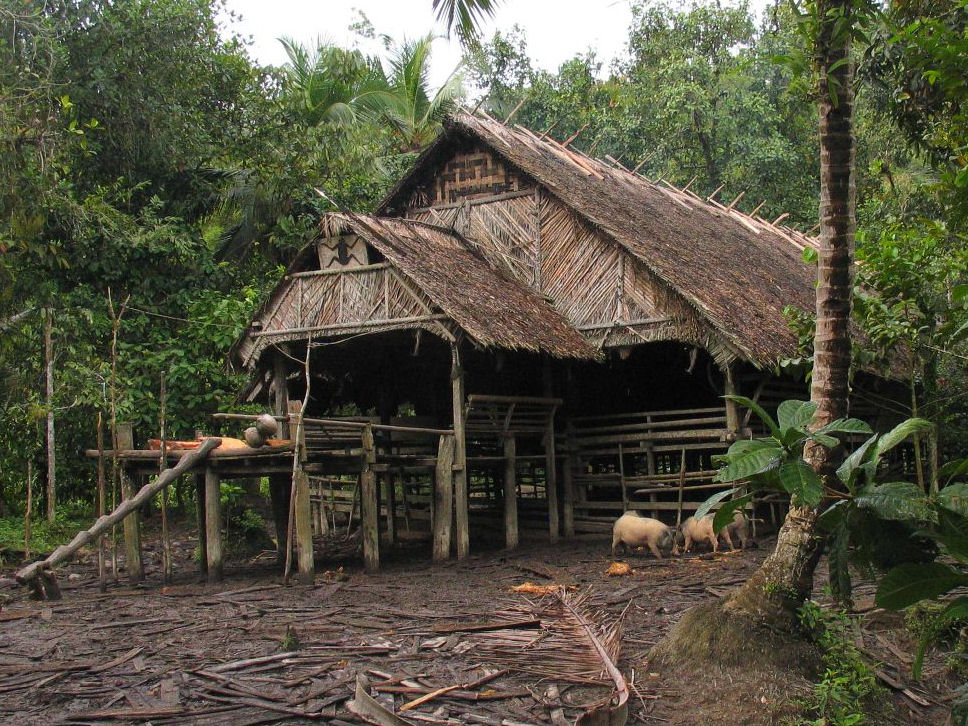
An Uma, the traditional communal house of the Mentawai

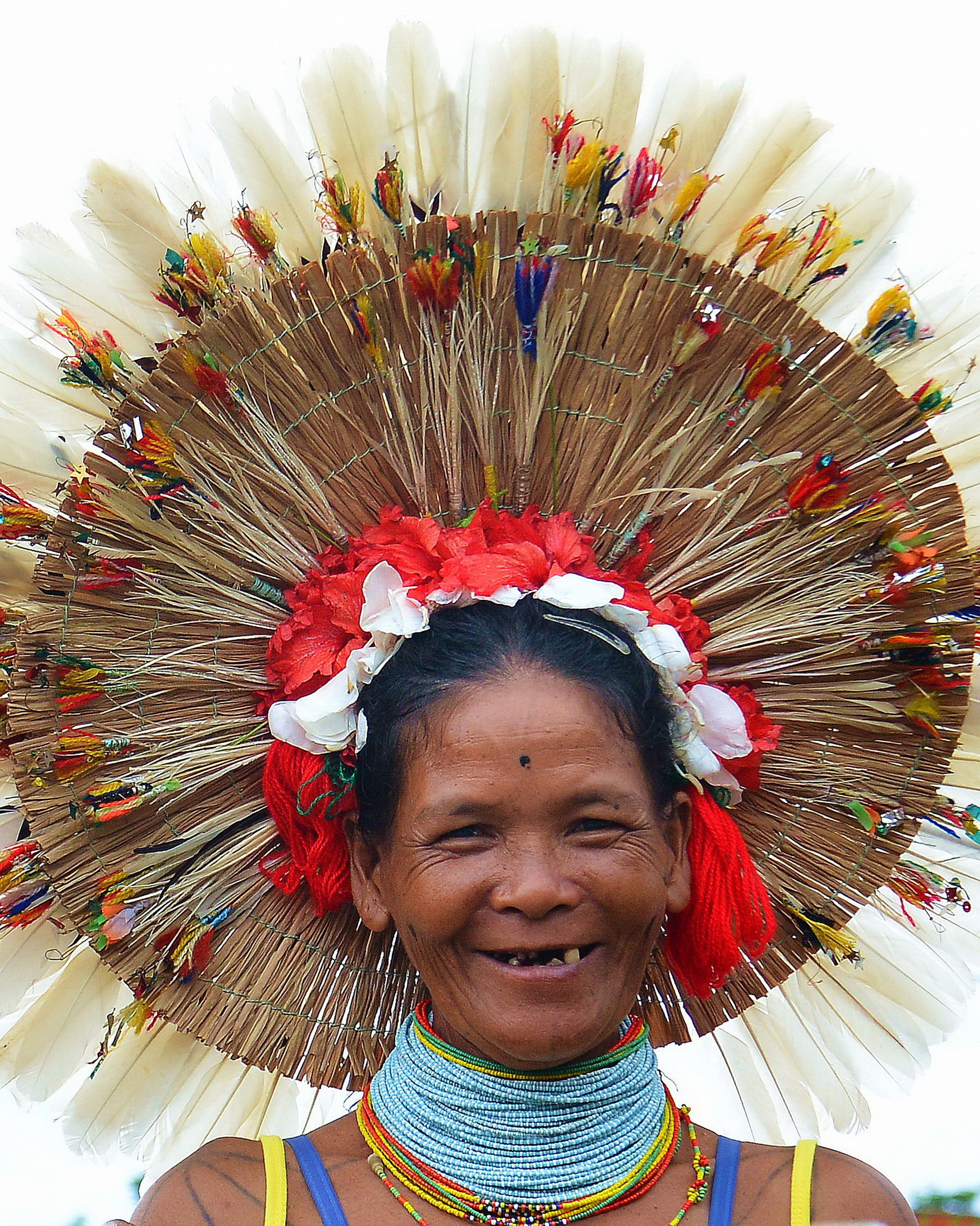
A Mentawai woman, 2017

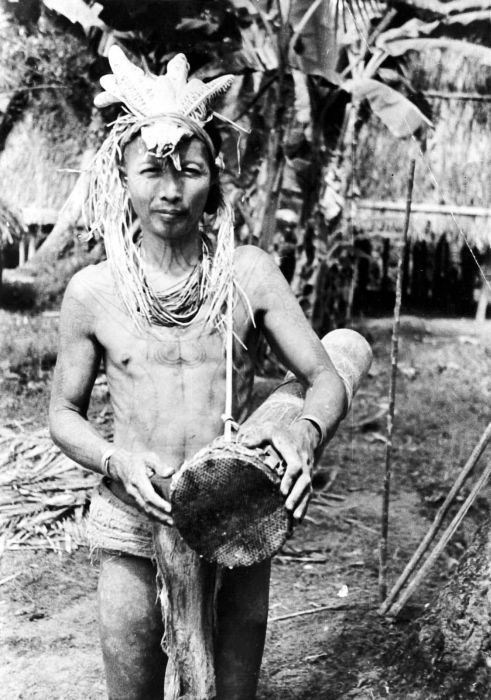
Man with drum in the Mentawai Islands.

The Mentawai live in the traditional dwelling called the Uma which is a longhouse and is made by weaving bamboo strips together to make walls and thatching the roofs with grass, the floor is raised on stilts and is made of wood planks. Each Uma is decorated with skulls of the various animals they hunted. An Uma can house three to four families. A Lalep is a smaller house containing only one family; and a Rusuk is a home for widows and bachelors.

The main clothing for men is a loin cloth made from the bark of a gum tree. Mentawai adorn themselves with necklaces and flowers in their hair and ears. Women wear a cloth wound around the waist and small sleeveless vests made from palm or banana leaves. Mentawai sharpen their teeth with a chisel for aesthetic reasons.

It is very common to see Mentawai people covered head to toe in tattoos, since they follow various traditional tribal rituals and their tattoos identify their role and social status. The tradition of tattooing called Titi, is done with cane and coconut charcoal dye, a nail, a needle, and two pieces of wood fashioned into a hammer-like stick by a shaman called Sikerei. The shaman will pray for the charcoal before using it to make a tattoo. Tattooing on the island is an identity and a personal or communal reflection of the people's relationship to nature, called Arat Sabulungan, although there are motivational and design differences from region to region and among clans. Mentawai people believe that these tattoos allow them to bring their material wealth into the afterlife and allows their ancestors to recognize them in the afterlife. Moreover, Mentawai tattoos are considered one of the oldest in the world, and symbolize the balance between foresters and nature.

The Mentawai's traditional religion is Arat Sabulungan. This belief system gives reverence to the spirits of their ancestors, the sky, land, ocean, rivers, and all that is natural within. It also provides local people with the skills, knowledge, and values required to maintain a self-sufficient and sustainable lifestyle. Local shaman, known as Sikerei, act as teachers, healers and caretakers within the Arat Sabulungan belief system. Largely due to the gradual introduction and influence of foreign cultural, behavioral and ideological change, the number of Sikerei still practicing the Arat Sabulungan lifestyle and their role has diminished to a few small clans located in the south of Siberut island.

The traditional knife of the Mentawai people is called Palitai, while their traditional shield is called Kurabit.

Men hunt warthogs, chicken, deer, and primates. Dogs are usually used to spot the animals during hunting, then the prey is shot with a bow and poisonous arrow. The poison comes from a local leaf which has been mashed and mixed with water. Women and children gather wild yams and other wild food and fruits. The main food they eat is sago, a type of flour from ground palm medulla, which is usually grilled. Small animals are hunted by women. The Mentawai people keep pigs, dogs, monkeys, and sometimes chickens as pets.

During the pre-independence era, the cultural influence of foreign colonials and other islanders had systematically displaced or obliterated indigenous customs and religions. In postcolonial times, the Indonesian government continued this policy with a 1954 decree that prohibited animist religions, effectively abolishing tattooing and other customs. In the 1950s, the government began introducing development programs designed to integrate the Mentawai into mainstream society. While this policy may have sought to encourage social unification, in practice, it resulted in the suppression of the Mentawai's Arat Sabulungan. In extreme cases, state policy led to the burning and destruction of cultural paraphernalia used for ritual and ceremonial purposes. Moreover, Mentawai shamans, the Sikerei, were forcibly imprisoned or disrobed and removed from the forest.

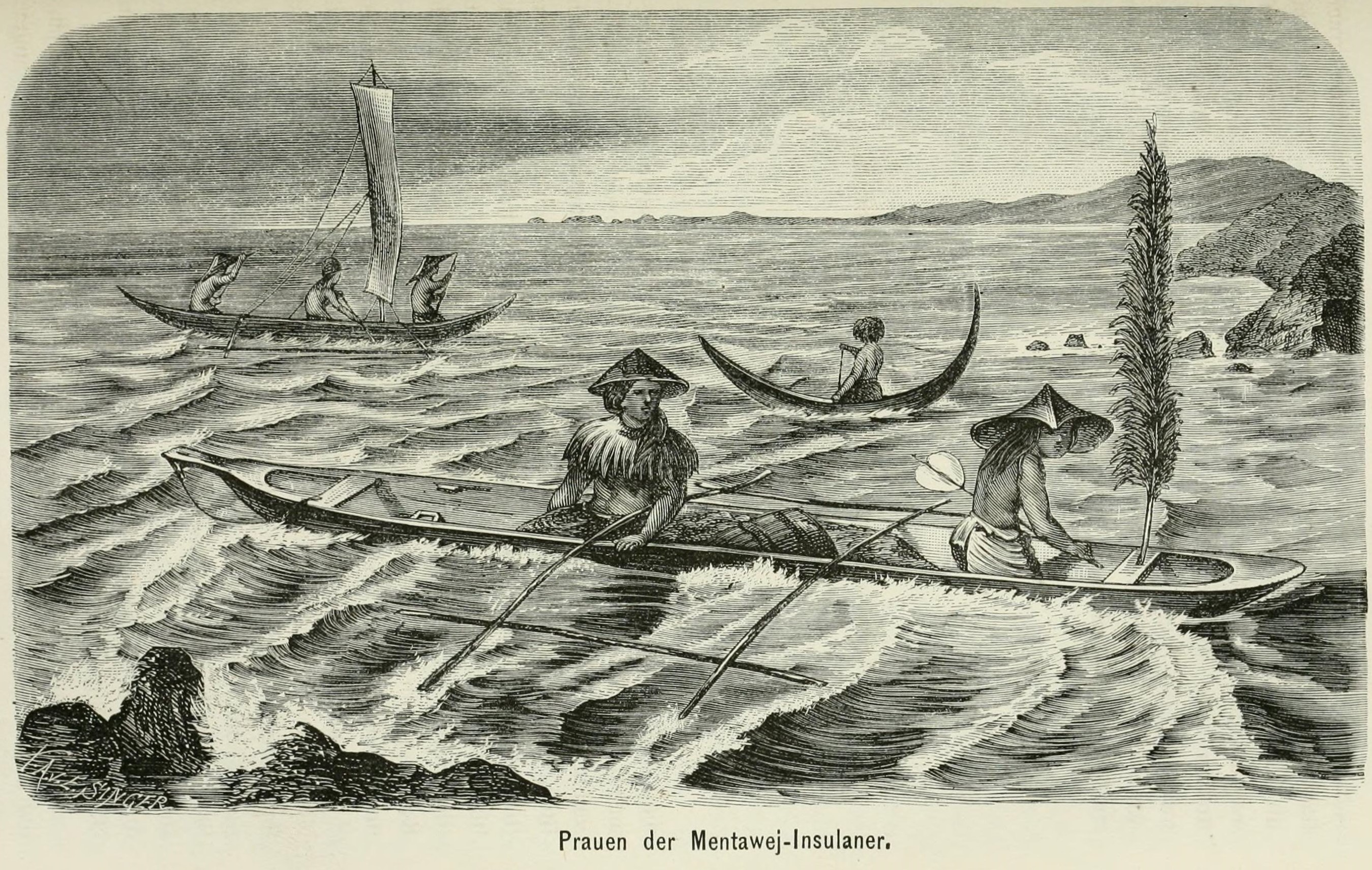
Prahus of Mentawai islander.

Due to modernization, the Mentawai people have experienced some significant change in their day-to-day lives and culture. With the introduction of Pancasila and transmigration, the majority of the Mentawai increasingly lost connection with their ancestral ways. Traditionally, the Mentawai live in family units centered upon a longhouse or uma, which are dispersed throughout the jungle. Government settlements now concentrate multiple families within a single area. Livestock, including pigs, which are the lifeblood and economy of Mentawai society, are banished from these same reserves due to introduced social policy. Moreover, the number of Mentawai people still actively practicing cultural customs has been reduced to only 1 percent of the population, isolated to the south of Siberut. Under Pancasila, the five principles for Indonesian state philosophy formulated by the Indonesian nationalist leader Sukarno, the Indonesian Government also began to enforce their new nationwide religious policies issuing a decree declaring that all Indonesian people must belong to one of the five recognized religions (Islam, Protestantism, Catholicism, Hinduism, and Buddhism). For the Mentawai Islands, this resulted in an immediate influx of missionaries and an increase in violence and pressure on the people to adopt change. Mentawai people are also facing a challenge in their day-to-day learning. In the government-sponsored schools, Mentawai children are encouraged to speak Indonesian.

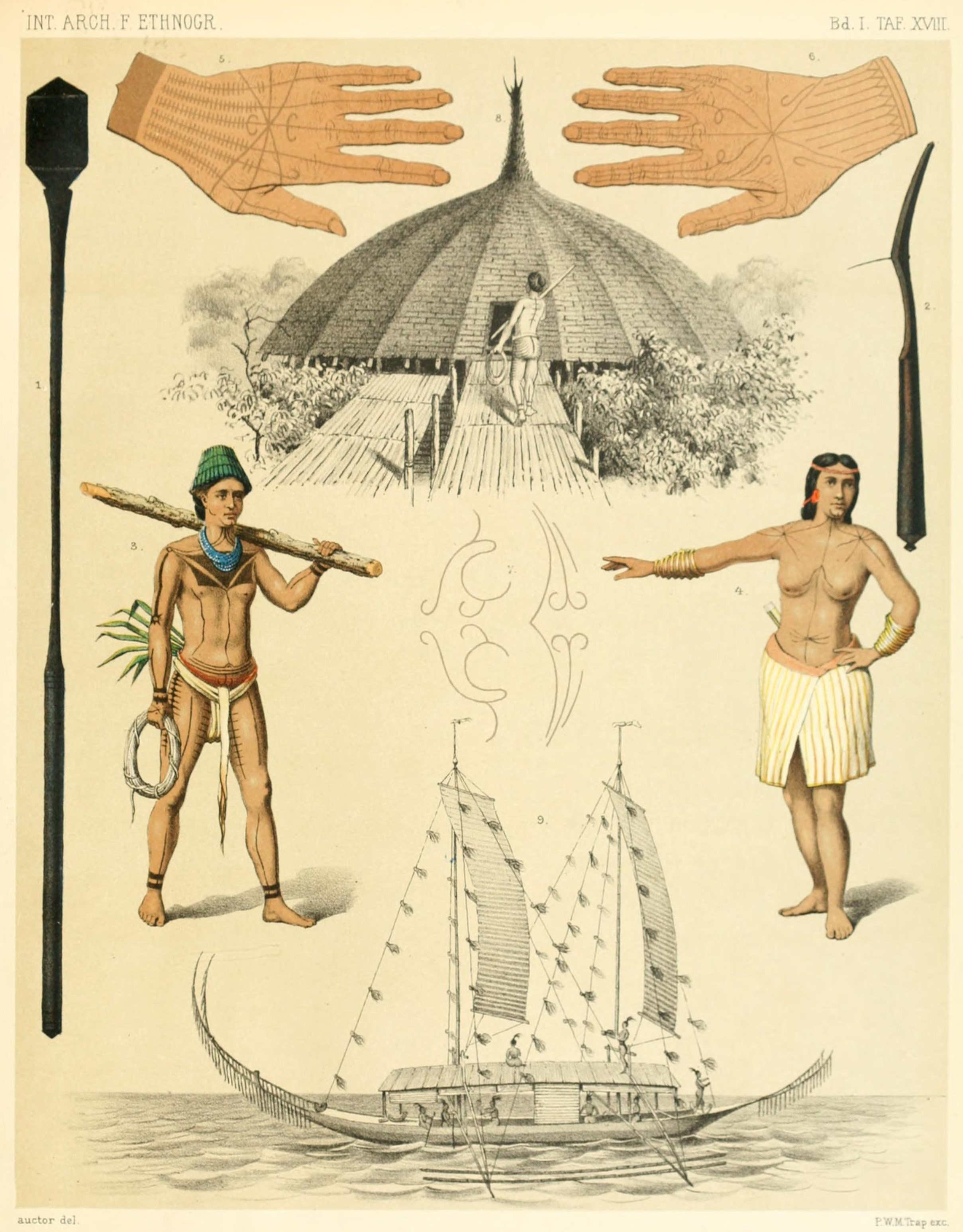
Mentawai islander's tattoo, great house of Pora, and war boat, 1 knabat bogolu. 1888 illustration

One major environmental problem for the Mentawai people is deforestation as their rainforests contain rich timber. In 2015, 20,000 hectares of forest was set aside as a palm oil plantation area in Siberut. Local NGOs pressured the Indonesian authorities to cancel the permit, which included Mentawai traditional lands. However, even with this success, the possibility of logging remains a constant threat on the islands. More than 80 percent of the Mentawai Islands are owned and managed by the state, which makes it difficult for Mentawai people to manage their own lands and natural resources.

Without the collective voice of the Mentawai community, their rights and the protection of Siberut's natural resources will be entirely subject to state control. Thus, beginning in 2009 members of the Mentawai community recognized the need to preserve their traditions as a means of improving their health, well-being and quality of life. As a result, they began seeking change, having surveyed the wider community and discerned that an overwhelming majority wanted to protect and perpetuate their culture. One proposed strategy includes community driven indigenous educational programs. They are designed to provide indigenous Mentawai with the opportunity to reconnect with and learn the most important and relevant aspects of their cultural and environmental heritage. The programs, while still being developed and implemented, will run in conjunction with mainstream education and will be taught by the Mentawai for the Mentawai organization. Another promising program called "The Cultural and Ecological Education Program" provides opportunities for Mentawai people to learn the aspects of indigenous education and lifestyle they deem most important for their current and future prosperity.

== Customs and Culture ==
The Mentawai people generally live in groups according to their respective tribes. Each tribe usually inhabits and has a specific village (langgai). In its later development, in a village there are usually two classifications, namely the village-opening tribe group (si bakat langgai) and the immigrant tribe group (si toi). Their villages are usually established along the river. The village-opening group has certain rights, especially in controlling land and the location of food sources in their residential environment. Members of immigrant descendants who want to open fields or build houses must ask permission from the clan leader of the village-opening descendants.

=== Language ===
The Mentawai language is spoken in Monganpoula Village, North Siberut District; Maileppet Village, South Siberut District; and Sioban Village, Sipora District, and Makalo Village, South Pagai, Mentawai Islands Regency, West Sumatra Province.

The Mentawai language consists of three dialects: (1) the North Siberut dialect, (2) the South Siberut dialect, and (3) the Sipora Pagai dialect. The North Siberut dialect is spoken in Monganpoula Village, North Siberut District. The South Siberut dialect is spoken in Maileppet Village, South Siberut District. The Sipora-Pagai dialect is spoken in Sioban Village, Sipora District, and Makalo Village, South Pagai District. The Sipora-Pagai dialect is the standard dialect because it has the widest geographical distribution and the largest number of speakers, and is located in the district government center.

Based on dialectometric calculations, the percentage difference between the three dialects ranges from 51% to 69%. The Mentawai isolect is a language with a percentage difference ranging from 81% to 100% when compared to Batak and Minangkabau.

=== Arts ===
Drawings on the wall of a Mentawai communal house. Photo from Wereldmuseum Amsterdam, date unknown.

The development of Mentawai arts is generally related to various traditional ceremonies and daily life. Their art forms are largely based on appreciation of the surrounding nature, for example, imitations of the movements or sounds of hunted animals, etc. Vocal and dance arts developed according to ceremonial needs, such as for weddings and funerals. Dance and vocal arts are also part of the healing process by a shaman (sikerei). Today, these indigenous art forms are diminishing, as their development is increasingly limited to the Lua people.

=== Kinship System ===
A uma can be inhabited by around 5-10 nuclear families, with some even having up to 20 families. These families occupy a uma based on paternal descent (patrilineal). Thus, a uma constitutes a patrilineal extended family unit. A kinship group whose members share a common patrilineal descent is called a muntogat. Each muntogat has a specific "uma" (family name) that serves as the center of its members' activities.

== Clan ==
In the Mentawai people, the clan name is referred to as suku (tribe), just as among the Minangkabau people, and it serves as the family name, used after the name of each Mentawai person.

There are more than 50 clans found among the Mentawai people:

A

- Anakalang

B

- Berisigep
- Boassababang

G

- Galet
- Gougou

K

- Kainde
- Kasirebbeb

L

- Laggaiku
- Leleu

M

- Malakopa
- Melei

O

- Oinan

P

- Paabanan
- Panandean
- Pangetuat
- Pasowbaliok
- Purorogat

S

- Sababang
- Sababalat
- Sabaggalet
- Sabajou
- Sabebegen
- Sabelau
- Sabola
- Sadodolu
- Saerejen
- Sagalak
- Sagoilok
- Sagugurat
- Saguntung
- Sagurug
- Sagurung
- Sagurung
- Saguruwjuw
- Saibuma
- Sailokoat
- Sakailoat
- Sakeletuk
- Sakerebau
- Sakerengan
- Sakeru
- Sakoan
- Sakobou
- Sakoikoi
- Sakukuret
- Sakulok
- Salabi
- Salabok
- Salaisek
- Salakkomak
- Salamanang
- Salamao
- Saleilei
- Saleleu
- Saleleubaja
- Salimu
- Samairapkoat
- Samalinggai
- Samaradik
- Samaloisa
- Samangilailai
- Sambentiro
- Samongilailai
- Sanene
- Sangaimang
- Saogo
- Sapalakkai
- Sapeai
- Sapelege
- Sapojai
- Sarogdok
- Saroro
- Sasaleji
- Satoinong
- Satoko
- Satoleuru
- Saumanuk
- Saumatgerat
- Saurei
- Seminora
- Sikaraja
- Sikatsila
- Sikerey
- Silainge
- Simakoklo
- Sibelasin
- Sipatiti
- New Siri
- Siribere
- Siriottoi
- Siriparang
- Siriratei
- Sirirui
- Sirisagu
- Sirisocut
- Siritoitet
- Siritubui

T

- Taileleu
- Talopulei
- Tasirileuleu
- Tasirleleu
- Tatebburuk
- Tateuteu
- Tatubeket
- Tetubekket

== Livelihood ==
The staple foods of the Mentawai people are sago and fish. They obtain sago from the abundant swamp forests surrounding their homes. Today, they also use rice as a daily staple. One of the Mentawai's traditional foods, always present, especially at ceremonies and traditional celebrations, is pork. They also cultivate their crops by clearing the forest using rudimentary tools. The crops they grow are generally also used for daily meals, such as taro and sweet potatoes. They also commonly eat fruits abundantly found around their homes, such as durian, banana, papaya, etc. Other occupations include hunting animals in the forest and fishing in rivers, swamps, or the sea. This area also produces forest products that are traded outside the Mentawai region, such as wood, resin, and rattan. Other traded products include cloves and copra. They usually obtain other daily necessities through trade relations with outsiders, especially from Padang city.

== Notable people ==
- Yudas Sabaggalet, Indonesian politician and lecturer, Regent of Mentawai Islands Regency (2011-2016; 2017-2022)

== Popular culture ==
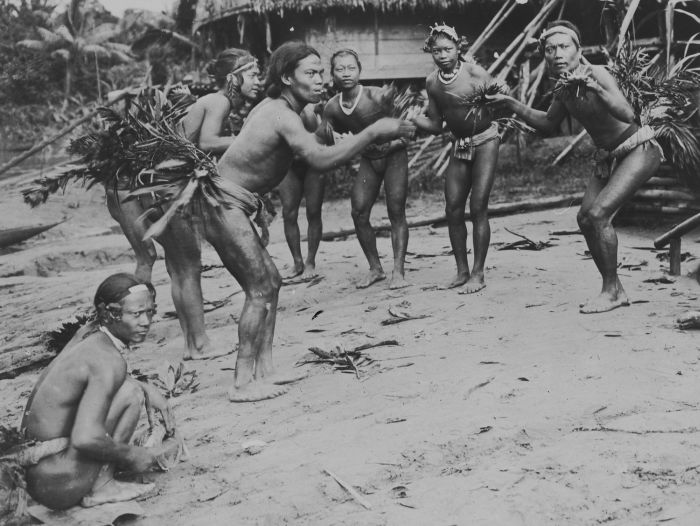
A group of Mentawai men portraying chicken in a dance, circa 1900–1940.

- BBC Two's Tribal Wives: Mentawai.
- The documentary film 'As Worlds Divide' documents the lives of modern Mentawai people and premiered in Melbourne on March 24, 2017. The film was available as a part of an international 'Watch a film, save a culture' campaign in October 2017.
- Law of the Jungle: Sumatra

== See also ==
- Sipora
- Siberut
- Nias
- Nias people
- Austronesian expansion
- Proto-Malay
- Sumba people
