= List of regencies and cities in Bengkulu =

This is a list of regencies and city in Bengkulu province. As of October 2019, there were 9 regencies and 1 city.

#	Regency/ City	Capital	Regent/ Mayor	Area (km^{2})	Population (2019)	District	Kelurahan (urban village)/ Desa (village)	Logo	Location map
1	Bengkulu Selatan Regency	Manna	Gusnan Mulyadi	1.186,10	167.997	11	16/142		
2	Bengkulu Tengah Regency	Karang Tinggi	Ferry Ramli	1.223,94	113.056	10	1/142		
3	Bengkulu Utara Regency	Arga Makmur	Mian	4.324,60	284.505	19	5/215		
4	Kaur Regency	Bintuhan	Gusril Fauzi	2.369,05	129.843	15	3/192		
5	Kepahiang Regency	Kepahiang	Hidayatullah Sjahid	665,00	151.019	8	12/105		
6	Lebong Regency	Muara Aman	Rosjonsyah Syahili	1.921,82	112.900	13	11/93		
7	Mukomuko Regency	Mukomuko	Choirul Huda	4.036,70	180.951	15	3/148		
8	Rejang Lebong Regency	Curup	Ahmad Hijazi	1.639,98	278.865	15	34/122		
9	Seluma Regency	Tais	Bundra Jaya	2.400,44	211.619	14	20/182		
10	Bengkulu	-	Helmi Hasan	151,70	368.784	9	67/-		
