= Rejang =

Rejang or Rejangese may refer to:

- Rejang people, an ethnic group of Sumatra, Indonesia
- Rejang language, a language of Sumatra, Indonesia
- Rejang Lebong Regency, a regency in Bengkulu Province, Sumatra, Indonesia
- Rejang script, a writing system formerly used in Sumatra, Indonesia
  - Rejang (Unicode block) characters used in the Rejang script
- Rejang dance, a sacred Balinese dance
- Rejang Kayan language, spoken on the island of Borneo in Malaysia and Indonesia
- Rejang–Sajau languages, a group of mutually intelligible isolects spoken by the Punan Bah

== See also ==
- Rajang (disambiguation)
