= Bengkulu Malay =

Malayic language spoken in Indonesia

- Bahaso Bengkulu
- Region: Bengkulu, Sumatra
- Ethnicity: Bengkulu Malays
- Native speakers: 66,000
- Language family: Austronesian: Malayo-Polynesian; (disputed); Malayic; South Barisan Malay; Bengkulu Malay
- Writing system: Latin, Jawi, and Rejang

Language codes
- ISO 639-3: (covered by pse)
- Glottolog: beng1290
- Linguasphere: 33-AFA-du

Bengkulu Malay, or simply Bengkulu, is a Malayic language spoken primarily in the province of Bengkulu, Indonesia, including Bengkulu City and surrounding areas, as well as parts of Pesisir Barat Regency in the province of Lampung. It is the native language of the Bengkulu Malays and is more closely related to other Central Sumatra Malay varieties, such as Col, Jambi Malay, Palembang Malay, and Minangkabau, than to the Rejang language, which is also spoken in the province.

The Bengkulu Malay is threatened with extinction. In 2021, only about 50% of the people of Bengkulu City still actively speaks the language, namely the residents who live in the coastal area which is called Kampung Lamo. Overall, Bengkulu Malay received a score of 44%, so the status of its language vitality is endangered because it is in the range of 41–60%.

== Geographic distribution ==
Bengkulu Malay is mostly spoken in Bengkulu City, North Bengkulu Regency, parts of Central Bengkulu Regency, and the coast from Seluma Regency to the Pesisir Barat Regency in the province of Lampung. Its speakers can also be found in the Bengkulu highlands, in Curup, Rejang Lebong Regency, amidst Rejang speakers.

Apart from Indonesia, Bengkulu Malay speakers also exist in their region in Malaysia, specifically in Sungai Choh, Selangor. The Bengkulu Malays have lived there for three generations and still maintain the Bengkulu Malay.

== Usage ==
The Bengkulu Malays primarily speak Bengkulu Malay, a regional variant of the Malayic languages that has developed through assimilation with various cultures. It serves as the dominant language in Bengkulu City and is widely used as a lingua franca across the province, facilitating communication between different ethnic groups.

As the most widely spoken language in the province of Bengkulu, Bengkulu Malay holds an important cultural and social role. While native to the Bengkulu Malays, it is also used by other ethnic groups, including Lembak, Rejang, Batak, and Chinese communities. In rural areas, in the, where indigenous languages such as Rejang and Mukomuko are still spoken, Bengkulu Malay remains a common means of interethnic communication.

Despite linguistic diversity in the province, Bengkulu Malay continues to function as a symbol of identity for the Bengkulu Malays, reflecting their history, traditions, and cultural adaptability.

== Foreign influence ==
Bengkulu Malay has been influenced by several regional and foreign languages, including Rejang, Serawai, Pekal, Mukomuko, Minangkabau, Javanese, Arabic, English, and Dutch. Many loanwords from these languages have been incorporated into its vocabulary. For example, words such as kilap 'lightning', maap 'sorry', and nerako 'hell' come from Arabic, surgo 'heaven' comes from Sanskrit while terms like kabat 'cupboard', jel 'jail', and pakit 'pocket' come from English. Meanwhile, Dutch influences can be seen in words like ban 'tire' and bangku 'bench'.

== Phonology ==
Bengkulu is written in the Latin, Jawi, and sometimes in Rejang scripts.

=== Consonants ===
		Labial	Alveolar	Palatal	Velar	Glottal
Plosive	voiceless	p ⟨p⟩	t ⟨t⟩	tɕ ⟨c⟩	k ⟨k⟩	ʔ ⟨k⟩ (coda)
Plosive	voiced	b ⟨b⟩	d ⟨d⟩	dʑ ⟨j⟩	ɡ ⟨g⟩	ʔ ⟨k⟩ (coda)
Nasal		m ⟨m⟩	n ⟨n⟩	ɲ ⟨ny⟩, ⟨n⟩ (before c/j)	ŋ ⟨ng⟩	
Fricative			s ⟨s⟩	ɕ ⟨si⟩		(h ⟨h⟩) (coda)
Lateral			l ⟨l⟩			
Tap			ɾ ⟨r⟩			
Semivowel				j ⟨y⟩	w ⟨w⟩	

The letters ⟨f⟩, ⟨sy⟩, ⟨v⟩ and ⟨z⟩ are used in loanwords from Indonesian.

=== Vowels ===
	Front	Central	Back
Close	i ⟨i⟩		u ⟨u⟩
Middle	ɛ ⟨e/é⟩	ə ⟨e⟩	ɔ ⟨o⟩
Open	a~ɑ ⟨a⟩		

Bengkulu diphthongs are ⟨ai⟩, ⟨au⟩.
