= Rejang people =

Ethnic people in Indonesia

Tun Hejang / Tun Jang
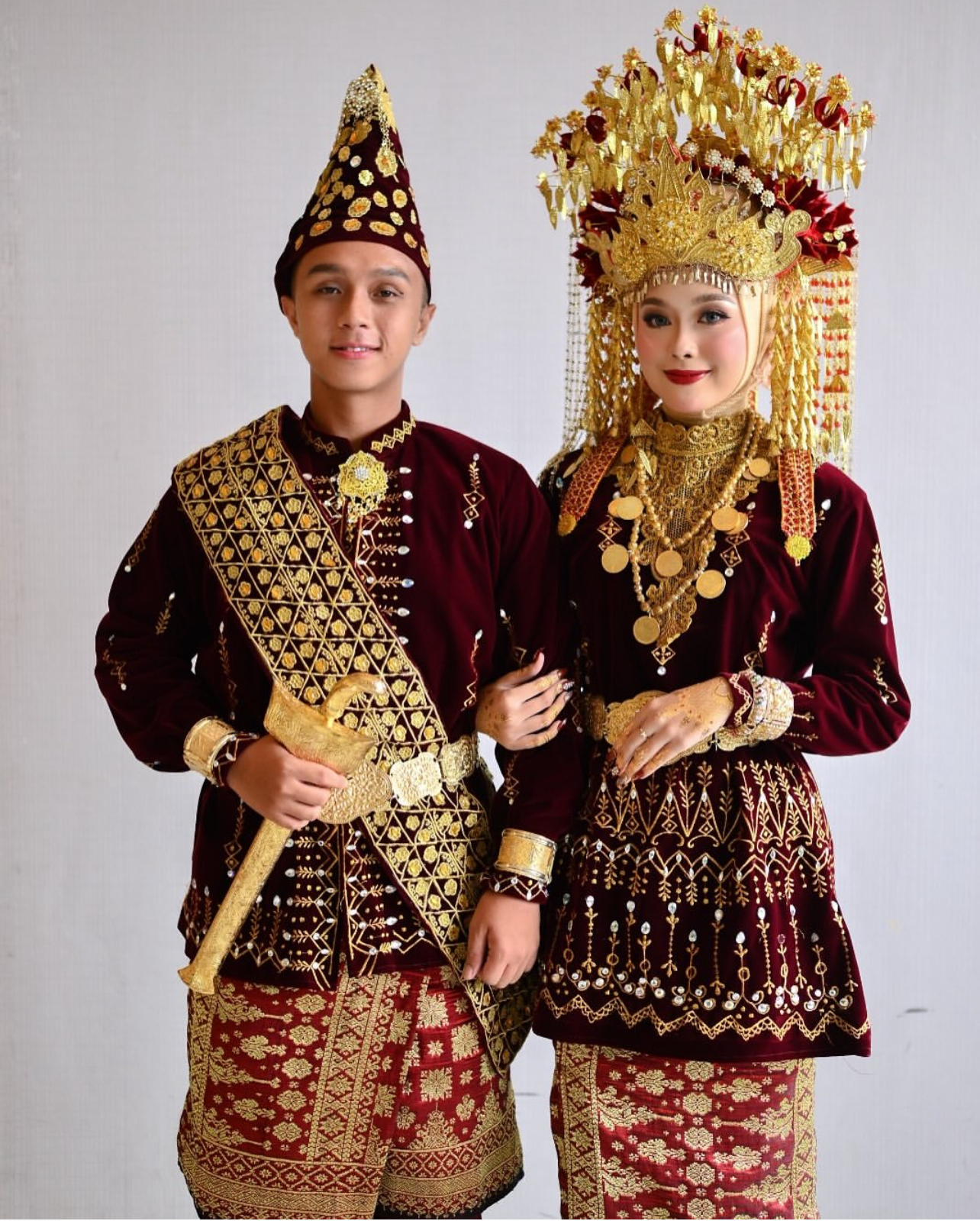
- Rejang traditional attire

Total population
- Approximately 1.2 million (2016 estimate)

Regions with significant populations
- Indonesia: 1.5 - 2 million
- Bengkulu,: 1.1 million
- South Sumatra: 30,000
- Others: 70,000

Languages
- Native: Rejang; Indonesian; Dialects: Musi, Kebanagung, Pesisir, Kepahiang, Lebong; Other: Malay

Religion
- Sunni Islam

Related ethnic groups
- Austronesian peoples; Malay; Minangkabau; Lampungese; Kerinci; Lembak; Serawai; Pasemah

Rejang people (Rejang: Tun Hejang or Tun Jang) are an Austronesian ethnolinguistic group, native to some parts of Bengkulu Province and South Sumatera Province in the southwestern part of Sumatera Island, Indonesia. They occupied some area in a cool mountain slopes of the Barisan mountain range in both sides of Bengkulu and South Sumatra. With approximately more than 1,3 million people, they form the largest ethnic group in Bengkulu Province. Rejang people predominantly live as a majority in 5 out 10 regencies and city of Bengkulu Province, while the rest of them who live in South Sumatera Province reside in 7 villages in the district called as Bermani Ulu Rawas. The Rejangs are predominantly an Islam adherent group with small numbers following a religion other than Islam. According to research, Rejang people are the descendants of the Bukar-Sadong people who migrated from Northern Borneo (Sarawak).

== Etymology ==
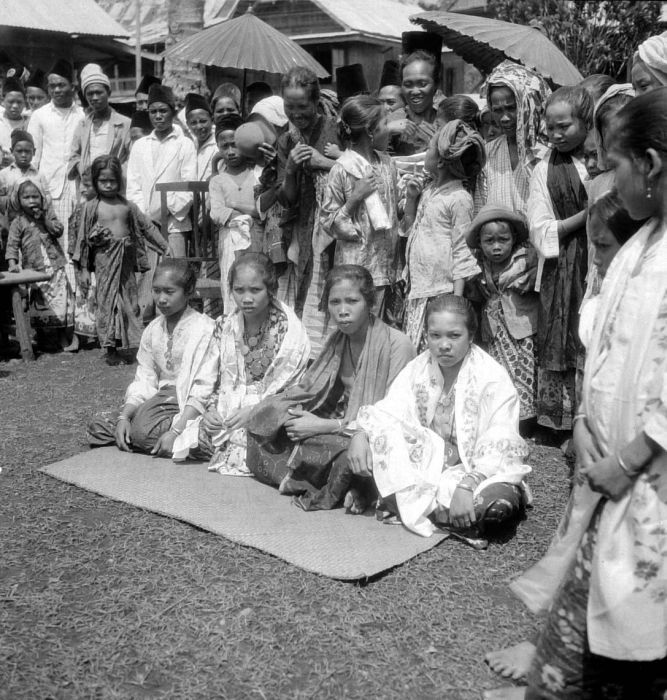
A group of dancing virgins at Curup, Rejang Lebong, Bengkulu, Indonesia in 1939.

The etymology of the name of Rejang or in Rejang language itself as Jang is remains unclear. It is not clearly known when the name Rejang people was used or when did they first regard themselves as Rejang. Another question that is yet to be certain if the name Rejang itself is a term or reference name that was given by other neighboring ethnic groups. According to the locals of Lebong Regency, it is believed that the word Rejang means "to cross over". This belief if based on a widely spread myth among the Rejang community in Tapus, which is believed to be the oldest Rejang settlement. The belief mentions that the ancestors of the Rejang people came from a distant land where its exact location is unknown. Hence, some scholars believe that the term Jang or Rejang has a correlation with the possibility of Rejang people in ancient time did not reside in Sumatra.

On the basis of that belief, therefore according to Professor Richard McGinn's observation that presents a theory or hypothesis that the ancestors of the Rejang people originate from a region in the northwestern part of Borneo that is known as Sarawak today, from which the ancestors of the Rejang people crossed over the Karimata Strait from Borneo to Sumatra with unclear reason. The term Jang or the verb Merejang means "passed" (specifically means "passed the strait") or "traveling not on land". However, the meaning of Jang word which is the native term used by Rejang people to describe themselves as a single entity remains unclear. The usage of that word also limited just for describing the entity of Jang and uncommon in the daily conversation. Upon their arrival at the estuary of the Musi River, they went upwards Musi River and Rawas River towards the upstream to the place where majority of the Rejang settlements are today in the interior of Bengkulu Province. The term Rejang is also the same as the Rejang River in Sarawak, Malaysia, the place where it is thought to be the land of origin of the Rejang people before settling in Sumatra.

Apart from that among the community of Taba Anyar Village, there is a story that the term Rejang and Lebong are correlated and is used as the name for Rejang Lebong Regency came from the common practice of merajang rebung (meaning "chopping bamboo shoots") in the Rejang community that is still seen today. Bamboo shoots have long been consumed as a food source in the interior of Bengkulu Province. From the common practice of chopping bamboo shoots, then came the term Rejang and Lebong. Nevertheless, this one story is doubted by many parties due to the impression of simply rhyme matching the terms alone.

== Population ==
The population is not well measured, with estimates from 250,000 to a million. The 2000 Indonesian census estimated the population at around 350,000.

== Distribution ==
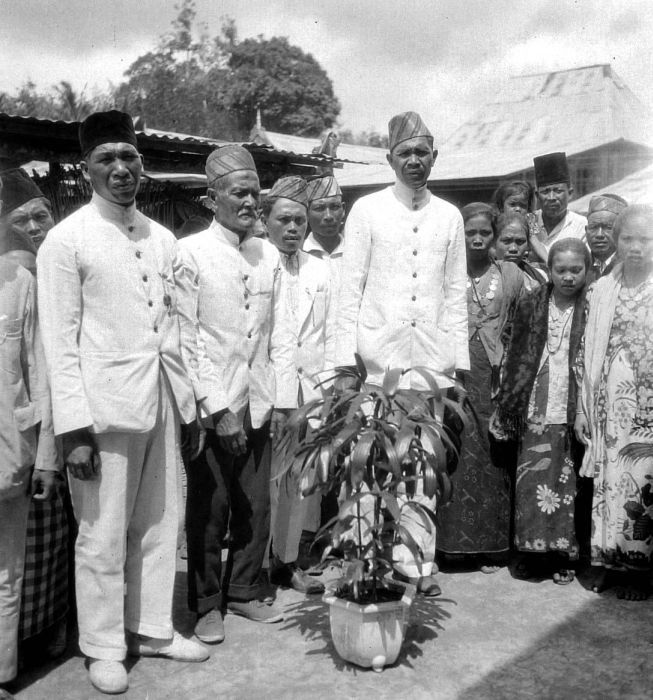
Rejang village heads in Curup, Bengkulu, South Sumatra, Indonesia, circa 1939.

In Bengkulu Province, the Rejang people are prevalent in Rejang Lebong Regency (districts of Lebong Utara, Lebong Selatan, Curup and Kepahiang), in North Bengkulu Regency (districts of Taba Penanjung, Pondok Kelapa, Kerkap, Arga Makmur and Lais), in Kepahiang Regency, in Lebong Regency and in Central Bengkulu Regency. Majority of them lived in along the slopes of Bukit Barisan mountain range.

== History ==
Ancestors of Rejang people are ancient Austronesian peoples. Their migration to Sumatra occurred as a result of several waves of migration 1,200 years ago from Tonkin, Indochina through Borneo. Some linguist argue on the basis of the analysis of Rejang language, that the main role in the formation of Rejang people was played by settlers from the island of Kalimantan.

In the first half of the 19th century, the lands of Rejang people were captured by the Dutch colonialists (the Dutch were in power along the coastal areas of Bengkulu was officially established on April 6, 1825, but many internal areas were not colonized until the 1860s). According to reports of Dutch officials in Bengkulu, the Rejang was divided into 5 linguistic and tribal groups, each of which was subject to a separate leader. The traditional culture of Rejang people was badly affected, when at the end of the 19th century, gold was found in their lands and a large number of miners who did not belong to their people went to this region. The rapid spread of monetary relations led to the decline of local traditional way of life, but the natives retained their customary law, dancing and singing. In 1945 the lands of Rejang people became part of Indonesia.

== Ethnic groups relations ==
Neighboring ethnics includes the Serawai people, Bengkulu Malays, Kerinci people, Pasemah people, and Lembak people. Rejang people had always been sharing some vocabularies with these people because of the proximity between them. In this common era, there are many inter-ethnic marriage between Rejang with its neighboring ethnic groups.

Suggested relation with ethnics from Borneo includes Bidayuh, Bukar, and Sadong.

== Language ==
The Rejang people have a language of their own with the same name. The Rejang language is the main language used to carry out conversations at home or among the extended families. While in public places or while conversing with non-Rejang people, the language that is used is the Bengkulu language. The Bengkulu language at this moment is seen as a lingua franca to carry out communication between the native Rejang people and the non-native ethnic people. Bengkulu is a variant of the Malay language with its own native speakers in Bengkulu Province. The Bengkulu language is known for sharing similarities with Minangkabau language and Palembang Malay.

Linguist Richard McGinn suggests that the Rejang people originate from outside of Sumatra and migrated there for reason yet to be known. Sarawak is the region where it is said to be the birthplace of the Rejang people before migrating to Sumatra. According to McGinn, Rejang does not have a single related language in Sumatra. Based on his observations the closest language to the Rejang language is the Bukar Sadong language in Sarawak that is classified under the Bidayuh people or previously known as "Land Dayak" people. However, the language of the Rejang people are quite different from the Rejang-Baram languages of Borneo.

As the Rejang language belongs to the Malayo-Polynesian languages group of the Austronesian languages family, this language possesses a number of similar vocabularies with a variety of other indigenous languages and spoken in farther locations in Indonesia.

The Rejang language consists of five major dialects with distinct variations and differences among the dialects itself in various degrees. Four of the five dialects are used in Bengkulu Province and the other one is used in North Musi Rawas Regency, South Sumatra Province. The five dialects are:-

- Rejang-Musi dialect is not uniform and therefore divided into two dialects namely:-
  - Musei / Musi / Musai / Kepahiang dialect. It is used along the upstream of Musi River in Rejang Lebong Regency, part of North Bengkulu Regency and parts of Kepahiang Regency especially in Merigi and Ujan Mas.
  - Cu'up / Curup dialect, the archaic name is Selupu dialect. It is spoken in Curup and its surrounding region.
- Utara dialect, also known with the name Pesisia / Pesisir / Coastal dialect. It is spoken in parts of Central Bengkulu Regency such as Pondok Kelapa and in regions of North Bengkulu Regency.
- Lebong dialect. It is spoken in Aman Delta and Tes Lake, Lebong Regency and it surrounding region. This dialect is regarded as the standard Rejang language.
- Awes or Rawas dialect. It is used in upstream of Rawas River in North Musi Rawas Regency. This dialect is considered as the proto-dialect or the oldest dialect in the Rejang language, and according to Professor McGinn it functions as a tool in helping to reconstruct Old Rejang language.

Speakers of these various Rejang dialects are able to mutually understand each other with the level of understanding of above 80%, except for Rawas dialect. Rawas dialect is almost unrecognizable when spoken to speakers of other dialects.

== Religion ==
=== Folk religion ===
Not much is known about the religion or the beliefs that is practiced by the ancestors of the Rejang people. The most clearest and important relics that exist today that states about the spiritual or religious experiences of the old Rejang society are the punjung and kedurai agung tradition. Both of these traditions are inseparable from each other. Punjung is a pile of land produce or food and cakes that are arranged in a similar manner. Its height could reach up to 2 meters. Allegedly, punjung symbolises the shape of a mountain, Kaba Mountain specifically for Rejang around Ulu Musi which viewed the mountain as an important place in their spiritual world. Punjung is carried out during a procession or a kedurai agung (meaning, "big feast") ritual. Punjung is the offering for the gods that are worshiped through the kedurai agung.

The belief of the Rejang people in the supernatural powers in their surrounding environment has created a dichotomy between diwo and nyang with smat. Diwo refers to "gods" and nyang refers to "goddess". The names of the gods and goddesses of the folk belief of the Rejang people are almost unknown. However, the most well known is the Goddess of Paddy or Goddess of Fertility that is known as Nyang Serai. Nyang Serai is the Rejang people's version of Javanese Goddess of Paddy, Dewi Sri. In honor of the goddess, people in the past would make offerings of sacrificial animals, burn incense or deliver apem pancake. One of the most famous places to carry out the offerings ritual is Bingin Kuning District in Lebong Regency.

There is also a term used for hermitage or prayer to the deities in Rejang language that is called betarak. One of the main locations to betarak is in Mount Kaba. Mount Kaba is actually opened to the public. This area is a conservation area and permission from the officers at the entrance is required and it is an obligation to report the number of hikers. Nevertheless, based on the tale of Muning Raib, Rejang people from Curup are forbidden to enter Mount Kaba to avoid misfortune or calamity.

In contrast to the diwo or nyang that is worshiped by the community, the smat group on the other hand are feared; be it of its nature to consume its victim nor to dwell in certain locations in the lands of the Rejang people. In order to avoid smat, prayer and seeking permission must be done before entering a place or taking something from nature. Seeking a permission is done by saying, "stabik nik, keme nupang melitas", which means "excuse me, granny, we're passing by". Types of smat that the Rejang people believe are such as sebei sebkeu, si'amang bi'oa, sumei and smat la'ut. There are some smats that are positioned as guards or tunggau in certain places. The most well known tunggau among the Rejang people is the Dung Ulau Tujuak or the Seven Headed Snake that inhabits the srawung or underwater cave beneath the Tes Lake, Lebong Regency.

The old Rejang society regard the jungle as a gift by God and as the source of life. The jungle are the source of timber, honey and animal game. When clearing the jungle, the tabeus ritual is carried out to seek permission from the ancestral guardian of the jungle before the clearing of the jungle is carried out. Just as in other society, the jungle or imbo are usually inhabited by mystical animals such as imeu or tiger. For the Rejang community, the tiger is seen as an ancestral incarnation, sacred and should not be hurt or killed. Tigers are seen as old relatives addressed as datuk, ninik or puyang.

=== Present day beliefs ===
Islam first appeared in the area due to the influence of the Banten Sultanate. Later contact with Aceh and West Sumatra helped establish the presence of Islam in the region. Conversion was mainly due to three factors: intermarriage with foreign and native converted Muslims, the growth of trade, and the adoption of cultural traits from nearby Muslim communities. After first contact with Islam, Muslims from Java and other parts of already Islamized Sumatra settled and began setting up Islamic schools and other institutions. The Islamization of the Rejang people took place much later than other Indonesian peoples, and was still under way long into the Dutch era, who actively supported it.

At present, many of the Rejang people embrace Islam. Currently, there are no official statistics on the number of religious beliefs in the Rejang community. It is estimated that nearly all of the Rejang people practice Islam. Most of the Rejang people are not associated with any specific branches of Islam. However, just as other Muslim communities in the Malay Archipelago, the Rejang people are adherents of the Shafi'i school in Sunni Islam. The main Islamic organization are the Muhammadiyah and Nahdlatul Ulama. The minority Islamic organization such as Naqsyabandiyah are often frowned upon as sulup are found in Suka Datang village, North Curup District, Rejang Lebong Regency nearby the Musi River.

The existence of Hindus or Buddhists and Christians in the settlements of the Rejang people is generally related to the non-indigenous communities that lies behind it. Hindus in the Rejang customary region are generally Balinese people, Buddhists are mainly Chinese Indonesians, and Christians are part Batak and Javanese people. Islam is considered as part of the religion of the community and part of which is inseparable from the culture today. Islam influences the funeral procedures, the use of halal food, as well as cultivating the culture of praying and Tahlila in mosque. Islam is estimated to have entered the lands of the Rejang people in the 16th century. Islam was introduced by the Minangkabau people, Bantenese people and Acehnese people, whom had already experienced Islamization earlier.

== Culture ==
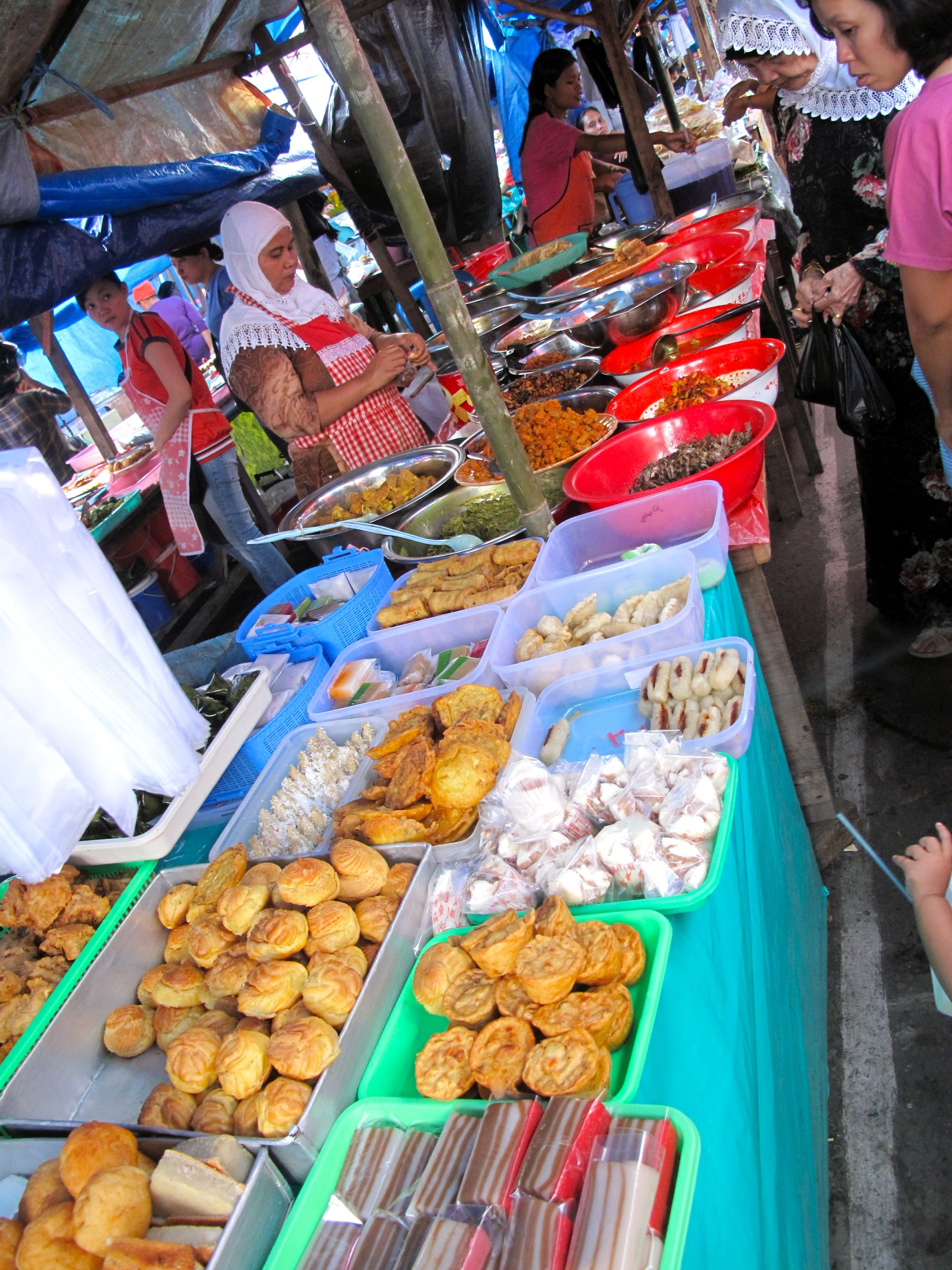
Local foods at a market in Curup, Bengkulu, Indonesia.

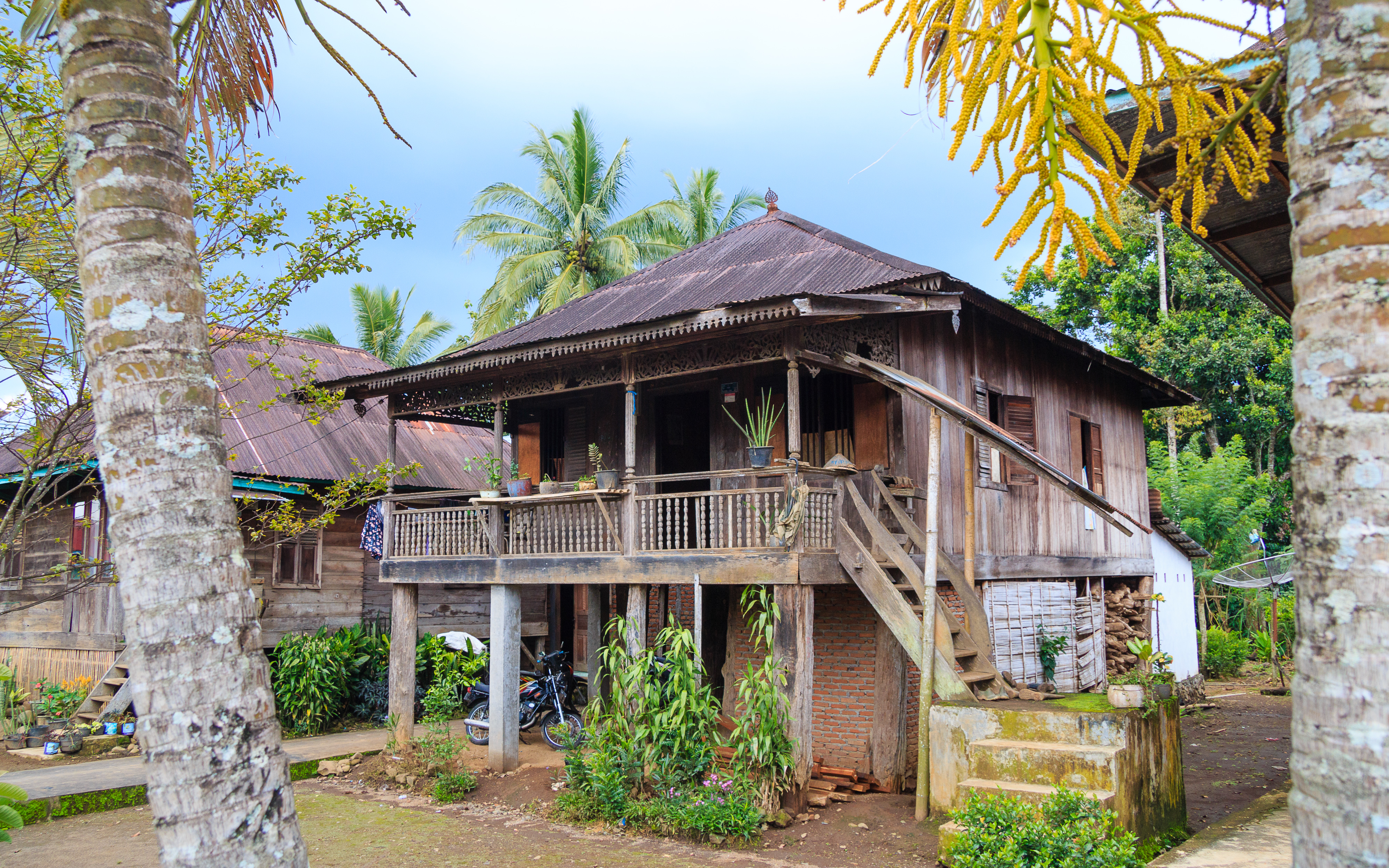
Umeak Potong Jang, the traditional house of Rejang people

Rejang people usually live in the valleys of mountain river area that is known as in the upper of Ketahun River region in Lebong Regency. The main livelihood is agriculture especially as rice cultivators, although they are also considered good fishermen and hunters, and today they also often seek out work as hired workers on plantations and in forestry. The introduction of monetary relations at the end of the 19th century led to large losses of traditional material culture and lifestyle assimilation of other ethnic groups. Today, the Rejang people would even buy clothing from other neighboring people groups. However, the culture of the Rejang people is considered slightly maladaptive, because they miss out on many of the benefits of modern civilization and they treat foreigners with disdain.

The main social structure is made up of rural hamlet (talang), consisting of 10 to 15 houses. Traditional families are usually large and extended. The kinship is counted only on the patriarchal lineage. Children from the intermarriage of Rejang women with other ethnicity receive a lower status in the community than pure blooded Rejang children. Noble families of kutei (meaning, "community") are distinguished, who are considered to be the founders of the village or the whole populated area. Leaders are chosen from their noble class to form a leadership system called, tui kutei or tuei kutei or tuwi kutei. Rejang people have a common law for all customary matters; which differs significantly from both state legislation and the norms of Islam. The leaders have long lost the possibility of absolute rule over their fellow society, but retained their functions as judges.

Rejang people are known for their song and dance art, including popular female dances. In Rejang society, women do occupy high position. In their customary law, severe penalties such as adultery are provided; which is in line with Islamic laws that makes it easier for the Rejang people and also one of the earliest people group to convert to Islam. In the present era, despite a number of them still adhere to traditional cultural practices, many Rejang people have received higher education and have been represented in various modern skilled professions or as government employees.

=== Festivals ===
There are a few festivals that are celebrated by the Rejang people especially, Rayo or Idulfitri, Rayo Ajai or Iduladha, annual celebration of each Regencies as well as Indonesian Independence Day in every August. Rayo and Rayo Ajai are the two biggest celebrations for the Rejang people. These two religious holidays of Islam; that is already considered as the people's religion, is the time for people to return to their hometown, visit families, vacationing with family members and to build close bonds with one another. The night in celebrating Rayo as well as Rayo Ajai, parade, processions and small scale fireworks can be seen. In the 27th day of Ramadan towards Rayo, the Rejang people observe the Opoi Malem Likua tradition where they would light up wooden poles of coconut husks in front of their houses for the spirit of their ancestors to be able to find their way back to their homes for the Rayo celebration.

Annual Regency Day and Indonesian Independence Day are two festivals that are celebrated by the Rejang people are not related to any religion. During the Annual Regency Day, exhibition by the relevant Small and medium-sized enterprises of the Regency, along with musical performances of artists that were invited from various places. The largest Annual Regency Day is carried out in May annually in Curup, Rejang Lebong Regency. While the Indonesian Independence Day celebrated in August annually is enliven with street contest and other typical independence day competitions such as climbing Areca nut palm, sack racing, tug of war, street marching and others.

=== Martial arts ===
Pencak Silat is one of the many kind of Rejang culture. The Pencak Silat that originate from Rejang land is well known as Silat Jang Pat Petulai.

=== Traditional weapons ===
Most of the traditional Rejang weapons are bladed weapons. These traditional weapons in everyday practicability were metamorphosed into various tools that are needed for everyday usage. Traditional Rejang weapons includes the spear which is referred to as kujua or kujuh, the parang that is called pitat, the badik or badek, the kris or ke-is and a curved badik in a shape of a tiger's claw is called badek slon imeu.

The usage of the parang is seen as a compulsory tool to bring along when working on the field. The parang is used for land clearing, to make pathways, to cut wood and to split open coconuts. The use of spear is becoming lesser these days. Generally, it was used for traditionally catching fish in the clear river waters. Kris is generally used in martial arts or as amulets to be kept in homes.
