= Merigi =

Merigi is a district (kecamatan) of Kepahiang Regency, Bengkulu, Indonesia.

== Toponymy ==
Merigi is a Malay's term of original name in Rejang, Migai (or alternatively Migêi), which is taken from a farewell speech by Ki Geto (the founder of Merigi clan) to his brother Ki Karang Nio, "Uyo itê sa'ok, keme ami igai belek". These words are loosely translated into English "From now on we are detached (one another), we will not ever return". After the farewell, Ki Geto would led his people to established new villages outside Lebong, the heartland of Rejang people and stay there since then.

== History ==
Merigi was established on 16 November 2005, after being split off from the northwestern part of Kepahiang district.

== Administrative division ==
Merigi is divided into six villages (Indonesian: desa) and one urban village (Indonesian: kelurahan), shown below.

- Taba Mulan
- Batu Ampar
- Bukit Barisan
- Durian Depun (urban village)
- Lubuk Penyamun
- Pulo Geto
- Pulo Geto Baru
- Simpang Kota Bingin

The headquarter of the district is located in Durian Depun. All villages are under 5 km from the headquarter. The head 9Indonesian: camat) of Merigi district is Mr. Aji Abdullah.

== Demography ==
According to the Indonesian Census of 2020, Merigi has a population numbering 11.942 people, with 6.112 of them are males and the rest is females.

== Economy ==
Merigi's economy is generally based on agriculture and plantations, with the main commodities being corn, sweet potatoes, peanuts, coffee, cocoa, coconut, sugar palm, vanilla, kapok, areca nut, and cinnamon.

== Bibliography ==
=== Books ===
- BPS Kabupaten Kepahiang (24 September 2021). Kecamatan Merigi dalam Angka 2021 [Merigi District in Figures 2021]. Kepahiang: BPS Kabupaten Kepahiang. p. xvi + 84.
- LeBar, Frank M. (1976). Insular Southeast Asia: Sumatra. 2 v. New Haven: Human Relations Area Files, Yale University. p. 191.
- Proyek Penelitian dan Pencatatan Kebudayaan Daerah (1989). Adat dan Upacara Perkawinan Daerah Bengkulu [Marriage Custom and Ceremony of Bengkulu Region]. Jakarta: Departemen Pendidikan dan Kebudayaan, Pusat Penelitian Sejarah dan Budaya, Proyek Penelitian dan Pencatatan Kebudayaan Daerah. p. 89.
- Siddik, Abdullah (1980). Hukum Adat Rejang [Rejang's Customary Law]. Jakarta: Balai Pustaka. p. 51.

=== Jurnal ===
- Mutmaidah, Siti (November 2018). "Potensi Tanaman Pangan dan Perkebunan untuk Pengembangan Wilayah Kabupaten Kepahiang" [Identification of Food and Plantation Crops for Potential Regional Development in Kepahiang Regency]. Jurnal Sosial Ekonomi Pertanian (J-SEP). 11 (3). Departemen Ekonomi, Fakultas Pertanian Universitas Jember: 29.
