= Kabawetan =

Kabawetan is a district (kecamatan) of Kepahiang Regency, Bengkulu, Indonesia.

== History ==
Kabawetan was established on 16 November 2005, after being split off from the northern part of Kepahiang district.

== Subdistricts ==
- Air Sempiang
- Babakan Bogor
- Bandung Baru
- Bandung Jaya
- Barat Wetan
- Bukit Sari
- Mekar Sari
- Pematang Donok
- Sido Makmur
- Sido Rejo
- Suka Sari
- Sumber Sari
- Tangsi Baru
- Tangsi Duren
- Tugu Rejo
