= Kepahiang =

Kepahiang may refer to:

- Kepahiang Regency, a regency (kabupaten) in Bengkulu province, Indonesia
- Kepahiang District, a district (kecamatan) of Kepahiang Regency
