= Lembak people =

Ethnic people in Indonesia

Total population
- Approximately 100,000 (1980 estimate)

Regions with significant populations

Languages
- Lembak, Indonesian

Religion
- Sunni Islam (predominantly)

Related ethnic groups
- Basemah, Bengkulu Malays, Kerinci, Lahat, Rejang, Serawai

Lembak people, also known as Linggau people, are a local ethnic group that inhabits several areas of Bengkulu Province and South Sumatra Province in Indonesia. Their original settlements are in the border area between the two provinces, in the Barisan mountain range, with densely clustered villages pattern.

The majority of Lembak people embrace Islam, and the religion influences their daily life.

== Etymology ==
The word lembak has several meanings, namely "valley", "land along meander", or "rear". This may be related to their alleged origin, namely in the Musi Rawas river valley in South Sumatra.

== History ==
Around 2000 BC, the Austronesian (proto-Malay) people who already had a high culture came to the archipelago, including to the Bengkulu area. They already had the ability to sail the seas with outrigger boats, knew astrology, and their livelihood was fishing and farming. They also made clat pots and jars, and already produced certain arts. Around 1000 BC came the Paleo-Mongoloid (deutro-Malay) group, who first lived mainly on the coastal areas as fishermen or traders. The two groups of Malays in time developed into the native tribes of Bengkulu, among others the Enggano people, the Rejang people, the Serawai people, the Bengkulu Malay people, and the Lembak people.

== Population ==
The population of Lembak people is estimated at 100,000 people (1980). In Bengkulu Province, they mostly live in Talang Empat district in Central Bengkulu Regency, Kepala Curup and Padang Ulak Tanding districts in Rejang Lebong Regency, and in Gading Cempaka district in Bengkulu City. In South Sumatra Province, they settled in Musi Rawas Regency and Lubuklinggau City. The Lembak people have several sub-tribes, namely:

- Lembak Delapan in Central Bengkulu and Bengkulu City
- Lembak Bulang in Bengkulu City and its surroundings
- Lembak Beliti in Rejang Lebong, and South Sumatra

== Language ==
Lembak people have their own language, called Col language (or Lembak language), which is closely related to Malay language. The language has several dialects, namely Lembak Delapan, Lembak Beliti, and Lembak Kayu Agung dialects. The Beliti dialect in Musi Rawas & Lubuklinggau is also known as the Sindang dialect. In the past, their language was written in a traditional script, called surat ulu (or rencong script). However, currently the Lembak people use modern Roman script to conduct their daily activities.

== Occupation ==
Their main occupations have traditionally been growing rice, vegetables and fruit in the fields. Many of their fertile plantation lands are planted with coffee, clove and pepper; while some others work as traders, carpenters etc. In general, farming work is done together according to the season.
