= Tebat Karai District =

Coordinates: 3.6412°S 102.6414°E

Tebat Karai is a sub district (kecamatan) of Kepahiang Regency, Bengkulu.

== History ==
Tebat Karai was established on 7 January 2004 following the establishment of Kepahiang Regency.

== Subdistricts ==
- Taba Saling
- Taba Sating
- Tertik
- Talang Karet
- Tebing Penyamun
- Peraduan Binjai
- Penanjung Panjang Atas
- Penanjung Panjang
- Taba Air Pauh
- Nanti Agung
- Sinar Gunung
- Karang Tengah
- Tapak Gedung
