= Batu Galing =

- Administrative village
- Interactive map of Batu Galing
- Coordinates: 3.4743°S 102.5380°E
- Country: Indonesia
- Province: Bengkulu Province
- Regency: Rejang Lebong
- District: Curup Tengah

Government
  - Lurah: Azwan S.P

Area
  - Total: 0.24 km^{2} (0.093 sq mi)

Population (2014)
  - Total: 1,492
  - Density: 6,200/km^{2} (16,000/sq mi)
- Postal code: 39114

Batu Galing is an administrative village at Curup Tengah district, Rejang Lebong, Indonesia. Batu Galing has a total area of 0.24 square kilometres (0.09 square miles) and with total population of 1492. Formerly Batu Galing subdistrict was a part of Talang Rimbo Lama subdistrict, this subdistrict was established in 2006. For the people of Curup city and Rejang Lebong this area was known as Perumnas Batu Galing or Old Perumnas.
