= Rejang language =

Austronesian language spoken in Sumatra, Indonesia

Rejang
- Miling Hejang; Miling Jang
- Native to: Indonesia
- Region: Bengkulu Province; Central Bengkulu Regency; Kepahiang Regency; Lebong Regency; North Bengkulu Regency; Rejang Lebong Regency; Seluma Regency; South Sumatra Province; Empat Lawang Regency; Lubuklinggau City; Musi Rawas Regency; North Musi Rawas Regency
- Ethnicity: Rejang people
- Native speakers: (350,000 cited 2000 census)
- Language family: Austronesian: Malayo-Polynesian; Greater North Borneo (?); Rejang
- Dialects: Kebanagung; Lebong; Pasisir; Rawas; Rejang Musi
- Writing system: Latin; Surat Ulu (Rejang)

Language codes
- ISO 639-3: rej
- Glottolog: reja1240
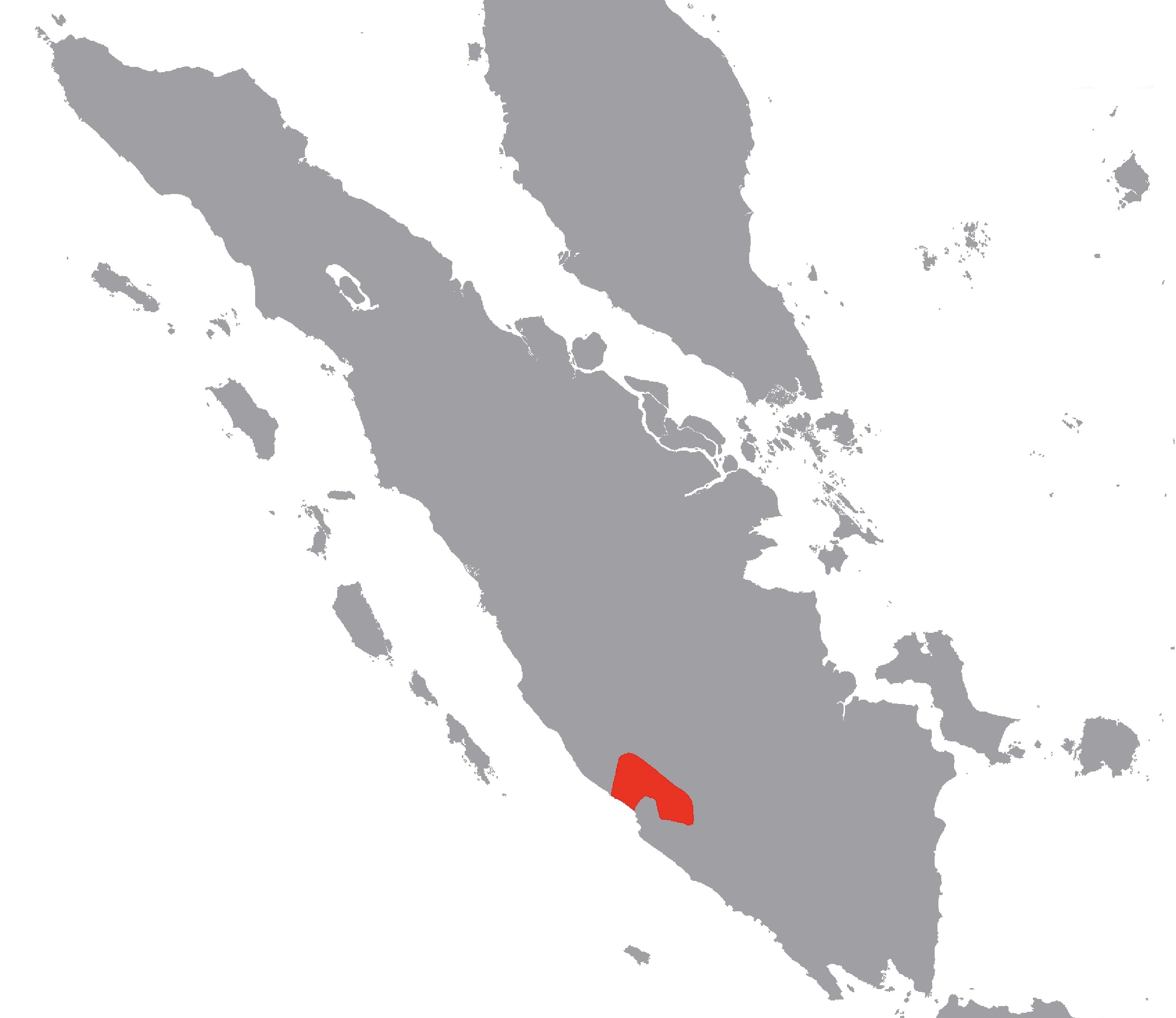

Rejang (miling Jang, miling Hejang) is an Austronesian language predominantly spoken by the Rejang people in southwestern parts of Sumatra (Bengkulu), Indonesia. There are five dialects, spread from mountainous region to the coastal region of Bengkulu, including the Musi (Musai) dialect, the Lebong dialect, the Kebanagung dialect, the Rawas (Awes) dialect, and the Pesisir dialect.

== Classification ==
Rejang is not obviously close to other Malayo-Polynesian languages in Sumatra. McGinn (2009) classified it among the Bidayuh languages of Borneo, closest to Bukar–Sadong. According to the source, these languages shared raising of *a to *ə word-finally, or in final syllables except those ending in velar consonants *k, *ŋ. It may be that it is related to the newly described language Nasal, but that is speculative at this point. Robert Blust and Alexander Smith classified Rejang as part of Greater North Borneo languages (2017a, 2017b). Glottolog classifies Rejang as the only language of its own branch among the Malayo-Polynesian languages (the same treatment as Palauan and Sundanese).

== Dialects ==
Rejang has five different dialects. Speakers of each dialects are able to communicate with one another, in spite of lexical and phonological differences. The four dialects of Rejang language are Curup, Lebong, Kepahiang, and Utara. Among all dialects, Awes dialect is the hardest for the speakers of other dialects.

== Writing system ==
Rejang lacks a standardized writing system. The Latin alphabet was introduced only recently as a means of writing the language, though its usage remains unstandardized.

There is a common misconception exists regarding the Rejang alphabet; despite bearing the name "Rejang," this script was historically never used to write the Rejang language. Instead, it was used to write High Malay, which served as the formal variety for the predominantly diglossic Rejang people.

== Phonology ==
=== Consonants ===
| | | Labial | Alveolar | Palatal | Velar | Glottal |
|---|---|---|---|---|---|---|
| Nasal | | m | n | ɲ | ŋ | |
| Plosive/ Affricate | voiceless | p | t | tʃ | k | ʔ |
| Plosive/ Affricate | voiced | b | d | dʒ | ɡ | |
| Fricative | | | s | | | h |
| Trill | | | (r) | | | |
| Lateral | | | l | | | |
| Approximant | | w | | j | | |

A trill /r/ is also present, but only in loanwords.

=== Vowels ===
| | Front | Central | Back |
|---|---|---|---|
| Close | i | | u |
| Mid | e | ə | o |
| Open | | a | |

== Vocabulary ==
=== Astronomical terms ===
| English | Lebong Dialect | Curup Dialect | Kepahiang Dialect | Utara Dialect |
|---|---|---|---|---|
| earth | bumai dênio dunio | bumêi dênio dunio | bumêi dênio dunio | bumai dênio dunio |
| star | bitang | bitang | bitang | bitang |
| moon | bulên | bulên | bulên | bulên |
| sun | mataibilai | matêibilêi | matêibilêi matoibiloi | mataibilai |
| cloud | awên | awên | awên | awên |
| sky | lenget | lenget | lenget | lenget |

=== Gender ===
| English | Lebong Dialect | Curup Dialect | Kepahiang Dialect | Utara Dialect |
|---|---|---|---|---|
| female | slawêi | bia, sêbia, bie, sêbie, slawie | bêa | slawêi |
| male | smanêi | sêbong, smanie | smanêi | smanêi |
| third gender | tayuk | tayuk | tayuk | tayuk |

=== Colour ===
| English | Lebong Dialect | Curup Dialect | Kepahiang Dialect | Utara Dialect |
|---|---|---|---|---|
| red | miləak | miləak | abang | miləak |
| white | putiak | puteak | puteah | puteak |
| black | məluo | mələu | mələa | məluo |
| green | ijo | ijo | ijo | ijo |
| blue | biru/blu/blau | biru/blu/bləu | biru/blu/bləu | biru/blu/blau |
| grey | abu-abu/abau | abu-abu/abəu | abu-abu/abəu | abu-abu/abəu |
| orange | jingga | jingga | jingga | jingga |
| violet | ungau | ungəu | ungəu | ungau |
| brown | perang | perang | perang | coklat |
| pink | miləak mudo/miləak jamau | miləak mudo/miləak jaməu | miləah mudo/miləak jaməu | abang mude/miləak jamau |
| silver | pirok | pirak | pirak | pirak |
| maroon | miləak atie | miləak atəi | abang atəei | miləak atəi |

=== Pronouns ===
| English | Lebong Dialect | Curup Dialect | Kepahiang Dialect | Utara Dialect |
|---|---|---|---|---|
| I | uku ku | uku ku | uku u | uku, ku |
| you | kumu (honour, formal) ko (common) | kumu (honour, formal) ko (common) | ko | kumu (honour, formal) ko (common) |
| we | itê | itê | itê | itê |
| they | tobo'o | tobo'o | toboho | tobo'o |
| he/she | si | si | si | si |

=== Numbers ===
| Numeral | English | Lebong Dialect | Curup Dialect | Kepahiang Dialect | Utara Dialect |
|---|---|---|---|---|---|
| 0 | zero | kosong | nol | nol | nol |
| 1 | one | do (sometimes dəlai) | do (sometimes dəlai) | do (sometimes dikup) | do (sometimes dəlai) |
| 2 | two | duai | duəi | dui | duəi |
| 3 | three | təlau | tələu | tələu | təlau |
| 4 | four | əpat, pat | əpat, pat | əpat, pat | əpat, pat |
| 5 | five | ləmo | ləmo | ləmo | ləmo |
| 6 | six | num | num | num | num |
| 7 | seven | tujuak | tojoak | tojoah | tojoak |
| 8 | eight | dəlapən | dəlapən | dəlapən | dəlapən |
| 9 | nine | semilan | semilan | semilan | semilan |
| 10 | ten | dəpuluak | dəpoloak | dəpoloah | dəpoloak |
| 11 | eleven | səblas | səblas | səblas | səblas |
| 12 | twelve | duai bəlas | duəi bəlas | dui bəlas | duəi balas |
| 13 | thirteen | təlau bəlas | tələu bəlas | tələu bəlas | təlau bəlas |
| 19 | nineteen | seilan bəlas | semilan bəlas | semilan bəlas | semilan bəlas |
| 20 | twenty | duai puluak | duəi poloak | dui poloah | duəi poloak |
| 21 | twenty-one | duai puluak satu | duəi poloak satu | dui poloah satu | duəi poloak do |
| 50 | fifty | ləmo puluak | ləmo poloak | ləmo poloah | ləmo poloak |
| 100 | one hundred | sotos | sotos | sotos | sotos |
| 200 | two hundred | duai otos | duəi otos | dui otos | duəi otos |
| 1000 | one thousand | səribau | səribeu | səribeu | səribau |
| 10,000 | ten thousand | dəpuluak ribau | dəpoloak ribəu | dəpoloah ribəu | dəpoloak ribau |
| 100,000 | one hundred thousand | sotos ribau | sotos ribəu | sotos ribəu | sotos ribau |
| 1,000,000 | one million | dəjuta | dəjuta | dəjuta | dəjuta |

=== Days of the week ===
| English | Lebong Dialect | Curup Dialect | Kepahiang Dialect | Utara Dialect |
|---|---|---|---|---|
| Monday | sənin | sənin | sənin | sənin |
| Tuesday | səlasa | səlasa | səlasa | səlasa |
| Wednesday | rabau/rabu/rəbau | rabəu/rabu/rəbəu | rabəu/rabu/rəbəu | rebaa/rəbu/rəbəu |
| Thursday | kəmis | kəmis | kəmis | kəmis |
| Friday | jəm'at/jum'at | jəma'at/jum'at | jəmahat/jum'at | jəm'at/jum'at |
| Saturday | sabtau/səbtau/səbtu | sabtəu | seteu | sabtau/səbtau |
| Sunday | mingau | mingəu | mingəu | mingəu |

=== Prepositions ===
==== Place ====
| English | Lebong Dialect | Curup Dialect | Kepahiang Dialect | Utara Dialect |
|---|---|---|---|---|
| behind | bêlakang kədong | bêlakang kêdong | bêlakang kêdong | bêlakang kêdong |
| beside | dêpêak pêak | dêpêak pêak | dêpêah pêah saping | dêpêak pêak |
| above | das | das | das | das |
| in front of | muko | muko | adep | muko |
| outside | luêa | luêa | luêh | luêa |
| inside | lêm | lêm | lêm | lêm |
| corner | iding | iding | iding | iding |
| under | bêak | bêak | bêah | bêak |
| between | antaro | antaro | antaro | antaro |

=== Basic elements ===
| English | Lebong Dialect | Curup Dialect | Kepahiang Dialect | Utara Dialect |
|---|---|---|---|---|
| wind | angin | angin | angin | angin |
| water | bioa | bioa | bioa | bioa |
| land | tanêak | tanêak | tanəah | tanəak |
| soil | pitok | pitak | pitak | pitak |
| air | udaro | udaro | udaro | udaro |
| fire | opoi | opoi | opoe | opoi |

== Sample text ==
The following is a sample text in Rejang, of Article 1 of the Universal Declaration of Human Rights (by the United Nations):

Kutê tun laher mêrdeka, tmuan hok-hok gik srai. Kutê nagiak-ba akêa peker ngen atêi, kêrno o kêlok-nê bêkuat-ba do ngen luyên lêm asai sêpasuak.

Gloss (word-to-word):

Article 1 – All human was born independent, has an equal rights. They are endowed a way to think and heart; then they need to be friend each other in the taste of brotherhood.

Translation (grammatical):

Article 1 – All human beings are born free and equal in rights. They are endowed with reason and conscience and should act towards one another in a spirit of brotherhood.

== Bibliography ==
- Blust, Robert (2010). "The Greater North Borneo Hypothesis". Oceanic Linguistics. 49 (1). University of Hawai'i Press: 44–118. doi:10.1353/ol.0.0060. JSTOR 40783586. S2CID 145459318.
- MacGinn, Richard (1982). Outline of Rejang Syntax (PDF). NUSA 14. Jakarta: Universitas Atma Jaya.
- Smith, Alexander D. (2017). The Languages of Borneo: A Comprehensive Classification (PDF) (Ph.D. thesis). University of Hawai‘i at Mānoa. Archived from the original (PDF) on 20 July 2023.
- Smith, Alexander D. (2017). "The Western Malayo-Polynesian Problem". Oceanic Linguistics. 56 (2). University of Hawai'i Press: 435–490. doi:10.1353/ol.2017.0021. S2CID 149377092.
