= Rejang alphabet =

Abugida used to write Malay and Rejang

Rejang ꥆꤰ꥓ꤼꤽ ꤽꥍꤺꥏ
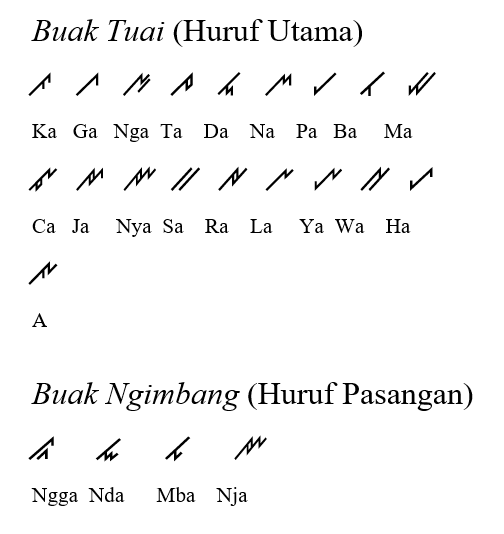
- Script type: Abugida
- Period: ?–present
- Direction: Left-to-right
- Languages: Malay, Bengkulu, Rejang

Related scripts
- Parent systems: Proto-Sinaitic alphabet: Phoenician alphabet; Aramaic alphabet; Brāhmī; Tamil-Brahmi; Pallava; Old Kawi; Ulu scripts; Rejang
- Sister systems: Kerinci, Lampung, Lembak, Ogan, Pasemah, Serawai

ISO 15924
- ISO 15924: Rjng (363), Rejang (Redjang, Kaganga)

Unicode
- Unicode alias: Rejang
- Unicode range: U+A930–U+A95F

Part of a series on

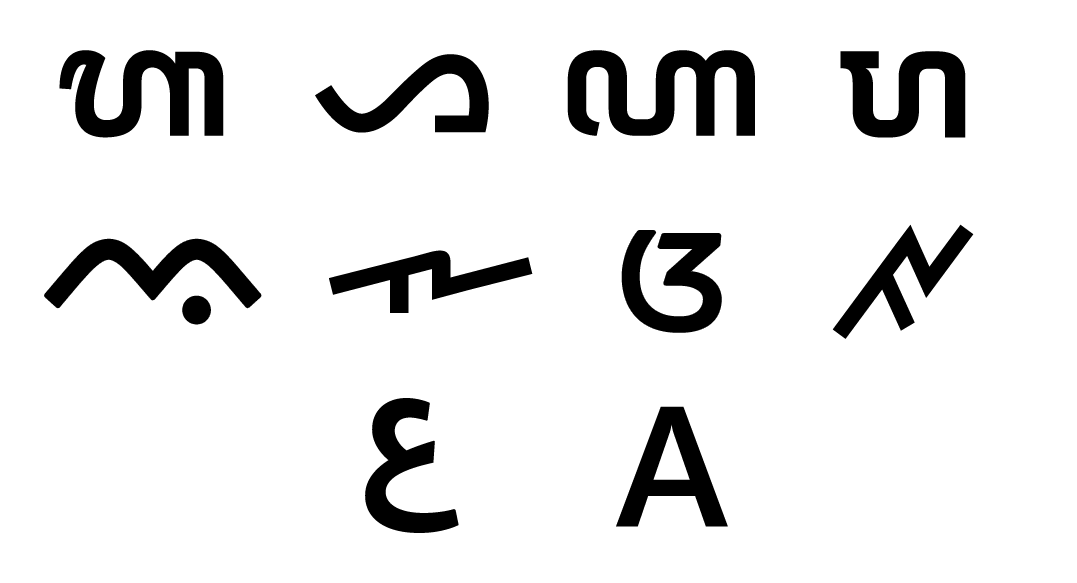

Writing systems used in Indonesia
Abugida (Brahmic)
- Balinese
- Batak
- Buda
- Javanese
- Kawi
- Lontara (Satera Jontal, Mbojo)
- Makasar
- Sasak
- Sundanese (Old Sundanese)
- Ulu (Incung, Komering, Lampung, Lembak,
- Ogan, Pasemah, Rejang, Serawai)
Abjad
- Buri Wolio
- Jawi
- Jawoe
- Pegon
Alphabet
- Latin (Van Ophuijsen, Suwandi, EYD)
Others
- Alifuru
- Bonda
- Cia-Cia
- Bilang-bilang
- Dunging
Related
- List of writing systems of Indonesia
- Languages of Indonesia

The Rejang script is an abugida of the Brahmic family that is related to other scripts of the region, such as the Batak and Lontara scripts. Rejang is also a member of the closely related group of Ulu scripts that include the script variants of South Sumatra, Bengkulu, Lembak, Lintang, Lebong, and Serawai. Other closely related scripts that are sometimes included in the Surat Ulu group include the Ogan, Kerinci, and Lampung scripts. The script was in use prior to the introduction of Islam to the Rejang area; the earliest attested document appears to date from the mid-18th century CE. The Rejang script is sometimes also known as the KaGaNga script following the first three letters of the alphabet, ꤰꤱꤲ. The term KaGaNga was never used by the users of the script community, but it was coined by the British anthropologist Mervyn A. Jaspan (1926–1975) in his book Folk literature of South Sumatra. Redjang Ka-Ga-Nga texts. Canberra, The Australian National University 1964.

The script was used to write texts in Malay and Rejang, which is now spoken by about 200,000 people living in Indonesia on the island of Sumatra in the southwest highlands, north Bengkulu Province, around Arga Makmur, Muaraaman, Curup, and Kepahiang, and also in the Rawas area of South Sumatra Province, near Muara Kulam. There are five major dialects of Rejang: Lebong, Musi, Kebanagung, Pesisir (all in Bengkulu Province), and Rawas (in South Sumatra Province). Most of its users live in fairly remote rural areas, of whom slightly less than half are literate.

The traditional Rejang corpus consists chiefly of ritual texts, medical incantations, and poetry.

== Letters ==
Consonants
ꤰ IPA: [k]	ꤱ IPA: [ɡ]	ꤲ IPA: [ŋ]	ꤳ IPA: [t]	ꤴ IPA: [d]	ꤵ IPA: [n]	ꤶ IPA: [p]	ꤷ IPA: [b]	ꤸ IPA: [m]	ꤹ IPA: [c]	ꤺ IPA: [ɟ]
ꤻ IPA: [ɲ]	ꤼ IPA: [s]	ꤽ IPA: [r]	ꤾ IPA: [l]	ꤿ IPA: [j]	ꥀ IPA: [w]	ꥁ IPA: [h]	ꥂ IPA: [mb]	ꥃ IPA: [ŋg]	ꥄ IPA: [nd]	ꥅ IPA: [ɲɟ]

As in other Brahmic scripts, Rejang consonants have an inherent vowel [a] or [ə], so, for example, the consonant ⟨ꤰ⟩ is pronounced ka or kə. Other vowels are represented by diacritics attached to a base letter. Vowel diacritics may also be attached to the base letter ⟨ꥆ⟩ a, which acts as a null consonant.

Vowel diacritics and examples with ⟨ꥃ⟩, ŋga.
ꥇ IPA: [i], [ɪ]	ꥈ IPA: [u], [ʊ]	ꥉ IPA: [ɛ], [e]	ꥊ IPA: [ai̯]	ꥋ IPA: [o], [ɔ]	ꥌ IPA: [au̯]	ꥍ IPA: [əu̯]	ꥎ IPA: [ɛa̯]
ꥃꥇ IPA: [ŋgi], [ŋgɪ	ꥃꥈ IPA: [ŋgu], [ŋgʊ]	ꥃꥉ IPA: [ŋgɛ], [ŋge]	ꥃꥊ IPA: [ŋgai̯]	ꥃꥋ IPA: [ŋgo], [ŋgɔ]	ꥃꥌ IPA: [ŋgau̯]	ꥃꥍ IPA: [ŋgəu̯]	ꥃꥎ IPA: [ŋgɛa̯]

Consonants at the end of a syllable are also represented by diacritics. The virama is a "killer stroke" that suppresses any consonant's inherent vowel, leaving an isolated consonant, so, for example, ⟨ꤰ⟩, ka plus a virama ⟨꥓⟩, ⟨ꤰ꥓⟩ is pronounced k.

Final consonants and examples with ⟨ꤳ⟩, ta.
ꥏ IPA: [ŋ]	ꥐ IPA: [n]	ꥑ IPA: [r]	ꥒ IPA: [ʔ]	꥓ virama
ꤳꥏ IPA: [taŋ]	ꤳꥐ IPA: [tan]	ꤳꥑ IPA: [tar]	ꤳꥒ IPA: [taʔ]	ꤳ꥓ IPA: [t] virama

== Unicode ==
Rejang script was added to the Unicode Standard in March, 2008 with the release of version 5.1.

The Unicode block for Rejang is U+A930 –U+A95F:

Rejang^{[1]}^{[2]} Official Unicode Consortium code chart (PDF)
	0	1	2	3	4	5	6	7	8	9	A	B	C	D	E	F
U+A93x	ꤰ	ꤱ	ꤲ	ꤳ	ꤴ	ꤵ	ꤶ	ꤷ	ꤸ	ꤹ	ꤺ	ꤻ	ꤼ	ꤽ	ꤾ	ꤿ
U+A94x	ꥀ	ꥁ	ꥂ	ꥃ	ꥄ	ꥅ	ꥆ	ꥇ	ꥈ	ꥉ	ꥊ	ꥋ	ꥌ	ꥍ	ꥎ	ꥏ
U+A95x	ꥐ	ꥑ	ꥒ	꥓												꥟
Notes 1.As of Unicode version 17.0 2.Grey areas indicate non-assigned code points

== See also ==
- Rencong script
