= Seberang Musi =

Seberang Musi is a district (kecamatan) of Kepahiang Regency, Bengkulu, Indonesia and there is a school.

== Geography ==
Seberang Musi is divided into 13 villages:

- Air Pesi
- Air Selimang
- Bayung
- Benuang Galing
- Cirebon Baru
- Kandang
- Lubuk Saung
- Sungai Jernih
- Taba Padang
- Talang Babatan
- Tebat Laut
- Temdak
