= Ujan Mas =

Ujan Mas is a district (kecamatan) of Kepahiang Regency, Bengkulu, Indonesia.

== Subdistricts ==
- Ujan Mas
- Air Hitam
- Bumi Sari
- Cugung Lalang
- Daspetah
- Daspetah II
- Meranti Jaya
- Pekalongan
- Pungguk Beringang
- Punggung Meranti
- Suro Bali
- Suro Baru
- Suro Ilir
- Suro Lembak
- Suro Muncar
- Tanjung Alam
- Ujan Mas Bawah
