= Kuala Rajang =

Kuala Rajang may refer to:

- Kuala Rajang (federal constituency), formerly represented in the Dewan Rakyat (1990–2008)
- Kuala Rajang (state constituency), represented in the Sarawak State Legislative Assembly

== See also ==
- Rajang (disambiguation)
