= Rajang =

Rajang may refer to:

- Rajang (federal constituency), in Sarawak, Malaysia
- Rajang River, in Sarawak, northwest Borneo, Malaysia
- Rajang, Iran, a village in Nimbeluk Rural District, Nimbeluk District, Qaen County, South Khorasan Province
- Rajang (1968–2018), a hybrid orangutan that lived at the Colchester Zoo since 1980
- Rajang, an ape-like monster from the Japanese media franchise, Monster Hunter.

== See also ==
- Hulu Rajang (federal constituency)
- Kuala Rajang (disambiguation)
- Rejang (disambiguation)
