= Tes Lake =

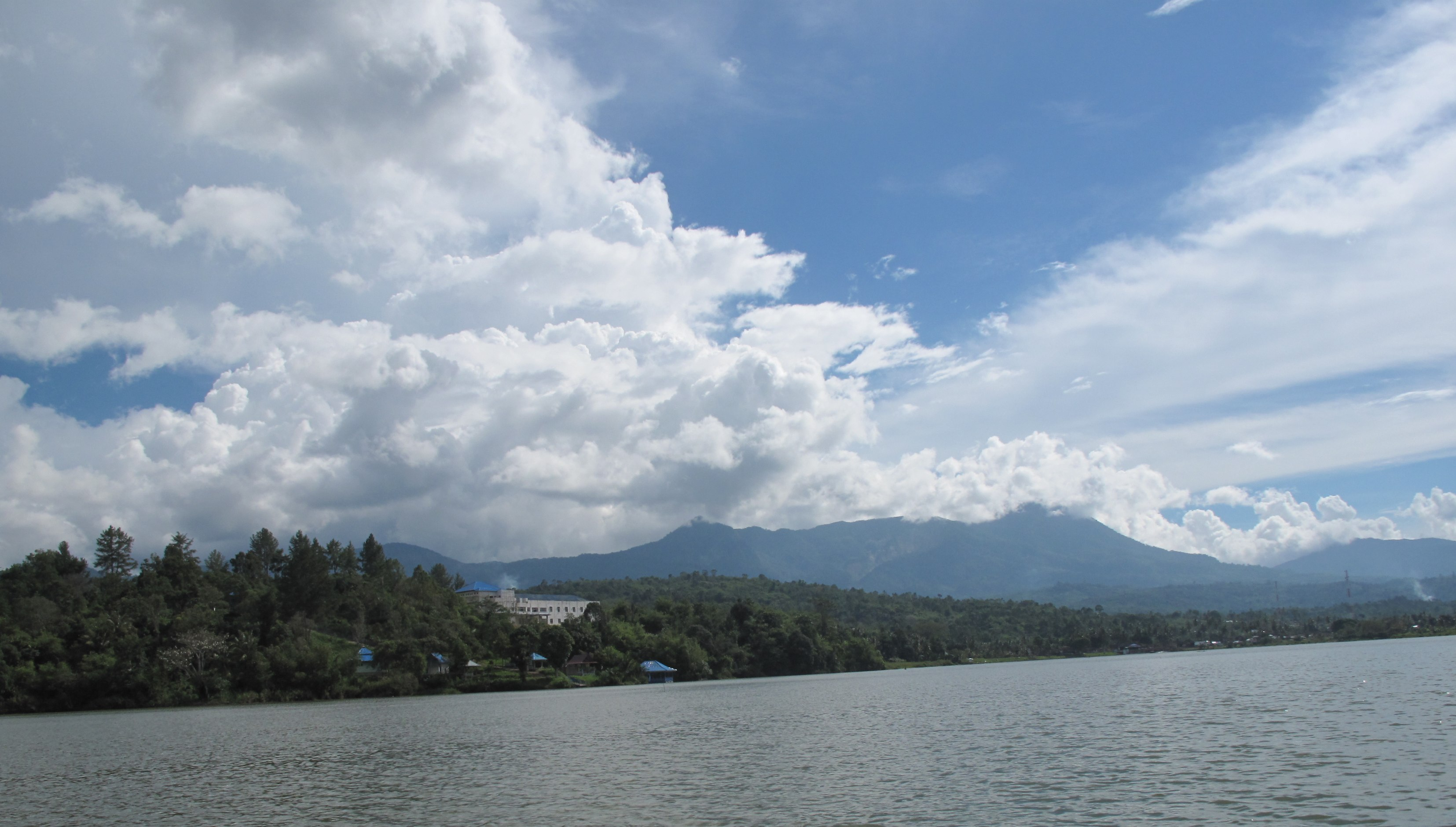

- Location within Sumatra
- Location: Indonesia
- Coordinates: 3°13′40″S 102°20′54″E
- Type: Shrunken lake
- Primary inflows: Ketahun River & Pauh River
- Primary outflows: Air Putih River
- Catchment area: 10 km^{2} (3.9 sq mi)
- Basin countries: Indonesia
- Max. length: 5 km (3.1 mi)
- Max. width: 1 km (0.62 mi)
- Surface area: 5 km^{2} (1.9 sq mi)
- Average depth: 10 m (33 ft)
- Max. depth: 56 m (184 ft)
- Water volume: 0.05 km^{3} (41,000 acre⋅ft)
- Shore length^{1}: 4 km (2.5 mi)
- Surface elevation: 1 m (3 ft 3 in)
- Islands: Bungin Ialand, Pasir Island, Titik Island, Saweak Island & Ujung Island
- ^{1} Shore length is not a well-defined measure.

Tes Lake or Danau Tes is one of the largest lakes in Bengkulu Province, Indonesia. It is the main hydroelectric supplier for nearly all of Bengkulu Province. The lake covers an area of approximately 750 hectares.

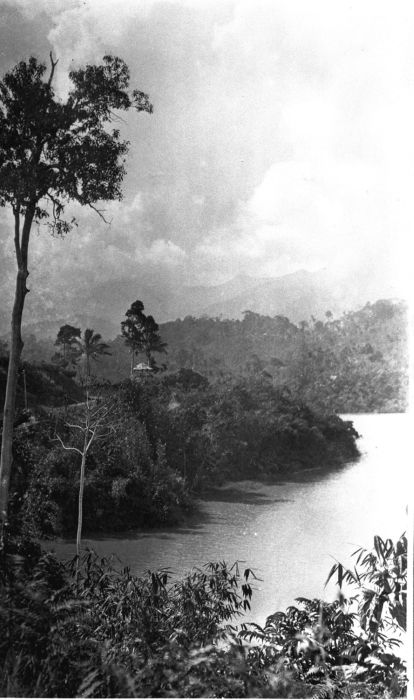
1926 photo of the lake

== Area ==
Tes Lake covers an area of 3,230 hectares.

== Flora ==
Because of its hot and humid climate, crops such as coffee are mainly grown. Other florae that grow around the area are Meranti, Dyera costulata, Kayu Gadis, Pulai, Melaleuca, along with other plants that also grow elsewhere in Bengkulu Province.

== Location ==
Tes Lake lies in the south of Lebong Regency, Bengkulu. The nearby settlements include Karang Anyar, Kutai Donok (Central Village), Talang Ratu Village, and Tes Village.

=== Topography ===
Its elevation is 600 metres (1,969 ft) to 900 metres (2,953 ft) above sea level.

== Geology and climate ==
Based on information from an exploration conducted in 1964, the main types of soil found in Tes Lake are regosol, andosol, latosol, and podzol (brown podzol soil).

Due to its high number of wet seasons, Tes Lake experiences an average annual rainfall intensity of 2,700-3,500mm. According to classifications from Schmidt and Ferguson, the area is classified as type A, with a Q value of approximately 0.9% - 7.7%.

== See also ==
- List of drainage basins in Indonesia
- About Danau Tes by Indonesia Tourism

== Sources ==
- Usman, Mardiansyah; Suhartoyo, Hery (18–22 January 2021). Danau Tes dalam Pengelolaan Taman Wisata Alam di Hulu DAS (Daerah Aliran Sungai) Ketahun, Provinsi Bengkulu [Lake Tes Natural Tourism Park Management in the Upper Ketahun Watershed, Bengkulu Province]. International Lake Environment Committee (Indonesia-Japan) Tranining - Indonesia Lake Conservation Programme. pp. 1–6.
