= Mount Kaba =

Twin volcano in Bengkulu province, Indonesia

Kaba
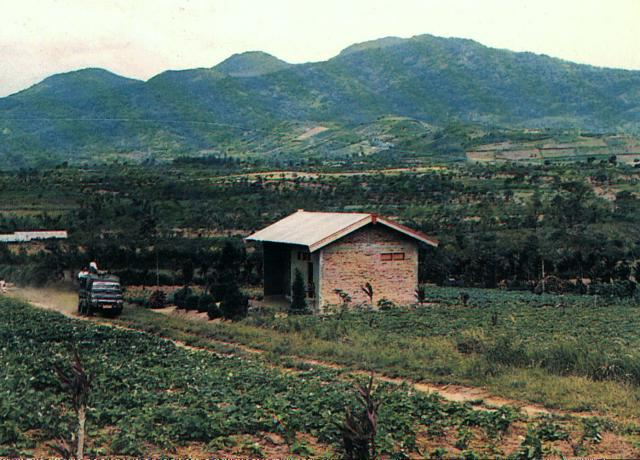

Highest point
- Elevation: 1,952 m (6,404 ft)
- Coordinates: 3.52°S 102.62°E

Geography
- Location: Sumatra, Indonesia

Geology
- Mountain type: Stratovolcano
- Volcanic arc: Sunda Arc
- Last eruption: August 2000

Kaba is a volcano in Indonesia. In 1833 an eruption ejected water from the crater lake, forming lahars that produced damage and fatalities at Talang, Klingi, and Bliti villages.

== See also ==
- List of volcanoes in Indonesia
