= Camat =

Camat may refer to:

- Camat, the head of a district in Indonesia (kecamatan)
- Christopher Camat (born 1979), a Filipino boxer
