= Rejang (Unicode block) =

- Range: U+A930..U+A95F (48 code points)
- Plane: BMP
- Scripts: Rejang
- Major alphabets: Rejang
- Assigned: 37 code points
- Unused: 11 reserved code points

Unicode version history
- 5.1 (2008): 37 (+37)

Unicode documentation
- Code chart ∣ Web page

Rejang is a Unicode block containing characters used prior to the introduction of Islam for writing the Rejang dialects Musi, Kebanagun, Pesisir, and Rawas on the island of Sumatra.

Rejang^{[1]}^{[2]} Official Unicode Consortium code chart (PDF)
	0	1	2	3	4	5	6	7	8	9	A	B	C	D	E	F
U+A93x	ꤰ	ꤱ	ꤲ	ꤳ	ꤴ	ꤵ	ꤶ	ꤷ	ꤸ	ꤹ	ꤺ	ꤻ	ꤼ	ꤽ	ꤾ	ꤿ
U+A94x	ꥀ	ꥁ	ꥂ	ꥃ	ꥄ	ꥅ	ꥆ	ꥇ	ꥈ	ꥉ	ꥊ	ꥋ	ꥌ	ꥍ	ꥎ	ꥏ
U+A95x	ꥐ	ꥑ	ꥒ	꥓												꥟
Notes: 1. As of Unicode version 16.0; 2. Grey areas indicate non-assigned code points

== History ==
The following Unicode-related documents record the purpose and process of defining specific characters in the Rejang block:

Version	Final code points (Note: Proposed code points and characters names may differ from final code points and names)	Count	L2 ID	WG2 ID	Document
5.1	U+A930..A953, A95F	37	L2/06-003	N3023	Everson, Michael (2006-01-11), Preliminary proposal for encoding the Rejang script
5.1	U+A930..A953, A95F	37	L2/06-139	N3096	Everson, Michael (2006-04-24), Proposal for encoding the Rejang script in the BMP of the UCS
5.1	U+A930..A953, A95F	37	L2/06-108		Moore, Lisa (2006-05-25), "C.11", UTC #107 Minutes
5.1	U+A930..A953, A95F	37		N3103 (pdf, doc)	Umamaheswaran, V. S. (2006-08-25), "M48.10", Unconfirmed minutes of WG 2 meeting 48, Mountain View, CA, USA; 2006-04-24/27
5.1	U+A930..A953, A95F	37	L2/24-243		Jacquerye, Denis Moyogo (2024-08-10), Changing Latin script r glyphs and adding their capital characters [Affects U+AB4B and AB4C]
5.1	U+A930..A953, A95F	37	L2/24-228		Kučera, Jan; et al. (2024-11-01), "2.3 Latin Script R Glyphs and Capitals [Affects U+AB4B and AB4C]", Recommendations to UTC #181 (November 2024) on Script Proposals
5.1	U+A930..A953, A95F	37	L2/24-221		Constable, Peter (2024-11-12), "Consensus 181-C9", UTC #181 Minutes, "Change the glyphs of U+AB4B LATIN SMALL LETTER SCRIPT R and U+AB4C LATIN SMALL LETTER SCRIPT R WITH RING"
