= Curup =

Coordinates: 3.4667°S 102.5170°E

- Town
- Motto: "Curup Kota Idaman"
- Interactive map of Curup
- Country: Indonesia
- Province: Bengkulu
- Regency: Rejang Lebong Regency

Government
  - Camat: H.R. Gunawan Wibisono, S. STP.

Area
  - Total: 5.21 km^{2} (2.01 sq mi)

Population (mid 2024 estimate)
  - Total: 26,762
- Time zone: UTC+7 (WIB)

Curup (Indonesian pronunciation: [ˈt͡ʃurʊp̚]; Rejang: Cu'up) is the regency seat and also an administrative district of Rejang Lebong Regency, part of the Indonesian Province of Bengkulu on Sumatra island. The district (kecamatan) has an area of 5.21 km², consisting of nine administrative villages with 26,971 residents at the 2020 Census, rising to 27,017 in the official estimates as of mid 2021, but dropping slightly to 26,762 as of mid 2024. It is the centre of an urban area ("Greater Curup") which had 135,443 inhabitants as at mid 2024. Curup is largely known as the main producing area of rice, vegetables, and especially coffee in Bengkulu, whose harvests are sent to Palembang, Jambi, Padang, Lampung and Jakarta.

== Geography ==
Curup was a landlocked highland located within the plateau of Bukit Barisan, Curup was also administratively bordered by:

- To the north and west was bordered by North Curup (Curup Utara),
- To the south was bordered by South Curup (Curup Selatan),
- To the east was bordered by East Curup (Curup Utara) and Central Curup (Curup Tengah).

== Tourism ==
Some of the famous tourist spots are Monumen Perjuangan, Rejangese Rumah Adat, Jago Setahun, Wisata Kuliner Lapangan Setia Negara, Suban Hot Spring, Bastari Lake, Mount Kaba, the Waterfall in Kepala Curup, Tabarena and prehistoric sites such as Batu Panco.

This area is also known as the habitat of Corpse Flower and Rafflesia arnoldii which attracts people.

== Climate ==
Curup has an elevation moderated tropical rainforest climate (Af) with moderate rainfall from June to August and heavy rainfall in the remaining months.

Climate data for Curup
Month	Jan	Feb	Mar	Apr	May	Jun	Jul	Aug	Sep	Oct	Nov	Dec	Year
Mean daily maximum °C (°F)	27.8 (82.0)	28.3 (82.9)	28.5 (83.3)	28.6 (83.5)	28.7 (83.7)	28.4 (83.1)	28.1 (82.6)	28.2 (82.8)	28.1 (82.6)	27.9 (82.2)	27.8 (82.0)	27.5 (81.5)	28.2 (82.7)
Daily mean °C (°F)	23.1 (73.6)	23.3 (73.9)	23.5 (74.3)	23.7 (74.7)	23.8 (74.8)	23.3 (73.9)	22.9 (73.2)	23.1 (73.6)	23.2 (73.8)	23.1 (73.6)	23.2 (73.8)	23.0 (73.4)	23.3 (73.9)
Mean daily minimum °C (°F)	18.4 (65.1)	18.4 (65.1)	18.5 (65.3)	18.9 (66.0)	18.9 (66.0)	18.3 (64.9)	17.8 (64.0)	18.0 (64.4)	18.3 (64.9)	18.4 (65.1)	18.6 (65.5)	18.5 (65.3)	18.4 (65.1)
Average precipitation mm (inches)	285 (11.2)	223 (8.8)	239 (9.4)	221 (8.7)	155 (6.1)	101 (4.0)	86 (3.4)	115 (4.5)	166 (6.5)	238 (9.4)	249 (9.8)	275 (10.8)	2,353 (92.6)
Source: Climate-Data.org
