= Seluma Regency =

Regency in Bengkulu, Indonesia

Coordinates: 3.9664°S 102.4743°E

Seluma Regency Kabupaten Seluma
- Regency
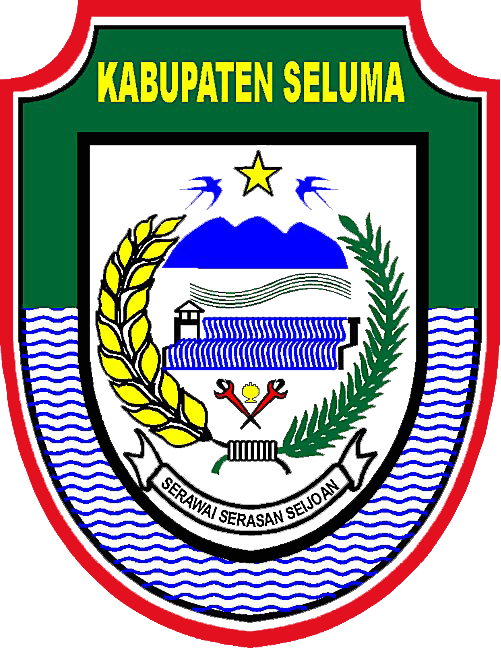
- Coat of arms
- Motto: Serawai Serasan Seijoan (One Cluster, One Consensus, and One Deliberation)
- Country: Indonesia
- Province: Bengkulu
- Regency seat: Pasar Tais

Government
  - Regent: Teddy Rahman
  - Vice Regent: Gustianto

Area
  - Total: 2,479.36 km^{2} (957.29 sq mi)

Population (mid 2025 estimate)
  - Total: 217,399
  - Density: 87.6835/km^{2} (227.099/sq mi)
- Time zone: UTC+7 (WIB)
- Website: selumakab.go.id

Seluma Regency is a regency of Bengkulu Province, Indonesia, on the west coast of the island of Sumatra. It was created on 25 February 2003 from what were formerly the northwestern districts of the South Bengkulu Regency. The regency seat is at the town of Pasar Tais. It covers an area of 2,479.36 km^{2}, and had a population of 173,507 at the 2010 Census and 207,877 at the 2020 Census; the official estimate as at mid 2025 was 217,399 (comprising 111,883 males and 105,516 females).

== Bordering areas ==
The regency borders South Bengkulu Regency to the southeast, the Indian Ocean to the southwest, Bengkulu (city) and Central Bengkulu Regency to the northwest, and South Sumatra Province (Empat Lawang Regency and Lahat Regency) to the northeast.

== Administrative districts ==
The Regency is divided into fourteen districts (Indonesian: kecamatan), tabulated below with their areas and their populations at the 2010 Census and the 2020 Census, together with the official estimates as at mid 2025. The table also includes the locations of the district administrative centres, the number of administrative villages in each district (totalling 182 rural desa and 20 urban kelurahan), and its post code.

Kode Wilayah	Name of District (kecamatan)	Area in km^{2}	Pop'n Census 2010	Pop'n Census 2020	Pop'n Estimate mid 2025	Admin centre	No. of villages	Post code
14.05.05	Semidang Alas Maras	120.87	20,801	25,066	26,100	Kembang Mumpo	26 ^{(a)}	38875
14.05.04	Semidang Alas	508.65	13,591	15,688	15,963	Pajar Bulan	24 ^{(b)}	38873
14.05.03	Talo	111.89	10,591	12,224	12,597	Masmanbang	16 ^{(c)}	38874
14.05.14	Ilir Talo (Lower Talo)	113.85	13,135	15,818	16,917	Padang Cekur	15	38887
14.05.12	Talo Kecil (Little Talo)	91.22	9,259	10,838	11,519	Sukamerindu	11	38888
14.05.13	Ulu Talo (Upper Talo)	328.54	4,816	6,049	6,530	Air Keruh	13	38886
14.05.02	Seluma	27.41	8,344	10,111	11,117	Tais	7 ^{(d)}	38876
14.05.11	Seluma Selatan (South Seluma)	80.43	10,588	13,713	14,386	Rimbo Kedul	12 ^{(e)}	38878
14.05.08	Seluma Barat (West Seluma)	87.60	7,798	9,846	10,404	Pagar Agung	9	38883
14.05.09	Seluma Timur (East Seluma)	77.08	8,901	10,933	11,579	Selebar	8 ^{(f)}	38885
14.05.10	Seluma Utara (North Seluma)	320.99	7,736	9,320	9,532	Puguk	10 ^{(g)}	38884
14.05.01	Sukaraja	189.46	29,740	32,981	34,654	Sukaraja	21 ^{(h)}	38877
14.05.06	Air Periukan	163.81	18,526	23,500	23,778	Dermayu	16 ^{(i)}	38881
14.05.07	Lubuk Sandi	257.56	9,681	11,790	12,323	Rena Panjang	14	38882
	Totals	2,479.36	173,507	207,877	217,399	Pasar Tais	202	

Notes: (a) including the kelurahan of Kembang Mumpo. (b) including the kelurahan of Pajar Bulan.
(c) including the kelurahan of Masmambang.
(d) all 7 are kelurahan - Dusun Baru, Lubuk Kebur, Lubuk Lintang, Napal, Pasar Tais, Talang Dantuk and Talang Saling.
(e) including 3 kelurahan - Padang Rambun, Rimbo Kedui and Sido Mulyo.
(f) including 3 kelurahan - Bunga Mas, Selebar and Sembayat. (g) including the kelurahan of Puguk.
(h) including 2 kelurahan - Babatan and Sukaraja. (i) including the kelurahan of Dermayu.
