= Lebong Regency =

Regency in Bengkulu, Indonesia

Coordinates: 3.2428°S 102.3349°E

Lebong Regency Kabupaten Lebong
- Regency
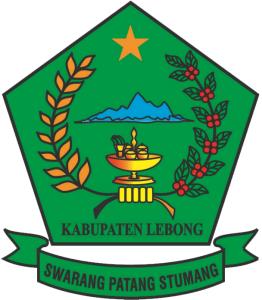
- Seal
- Motto(s): Swarang Patang Stumang (Together Without Leaving Each Other)
- Country: Indonesia
- Province: Bengkulu
- Regency seat: Tubei

Government
  - Regent: Azhari
  - Vice Regent: Bambang Agus Suprabudi

Area
  - Total: 1,667.05 km^{2} (643.65 sq mi)

Population (mid 2025 estimate)
  - Total: 113,140
  - Density: 67.868/km^{2} (175.78/sq mi)
- Time zone: UTC+7 (WIB)

Lebong is an inland regency of Bengkulu Province, Indonesia, on the island of Sumatra. It lies on the eastern slopes of the Barisan Mountains, the main watershed of Sumatra, thus draining towards the island's east coast. It covers an area of 1,667.05 km^{2}, and had a population of 97,091 at the 2010 Census and 106,293 at the 2020 Census; the official estimate as at mid 2025 was 113,140 (comprising 57,789 males and 55,351 females). Contrary to the popularly held belief that the town of Muara Aman is the seat of the government of Lebong Regency, the regency's capital is actually located in neighboring Tubei District (previously known as Pelabai), where all the offices and judiciary institutions are situated.

== History ==
Until 1966 the regency, together with the rest of what is now Bengkulu Province, was part of South Sumatra Province. It formed part of Rejang Lebong Regency until 25 February 2003, when the northwestern districts of that regency were split off to create the new Lebong Regency.

== Administrative districts ==
The Regency is divided into twelve districts (kecamatan), listed below with their areas and their populations at the 2010 Census and the 2020 Census, together with the official estimates as at mid 2025. The table also includes the locations of the district administrative centres, and the number of villages in each district (totaling 93 rural desa and 11 urban kelurahan), and its post code.

Kode Wilayah	Name of District (kecamatan)	Area in km^{2}	Pop'n Census 2010	Pop'n Census 2020	Pop'n Estimate mid 2025	Admin centre	No. of villages	Post code
17.07.05	Rimbo Pengadang	85.71	4,653	4,651	4,860	Rimbo Pengadang	6 ^{(a)}	39261
17.07.06	Topos	344.28	5,770	6,435	6,778	Topos	8 ^{(a)}	39260
17.07.04	Lebong Selatan (South Lebong)	213.46	13,490	15,066	15,881	Tes	10 ^{(b)}	39258
17.07.07	Bingin Kuning	86.89	9,631	10,598	11,146	Bungin	9	39262
17.07.03	Lebong Tengah (Central Lebong)	70.96	10,078	11,014	11,567	Embong Panjang	11 ^{(a)}	39263
17.07.08	Lebong Sakti	88.69	8,296	9,197	9,678	Ujung Tanjung	9	39267
17.07.02	Lebong Atas (Upper Lebong)	36.00	4,410	5,839	6,495	Tabeak Blau	6	39265
17.07.09	Tubei	40.71	6,087	7,521	8,326	Tanjung Agung	8 ^{(a)}	39266
17.07.01	Lebong Utara (North Lebong)	32.10	15,522	16,574	17,354	Muara Aman	12 ^{(c)}	39259
17.07.10	Amen	17.29	6,826	8,386	9,206	Amen	10 ^{(a)}	39264
17.07.11	Uram Jaya	42.95	5,084	5,438	5,697	Tangua	7	39268
17.07.12	Pinang Belapis	608.01	4,467	5,574	6,152	Ketenong 1	8	39269
	Totals	1,667.05	97,091	106,293	113,140	Tubei	104	

Notes: (a) includes one kelurahan (the administrative centre, as named). (b) comprises 4 kelurahan (Mubai, Taba Anyar, Tes and Turan Lalang) and 6 desa.
(c) includes 2 kelurahan (Kampung Jawa Baru and Pasar Muara Aman).

).
