= Kepahiang (town) =

- Town
- Interactive map of Kepahiang
- Country: Indonesia
- Province: Bengkulu
- Regency: Kepahiang Regency

Area
  - Total: 63.68 km^{2} (24.59 sq mi)

Population (mid 2023)
  - Total: 53,883
  - Density: 846.2/km^{2} (2,192/sq mi)
- Time zone: UTC+7 (WIB)
- Area code: +62 732

Kepahiang is a town, district, and the regency seat of Kepahiang Regency in Bengkulu Province of Indonesia.

With population of 53,883 in mid 2024 and population density of around 846 people per square kilometre, it is the most populous and most densely populated district in the regency. It is the administrative and economic centre of Kepahiang Regency. It borders Ujan Mas District in the north, Kabawetan and Tebat Karai Districts in the east, Seberang Musi District in the south, and Central Bengkulu Regency in the west.

== Climate ==
Climate data for Kepahiang (elevation 517 m (1,696 ft), 1991–2020 normals)
Month	Jan	Feb	Mar	Apr	May	Jun	Jul	Aug	Sep	Oct	Nov	Dec	Year
Record high °C (°F)	32.1 (89.8)	31.8 (89.2)	32.5 (90.5)	32.1 (89.8)	32.7 (90.9)	33.2 (91.8)	33.0 (91.4)	32.2 (90.0)	32.4 (90.3)	34.2 (93.6)	32.6 (90.7)	31.3 (88.3)	34.2 (93.6)
Mean daily maximum °C (°F)	28.9 (84.0)	29.2 (84.6)	29.5 (85.1)	29.7 (85.5)	29.9 (85.8)	29.7 (85.5)	29.4 (84.9)	29.4 (84.9)	29.5 (85.1)	29.4 (84.9)	29.2 (84.6)	28.7 (83.7)	29.4 (84.9)
Daily mean °C (°F)	24.4 (75.9)	24.5 (76.1)	24.8 (76.6)	25.1 (77.2)	25.1 (77.2)	24.8 (76.6)	24.5 (76.1)	24.5 (76.1)	24.6 (76.3)	24.6 (76.3)	24.5 (76.1)	24.3 (75.7)	24.6 (76.3)
Mean daily minimum °C (°F)	20.3 (68.5)	20.2 (68.4)	20.3 (68.5)	20.6 (69.1)	20.6 (69.1)	20.1 (68.2)	19.7 (67.5)	19.7 (67.5)	19.9 (67.8)	20.2 (68.4)	20.4 (68.7)	20.3 (68.5)	20.2 (68.4)
Record low °C (°F)	17.0 (62.6)	14.0 (57.2)	15.1 (59.2)	16.1 (61.0)	17.0 (62.6)	15.6 (60.1)	15.7 (60.3)	16.3 (61.3)	14.5 (58.1)	15.9 (60.6)	16.0 (60.8)	17.1 (62.8)	14.0 (57.2)
Average precipitation mm (inches)	346.3 (13.63)	320.9 (12.63)	347.8 (13.69)	319.4 (12.57)	212.1 (8.35)	142.2 (5.60)	128.8 (5.07)	107.3 (4.22)	140.1 (5.52)	253.2 (9.97)	371.2 (14.61)	411.9 (16.22)	3,101.2 (122.09)
Average precipitation days (≥ 1.0 mm)	21.9	18.6	21.8	20.6	17.4	13.6	14.5	13.1	14.9	18.8	22.8	24.2	222.2
Mean monthly sunshine hours	88.3	90.0	111.6	111.1	125.6	130.3	138.1	134.7	113.0	92.8	80.4	75.6	1,291.5
Source: World Meteorological Organization
