= Rejang Lebong Regency =

Regency in Bengkulu, Indonesia

Coordinates: 3°28′S 102°32′E

Rejang Lebong Regency Kabupaten Rejang Lebong
- Regency
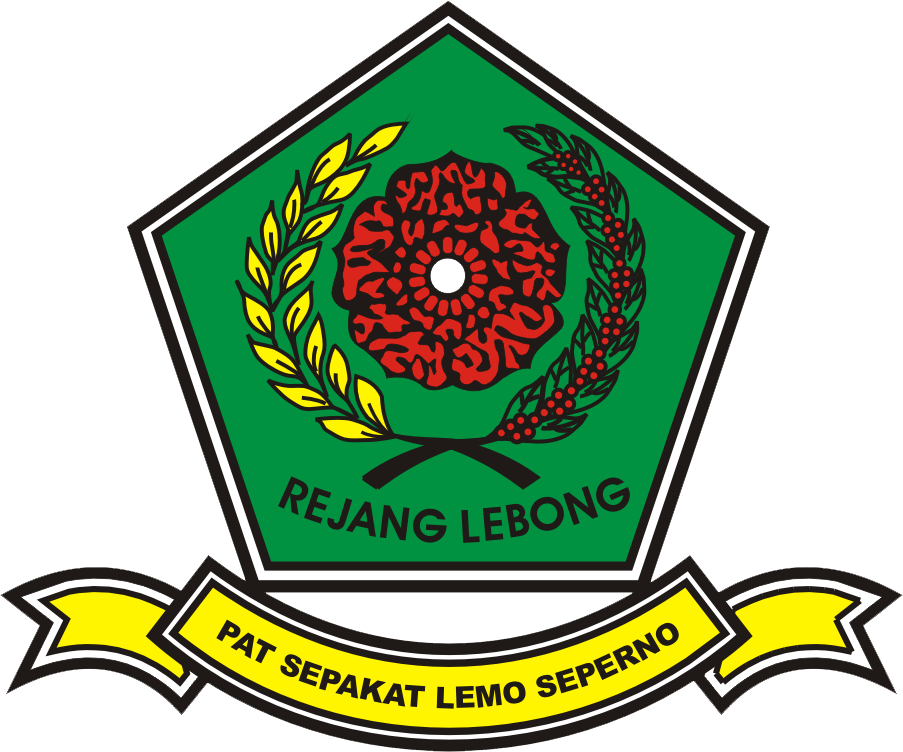
- Seal
- Motto: Pat Sepakat Lemo Seperno (Four Agree Five Perfect)
- Country: Indonesia
- Province: Bengkulu
- Regency seat: Curup

Government
  - Regent: Muhammad Fikri Thobari
  - Vice Regent: Hendri

Area
  - Total: 1,550.26 km^{2} (598.56 sq mi)

Population (mid 2025 estimate)
  - Total: 291,897
  - Density: 188.289/km^{2} (487.666/sq mi)
- Time zone: UTC+7 (WIB)

Rejang Lebong (Kabupaten Rejang Lebong) is a regency of Bengkulu Province, Indonesia, on the island of Sumatra. This regency originally included a much larger part of the inland part of the province, lying to the east of the watershed of the Barisan Mountains, but on 25 February 2003 it was divided in three, with districts in the northwest being split off to form a separate Lebong Regency, and districts in the south being similarly split off to form a new Kepahiang Regency.

The residual Rejang Lebong Regency now covers 1,550.26 km² and had a population of 246,787 at the 2010 Census and 276,645 at the 2020 Census; the official estimate as at mid 2025 was 291,897 (comprising 148,591 males and 143,306 females). The administrative centre of the Rejang Lebong Regency is the town of Curup. The Rejangese people are the most numerous ethnic group in Bengkulu Province, and inhabit the western half of the Regency, while the Lembak people inhabit the eastern half.

== Administrative districts ==
The Regency is divided into fifteen districts (Indonesian: kecamatan), tabulated below with their areas and populations at the 2010 Census and the 2020 Census, together with the official estimates as at mid 2025. The table also includes the locations of the district administrative centres, the number of villages in each district (totaling 122 rural desa and 34 urban kelurahan), and its post codes.

Kode Wilayah	Name of District (kecamatan)	Area in km^{2}	Pop'n 2010 Census	Pop'n 2020 Census	Pop'n mid 2025 Estimate	Admin centre	No. of desa	No. of kelu- rahan	Post code
17.02.09	Curup (Curup town)	5.21	28,173	26,971	26,697	Pasar Baru	-	9	39111: 39125
17.02.16	Curup Utara (North Curup)	47.09	14,623	18,668	20,796	Tunas Harapan	12	2	39119: 39125
17.02.17	Curup Timur (East Curup)	10.33	20,139	25,787	28,768	Talang Ulu	5	4	39115: 39125
17.02.18	Curup Selatan (South Curup)	35.90	18,792	23,355	25,681	Lubuk Ubar	9	2	39112: 39125
17.02.19	Curup Tengah (Central Curup)	19.05	34,182	34,935	34,946	Air Bang	1	9	39113: 39125
	Curup urban area	116.77	115,909	129,716	136,888		27	26	
17.02.10	Bermani Ulu	121.14	11,530	13,643	14,650	Kampung Melayu	12	-	39152
17.02.24	Bermani Ulu Raya	207,99	9,987	11,823	12,698	Tebat Tenong Luar	10	-	39151
17.02.11	Selupu Rejang	165.30	27,522	36,045	40,653	Air Duku	13	3	39153
17.02.08	Sindang Kelingi	68.84	14,079	13,366	13,230	Beringin Tiga	9	1	39155
17.02.22	Sindang Dataran	80.79	10,032	10,417	10,501	Bengko	6	-	39154
17.02.06	Kota Padang	190.39	11,816	12,412	12,582	Kota Padang	7	3	39183
17.02.23	Sindang Beliti Ilir	167.59	8,716	9,123	9,232	Lubuk Belimbing I	10	-	39184
17.02.07	Padang Ulak Tanding	242.97	17,454	19,781	20,802	Padang Ulak Tanding	14	1	39180
17.02.20	Bindu Riang	44.47	7,874	8,919	9,377	Simpang Beliti	5	-	39182
17.02.21	Sindang Beliti Ulu	143.22	11,868	11,400	11,284	Lubuk Alai	9	-	39181
	Totals	1,550.26	246,787	276,645	291,897	Curup	122	34	

The Curup urban area, together with the three districts to its north (Bermani Ulu, Bermani Ulu Raya and Selupu Rejang) comprise the western part of the regency, covering 611.20 km^{2} with a population of 204,889 in mid 2025, mainly the Rejong people. The remaining seven districts comprise the larger but less densely populated eastern part of the regency, covering 939.08 km^{2} with a population of 87,008 in mid 2025, primarily the Lembak people.
