= Central Bengkulu Regency =

Regency in Bengkulu, Indonesia

Coordinates: 3.2068°S 102.1262°E

Central Bengkulu Regency Kabupaten Bengkulu Tengah
- Regency
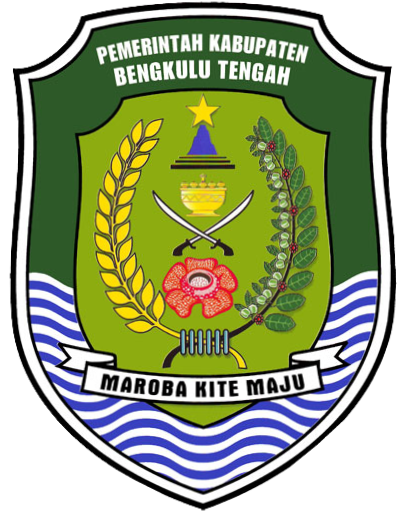
- Coat of arms
- Motto: Maroba Kite Maju (Together We Go Forward)
- Country: Indonesia
- Province: Bengkulu
- Regency seat: Karang Tinggi

Government
  - Regent: Rachmat Riyanto
  - Vice Regent: Tarmizi

Area
  - Total: 1,223.94 km^{2} (472.57 sq mi)

Population (mid 2025 estimate)
  - Total: 127,669
  - Density: 104.310/km^{2} (270.161/sq mi)
- Time zone: UTC+7 (WIB)

Central Bengkulu Regency (Kabupaten Bengkulu Tengah) is a regency of Bengkulu Province, Indonesia. It is located on the west coast of the island of Sumatra, and lies immediately to the north and the east of the adjacent city of Bengkulu. It was formed on 24 June 2008 by being split away from the neighbouring North Bengkulu Regency. It covers an area of 1,223.94 km^{2} and had a population of 98,333 at the 2010 census and 116,706 at the 2020 census; the official estimate as at mid 2025 was 127,669 (comprising 65,288 males and 62,381 females). The administrative centre is at the town of Karang Tinggi.

== Administrative districts ==
At the time of the 2010 census, the regency was divided into ten districts (kecamatan), but an eleventh district (Semidang Lagan) was added subsequently. The districts are detailed below with their areas and their populations at the 2010 census and the 2020 census, together with the official estimates as at mid 2025. The table includes the locations of the district administrative centres, the number of villages in each district (a total of 142 rural desa and a single urban kelurahan - the latter being the town of Taba Penanjung in the district of the same name), and its post code.

Kode Wilayah	Name of District (kecamatan)	Area in km^{2}	Pop'n 2010 census	Pop'n 2020 census	Pop'n mid 2025 estimate	Admin centre	No. of villages	Post code
17.09.02	Talang Empat	53.91	12,982	12,130	13,516	Kembang Seri	10	38385
17.09.11	Semidang Lagan	80.59	^{(a)}	5,677	6,031	Lagan Bungin	11	38382, 38385, 38388
17.09.01	Karang Tinggi	110.59	11,235	12,415	13,639	Ujung Karang	13	38382
17.09.06	Taba Penanjung	134.38	10,826	11,556	12,544	Bajak I	13	38388
17.09.07	Merigi Kelindang	98.42	6,255	7,125	7,760	Lubuk Unen Baru	13	38386
17.09.05	Pagar Jati	188.57	5,690	7,034	7,519	Keroya	14	38381
17.09.08	Merigi Sakti	99.93	5,616	6,141	6,830	Arga Indah II	15	38383
17.09.03	Pondok Kelapa	165.20	25,222	30,049	33,126	Pekik Nyaring	17	38371
17.09.09	Pondok Kubang	92.00	7,888	10,609	11,270	Pondok Kubang	12	38375: 38378
17.09.04	Pematang Tiga	129.64	6,681	7,296	8,203	Pematang Tiga	13	38370
17.09.10	Bang Haji	70.71	5,938	6,674	7,240	Sekayun	12	38372
	Totals	1,223.94	98,333	116,706	127,669	Ujung Karang	143	
