= Kepahiang Regency =

Regency in Bengkulu, Indonesia

Coordinates: 3°39′52.46″S 102°33′3.21″E

Kepahiang Regency Kabupaten Kepahiang
- Regency
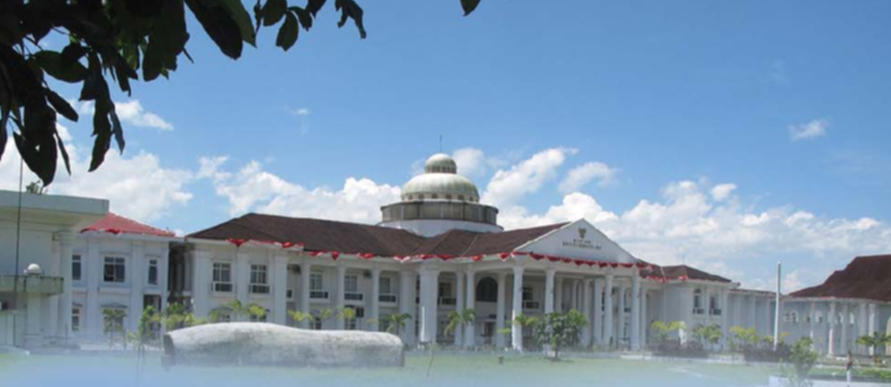
- Assembly House of Kepahiang Regency

- Coat of arms
- Motto: Sehasen
- Location within Bengkulu
- Country: Indonesia
- Province: Bengkulu
- Regency seat: Kepahiang

Government
  - Regent: Zurdi Nata
  - Vice Regent: Abdul Hafizh

Area
  - Total: 710.11 km^{2} (274.18 sq mi)
- Highest elevation: 1,600 m (5,200 ft)
- Lowest elevation: 250 m (820 ft)

Population (mid 2025 estimate)
  - Total: 153,454
  - Density: 216.10/km^{2} (559.69/sq mi)
- Time zone: UTC+7 (WIB)
- Website: kepahiangkab.go.id

Kepahiang is a regency in Bengkulu Province of Indonesia. It is located on the island of Sumatra, and was created on 25 February 2003 by splitting off the areas of the former southern districts of Rejang Lebong Regency. It covers an area of 710.11 km^{2}, of which a high percentage (27%) is still forest; thus it is the smallest (by area) of the province's regencies. It had a population of 124,865 at the 2010 Census and 149,298 at the 2020 Census; the official estimate as at mid 2025 was 153,454 (comprising 79,124 males and 74,330 females). The regency seat is Kepahiang town. The local population consists of various ethnic groups such as the Rejang, Serawai, Javanese, Lembak and Sundanese, among which Rejang forms the majority in Kepahiang.

The Regency of Kepahiang is rich in natural resources including gold, coal, geothermal energy resources, gemstones as well as a range of agricultural, aquacultural and forest products. These include rice, oil- and coconut palms, coffee, tea, corn, wood, natural rubber and pepper, as well as various types of fruits and locally bred fish specimens and products.

The local government of Kepahiang operates several development projects to achieve improvements in the sector of agriculture, energy supply and education. Some of these initiatives gained nationwide attention and were implemented by the central government in Jakarta on a national scale.

Besides the formerly mentioned potentials, Kepahiang has significant tourism potential, which remains largely untapped. It is one of the official development goals to foster tourism in Kepahiang.

== History ==
=== Colonial rule ===
During the colonial rule of the Dutch in Indonesia, the town of Kepahiang was the capital of the regency of Rejang Lebong, which is a neighboring regency of Kepahiang today. Kepahiang remained the capital during the 3.5 years of Japanese rule in Indonesia. In the cause of the independence war and Indonesia's declaration of independence on 17 August 1945, Kepahiang became the regional center for Indonesian organisations, the independence movement in the region and its military forces. Due to this fact, the Dutch targeted and destroyed the entire administrative infrastructure in Kepahiang during an attempt to regain power over the region in 1948. The mayors office, administrative buildings, post offices, telecommunication centres and police stations were annihilated completely.

In 1949, the local administration was forced to relocate itself into the forest and was not able to return to Kepahiang as the infrastructure no longer existed. Because of this, the administration had to move to the larger town of Curup, which provided sufficient infrastructure at that time. In 1956, Curup was declared the new capital of Rejang Lebong Regency, and Kepahiang finally lost its prior position as the administrative center.

=== Reformation in 1998 to present ===
In the context of political and administrative reforms in Indonesia that started in 1998, Kepahiang had a realistic chance to become an independent regency. In 1999 a firm proposal was made to transform Kepahiang into such an independent regency, separate from Rejang Lebong Regency. The people of Kepahiang supported this by forming an organisation, namely the Panitia Persiapan Kabupaten Kepahiang (PPKK), which fostered the realisation of this project. In 2002 the PPKK handed over their proposals to respective regional and national authorities. This was accepted and finally ratified by General Hari Sabarno, who served as the Minister of Interior at that time, and came into effect at 7 January 2004.

Since then Kepahiang has had four local administrations under three different regents.

The newly formed regency progressed socially and economically since then at high pace. Its administration (4th period) received several honours from the central government in Jakarta and managed that locally applied development concepts were adapted by the government and implemented on a national scale. Kepahiang adopted a sustainable approach avoiding huge monocultural plantations such as palm oil plantations. It depends on its sensitive natural environment and understand that it has to maintain and protect it properly in order to achieve long-lasting success.

=== Crest ===
The pentagonal frame of Kepahiang's crest reflects its territorial entity, as well as the Pancasila doctrine taught in Indonesia. The crest further contains elements that reflect certain natural and cultural characteristics of Kepahiang.

In the upper part of the crest there is the contour of mountains, illustrating that Kepahiang is a mountainous regency. Below that, one can see a wavelike symbol signifying Kepahiang's abundant water resources. The blue point between the waves is a symbol of the day Kepahiang became an independent regency.

In the middle is a betel nut paring. The paring plays an important role in local traditions and customs. Above the paring there is a curved blade of a traditional dagger called kris. The kris is a symbol of bravery and tradition, but also represents progress and development.

The paring and the kris are enframed by two different branches on the left and on the right. One of the branches is from a coffee tree, whereas the second branch is from a rice plant. Both reflect the favourable natural environment in Kepahiang, which provides its inhabitants with sufficient subsistence. The tranches are bound together seven times as a symbol for the regency's coherence.

At the bottom of the crest there is a writing showing the word SEHASEN. This word is a local acronym for the following combination: Selaras (Consistency) Elok (Beauty) Harmonis (Harmony) Aman (Safety) Sentosa (Peacefulness).

== Geography and location ==
=== Location ===
Kepahiang has the following coordinates: Longitude 101° 55′ 19″ – 103° 01′ 29″; Latitude 020° 43′ 07″ – 030° 46′ 48″. Kepahiang is characterized by a rangy, arboreous and fertile natural environment. The highest point is 1,600 metres above sea level where the lowest point is 250 metres above sea level. The rangy environment is reflected in the crest of Kepahiang.

=== Climate ===
The climate is tropical. The average temperature is 23.87 °C whereas the air humidity is 85.21% in average. The average rainfall amounts to 233.5 mm/ month.

=== Area ===
Kepahiang has a total area of 710.11 km^{2} of which 48,393.69 ha cultivatable and further 18,106.31 ha of forest area. The forest area consists of a mountainous conservation area of 320 ha, a natural park of 8,515 ha and an area of protected forest of 9,588.11 ha.

=== Inland waters ===
There are several rivers and a lake in Kepahiang Regency, which are vital to the local agricultural economy and the tourism potential as well. Kepahiang does not have a shortage of water resources, which is why water was an element used in its crest as well. Ten waterfalls have been counted, which would be suitable spots for recreational activities and tourism. The waterfall in Curug Embun is around 100 metres high and a regional place for excursions, just as the Musi River, which has significant water volumes allowing a 3 × 70 MW water power plant to function properly.

=== Vegetation ===
The south of Sumatra and the province of Bengkulu and Kepahiang in particular are the natural habitat for Rafflesia arnoldii flower. This flower was found by Joseph Arnoldi and Sir Thomas Raffles in 1818. Raffles was the governor of the province of Bengkulu at that time. The florescence of this flower is the biggest in the world. Its cross-section dimension can be up to 1 meter and it weighs up to 11 kg. The flower is interesting and adds to the tourism potential of the region.

=== Neighbouring regencies ===
In the north Kepahiang Regency borders on the regency of Rejang Lebong. To the east there is the regency of Lahat. The regency of Central Bengkulu is located to the south from the regency of Kepahiang, whereas Kepahiang adjoins the regency of North Bengkulu in the west.

=== Administrative divisions ===
Kepahiang Regency is subdivided into eight districts (kecamatan) comprising a total of 117 villages (of which 11 have urban status). The districts are listed below with their areas and their populations at the 2010 Census and the 2020 Census, together with the official estimates as at mid 2025. The table also includes the locations of the district administrative centres, the number of villages in each district (totaling 105 rural desa and 12 urban kelurahan), and its post code.

Kode Wilayah	Name of District (kecamatan)	Area in km^{2}	Pop'n Census 2010	Pop'n Census 2020	Pop'n Estimate mid 2025	Admin centre	No. of desa	No. of kelu- rahan	Post code
17.08.08	Muara Kemumu	163.82	12,378	13,920	12,010	Batu Kalung	8	-	39375
17.08.01	Bermani Ilir	93.51	13,612	14,782	15,036	Keban Agung	18 ^{(a)}	1	39374
17.08.07	Seberang Musi	107.83	6,412	7,760	8,115	Lubuk Sahung	13	-	39377
17.08.03	Tebat Karai	66.33	12,493	14,710	15,375	Taba Saling	13 ^{(b)}	1	39373
17.08.04	Kepahiang	63.68	40,360	50,560	52,334	Pasar Ujung ^{(c)}	16 ^{(c)}	7	39372
17.08.06	Kabawetan	95.40	10,601	12,902	13,979	Tangsi Baru	14 ^{(d)}	1	39376
17.08.02	Ujan Mas	106.51	19,261	22,757	24,868	Ujan Mas Atas	16 ^{(e)}	1	39370
17.08.05	Merigi	13.03	9,748	11,907	11,737	Durian Depun	7 ^{(f)}	1	39371
	Totals	710.11	124,865	149,298	153,454	Kepahiang	105	12	

Notes: (a) including the kelurahan of Keban Agung. (b) including the kelurahan of Tebat Karai.
(c) comprising 7 kelurahan (Dusun Kepahiang, Kampung Pensiunan, Padang Lekat, Pasar Kepahiang, Pasar Sejantung, Pasar Ujung and Pensiunan) and 9 desa.
(d) including the kelurahan of Tangsi Baru. (e) including the kelurahan of Ujan Mas Atas. (f) including the kelurahan of Durian Depun.

The capital and administrative centre of the Regency of Kepahiang is the town (and district) of Kepahiang, which has over a third of the regency's inhabitants as well. The average population density was 216.1 people per km^{2} in 2024, while the districts significantly differ in this regard. Merigi District in the northwest of the regency is substantially suburban to the town of Curup in neighbouring Rejang Lebong Regency.

=== Demographic development ===
The population of Kepahiang Regency is growing at slow pace with an average of 1.01% per annum. There are 5% more men than women. Therefore, the demographic development in Kepahiang is significantly below the national average.

== Politics ==
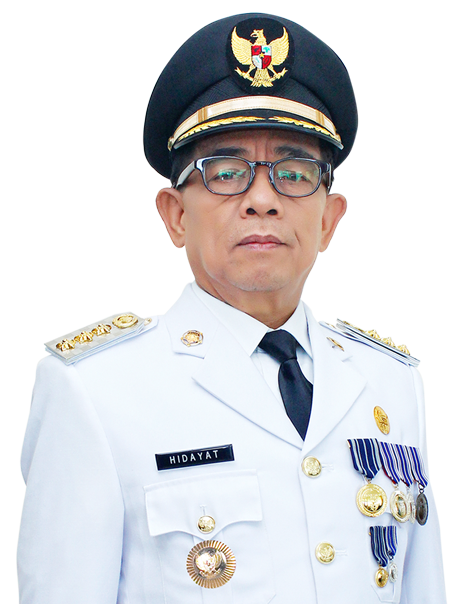
Acting and 2nd Regent Hidayatullah Sjahid

Since the transition of Kepahiang into an independent regency in the province of Bengkulu, four mayors have assumed office. The current mayor, Hidayatullah Sjahid, was appointed as Acting Regent in January 2004; after a gap of more than a decade, he was elected into office in February 2021.

- Establishment period: January 2004 – April 2005 → Acting Regent: Ir. Hidayatullah Sjahid, M.M.
- Establishment period: April–August 2005 → Acting Regent: Drs. Husni Hasanuddin
- Election period: August 2005 – August 2010 → Regent: Dr. H. Bando Amin C. Kader, M.M. /Vice-Regent: Abasri. Dj, S.Sos
- Election period: August 2010 – August 2015 → Regent: Drs. H. Bando Amin C. Kader, M.M. (re-elected) / Vice Regent: Bambang Sugianto, S.H., M.H.
- Election period: February 2016 – February 2021 → Regent: Ir. Hidayatullah Sjahid, M.M. / Vice Regent: Netti Herawati
- Election period: February 2021 – February 2024 → Regent: Ir. Hidayatullah Sjahid, M.M. (re-elected)/ Vice Regent: Zurdi Nata

The local government adopts an innovative approach to use the vast potentials of the Regency of Kepahiang. Declared priorities are:

- Agricultural programs, whereas a sustainable cultivation strategies are preferred (IKUTT & Seluna program).
- Education, which is fostered by extending local educational infrastructure, integration of external know-how and facilitation of advanced education in relevant sectors (by providing scholarships for instance)
- Health care, which was improved significantly by building one of the most advanced hospitals in the region (which is not yet fully operative).

== Culture ==
=== Cultural background and events ===
Kepahiang Regency's society is culturally, religiously and ethnically heterogeneous. The different religious groups and tribes coexist peacefully. The Rejang are the largest group in Kepahiang and dominate the local cultural life. Because the various groups have coexisted for a long time, cultural influences by others groups (Palembang, Serawai, Javanese, Sundanese, Padangnese, Batak, Acehnese or Chinese) can be identified as well. The heterogenous backgrounds of Kepahiang society caused the development of social aptitudes and manners within society, enabling peaceful coexistence.

Customs and traditions are maintained in Kepahiang. Cultural events take place regularly whereas it is not rare that foreign guest attend those events as well. The local cultural and heritage is closely bound the Malay culture. Due to this representatives of Malay culture, aristocrats and royalty not just from Indonesia but from Malaysia, Thailand and Philippines (Mindanao) for instance maintain good relations to Kepahiang and are regular guests there. They maintain the common cultural background and, at the same time, set an example of peaceful coexistence with groups of different cultural heritage.

=== Religion ===
There are several religious groups in Kepahiang. 88% of the population are Muslims. Further religions present in Kepahiang are Hinduism (7%), Catholicism (5%) and Buddhism (4%).

=== Music ===
Music concerts take place regularly in Kepahiang whereas groups of nationwide popularity perform there along with local groups. The annual birthday of the Regency of Kepahiang is celebrated and often a cause for music groups and artists come to Kepahiang. There is a range of traditional, folkly songs such as the Gritan-, Mambak-, Nyerambeak- and the Merjung song. These popular songs are part of the Rejang cultural heritage dominating Kepahiang.

=== Folk dance ===
The largest group in Kepahiang are the Rejang Kepahiang; hence their customs are dominant as well. The Rejang do have various types of folk dances such as the Sekapur Sirih, Kejei, Semamea Cupik, Petik Kopi (Coffee Harvesting), Panen Padi (Rice Harvesting) and the Bujang Semulen dance.

=== Sports ===
Due to its unique natural environment Kepahiang offers a range of recreational activities and outdoor activities such as trekking, biking, walking and alike. The local government regularly invites to common bicycle tours in order to encourage an active way of life. The natural park covers an area of 8,515 ha and provides for further possible outdoor activities for all those enjoying nature. Other types of sports such as soccer, badminton and a range of martial arts are practised in Kepahiang as well.

=== Mayor's office ===
The mayor's office in Kepahiang stands out in regards to dimensions and architectural design and attracts tourists as well as locals. The buildings cupola is of enormous size. It was damaged during a recent earthquake though all damages were of minor type and not irreparable. The restoration is done by non-local experts.

=== Hydro power plant / dam ===
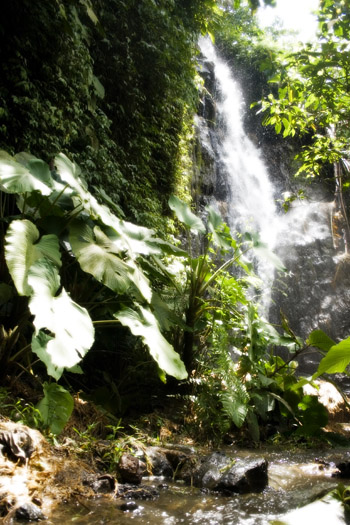
Cascade of Curug Embun in Kepahiang

The hydro power plant on the MusiRiver, which is about 11 kilometres away from the city if Kepahiang, has a capacity of 3 × 70 MW. Furthermore, the hydro power plant is located in a natural scenery. It therefore became a place of excursions for locals and visitors. However, the facility primary function is of course to pave the way for economic development in Kepahiang.

=== Waterfalls ===
The waterfalls in Kepahiang, especially the one in Curug Embun, which is approximately 100 metres high, are popular recreational places. The waterfall in Curug Embun is surrounded by forest and coffee fields of local peasants. It provides an exotic panorama view and is properly accessible by car or even public means of transportation. Its location is about 6 kilometres from the town of Kepahiang. The place is also popular with locals for its fresh climate and therefore became one of the primary place of excursions in the Regency of Kepahiang. Besides the waterfall in Curug Embun there are several more waterfalls such as those in Merindu, which are of similar characteristics but not that popular. Eight more cascades suitable to serve as natural recreational spots are counted in Kepahiang.

=== Rafflesia arnoldi and titan arum flowers ===
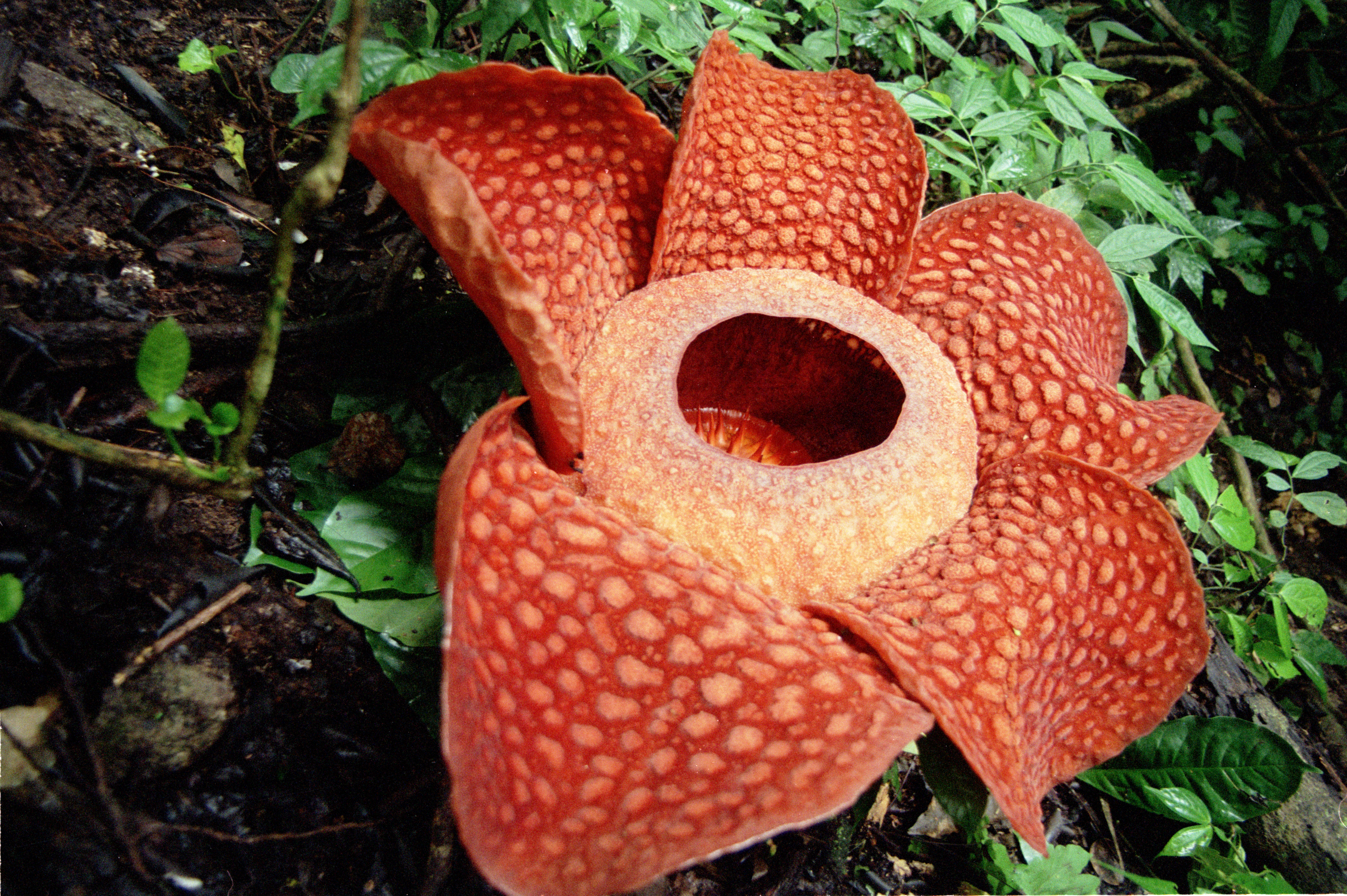
Rafflesia arnoldii

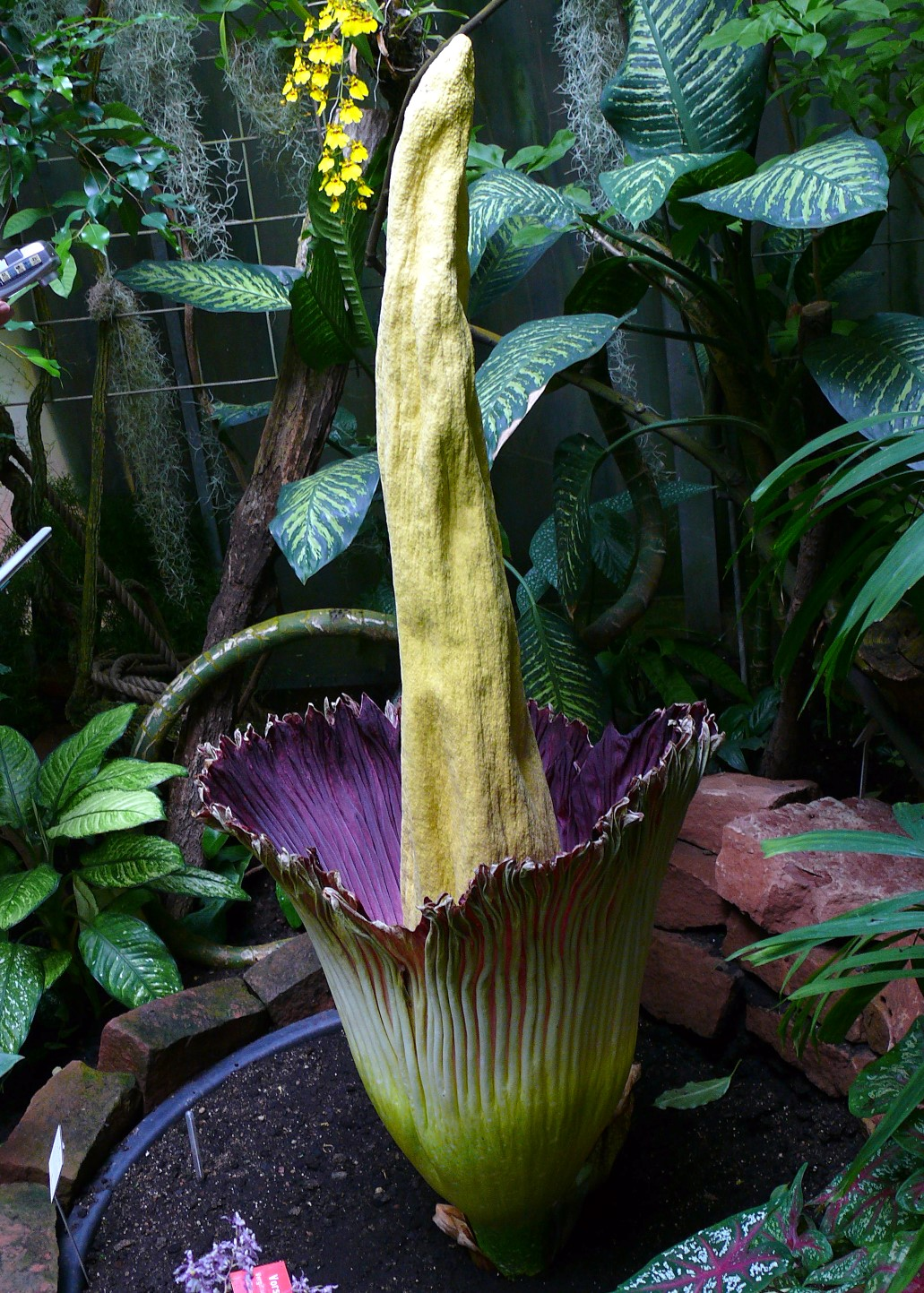
Titan arum

The largest flower in the world, Rafflesia arnoldii, has its natural habitat in Kepahiang and the Province of Bengkulu in south Sumatra. Its blossoḿs can be up to 1 meter in diameter and weigh up to 11 kg. Sporadic occurrence of this flower are reported from Aceh and parts of Malaysia. Furthermore, Kepahiang is also home to the Bangkai flower, a member of the genus Amorphophallus. The flower is of different types such as the Bangkai raksasa, Suweg raksasa or titan arum (Amorphophallus gigas), more commonly known as Sumatra giant amorphophallus. Amorphophallus titanum can reach a height of up to 6 meters and therefore is the highest flower in the world, followed by Amorphophallus gigas. These flowers give an impression of the unique natural environment found in the Regency of Kepahiang.

=== Tea plantations ===
The tea plantations in the district of Kabawetan offer fresh climate and a unique panorama view and therefore are a local attraction already suitable for visitors and tourists as well. The plantations are located approximately 9 kilometers from the city of Kepahiang.

== Local infrastructure & economy ==
=== Roads ===
There are 31.90 km highway roads in Kepahiang, which are of good quality in a provincial comparison. Besides that there are 54.15 km of asphalted roads.

=== Airports ===
The next airport is located in Bengkulu, which can be reached within 2 hours by car.

=== Media ===
The local government of Kepahiang has launched a magazine in 2011 called the Tabloid Warta Kepahiang. The magazine Tabloid Warta Kepahiang is available online as well. It serves two major goals. First, it is meant to spread relevant information within Kepahiang. Secondly, it shall provide reliable information about the Regency of Kepahiang, recent and ongoing programs as well as potentials and opportunities for interested investors and entrepreneurs. Right now, the magazine is available in Indonesian language only.

=== Health sector ===
Until just recently proper health care service were available in the neighbouring regency of Bengkulu only. This changed in 2012, when Kepahiang built his own public hospital. The hospital though is not yet fully operative. There are currently 74 hospitals beds available in Kepahiang. The hospital adheres to national standards but announced its plan to implement international standards in the future as well.

=== Education ===
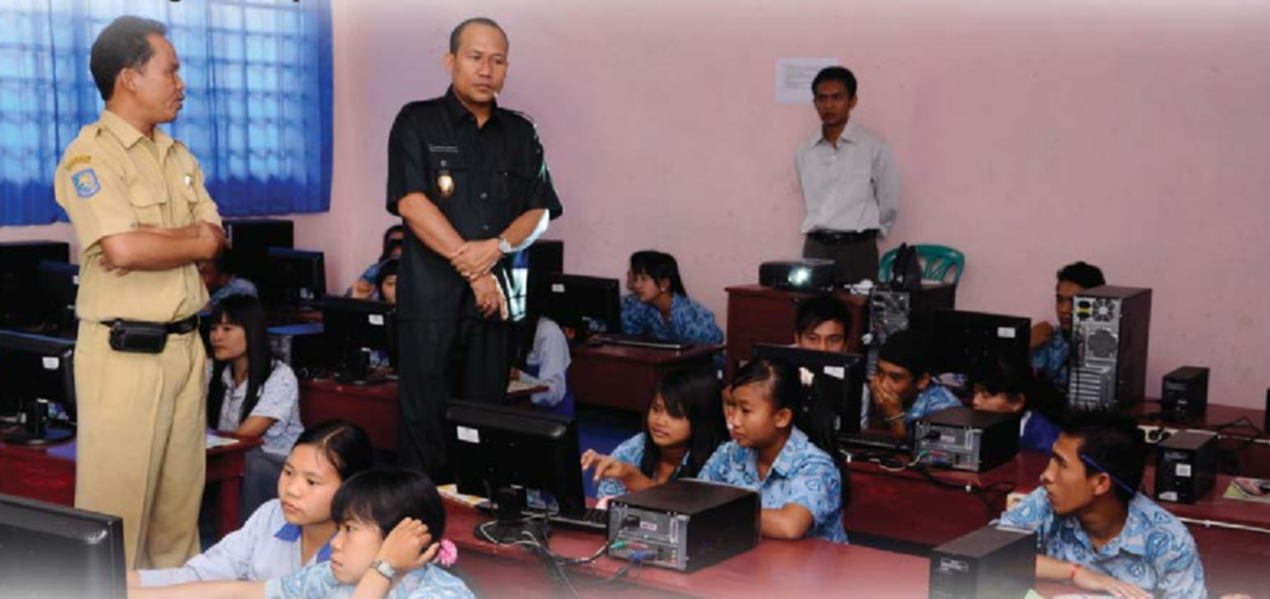
Vice Mayor (middle) visiting local school

Kepahiang offers a comprehensive school system in Kepahiang with 164 schools capable of preparing pupils for university as well. The nearest University is located in Bengkulu. Kepahiang is in need of specific expertise and know-how in order to use its full potentials. Due to this fact, the local government provides advanced educational programs including provision of scholarships for students willing to study majors related to geothermal energy supply and technology for instance.

=== Hotels ===
There are 3 hotels in Kepahiang with a total number of 55 rooms and 77 beds.

=== Economy ===
The local economy is based on the regencies natural resources, agriculture and plantations, horticulture as well as livestock and fish breeding. Many potentials in this regards are not yet tapped or require optimisation. Although there are no oil and gas reserves found in Kepahiang, the existing assets of the regency seem to provide a solid foundation for progressive economic development. The current challenge for the local government and farmers federations likewise is to balance the interest of large corporations and locals so that aspects such as market integration, internationalisation, the generation of local income and the agricultural diversification are brought into harmony. The dependency of local peasants on certain agricultural products such as coffee for instance shall be reduced by certain strategic agricultural programs. Programs like IKUTT and SELUNA do foster the aforementioned goals. IKUTT aims to structure the sector of livestock and fish breeding, horticulture and the cultivation of food plants whereas SELUNA is meant to manage and optimize the cultivation of sengon trees, dragon fruits and the production of luwak (civet cat) coffee.

=== Agriculture a plantations ===
A variety of agricultural products such as coffee, tea, corn, dragon fruits, manioc, pepper, oil- and coconut palms, pecan nuts, taro (talas), cloves and range of fruits for instance are cultivated in Kepahiang. Sengon is the primary forest product. This is a partial list of locally available products.

==== Coffee ====
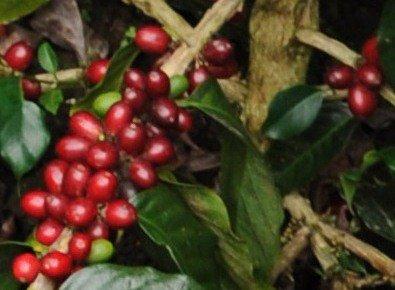
Coffee from Kepahiang

In 2009 coffee was grown on an area of 24,017 ha whereas a total number of 16,060 tons were harvested. The cultivated area increased in 2011 to 24,928 ha. Farmers grow both types of coffee, Arabica and Robusta. Besides the regular cultivation of coffee, farmers increasingly produce luwak coffee as well, which generates additional income for the farmers and therefore lessens the traditionally strong dependency on the annual harvests of coffee beans, which, besides the naturally caused fluctuations, is also subject to price fluctuation on the market. The luwak (civet) cat coffee of the Regency of Kepahiang is known to be of high quality and is among the most expensive types of coffee worldwide. The local government supports the production of Luwak Coffee within the framework of the SELUNA program. Luwak coffee is supported primarily by providing expertise on the subject to interested farmers.

==== Tea ====
On an area of 275 ha farmers grow Oolong tea, which is exported to Taiwan exclusively, as it the tea is of high quality and good taste. Olong means black dragon in Chinese which is a symbol for good things. The tea is exported as semi-fermented tea. Black tea is grown on another area of 650 ha, which is called Kabawetan tea in Indonesia.

==== Corn ====
In 2007 corn was grown on an area of 1,019 ha. 3,017 tons were harvested

==== Manioc ====
In 2007 manioc was grown on an area of 285 ha. 3,328 tons were harvested.

==== Taro ====
Taro (Talas Satoimo) is predominantly consumed in Japan whereas most of it is imported from China. However, there is still a shortage in Taro which cannot be covered by imports from China. Due to this fact, Kepahiang aims to grow Taro for the Japanese market. It is grown as a secondary plant next to Sengon trees for instance instead of monocultural plantations which would again create unfavourable dependencies for farmers. The shortage on the Japanese market amounts to 45,000 tons per annum and therefore constitutes significant economic potential for farmers in Kepahiang who can develop the capacities to serve this particular market. Taro is cultivated in line with the B.A.C.K. Model, which prescribes a sustainable cultivation strategy and provides organisational and financial options to farmers as well. It entails the complementary growing approach, combining Sengon and Taro cultivation. Taro is harvested after 5 month and therefore generates income to farmers prior to harvesting the Sengon trees. By that it diversifies the income structures of farmers and lessens dependencies.

==== Dragonfruits ====
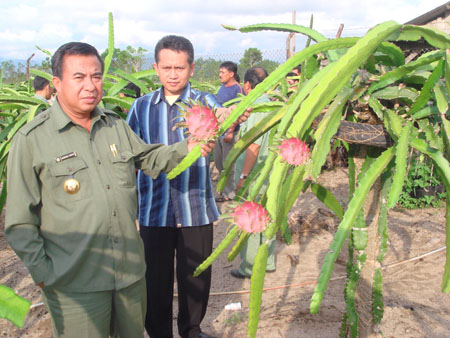
Mayor at dragonfruit plantation

Currently dragonfruits are grown on 18 ha. The fruits are meant to be sold on the market but also to process it to other products such as cosmetica and homeopathics. In the context of the SELUNA program, support, including financial support, is provided to farmers and federations from the local and the central government institutions. Dragonfruits are supposed to become another option for farmers diversifying their crops. An expert from Japan is providing assistance and needed know-how products.

==== Sengon (Paraserianthes falcataria) ====
Growing sengon (Falcataria moluccana) is an important part of Kepahiang strategy to diversify income structures in the Regency. Whereas oilpalms and natural rubber plantations need a rather long time until income is generated, sengon is of rapidly growing type serving farmers and investors with short and medium time horizon. Furthermore, the cultivation of sengon requires affordable investment volumes allowing local investors to participate in the sector. The SELUNA programs encourages farmers to grow sengon and provides certain types of support. The local governments approach to use the sustainable cultivation method of sengon to generate additional income and mitigate the risk of depending too much on single agricultural products gained recognition on a national scale and was eventually adopted by central government institutions as well.

Sengon can be grown in two major ways. First, it can be grown as a complementary plant at coffee plantations. The sengon trees, as a side effect, have protective functions for coffee plants. This strategy allows to plant 400 sengon trees per ha. Second, it can be grown as primary plant whereas this approach is divided into further subcategories: Category A: 1000–2000 trees / ha. This approach allows the growing of secondary plants such as Taro. Category B: 4000 trees / ha. This approach is called the High Density Population (HDP). Category C: 10,000 trees / ha. This approach is called the Very High Density Population (VHDP).

==== Cocoa ====
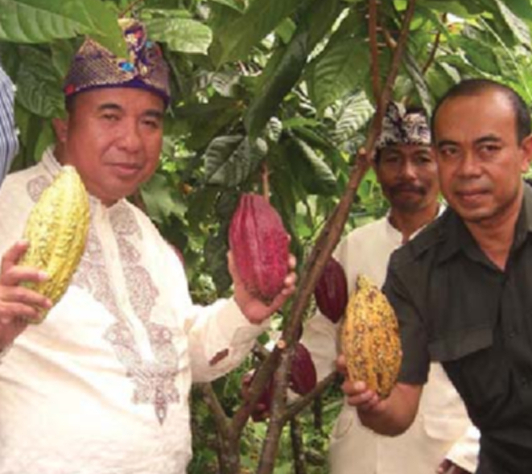
Cocoa Fields in Kepahiang

The conditions to grow highly qualitative cocoa in Kepahiang are good to ideal. Therefore, cocoa is of interest to private, corporate and public entrepreneurs and investors. The IKUTT program encourages farmers to grow cocoa as well. Cocoa is cultivated by approximately 7,000 farmers on an area of 8,393 ha containing at least 4.5 million cocoa plants. Cocoa is another crop that bears the potential to lessen farmers dependencies, as its cultivation is profitable even on relatively small fields and generates local income. The local government therefore wants to foster cocoa growing making Kepahiang one of the centres for qualitative cocoa from Indonesia. Financial programs further support farmers interested to grow cocoa.

==== Coconut ====
Smallholder's plantations covered an area of 384 ha on which coconut was cultivated. In 2009 311 tons were harvested. Plantations by larger corporations that might exist are not included.

==== Palm oil ====
Smallholdeŕs plantations covered an area of 40 ha on which oil palms were cultivated. In 2009 24 tons were harvested. Plantations by larger corporations that might exist are not included. Results of palm oil can export to several countries.

==== Natural rubber ====
Smallholdeŕs plantations covered an area of 35 ha on which natural rubbers was cultivated. In 2009 24 tons were harvested. Plantations by larger corporations that might exist are not included.

==== Pepper ====
Smallholdeŕs plantations covered an area of 2,949 ha on which pepper was cultivated. In 2009 1,962 tons were harvested. Plantations by larger corporations that might exist are not included.

==== Livestock and fish breeding ====
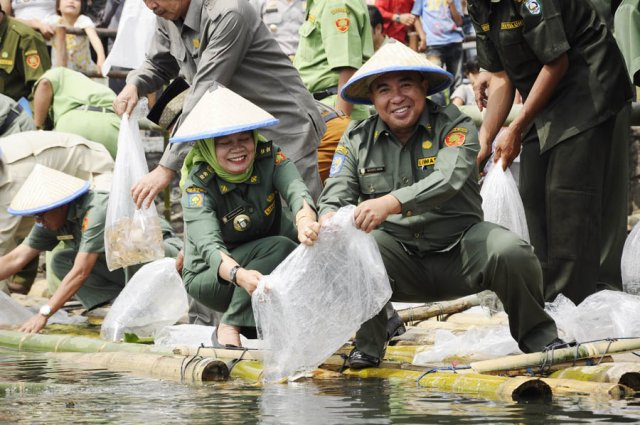
Mayor visit local fishfarm

The climate in Kepahiang is suitable for breeding various kinds of land animals and fish. Species that are currently bred in Kepahiang are goldfish, tilapia, cichlids and barbels. Pisciculture is still operated on a small scale level by locals. Therefore, the potential remains largely untapped. Besides pisciculture, diary and slaughter of cattle, goats, ducks and chicken are bred in Kepahiang as well. The livestock and fish farming is being funded under the program IKUTT serving as an additional source of income for locals.

=== Soil resources ===
There are various types of soil and mineral resources such as obsidian, gold, pumice, coal, tuff, clay and geothermal energy resources in Kepahiang. The reserves are of substantial quantity and quality likewise.

==== Obsidian ====
Obsidian reserves were confirmed at 2 locations (Batu Bandung, Kebon Agung) in Kepahiang. The reserve in Batu Bandung amounts to 20,000,000 tons of obsidian having the following specification: SiO_{2}=64–75% AI_{2}O_{3}=20.68% Fe_{2}O_{3}= 6.7% CaO=0.75% MgO=0.12% TiO_{2}=0.4%.

==== Coal ====
Coal reserves were confirmed at 3 locations in Kepahiang. The quality varies from 4,500 to 7,825 kcal /kg.

Specification of coal confirmed in the northern area of Bt. Sanggul 5,595–7,825 kcal / kg, ash 4.4–4.7%, sulfur 0.3–1.1%.

Specification of coal confirmed in the village of Taba Padang Lubuk Saung TM: 17.63%, IM : 11.83%, Ash : 14.96%, VM : 38.52%, FC : 35.11%, TS : 0.49%, GCV: 5,492.

The coal reserves confirmed in the village of Tanjung Alam has between 4,500 and 5,200 kcal/kg and has the following specifications: TM: 29.94%, IM: 12.93, Ash: 27.47%, VM: 32.15%.

==== Pumice ====
Pumice reserves were confirmed at 2 location, Keban Agung / Batu Bandung, and Keban Agung. At the first location in Keban Agung / Batu Bandung the reserves amount to 2,000,000 tons of the following specification: SiO_{2}=2.98% AI_{2}O_{3}=13.9% Fe_{2}O_{3}=0.94% Cao= 0.43% MgO=0.25% LOI=4.43% K_{2}O=3.16% Na_{2}O_{3}=3.66%. At the second location in Keban Agung reserves amount to 30,000,000 m^{3} of the following specifications: SiO_{2}=63.5% AI_{2}O_{3}=13% Fe_{2}O_{3}=8.7% CaO=5.92%.

==== Tuff ====
Tuff reserves were confirmed at one location and amount to 40,000,000 tons of the following specifications: SiO_{2}=63.15% AI_{2}O_{3}=13.70% CaO=5.92% MgO=0.65 LOI=4.25 K_{2}O=1.94% LOI=4.25% MgO=0.65%.

==== Clay ====
Clay reserves were confirmed at one location and amount to 1,200,000 m^{3} of the following specifications: SiO_{2}=62–75% AI_{2}O_{3}=20.68% Fe_{2}O_{3}=6.7% CaO=0.75% MgO=0.12% TiO_{2}=0.4%.

==== Kaolin ====
Kaolin reserves were confirmed at one location but were not quantified or specified.

==== Sulphur ====
Sulphur reserves were confirmed at one location and amount to 34,410,000 tons.

==== Gold ====
Gold reserves were confirmed at one location, but are not entirely specified or quantified. A survey conducted by the company PT. Aneka Tambang analysed an area of 6,000 ha. The survey indicates the existence of gold reserves in Simpang Jernih and found crystalline chert. The specification are as follows: Au = 0.1% – 0.13 ppm, Ag = 7–69 ppm, Cu = 240–666 ppm, Pb = 547 ppm – 0.12%, Zn = 667 ppm – 0.19%. The government is cautious about the exploiting methods as most of its current economical pillars are largely based on the sensitive environmental balance that has to be preserved properly.

==== Geothermal Energy Resources ====
The Geological Institut of Bandung has conducted a survey that confirmed a geothermal energy reservoir of 2000 m depth on an area of 20 km^{2}. The recovery factor is at 50%, the conversion factor at 10% and the overall lifetime is estimated to be 30 years. The resources provide opportunity to generate approximately 325 MW of electrical power. The near-surface temperature is around 250 ̊C whereas the cut-off temperature is 180 ̊C. Projects are currently prepared and Indonesian and international partners are invited to participate.
