= 2023–24 Liga 3 Bengkulu =

Tournament details
- Country: Indonesia
- Venue: 1
- Dates: 23 February – 10 March 2024
- Teams: 11

Final positions
- Champions: Tri Brata Rafflesia (1st title)
- Runners-up: Bengkulu Putra
- Qualified for: 2023–24 Liga 3 National phase

Tournament statistics
- Matches played: 28
- Goals scored: 120 (4.29 per match)
- All statistics correct as of 10 March 2024.

2023–24 Liga 3 Bengkulu is the sixth edition of Liga 3 Bengkulu organized by Asprov PSSI Bengkulu.

This competition was attended by 11 clubs. The winner of this competition will advance to the national phase.

Benteng HB is the defending champion after winning it in the 2021 season.

== Teams ==
A total of 11 teams are competing in this season.

No.	Team	Location
1	Avrilia Hafiz	Bengkulu City
2	Bengkulu Putra	Bengkulu City
3	Bengkulu Soccer Community	Bengkulu City
4	Persipa Bengkulu	Bengkulu City
5	Tri Brata Rafflesia	Bengkulu City
6	Tunas Muda	Bengkulu City
7	Benteng HB	Central Bengkulu Regency
8	Renal	Central Bengkulu Regency
9	Gurita Kaur	Kaur Regency
10	PS Kaur	Kaur Regency
11	Mutu	Seluma Regency

== Venue ==
- Semarak Stadium, Bengkulu City

== Group stage ==
=== Group A ===
Pos	Team	Pld	W	D	L	GF	GA	GD	Pts	Qualification
1	Bengkulu Putra	5	4	1	0	15	1	+14	13	Advance to the Knockout stage
2	Avrilia Hafiz	5	3	2	0	10	5	+5	11	Advance to the Knockout stage
3	Bengkulu Soccer Community	5	3	1	1	24	4	+20	10	
4	PS Kaur	5	2	0	3	7	13	−6	6	
5	Mutu	5	1	0	4	6	21	−15	3	
6	Renal	5	0	0	5	3	21	−18	0	

Source: Asprov PSSI Bengkulu
23 February 2024
14:00 WIB

Avrilia Hafiz	3–0 (w.o.)	Mutu
	Report

Semarak Stadium, Bengkulu City

Avrilia Hafiz were awarded a 3–0 win over Mutu.

23 February 2024
16:00 WIB

Renal	0–9	Bengkulu Soccer Community
	Report

Semarak Stadium, Bengkulu City
24 February 2024
14:00 WIB

PS Kaur	0–2	Bengkulu Putra
	Report

Semarak Stadium, Bengkulu City

25 February 2024
16:00 WIB

Avrilia Hafiz	3–2	Renal
	Report

Semarak Stadium, Bengkulu City
26 February 2024
14:00 WIB

PS Kaur	0–6	Bengkulu Soccer Community
	Report

Semarak Stadium, Bengkulu City
26 February 2024
16:00 WIB

Bengkulu Putra	6–0	Mutu
	Report

Semarak Stadium, Bengkulu City

28 February 2024
14:00 WIB

Avrilia Hafiz	2–2	Bengkulu Soccer Community
	Report

Semarak Stadium, Bengkulu City
28 February 2024
16:00 WIB

Mutu	3–0	Renal
	Report

Semarak Stadium, Bengkulu City

1 March 2024
14:00 WIB

Bengkulu Putra	1–1	Avrilia Hafiz
	Report

Semarak Stadium, Bengkulu City
1 March 2024
16:00 WIB

PS Kaur	5–3	Mutu
	Report

Semarak Stadium, Bengkulu City

3 March 2024
14:00 WIB

Renal	1–2	PS Kaur
	Report

Semarak Stadium, Bengkulu City
3 March 2024
16:00 WIB

Bengkulu Soccer Community	0–2	Bengkulu Putra
	Report

Semarak Stadium, Bengkulu City

5 March 2024
14:00 WIB

Renal	0–4	Bengkulu Putra
	Report

Semarak Stadium, Bengkulu City
5 March 2024
16:00 WIB

Bengkulu Soccer Community	7–0	Mutu
	Report

Semarak Stadium, Bengkulu City
6 March 2024
16:00 WIB

Avrilia Hafiz	1–0	PS Kaur
	Report

Semarak Stadium, Bengkulu City

=== Group B ===
Pos	Team	Pld	W	D	L	GF	GA	GD	Pts	Qualification
1	Tri Brata Rafflesia	4	4	0	0	27	1	+26	12	Advance to the Knockout stage
2	Tunas Muda	4	2	0	2	6	15	−9	6 (Note: Head-to-head result: Tunas Muda 1–0 Benteng HB.)	Advance to the Knockout stage
3	Benteng HB	4	2	0	2	3	6	−3	6	
4	Persipa Bengkulu	4	1	1	2	3	6	−3	4	
5	Gurita Kaur	4	0	1	3	1	12	−11	1	

Source: Asprov PSSI Bengkulu
Notes:
24 February 2024
16:00 WIB

Tri Brata Rafflesia	4–0	Benteng HB
	Report

Semarak Stadium, Bengkulu City
25 February 2024
14:00 WIB

Gurita Kaur	0–0	Persipa Bengkulu
	Report

Semarak Stadium, Bengkulu City

27 February 2024
14:00 WIB

Tunas Muda	1–0	Benteng HB
	Report

Semarak Stadium, Bengkulu City
27 February 2024
16:00 WIB

Persipa Bengkulu	0–4	Tri Brata Rafflesia
	Report

Semarak Stadium, Bengkulu City

29 February 2024
14:00 WIB

Tri Brata Rafflesia	13–0	Tunas Muda
	Report

Semarak Stadium, Bengkulu City
29 February 2024
16:00 WIB

Benteng HB	1–0	Gurita Kaur
	Report

Semarak Stadium, Bengkulu City

2 March 2024
14:00 WIB

Benteng HB	2–1	Persipa Bengkulu
	Report

Semarak Stadium, Bengkulu City
2 March 2024
16:00 WIB

Gurita Kaur	1–6	Tri Brata Rafflesia
	Report

Semarak Stadium, Bengkulu City

4 March 2024
16:00 WIB

Persipa Bengkulu	2–0	Tunas Muda
	Report

Semarak Stadium, Bengkulu City

6 March 2024
14:00 WIB

Tunas Muda	5–0	Gurita Kaur
	Report

Semarak Stadium, Bengkulu City

== Knockout stage ==
=== Bracket ===
Semi-finals
8 March – Bengkulu City
A1	Bengkulu Putra (p)	1 (5)
B2	Tunas Muda	1 (4)
8 March – Bengkulu City
B1	Tri Brata Rafflesia	5
A2	Avrilia Hafiz	0

Final
10 March – Bengkulu City
Bengkulu Putra	2
Tri Brata Rafflesia	6

=== Semi-finals ===
8 March 2024
14:00 WIB

Bengkulu Putra	1–1 (a.e.t.)	Tunas Muda
	Report
Penalties
	5–4

Semarak Stadium, Bengkulu City

8 March 2024
16:00 WIB

Tri Brata Rafflesia	5–0	Avrilia Hafiz
	Report

Semarak Stadium, Bengkulu City

=== Final ===
10 March 2024
14:00 WIB

Bengkulu Putra	2–6	Tri Brata Rafflesia
	Report

Semarak Stadium, Bengkulu City

== Qualification to the national phase ==
Team	Method of qualification	Date of qualification	Qualified to
Tri Brata Rafflesia	Champions of 2023–24 Liga 3 Bengkulu	10 March 2024	2023–24 Liga 3 National Phase

== See also ==
- 2023–24 Liga 3 National Phase
