= 2022 Liga 3 Bengkulu =

Tournament details
- Country: Indonesia
- Dates: TBD 2022
- Teams: 19
- Qualified for: 2022 Liga 3 National Round

The 2022 Liga 3 Bengkulu is the fifth edition of Liga 3 Bengkulu organized by Asprov PSSI Bengkulu.

Followed by 19 clubs. The winner of this competition will immediately advance to the national round.

Benteng HB is the defending champion after winning it in the 2021 season.

== Teams ==
No	Team	Location
01	Persiman	South Bengkulu Regency
02	Benteng HB	Central Bengkulu Regency
03	Renal	Central Bengkulu Regency
04	Persibutara	North Bengkulu Regency
05	Utara United	North Bengkulu Regency
06	Gurita Kaur	Kaur Regency
07	PS Kepahiang	Kepahiang Regency
08	PS Mukomuko	Mukomuko Regency
09	Persirel	Rejang Lebong Regency
10	Religius	Rejang Lebong Regency
11	Mutu	Seluma Regency
12	Persipa Bengkulu	Bengkulu
13	Bengkulu Soccer Community	Bengkulu
14	Tri Brata Rafflesia	Bengkulu
15	Bengkulu Raya	Bengkulu
16	Bengkulu Putra	Bengkulu
17	Avrilia Hafiz	Bengkulu
18	PS Bengkulu	Bengkulu
19	Tunas Muda	Bengkulu

== Venues ==
- Semarak Sawah Lebar Stadium, Bengkulu

== First round ==
=== Group A ===
Pos	Team	Pld	W	D	L	GF	GA	GD	Pts	Qualification	PPA	RNL	PRL	BHB	BUT
1	Persipa Bengkulu	0	0	0	0	0	0	0	0	Advance to Second round	—				
2	Renal	0	0	0	0	0	0	0	0	Advance to Second round		—			
3	Persirel Rejang Lebong	0	0	0	0	0	0	0	0				—		
4	Benteng HB	0	0	0	0	0	0	0	0					—	
5	Persibutara	0	0	0	0	0	0	0	0						—

Updated to match(es) played on unknown. Source: Liga 3 2022 Bengkulu

=== Group B ===
Pos	Team	Pld	W	D	L	GF	GA	GD	Pts	Qualification	KAU	BSC	RLG	TBR	UTR
1	Gurita Kaur	0	0	0	0	0	0	0	0	Advance to Second round	—				
2	Bengkulu Soccer Community	0	0	0	0	0	0	0	0	Advance to Second round		—			
3	Religius	0	0	0	0	0	0	0	0				—		
4	Tri Brata Rafflesia	0	0	0	0	0	0	0	0					—	
5	Utara United	0	0	0	0	0	0	0	0						—

Updated to match(es) played on unknown. Source: Liga 3 2022 Bengkulu

=== Group C ===
Pos	Team	Pld	W	D	L	GF	GA	GD	Pts	Qualification	PMN	BRA	BPT	MUT	AVR
1	Persiman Manna	0	0	0	0	0	0	0	0	Advance to Second round	—				
2	Bengkulu Raya	0	0	0	0	0	0	0	0	Advance to Second round		—			
3	Bengkulu Putra	0	0	0	0	0	0	0	0				—		
4	Mutu	0	0	0	0	0	0	0	0					—	
5	Avrilia Hafiz	0	0	0	0	0	0	0	0						—

Updated to match(es) played on unknown. Source: Liga 3 2022 Bengkulu

=== Group D ===
Pos	Team	Pld	W	D	L	GF	GA	GD	Pts	Qualification	PSB	TUN	PSK	MUK
1	PS Bengkulu	0	0	0	0	0	0	0	0	Advance to Second round	—			
2	Tunas Muda	0	0	0	0	0	0	0	0	Advance to Second round		—		
3	PS Kepahiang	0	0	0	0	0	0	0	0				—	
4	PS Mukomuko	0	0	0	0	0	0	0	0					—

Updated to match(es) played on unknown. Source: Liga 3 2022 Bengkulu

== Second round ==
Wait for the first round to finish.
