= Persipa Bengkulu =

Indonesian football club

- Full name: Persatuan Sepakbola Indonesia Pagardewa Bengkulu
- Nicknames: Singa Dewa (The Deity Lions)
- Ground: Semarak Stadium; Bengkulu
- Capacity: 15,000
- Owner: Askot PSSI Bengkulu
- Manager: Atisar Sulaiman
- Coach: Syawaluddin
- League: Liga 4
- 2024–25: 4th, (Bengkulu zone)
Home colours	Away colours

Persatuan Sepakbola Indonesia Pagardewa Bengkulu (simply known as Persipa Bengkulu) is an Indonesian football club based in Selebar, Bengkulu (city), Bengkulu. They currently compete in the Liga 4.

== Honours ==
- Liga 3 Bengkulu
  - Champion (1): 2019
