= Selebar =

- District
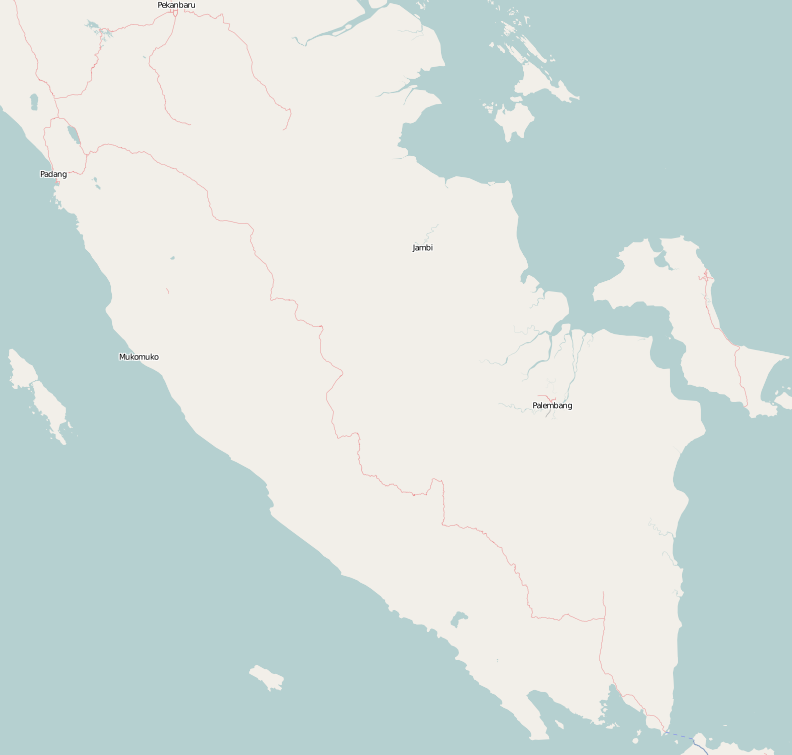
- Location in Southern Sumatra Location in Indonesia
- Coordinates: 3°54′17″S 102°19′13″E
- Country: Indonesia
- Region: Sumatra
- Province: Bengkulu
- City: Bengkulu
- Time zone: UTC+7 (IWST)

Selebar is a small port town on the south-west coast of Sumatra, Indonesia. It is located several kilometres south of Bengkulu City and is noted for its large harbor. Administratively, Selebar forms a districts of Bengkulu province.
