= Kebun Gerand =

Kebun Gerand (Kebun Gerand)
- Administrative Area
- Location within Indonesia
- Coordinates: 3°47′42.8″S 102°14′42.4″E
- Country: Indonesia
- Province: Bengkulu
- Regency: Bengkulu
- District: Ratu Samban

Population (2010)
  - Total: 2,239
- Time zone: UTC+8 (WITA)

Kebun Gerand is an Administrative Area in the Bengkulu Province, Indonesia. This village has a population of 2239 according to the 2010 census.
