= Thomas Parr Monument =

Coordinates: 3°47′19.47″S 102°15′2.53″E

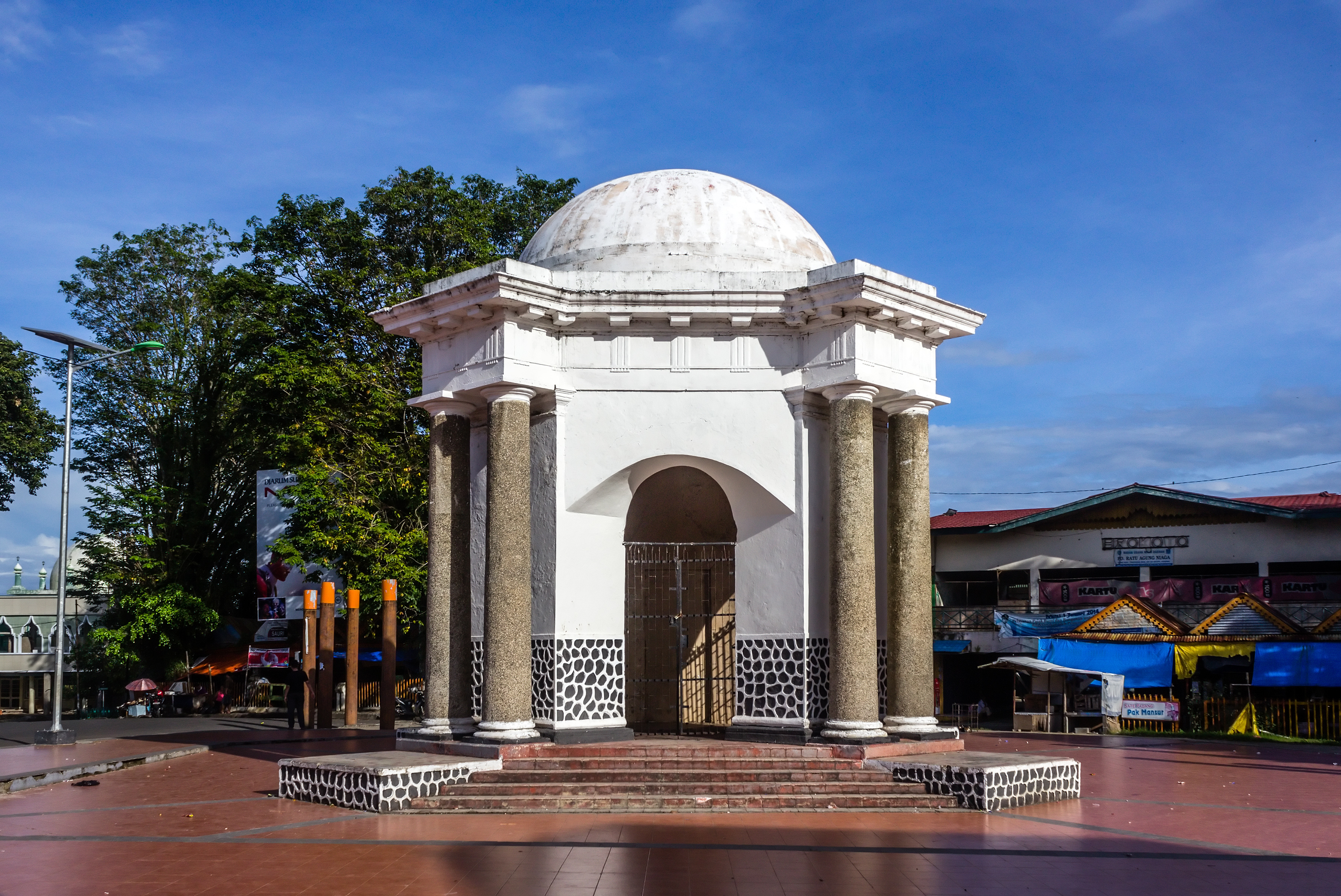
The monument

The Thomas Parr Monument (Indonesian: Tugu Thomas Parr) is a monument located in Bengkulu, Bengkulu, Indonesia and dedicated to Thomas Parr, the British Resident of Bengkulu who was killed in 1807. Constructed the year after his death, it is considered a cultural property of Indonesia.

== Location ==
The Thomas Parr Monument is located along Ahmad Yani Street, in the Kampung Cina (Chinatown) subdistrict of Bengkulu City, Bengkulu. It is not far from the city center, and easily accessed.

The monument is located approximately 170 metres (560 ft) southeast of Fort Marlborough, the former British stronghold in the region. This location was originally near the buildings housing the British East India Company government and ruling council. However, since then the area has become predominantly commercial, with several shops and a post office located near the monument.

== Description ==
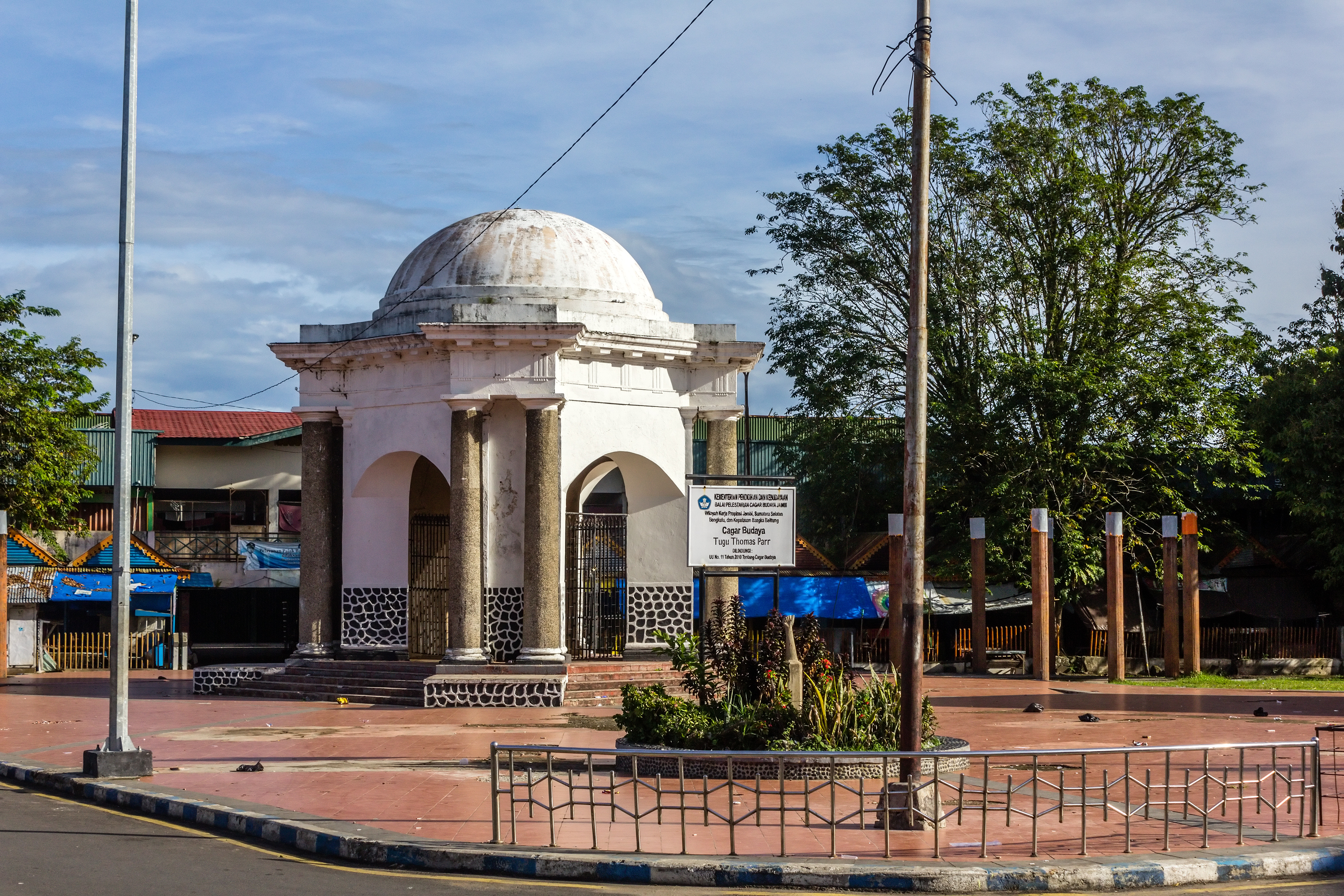
The monument, in its small park

The Thomas Parr Monument is octagonal in shape, covering a total area of 70 square metres (750 sq ft). Three arched openings provide entrance, and six Tuscan or Roman Doric columns surround the monument. The 13.5-metre (44 ft) monument is topped with a dome. Owing to this dome, the mausoleum is also known locally as "Kuburan Bulek" ('Round Grave').

A wooden plaque lies within the monument, though as of 2014 it is illegible. Alan Harfield, in his 1985 discussion of the British graveyard and monuments in Bengkulu, quotes it as follows:

Here are deposited the Remains of Thomas Parr Esquire, Resident and Representative of the Honourable E.I. Cy. at Fort Marlborough in Bencoolen who although a benevolent Father to the Malay Inhabitants and solicitous to improve their Freedom and Prosperity in the prudent and gradual Introduction of Spontaneous ................................ fell with(out sent)ence of the ... and (unr)ivalled atrocity under the misguided and barbarous Fury of a Band of Assassins in the Night of the 27th of December A.D. 1807 in the ...th Year of His Age.

Around the monument is a small park, with trees and other plants. The park is, in turn, surrounded by an iron fence.

== History ==
Bengkulu (then known as Bencoolen) fell under control of the Honourable East India Company during the 17th century. The company constructed a fortress, Fort Marlborough, and began to govern the region. In 1805, Thomas Parr was appointed Resident of Bencoolen, and introduced the large-scale production of coffee into the region. The monument described Parr as "a benevolent Father" to the Malay residents of Bengkulu, while Indonesian sources describe him as an "arrogant and ferocious man" who constantly interfered with the traditional customs of the Bengkulu populace. During a rebellion against his administration on 27 September 1807, Parr and his aide Charles Murray were killed; three men entered his home, Mount Felix, stabbing and decapitating Parr and inflicting fatal wounds upon Murray. The East India Company quashed the rebellion, and the following year, a monument was constructed to honor Parr.

Though the monument was built as a memorial to Parr and his death, the people of Bengkulu have reinterpreted it as a testament to their willingness to defend their land rights and traditional customs. The monument is a cultural property of Indonesia.

== Works cited ==
- Erza, Dwi. "Monumen Thomas Parr" [Thomas Parr Monument] (in Indonesian). Bengkulu Provincial Government. Archived from the original on 11 April 2015.
- Harfield, Alan (1985). Bencoolen: The Christian Cemetery and the Fort Marlborough Monuments. London: British Association for Cemeteries in South Asia. ISBN 978-0-907799-10-8.
- "Tugu Thomas Parr" [Thomas Parr Monument] (in Indonesian). Center for the Preservation of Cultural Properties, Jambi. 24 January 2014. Archived from the original on 18 May 2015.
- "Tugu Thomas Parr" [Thomas Parr Monument] (in Indonesian). Bengkulu Municipal Government. Archived from the original on 4 March 2016.
- "Tugu Thomas Parr, Monumen Rakyat Bengkulu Menolak Ditindas" [Thomas Parr Monument, a Monument to the People of Bengkulu who Refused to be Subjugated]. Kupas Bengkulu (in Indonesian). 18 May 2014. Archived from the original on 18 May 2015.
