= Fort Marlborough =

Fort in Bengkulu, Indonesia

Coordinates: 3.787093°S 102.251848°E

- Fort Marlborough
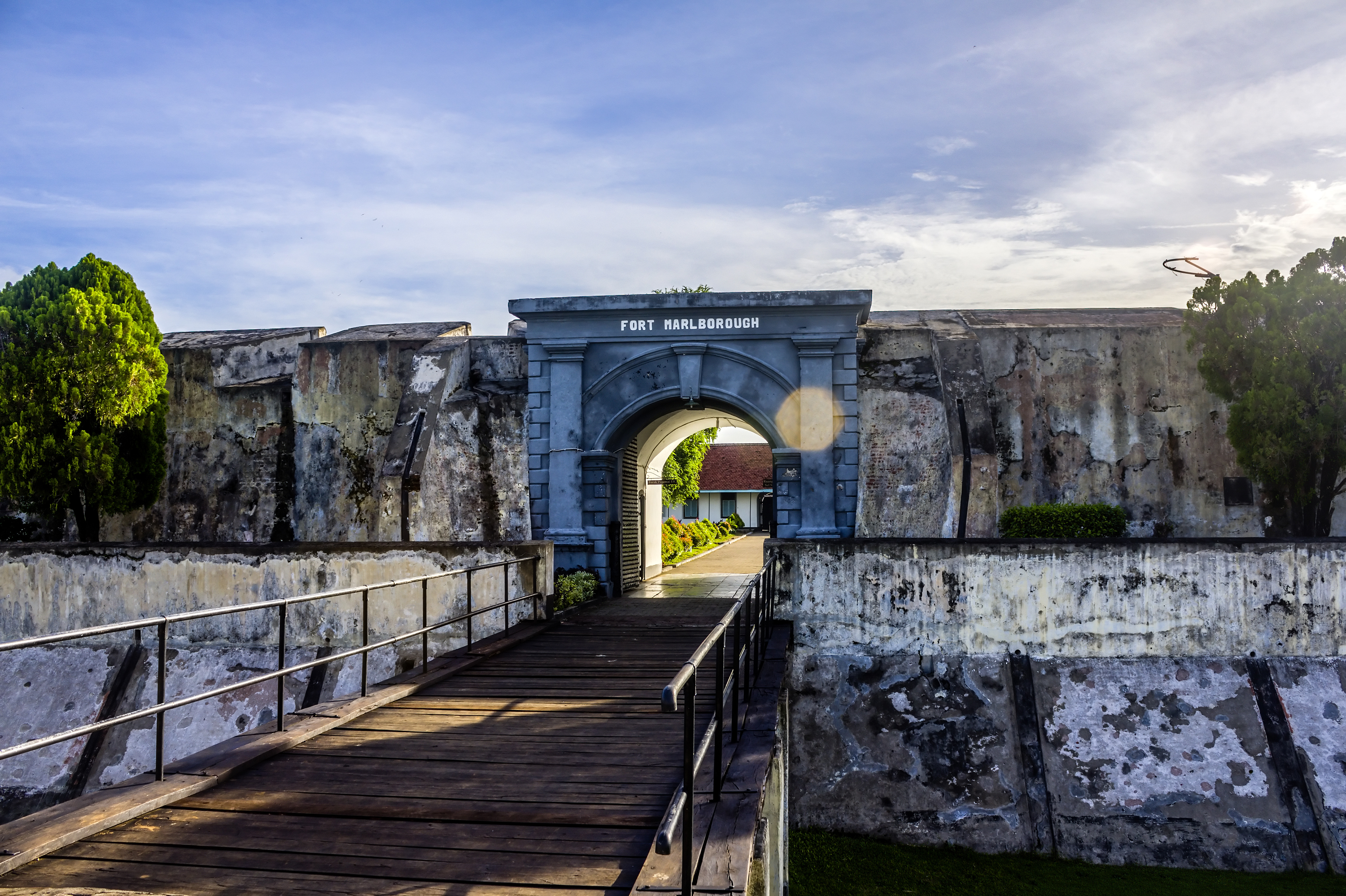
- Front gate of Fort Marlborough, Bengkulu, Indonesia

- Location within Sumatra
- Location: Bengkulu City, Bengkulu Province, Indonesia
- Nearest city: Bengkulu City
- Area: 0.027 km^{2} (0.010 sq mi)
- Established: 1713 (build) – 1719 (finish)
- Governing body: Ministry of Tourism
- Website: www.indonesia-tourism.com/bengkulu/fort_marlborough.html

Fort Marlborough (Indonesian: Benteng Marlborough, also known as Malabero) is a former East India Company fort located in Bengkulu City, Sumatra. It was built between 1713 and 1719 by the East India Company under the leadership of Governor Joseph Collett as a defensive fort for the British East India Company's Residency there. It was one of the strongest British forts in the eastern region, second only to Fort St. George in Madras, India.

== Building ==
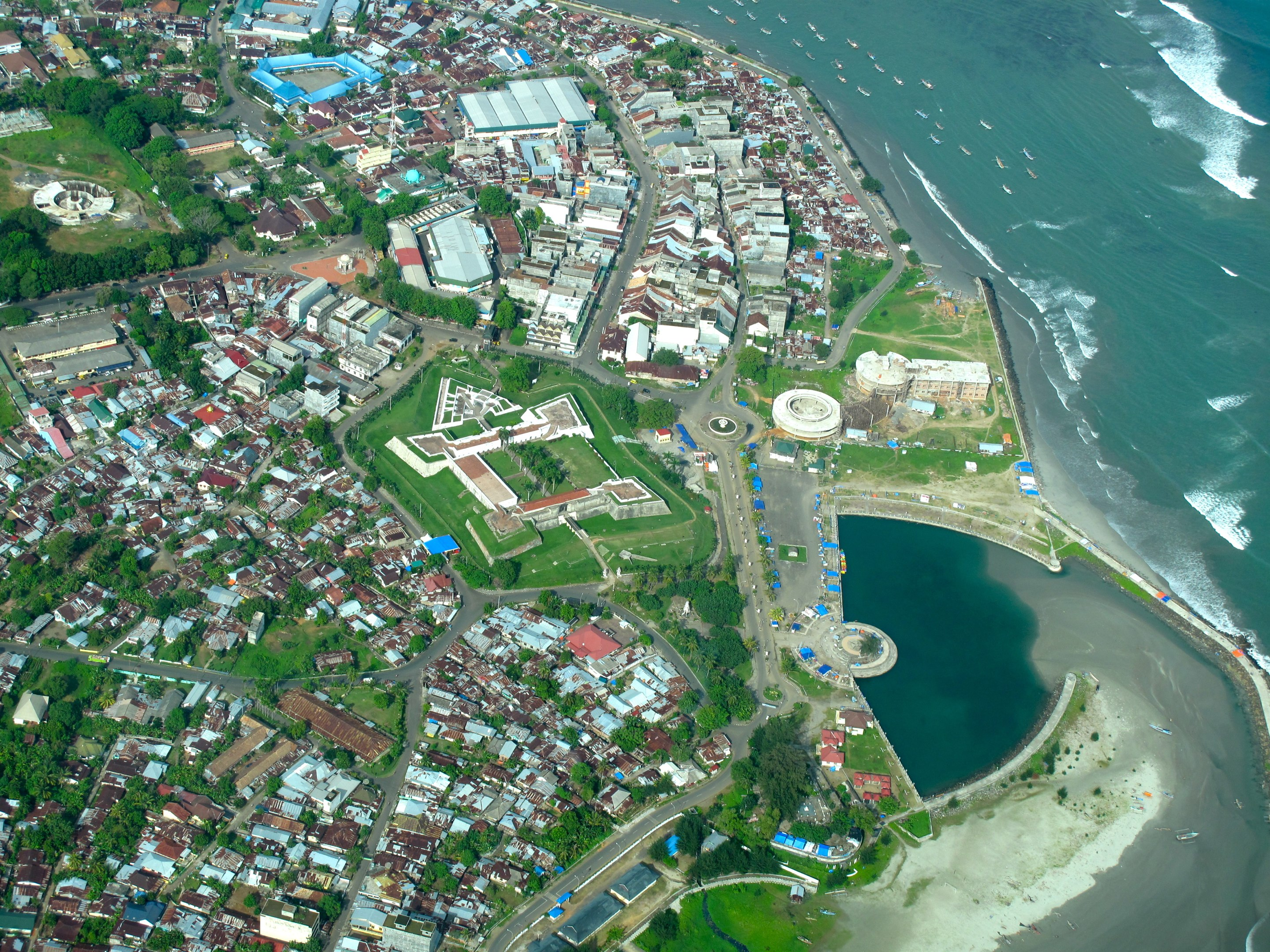
Bengkulu City with Fort Marlborough in center

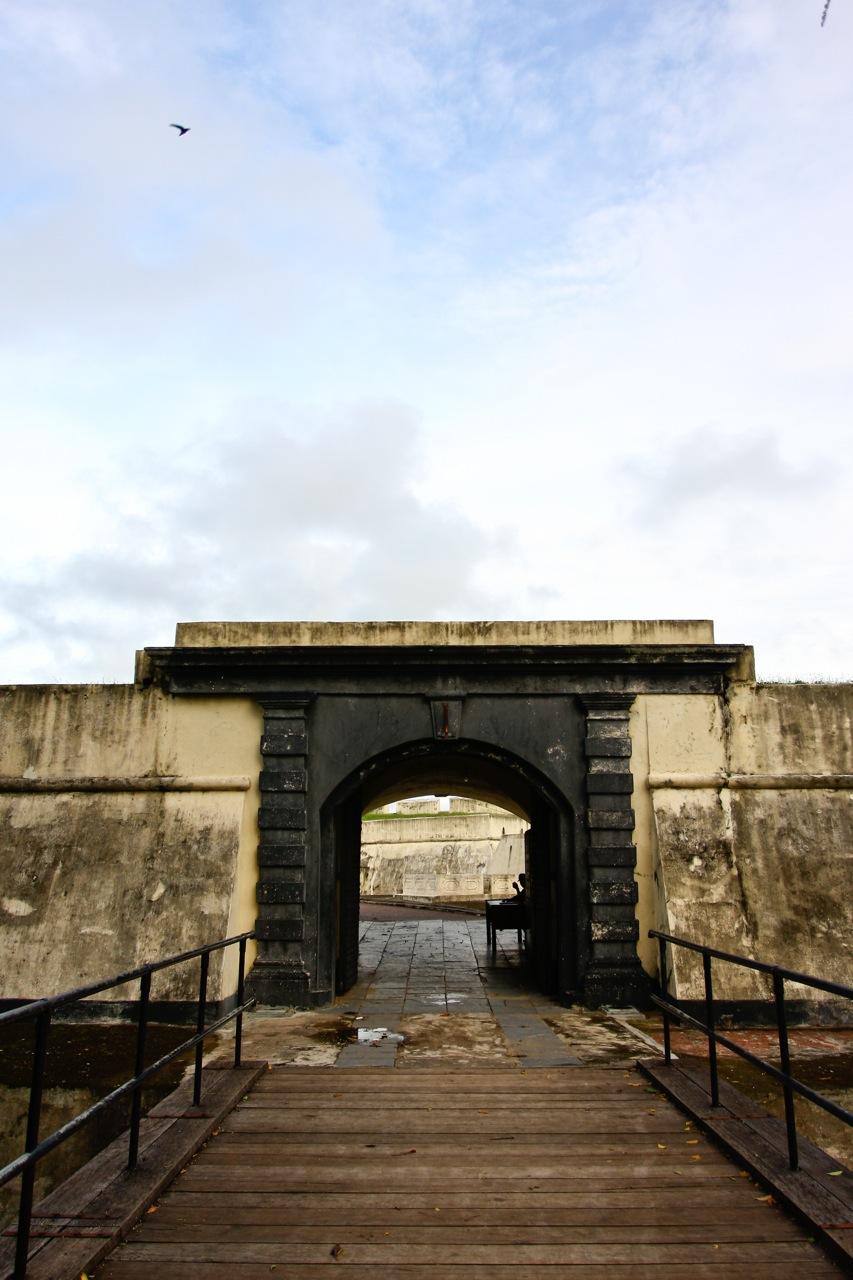
Southwest arch entrance of Fort Marlborough

The fort is made of bricks 50 to 180 centimeters in thickness. The 2000 Enggano earthquake, which registered 7.9 on the moment magnitude scale, and of 2007, with its 3.5-meter tsunami, had no effect on the strongly built fort.

The fort has a rectangular layout, with an arrowhead-shaped bastion on each corner. The entrance to the fort is in the southwest, protected by a ravelin. A dry moat follows the trace of the fort. A wooden bridge spans the ditch that separates the main building from the front building. The southwest side has an arch entrance with a wooden door. The fort encompasses 2.7 hectares, and stands on a site of 4.4 hectares.

== History ==
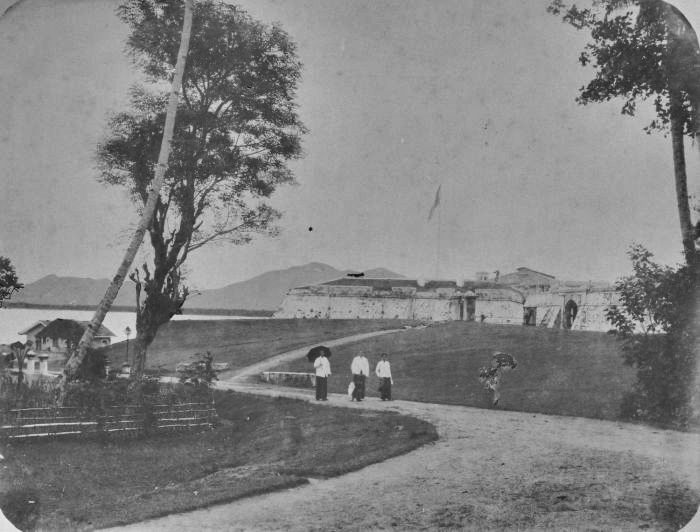
European women dressed in sarongs in front of Fort Marlborough (early 20th century)

The British East India Company built the fort between 1713 and 1719. In 1714, Governor Collett obtained permission to build a new fort in Bencoolen. He named the new fort, which he built two miles from an older fort (Fort York), Fort Marlborough.

The fort was built on an artificial hill, and construction, using both convict and local labor, took several years to complete. During that period, the civil officers and the military garrison were divided between the old and the new fort.

In April 1715, Governor Collett sent a copy of the plan of the first Fort Marlborough; the plan showed that the fort was walled with earth ramparts and ditch, with gun platforms on the bastions. The pace of construction was slow.

In 1760, during the Seven Years' War, a French squadron under the command of Charles Hector, Comte d'Estaing took the fort and used it as a base to attack and subdue other British settlements on the west coast of Sumatra. Before returning to the Mascarenes, he ransomed the fort back to the British.

At one time, the native people of Bengkulu burned the fort, forcing the inhabitants to flee to Madras. They returned in 1724 after an agreement was reached. In 1793, another attack on the fort occurred, killing one British officer, Robert Hamilton. Another attack happened in 1807, killing a resident, Thomas Parr. Both are commemorated with monuments in Bengkulu City erected by the British colonial government. The monument to Parr is 170 metres (560 ft) southeast of the fortress.

The British transferred Bengkulu, then known as Bencoolen, to Dutch control under the Anglo-Dutch Treaty of 1824, which defined British and Dutch spheres of influence. In exchange, the Dutch ceded Malacca to Britain and gave up their designs on the British settlement of Singapore. In 1837, the fort had about 60 Dutch soldiers occupying it. The Japanese occupied the fort during their occupation of the Dutch East Indies (1942–1945). Then, during the Indonesian National Revolution period, the fort housed the headquarters of the Indonesian national police until the Dutch reoccupied the fort. When the Dutch left Indonesia in 1950, the Indonesian Army took over the fort. In 1977, the fort was handed over to the then Department of Education and Culture to be restored and converted into a heritage site.

== Gallery ==
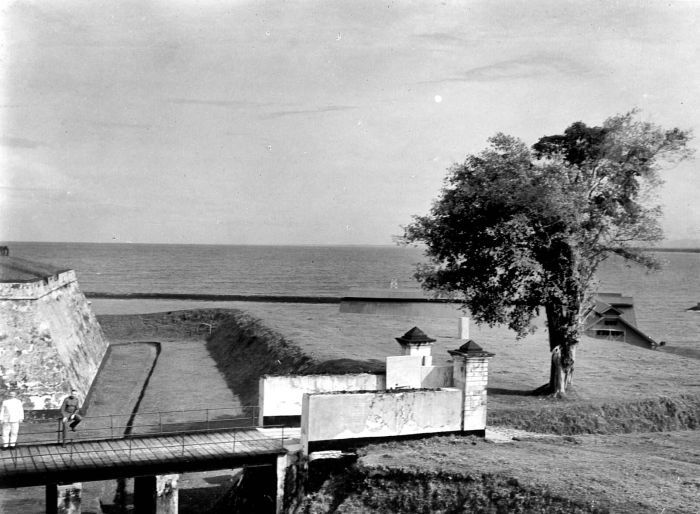

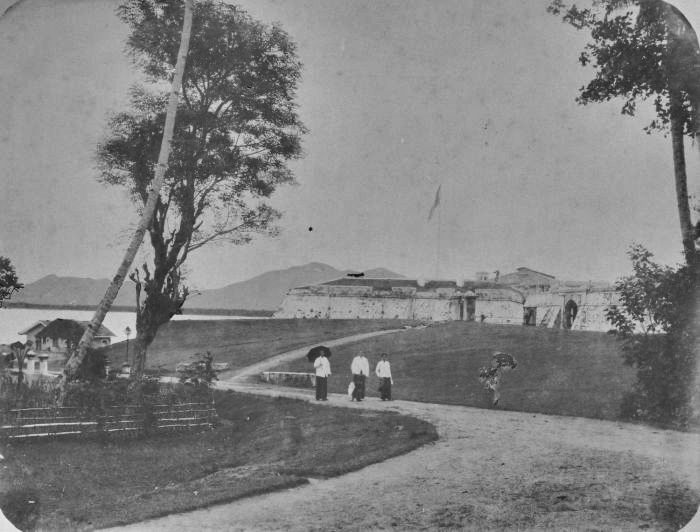

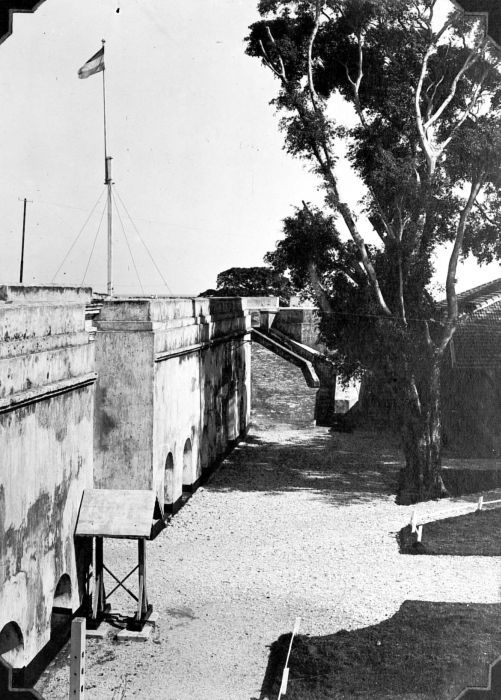

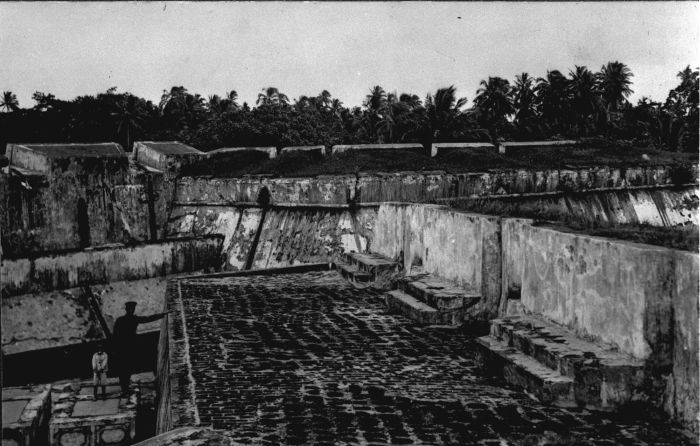

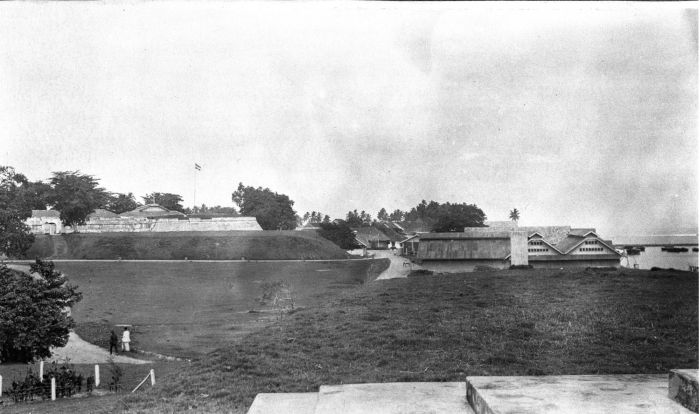

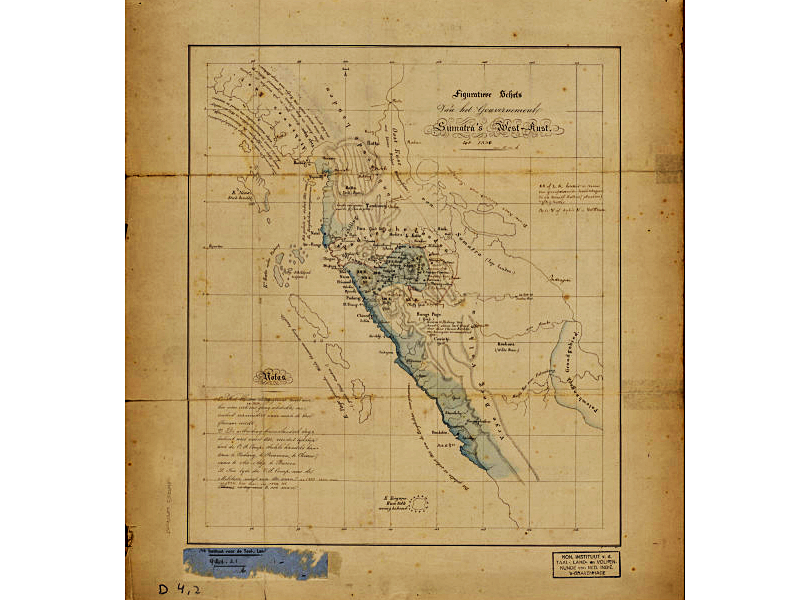

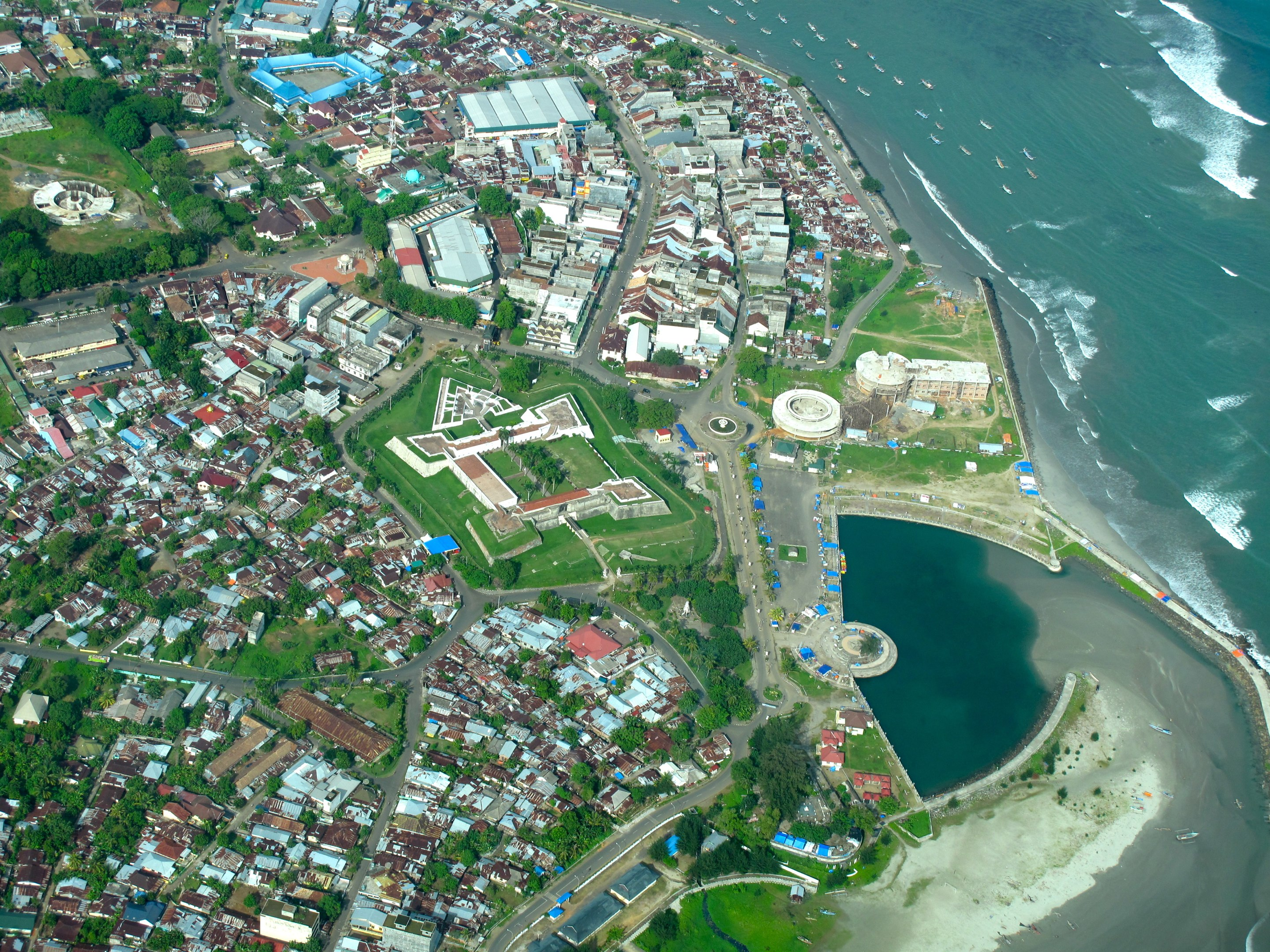

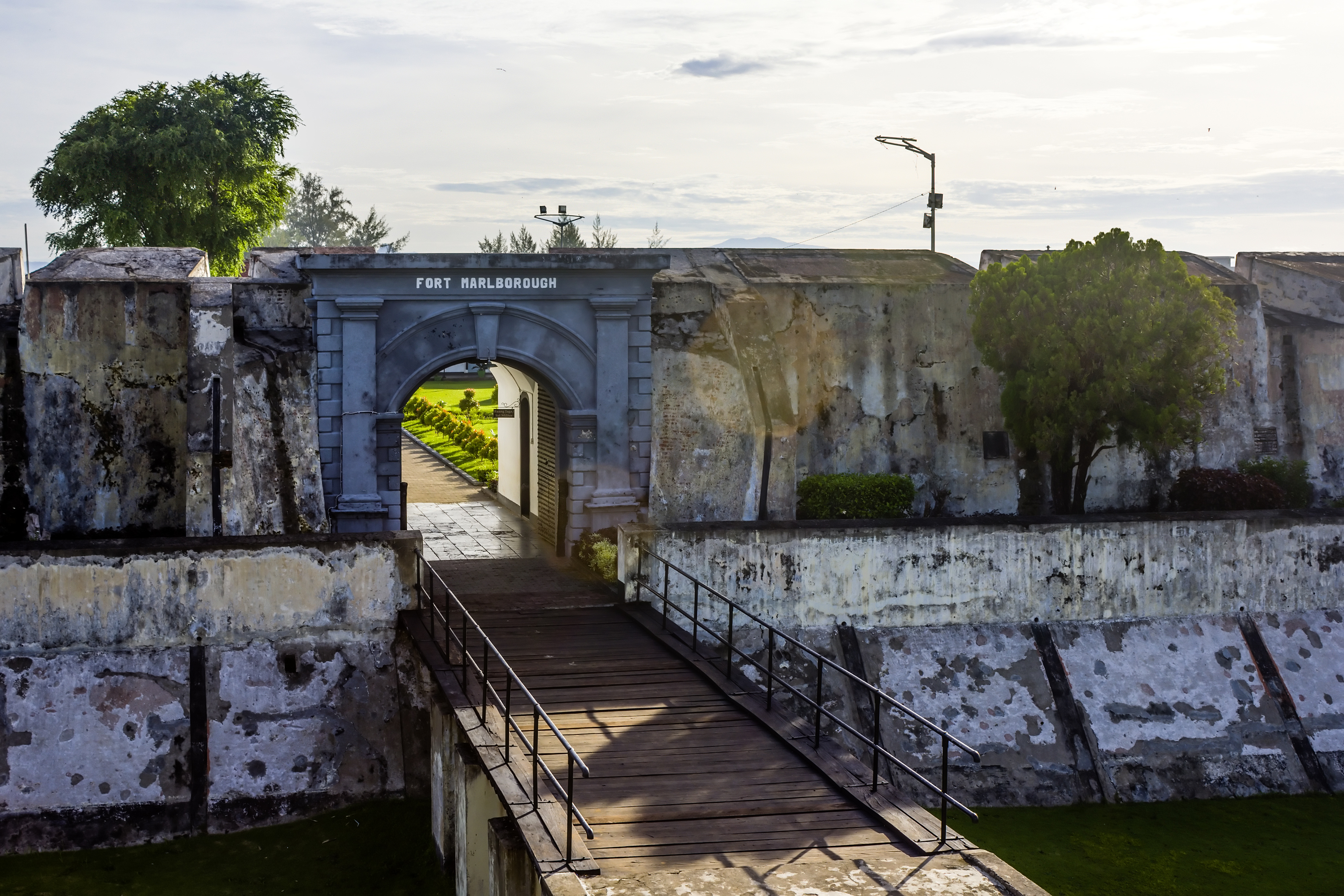

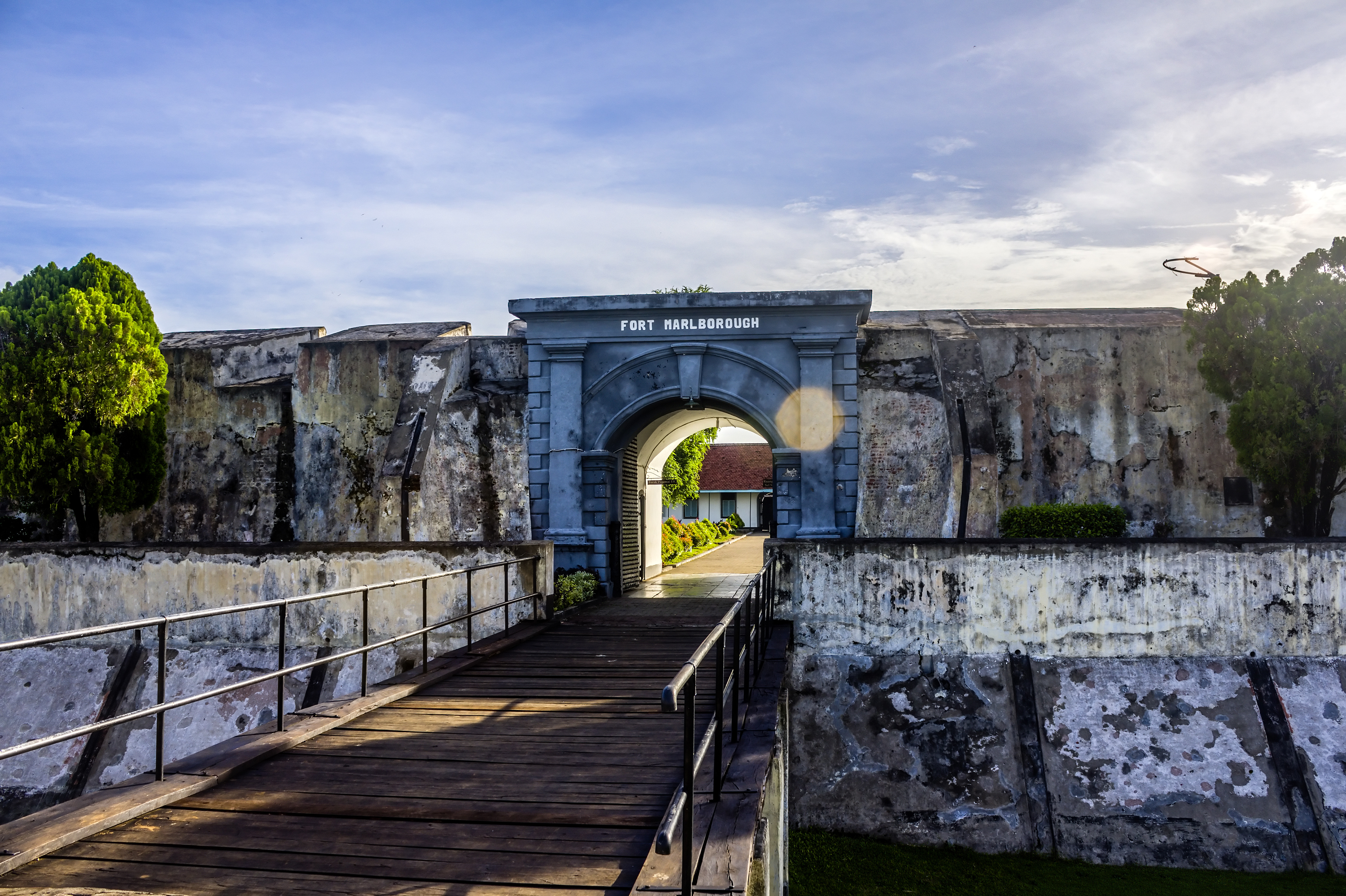

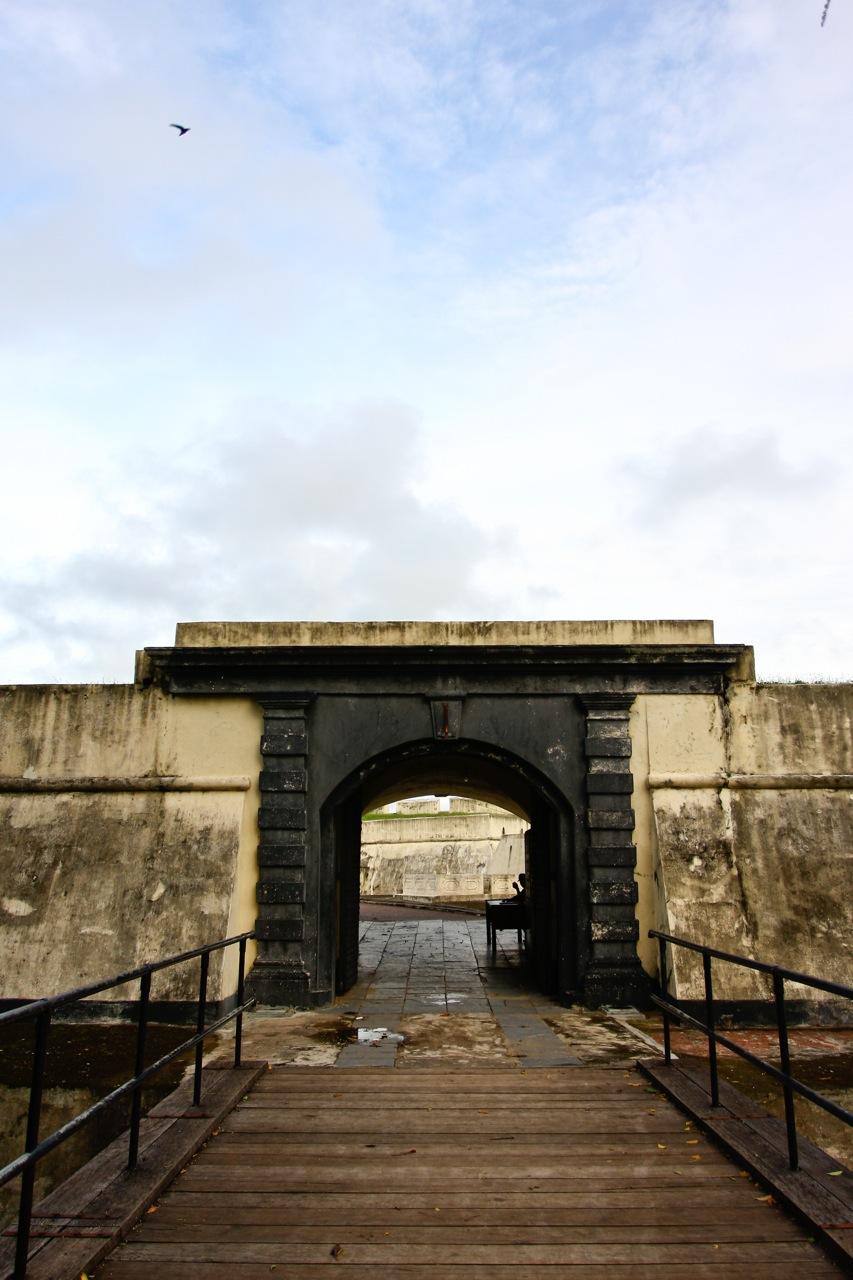

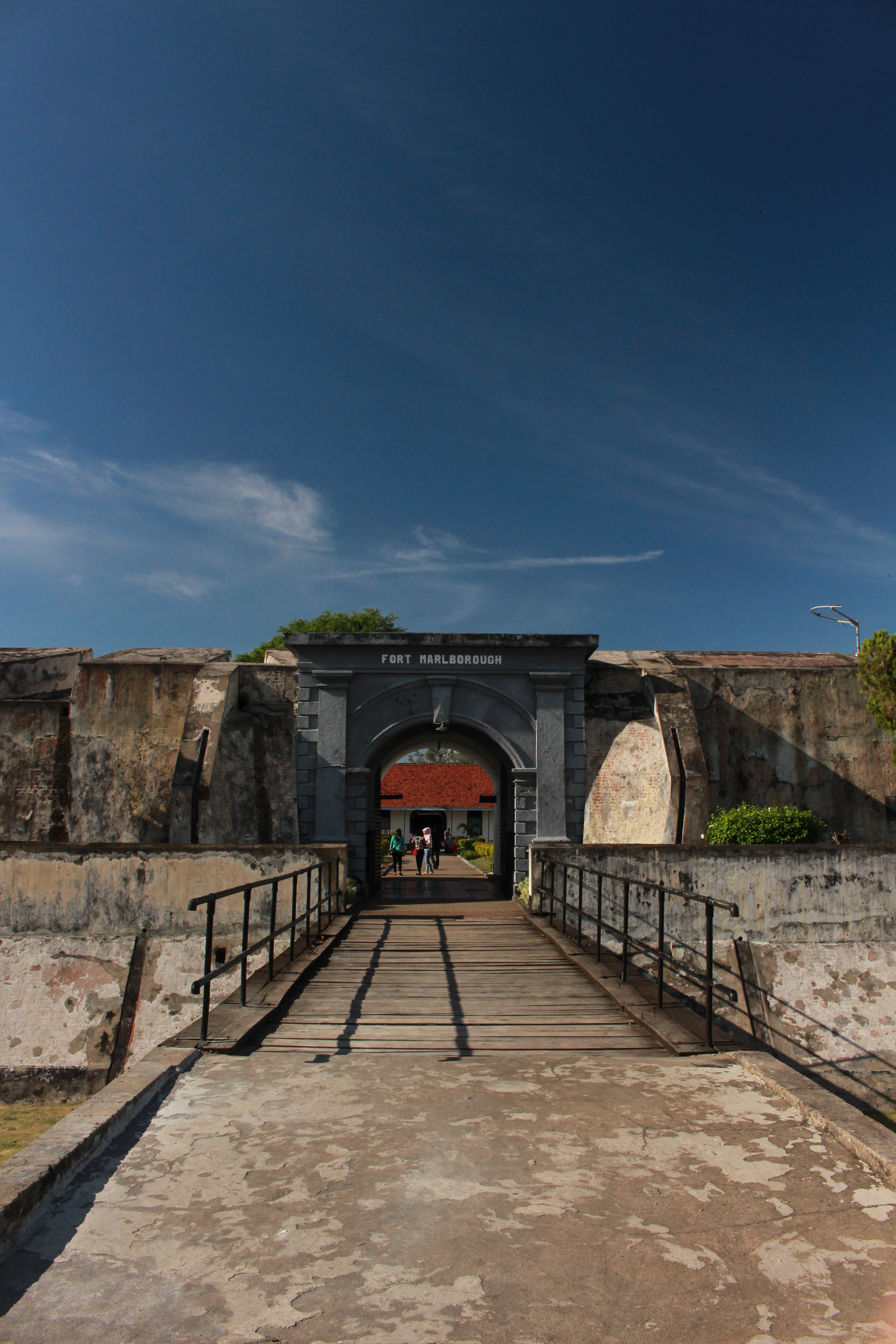

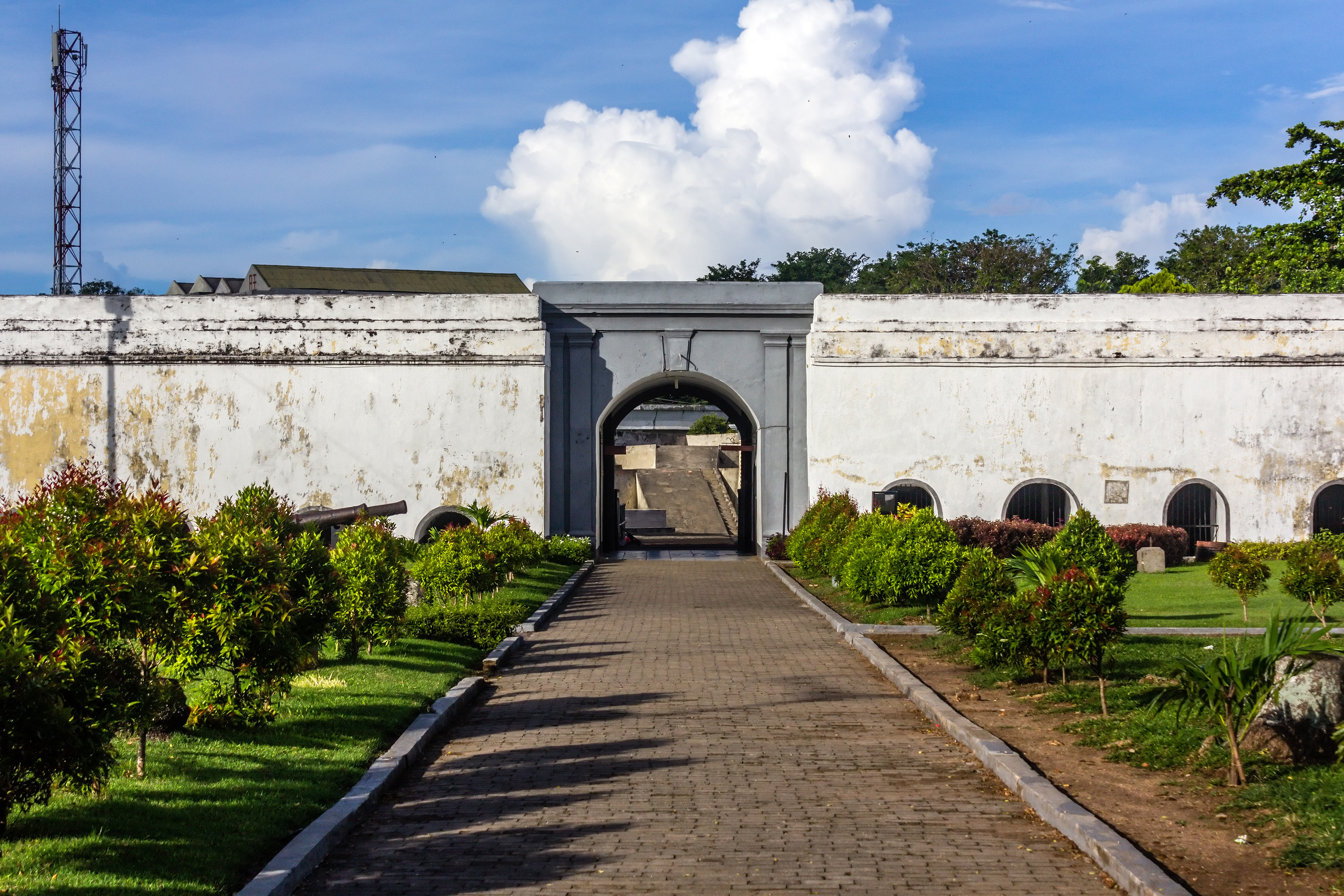

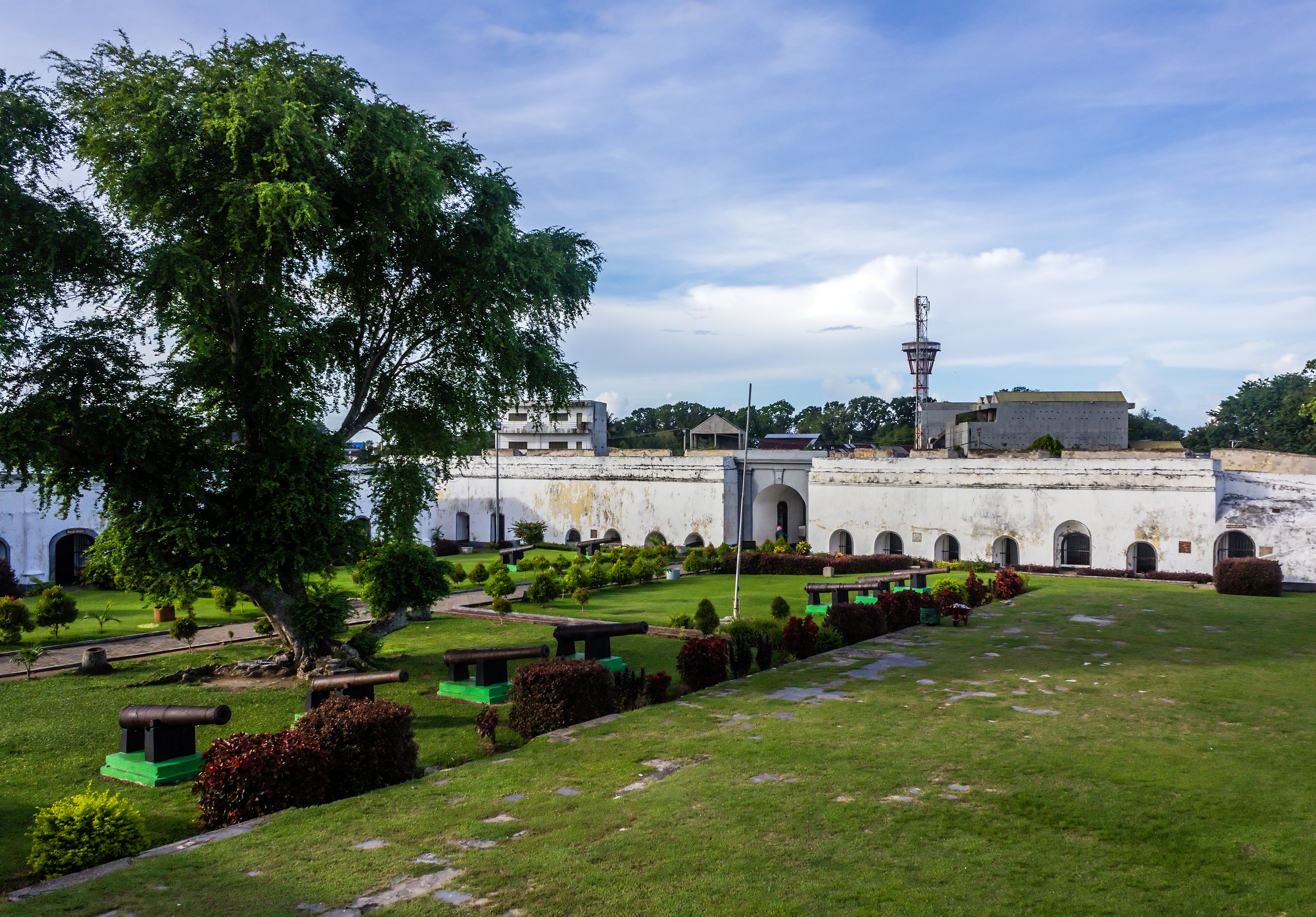

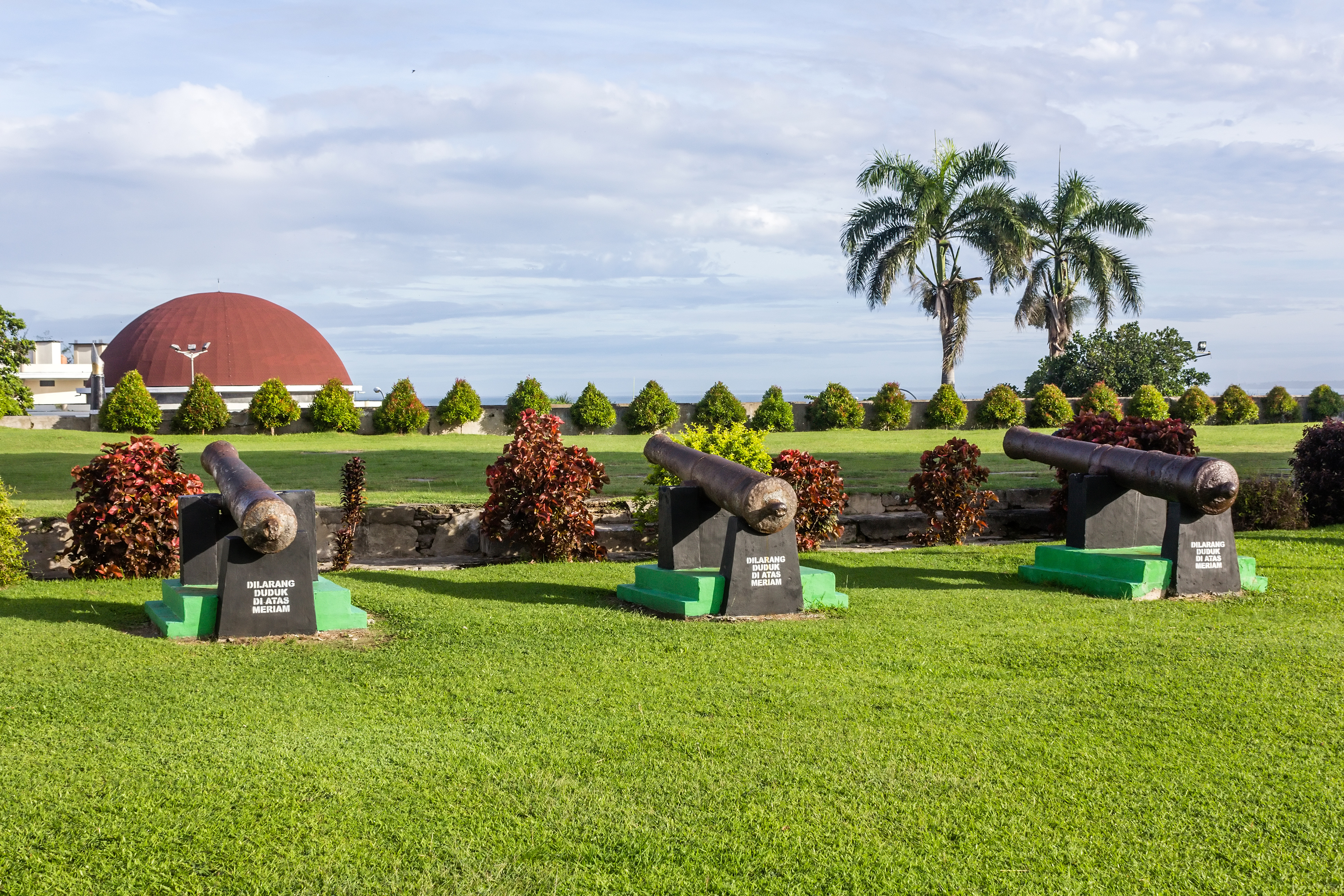

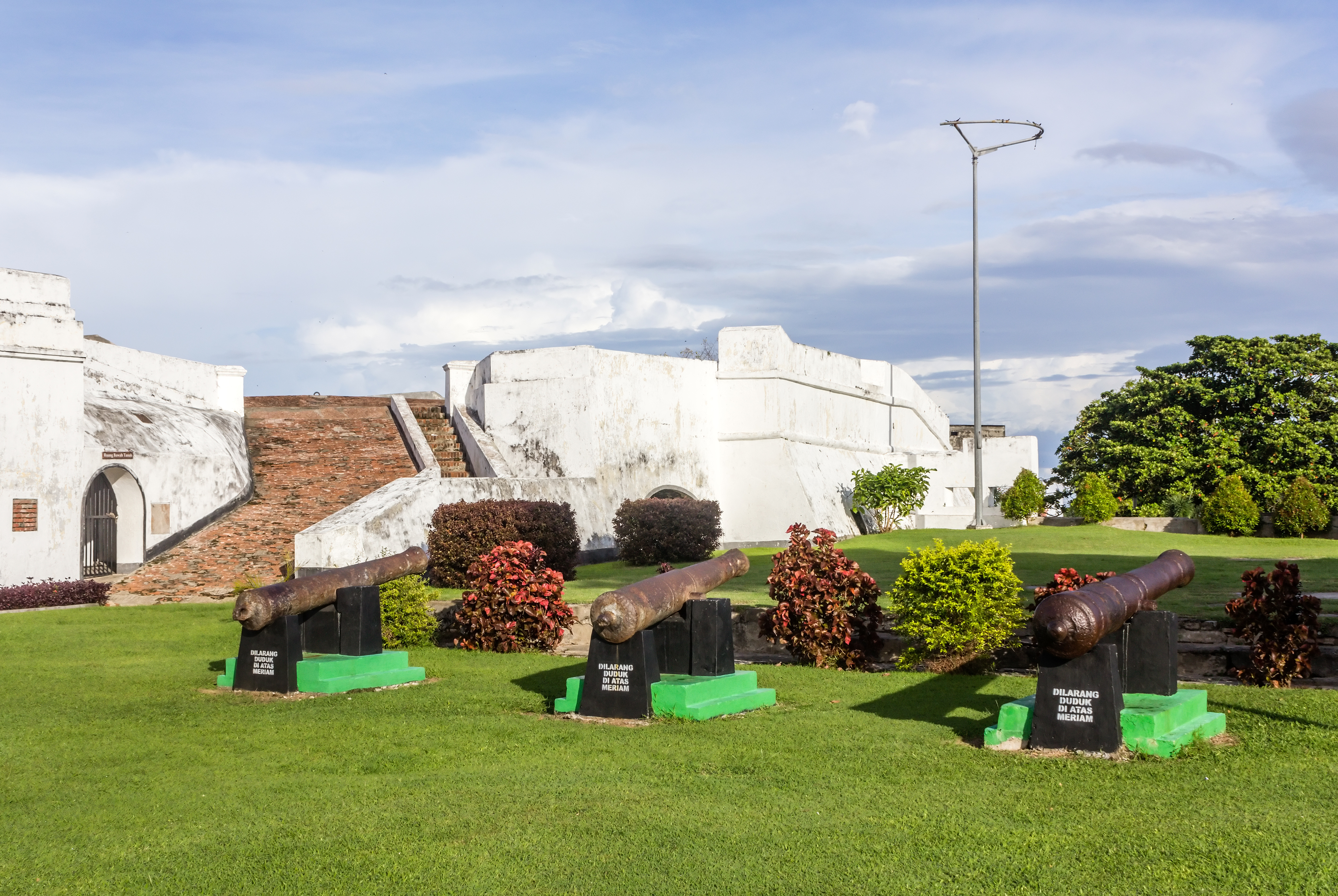

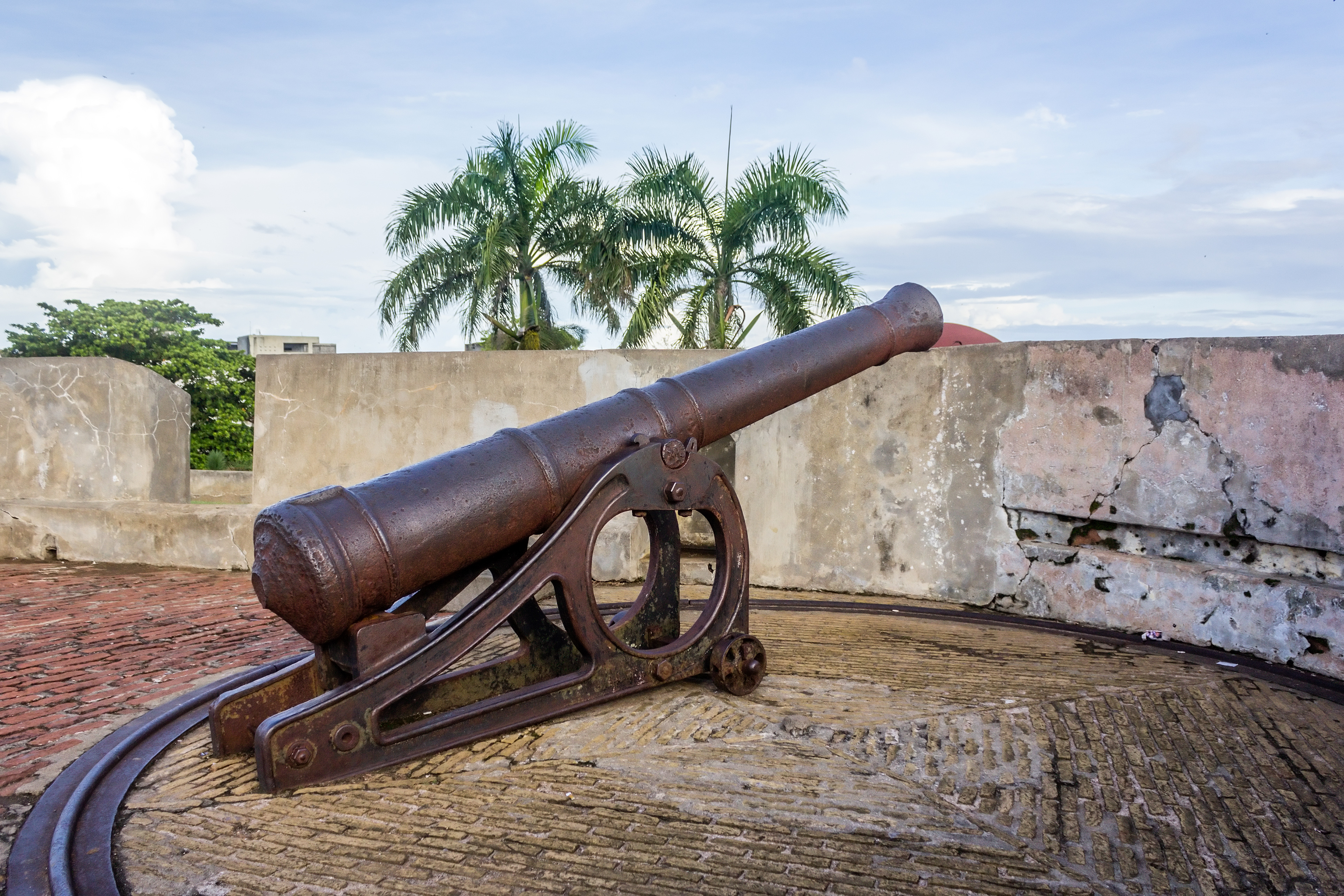

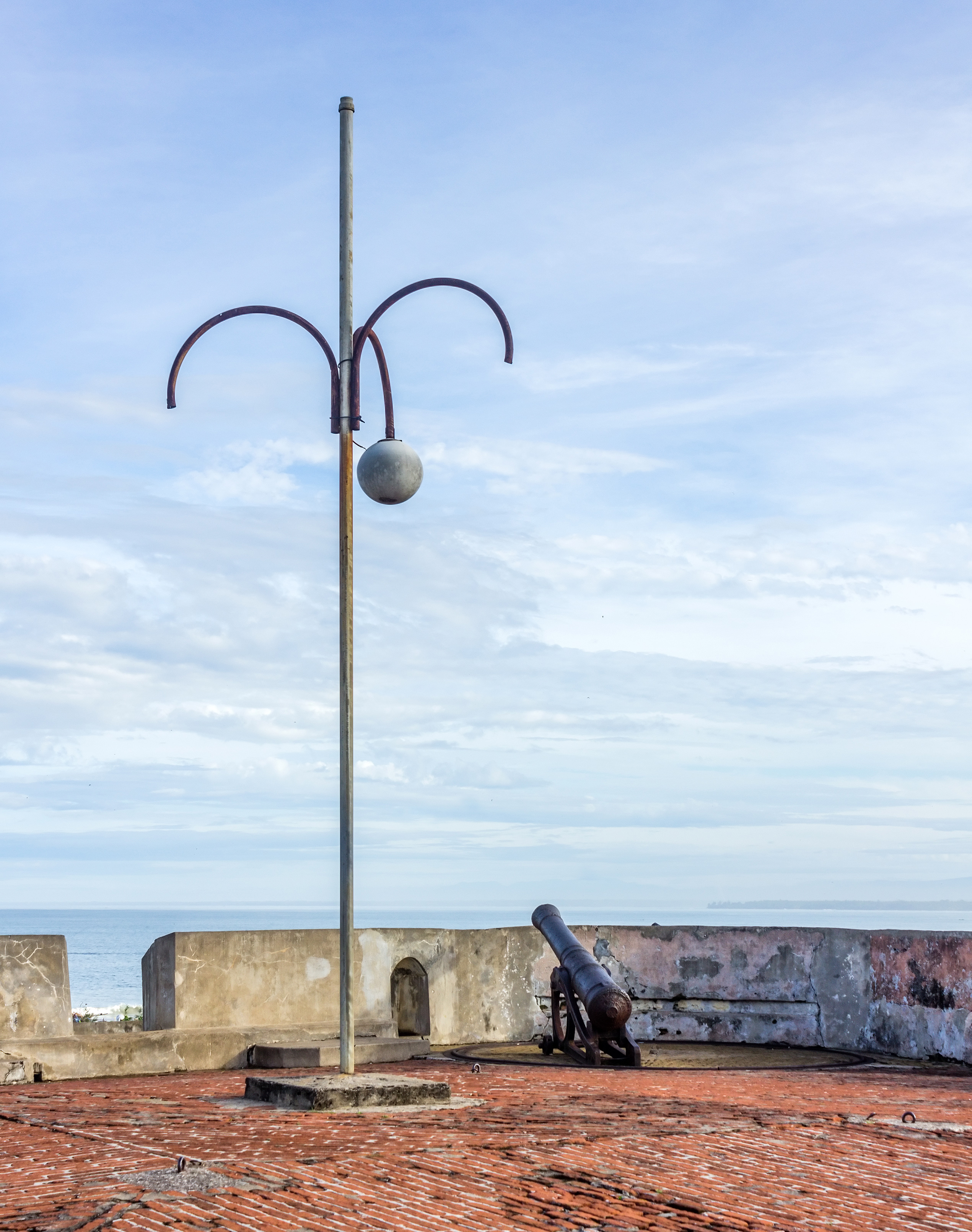

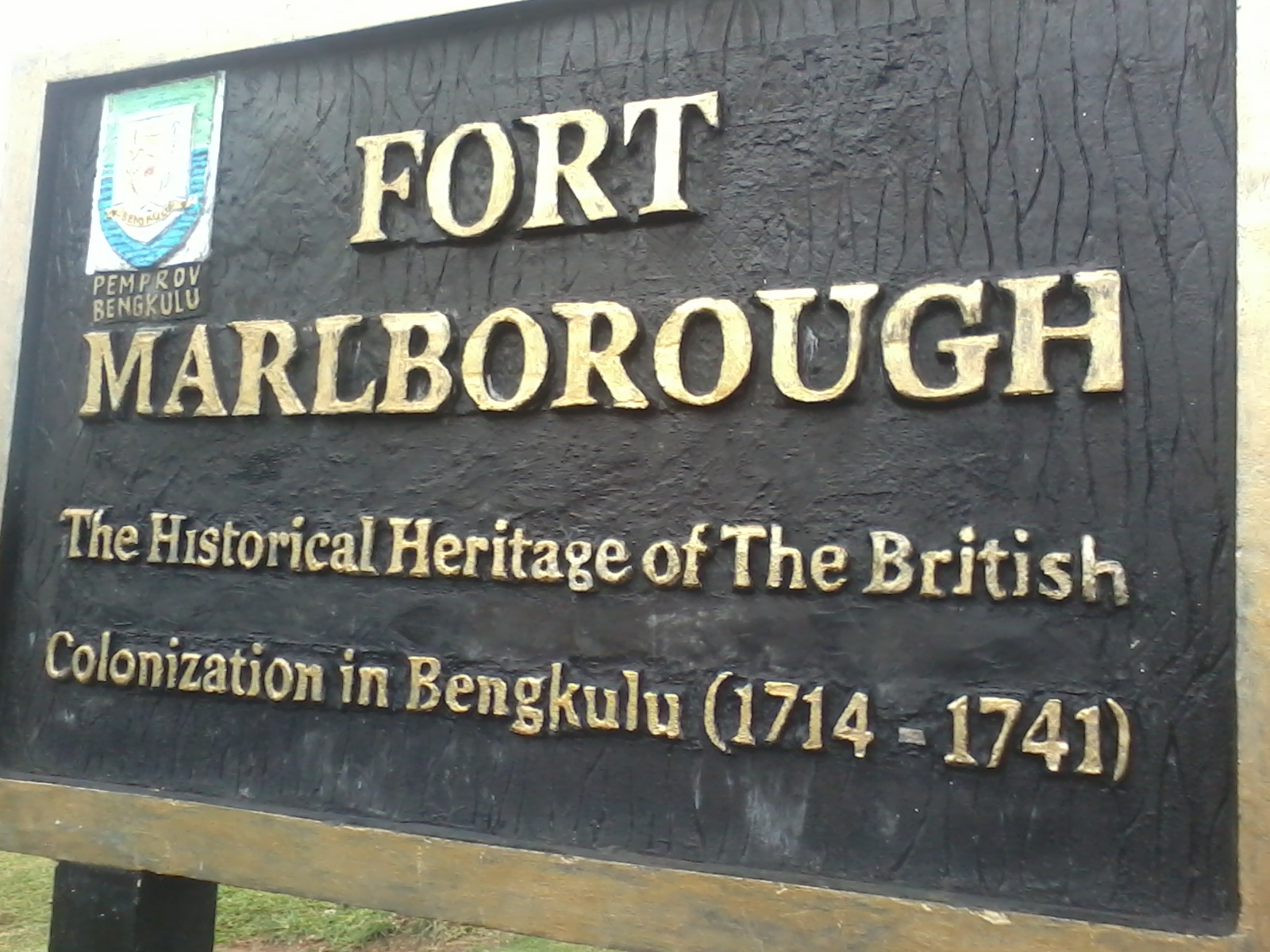

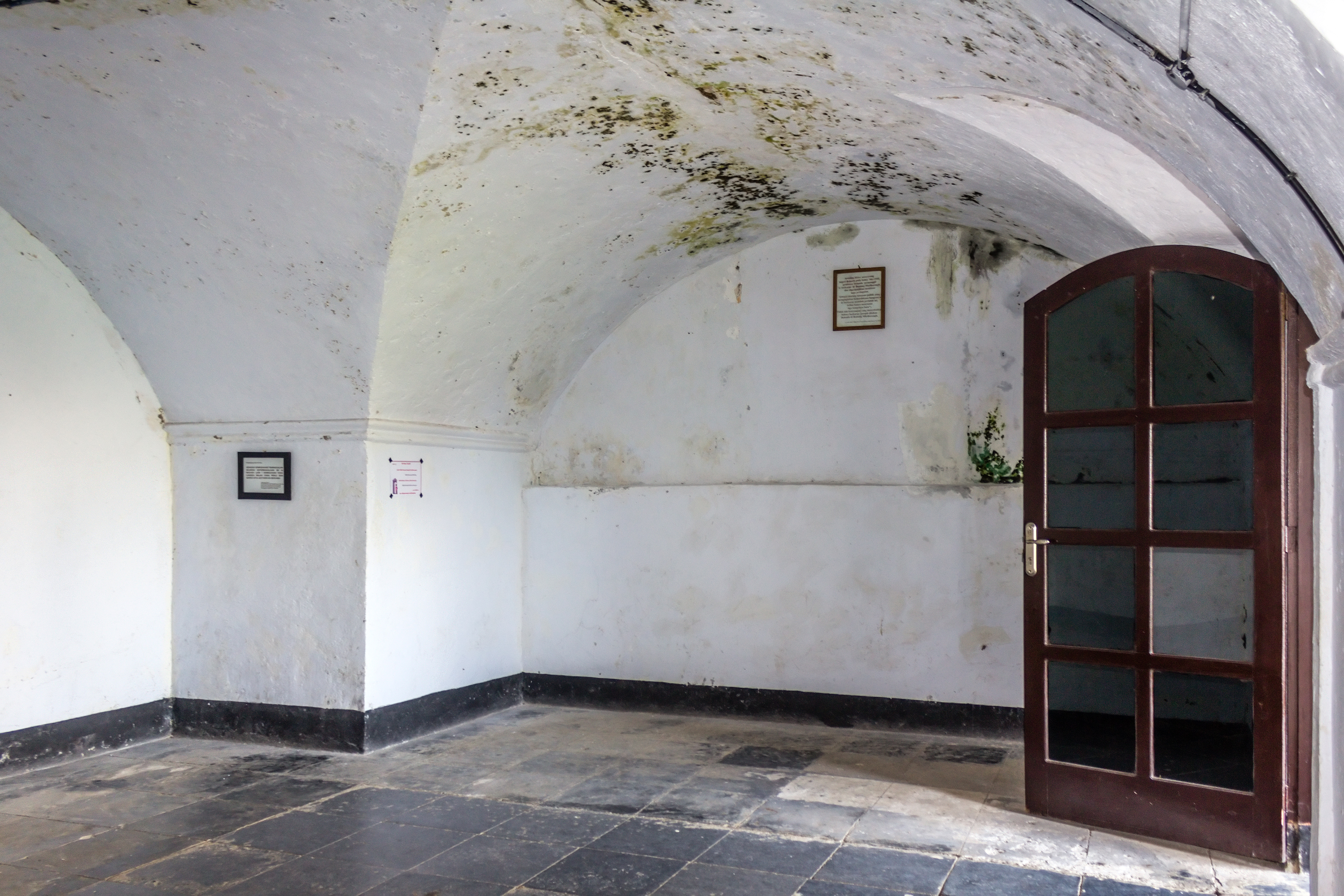

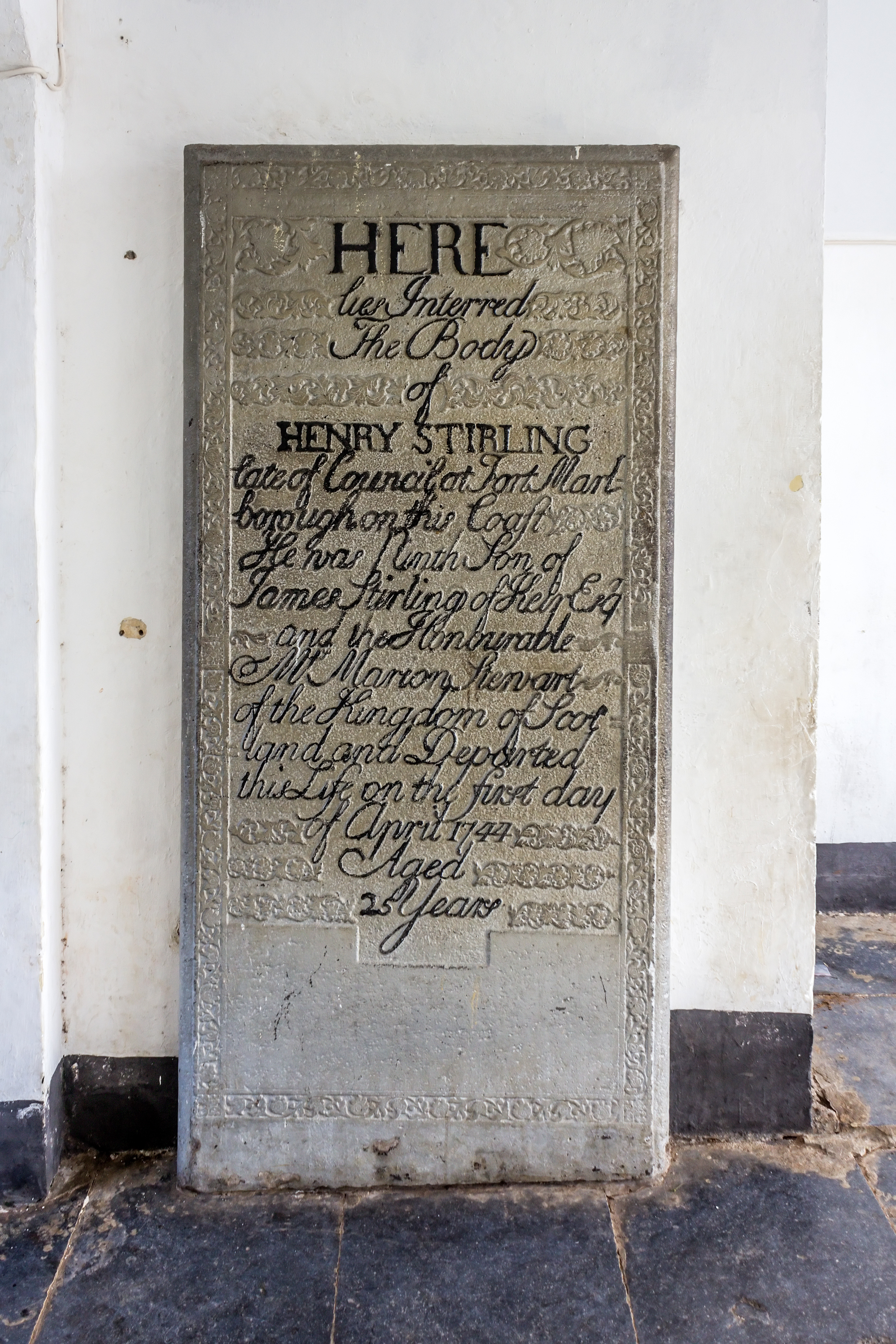

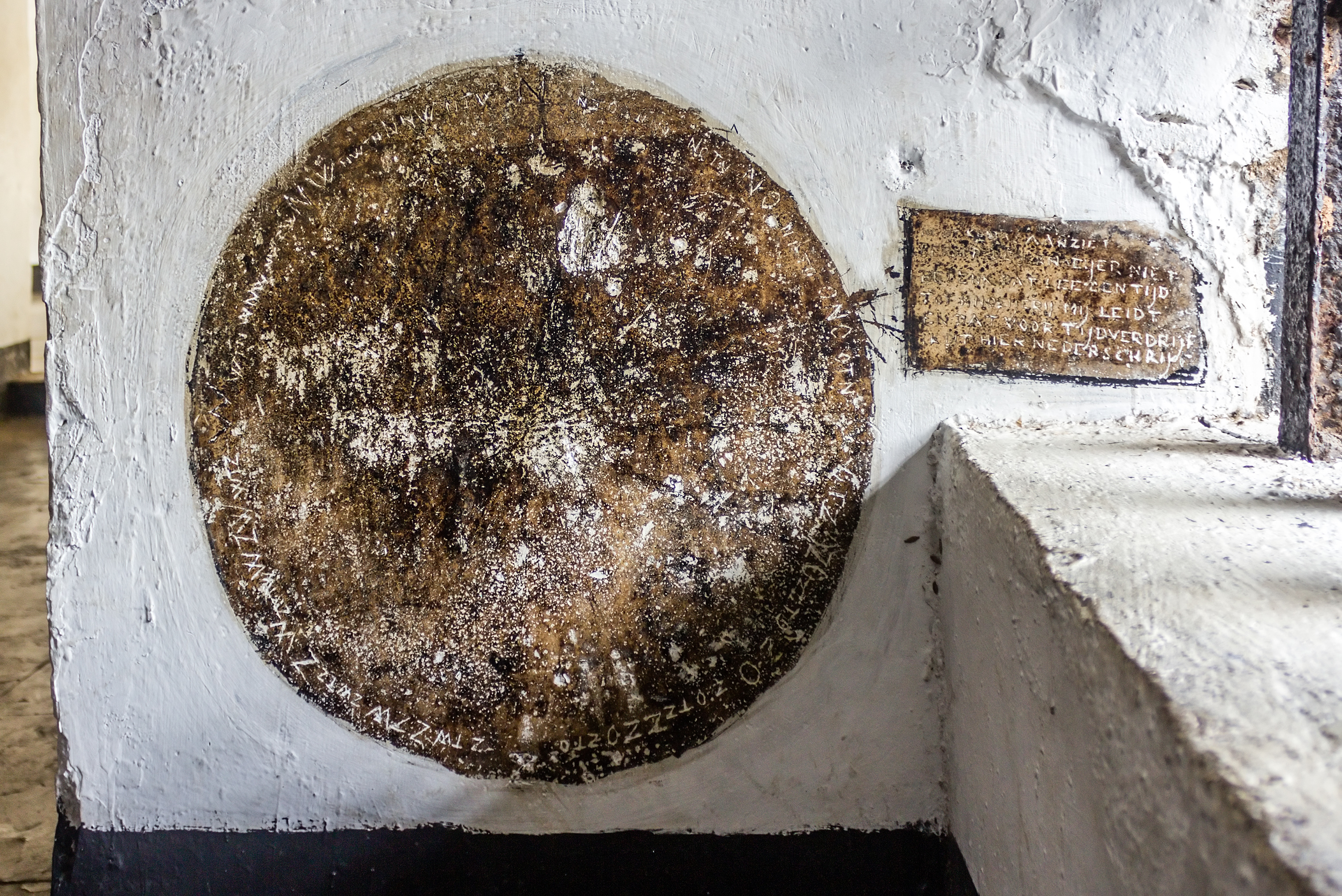

== See also ==
- List of forts
