= PS Kepahiang =

Indonesian football club in Bengkulu

- Full name: Persatuan Sepakbola Kepahiang
- Nicknames: The Highlander; Luwak Merah (Red Civet)
- Founded: 2021; 5 years ago
- Ground: Padang Lekat Stadium; Kepahiang Regency, Bengkulu
- Capacity: 5,000
- Owner: Askab PSSI Kepahiang
- Manager: Roland Yudistira
- Coach: Supran Elvian
- League: Liga 4
- 2021: 2nd in Group A, (Bengkulu zone)
Home colours	Away colours	Third colours

Persatuan Sepakbola Kepahiang (simply known as PS Kepahiang) is an Indonesian football club based in Kepahiang Regency, Bengkulu. They currently compete in the Liga 4.
