= Semarak Stadium =

Football stadium in Bengkulu, Indonesia

- Interactive map of Semarak Stadium
- Location: Bengkulu, Bengkulu Province, Indonesia
- Coordinates: 3°47′35″S 102°16′22″E
- Owner: Bengkulu City Government
- Operator: Bengkulu City Government
- Capacity: 10,000
- Surface: Grass field

Tenants
- Benteng HB; PS Bengkulu; PS IM Bengkulu; Tribrata Rafflesia

Semarak Stadium (Indonesian: Stadion Semarak) is a football stadium in the Sawah Lebar District, Bengkulu City, Indonesia. It is the home stadium of PS Bengkulu. The stadium has a capacity of 10,000.
