= List of districts of Bengkulu =

The province of Bengkulu in Indonesia is divided into regencies which in turn are divided administratively into districts or kecamatan.

The districts of Bengkulu with the regency each falls into are as follows:

- Air Besi, Bengkulu Utara
- Air Dikit, Mukomuko
- Air Manjunto, Mukomuko
- Air Napal, Bengkulu Utara
- Air Nipis, Bengkulu Selatan
- Air Padang, Bengkulu Utara
- Air Periukan, Seluma
- Air Rami, Mukomuko
- Amen, Lebong
- Arga Makmur, Bengkulu Utara
- Arma Jaya, Bengkulu Utara
- Bang Haji, Bengkulu Tengah
- Batik Nau, Bengkulu Utara
- Bermani Ilir, Kepahiang
- Bermani Ulu Raya, Rejang Lebong
- Bermani Ulu, Rejang Lebong
- Binduriang, Rejang Lebong
- Bingin Kuning, Lebong
- Bunga Mas, Bengkulu Selatan
- Curup Selatan, Rejang Lebong
- Curup Tengah, Rejang Lebong
- Curup Timur, Rejang Lebong
- Curup Utara, Rejang Lebong
- Curup, Rejang Lebong
- Enggano, Bengkulu Utara
- Gading Cempaka, Bengkulu
- Giri Mulya, Bengkulu Utara
- Hulu Palik, Bengkulu Utara
- Ilir Talo, Seluma
- Kabawetan, Kepahiang
- Kampung Melayu, Bengkulu
- Karang Tinggi, Bengkulu Tengah
- Kaur Selatan, Kaur
- Kaur Tengah, Kaur
- Kaur Utara, Kaur
- Kedurang Hilir, Bengkulu Selatan
- Kedurang, Bengkulu Selatan
- Kelam Tengah, Kaur
- Kepahiang, Kepahiang
- Kerkap, Bengkulu Utara
- Ketahun, Bengkulu Utara
- Kinal, Kaur
- Kota Padang, Rejang Lebong
- Lebong Atas, Lebong
- Lebong Sakti, Lebong
- Lebong Selatan, Lebong
- Lebong Tengah, Lebong
- Lebong Utara, Lebong
- Luas, Kaur
- Lubuk Pinang, Mukomuko
- Lubuk Sandi, Seluma
- Lungkang Kule, Kaur
- Maje, Kaur
- Malin Deman, Mukomuko
- Manna, Bengkulu Selatan
- Merigi Kelindang, Bengkulu Tengah
- Merigi Sakti, Bengkulu Tengah
- Merigi, Kepahiang
- Muara Aman, Lebong
- Muara Bangkahulu, Bengkulu
- Muara Kemumu, Kepahiang
- Muara Sahung, Kaur
- Mukomuko Selatan, Mukomuko
- Mukomuko Utara, Mukomuko
- Napal Putih, Bengkulu Utara
- Nasal, Kaur
- Padang Bano, Lebong
- Padang Guci Hilir, Kaur
- Padang Guci Hulu, Kaur
- Padang Jaya, Bengkulu Utara
- Padang Ulak Tanding, Rejang Lebong
- Pagar Jati, Bengkulu Tengah
- Pasar Manna, Bengkulu Selatan
- Pelabai, Lebong
- Pematang Tiga, Bengkulu Tengah
- Penarik, Mukomuko
- Pinang Belapis, Lebong
- Pino, Bengkulu Selatan
- Pinoraya, Bengkulu Selatan
- Pondok Kelapa, Bengkulu Tengah
- Pondok Kubang, Bengkulu Tengah
- Pondok Suguh, Mukomuko
- Putri Hijau, Bengkulu Utara
- Ratu Agung, Bengkulu
- Ratu Samban, Bengkulu
- Rimbo Pengadang, Lebong
- Seberang Musi, Kepahiang
- Seginim, Bengkulu Selatan
- Selagan Raya, Mukomuko
- Selebar, Bengkulu
- Seluma Barat, Seluma
- Seluma Selatan, Seluma
- Seluma Timur, Seluma
- Seluma Utara, Seluma
- Seluma, Seluma
- Selupu Rejang, Rejang Lebong
- Semidang Alas Maras, Seluma
- Semidang Alas, Seluma
- Semidang Gumai, Kaur
- Sindang Beliti Ilir, Rejang Lebong
- Sindang Beliti Ulu, Rejang Lebong
- Sindang Dataran, Rejang Lebong
- Sindang Kelingi, Rejang Lebong
- Sukaraja, Seluma
- Sungai Rumbai, Mukomuko
- Sungai Serut, Bengkulu
- Taba Penanjung, Bengkulu Tengah
- Talang Empat, Bengkulu Tengah
- Talo Kecil, Seluma
- Talo, Seluma
- Tanjung Agung Palik, Bengkulu Utara
- Tanjung Kemuning, Kaur
- Tebat Karai, Kepahiang
- Teluk Segara, Bengkulu
- Teramang Jaya, Mukomuko
- Teras Terunjam, Mukomuko
- Tetap, Kaur
- Topos, Lebong
- Ujan Mas, Kepahiang
- Ulu Manna, Bengkulu Selatan
- Ulu Talo, Seluma
- Uram Jaya, Lebong
- V Koto, Mukomuko
- XIV Koto, Mukomuko
