= Gurita Kaur F.C. =

Indonesian football club in Bengkulu

Gurita Kaur FC
- Full name: Gurita Kaur Football Club
- Nickname: Gurita Gila (The Mad Octopus)
- Short name: GKFC
- Founded: 10 November 2021; 4 years ago
- Ground: Merdeka Bintuhan Field; Kaur, Bengkulu
- Capacity: 3,090
- Owner: Askab PSSI Kaur
- Chairman: Slamet Ambyah
- Manager: Edi Supanlis
- Coach: Frangky
- League: Liga 4
- 2023: 5th in Group B, (Bengkulu zone)
Home colours	Away colours

Gurita Kaur Football Club (simply known as Gurita Kaur) is an Indonesian football club based in Kaur Regency, Bengkulu. The club competes in the Liga 4 and their homeground is Merdeka Bintuhan Field.
