= Benteng HB F.C. =

Indonesian football club

Benteng HB
- Full name: Bengkulu Tengah Harapan Bangsa Football Club
- Nickname: Laskar Harapan Bangsa
- Founded: 2021; 5 years ago
- Ground: Semarak Stadium
- Capacity: 10,000
- Owner: PSSI Central Bengkulu
- Chairman: Edi Ramli
- Coach: Abdullah Sapei
- League: Liga 4
- 2023: 3rd in Group B, (Bengkulu zone)
Home colours	Away colours

Bengkulu Tengah Harapan Bangsa Football Club, commonly known as Benteng HB, is an Indonesian football team based in Central Bengkulu Regency, Bengkulu. They currently competes in Liga 4.

== Honours ==
- Liga 3 Bengkulu
  - Champion (1): 2021
