= Bengkulu (city) =

Capital and largest city of Bengkulu, Indonesia

- City
- City of Bengkulu; Kota Bengkulu
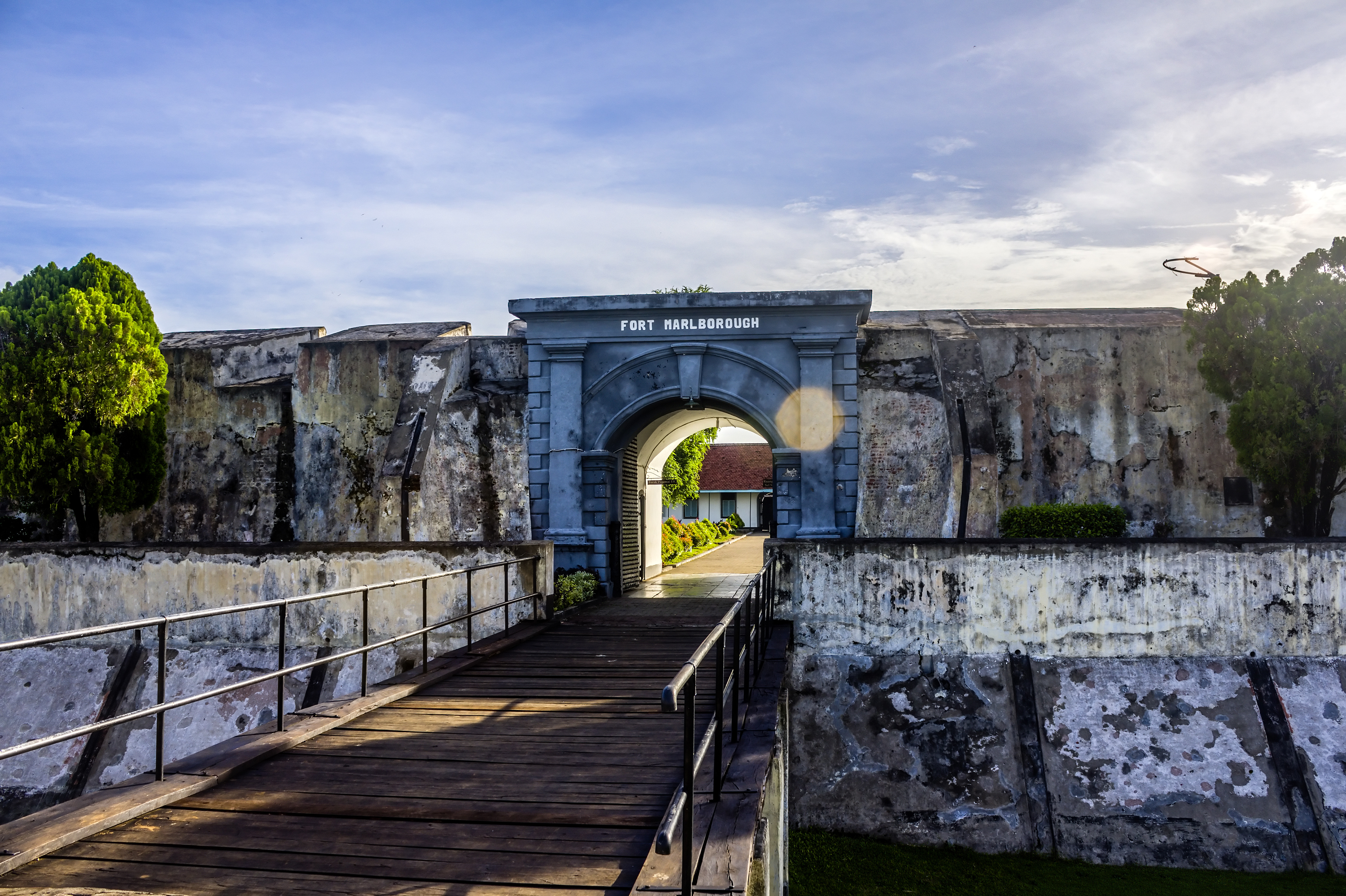
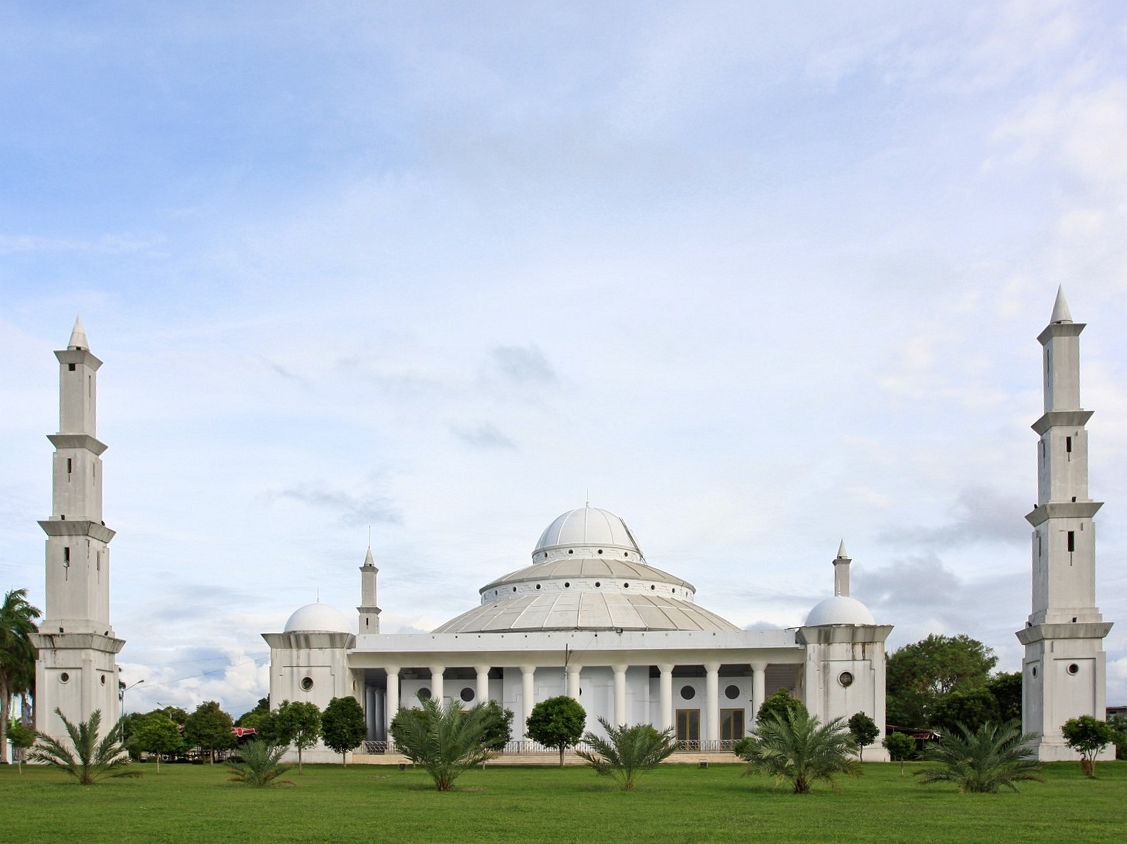
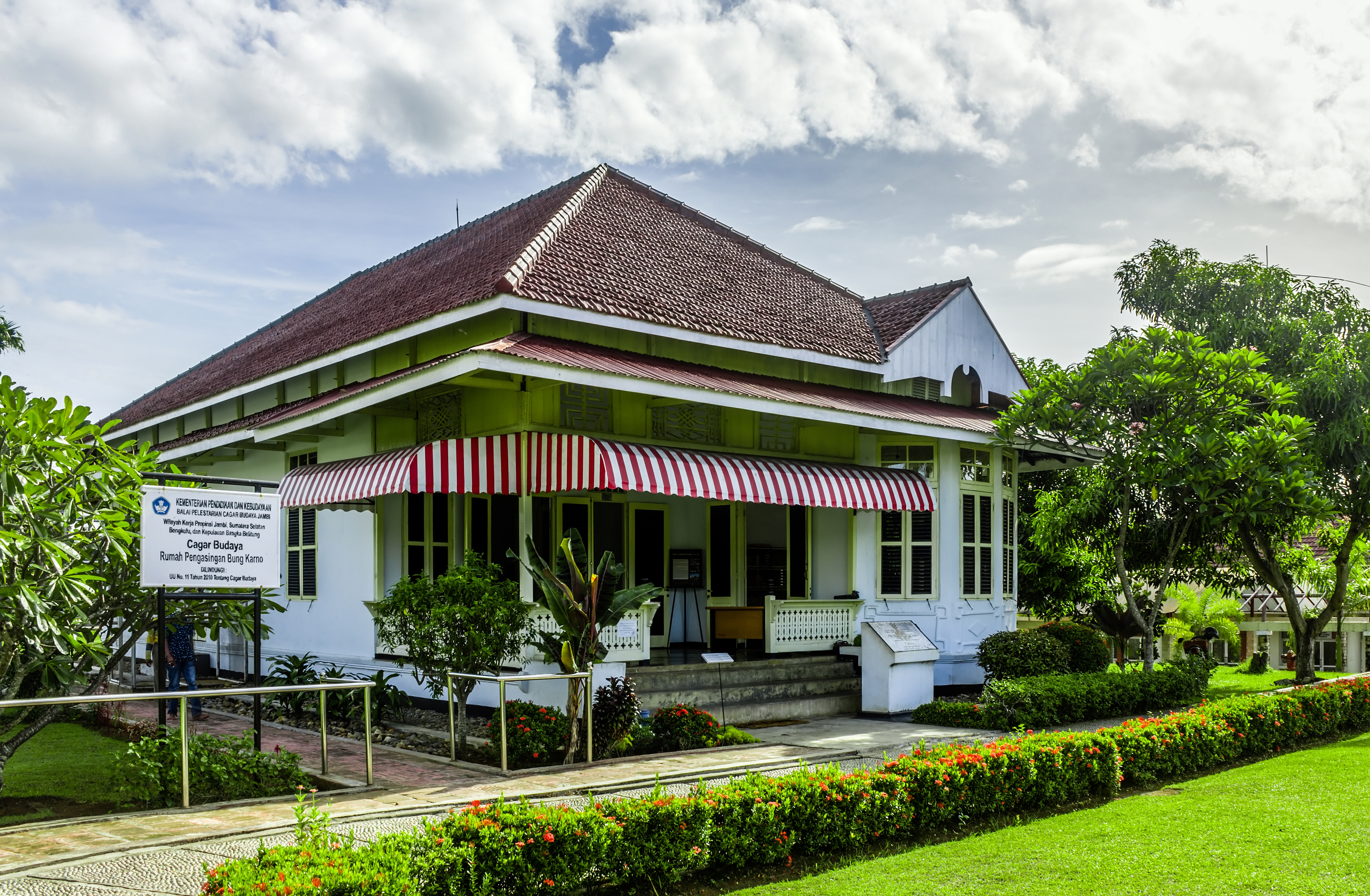
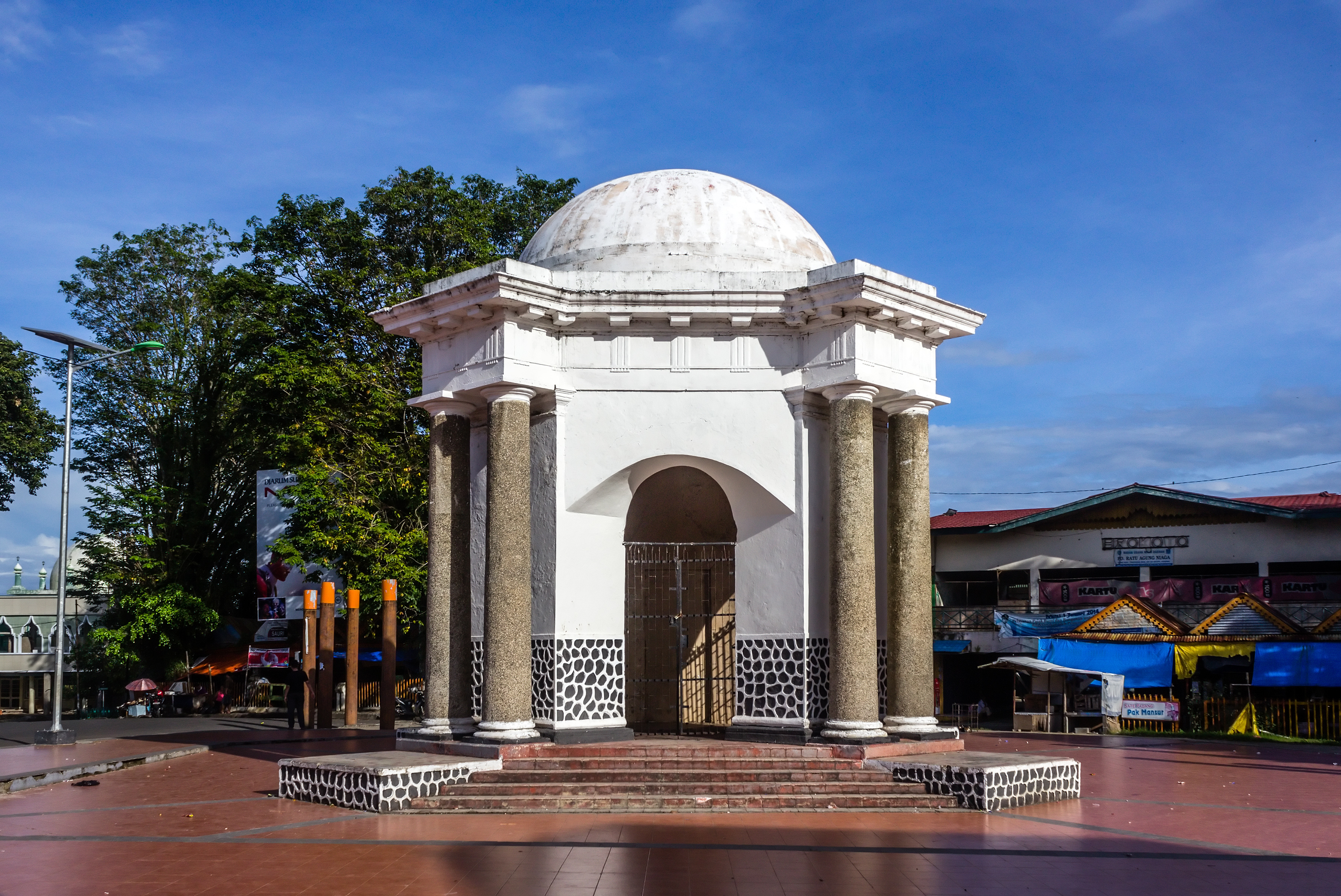
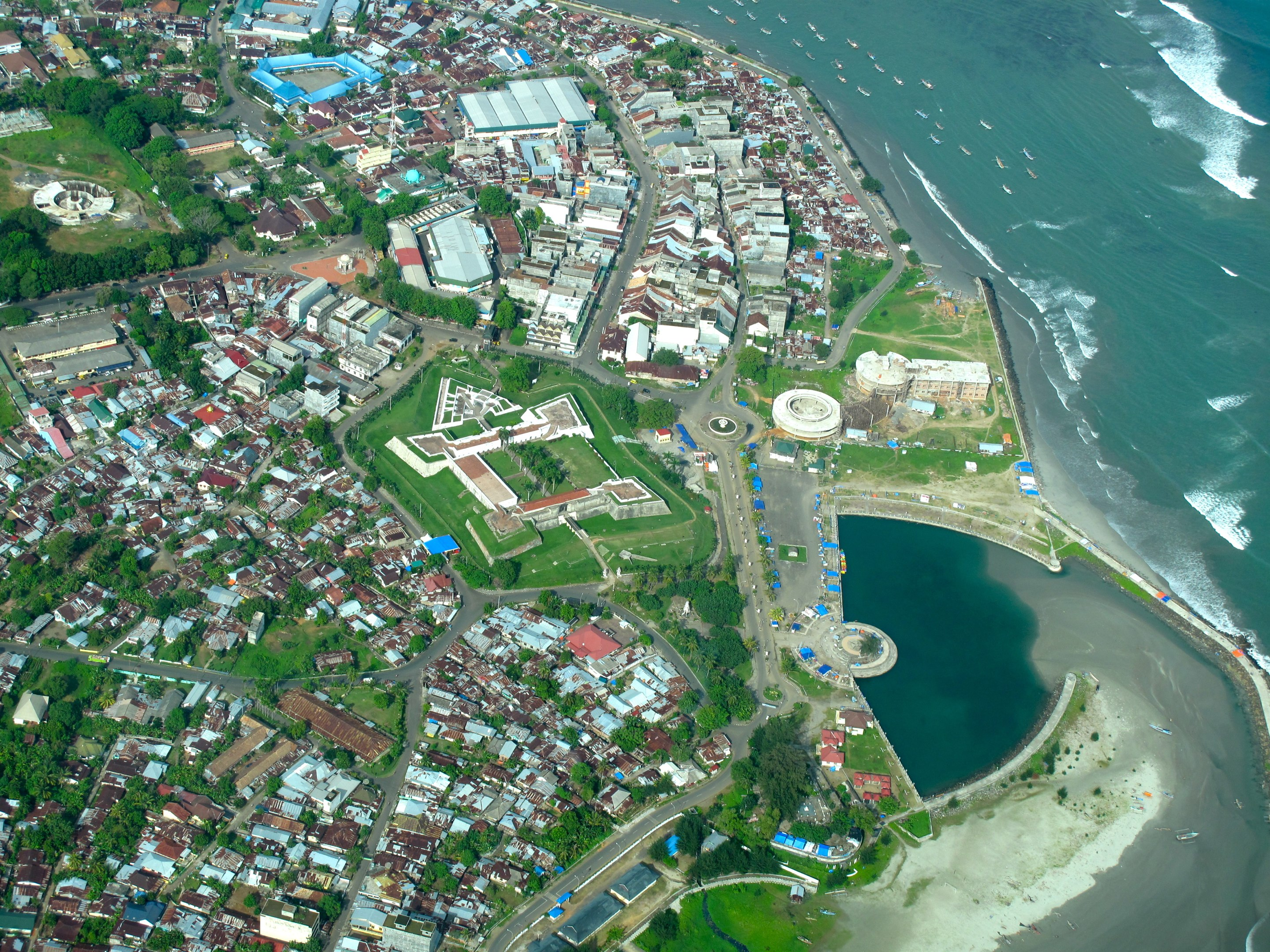
- Clockwise from top left : Fort Marlborough, At-Taqwa Grand Mosque, Thomas Parr Monument, Aerial view of Bengkulu City, and Bung Karno Seclusion House

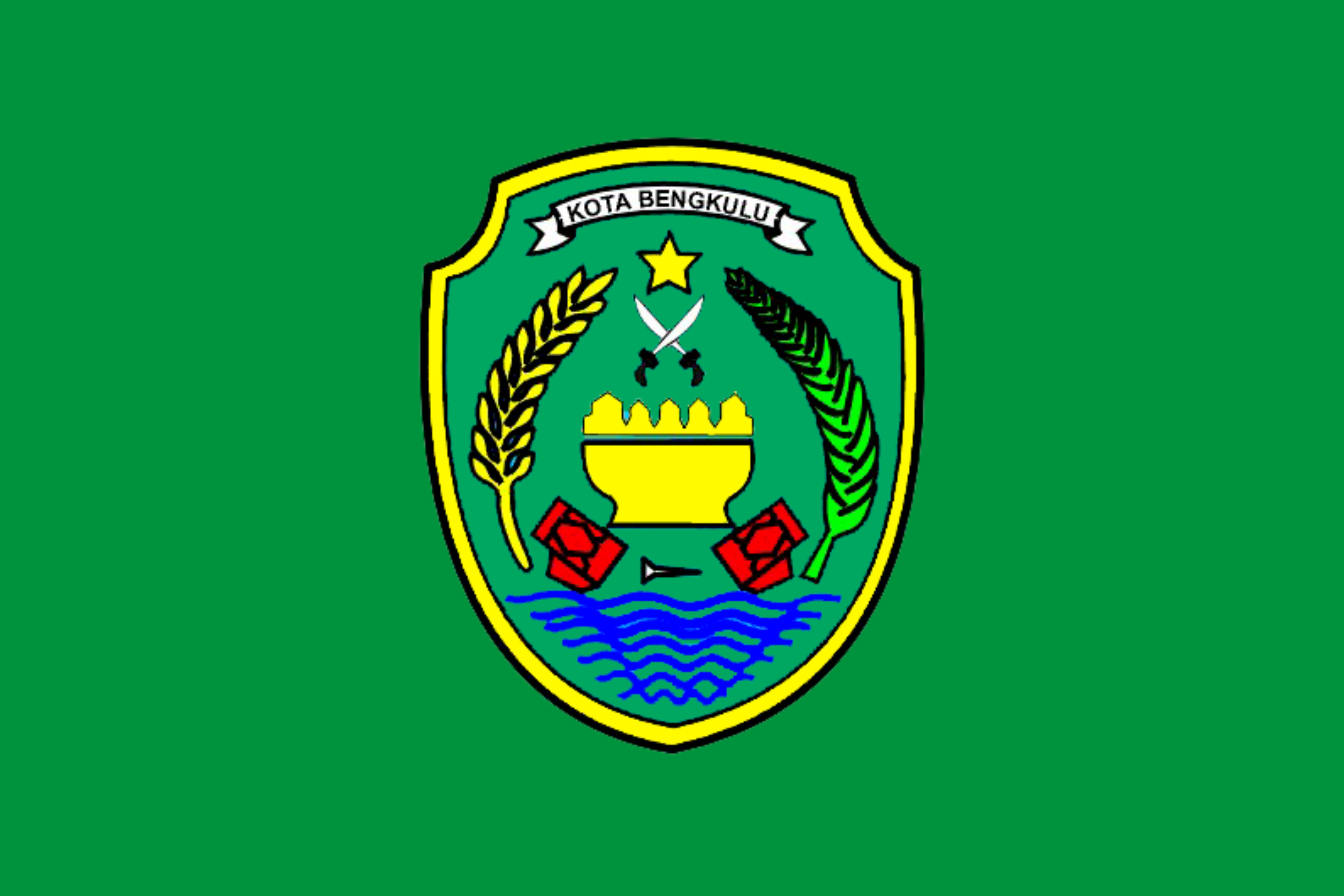
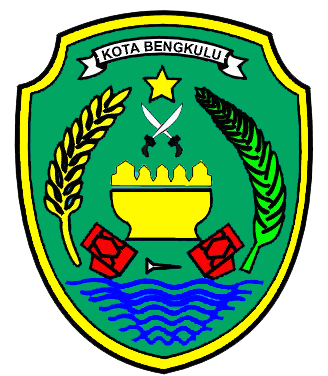
- Flag Coat of arms

- Location within Bengkulu Province

- Location in Sumatra and Indonesia Bengkulu (Indonesia)
- Coordinates: 3°47′44″S 102°15′33″E
- Country: Indonesia
- Province: Bengkulu
- Founded: 18 March 1719

Government
  - Mayor: Dedy Wahyudi
  - Vice Mayor: Ronny Tobing
  - Legislature: Bengkulu City Regional House of Representatives (DPRD)

Area
  - Total: 151.72 km^{2} (58.58 sq mi)
- Elevation: 2 m (6.6 ft)

Population (mid 2025 estimate)
  - Total: 407,843
  - Density: 2,688.1/km^{2} (6,962.2/sq mi)
- Time zone: UTC+7 (Indonesia Western Time)
- Area code: (+62) 736
- Website: bengkulukota.go.id

Bengkulu, formerly Bencoolen (Dutch: Benkoelen) is the capital of the Indonesian province of Bengkulu. The city is the second largest city on the west coast of Sumatra Island after Padang. Previously this area was under the influence of the kingdom of Inderapura and the Sultanate of Banten. The city also became the place of exile of Sukarno from 1939 to 1942. It covers an area of 151.72 km^{2} and had a population of 373,591 at the 2020 Census; the official estimate as of mid 2025 was 407,843 (comprising 205,209 males and 202,634 females).

== History ==
Pre-Colonial Era and Local Kingdoms

The Bengkulu region was historically inhabited by various ethnic communities and small local chiefdoms (kedatuan), including settlements in Sungai Serut, Sungai Lemau, Selebar, and surrounding coastal areas. The region was influenced by broader maritime trading networks across western Sumatra and the Indian Ocean. Historical records suggest that the area was connected to the sphere of influence of the Srivijaya during the early medieval period, although direct control over Bengkulu is not well documented.

From around the 15th century, Bengkulu became associated with the Banten Sultanate through trade and political relations. Pepper from the west coast of Sumatra became an important commodity in regional trade networks. During the 17th century, the region was also influenced by the Inderapura Kingdom, a Minangkabau-linked coastal kingdom centered in present-day West Sumatra.

British and Dutch Colonial Era

The British East India Company established Bengkulu, known to the British as Bencoolen, in 1685 as a trading center for pepper and other commodities, after losing access to Banten following the expansion of Dutch East India Company influence in the region.

In 1714, the British constructed Fort Marlborough, one of the largest British forts in Southeast Asia. Despite its strategic role, Bencoolen was considered economically difficult due to its remote location, challenging climate, and limited commercial success.

Under the terms of the Anglo-Dutch Treaty of 1824, the British ceded Bencoolen to the Dutch in exchange for Malacca. Bengkulu subsequently became part of the Dutch East Indies until the Japanese occupation during World War II.

Indonesian Independence and Modern Era

During the 1930s, Sukarno was exiled to Bengkulu by the Dutch colonial government. During his stay, he met Fatmawati, who later became his wife and Indonesia’s first First Lady.

After Indonesian independence, Bengkulu initially became part of South Sumatra Province before officially becoming the capital of the newly established Bengkulu Province in 1968 under Law No. 9 of 1967. Since then, the city has developed as the administrative, economic, and educational center of the province.

== Geography ==
Bengkulu is located on the western coast of the island of Sumatra, facing the Indian Ocean. The city covers an area of approximately 151.72 square kilometres and lies along a coastal plain bordered by the Bukit Barisan mountain range to the east.

The city is situated near the Sunda megathrust, making it vulnerable to earthquakes and tsunamis. Due to its location along the western coast of Sumatra, the region is considered one of Indonesia’s areas most vulnerable to seismic activity and potential tsunami hazards.

== Administrative districts ==
The City of Bengkulu comprised 8 administrative districts (kecamatan) at the time of the 2010 Census, but subsequently, the 9th district (Singaran Pati) was formed out of the northwest half of the existing Gading Cempaka District. The districts are listed below with their areas and their populations at the 2010 Census and the 2020 Census, together with the official estimates as of mid 2025. The table also includes the numbers of urban villages (kelurahan) in each district and its postcodes.

| Kode Wilayah | Name of District (kecamatan) | Area in km^{2} | Pop'n Census 2010 | Pop'n Census 2020 | Pop'n Estimate mid 2025 | No. of villages | Post codes |
|---|---|---|---|---|---|---|---|
| 17.71.01 | Selebar | 54.25 | 46,211 | 79,498 | 93,420 | 6 | 38211, 38213, 38214, 38216 |
| 17.71.05 | Kampung Melayu | 21.08 | 28,372 | 43,986 | 41,796 | 6 | 38215, 38216 |
| 17.71.02 | Gading Cempaka | 9.44 | 78,767 | 38,848 | 39,257 | 5 | 38221, 38225, 38229 |
| 17.71.06 | Ratu Agung | 10.95 | 49,255 | 50,562 | 52,293 | 8 | 38223, 38224, 38227, 38228 |
| 17.71.07 | Ratu Samban | 2.84 | 24,624 | 21,344 | 20,656 | 9 | 38221, 38222, 38223, 38227 |
| 17.71.09 | Singaran Pati | 11.10 | ^{(a)} | 41,304 | 40,678 | 6 | 38221, 38224, 38226, 38229 |
| 17.71.03 | Teluk Segara | 4.57 | 23,998 | 22,041 | 21,330 | 13 | !38113 - 38119 |
| 17.71.08 | Sungai Serut | 13.53 | 21,981 | 25,255 | 26,711 | 7 | 38119 |
| 17.71.04 | Muara Bangka Hulu | 23.96 | 35,336 | 50,663 | 56,743 | 7 | 38121, 38122, 38125, 38126 |
| | Totals | 151.72 | 308,544 | 373,591 | 407,843 | 67 | |

Note: (a) the 2010 population of the new Singaran Pati District is included in the figure for Gading Cempaka District, from which it was later split off.

== Climate ==
Bengkulu has a tropical rainforest climate (Af) under the Köppen climate classification, characterized by consistently high temperatures, high humidity, and heavy rainfall throughout the year. Due to its location along the western coast of Sumatra facing the Indian Ocean, the city experiences abundant precipitation with no distinct dry season.

Average temperatures in Bengkulu remain relatively stable year-round, typically ranging between 23 °C and 31 °C. The city frequently experiences cloudy and humid conditions, especially during periods of intensified monsoon activity over the Indian Ocean.

Climate data for Bengkulu (Fatmawati Soekarno Airport) (1991–2020 normals)
| Month | Jan | Feb | Mar | Apr | May | Jun | Jul | Aug | Sep | Oct | Nov | Dec | Year |
|---|---|---|---|---|---|---|---|---|---|---|---|---|---|
| Mean daily maximum °C (°F) | 31.0 (87.8) | 31.5 (88.7) | 31.9 (89.4) | 31.6 (88.9) | 32.0 (89.6) | 31.6 (88.9) | 31.2 (88.2) | 31.2 (88.2) | 31.1 (88.0) | 31.3 (88.3) | 31.0 (87.8) | 30.7 (87.3) | 31.3 (88.4) |
| Daily mean °C (°F) | 26.6 (79.9) | 26.9 (80.4) | 27.1 (80.8) | 27.2 (81.0) | 27.4 (81.3) | 27.2 (81.0) | 26.7 (80.1) | 26.6 (79.9) | 26.6 (79.9) | 26.7 (80.1) | 26.5 (79.7) | 26.4 (79.5) | 26.8 (80.3) |
| Mean daily minimum °C (°F) | 23.3 (73.9) | 23.3 (73.9) | 23.4 (74.1) | 23.6 (74.5) | 23.8 (74.8) | 23.4 (74.1) | 22.7 (72.9) | 22.6 (72.7) | 22.8 (73.0) | 23.3 (73.9) | 23.4 (74.1) | 23.1 (73.6) | 23.2 (73.8) |
| Average precipitation mm (inches) | 322.6 (12.70) | 243.3 (9.58) | 266.6 (10.50) | 274.1 (10.79) | 223.8 (8.81) | 157.2 (6.19) | 165.8 (6.53) | 197.4 (7.77) | 176.5 (6.95) | 276.3 (10.88) | 368.0 (14.49) | 404.1 (15.91) | 3,075.7 (121.1) |
| Average precipitation days | 16.4 | 14.0 | 14.4 | 14.4 | 11.6 | 8.9 | 9.2 | 8.8 | 9.7 | 13.9 | 17.7 | 20.0 | 159 |
Source: Starlings Roost Weather

== Governance ==
Based on Emergency Law Number 6 Year 1956, Bengkulu was one of the Small Town with an area of 17.6 km^{2} in South Sumatera province. The mention of this Small Town then changed to Kotamadya based on Law No. 1 of 1957 on the subject of local government. After the issuance of Law Number 9 Year 1967 regarding the establishment of Bengkulu Province, Bengkulu Municipality as well as being the capital of the province. However, the law only came into force on 1 June 1968 after the issuance of Government Regulation No. 20/1968.

Based on the Decree of the Provincial Governor of Bengkulu No. 821.27-039 dated 22 January 1981, the Municipality of Bengkulu was subsequently divided into two districts namely Teluk Segara District and Gading Cempaka District. With the enactment of the Decree of the Mayor of Bengkulu Region No. 440 and 444 of 1981 and reinforced by the Decree of the Governor of Bengkulu No. 141 of 1982 on 1 October 1982, the mention of the territory of Kedatukan was erased and Pemangkuan became kelurahan. Furthermore, based on Government Regulation No. 41 of 1982, Bengkulu Region Second Level Region consists of 2 Definitive Districts with Teluk Segara District overseeing 17 villages and Gading Cempaka District overseeing 21 urban villages. Then based on Government Regulation No. 46 of 1986, the area of Bengkulu Municipality was increased to 151.7 km^{2} and consisted of four districts, comprising 38 urban villages (kelurahan) and 17 rural villages (desa). Another five districts were later added by splitting these four.

== Transportation ==
Bengkulu is connected to other parts of Sumatra and Indonesia through road, air, and sea transportation networks. The city serves as a regional transportation hub for Bengkulu Province.

Air Transport

The city is served by Fatmawati Soekarno Airport, located southeast of the city center. The airport operates domestic flights connecting Bengkulu with major Indonesian cities, particularly Jakarta. The airport has undergone several renovations and expansions to improve passenger facilities and regional connectivity.

Sea Transport

Bengkulu’s main seaport is Pulau Baai Port, which handles cargo shipping, inter-island transportation, and regional maritime activities. The port also serves as the primary gateway for ferry services to Enggano Island, one of Indonesia’s outer islands located in the Indian Ocean.

Roads

The city is connected to neighboring regions through the Trans-Sumatran road network, which links Bengkulu with other cities and provinces across Sumatra. Urban roads and infrastructure have continued to develop alongside population growth and economic activity in the city.

== Media ==
Bengkulu has a growing regional media sector consisting of newspapers, television stations, radio broadcasters, and online news platforms.

Local newspapers include Rakyat Bengkulu, which is part of the Jawa Pos Group network, as well as Bengkulu Ekspress and Radar Bengkulu. These publications cover regional news, politics, business, culture, and local events throughout Bengkulu Province.

The city is also served by several television broadcasters, including RBTV and BETV. In addition, TVRI Bengkulu operates as the regional branch of Indonesia’s public broadcasting network, providing local news and programming for Bengkulu and surrounding areas.

Radio broadcasting and digital media platforms also play an important role in the dissemination of information and entertainment in the city.

== Demographics ==
Bengkulu is one of the most populous urban centers on the western coast of Sumatra. The city has a diverse population consisting of various ethnic groups, including Malay, Rejang, Serawai, Minangkabau, Javanese, Chinese Indonesians, Batak, and other communities from across Indonesia.

Indonesian (Bahasa Indonesia) is the official language used in government, education, and public life, while regional languages such as Bengkulu Malay and Rejang are also spoken by local communities.

The majority of the population adheres to Islam, with smaller Christian, Buddhist, Hindu, and Confucian communities also present in the city. Bengkulu’s cultural diversity reflects its historical role as a coastal trading center that connected western Sumatra with other parts of the Indonesian archipelago and the Indian Ocean region.

== Economy ==
The economy of Bengkulu is primarily supported by the trade, service, government, education, fisheries, and tourism sectors. As the capital of Bengkulu Province, the city functions as the administrative and economic center of the region.

Trade and small-to-medium enterprises (UMKM) play an important role in the local economy, particularly in retail, food production, transportation, and hospitality services. Traditional markets and modern shopping centers operate throughout the city, serving both urban residents and nearby districts.

The city also benefits from coastal economic activities, including fisheries and marine-related businesses along the western coast of Sumatra. Tourism has increasingly contributed to the economy due to attractions such as beaches, historical landmarks, and cultural festivals, especially the annual Tabot celebration.

Historically, Bengkulu was known during the colonial period for the export of commodities such as pepper, nutmeg, coffee, and other agricultural products. Under British and later Dutch rule, plantations and trade networks played a major role in the regional economy.

== Tourism ==
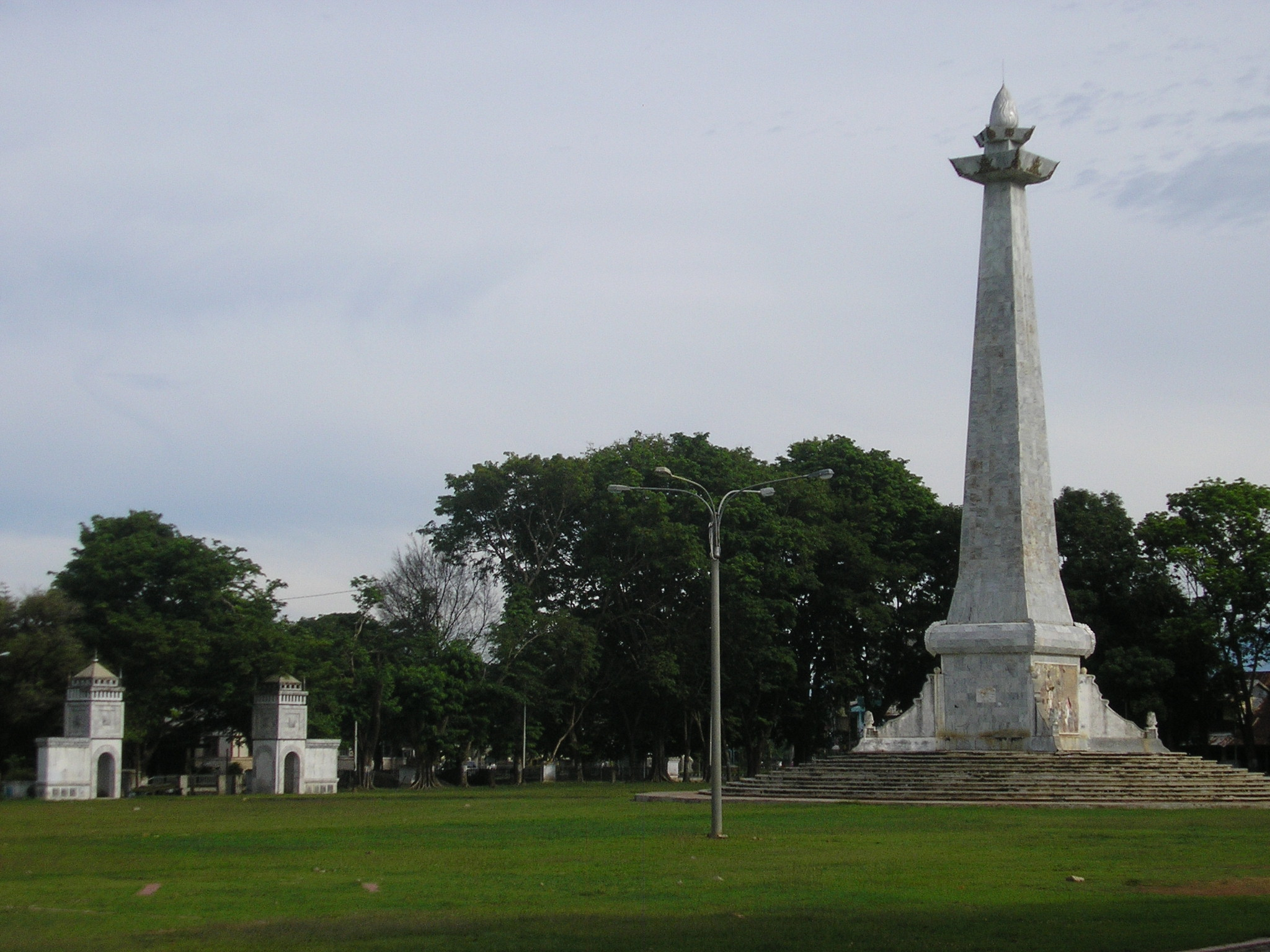
A square in Bengkulu City.

The city has several British heritage buildings and fortresses, including Fort Marlborough, founded in 1713 on Long Beach, the Hamilton Monument and the Thomas Parr Monument in the downtown area, Sukarno's exile house on Soekarno-Hatta Street, and the Jamik Mosque designed by Sukarno. Bengkulu City also has several other attractions, such as Chinatown, Tapak Paderi Beach, Jakat Beach, Dendam Tak Sudah Lake, and Pulau Baai Harbor. This area has been designated by the local government as a souvenir center. Bengkulu City also has a variety of durian products. These can be found in Pondok Durian Bengkulu, where processed durian is available, including durian ice cream, durian toast, and durian pancakes.

== Culture ==
One of the city’s most prominent cultural events is the Tabot Festival, held annually during the Islamic month of Muharram. The centuries-old tradition was introduced by workers and artisans from Madras, British India, who were brought to Bengkulu during the construction of Fort Marlborough under British rule in the late 18th century.

The festival commemorates the martyrdom of Hussein ibn Ali at the Battle of Karbala, an event of great significance in Shia Islam. Over time, Tabot evolved into a unique cultural tradition in Bengkulu that blends religious symbolism with local customs. The celebration features large ceremonial structures known as tabot, accompanied by parades, traditional music, drumming performances, dances, and various community events.

In modern times, Tabot has become one of Bengkulu’s largest annual cultural festivals and an important attraction for domestic tourists.

== Education ==
Education in Bengkulu has developed significantly since the colonial era. During the Dutch colonial period, formal education in the city was limited and primarily intended for administrative and missionary purposes. By 1832, Bengkulu had two Lancasterian-method Dutch schools, where students studied subjects such as mathematics, religion, and the Malay language. One of the schools reportedly used a Malay translation of the New Testament produced during the British administration under Robert Boyle.

Following Indonesian independence, access to education expanded rapidly through the establishment of public schools, and higher education institutions. Bengkulu is now one of the main educational centers in southwestern Sumatra, serving students from across the province and nearby regions.

The city is home to University of Bengkulu, the largest public university in the province, which was established in 1982. The university offers programs in fields such as education, engineering, agriculture, economics, law, and medicine. Several private higher education institutions and vocational academies also operate in the city.

Educational development in the city has continued alongside urban growth, with increasing emphasis on literacy, teacher training, and digital learning infrastructure in the 21st century.

== See also ==
- Kebun Gerand

== Bibliography ==
- Ricklefs, M. C., A History of Modern Indonesia since c. 1300 (2de édition), 1993
