= Mukomuko =

Mukomuko may refer to:

- Mukomuko Regency, Bengkulu province, Indonesia
  - Mukomuko city, regency seat
  - Mukomuko Airport, in Mukomuko city
  - Mukomuko people, an ethnic group inhabiting the regency
  - Mukomuko language, language of the Mukomuko people
