= Mukomuko language =

Language of Indonesia

Mukomuko
- Bahaso Mukomuko
- Native to: Indonesia (Bengkulu)
- Region: Mukomuko Regency
- Ethnicity: Mukomuko
- Native speakers: (26,000 cited 1993)
- Language family: Austronesian: Malayo-Polynesian; disputed: Malayo-Sumbawan or Greater North Borneo; Malayic; Minangkabau; Mukomuko
- Dialects: Northern Mukomuko Southern Mukomuko
- Writing system: Latin (Indonesian alphabet)

Language codes
- ISO 639-3: vmo (retired and subsumed into min)
- Glottolog: muko1237
- Areas where Mukomuko language is a majority

The Mukomuko language (bahaso Mukomuko) is a language in the Minangkabau language family spoken by the Mukomuko people, a subgroup of the Minangkabau people living in Mukomuko Regency in northern Bengkulu that borders West Sumatra. In 1993, there were an estimated 26,000 Mukomuko speakers. Mukomuko is closely related to the Minangkabau language and shares similarities with the Pancung Soal dialect, spoken in the southern part of Pesisir Selatan Regency in West Sumatra. The distribution area of this dialect also extends to the northern part of Mukomuko Regency. Geographically, Mukomuko is situated on the border between Bengkulu and West Sumatra, which fosters interaction between the people of Mukomuko and the Minangkabau. This proximity results in a culturally rich environment, representing the convergence of two or more cultures.

The native inhabitants of northern Mukomuko are the Minangkabau people. Traditionally, culturally, and linguistically, they are closely related to the Pesisir Selatan of West Sumatra. In the past, the Mukomuko region was part of the Pesisir Selatan diaspora of the Minangkabau. In addition to the Minangkabau, the southern part of Mukomuko regency is inhabited by the Pekal people. The Mukomuko region is also a Minangkabau diaspora (rantau) area, often referred to as the Riak nan Berdebur region, along the west coast from Padang to South Bengkulu. However, since the British colonial period, the Mukomuko region has been politically separated from West Sumatra. Since then, the Mukomuko people have been separated from their relatives in West Sumatra, which continued to the Dutch colonial period, the Japanese occupation, and into the independence era. Centuries of separation have resulted in the Mukomuko language gradually diverging from standard Minangkabau, particularly in its vocabulary. However, despite these changes, mutual intelligibility between the two dialects generally persists.

The Minangkabau language has been regarded as the lingua franca in northern Bengkulu, exerting its influence on neighboring languages like Bengkulu Malay, particularly in terms of phonology and vocabulary.

== Classification ==
Mukomuko belongs to the Malayic languages branch of the Malayo-Polynesian subgroup of the Austronesian language family, which also includes Malay and standard Indonesian. Linguistically, it shares a strong resemblance with the Minangkabau language, particularly the Pesisir Selatan dialect spoken in the neighboring Pesisir Selatan Regency. Lexically, the Mukomuko language shares approximately 86% to 90% of its vocabulary with the Pesisir Selatan dialect. Due to these linguistic similarities, some research suggests classifying Mukomuko as a dialect of Minangkabau.

== Geographical distribution and usage ==
The majority of Mukomuko speakers lives in North Mukomuko District and South Mukomuko District of the Mukomuko Regency in northern Bengkulu. The capital of North Mukomuko District is Mukomuko, while the capital of South Mukomuko District is Ipuh. North Mukomuko District comprises 39 hamlets, and South Mukomuko District comprises 30 hamlets. In addition to Mukomuko, the community in these districts also speaks Javanese and Kerinci. Javanese is primarily spoken by transmigrants from Java, whereas Kerinci is spoken in the hamlets of Sungai Ipuh, Pondok Baru, and Sungai Jarinjing in North Mukomuko District. The geographical range of Mukomuko language speakers extends from Pondok Suguh hamlet in the south to Lubuk Pinang hamlet in the north.

Mukomuko generally only functions as a social language. It is used within family and community environments in daily life in informal settings. During wedding ceremonies, public meetings, mosque sermons, and other ceremonies, the Mukomuko people tend to code-switch between Indonesian and Mukomuko. Meanwhile, in government offices, schools, and formal settings, Indonesian is used. However, in the early grades of elementary school, teachers from the Mukomuko area often use the Mukomuko language to present the material. In markets and among the general public, the Mukomuko language is used among members of the Mukomuko community, while between people from different areas, a mix of Mukomuko and Indonesian or other regional languages is used.

As of 2024, recognizing the importance of preserving local languages, the regional government of Mukomuko has initiated the inclusion of regional languages such as Rejang, Mukomuko, and Serawai in the school curriculum.

== Phonology ==
=== Vowels ===
Like other Malayic languages, there are five different vowels in Mukomuko, which are /i/, /e/, /a/, /u/, and /o/. The Mukomuko language mostly follows the standard Indonesian orthography. The table below illustrates the vowel chart of the Mukomuko language.

	Front	Central	Back
Close	i		u
Mid	e		o
Open		a	

=== Consonants ===
There are twenty consonants in Mukomuko, which are /p/, /b/, /t/, /d/, /k/, /ɡ/, /ʔ/, /t͡ɕ/, /d͡ʑ/, /ɣ/, /r/, /s/, /l/, /m/, /n/, /h/, /ŋ/, /ɲ/, /w/, and /j/. The table below illustrates the consonant chart of the Mukomuko language.

		Bilabial	Alveolar	Alveopalatal	Palatal	Velar	Glottal
Nasal		m	n	ɲ		ŋ	
Plosive/Affricate	voiceless	p	t	tɕ		k	ʔ
Plosive/Affricate	voiced	b	d	dʑ		ɡ	
Fricative			s		(ç) (Note: Allophone of /h/ in coda after /i/, /oj/, and /uj/.)	ɣ	h
Semivowel		w			j		
Lateral			l				
Trill			r				

Orthographic note: The sounds are represented orthographically by their symbols as above, except:

- /tɕ/ is written ⟨c⟩
- /ɣ/ is written ⟨gh⟩
- /dʑ/ is written ⟨j⟩
- /ŋ/ is written ⟨ng⟩
- /ɲ/ is written ⟨ny⟩
- /j/ is written ⟨y⟩

=== Diphthongs ===
In Mukomuko, two types of diphthongs are found: descending diphthongs and ascending diphthongs. The descending diphthongs include:

- /ia̯/: keriang ('dry'), petiang ('important')
- /ea̯/: loceang ('bell'), obeang ('screwdriver')
- /ua̯/: jatuang ('heart'), gunuang ('mountain')
- /oa̯/: panoloang ('helper'), tekoang ('can')

The ascending diphthongs include:

- /oj/: ploy ('door cloth'), loyh ('loose')
- /aw/: suraw ('mosque'), kebaw ('buffalo')
- /aj/: makay ('use'), ratay ('chain')
- /uj/: kabuyh ('escape'), kakuyh ('outhouse')

In addition, there seem to be sounds similar to diphthongs in some basic vocabulary. These sounds are found within a single syllable and are always followed by a consonant. The most common consonants that follow these sounds are nasal consonants, namely /ŋ/, /n/, and /m/. Examples are:

- /ie̯/: anjieng ('dog'), gajien ('salary')
- /ue̯/: minuen ('drinks'), acuen ('poison')

=== Stress ===
Stress in Mukomuko can be categorized into word stress, which includes stress in base words, reduplicated words, compound words, and affixed words, and sentence stress, which includes basic sentence stress and stress in coordinated compound sentences.

Word stress in Mukomuko is not phonemic. Phonetically, three types of stress can be distinguished: primary stress [ˈ], secondary stress [ˌ], and weak stress which is not marked. Primary stress occurs on the final syllable of the word, secondary stress on the initial syllable, and weak stress on other syllables. Primary stress in base words is placed on the final syllable, secondary stress on the initial syllable, while other syllables receive weak stress. Reduplicated words receive primary stress on the final syllable of the second word, secondary stress on the final syllable of the first word, and other syllables receive weak stress. The distribution of stress in compound words is similar to that in reduplicated words, with primary stress on the final syllable of the second word, secondary stress on the final syllable of the first word, and weak stress on the other syllables. Affixed words receive primary stress on the final syllable, secondary stress on the initial syllable, and weak stress on the other syllables. Lastly, sentence stress is the strong emphasis placed on the emphasized words in a sentence.

== Grammar ==
Along with Indonesian, Malay, and other related languages, the word order in Mukomuko is typically subject-verb-object (SVO). While there are notable exceptions, the grammar structure of the Mukomuko language shares many similarities with Indonesian and Malay.

=== Affixes ===
There are three types of affixes in Mukomuko: prefixes, suffixes, and infixes. Similar to Malay, Mukomuko words are composed of a root or a root plus derivational affixes. The root is the primary lexical unit of a word and is usually bisyllabic, of the shape CV(C)CV(C). Affixes are "glued" onto roots (which are either nouns or verbs) to alter or expand the primary meaning associated with a given root, effectively generating new words, for example, baco ('to read') may become mambaco ('reading'), mambacokan ('reading for'), dibaco ('being read'), pembaco ('reader'), bacoan ('reading material'), terbaco ('accidentally read').

==== Prefixes ====
The prefixes found in Mukomuko are N-, ba-, di-, ta-, paN-, and sa-.

The combination of the prefix N- with base words appears in various forms, such as mang-, ma-, many-, m-, and n-. These variations of the N- form are called allomorphs of the N- prefix, and their occurrence is caused by the influence of the phoneme that begins the base word.

- N- + ambiq ('take'): mangambiq ('taking')
- N- + akeq ('carry'): mangakeq ('carrying')

The attachment of the prefix ba- to base words appears in two forms, namely ba- and bagh. These variations are considered allomorphs of the ba- prefix, and the variation is caused by the influence of the phoneme that begins the base word.

- ba- + ghiang ('happy'): baghiang ('be happy')
- ba- + janjing ('promise'): bajanjing ('to promise')

The attachment of the prefix di- to base words only appears in one form, which is di-.

- di- + dendo ('fine'): didendo ('fined')
- di- + jua ('sell'): dijua ('for sale')

The attachment of the prefix ka- to base words only appears in one form, which is ka-.

- ka- + tuo ('old'): katuo ('leader')
- ka- + duo ('two'): kaduo ('second')

The attachment of the prefix ta- to base words only appears in one form, which is ta-.

- ta- + acam ('threat'): taancam ('threatened')
- ta- + dekeq ('close'): tadekeq ('closest')

The attachment of the prefix paN- appears in several forms, namely pam-, pan-, pany-, pang-, pange-, and pa-. These variations are considered allomorphs of the paN- prefix, and the variation is caused by the influence of the phoneme that begins the base word.

- paN- + beling ('buy'): pambeling ('buyer')
- paN- + dapeq ('obtain'): pandapeq ('opinion')

Lastly, the attachment of the prefix sa- to base words only appears in one form, which is sa-.

- sa- + pinggan ('plate'): sapinggan ('a plate')
- sa- + dikiq ('little'): sadikiq ('a little')

==== Suffixes ====
The suffixes present in Mukomuko are only -an and -nyo. Imperative meanings in this language are not expressed through suffixation, but rather through other means, such as the use of the particle -lah or the prefix di-. For example:

- Sambalah udang ko! ('Add sambal to this prawn!')
- Hitamlah alis mato ban! ('Blacken your eyebrows!')

The position of the suffixes -an and -nyo is located at the end of the base word. For example:

- aghing ('day') + -an: aghian ('daily')
- paneh ('hot') + -nyo: panehnyo ('it's so hot')

==== Infixes ====
In the Mukomuko language, there are three infixes, namely -ar-, -al-, and -am-. Word formation through suffixes on base words is very limited and only occurs in certain words. For example:

- -ar- + suIieng ('whistle'): sarulieng ('flute')
- -am- + geta ('shake'): gameta ('shaking')

=== Reduplication ===
There are four types of reduplication in Mukomuko, which are full reduplication, partial reduplication, reduplication combined with the process of affixation and reduplication with phoneme changes. Examples of full reduplication are:

- makan-makan ('eating out')
- malung-malung ('shy-shy')
- sesah-sesah ('wash-wash')

Examples of partial reduplication are:

- N- + caghing ('look'): macaghing-caghing ('look around')
- ba- + kupu ('gather'): bakupu-kupu ('gather together')
- ta- + senyum ('smile'): tasenyum-senyum ('smiling')

Examples of reduplication combined with the process of affixation are:

- sa- + cepeq ('fast') + -nyo: sacepeq-cepeqnyo ('as fast as possible')
- sa- + tingging ('high') + -nyo: satingging-tinggingnyo ('as high as possible')
- sa- + lueh ('wide') + -nyo: salueh-luehnyo ('as wide as possible')

Examples of reduplication with phoneme changes are:

- asa-usu ('origin')
- bulaq-baliq ('back and forth')
- kedap-kedip ('blinking')

=== Nouns ===
In Mukomuko, nouns can be identified from two perspectives: semantic and syntactic. Semantically, nouns refer to humans, animals, objects, and concepts or ideas. Words like imam ('priest'), jawing ('cow'), bining ('wife'), and pamalaih ('lazy person'), for instance, are nouns because they refer to humans, animals, objects, and concepts or ideas.

Nouns tend to occupy the functions of subject, object, or complement in a sentence. For example:

- Kaqkung malopeq ka batang aie. ('Frog jumps into the river')
- Baq mangambiq kayung. ('Dad is taking the wood')

In the example above, the words kaqkung ('frog') and kayung ('wood') are nouns, because each of these words fulfills the function of subject, object and complement.

Nouns can be preceded by the negator bukan ('not'). For example:

- Itung bukan jawing. ('That is not a cow')

In the sentence above, the word jawing ('cow') is classified as a noun.

Generally, nouns can be followed by adjectives either directly or with the intermediary word na ('that'). For example, the words sapelo ('papaya') and giging ('teeth') are nouns because they can combine to form sapelo kuning ('yellow papaya') and giging putih ('white teeth') or sapelo na kuning ('papaya that is yellow') and giging na putih ('teeth that are white').

Nouns in Mukomuko can be either base nouns or derived nouns. Base nouns can be general or specific in nature. For instance, gambar ('picture'), malam ('night'), and meja ('table') are general base nouns, while adiq ('younger sibling'), batang ('stem'), and iceq ('grain') are specific base nouns.

Lastly, in derived forms, nouns can receive the affixes ka-, pa-, -ar-, -al-, and -am-. Words such as katuo ('leader'), palupo ('forgetful person'), saruling ('flute'), gelembung ('bubble'), and kamunieng ('murraya paniculata') are examples of derived nouns that have received these affixes.

=== Adjectives ===
Adjectives can be modified by comparison markers such as kurang ('less'), lebih ('more'), and paling ('most'). Examples are kurang eloq ('less good'), lebih kumuh ('more dirty'), and paling tinggi ('the tallest'). Adjectives can also be intensified with modifiers like sangat ('very') and nian ('extremely'). Examples are sangat pandi ('very foolish') and tipih nian ('extremely thin'). Adjectives can be negated with the negator idaq ('not'), for example, idaq ghusaq ('not broken'), idaq ghaming ('not noisy'), and idalq lama ('not long'). Adjectives can be repeated with the prefix sa- and the suffix -nyo, such as samasin-masinnyo ('as salty as it gets'), sagedang-gedangnyo ('as big as it gets'), and sakughuieh-kughuiehnyo ('as sharp as it gets').

In addition, adjectives in Mukomuko can be monomorphemic or polymorphemic. Words like masin ('salty'), gedang ('big'), ghaming ('noisy'), tingging ('tall'), eloq ('beautiful'), and tipih ('thin') are examples of monomorphemic adjectives. Polymorphemic adjectives can take the form of reduplication or compound words. Words like sighah-sighah ('red-red'), malung-malung ('shy-shy'), gedang-gedang ('big-big'), putih-putih ('white-white'), ghaiin-ghaiin ('diligent-diligent'), and tingging-tingging ('tall-tall') are examples of polymorphemic adjectives. Meanwhile, adjectives in compound word forms include gedang hating ('big-hearted'), kereh kapalo ('stubborn-headed'), gedang mulut ('big-mouthed'), begheq hating ('heavy-hearted'), itam manih ('dark-sweet'), and aluih buding ('gentle-minded').

=== Adverbs ===
In Mukomuko, adverbs can also be monomorphemic or polymorphemic. Some adverbs are formed through affixation. Words like sangat ('very'), hinyo ('only'), capeq ('immediately'), jo ('just'), nian ('extremely'), talalung ('too much'), hapieng ('almost'), jaghang ('rarely'), coq ('often'), mukien ('maybe'), and teruih ('always') are examples of monomorphemic adverbs. Adverbs can also appear in reduplicated forms, such as cepeq-cepeq ('firmly'), lambeq-lambeq ('slowly'), noq-noq ('quietly'), and eloq-eloq ('carefully'). Then, words like saeloqnyo ('ideally'), sabenanyo ('actually'), besonyo ('usually'), betuqnyo ('apparently'), and ghasonyo ('feels like') are adverbs in affixed forms.

=== Pronouns ===
==== Personal pronouns ====
This table shows an overview over the most commonly and widely used pronouns of the Mukomuko language.

Person	Singular	Plural		
Person	Singular	Neutral	Exclusive	Inclusive
1st person	ambo, mbo, -mbo		kaming	kito, awaq
2nd person	aban, ban	kamung, aban kelagalo		
3rd person	inyo, nyo	ughang tung, nyo		

The first person singular pronouns are ambo, mbo, and mbo. The word ambo, meaning 'I' or 'me', is used in both formal and informal situations. In other words, the usage of ambo in speech is common. The mbo form is used to indicate possession. However, to express possession, the word ambo is more frequently used, as in jawing ambo ('my cow'), ghumah ambo ('my house'), and oto ambo ('my car'). The word mbo also substitutes for ambo, and in its usage, ambo is the one more commonly used. The first person plural pronouns are kaming, kito, and awaq, which all means 'we'. The word kaming is used in speech that refers to conversations with others on the speaker's side. Meanwhile, the words kito and awaq are used in speech that refers to both the speaker and the listener being addressed. The usage of the kito and awaq personas does not seem to indicate any difference in meaning, as both words can substitute for each other in the same context.

The second person singular pronoun is aban or ban. In context, the persona ban tends to indicate possession. However, aban is also often used to indicate possession. Additionally, at the beginning of sentences, aban frequently appears. However, in casual and less formal conversations, the position of aban at the beginning of sentences is often replaced by ban. The second person plural pronouns are kamung ('you all') and aban kelagalo ('all of you').

The third person singular pronouns are inyo ('he' or 'she') and yo ('he/she' or '-nya'). The third person plural pronouns are ughang tung and nyo, meaning 'they'. The usage of both types of third person pronouns can be interchangeable.

==== Demonstrative Pronouns ====
Demonstrative pronouns in Mukomuko can be distinguished into general demonstrative pronouns and temporal demonstrative pronouns. General demonstrative pronouns include iko ('this') and itung ('that'). Referentially, the word iko refers to a reference close to the speaker, while itung refers to a reference far from the speaker. The usage of both types of demonstrative pronouns in sentences demonstrates the following. First, both pronouns may occur at the beginning, middle, and end of sentences. Second, at the beginning, middle, and end of sentences, the word iko can take the form iko and also ko, especially in somewhat rapid speech, while the word itung always takes the form itung at the beginning of a sentence, and usually takes the form tung if appearing in the middle or at the end of a sentence. For example:

- Iko/ko unggeh ambo ('That is my bird')
- Itung/tung jawing sepo? ('Whose cow is that?')

Temporal demonstrative pronouns include siko ('here') and sinon ('there'). The word siko refers to a nearby place, while the word sinon refers to a place far from the speaker. As temporal demonstrative pronouns, the words siko and sinon often combine with directional prepositions: di ('at'), ke ('to'), and daghing ('from'), thus becoming di siko, ke siko, daghing siko, and di sinon, ke sinon, daghing sinon. Additionally, there are also the words cemiko ('like this'), betugtu ('like that'), and modeko ('like that') which can be classified as demonstrative pronouns. These three pronouns refer to the meaning of 'thing' or 'matter'. The meaning of the pronoun modeko seems to encompass the meanings of both the pronouns cemiko and betugtu.

==== Interrogative Pronouns ====
In speech, interrogative pronouns are used because the speaker wants to obtain information from the listener. The required information may concern people, things, choices, reasons, time, place, manner, tools, or companionship. Related to this, the use of various interrogative pronouns depends on what information is needed. The types of interrogative pronouns in Mukomuko are sepo ('who'), apo ('what'), mano ('which'), ngapo ('why'), pabilo ('when'), ke mana ('where to'), di mano ('where'), daghing mano ('from where'), dengan apo ('with what'), camano ('how'), and dengan sepo ('with whom').

== Dialects ==
The Mukomuko language has two dialects, which are the northern dialect and the southern dialect. The northern dialect is spoken by speakers in the city of Mukomuko and its surrounding areas bordering West Sumatra, while the southern dialect is spoken in the southern part of Mukomuko regency bordering North Bengkulu Regency. Both dialect speakers consider the northern dialect to be the prestige dialect because their ancestors originally inhabited the northern region.

The differences between the two dialects are evident in phonetics and vocabulary variations. Phonetic variations between the two dialects involve systematic sound changes. Firstly, the sound [-it] at the end of words in the northern dialect changes to [-ik]. Secondly, the sound [-ir] at the end of words in the Northern dialect changes to [gh] in the southern dialect. Thirdly, the sound [g] at the beginning of words in the northern dialect changes to [gh] in the Southern dialect. Fourthly, the sound [-ut] at the end of words in the Nnrthern dialect changes to [-uq] in the southern dialect.

Furthermore, there are notable vocabulary distinctions between the two dialects. The following table presents a sample of words that exhibit differences between them:

Northern Dialect	Southern Dialect	Indonesian	English
kulit	kulik	kulit	skin
gigit	gigik	gigit	tooth
perut	peghut	perut	stomach
utaro	utagho	utara	north
barat	baghat	barat	west
gatieng	ghatieng	ranting	twigs
gambut	ghambuq	rambut	hair
giang	ghiang	riang	carefree
lutut	lutuq	lutut	knee

The differences between the two dialects can be influenced by other languages. The southern dialect is more influenced by other languages due to community mobility and the presence of transmigrants from other regions such as Java.

== Vocabulary ==
Mukomuko vocabulary has been heavily influenced by the Minangkabau, to the extent that it is now considered a dialect of Minangkabau. It is estimated that 90% of Mukomuko's vocabulary is derived from Minangkabau, specifically the Pesisir Selatan dialect. In addition, Mukomuko has also absorbed words from standard Indonesian, the official language of Indonesia, as well as Javanese brought by transmigrants from Java. There is a slight difference in vocabulary between the Mukomuko dialect spoken in the northern part of Mukomuko Regency and that spoken in the southern part, although they remain generally mutually intelligible. The table below provides examples of common Mukomuko vocabulary used on a daily basis in both the northern and southern dialects, along with their Minangkabau, Indonesian, and English translations.

=== Numerals ===
Number	Northern Mukomuko	Southern Mukomuko	Standard Minangkabau	Indonesian	English
1	satung	suah, satung	cieʼ	satu	one
2	duo	duo	duo	dua	two
3	tigo	tigo	tigo	tiga	three
4	peq	peq	ampeʼ	empat	four
5	limo	limo	limo	lima	five
6	nam	nam	anam	enam	six
7	tujuh	tujuh	tujuah	tujuh	seven
8	lapan	lapan	lapan	delapan	eight
9	samilan	samilan	sambilan	sembilan	nine
10	sapuluh	sapuluh	sapuluah	sepuluh	ten
11	sabeleh	sabeleh	sabaleh	sebelas	eleven
15	limo beleh	limo beleh	limo baleh	lima belas	fifteen
50	limo puluh	limo puluh	limo puluah	lima puluh	fifty
100	saghatus	saghatus	saratuih	seratus	one hundred/a hundred
150	saghatus limo puluh	saghatus limo puluh	saratuih limo puluah	seratus lima puluh	one hundred and fifty
500	limo ghatus	limo ghatus	limo ratuih	lima ratus	five hundred
1000	saghibung	saghibung	saribu	seribu	thousand

=== Directions ===
Northern Mukomuko	Southern Mukomuko	Standard Minangkabau	Indonesian	English
iko	iko	iko	ini	this
itung	itung	itu	itu	that
siko	siko	siko	sini	here
sinan	sinan	sinan	sana	there
di siko	keq siko	di siko	di sini	over here
di sinan	keq sinan	di sinan	di sana	over there
salatan	salatan	salatan	selatan	south
utara	utara	utara	utara	north
barat	baghat	barat, baraik	barat	west
timu	timu	timur, timo	timur	east

=== Personal Pronouns ===
Northern Mukomuko	Southern Mukomuko	Standard Minangkabau	Indonesian	English
ambo	ambo	ambo, awak	aku, saya	I, me
aban	kaban	ang, waang, awak, kau	kamu, engkau	you (singular)
kamung	toboh	kalian	kalian	you (prural)
inyo	inyo	inyo, wakno, ano	dia	he/she
kaming, kito	kaming, awaq	awak, kami, kito	kita	we
kamung	toboh	urang-urang	mereka	they

=== Interrogatives Pronouns ===
Northern Mukomuko	Southern Mukomuko	Standard Minangkabau	Indonesian	English
apo	apo	a, apo	apa	what
sepo	siapo	sia, siapo	siapa	who
nyapo	moideq	mangapo, manga, dek a	mengapa	why
di mano	keq mano	di mano, dima	dimana	where
macam mano	campo mano	bagaimano, ba a	bagaimana	how
bilo	bilo	bilo	kapan	when

=== Nouns ===
Northern Mukomuko	Southern Mukomuko	Standard Minangkabau	Indonesian	English
ikan	ikan	ikan, lauak	ikan	fish
batang	batang	pohon	pohon	tree
anjieng	anjieng	anjiang	anjing	dog
kulit	kulik	kulik	kulit	skin
tulang	tulang	tulang	tulang	bone
iku	iku	ikua	ekor	tail
mato	mato	mato	mata	eye
bitang	bitang	bintang	bintang	star
bungo	bungo	bungo	bunga	flower
laut	laut	lauik	laut	sea
buah	buah	buah	buah	fruit
angin	angin	angin	angin	wind
pasi	kesik	pasia, kasiak	pasir	sand
batung	batung	batu	batu	stone
aie	aie	aie, aia	air	water
awan	awan	awan	awan	cloud
debung	debung, debu	debu	debu	dust
asoq	asoq	asok	asap	smoke
matoaghing	matoaghing	matoari	matahari	sun
bulan	bulan	bulan	bulan	moon
aping	aping	api	api	fire
ujan	ujan	ujan	hujan	rain
mulut	muluk	muluik, muncuang	mulut	mouth
giging	giging	gigi	gigi	tooth
daun	dauen	daun	daun	leaf

=== Verbs ===
Northern Mukomuko	Southern Mukomuko	Standard Minangkabau	Indonesian	English
minuen	minuan	minum	minum	drink
makan	makan	makan	makan	eat
tengoq	tengoq, lieq	lieq	lihat	see
ciuem	ciuem	cium, maidu	cium	kiss
denga	denga	danga, donga	dengar	hear
tidu	tidu	tidua, lakok	tidur	sleep
duduq	duduq	duduak	duduk	sit
tegaq	tegaq	tagak, badiri	berdiri	stand
bagenang	baghenang	baranang	berenang	swim
bajalan	bajalan	bajalan	berjalan	walk
ngulien	tatiduah	babariang, bagolek	berbaring	lie down
datang	datang	datang, tibo	datang	arrive
nyok	nyok	angok	napas	breathe

=== Adjectives ===
Northern Mukomuko	Southern Mukomuko	Standard Minangkabau	Indonesian	English
baghung	baghung	baru	baru	new
dingien	dingien	dingin, sajuak	dingin, sejuk	cold
gedang	gedang	gadang, godang	besar	large
panjang	panjang	panjang	panjang	long
teba	teba	taba, toba	tebal	thick
pendeq	pendeq	pendek	pendek	short
tipih	tipih	tipih	tipis	thin
keghieng	keghieng	kariang	kering	dry
penuh	penuh	panuah	penuh	full
banyak	banyak	banyak, rami	banyak	many

== Literature ==
Like the Minangkabau people, the people of Mukomuko are also renowned for their literary works, particularly their well-known oral literature. Oral literature in Mukomuko refers to a traditional form of storytelling that is passed down verbally. This type of literature is typically old, anonymous, and features a traditional style with content that is both captivating and reflective of a society that existed before the advent of writing. Mukomuko's oral literature embodies these characteristics: it is transmitted orally, is of ancient origin, lacks known authorship, and portrays the cultural products of Mukomuko society from the past. This oral tradition is expressed in both prose and poetry. Existing prose forms of Mukomuko's oral literature include folk tales such as Dendam Tajelo, Unggen Bemban, Gadih Basanai, Jodah Sarabing, and Bujang Tuo.

Below is an example of the traditional Mukomuko Gurindam, a type of irregular verse form of poetry renowned throughout the Malay world. It is presented alongside its Indonesian and English translations:

Mukomuko

Pilih-pilih tempat ban manding,
Kasatu teluq kaduo tenang

Ka duduq taman tupian,
Alung tasanda ka durian

Pilih-pilih tempat ban jading,
Kasatu Elos kadua senang

Namboa orang buruq ka kaban jangan,
lsuq manyesa kemudian

Biriq-biriq tebang ka Manan,
lnggap di kota Maleoboro

Daghing niniq sampai ka maman,

Kining turun pulo pada beliau ko
Indonesian

Pilih-pilih tempat mandi,
Kesatu teluk kedua tenang

Ka duduk taman tepian,
Alu tersandar ke durian

Pilih-pilih tempat kau jadi,
Kesatu bagus kedua senang

Namun orang buruk kepadamu jangan,
Esok menyesal kemudian

Birik-birik terbang ke Manak,
Hinggap di kota Maleoboro

Dari nenek sampai ke paman,
Kini turun pula kepada beliau ini

English

Carefully choosing a bathing place,
The first bay, the second tranquil

Sitting at the park's edge,
The pestle leans against the durian

Choose the place where you become,
The first is good, the second is happy

Yet if someone treats you poorly, don't,
Regret arrives tomorrow

The grains scatter, journeying towards Manak,
Settling in the city of Maleoboro

From grandmother to uncle,
Now it descends upon this person

Note: 'Maleoboro' refers to Fort Marlborough, a British fort in Bengkulu City.

== See also ==
- Minangkabau people
- Overseas Minangkabau
- Kerinci language
- Mukomuko Regency

== Bibliography ==
- Suwarno; Canrhas, Amril; Basuki, Rokhmat; Suhartono; Supadi (1993). Sintaksis Bahasa Muko-Muko [Syntax of the Muko-Muko language] (PDF) (in Indonesian). Jakarta: Language Development and Cultivation Center, Department of Education and Culture. ISBN 979-459-313-3.
- Rinaldi, Rio; Naini, Ineng; Isnanda, Romi (2024). "Morfosintaksis Bahasa Lokalitas Kabupaten Mukomuko Provinsi Bengkulu" [Morphosyntaxics of the local language in Mukomuko Regency in Bengkulu]. Jurnal Kata: Penelitian Tentang Ilmu Bahasa dan Sastra (in Indonesian). 8 (1). doi:10.22216/kata.v8i2.2864 (inactive 12 July 2025).
- Rahman, Fadlul; Gani, Maulid Hariri; Kurniati, Santi (2022). "Hubungan kekerabatan Pesisir Selatan Sumatera Barat dan Mukomuko Bengkulu (dalam perspektif budaya bahasa)" [The kinship relationship between Pesisir Selatan in West Sumatra and Mukomuko in Bengkulu (in the perspective of language culture).]. Basastra: Jurnal Bahasa, Sastra, Dan Pengajarannya (in Indonesian). 10 (2): 410–423. doi:10.20961/basastra.v10i2.56790. ISSN 2714-9765.
- Manan, Umar; Amir, Zainuddin; Malano, Nasroel; Syafei, Anas; Surin, Agustar (1986). Struktur Bahasa Muko-Muko [Structure of the Muko-Muko Language] (PDF) (in Indonesian). Jakarta: Language Development and Cultivation Center, Department of Education and Culture.
- Aliana, Zainul Arifin; Ratnawati, Latifah; Suhardi; Martojo, Soedjiono (1993). Fonologi dan Morfologi Bahasa Muko-Muko [Phonology and Morphology of the Muko-Muko Language] (PDF) (in Indonesian). Jakarta: Language Development and Cultivation Center, Department of Education and Culture. ISBN 979-459--304-4.
- Ajisman (2018). "Minangkabau people in Mukomuko from 1945 to 2003: Historical perspective" (PDF). Jurnal Penelitian Sejarah Dan Budaya (in Indonesian). 4 (1).
- Syamsurizal (2019). "Phonological Integration of Minangkabau Language into Bengkulu Malay". Tuah Talino: Jurnal Ilmiah Bahasa dan Sastra. 13 (1). Balai Bahasa Kalimantan Barat. doi:10.26499/tt.v13i1.1355. ISSN 0216-079X.
- Gushevinalti (2011). Visualisasi Adat Asli pada Ritual Pernikahan dan Cilok Kai dalam Komik Kebudayaan sebagai Strategi Pewarisan Budaya Bagi Generasi Muda (PDF) (Thesis). Universitas Bengkulu.
- Setiyanto, Agus (2001). Elite Pribumi Bengkulu – Perspektif Sejarah Abad ke-19 [Bengkulu's Native Elite - A 19th Century Historical Perspective] (in Indonesian). Jakarta: Balai Pustaka. ISBN 978-979-666-610-2.
