= Fatmawati Soekarno Airport =

Fatmawati Soekarno Airport Bandar Udara Fatmawati Soekarno
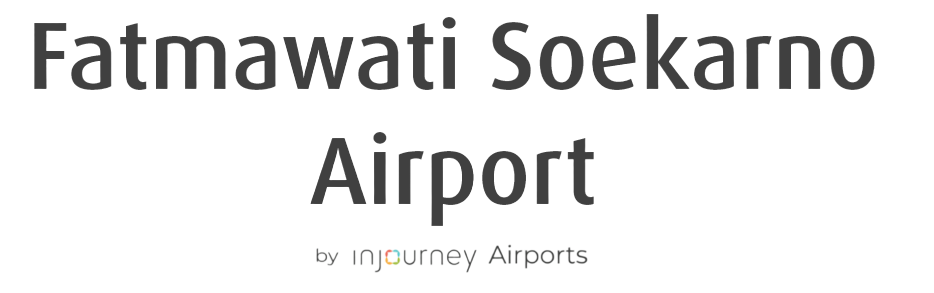

- IATA: BKS; ICAO: WIGG

Summary
- Airport type: Public
- Owner: Government of Indonesia
- Operator: InJourney Airports
- Serves: Bengkulu City, Indonesia
- Location: Pekan Sabtu, Bengkulu City, Bengkulu, Indonesia
- Time zone: WIB (UTC+07:00)
- Elevation AMSL: 50 ft (15 m)
- Coordinates: 03°51′43″S 102°20′12″E

Map
- Location of airport in Sumatra

Runways
Direction	Length		Surface
Direction	m	ft	Surface
13/31	2,250	7,382	Asphalt

Statistics (2024)
- Passengers: 598,685 (▼1.4%)
- Cargo (tonnes): 1,740 (▲4.7%)
- Aircraft movements: 4,771 (▲2.6%)
- Source: DGCA

Fatmawati Soekarno Airport (IATA: BKS, ICAO: WIGG), formerly known as Padang Kemiling Airport, is a domestic airport serving the city of Bengkulu, the provincial capital and largest city of Bengkulu Province in Sumatra, Indonesia. Located in Pekan Sabtu, Selebar District, approximately 14 km (8.7 mi) from the city center, the airport is named after Fatmawati Sukarno (1923–1980), Indonesia's former First Lady, a National Hero, and a prominent figure in the country's independence movement. She was the wife of Sukarno, Indonesia's first president, who spent part of his exile in Bengkulu. The airport serves as the primary gateway to Bengkulu City and the surrounding areas, as well as the wider province.It offers direct flights to Jakarta, the capital of Indonesia, as well as pioneer services to smaller cities and towns in Bengkulu and neighboring provinces, including Enggano, Krui, Mukomuko, and Pagar Alam, most of which are operated by Susi Air.

== History ==
=== Construction and early history ===
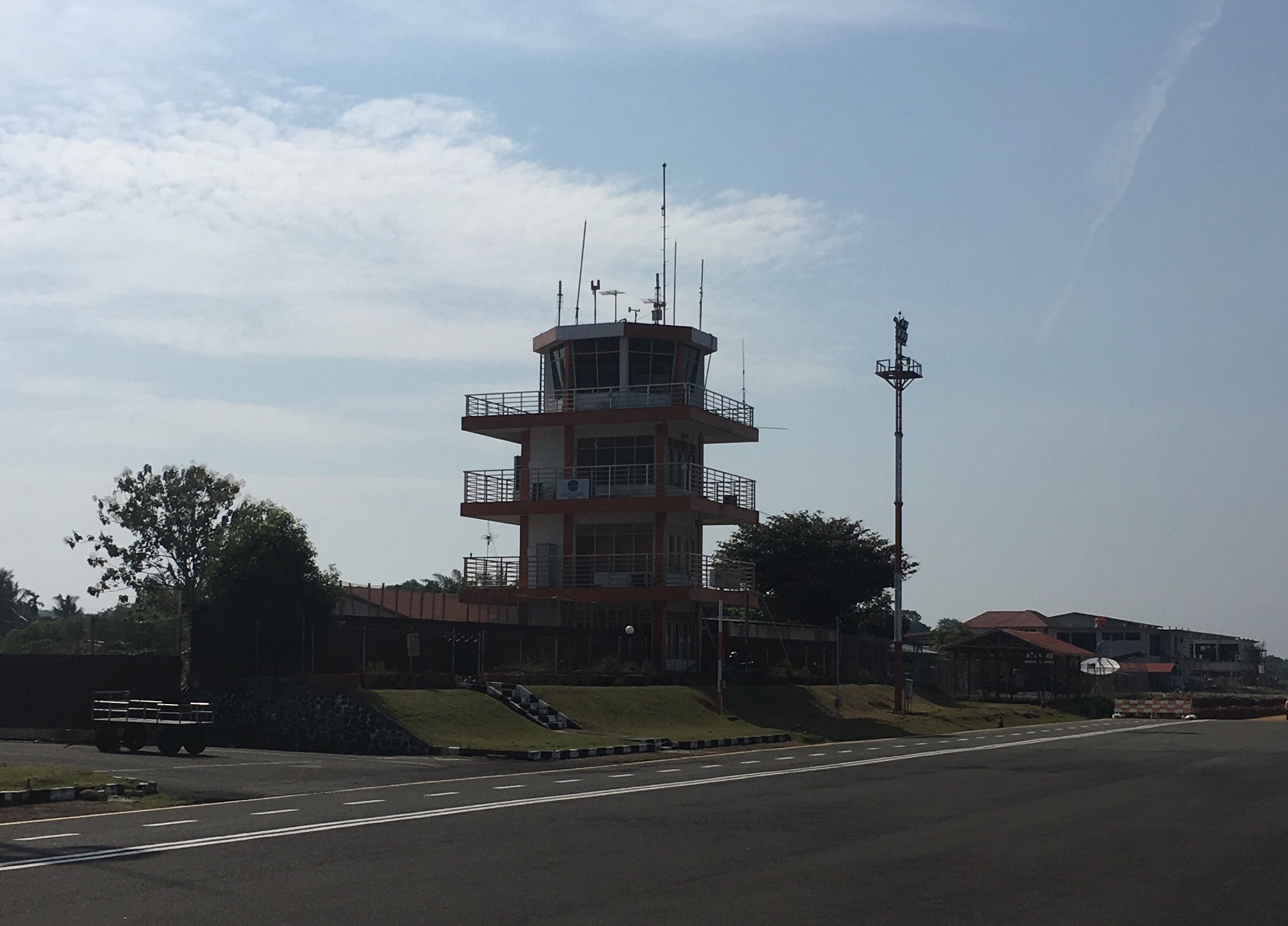
ATC tower

Fatmawati Soekarno Airport was built during the Japanese occupation around 1943–1944 as a military airstrip for the purpose of supporting Japanese air defense operations during World War II. The construction was carried out through romusha (forced labor), with an initial runway length of 1,100 meters and a width of 30 meters. Throughout the war, the airfield was guarded by Japanese military forces alongside local Heiho auxiliaries in anticipation of possible Allied attacks.

After Japan was defeated by the Allies and surrendered in 1945, the airport was taken over by the Indonesian Air Force during the Indonesian National Revolution. The Dutch captured the airfield during Operation Kraai in January 1949, along with the city. Following the Dutch withdrawal from Indonesia, the airport began operating as a civilian airport in 1950 under the name Padang Kemiling Airport. At the time, the Indonesian Air Force, which still managed the airport, handed over its management to the Civil Aviation Service, later known as the Directorate General of Civil Aviation. The airport was then capable of accommodating only Douglas DC-3 aircraft.

In 1952, development efforts included the addition of a grass-surfaced taxiway and apron, enabling the airport to handle Fokker F27 aircraft in limited capacity. In 1960, a passenger terminal and office facilities measuring 540 m² were constructed. Between 1974 and 1975, the runway was extended to 1,800 meters, allowing Fokker F27 aircraft to operate at full capacity. At the time, the airport was still designated as a pioneer airstrip and was connected to Palembang by pioneer flights operated using de Havilland Canada DHC-6 Twin Otter aircraft, operated by Merpati Nusantara Airlines. Between 1982 and 1983, the runway was overlaid, making it capable of accommodating Fokker F28 aircraft in limited capacity. This allowed Garuda Indonesia to begin serving the airport with Fokker F28 aircraft, making Bengkulu the last provincial capital in Indonesia at the time to receive service from the airline.

By the early 1990s, the airport was served by several airlines, including Garuda Indonesia, which operated direct flights to the national capital, Jakarta, and Merpati Nusantara Airlines, which operated inter-Sumatra services to Medan, Padang, and Palembang. Another overlay was completed between 1991 and 1992, allowing Fokker F28 aircraft to land at full capacity. Further development of the airport continued with the extension of the runway to 1,900 meters between 1996 and 1997.

=== Contemporary history ===
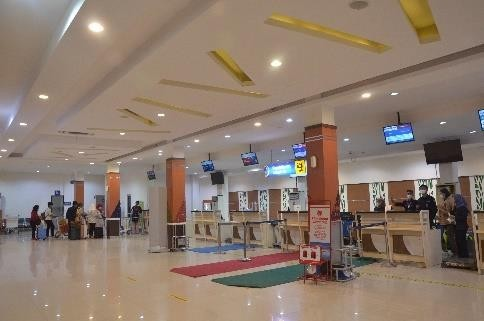
Check-in area

In 2001, the terminal building was expanded to 1,776 m², and the airport was officially renamed Fatmawati Soekarno Airport by a decree issued by the Ministry of Transportation on July 18, 2001. The renaming was proposed by the Governor and people of Bengkulu as a tribute to Fatmawati Sukarno, the former first lady of Indonesia and wife of Indonesia's first president, Soekarno, as well as a prominent figure in the country's independence movement. The airport's new name was officially inaugurated by then-President Megawati Sukarnoputri, who coincidentally was the daughter of Fatmawati, on 15 November 2001. The terminal was further expanded to 2,180 m² in 2002, while the runway was extended to 2,250 m in 2004. Expansion efforts continued in 2006, including the enlargement of the terminal to 3,324 m² and the widening of the runway from 30 to 45 meters. Since then, the runway has measured 2,250 meters by 45 meters and has been capable of handling all narrow-body aircraft type.

Since 2010, the airport's facilities have been gradually upgraded, including the installation of a Runway Visual Range (RVR) system to complement the Instrument Landing System (ILS). These systems help monitor runway conditions and support safe aircraft takeoffs and landings. The upgrades formed part of a broader plan to eventually designate the airport as an international airport. In 2018, the Bengkulu provincial government announced plans to launch international flights from Bengkulu to neighboring countries, including Singapore and Malaysia. Plans are also being considered to designate the airport as a Hajj embarkation point, which would allow direct flights to Saudi Arabia to serve pilgrims traveling for the Hajj.

In 2019, the management of the airport was transferred from the Directorate General of Civil Aviation to Angkasa Pura II, which was later rebranded as InJourney Airports. Following the transfer of management, Angkasa Pura II announced plans to invest up to Rp434 billion in the airport's development, including landside improvements such as the expansion of the passenger terminal and airside upgrades such as the expansion of the apron to accommodate additional aircraft parking stands. The airport's land area will also be expanded from 197 hectares to 265 hectares.

== Facilities and development ==
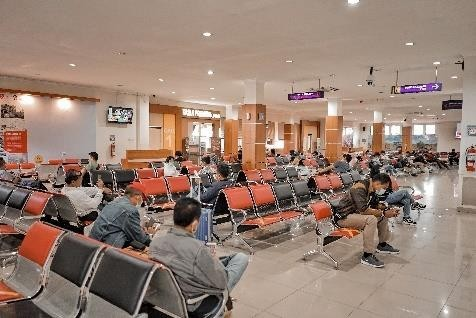
Boarding gate

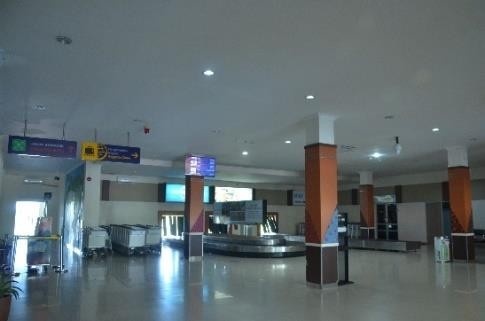
Baggage claim area

The current passenger terminal has an area of 4,470 m² and can accommodate up to 600,000 passengers annually. The terminal is equipped with basic facilities, including restaurants, lounges, ATMs, prayer rooms, souvenir shops, and toilets.

Construction of a new terminal began in 2018 under the directive of then-President Joko Widodo to address increasing passenger traffic, as the existing terminal had become overcrowded and operating beyond its capacity. The project, which is being carried out in two phases, aims to accommodate up to 5.6 million passengers and upgrade the airport to international status, enabling the launch of new international routes to Malaysia and Singapore. The total investment for the development is estimated at approximately 622.6 billion rupiah. However, construction of the new terminal has been delayed, partly due to the COVID-19 pandemic, during which funds originally allocated for the airport were redirected to pandemic response efforts. As of 2024, overall progress has reached only 40%. Due to the stalled construction, several parts of the terminal have deteriorated from a lack of maintenance. Construction resumed in September 2025, with the first phase initially targeted for completion in May 2026, at a total cost of Rp64.2 billion. The new terminal will have a floor area of 9,214 m² across two floors and will be equipped with airbridges.

The airport has a single runway measuring 2,250 m × 45 m (7,382 ft × 148 ft), capable of accommodating narrow-body aircraft such as the Boeing 737 and Airbus A320. The runway is equipped with facilities including an Instrument Landing System (ILS) and Runway Visual Range, which assist in monitoring runway conditions and enable aircraft operations at night and in reduced visibility. The runway is planned to be extended to 2,500 m (8,202 ft), with a further extension to 3,000 m (9,843 ft) ultimately planned to accommodate larger aircraft. In addition to the runway, the airport has two taxiways connecting the runway to the apron, measuring 130 m × 26 m (427 ft × 85 ft) and 132.5 m × 23 m (435 ft × 75 ft), respectively. The airport's apron measures 475 m × 80 m (1,558 ft × 262 ft).

=== New airport ===
Due to limited space for future expansion, there has been a long-term proposal to construct a new airport in Seluma Regency to eventually replace Fatmawati Soekarno Airport. The new airport is planned to be built on a 500 to 700-hectare plot of land owned by Perkebunan Nusantara VII, located in Sukaraja District. Meanwhile, the Seluma Regency Government has offered up to 1,000 hectares of land for the construction of the proposed airport. Once the new airport becomes operational, the existing airport is expected to be converted into a military airbase for either the Indonesian Air Force or the Indonesian Navy. The proposed new airport was intended to be designated as an international airport and equipped with facilities to accommodate international services. However, the plan was shelved in 2014 due to the anticipated high construction costs, with the government instead opting to maximize the expansion and development of Fatmawati Soekarno Airport.

== Airlines and destinations ==
Airlines	Destinations
Batik Air	Jakarta–Soekarno-Hatta
Citilink	Jakarta–Soekarno-Hatta
Super Air Jet	Jakarta–Soekarno-Hatta
Susi Air	Enggano, Krui, Mukomuko, Pagar Alam

== Statistics ==
A Garuda Indonesia Boeing 737-800 at Fatmawati Soekarno Airport

Annual passenger numbers and aircraft statistics
Year	Passengers handled	Passenger % change	Cargo (tonnes)	Cargo % change	Aircraft movements	Aircraft % change
2006	215,518	Steady	360	Steady	2,380	Steady
2007	414,322	▲92.2	1,498	▲316.1	3,732	▲56.8
2008	382,346	▼7.7	1,747	▲16.6	3,220	▼13.7
2009	459,403	▲20.2	2,112	▲20.9	3,580	▲11.2
2010	542,204	▲18.0	2,092	▼0.9	4,896	▲36.8
2011	574,591	▲6.0	2,632	▲25.8	5,002	▲2.2
2012	965,723	▲68.1	2,384	▼9.4	4,234	▼15.4
2013	707,248	▼26.8	2,401	▲0.7	6,514	▲53.8
2014	773,689	▲9.4	3,020	▲25.8	6,914	▲6.1
2015	815,130	▲5.4	2,827	▼6.4	7,364	▲6.5
2016	591,320	▼27.5	1,919	▼32.1	5,922	▼19.6
2017	399,642	▼32.4	1,320	▼31.2	3,689	▼37.7
2018	1,065,479	▲166.6	4,195	▲217.8	9,719	▲163.5
2019	774,372	▼27.3	3,656	▼12.8	7,997	▼17.7
2020	339,231	▼56.2	1,700	▼53.5	4,160	▼48.0
2021	322,714	▼4.9	1,235	▼27.4	3,310	▼20.4
2022	533,309	▲65.3	1,501	▲21.5	4,440	▲34.1
2023	607,361	▲13.9	1,662	▲10.7	4,651	▲4.8
2024	598,685	▼1.4	1,740	▲4.7	4,771	▲2.6
^{Source: DGCA, BPS}

== Accidents and incidents ==
- On 7 November 2018, Lion Air Flight 633, scheduled to fly from Bengkulu to Jakarta, struck a lamp post with its left wingtip while taxiing for takeoff. The impact caused damage to the wingtip, forcing the aircraft to return to the terminal. Although none of the 143 passengers and 7 crew members were injured, the incident resulted in delays for several other flights.
