= Surantih =

Coordinates: 1.4100°S 100.7700°E

Surantih is a settlement in Sutera, Pesisir Selatan district, Pesisir Selatan regency, West Sumatra province in Indonesia.

Surantih is one of 11 major nagari—out of 37—in Pesisir Selatan. The other 10 major nagaris are Tarusan, Pasarbaru, Salido, Painan, Pasar Kuok (or Batang Kapas), Kambang, Balai Selasa, Air Haji, Indrapura, and Tapan—in that order from north to south, where Surantih is situated between Batang Kapas and Kambang.

== Location and access ==
Surantih is located 116 km to the south of Padang, the capital city of the province. It is geographically closer to Singapore, and Kuala Lumpur in Malaysia, than to Jakarta (the capital city of Indonesia). It stretches along Batang Surantih (Surantih River) from the Indian Ocean 30 km inland to the Bukit Barisan region where it borders another nagari from a different district, Solok.

There is only one land transportation access to Surantih, the district main road connecting Padang with all major Nagari in the Pesisir Selatan district and continues to Bengkulu and Jambi province. It takes about 3 hours by bus/car from Padang to Surantih, and about 4–5 hours further to the south to the Bengkulu or Jambi province borders.

Pasar Surantih (lit. Surantih's market) is the main village where commercial amenities and social facilities are located, such as shops, small restaurants, wet market, and schools. Pasar Surantih is a typical small town in Indonesia with around 2,000 population.

Langgai is the most remote village in Nagari Surantih, situated in the Bukit Barisan with a different climate from the lowland and coastal part of Surantih. A road has been built to this village, but the condition is poor; it takes 3–4 hours to cover a distance of 30 km to reach Langgai from Pasar Surantih.

Surantih as a whole covers c. 690 hectares (1,700 acres).

== Demographics ==
The population of Surantih stands at 9425.

== People and language ==
The population is virtually 100% Moslem with occasionally a few non-Moslems from other provinces residing in the area temporarily, normally civil servants. While Moslems in this area are generally not as devout as others from other parts of West Sumatra, it is important not to do anything that is against Islam and traditional local values. Consuming pork or alcohol is offensive to locals, unless one consumes it secretly at their own house.

Locals speak "Pasisie" (Indonesian/Malay: "Pesisir"; English: "Coast") accent of Minangkabau language/Padangnese. The Minangkabau language is related to standard Malay spoken in Indonesia and Malaysia. But it is different in a sense that both native speakers will barely understand each other if they converse in normal way. But, it might be relatively easy for a Malay speaker to learn the Minangkabau language and vice versa. Almost all people speak and understand the standard accent of Indonesian or Malay, but many of the older generation especially those live in inland do not speak Indonesian at all. Young children, especially those who have not yet attended a school, might not speak Indonesian as well. English is very rarely spoken here. However, some high school students or one or two people may understand very basic English. English is taught in high school, but the standard is relatively poor.

Like most of the West Sumatrans/Minangkabau people, the people of Surantih traditionally leave their home and move elsewhere in the nation for a better life. For the younger generation, leaving home is a must if they want to continue studying at university level (or senior high school until very recently). People from Surantih could be found in many big towns and cities across the island of Sumatra, and in major cities in Java island.

Generally, West Sumatrans/Minangkabau people considered Pesisir Selatan district a backward area, due to a lag in economic development, education level, and other measures. Some of them also consider people from Pesisir Selatan district to be less acculturated and less devout in practicing Islam. This perception has reduced somewhat in recent years with economic development, and in particular improved population mobility as well as improving communication and information exchanges. However, the education standard here remains among the lowest in the province.

== Amenities and social infrastructure ==
The commercial center of Surantih, Pasar Surantih, is situated about 1 km from the coastline, and it was about 30 km from the most remote village, namely Langgai, in Bukit Barisan region. It actually lies along/parallel to the coastline.

With the economic progression, and helped by government spending, some modern facilities have been built in Surantih. It had access to electricity in the early 1980s. In the late 1980s, the residents for the first time received television broadcasts. Telecommunication service, a fixed line phone infrastructure, was extended to this small town in early 2000. With rapidly expanding cellular communication investment and technology, one now could enjoy some coverage of cellular phone service.

Education facilities have also improved. Since the establishment of the first junior high school in late 70s/early 80s, the government has built another junior school in the inland area. A senior high school was also built in early 2000 which allows locals to finish the first 12 years of basic education without leaving their village for the district's capital.

There is one health clinic with one doctor/general practitioner and several nurses. There are 10-15 mosques and surau (small mosque/chapel) across Surantih. The two biggest ones are in Pasar Surantih. A football field which hosts other sports and social activities, such as concerts or movies, is situated 200m-300m from Pasar Surantih market. Two or three small restaurants can be found in Pasar Surantih that serve Padang cuisine. Small stalls selling food or traditional cakes can be found in or around the wet market. Two local “cafés” are other places to get traditional cakes (e.g. onde-onde, lapek bugih, lemang, etc.), drinks (coconut drink is a must here). These local cafes/warungs are open till midnight, located in the main street, just the opposite of the wet market.

There is no hotel or hostel, but there is a local shop owner who allows people to stay at the second storey of his house for two thousand Rupiah (e.g. US$1 or 2). Visitors with no relatives or acquaintances normally sleep in or near the mosque, although non-Moslems are not allowed to enter the mosque.

== Economy ==
This small town is known for its traditional fishing industry. It also has a long beach which serves a tourist destination for people within the Nagari. The main river, Batang Surantih (Surantih river), originates in the Bukit Barisan region and ends in the Indian Ocean—the mouth of the river is situated approximately 1 km from Pasar Surantih. Surantih is largely arable land, and so most of the population rely on agriculture, in addition to fishing.

Surantih is typical of small towns in Indonesia in terms of economic development. To put local income in perspective, the residents' annual per capita income than the national average, about US$2,000, for 3 reasons. First, rural income is lower than urban. Secondly, West Sumatra Province GDP per capita is lower than national average. Lastly, Pesisr Selatan District GDP per capita is lower than the Province average.

According to official data from the Pesisir Selatan district website, about 39.7% of the district population is considered below the official poverty line. Surantih, by and large, resembles the average of the district's physical appearance, it is quite fair to assume that a similar proportion of local population live below the national poverty line. However, it is said that most of the local officials tend to mark up the number of poor families in order to get special subsidy from central government.

Picture: Surantih's mouth of river, about 1 km from Pasar Surantih
