= Putri Hijau =

District in Bengkulu, Indonesia

- District
- Interactive map of Putri Hijau
- Coordinates: 3°14′37.625″S 101°38′10.8773″E
- Country: Indonesia
- Province: Bengkulu
- Regency: North Bengkulu

Area
  - Total: 188.50 km^{2} (72.78 sq mi)

Population (2020)
  - Total: 23,659
  - Density: 125.51/km^{2} (325.07/sq mi)
- Time zone: UTC+07:00 (WIB)
- Postal code: 38326

Putri Hijau is an administrative district (kecamatan) in North Bengkulu Regency, Bengkulu Province, Indonesia.
