= Enggano Airport =

Enggano Airport Bandara Enggano
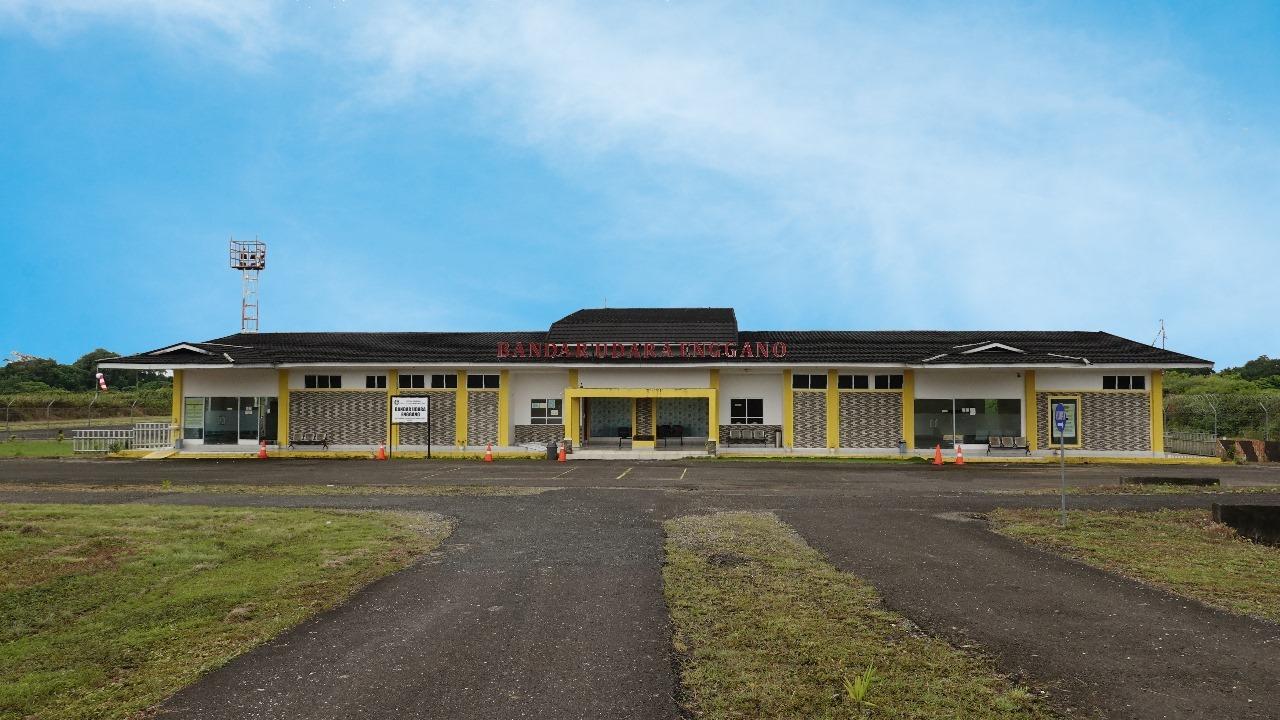
- IATA: ENG; ICAO: WIGE

Summary
- Operator: Ministry of Transport
- Serves: Enggano
- Location: Banjar Sari, Enggano, North Bengkulu, Bengkulu, Indonesia
- Coordinates: 05°18′19.3″S 102°11′20.6″E
- Interactive map of Enggano Airport

Runways
Direction	Length		Surface
Direction	m	ft	Surface
12/30	1,600	5,249	Asphalt

Enggano Airport (IATA: ENG, ICAO: WIGE) is an airport located on Enggano Island, North Bengkulu Regency, Bengkulu, Indonesia.

== History ==
Enggano Airport construction commenced in 2009. The airport was inaugurated in 2014.

== Facility ==
Enggano Airport has a runway measuring 1,600 x 30 meters, a taxiway of 110 x 23 meters, and an apron area of 100 x 80 meters. In addition, it has a terminal building covering 404 square meters.

== Airlines and destinations ==
Airlines	Destinations
Susi Air	Bengkulu
