= Napal Putih =

- District
- Interactive map of Napal Putih
- Coordinates: 3°11′32.7156″S 101°52′8.8212″E
- Country: Indonesia
- Province: Bengkulu
- Regency: North Bengkulu
- District seat: Napal Putih

Area
  - Total: 700.63 km^{2} (270.51 sq mi)

Population (2020)
  - Total: 8,527
  - Density: 12.17/km^{2} (31.52/sq mi)
- Time zone: UTC+7 (IWT)
- Postal code: 38363

Napal Putih is an administrative district (kecamatan) in North Bengkulu Regency, Bengkulu Province, Indonesia.

== Geography ==
Napal putih consists of 10 villages (desa), namely:

- Napal Putih
- Tanjung Alai
- Jabi
- Air Tenang
- Teluk Anggung
- Tanjung Kemenyan
- Muara Santan
- Lebong Tandai
- Gembung Raya
- Kinal Jaya
