= Mukomuko Airport =

Mukomuko Airport Bandar Udara Mukomuko
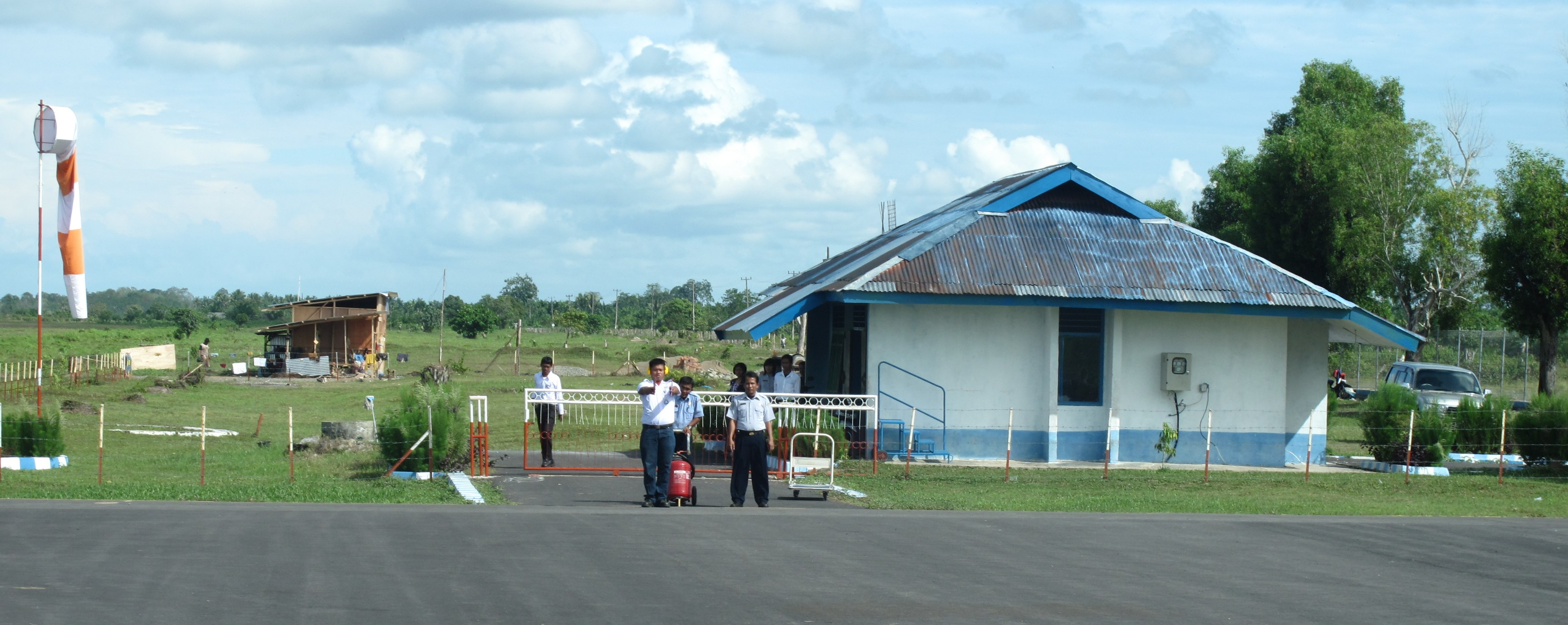
- IATA: MPC; ICAO: WIGM

Summary
- Airport type: Public
- Owner: Government of Indonesia
- Operator: Directorate General of Civil Aviation
- Serves: Mukomuko
- Location: Mukomuko Utara, Kota Mukomuko, Muko Muko, Bengkulu 38714, Indonesia
- Time zone: WIB (UTC+07:00)
- Elevation AMSL: 8.1 m (27 ft)
- Coordinates: 2°33′00″S 101°6′00″E

Map
- Location in Indonesia

Runways
Direction	Length		Surface
Direction	m	ft	Surface
14/32	1,400	4,593	Asphalt
- Source: Directorate General of Civil Aviation

Mukomuko Airport (Indonesian: Bandar Udara Mukomuko) (IATA: MPC, ICAO: WIGM) an airport serving the town of Mukomuko in Bengkulu, Indonesia. It is located 5 kilometres (3.1 mi) southeast of the Mukomuko city center. The airport currently serves only regional flights to Bengkulu, the capital of Bengkulu Province, and Padang, the capital of West Sumatra. These routes are operated by Susi Air and Wings Air.

== History ==
Mukomuko Airport was constructed in 1970, originally intended solely for military use. The airport was constructed to serve as a defense for northern Bengkulu and the southern part of West Sumatra. The airport was initially named Putri Daeng Maleini Airport, after a local politician from Mukomuko. The first flight occurred in 1976, when a CASA C-212 aircraft carrying 16 passengers became the first to land at the airport. In the 1980s, the central government designated Mukomuko Airport as an entry point for transmigrants. During that period, transmigrants from Java were flown to Mukomuko aboard C-130 Hercules aircraft operated by the Indonesian Air Force.

The airport remained inactive for several years, with no flights operating, causing the runway area to become overgrown with wild grass and shrubs. Its facilities, including the runway, gradually deteriorated. Between 2004 and 2013, the airport underwent renovations, which included repairing cracks in the runway. In 2009, it briefly served as a departure point for Hajj pilgrims, with flights operated using a Fokker 50 aircraft. Commercial flights resumed in 2010, with Susi Air launching services to Bengkulu and Padang using the Cessna 208 Caravan. In 2016, the first ATR-72 landed at Mukomuko, as Wings Air introduced a route connecting Mukomuko and Bengkulu.

== Facilities and development ==
The airport was built on an area of 1,208,000 square meters. It is equipped with telecommunications facilities (HF SSB, portable VHF), navigation facilities (NDW), a runway measuring 1,400 x 30 meters, a taxiway of 65 x 23 meters, and an apron of 60 x 40 meters.

Due to its proximity to a national road, the airport cannot be expanded further. However, the local government plans to relocate the road to free up additional land for airport expansion. There are also plans to expand the apron to accommodate more aircraft. A new larger terminal is also planned.

== Airlines and destinations ==
Airlines	Destinations
Susi Air	Bengkulu, Padang
