= Lebong Tandai =

- Village
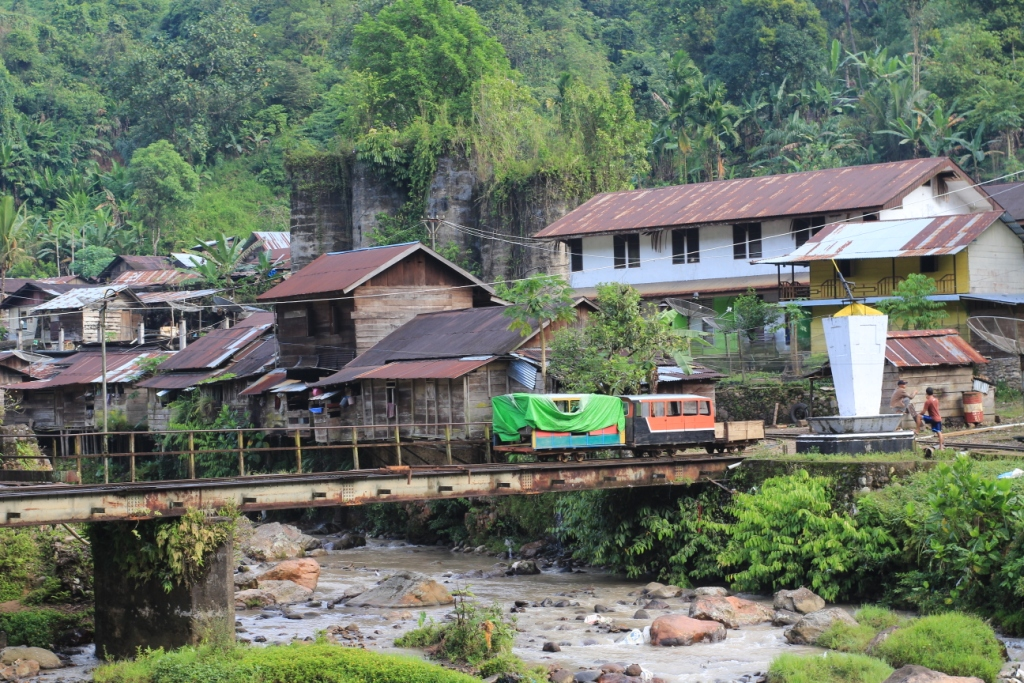
- In 2019
- Interactive map of Lebong Tandai
- Coordinates: 3°1′43″S 101°55′52″E
- Country: Indonesia
- Province: Bengkulu
- Regency: North Bengkulu
- District: Napal Putih
- Time zone: UTC+7 (Western Indonesia Time)
- Area code: +62 737

Lebong Tandai is one of the villages in the district of Napal Putih, North Bengkulu Regency, Bengkulu province, Indonesia.

The village is known as a gold mining area since the Dutch colonial era in 1910. After Indonesia became independent in 1945, gold mines and relics of the Dutch building was taken over by the Lebong Tandai people.

== Transportation ==
This remote village is connected to the outside world with the Motor Lori Ekspress (Molek) railway, between Lebong Tandai and the village of Air Tenang, also in Napal Putih, via a 35-kilometre (22 mi) former gold mining railway route through Sumatran jungle. The railway line was built by the Dutch colonial in the 1900s. Since the 1980s the railway is operated with motored draisines operated by local residents.

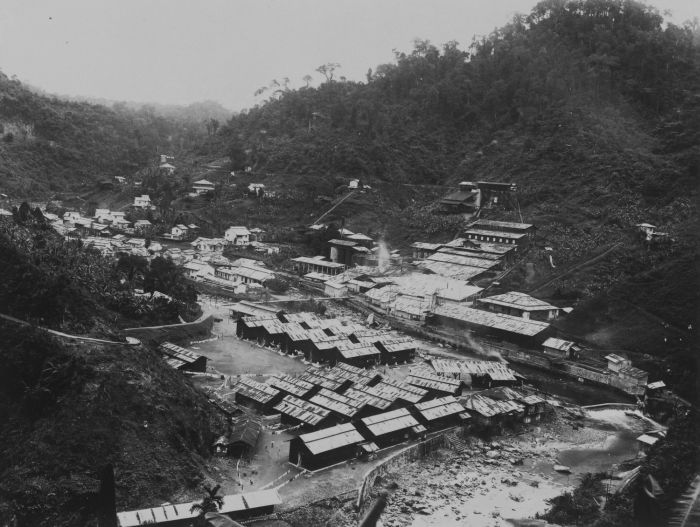
Between 1900 and 1940

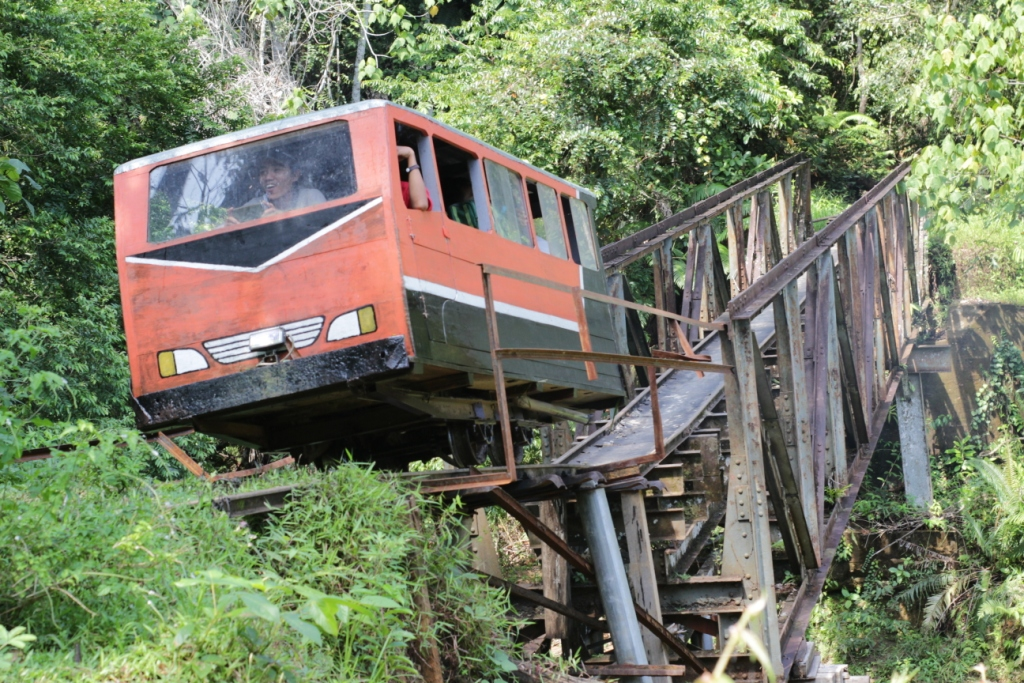
A "molek" crosses a bridge, January 2019
