= Air Napal =

- District
- Interactive map of Air Napal
- Coordinates: 3°35′53.2961″S 102°8′32.6404″E
- Country: Indonesia
- Province: Bengkulu
- Regency: North Bengkulu
- District seat: Pasar Tebat

Area
  - Total: 156.00 km^{2} (60.23 sq mi)

Population (2010)
  - Total: 11,523
  - Density: 73.865/km^{2} (191.31/sq mi)
- Time zone: UTC+7 (IWT)
- Postal code: 38373

Air Napal is an administrative district (kecamatan) in North Bengkulu Regency, Bengkulu Province, Indonesia.

== Geography ==
Air Napal consists of 12 villages (desa), namely:

- Pasar Bembah
- Tepi Laut
- Pasar Kerkap
- Air Napal (village)
- Talang Kering
- Selubuk
- Pasar Tebat
- Lubuk Tanjung
- Pukur
- Pasar Palik
- Tebing Kandang
- Talang Jarang

=== Climate ===
Climate data for Air Napal (Meteorology, Climatology, and Geophysical Agency)
Month	Jan	Feb	Mar	Apr	May	Jun	Jul	Aug	Sep	Oct	Nov	Dec	Year
Mean daily maximum °C (°F)	30.5 (86.9)	30.6 (87.1)	30.8 (87.4)	30.7 (87.3)	30.4 (86.7)	30.0 (86.0)	29.8 (85.6)	30.2 (86.4)	30.6 (87.1)	31.0 (87.8)	30.8 (87.4)	30.6 (87.1)	30.5 (86.9)
Mean daily minimum °C (°F)	23.0 (73.4)	23.1 (73.6)	23.3 (73.9)	23.4 (74.1)	23.3 (73.9)	23.1 (73.6)	22.9 (73.2)	22.9 (73.2)	23.0 (73.4)	23.2 (73.8)	23.3 (73.9)	23.2 (73.8)	23.1 (73.6)
Average precipitation mm (inches)	300 (11.8)	280 (11.0)	320 (12.6)	310 (12.2)	290 (11.4)	270 (10.6)	260 (10.2)	250 (9.8)	270 (10.6)	290 (11.4)	310 (12.2)	320 (12.6)	3,470 (136.4)
Source: BMKG (Note: This forecast may change as weather conditions change)
