= Mukomuko people =

Mukomuko
Ughang Mukomuko
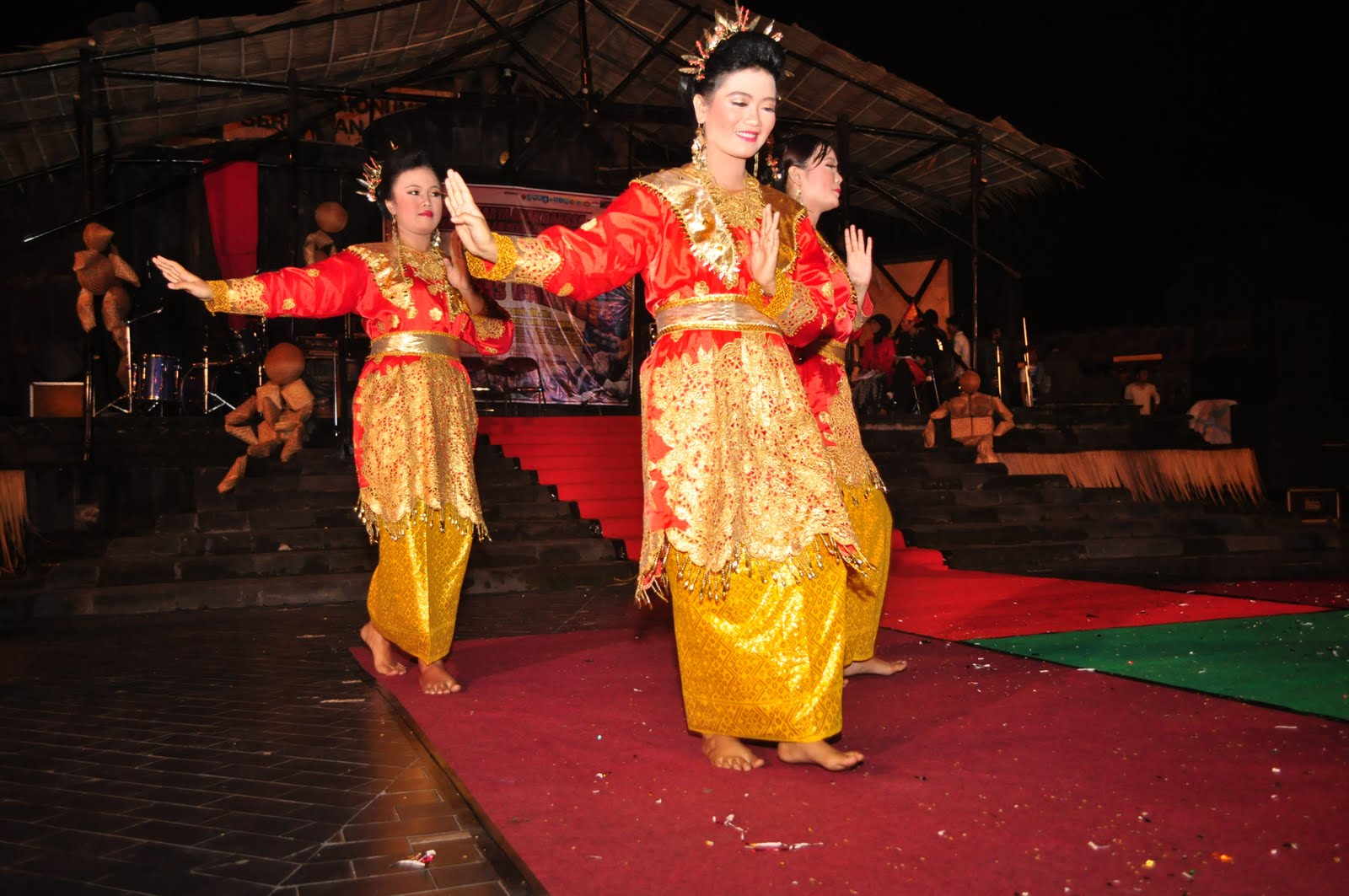
- Gandai, a Mukomuko traditional dance.

Total population
- 43,750

Regions with significant populations
- Mukomuko Regency

Languages
- Mukomuko

Religion
- Islam

Related ethnic groups
- Minangkabau, Rejang, Pekal

The Mukomuko people are an ethnic group inhabiting Mukomuko Regency, Bengkulu, which borders West Sumatra to the north. The Mukomuko people speak the Mukomuko, which has strong influences from the Minangkabau. In addition to language, many elements of Mukomuko culture are also heavily influenced by Minangkabau culture. In their kinship system, they follow a matrilineal system, similar to that observed in the land of Minangkabau.

The Mukomuko region is part of the Minangkabau migratory area (rantau) or, in the Tambo Minangkabau (chronicles), referred to as ombak nan badabua, an area along the west coast from Padang to southern part of Bengkulu. This region once belonged to the Kingdom of Inderapura, which was based in the present-day Pesisir Selatan Regency. Since the British colonial period, Mukomuko has been administratively separated as part of Bengkulu, a status that has continued after Indonesia’s independence.

== History ==
Historically, Mukomuko has been part of the Minangkabau cultural sphere, as evidenced by the many cultural similarities shared between the two. The Mukomuko people uphold customs that are not much different from those of the Minangkabau. Mukomuko customary law is rooted in Minangkabau traditions, which follow the philosophy of adat basandi syarak, syarak basandi Kitabullah ("custom rests on sharia, and sharia rests on Qur’an"). In Minangkabau's tambo (chronicles), Mukomuko is mentioned as part of the Minangkabau migratory area (rantau). A delegation from the Pagaruyung Kingdom was believed to have traveled to the Mukomuko region in the 15th century. This arrival is thought to have had a significant influence on the lives of the Mukomuko people, particularly in terms of customs and culture.

In the Mukomuko region, there used to be the Kingdom of Anak Sungai, which is estimated to have been established in the 16th century and centered in Sungai Selagan. Its territory stretched from the northern part of the Manjuto River to Air Urai in the south. Its rulers were described as "descendants of the kings of Pariaman". The kingdom was under the authority of the Inderapura Kingdom, whose representative resided in Manjuto and held the title Raja Adil.

== Population ==
Currently, the Mukomuko region is part of Bengkulu Province, bordering two other provinces: Jambi and West Sumatra. The indigenous population of Mukomuko region consists of two ethnic groups: the Mukomuko and the Pekal. The establishment of Mukomuko as a regency after Indonesia’s independence has led to an increasingly diverse population in the area.

The exact number of Mukomuko people is not known, but it is estimated to be around 60,000. In the late 1990s, the population in their native areas was approximately 39,000 in North Mukomuko district and about 31,000 in South Mukomuko district. Most Mukomuko people earn their livelihood through farming, fishing, and trading, with some working primarily as merchants. In agriculture, similar to the people of North Bengkulu in general, they cultivate both wet rice fields and dryland farms. In plantations, they grow coconut, rubber, coffee, and cloves.

The Mukomuko people are generally Muslim. However, elements of their traditional indigenous beliefs can still be seen in their daily lives. Their arts display a strong Minangkabau influence.

== Customs and traditions ==
The customary laws practiced in Mukomuko are derived from Minangkabau traditions, expressed through sayings and proverbs. The Mukomuko people uphold the philosophy of adat basandi syarak, syarak basandi Kitabullah ("custom is founded upon Islamic law, and Islamic law is founded upon the Qur’an").

The Mukomuko people recognize a type of kinship unit called a kaum. There are six kaum in Mukomuko: Kaum Berenam di Hulu, Kaum Delapan di Tengah, Kaum Empat Belas, Kaum Berenam di Hilir, Kaum Lima Suku, and Kaum Gersik. Each kaum is led by a head of the kaum, who is responsible for overseeing the implementation of customary rituals at the family level, such as weddings, circumcisions, and the sunat rasul (Apostle circumcision) ceremony.

The Mukomuko kinship system is traced through the maternal line, known as matrilineal. After marriage, the husband relinquishes membership in his own kinship group and joins his wife’s kinship, a practice called semenda (from the Minangkabau term sumando). This system gives daughters a more privileged position, as they become the heirs of their mother's lineage.

In marriage, the Mukomuko people adhere to an exogamous system, similar to that practiced in Minangkabau customs. The marrying parties must belong to different clans or lineages. Although such a marriage is religiously valid, if this rule is violated, the individuals involved may face social sanctions, including ostracism or exclusion from community life.

The Mukomuko people once had a traditional governance system called marga, led by a pasirah, who was assisted by an official known as the depati mangku. The pasirah’s role was to maintain order and harmony according to customary law, including collecting taxes. In Mukomuko, there is a tax in the form of labor called padi katulungan, which requires the people to work for three days a year for the pasirah's needs. This labor obligation could be substituted with a monetary payment. Other types of taxes were related to marriage, divorce, reconciliation, and eloping with a girl. These were known locally as uang nikah (marriage money), uang cerai (divorce money), tungkat tua (reconciliation), and ayam kelik or uang lalang (eloping with a girl).

== Language ==
In daily life, the Mukomuko people use at least two languages: Mukomuko and Pekal, along with Indonesian as the official language. This linguistic situation has existed for a long time and has naturally influenced the Mukomuko language, both in terms of its grammar and its usage.

In a study by Umar Manan and colleagues as part of the Indonesian and Regional Language and Literature Research Project in West Sumatra, published by the Department of Education and Culture in 1983, it was estimated that there were around 25,000 native speakers of the Mukomuko language.

The Mukomuko language is still closely related to the Minangkabau language, so linguists continue to classify it as one of the dialects of Minangkabau. In 2008, linguists merged their language code with Minangkabau. This language shares similarities with the Pancuang Soal dialect (spoken in the southern part of Pesisir Selatan Regency, West Sumatra) and has a distribution area to the north of Mukomuko Regency.

== Bibliographies ==
- Devi Marlina (2017). "Larangan Menikah Satu Kaum dalam Masyarakat Suku Pekal Ditinjau dari Perspektif Islam (Studi Kasus di Kecamatan Malin Deman Kabupaten Mukomuko)". Manthiq. 2 (2). Institun Agama Islam Negeri Bengkulu.
- Melalatoa, M. Junus (1995). Ensiklopedi Suku Bangsa di Indonesia Jilid L-Z. Direktorat Jenderal Kebudayaan.
- Umar Manan; Zainuddin Amir; Nasroel Malano; Anas Syafei; Agustar Surin (1986). Struktur Bahasa Mukomuko (PDF). Departemen Pendidikan dan Kebudayaan.
- Rismadona (2017). "Proses Adat Perkawinan Masyarakat di Kabupaten Mukomuko Propinsi Bengkulu" (PDF). Jurnal Penelitian Sejarah Dan Budaya. 3 (1). Departemen Pendidikan dan Kebudayaan.
- Eni Irma Yunita (2014). Pelaksanaan Perkawinan Bujang Dengan Janda Berdasarkan Hukum Adat Mukomuko di Kecamatan Kota Mukomuko, Kabupaten Mukomuko (PDF) (Thesis). Universitas Bengkulu.
- Gushevinalti (2011). Visualisasi Adat Asli pada Ritual Pernikahan dan Cilok Kai dalam Komik Kebudayaan sebagai Strategi Pewarisan Budaya Bagi Generasi Muda (PDF) (Thesis). Universitas Bengkulu.
- "Sejarah Pembentukan Kabupaten Mukomuko". Pemerintah Kabupaten Mukomuko. 8 July 2009. Archived from the original on 2019-04-22.
