= Atung Bungsu Airport =

Atung Bungsu Airport Bandar Udara Atung Bungsu
- IATA: PXA; ICAO: WIPY

Summary
- Airport type: Public
- Serves: Pagar Alam
- Location: Pagar Alam, South Sumatra, Indonesia
- Time zone: WIB (UTC+07:00)
- Coordinates: 04°01′21″S 103°22′45″E

Map
- Location within Sumatra Location within Indonesia

Runways
| Direction | Length | | Surface |
| Direction | m | ft | Surface |
|---|---|---|---|
| 06/24 | 1,350 | 4,429 | Asphalt |

Atung Bungsu Airport (Indonesian: Bandar Udara Atung Bungsu) is an airport serving Pagar Alam, South Sumatra, Indonesia.

== Airlines and destinations ==
| Airlines | Destinations |
|---|---|
| Susi Air | Bengkulu, Palembang |

== Statistics ==
Frequency of flights at Atung Bungsu Airport
| Rank | Destinations | Frequency (weekly) | Airline(s) |
|---|---|---|---|
| 1 | Palembang, South Sumatra | 2 | Wings Air, Susi Air |
| 2 | Bengkulu, South Sumatra | 2 | Susi Air |
