= Arga Makmur =

- Location in Bengkulu and Indonesia Arga Makmur (Indonesia)
- Coordinates: 3°26′16.3″S 103°11′43.06″E
- Country: Indonesia
- Province: Bengkulu
- Regency: North Bengkulu Regency
- District: Arga Makmur District
- Elevation: 531 ft (162 m)

Population (mid 2022 estimate)
  - Total: 43,263
- Time zone: UTC+7 (Indonesia Western Standard Time)

Arga Makmur (Indonesian pronunciation: [ˌarɡa ˈmaʔmʊr]) is a town, district and the administrative centre of North Bengkulu Regency in Bengkulu province, Indonesia. Its population was officially estimated at 43,263 in mid 2022.

== Climate ==
Arga Makmur has a tropical rainforest climate (Af) with heavy to very heavy rainfall year-round.

Climate data for Arga Makmur
Month	Jan	Feb	Mar	Apr	May	Jun	Jul	Aug	Sep	Oct	Nov	Dec	Year
Mean daily maximum °C (°F)	30.5 (86.9)	31.0 (87.8)	31.0 (87.8)	31.2 (88.2)	31.2 (88.2)	31.1 (88.0)	30.9 (87.6)	30.9 (87.6)	30.6 (87.1)	30.4 (86.7)	30.3 (86.5)	30.2 (86.4)	30.8 (87.4)
Daily mean °C (°F)	25.9 (78.6)	26.2 (79.2)	26.2 (79.2)	26.5 (79.7)	26.4 (79.5)	26.1 (79.0)	25.8 (78.4)	25.9 (78.6)	25.8 (78.4)	25.9 (78.6)	25.8 (78.4)	25.8 (78.4)	26.0 (78.8)
Mean daily minimum °C (°F)	21.3 (70.3)	21.4 (70.5)	21.4 (70.5)	21.8 (71.2)	21.7 (71.1)	21.1 (70.0)	20.7 (69.3)	20.9 (69.6)	21.1 (70.0)	21.4 (70.5)	21.4 (70.5)	21.4 (70.5)	21.3 (70.3)
Average precipitation mm (inches)	321 (12.6)	274 (10.8)	302 (11.9)	294 (11.6)	224 (8.8)	164 (6.5)	153 (6.0)	191 (7.5)	237 (9.3)	337 (13.3)	367 (14.4)	352 (13.9)	3,216 (126.6)
Source: Climate-Data.org
