= Painan =

Coordinates: 1°21′4″S 100°34′32″E

- town
- Interactive map of Painan
- Country: Indonesia
- Province: West Sumatra
- Regency: South Pesisir

Government
  - Camat: -

Population (2010 Census)
  - Total: 14,425
- Time zone: UTC+7 (WIB)

Painan is a coastal town that serves as the capital of the South Pesisir regency of West Sumatra, Indonesia. It is an urban centre (kelurahan) in IV Jurai District.

== History ==
There is no certain historical document or archive that holds the origin of the town's name. According to the local folklore, the name 'Painan' originated from paik nian, which means "very bitter" in Bahasa Minangkabau, the language of the Minangkabau people who live in the area. The phrase paik nian itself might refer to how difficult the life of the town's local people was in the past. It might also reflect the fact that the town's topography (surrounded by hills and rivers) caused this place to be difficult to traverse by travelers.

This coastal town became an important place during Indonesia's colonial period in 1663 when the Dutch, via the Dutch East India Company, set a trading post in Pulau Cingkuak (Cingkuak Island), one of many islands that are located offshore the town, as documented in the "Perjanjian Painan" or 'Painan Treaty'. Through the treaty, the local chiefs of the West Coast of Sumatra were also bound to supply pepper and gold to the Dutch.

== Economy ==
Nowadays, as the capital of the South Pesisir regency, this town is the center of economic activities in the regency. According to the regency's website, this town's main economic activities lie in farming, fishery, and tourism.

== Education ==
Painan has 4 Kindergartens and 2 Play Groups. It also has 9 Primary schools, 2 Junior High schools, 1 Senior High school, 1 Public High school and 1 University.

== Administration ==
Painan is divided into 3 administrative villages or kelurahan :

1. East Painan
2. Painan
3. South Painan

== Climate ==
Painan has a tropical rainforest climate (Af) with heavy to very heavy rainfall year-round.

Climate data for Painan
Month	Jan	Feb	Mar	Apr	May	Jun	Jul	Aug	Sep	Oct	Nov	Dec	Year
Mean daily maximum °C (°F)	29.9 (85.8)	30.4 (86.7)	30.3 (86.5)	30.6 (87.1)	30.8 (87.4)	30.5 (86.9)	30.2 (86.4)	30.3 (86.5)	29.7 (85.5)	29.6 (85.3)	29.6 (85.3)	29.5 (85.1)	30.1 (86.2)
Daily mean °C (°F)	25.8 (78.4)	26.0 (78.8)	25.9 (78.6)	26.3 (79.3)	26.4 (79.5)	25.9 (78.6)	25.7 (78.3)	25.8 (78.4)	25.6 (78.1)	25.6 (78.1)	25.6 (78.1)	25.6 (78.1)	25.9 (78.5)
Mean daily minimum °C (°F)	21.7 (71.1)	21.6 (70.9)	21.6 (70.9)	22.1 (71.8)	22.0 (71.6)	21.4 (70.5)	21.3 (70.3)	21.3 (70.3)	21.6 (70.9)	21.7 (71.1)	21.7 (71.1)	21.7 (71.1)	21.6 (71.0)
Average rainfall mm (inches)	322 (12.7)	234 (9.2)	268 (10.6)	276 (10.9)	192 (7.6)	174 (6.9)	154 (6.1)	191 (7.5)	249 (9.8)	331 (13.0)	370 (14.6)	353 (13.9)	3,114 (122.8)
Source: Climate-Data.org

== Tourism ==
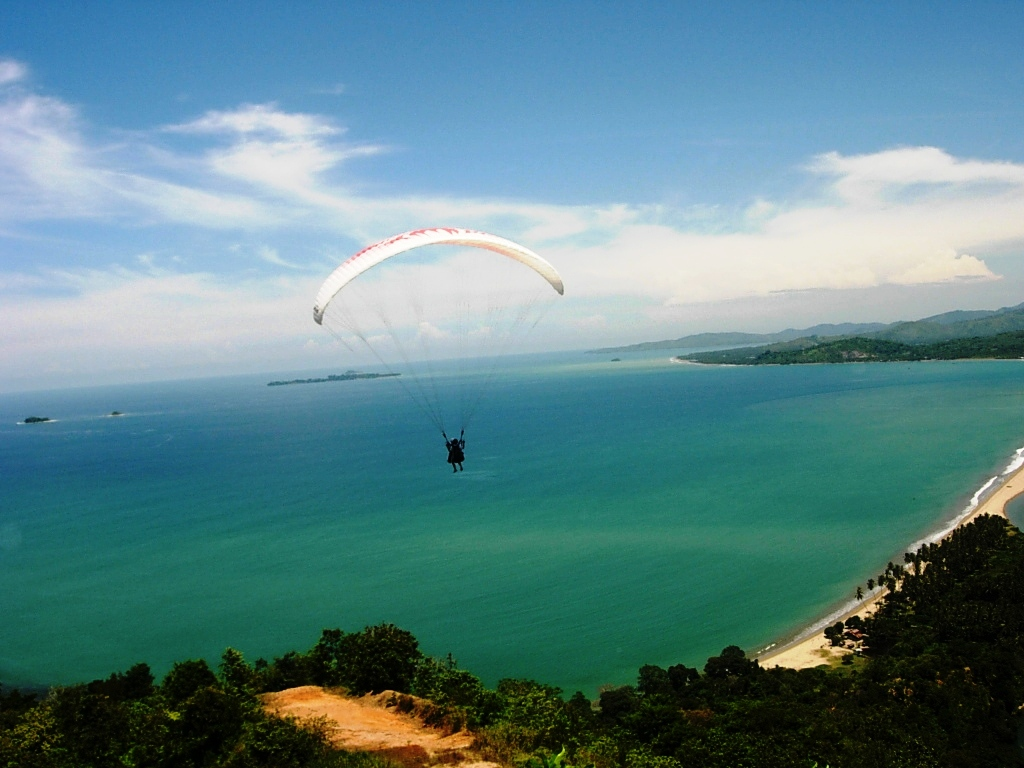
Paragliding from Painan's Langkisau Hill

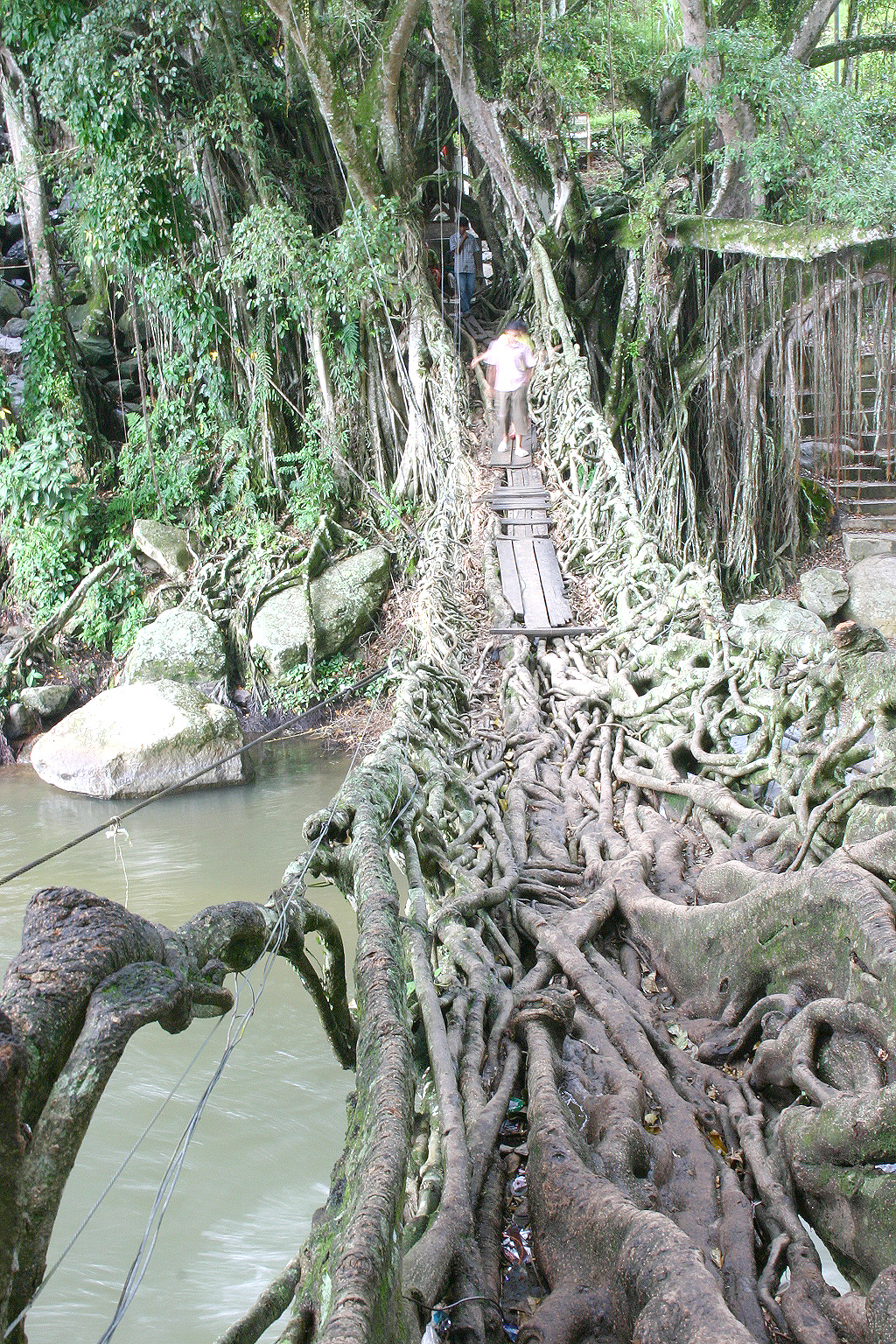
Jembatan akar, a tourist attraction near Painan

These are several tourist attractions in Painan :

1. Paragliding from the town's Langkisau Hill
2. Panorama of the Kabung Bay Hills .
3. Taratak River in Lundang
4. Mandeh Tourism Area
5. Batu Kalang Beach and the Gulf Coast Sikulo
6. Jembatan akar or "Tree-Root Bridge", a bridge that forms from the fabric of the root from two trees that grow across and extends over a stream
7. Bayang Sani Waterfalls (also known as Welkum, a former Dutch era bathhouse)
8. Lumpo Waterfall
9. Langkisau Hill (sights and paragliding)
10. Carocok Beach
11. Timbulun Waterfall
12. Salido Kecil (a famous gold mine during the era of Dutch East Indies)
13. Nipah River shore
14. Cingkuk Island (Site of the ruin of a Portuguese-Dutch fort)
15. Kerabak Island
16. Turtle Island
17. Teluk Kasai Beach
