= Linggo Mountain =

Mountain in Sumatra, Indonesia

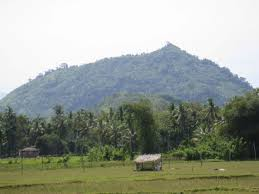

Geography
- Location: West Sumatra, Indonesia

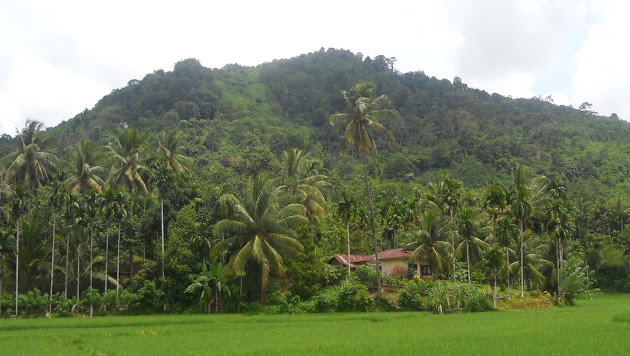
Peri Dani Putra

Linggo Mountain (also known as Gunung Linggo) is located at Koto Merapak, in the Linggo Sari Baganti sub-district in Sumatra, Indonesia.

To the west of Linggo Mountain is Koto Merapak, to the south is Koto Langang, to the north is Lagan, and to the east is Akad village.

== Tourist attractions ==
The Tapaan Stone, a large rock that presents large footprints, is in Akad Village. The stone is a popular tourist attraction.

There is also a big rock in Lagan, Joliang Stone, which is bigger than the Tapaan stone. Joliang stone is above the hill around Linggo Mountain. It is famous because of the slope it resides on - if it were to fall down, it would destroy the houses and other buildings at the bottom of the hill. For this reason, it is not a tourist destination.

There is a waterfall above Linggo Mountain, however it is inaccessible to tourists because it is far from the village and difficult to reach.
