= Pesisir Selatan Regency =

Regency in West Sumatra, Indonesia

Pesisir Selatan Regency Kabupaten Pesisir Selatan
- Regency
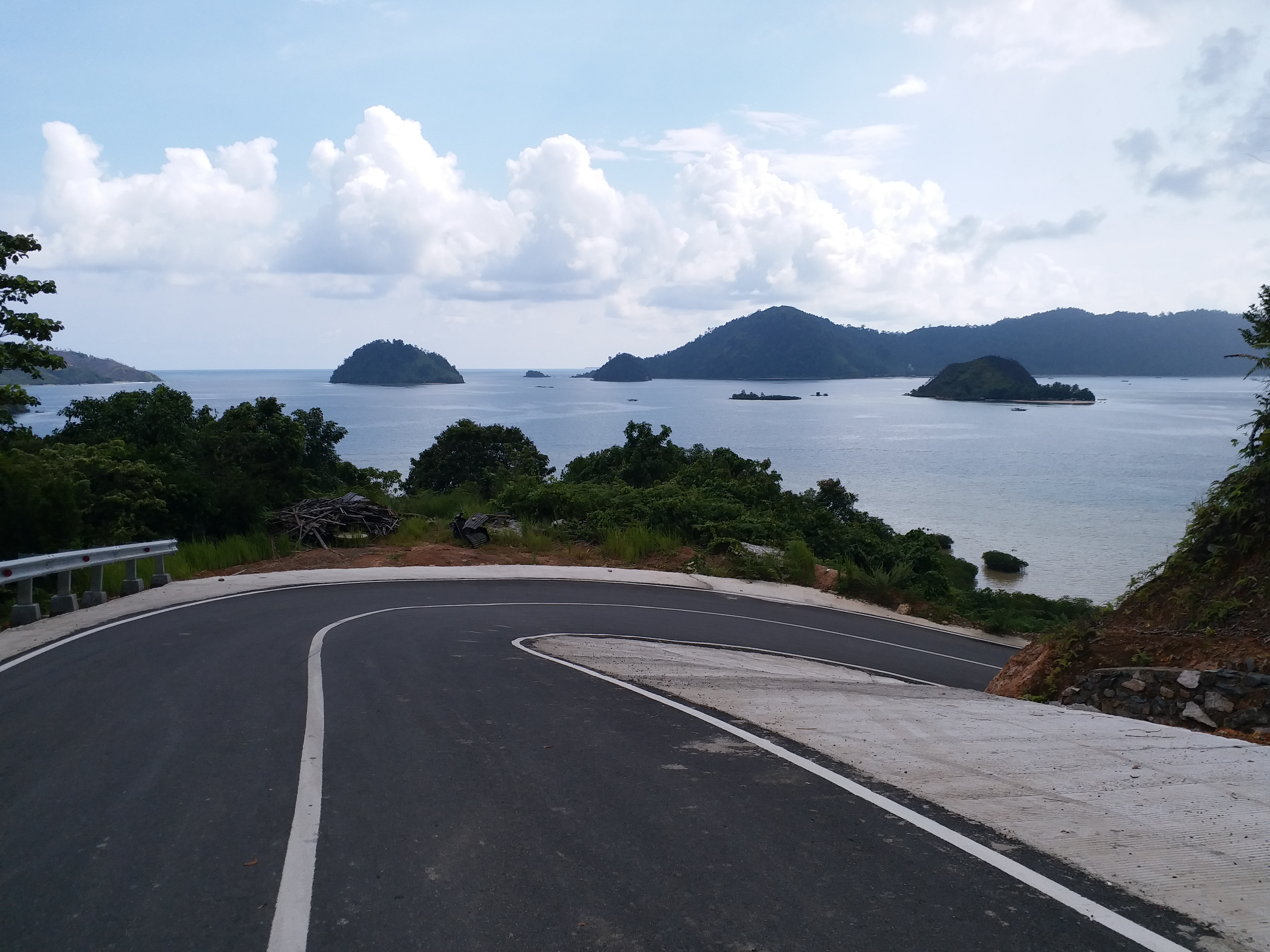
- Coast side road in Mandeh

- Coat of arms

- Location within West Sumatra

- Location in Sumatra and Indonesia Pesisir Selatan Regency (Indonesia)
- Coordinates: 1.35°S 100.567°E
- Country: Indonesia
- Province: West Sumatra
- Regency seat: Painan

Government
  - Regent: Hendrajoni
  - Vice Regent: Risnaldi Ibrahim

Area
  - Total: 6,049.33 km^{2} (2,335.66 sq mi)

Population (mid 2025 estimate)
  - Total: 543,340
  - Density: 89.818/km^{2} (232.63/sq mi)
- Time zone: UTC+7 (IWST)
- Area code: (+62) 751/756/757
- Website: pesisirselatankab.go.id

Pesisir Selatan Regency (Indonesian: Kabupaten Pesisir Selatan, Minangkabau: Kabupaten Pasisia Salatan, literally South Coast Regency) is a regency (kabupaten) of West Sumatra Province of Indonesia. It has an area of 6,049.33 km^{2} and a population of 429,246 at the 2010 Census and 504,418 at the 2020 Census; the official estimate as of mid 2025 was 543,340 (comprising 272,639 males and 270,701 females). The regency seat is at the town of Painan, in IV Jurai District.

Pesisir Selatan is located on the coast of West Sumatra and is bordered on the north by the city of Padang, in the east by the regencies of Solok Regency, South Solok Regency, and Kerinci Regency (in the province of Jambi) and in the south by Mukomuko Regency (Bengkulu province).

Pesisir Selatan is known for its traditional music, the Rabab Pesisir. The music includes the playing of a rebab (a stringed instrument), accompanied by one or more musicians singing.

== Administrative districts ==
As of 2010, the South Pesisir Regency consisted of twelve districts (kecamatan), but subsequently, three additional districts have been created in the south by the splitting of each of the three existing districts in that sector. All these are tabulated below (listed from south to north, and grouped for convenience into three non-administrative sectors) with their areas and populations at the 2010 Census, and the 2020 Census, together with the official estimates as of mid 2025. The table also includes the locations of the district administrative centres, the number of administrative villages (all 182 classed as nagari) in each district, and their postal codes.

Name of District (kecamatan)	Area in km^{2}	Pop'n Census 2010	Pop'n Census 2020	Pop'n Estimate mid 2025	Admin centre	No. of villages (nagari)	Post codes
Silaut ^{(a)}	466.45	12,109	15,592	16,411	Silaut	10	25675
Lunang ^{(a)}	456.73	18,341	22,423	23,942	Lunang	10	25674
Basa Ampek Balai Tapan	187.46	^{(b)}	15,487	17,160	Tapan	10	25672
Ranah Ampek Hulu Tapan	281.96	^{(b)}	15,499	16,698	Pasar Beriang	10	25670
Pancung Soal	547.41	^{(c)}	26,570	28,841	Inderapura	10	25671
Airpura	380.10	^{(c)}	18,180	20,954	Tamuan	10	25673
Totals for southern sector	2,320.11	93,194	113,751	124,006		60	
Linggo Sari Baganti ^{(d)}	557.66	42,319	49,169	53,527	Air Haji	16	25668
Ranah Pesisir	562.44	30,089	33,760	35,800	Balai Selasa	10	25666
Lengayang	632.96	51,623	60,994	64,688	Kambang	9	25663
Sutera ^{(e)}	569.81	46,019	56,091	61,755	Surantih	12	25662
Batang Kapas ^{(f)}	277.54	30,829	36,422	38,542	Pasar Kuok	9	25661
Totals for central sector	2,600.41	200,879	236,436	254,312		56	
IV Jurai ^{(g)}	368.19	43,302	50,894	54,397	Salido	20	25651
Bayang ^{(h)}	80.92	36,697	42,181	45,385	Pasar Baru	17	25652
IV Nagari Bayang Utara	242.33	7,276	8,286	8,653	Asam Kumbang	6	25653
Koto XI Tarusan ^{(j)}	437.37	47,898	52,870	56,257	Nanggalo	23	25654
Totals for northern sector	1,128.81	135,173	154,231	164,692		66	
Totals Regency	6,049.33	429,246	504,418	543,340	Painan	182	

Notes: (a) The former Lunang Silaut District had a population of 30,450 at the 2010 Census before its division into separate Lunang and Silaut districts.
(b) The Basa Ampek Balai Tapan District had a population of 25,742 at the 2010 Census before the splitting off of a separate Ranah Ampek Hulu Tapan district.
(c) The Pancung Soal District had a population of 37,002 at the 2010 Census before the splitting off of a separate Aipura district.
(d) including two small offshore islands. (e) including five small offshore islands. (f) including one small offshore island - Pulau Batunago. (g) including eight small offshore islands, the largest being Pulau Aua Gadang (65 ha). (h) including seven small offshore islands, the largest being Pulau Babi (52 ha). (j) including 25 small offshore islands, the largest being Pulau Cubadak (720 ha) and Pulau Marak (207 ha).

The longest rivers in the regency are Batang Silaut (200 km long), Batang Tapan (175 km), Batang Inderapura (174.4 km), Batang Surantih (171 km), Batang Bayang (134 km), Batang Lunang (133.3 km), Batang Betung (115 bm) and Batang Tarusan (90 km).

== Siamang rehabilitation ==
Marak Island is 7.37 kilometres from Nagari Sungai Pinang land which 500 hectares area has used as Siamang (Symphalangus syndactylus) and Owa ungko (Hylobates agilis) rehabilitation center complete with quarantine, medical, social and rehabilitation cages since 2003. The plan is to release some Siamang which have could use upper room with sufficient activities, not depend on human anymore and match with his/her spouse to Bukit Tiga Puluh National Park. The island is now home for 30 butterfly species and 50 kinds of birds, and is suitable for a conservation area.

== See also ==
- Linggo Mountain
- Surantih
