= Pagar Alam =

City in South Sumatra, Indonesia

- City
- City of Pagar Alam; Kota Pagar Alam

Other transcription(s)
  - Jawi: ڤاݢر عالم
  - Ulu script: ꤶꤱꥑꥆꤾꤸ꥓
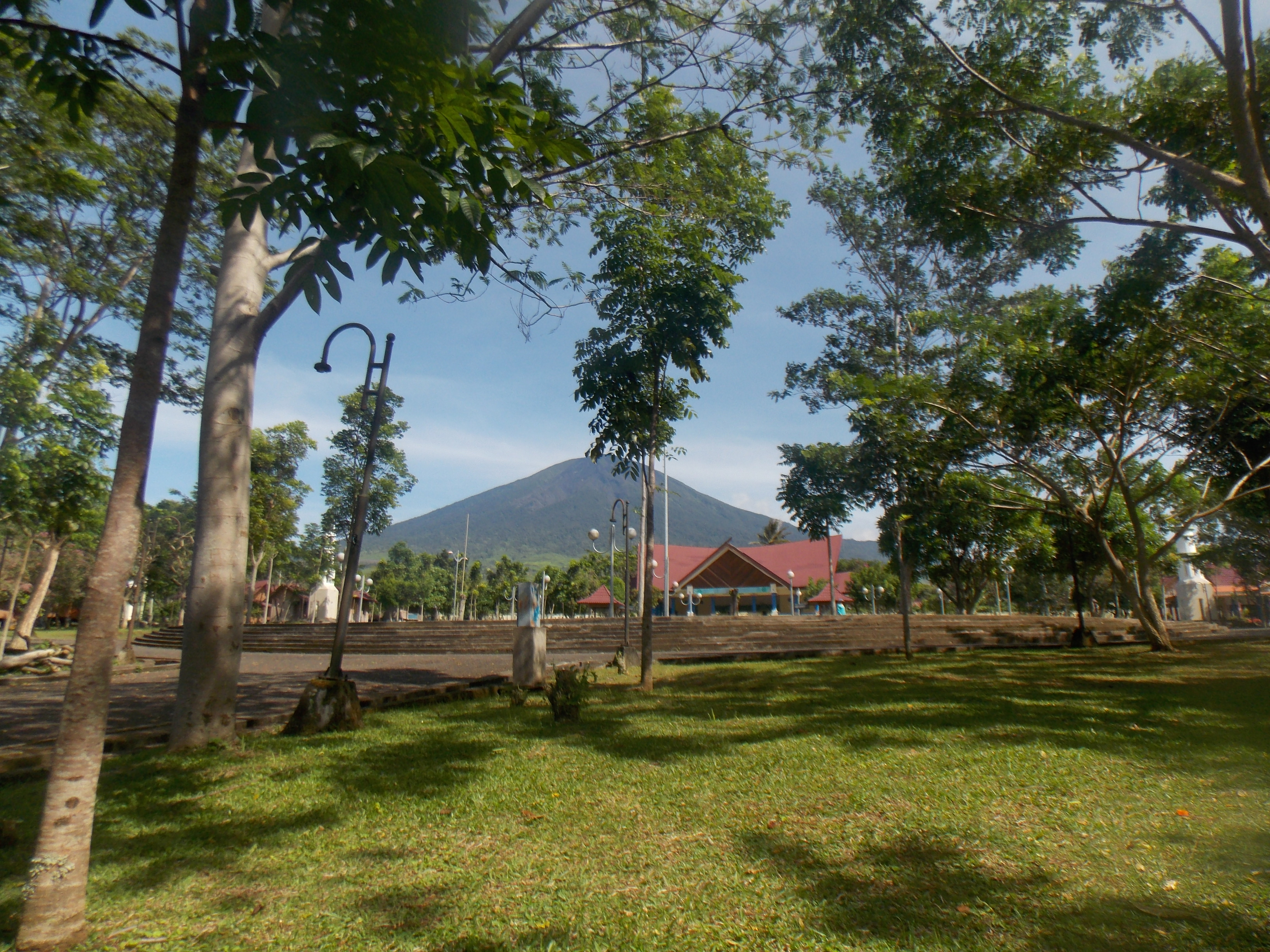
- Pagar Alam city park

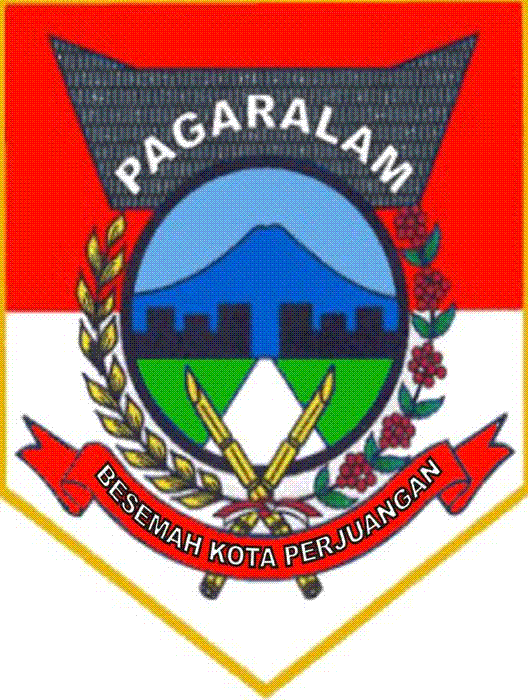
- Coat of arms
- Nickname: "Besemah"
- Motto: Besemah Kota Perjuangan (Besemah, The City of Struggle)
- Location within South Sumatra

- Location in Sumatra and Indonesia Pagar Alam (Indonesia)
- Coordinates: 4°1′0″S 103°15′0″E
- Country: Indonesia
- Province: South Sumatra

Government
  - Mayor: Ludi Oliansyah
  - Vice Mayor: Bertha Edhar

Area
  - Total: 625.91 km^{2} (241.67 sq mi)

Population (mid 2025 estimate)
  - Total: 155,255
  - Density: 248.05/km^{2} (642.44/sq mi)
- Time zone: UTC+7 (Indonesia Western Time)
- Postal code: 31500
- Area code: (+62) 730
- Website: pagaralamkota.go.id

Pagar Alam (sometimes written as Pagaralam, Jawi: ڤاݢر عالم); Ulu script: ꤶꤱꥑꥆꤾꤸ꥓), is a city in South Sumatra, Indonesia. It was formerly part of Lahat Regency, from which it was separated as an independent city on 21 June 2001; before being established as an independent city, Pagar Alam was an administrative city within Lahat Regency. It has an area of 625.91 km^{2} and a population of 126,181 at the 2010 Census and 143,844 at the 2020 Census; the official estimate as at mid 2025 was 155,255 (comprising 79,359 males and 75,896 females).

Pagar Alam is located by the Bukit Barisan Mountains, at the foot of Mount Dempo (Gunung Dempo), a volcano and the highest mountain in South Sumatra, which towers to a height of 3,159m to the west of the town. It is 298 km southwest from the province's capital city of Palembang and 60 km southwest of the town of Lahat. The city is bounded by Bengkulu Province to the south, Jarai District to the north, Kota Agung District to the east and Tanjung Sakti Pumi District to the west. Pagar Alam is one of the main suppliers of vegetables in Palembang. Its location in the highland makes the city slightly cooler than many of the other South Sumatra cities; this, together with its astounding landscape, makes the city one of the main tourist destinations in South Sumatra and it is often visited by local tourists, especially from Palembang. Currently, the city is led by Alpian Maskoni as the mayor of the city.

== Geography ==
Pagar Alam is located by the Bukit Barisan Mountains, at the feet of Mount Dempo. It is situated on the Pasemah Plateau, an extensive fertile highland plain which is surrounded by mountains. It is notable for ancient stone megaliths which surround the town on all sides and are the remnants of a Bronze Age culture. Much of the soil in the city consists of latosol and andisol with rugged and hilly topography. The soil in this city is classified as soil with high fertility (class I).

== Demography ==
In 2000, Pagar Alam's population was only 112,025 and it increased to 126,181 ten years later, and 143,844 after a further decade. One of the factors in the population increase has been the settlement of migrants who want to live in this city. Beside the city's native inhabitants, the Malay (Besemah), the city population also consists of several other groups, such as the Javanese, Minang, Batak, Chinese, Arabs, and Indians.

== Administrative districts ==
Pagar Alam is administratively divided into five districts (kecamatan), tabulated below with their areas and their populations at the 2010 and 2020 Censuses, together with the official estimates as at mid 2025. The table also includes the locations of the district administrative centres, the number of administrative villages (all classed as urban kelurahan) in each district, and its postal codes.

Kode Wilayah	Name of District (kecamatan)	Area in km^{2}	Pop'n Census 2010	Pop'n Census 2020	Pop'n Estimate mid 2025	Density per km^{2} (2025)	Admin centre	No. of villages	Post codes
16.72.04	Dempo Selatan (South Dempo)	252.36	11,611	12,783	14,111	55.92	Lubuk Buntak	5	31521
16.72.05	Dempo Tengah (Central Dempo)	180.72	12,663	14,749	16,321	90.31	Pelang Kenidai	5	31520
16.72.03	Dempo Utara (North Dempo)	102.33	19,934	23,031	24,404	238.48	Bumi Agung	7	31510
16.72.02	Pagar Alam Selatan (South Pagar Alam)	48.93	44,755	52,242	52,533	1,073.64	Ulu Rurah	8	31522: 31529
16.72.01	Pagar Alam Utara (North Pagar Alam)	42.47	37,218	42,920	47,886	1,127.53	Selibar	10	31511: 31519^{(a)}
	Totals	625.91	126,181	143,844	155,255	248.05		35	

Note: (a) excluding the kelurahan of Sukorejo, which has a post code of 31551.

== Climate ==
Pagar Alam has an elevation moderated tropical rainforest climate (Af) with heavy rainfall year-round.

Climate data for Pagar Alam
Month	Jan	Feb	Mar	Apr	May	Jun	Jul	Aug	Sep	Oct	Nov	Dec	Year
Mean daily maximum °C (°F)	27.3 (81.1)	27.8 (82.0)	28.1 (82.6)	28.3 (82.9)	28.3 (82.9)	28.0 (82.4)	27.8 (82.0)	27.9 (82.2)	27.9 (82.2)	28.0 (82.4)	27.6 (81.7)	27.3 (81.1)	27.9 (82.1)
Daily mean °C (°F)	22.6 (72.7)	22.9 (73.2)	23.2 (73.8)	23.4 (74.1)	23.4 (74.1)	23.0 (73.4)	22.6 (72.7)	22.8 (73.0)	22.9 (73.2)	23.1 (73.6)	22.9 (73.2)	22.7 (72.9)	23.0 (73.3)
Mean daily minimum °C (°F)	18.0 (64.4)	18.1 (64.6)	18.3 (64.9)	18.6 (65.5)	18.6 (65.5)	18.0 (64.4)	17.5 (63.5)	17.7 (63.9)	17.9 (64.2)	18.2 (64.8)	18.3 (64.9)	18.0 (64.4)	18.1 (64.6)
Average precipitation mm (inches)	321 (12.6)	257 (10.1)	284 (11.2)	284 (11.2)	229 (9.0)	142 (5.6)	126 (5.0)	151 (5.9)	177 (7.0)	255 (10.0)	286 (11.3)	313 (12.3)	2,825 (111.2)
Source: Climate-Data.org

== Transportation ==
=== Atung Bungsu Airport ===
Atung Bungsu Airport is the only airport in Pagar Alam. It is opened on 28 February 2013. With air transport it now is less than one hour from Palembang, instead of eight hours using land transportation.

== Education ==
=== Colleges ===
1. Sekolah Tinggi Ilmu Tarbiyah (STIT)
2. Sekolah Tinggi Keguruan & Ilmu Pendidikan (STKIP) Muhammadiyah Pagar Alam
3. Sekolah Tinggi Ilmu Ekonomi (STIE) Lembah Dempo Pagar Alam
4. Sekolah Tinggi Teknologi Pagaralam (STTP) Simpang Mbacang

== Tourism ==
Beside its landscapes, the city also offer heritage tourism with a lot of megalithic sites. The Pagaralam government will build an integrated tourism area in a 26 hectare bamboo forest at Curup Jahe in North Pagaralam.
