= Mukomuko Regency =

Regency in Bengkulu, Indonesia

Mukomuko Regency Kabupaten Mukomuko
- Regency
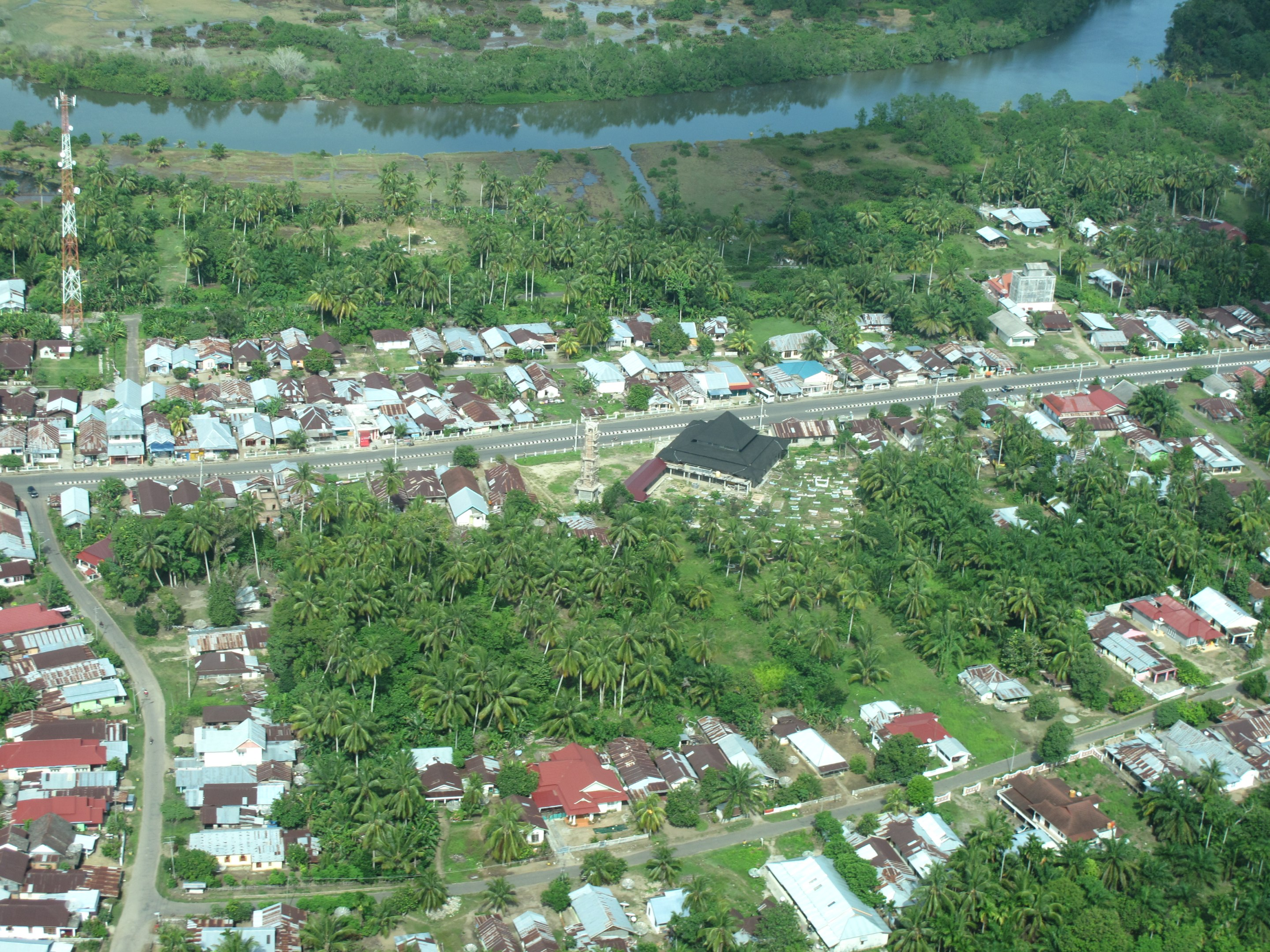
- Mukomuko town, the seat of Mukomuko regency. There is a university in the area called the University of Mukomuko, shortened to UNIM.

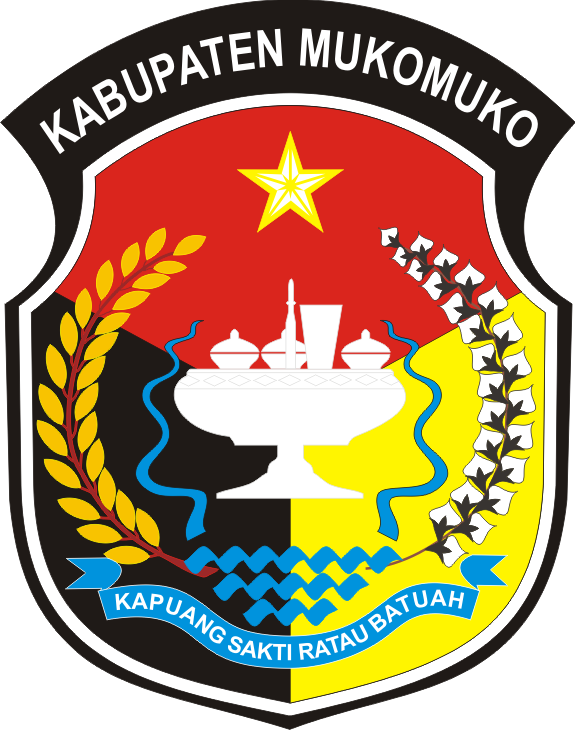
- Coat of arms
- Motto: Kapuang Sakti Ratau Batuah (Magical in His Own Area and Lucky for Other Areas)
- Coordinates: 2.66°S 101.44°E
- Country: Indonesia
- Province: Bengkulu
- Regency seat: Mukomuko

Government
  - Regent: Choirul Huda
  - Vice Regent: Rahmadi

Area
  - Total: 4,138.66 km^{2} (1,597.95 sq mi)

Population (mid 2025 estimate)
  - Total: 204,560
  - Density: 49.427/km^{2} (128.01/sq mi)
- Time zone: UTC+7 (WIB)

Mukomuko Regency (Indonesian: Kabupaten Mukomuko; pronounced [kabuˌpat̪ɛn mukoˈmuko]) is a regency of Bengkulu Province, Indonesia, on the island of Sumatra. It was originally part of the North Bengkulu Regency, but on 25 February 2003 that regency was split into two parts, the northwestern part created as a separate Mukomuko Regency. It covers a land area of 4,138.66 km^{2} and had a population of 155,753 at the 2010 census, which rose to 190,498 at the 2020 census; the official estimate as at mid 2025 was 204,560 (comprising 105,409 males and 99,151 females). The administrative centre of the Mukomuko Regency is Mukomuko town.

In the 18th and 19th Centuries, it was known to the British East India Company as "Moco Moco".

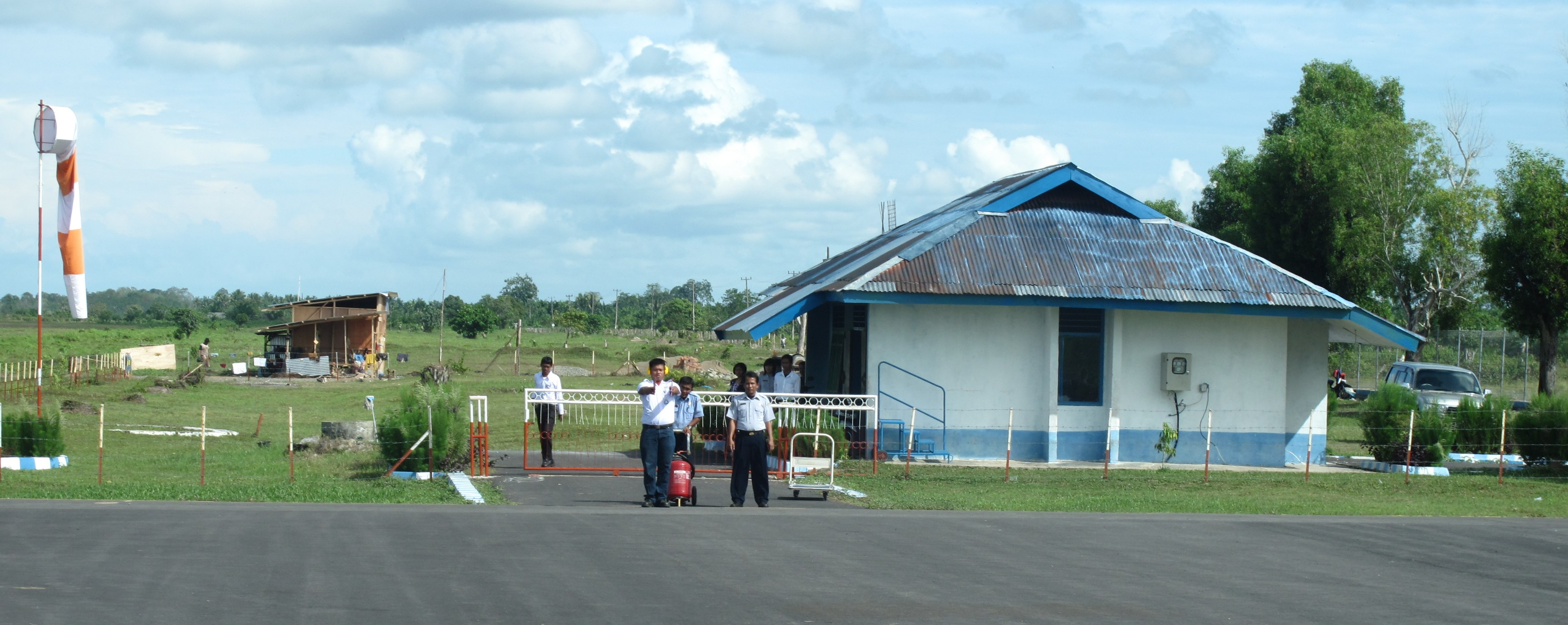
Mukomuko Airport

== History ==
The indigenous people of Mukomuko are the Mukomuko, who are a part of the Minangkabau ethnic group. Traditionally, in culture and language, Mukomuko is close to the Pesisir Selatan Regency in West Sumatra Province.

In the past the Mukomuko area was part of the West Coast region (Pasisie Baraik) Minangkabau tribe. The Mukomuko people are an ethnic group that is closely related to the Minangkabau or the closest Minangkabau ethnic group. The Mukomuko area is also an overseas Minangkabau region which is often also called the Riak nan Berdebur namely the area along the West Coast from Padang to South Bengkulu. However, since the British colonial period, the Mukomuko area has been included in the Bengkulu administration (Bencoolen). Since then they have been separated from their comrades in West Sumatra and become an integral part of the Bengkulu region. This continued during the Dutch colonial period, Japanese occupation, until the independence period.

During the independence period, the Mukomuko region was included in the North Bengkulu Regency. The subsequent division of regencies and cities has occurred in almost all provinces in Indonesia, including Bengkulu Province. In early 2003, the province added five new regencies (as stipulated by Law No.3 of 2003), including the splitting off of a new Mukomuo Regency from the northern part of North Bengkulu Regency. The South Bengkulu Regency was also divided into South Bengkulu, Seluma, and Kaur regencies, while Rejang Lebong Regency was divided into Rejang Lebong, Kepahiang and Lebong regencies.

Similar to other districts in Bengkulu, Mukomuko was also affected by an earthquake on 13 September 2007, when an earthquake devastated a part of the population of Mukomuko, especially in the Lubuk Pinang District.

Sending transmigrants to Bengkulu has flared up again since 1967. In fact, Presidential Decree of the Republic of Indonesia Number 2 of 1973 stipulates Bengkulu Province and nine other provinces as transmigration areas outside Java. One of the transmigrant destinations is Bengkulu Utara and this policy continues to this day. In 2004 Bengkulu still received additional transmigrants. Each transmigrant family is provided with two hectares of land. The majority of transmigrants from Java are farmers. Now these migrant population centers have grown into economic centers.

Population growth is very fast with this transmigration program. This has also caused a change in the composition of the population in the Mukomuko Regency area. Currently, the number of immigrants from Java has far exceeded the number of natives of Mukomuko. So that in reality today, indigenous people are a minority in Mukomuko Regency.

== Tourism ==
Attractions in Mukomuko Regency include: Abrasion Beach (But Lauik), Beautiful Lotus Lake, Wide Lake, Nimbung Lake, Manjunto Air Dam, Fort Anna (Benteng Anna), Air Rami Beach, Pandan Wangi Beach, the dam which was inaugurated by President Soeharto is located in Kec.V Koto and no less interesting is Turtle conservation, located in the village of Retak Ilir, Ipuh District.

The local cultural heritage, which includes the cultural splendor and history of the kingdom, can be explored by both domestic and foreign tourists visiting this Regency, and will continue to be preserved for the sake of the continuity of the legacy of the past and history.

== Administrative districts ==
Mukomuko Regency is divided into fifteen districts (kecamatan), listed below with their areas and their populations at the 2010 census and the 2020 census, together with the official estimates as at mid 2025. The table also includes the locations of the district administrative centres, the number of administrative villages in each district (totaling 148 rural desa and 3 urban kelurahan - the latter all in Kota Mukomuko District), and its post codes.

Kode Wilayah	Name of District (kecamatan)	Area in km^{2}	Pop'n census 2010	Pop'n census 2020	Pop'n estimate mid 2025	Admin centre	No. of villages	Post code
17.06.05	Ipuh	195.48	16,304	19,044	19,980	Medan Jaya	16	38763
17.06.07	Air Rami	123.29	10,235	13,115	14,390	Arga Jaya	12	38764
17.06.06	Malin Deman	852.55	6,317	6,828	6,900	Talang Arah	7	38762
17.06.04	Pondok Suguh	555.66	11,033	13,591	14,631	Pondok Kandang	11	38766
17.06.15	Sungai Rumbai	336.19	6,605	9,076	10,301	Gajah Mati	9	38761
17.06.08	Teramang Jaya	412.60	9,893	12,421	13,495	Pasar Bantal	13	38760
17.06.03	Teras Terunjam	84.53	6,888	7,977	8,335	Teras Terunjam	8	38758
17.06.10	Penarik	308.72	20,412	24,407	25,900	Lubuk Mukti	14	38768
17.06.09	Selagan Raya	439.60	8,326	10,654	11,682	Sungai Ipuh	12	38769
17.06.02	Kota Mukomuko (Mukomuko town)	148.14	15,005	18,604	20,090	Pasar Mukumuko	9 ^{(a)}	38711: 38719
17.06.14	Air Dikit	87.66	5,622	7,112	7,755	Dusun Baru V Koto	7	38765
17.06.11	XIV Koto	70.20	10,693	13,623	14,906	Lubuk Sanai	8	38755
17.06.01	Lubuk Pinang	69.07	12,545	14,653	15,373	Lubuk Pinang	7	38756
17.06.13	Air Manjunto	65.20	8,928	11,511	12,668	Manjunto Jaya	8	38767
17.06.12	V Koto	389.79	6,947	7,882	8,154	Lalang Luas	10	38757
	Totals	4,146.52	155,753	190,498	204,560	Kota Mikomuko	151	

Note: (a) comprising 3 kelurahan (Bandar Ratu, Koto Jaya and Pasar Mukomuko) and 6 desa.
