= Mukomuko city =

Mukomuko
- Location in Bengkulu and Indonesia Mukomuko (Indonesia)
- Coordinates: 2°33′11.2″S 101°6′13.61″E
- Country: Indonesia
- Province: Bengkulu
- Regency: Mukomuko Regency
- District: Mukomuko District
- Elevation: 30 ft (9 m)

Population (mid 2023 estimate)
  - Total: 19,481
- Time zone: UTC+7 (Indonesia Western Standard Time)

Mukomuko (Indonesian pronunciation: [mukoˈmuko]) is a town, district and the regency seat of Mukomuko Regency in Bengkulu province, Indonesia. Its population was officially estimated at 19,481 in mid 2023.

== Climate ==
Mukomuko has a tropical rainforest climate (Af) with heavy to very heavy rainfall year-round.

Climate data for Mukomuko
Month	Jan	Feb	Mar	Apr	May	Jun	Jul	Aug	Sep	Oct	Nov	Dec	Year
Mean daily maximum °C (°F)	31.1 (88.0)	31.5 (88.7)	31.6 (88.9)	31.8 (89.2)	32.0 (89.6)	31.7 (89.1)	31.6 (88.9)	31.5 (88.7)	31.1 (88.0)	30.9 (87.6)	31.0 (87.8)	30.8 (87.4)	31.4 (88.5)
Daily mean °C (°F)	26.8 (80.2)	27.0 (80.6)	27.1 (80.8)	27.4 (81.3)	27.5 (81.5)	27.0 (80.6)	26.9 (80.4)	26.9 (80.4)	26.8 (80.2)	26.8 (80.2)	26.9 (80.4)	26.8 (80.2)	27.0 (80.6)
Mean daily minimum °C (°F)	22.6 (72.7)	22.6 (72.7)	22.7 (72.9)	23.1 (73.6)	23.0 (73.4)	22.4 (72.3)	22.2 (72.0)	22.3 (72.1)	22.5 (72.5)	22.7 (72.9)	22.8 (73.0)	22.8 (73.0)	22.6 (72.8)
Average precipitation mm (inches)	323 (12.7)	232 (9.1)	266 (10.5)	280 (11.0)	214 (8.4)	170 (6.7)	175 (6.9)	222 (8.7)	336 (13.2)	422 (16.6)	419 (16.5)	397 (15.6)	3,456 (135.9)
Source: Climate-Data.org
