= North Bengkulu Regency =

Regency in Bengkulu, Indonesia

North Bengkulu Regency Kabupaten Bengkulu Utara
- Regency
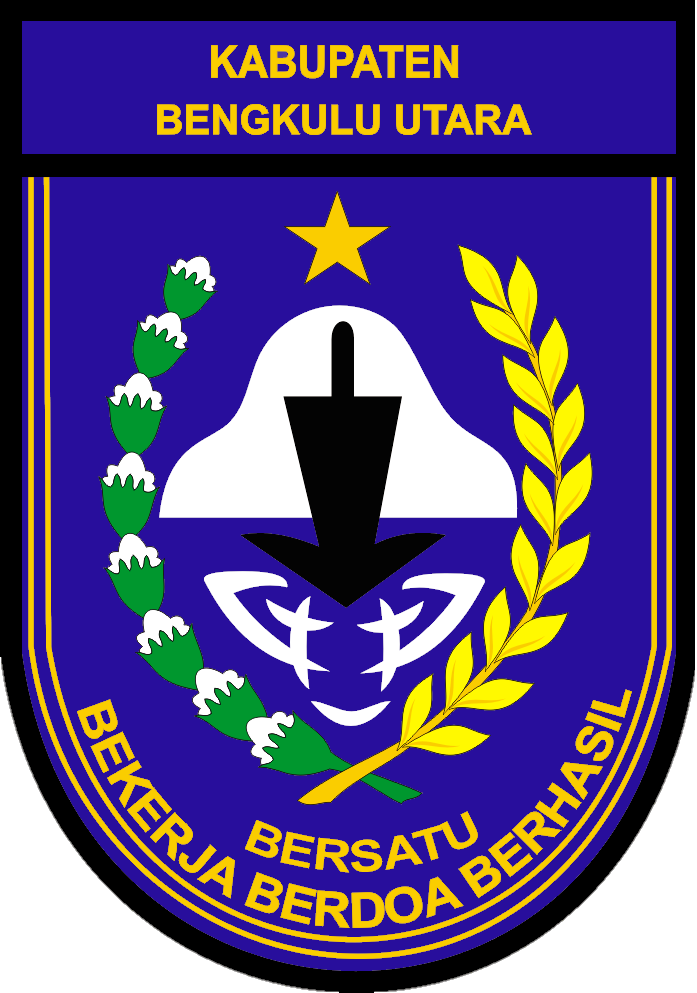
- Coat of arms
- Motto: Bersatu Bekerja Berdoa Berhasil (Unite Work Pray Success)
- Coordinates: 3.3333°S 102.0500°E
- Country: Indonesia
- Province: Bengkulu
- Regency seat: Arga Makmur

Government
  - Regent: Arie Septia Adinata
  - Vice Regent: Sumarno

Area
  - Total: 4,324.60 km^{2} (1,669.74 sq mi)

Population (mid 2025 estimateAir Napal)
  - Total: 311,936
  - Density: 72.1306/km^{2} (186.817/sq mi)
- Time zone: UTC+7 (WIB)

North Bengkulu (Indonesian: Bengkulu Utara; pronounced [bəŋˌkulu uˈt̪ara]) is a regency (kabupaten) of Bengkulu Province, Indonesia, on the island of Sumatra. It originally covered much of the northern part of Bengkulu Province, but on 25 February 2003 the most northwesterly districts were split off to form a separate Mukomuko Regency (Kabupaten Mukumuko), and on 24 June 2008 the most southeastern districts were likewise split off to create a new Central Bengkulu Regency (Kabupaten Bengkulu Tengah).

The residual regency now covers an area of 4,324.60 km^{2}, and it had a population of 257,675 at the 2010 Census and 296,523 at the 2020 Census; the official estimate as at mid 2025 was 311,936 (comprising 159,310 males and 152,626 females). The administrative centre is at the town of Arga Makmur.

== Administrative districts ==
At the 2010 Census the Regency was divided into twelve districts (Indonesian: kecamatan), but subsequently seven additional districts have been created by the splitting of existing ones. The nineteen districts are detailed below with their areas and populations at the 2010 Census and the 2020 Census, together with the official estimates as at mid 2025. The table also includes the locations of the district administrative centres, the number of administrative villages in each district (a total of 215 rural desa and 5 urban kelurahan), and its post code.

Kode Wilayah	Name of District (kecamatan)	Area in km^{2}	Pop'n 2010 Census	Pop'n 2020 Census	Pop'n mid 2025 Estimate	Admin centre	No. of villages	Post code
17.03.01	Enggano ^{(a)} (island)	397.20	2,691	4,035	4,387	Apoho	6	38387
17.03.06	Kerkap	100.64	22,874	12,423	13,088	Lubuk Durian	18 ^{(b)}	38379
17.03.16	Air Napal	44.95	11,523	9,791	10,380	Pasar Tebat	12	38373
17.03.15	Air Besi	85.44	10,323	9,747	10,379	Dusun Curup	15	38575
17.03.19	Hulu Palik	127.35	^{(c)}	11,232	11,889	Taba Padang Kol	15	38374
17.03.22	Tanjung Agung Palik	53.03	^{(c)}	8,020	8,506	Tanjung Agung Palik	10	38576
17.03.07	Kota Arga Makmur	62.51	47,457	42,362	43,809	Gunung Agung	16 ^{(d)}	38611: 38619
17.03.21	Arma Jaya	68.07	^{(c)}	12,577	13,456	Sumber Agung	12 ^{(e)}	38611
17.03.10	Lais	78.81	17,195	13,599	14,273	Pal 30	13 ^{(f)}	38654
17.03.11	Batik Nau	175.14	11,727	13,599	13,843	Samban Jaya	15	38656
17.03.08	Giri Mulya	172.93	13,135	15,037	15,703	Giri Mulya	6	38655
17.03.20	Air Padang	80.88	^{(c)}	6,385	6,997	Kembang Manis	10	38653
17.03.09	Padang Jaya	418.97	27,397	31,928	33,152	Padang Jaya	12	38657
17.03.12	Ketahun	126.63	39,704	21,054	21,173	Pasar Ketahun	11	38361
17.03.13	Napal Putih	705.54	17,582	8,527	8,717	Napal Putih	10	38363
17.03.23	Uluk Kupai	251.99	^{(c)}	13,153	14,653	Tanjung Dalam	10	38364
17.03.24	Pinang Raya	433.78	^{(c)}	23,464	25,809	Sumber Mulya	10	38362
17.03.14	Putri Hijau ^{(g)}	148.24	36,067	23,659	23,759	Pasar Baru Kota Bani	9	38326
17.03.25	Marga Sakti Sebelat	792.50	^{(c)}	16,383	17,963	Suka Baru	10	38325
	Totals	4,324.60	257,675	296,523	311,936	Arga Makmur	220	

Notes: (a) Besides Enggano Island (Pulau Enggano) in the Indian Ocean, this district includes four small islands off its coast - Pulau Dua, Pulau Merbau, Pulau Bangkai and Pulau Satu. (b) including the kelurahan of Lubuk Durian.
(c) the 2010 population of these new districts (established since 2010) are included in the figures for the districts from which they were split off.
(d) including the two kelurahan of Gunung Alam and Purwodadi. (e) including the kelurahan of Kemunu. (f) including the kelurahan of Pasar Lais.
(g) includes Mega Island (Pulau Mega) - like Enggano Island, this is a small barrier island roughly halfway between Enggano and South Pagai Island of West Sumatra.
