= Razie Jachya =

Indonesian bureaucrat (1930–2023)

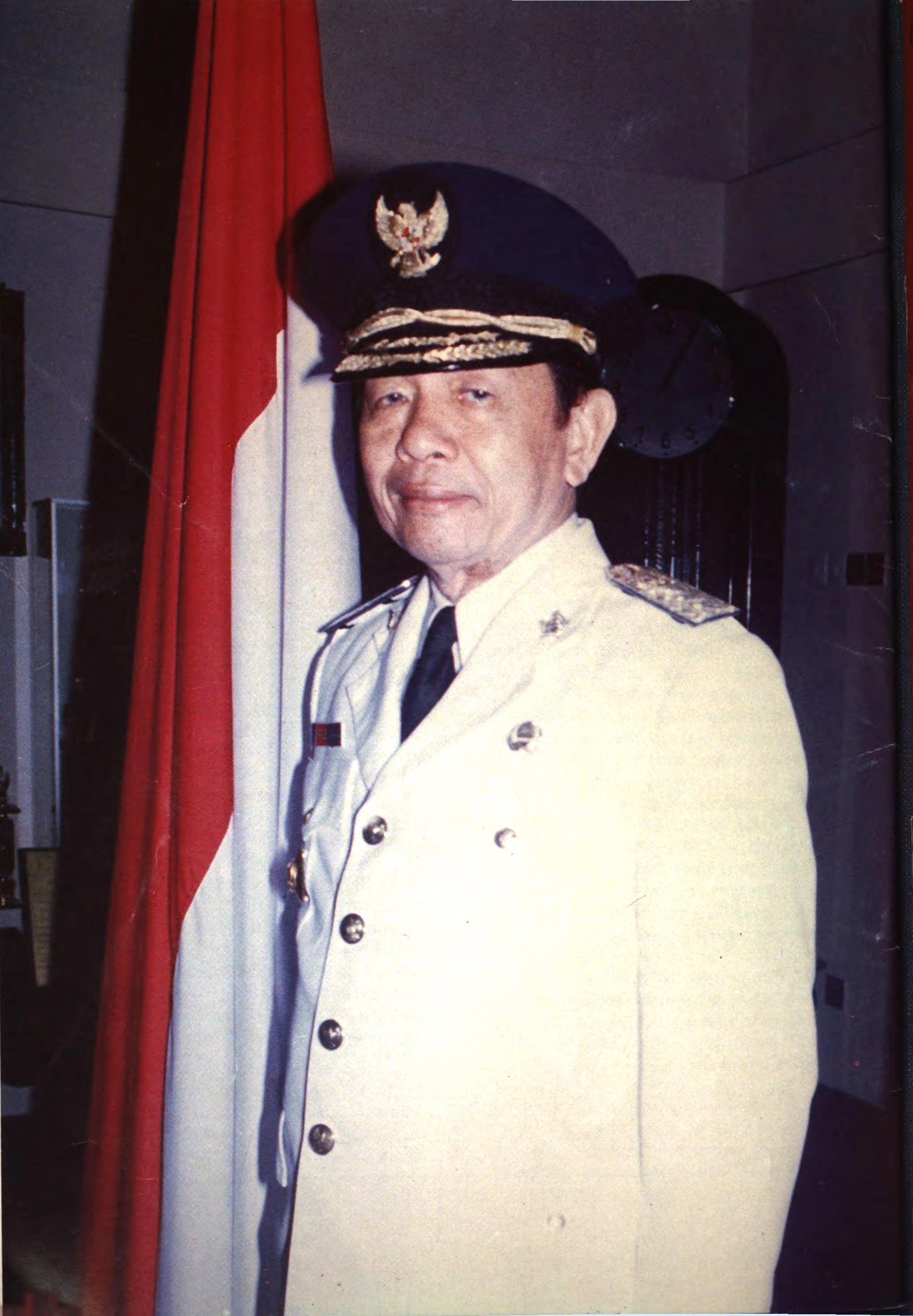
- Jachya in 1989

Governor of Bengkulu
- In office 17 July 1989 – 16 July 1994
- Preceded by: Soeprapto
- Succeeded by: Adjis Ahmad

Vice Governor of Bengkulu
- In office July 1987 – 17 July 1989
- Governor: Soeprapto
- Preceded by: Sofian Yusuf
- Succeeded by: Usup Supriyadi

Personal details
- Born: 11 September 1930 Manna, South Bengkulu, Dutch East Indies
- Died: 3 May 2023 (aged 92) Bengkulu, Indonesia
- Party: Golkar
- Spouse: Djalaliah (m. 1950)
- Children: 5
- Education: Airlangga University (no degree); Institute of Governance Sciences (drs.)

Abdullah Razie Jachya (11 September 1930 – 3 May 2023) was an Indonesian bureaucrat. He was the governor of Bengkulu from 1989 until 1994. Previously, he held various offices inside the province's government, including as provincial secretary from 1983 until 1987 and vice governor from 1987 until 1989.

== Early life and education ==
Jachya was born on 11 September 1930 (Note: Contemporary sources mentioned his birth date as 11 September 1928 and his birthplace in Kepahiang, Bengkulu.) in Manna, a small town in the region of South Bengkulu, as the son of Muhammad Jachya. He completed his basic education at a Muhammadiyah-organized Hollandsch-Inlandsche School (HIS, equivalent to primary school) in Curup in 1944 and Chu-Gakko (middle school) in the Bengkulu city in 1945. He later moved to Malang, East Java, and continued his education at a local state high school from 1950 to 1953. He studied law at the Airlangga University in Surabaya from 1953 to 1957, but did not complete his degree.

== Career ==
=== Bureaucratic career ===
Jachya's career began as a member of the Indonesian army in Bengkulu during the Indonesian Revolution. He was assigned to the Military Police Corps in Tanjung Karang, Lampung. Afterwards, he joined the civil service of South Bengkulu and worked as a paymaster. In a later interview, Jachya described his role as a paymaster, noting that he often received money from people without any apparent reason.

After two years working in South Bengkulu, Jachya was sent to Medan to attend a one-year course for civil servants. He completed the course in 1960 and was sent to study again three years later at the Civil Service Academy in Malang. Upon finishing his study in the academy, Jachya was assigned as a protocol staff at the office of the West Java governor's office and later at the South Sumatra governor's office.

In 1967, the Indonesian government formed the Bengkulu province from South Sumatra. As a Bengkulu native, Jachya returned to his hometown, South Bengkulu, and became the regency's financial inspector. Upon the appointment of a definitive governor for Bengkulu in 1968, Jachya was promoted and became the regional secretary of South Bengkulu. During his tenure as regional secretary, Jachya became the acting regent of South Bengkulu for about a year. He was not nominated as a definitive officeholder and was instead sent to study at the Institute of Governance Sciences in Jakarta.

Jachya graduated from the Institute of Governance Sciences with a doctorandus. He was then assigned to the Bengkulu's governor office in 1977 and held several portofolios related to regional government. He eventually became the provincial secretary in 1983 under Governor Soeprapto. Soeprapto's vice governor, Sofian Yusuf, was suspended in 1986 for alleged ties to the banned Communist Party of Indonesia. Jachya replaced him as vice governor in July 1987. In September 1988, Jachya was elected as the chairman of Golkar, the government party, in Bengkulu.

=== Governor of Bengkulu ===
After Soeprapto ended his second term as governor, Jachya was nominated as his replacement. His nomination was approved by the local parliament and Jachya was installed as governor on 17 July 1989. Several days after his installation, Jachya and Soeprapto visited President Suharto. Suharto instructed him "not to do major changes" on Soeprapto's work as governor and to "complete the success" that Soeprapto has achieved.

Despite the instructions from the President, Jachya began scrutizining the works of his predecessor. He often indicated his displeasure with the irrigation works that had been undertaken during Soeprapto's era. At a speech during the 21st anniversary of Bengkulu on 21 November 1989, Jachya criticized the irrigation projects in Bengkulu for not following up with the opening of new rice fields, therefore rendering the irrigations useless.

Under his leadership, the provincial government began a joint venture with private companies and cooperated with the local chamber of commerce to promote the province to foreign investors. His efforts in attracting foreign investors began to bear fruit in early 1990s, as Bengkulu began exporting rubber to the United States. He also repeatedly encouraged non-governmental organizations in Bengkulu to take part in the development of the province.

In the health sector, Jachya oversaw the development of Bengkulu's central hospital (under future health minister Achmad Sujudi) from a small provincial central hospital to a second-grade central hospital. He declared Bengkulu a smoke-free province in April 1992 and began establishing smoking areas several months later.

Jachya was replaced as governor on 16 July 1994 by the regent of South Bengkulu, Adjis Ahmad. After his retirement, he resided at his house in Bengkulu City. He joined the Veterans' Legion of Indonesia.

== Personal life and death ==
Jachya was married to Djalaliah Jachya in 1950. The couple has five children.

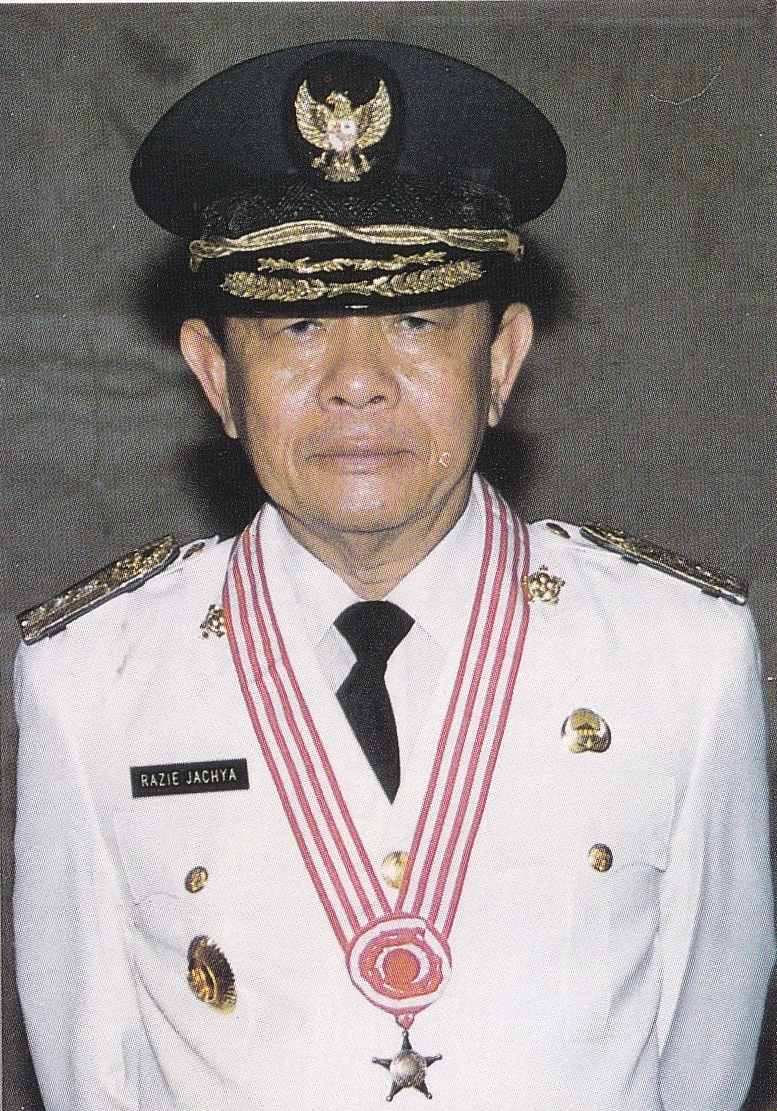
Razie Jachya with his Guerilla Star award.

Jachya died at his house on the morning of 3 May 2023. He was 92. Prior to his death, Jachya wished not to be buried at a heroes cemetery, despite having the right to be buried there due to his Guerrilla Star award. He was instead buried at the Padang Dedok Public Cemetery in Bengkulu city. Several Bengkulu officials, including incumbent governor Rohidin Mersyah and senator Ahmad Kanedi, delivered their eulogies.
