= List of incumbent regional heads and deputy regional heads in Bengkulu =

The following is an article about the list of Regional Heads and Deputy Regional Heads in 10 regencies/cities in Bengkulu who are currently still serving.

== List ==
| Regency/ City | Photo of the Regent/ Mayor | Regent/ Mayor | Photo of Deputy Regent/ Mayor | Deputy Regent/ Mayor | Taking Office | End of Office (Planned) | Ref. |
|---|---|---|---|---|---|---|---|
| South Bengkulu; Regency List of Regents/Deputy Regents | | Rifa’i Tajudin | | Yevri Sudianto | 11 June 2025 | 11 June 2030 | |
| Central Bengkulu; Regency List of Regents/Deputy Regents | | Rachmat Riyanto | | Tarmizi | 20 February 2025 | 20 February 2030 | |
| North Bengkulu; Regency List of Regents/Deputy Regents | | Arie Septia Adinata | | Sumarno | 20 February 2025 | 20 February 2030 | |
| Kaur; Regency List of Regents/Deputy Regents | | Gusril Pausi | | Abdul Hamid | 20 February 2025 | 20 February 2030 | |
| Kepahiang; Regency List of Regents/Deputy Regents | | Zurdi Nata | | Abdul Hafizh | 20 February 2025 | 20 February 2030 | |
| Lebong; Regency List of Regents/Deputy Regents | | Azhari | | Bambang Agus Suprabudi | 20 February 2025 | 20 February 2030 | |
| Mukomuko; Regency List of Regents/Deputy Regents | | Choirul Huda | | Rahmadi | 20 February 2025 | 20 February 2030 | |
| Rejang Lebong; Regency List of Regents/Deputy Regents | | Hendri (Acting Officer) | | | 14 March 2026 | 20 February 2030 | |
| Seluma; Regency List of Regents/Deputy Regents | | Teddy Rahman | | Gustianto | 20 February 2025 | 20 February 2030 | |
| Bengkulu; City List of Mayors/Deputy mayors | | Dedy Wahyudi | | Ronny Pebriyanto L. Tobing | 20 February 2025 | 20 February 2030 | |

Notes

- "Commencement of office" is the inauguration date at the beginning or during the current term of office. For acting regents/mayors, it is the date of appointment or extension as acting regent/mayor.
- Based on the Constitutional Court decision Number 27/PUU-XXII/2024, the Governor and Deputy Governor, Regent and Deputy Regent, and Mayor and Deputy Mayor elected in 2020 shall serve until the inauguration of the Governor and Deputy Governor, Regent and Deputy Regent, and Mayor and Deputy Mayor elected in the 2024 national simultaneous elections as long as the term of office does not exceed 5 (five) years.

== See also ==
- Bengkulu
