= 2024 Bengkulu gubernatorial election =

- 27 November 2024
- Turnout: 79.42% (▲0.82pp)
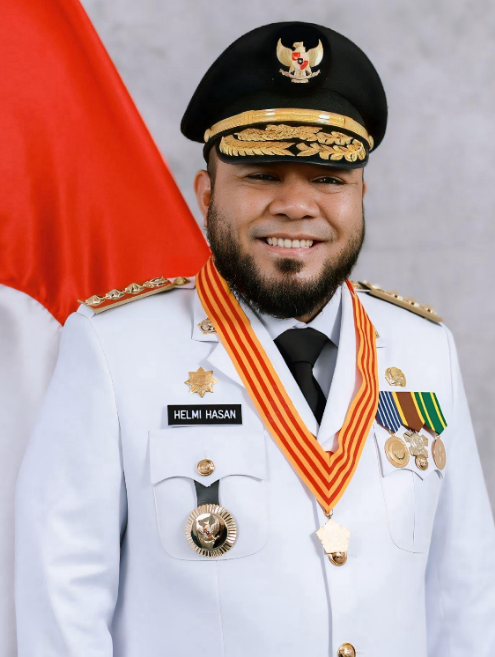

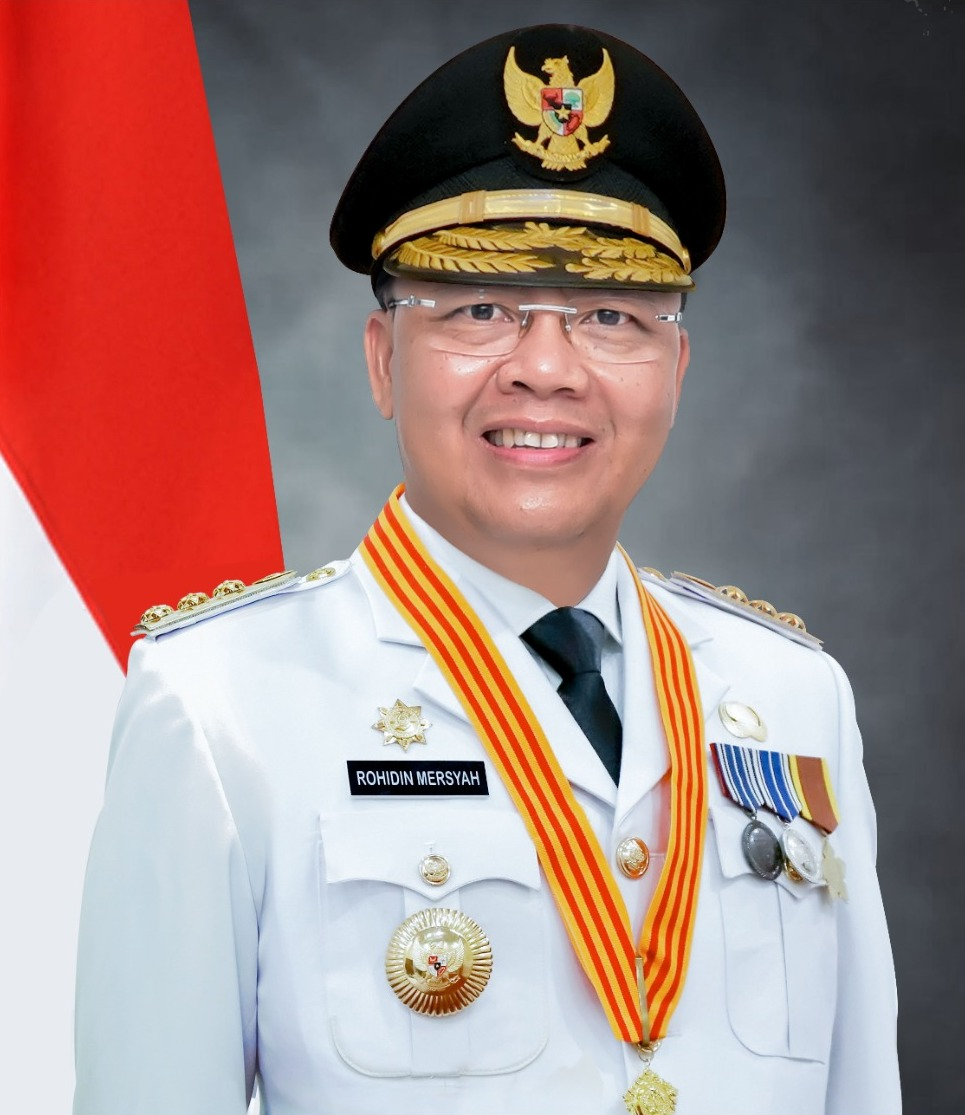
Candidate	Helmi Hasan	Rohidin Mersyah
Party	PAN	Golkar
Alliance	KIM Plus	–
Running mate	Mian	Meriani
Popular vote	616,469	502,477
Percentage	55.09%	44.91%
- Results map by district
Governor before election
Rosjonsyah Syahili (acting)
PDI-P
Elected Governor
Helmi Hasan
PAN

The 2024 Bengkulu gubernatorial election was held on 27 November 2024 as part of nationwide local elections to elect the governor and vice governor of Bengkulu for a five-year term. The previous election was held in 2020. The election was won by Helmi Hasan of the National Mandate Party (PAN) with 55% of the vote. He defeated former Governor Rohidin Mersyah of Golkar, who received 44%.

== Electoral system ==
The election, like other local elections in 2024, follow the first-past-the-post system where the candidate with the most votes wins the election, even if they do not win a majority. It is possible for a candidate to run uncontested, in which case the candidate is still required to win a majority of votes "against" an "empty box" option. Should the candidate fail to do so, the election will be repeated on a later date.

== Candidates ==
According to electoral regulations, in order to qualify for the election, candidates were required to secure support from a political party or a coalition of parties controlling 9 seats (20 percent of all seats) in the Bengkulu Regional House of Representatives (DPRD). Golkar, with 10 seats from the 2024 legislative election, is the only party eligible to nominate a gubernatorial candidate without forming a coalition with other parties. However, following a Constitutional Court of Indonesia decision in August 2024, the political support required to nominate a candidate was lowered to between 6.5 and 10 percent of the popular vote. Candidates may alternatively demonstrate support to run as an independent in form of photocopies of identity cards, which in Bengkulu's case corresponds to 149,483 copies. One independent pair of candidates registered with the General Elections Commission (KPU): Dempo Xler–Ahmad Kanedi, who claimed to have submitted 184 thousand proofs of support. Following verification, KPU announced that only 118 thousand proofs were verifiable, and provided five days for Xler and Kanedi to submit further proofs or update rejected proofs.

=== Declared ===
The following candidates qualified to contest the election:

1
Candidate from PAN and PDI-P
Helmi Hasan	Mian
for Governor	for Vice Governor
Mayor of Bengkulu (2013–2023)	Regent of North Bengkulu (2021–2025)
Parties
25 / 45 (56%) PKB (3 seats); Gerindra (6 seats); PDI-P (6 seats); PAN (6 seats); Demokrat (4 seats)

2
Candidate from Golkar and Independent
Rohidin Mersyah	Meriani
for Governor	for Vice Governor
Governor of Bengkulu (2021–2024)	Public Figure
Parties
16 / 45 (36%) Golkar (10 seats); PKS (2 seats); Hanura (3 seats); PPP (1 seat)

=== Potential ===
The following are individuals who have either been publicly mentioned as a potential candidate by a political party in the DPRD, publicly declared their candidacy with press coverage, or considered as a potential candidate by media outlets:

- Rohidin Mersyah (Golkar), former governor.
- Ahmad Hijazi, former two-term regent of Rejang Lebong.
- Dempo Xler (Independent), member of Bengkulu DPRD.

- Ahmad Kanedi (Independent), two-term senator from Bengkulu (as running mate).

== Political map ==
Following the 2024 Indonesian legislative election, ten political parties are represented in the Bengkulu DPRD:

Political parties	Seat count
Party of Functional Groups (Golkar)	10 / 45
Indonesian Democratic Party of Struggle (PDI-P)	6 / 45
Great Indonesia Movement Party (Gerindra)	6 / 45
National Mandate Party (PAN)	6 / 45
NasDem Party	4 / 45
Democratic Party (Demokrat)	4 / 45
People's Conscience Party (Hanura)	3 / 45
National Awakening Party (PKB)	3 / 45
Prosperous Justice Party (PKS)	2 / 45
United Development Party (PPP)	1 / 45

== Campaign ==
On 23 November 2024, incumbent governor and candidate Rohidin Mersyah was arrested by the Corruption Eradication Commission under charges of requesting money from civil servants out of budgetary items to fund the re-election campaign.

== Results ==
Candidate	Running mate	Party	Votes	%
Helmi Hasan	Mian	National Mandate Party	616,469	55.09
Rohidin Mersyah	Meriani	Golkar	502,477	44.91
Total			1,118,946	100.00
Valid votes			1,118,946	93.68
Invalid votes			75,474	6.32
Total votes			1,194,420	100.00
Registered voters/turnout			1,503,923	79.42
Source: KPU Bengkulu
