= Avé-Lallemant =

Avé-Lallemant or Avé Lallemant is a surname. Notable people with the surname include:

- Hans Avé Lallemant (1938–2016), Dutch born-American geologist
- Julius Léopold Eduard Avé-Lallemant (1803–1867), German botanist
- Robert Christian Avé-Lallemant (1812–1884), German physician and explorer
- Theodor Avé-Lallemant (1806–1890), German musician and music teacher
