= Rohidin Mersyah =

Indonesian politician

- ꤽꥋꥁꥇꤴꥇꥐ ꤸꥉꥑꤼ꥓ꤿꥁ꥓
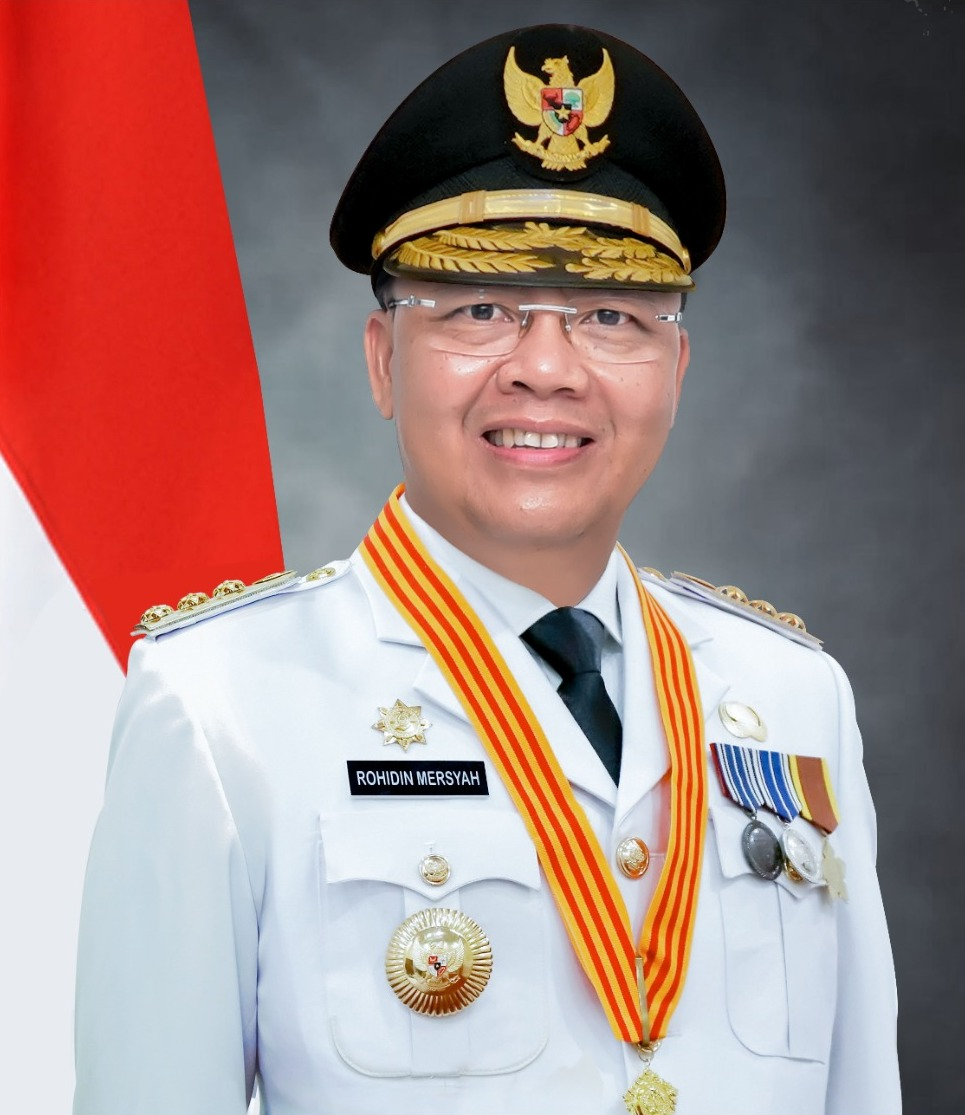

10th Governor of Bengkulu
- In office 25 February 2021 – 24 November 2024
- Deputy: Rosjonsyah Syahili
- Preceded by: Robert Simbolon (acting)
- Succeeded by: Rosjonsyah Syahili (acting); Helmi Hasan
- In office 10 December 2018 – 12 February 2021; Acting: 22 June 2017 – 10 December 2018
- Deputy: Dedy Ermansyah
- Preceded by: Ridwan Mukti
- Succeeded by: Hamka Sabri (caretaker)

Vice Governor of Bengkulu
- In office 12 February 2016 – 22 June 2017
- Governor: Ridwan Mukti
- Preceded by: Sultan Bachtiar Najamudin
- Succeeded by: Dedy Ermansyah

Vice regent of South Bengkulu
- In office 16 September 2010 – 16 September 2015
- Preceded by: Jani Hairin
- Succeeded by: Gusnan Mulyadi

Personal details
- Born: 9 January 1970 (age 56) Manna, Bengkulu, Indonesia
- Party: Golkar
- Spouse: Derta Wahyulin
- Children: 3
- Education: Gadjah Mada University; IPB University
- Profession: Politician

Rohidin Mersyah (Rejang: ꤽꥋꥁꥇꤴꥇꥐ ꤸꥉꥑꤼ꥓ꤿꥁ꥓; born 9 January 1970) is an Indonesian politician who has served as governor of Bengkulu from December 2018 to November 2024.

== Early life ==
Mersyah was born in the village of Gelumbang, in Manna, South Bengkulu, on 9 January 1970 as the fifth child of nine. He completed his basic education in South Bengkulu, before studying veterinary medicine at Gadjah Mada University.

== Career ==
In 2010, Mersyah ran as a vice-regent candidate for the South Bengkulu Regency. Initially, him and the regent candidate Reskan Effendi lost the election with just 48.06% of votes, but following a lawsuit to the Constitutional Court their opponent was disqualified as he had previously been jailed for murder and was hence ineligible as a candidate. He ran as a deputy gubernatorial candidate in the 2015 election, and won the election.

Bengkulu's governor following the election, Ridwan Mukti, was arrested by the Corruption Eradication Commission in June 2017 due to alleged bribery. Mersyah was sworn in as full governor on 10 December 2018.

He was reelected as governor following the 2020 gubernatorial election. On 23 November 2024, during his reelection bid in the 2024 gubernatorial election, Mersyah was arrested by the Corruption Eradication Commission on charges of demanding money from civil servants to fund his campaign. Mersyah would lose the election to Bengkulu city mayor and 2020 gubernatorial candidate Helmi Hasan. On 27 August 2025, he was sentenced to ten years' prison and ordered to return Rp 39.6 billion to the state.

== Honours ==
- Satyalancana Karya Satya (10 Years) and (20 Years)
- Satyalancana Wira Karya - 2021
- Lencana Melati - 2019
- Lencana Darma Bakti - 2013
