= Bungin Tambun II =

- Location in Bengkulu and Indonesia Bungin Tambun II (Indonesia)
- Coordinates: 4°20′28.752″S 103°12′59.3676″E
- Country: Indonesia
- Province: Bengkulu
- Regency: Kaur Regency
- District: Padang Guci Hulu District
- Elevation: 3,120 ft (951 m)

Population (2010)
  - Total: 855
- Time zone: UTC+7 (Indonesia Western Standard Time)

Bungin Tambun II is a village in Padang Guci Hulu district, Kaur Regency in Bengkulu province and is one of three villages in the district with the name "Bungin Tambun". Its population is 855.

== Climate ==
Bungin Tambun II has a cool tropical rainforest climate (Af) due to altitude with heavy rainfall year-round.

Climate data for Bungin Tambun II
Month	Jan	Feb	Mar	Apr	May	Jun	Jul	Aug	Sep	Oct	Nov	Dec	Year
Mean daily maximum °C (°F)	26.1 (79.0)	26.6 (79.9)	26.8 (80.2)	27.0 (80.6)	27.0 (80.6)	26.6 (79.9)	26.4 (79.5)	26.4 (79.5)	26.5 (79.7)	26.5 (79.7)	26.3 (79.3)	26.0 (78.8)	26.5 (79.7)
Daily mean °C (°F)	21.4 (70.5)	21.6 (70.9)	21.8 (71.2)	22.1 (71.8)	22.1 (71.8)	21.6 (70.9)	21.2 (70.2)	21.2 (70.2)	21.4 (70.5)	21.6 (70.9)	21.5 (70.7)	21.3 (70.3)	21.6 (70.8)
Mean daily minimum °C (°F)	16.7 (62.1)	16.6 (61.9)	16.8 (62.2)	17.2 (63.0)	17.2 (63.0)	16.6 (61.9)	16.1 (61.0)	16.1 (61.0)	16.4 (61.5)	16.7 (62.1)	16.8 (62.2)	16.7 (62.1)	16.7 (62.0)
Average precipitation mm (inches)	311 (12.2)	264 (10.4)	283 (11.1)	282 (11.1)	230 (9.1)	156 (6.1)	127 (5.0)	158 (6.2)	195 (7.7)	281 (11.1)	312 (12.3)	312 (12.3)	2,911 (114.6)
Source: Climate-Data.org

== See also ==
- Bungin Tambun I
- Bungin Tambun III
