= Iskandar Ramis =

Indonesian military officer and politician

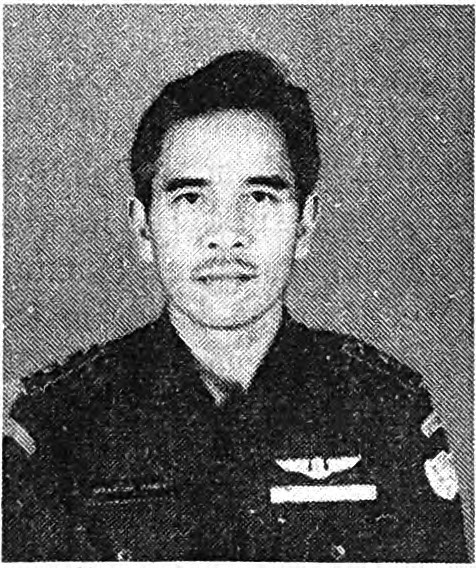

Vice Governor of Bengkulu
- In office 9 January 1996 – 9 January 2001
- Preceded by: Usup Supriyadi
- Succeeded by: Muhammad Syamlan

Personal details
- Born: 25 July 1946 (age 79) Curup, Rejang Lebong, Indonesia

Military service
- Allegiance: Indonesia
- Branch/service: Indonesian Army
- Years of service: 1970–1999
- Rank: Brigadier general

Iskandar Ramis (born 25 July 1946) is an Indonesian military officer and politician who served as the vice governor of Bengkulu from 1996 to 2001.

== Early life and military career ==
Iskandar was born on 25 July 1946 in Curup, a small town in the Bengkulu region. Iskandar entered the National Military Academy after graduating from high school and began his military career as a second lieutenant in 1970. He held various commands in the Indonesian Army, including the 621th Manuntung Infantry Battalion, from 1985 until 1986. Iskandar also studied at the University of Indonesia and obtained a Master of Science degree from the university in 1995. After that, Iskandar pursued further military studies for a few months at the Indonesian Armed Forces Staff and Command School (Sesko ABRI).

When Iskandar was sworn in as vice governor, he was still active in the military with the rank of colonel. He was promoted to brigadier general on 1 October 1996. Following the armed forces internal reformation that occurred in 1998, active military officers were banned from holding political offices, and Iskandar was retired from the military in 1999.

== Vice governor of Bengkulu ==
Shortly after finishing studying at Sesko ABRI, Iskandar was appointed as the vice governor of Bengkulu. He was installed on 9 January 1996, along with two other vice governors, by Minister of Home Affairs Yogie Suardi Memet.

Following the 2000 Enggano earthquake, Iskandar headed the earthquake's relief task force. Iskandar described that the main problem for the survivors was clean water access, as water pipes had already been damaged during the earthquake.

== Political career ==
After his term as vice governor ended, Iskandar continued to be involved in local Bengkulu politics. He led the Susilo Bambang Yudhoyono campaign team in Bengkulu in the 2004 and 2009 presidential election. After Yudhoyono won the presidency, Iskandar became a high-ranking official of the Bengkulu branch of the Democratic Party. Ramis also ran as a candidate for the People's Representative Council from the party in the 2009 Indonesian legislative election but lost to the top most candidate from the party list.

During the 2019 presidential election between Prabowo Subianto and the incumbent Joko Widodo, Iskandar led Prabowo Subianto's campaign team in Bengkulu. Prabowo lost the election in Bengkulu as well as at a national level.

== Later life ==
Aside from being involved in politics, Iskandar owns a gas station and a mosque in Bengkulu City. Iskandar also became a leading member of the Bengkulu Customary Council, Bengkulu Counter Terrorism Coordination Forum, Bengkulu Indonesian Governmental Society, and Bengkulu Union of Hajj Brotherhood.

Iskandar was brought to the emergency department while making calamansi juice in 2014. He accidentally spilled ice water from the fridge, causing him to slip and strike his head on a wall. Iskandar had to receive several stitches in his head after the accident.
