= Rahmad =

Rahmad is a name. People with the name include:

- Rahmad Darmawan
- Rahmad Mariman
- Rahmad Adi Mulyono
- Rahmad Mas'ud
- Tri Rahmad Priadi

== See also ==
- Rahmadi
