= Mayor of Bengkulu =

- Wali Kota Bengkulu
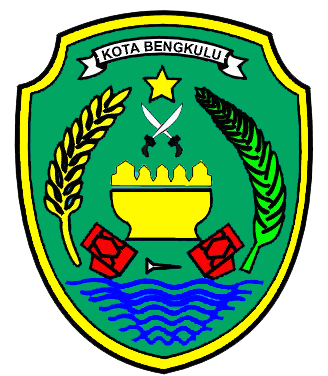
- Coat of arms of Bengkulu

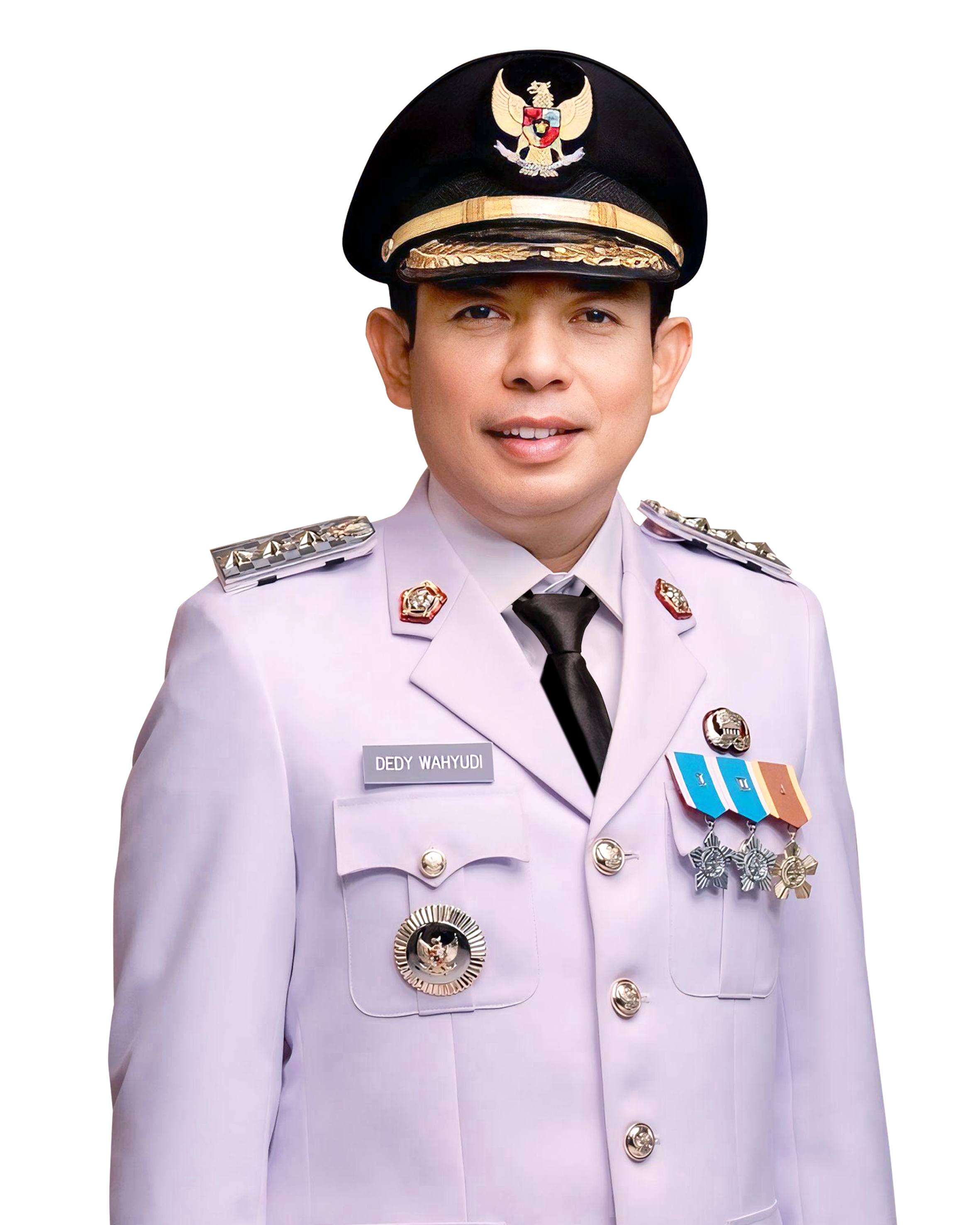
- Incumbent; Dedy Wahyudi since 20 February 2025
- Residence: Official Residence of the Mayor of Bengkulu
- Term length: 5 years
- Inaugural holder: Hamzah Sa’ari
- Formation: 1945
- Website: https://www.bengkulukota.go.id/

Mayor of Bengkulu is a politician elected to be responsible for organizing and managing the government of Bengkulu City, as part of the regional government system in Indonesia.

== List ==
The following is a list of the mayors of Bengkulu:

No	Portrait	Mayor	Beginning of office	End of Term	Period	Information	Vice Mayor
1		Hamzah Sa’ari	1945	1949	1		—
2		K.Z. Abidin	1949	1954	2		—
3		H. Hasan Basri	1954	1959	3		—
4		M. Salim Karim	1959	1964	4		—
5		M. Zen Rani	1964	1969	5		—
6		Mr. Z. Thabri Hamzah, S.H.	February 1969	February 1974	6		—
7		Drs. Syafiudin A.R.	1974	1979	7		—
8		Drs. Sulaiman Effendi	1979	1989	8		—
8		Drs. Sulaiman Effendi	1979	1989	9		—
9		Achmad Rusli, S.H.	1989	March 1992	10		—
10		Drs. H. A. Razie Yachya	March 1992	October 1992	10		—
11		Drs.Chairul Amri Z.	1992	2002	11		—
11		Drs.Chairul Amri Z.	1992	2002	12		—
12		H. A. Chalik Effendie	2002	2007	13		H. Ahmad Kanedi, S.H., M.H.
13		H. Ahmad Kanedi, S.H., M.H.	2007	2012	14		Edison Simbolon
_		Drs. H. Sumardi, M.M.	17 November 2012	21 Januari 2013			–
14		H. Helmi Hasan, S.E.	21 January 2013	21 January 2018	15		Patriana Sosialinda
–		H. Budiman Ismaun, M.Pd.	22 January 2018	24 September 2018			—
(14)		H. Helmi Hasan, S.E.	24 September 2018	24 September 2023			Dedy Wahyudi
–		Arif Gunadi	24 September 2023	20 February 2025			—
15		Dedy Wahyudi	20 February 2025	incumbent	17		Ronny Pebriyanto L. Tobing

National Mandate Party (PAN)

== See also ==
- Bengkulu
- List of incumbent regional heads and deputy regional heads in Bengkulu
