= Bungin Tambun I =

- Location in Bengkulu and Indonesia Bungin Tambun I (Indonesia)
- Coordinates: 4°17′9.1716″S 103°17′21.8472″E
- Country: Indonesia
- Province: Bengkulu
- Regency: Kaur Regency
- District: Padang Guci Hulu District
- Elevation: 8,117 ft (2,474 m)

Population (2010)
  - Total: 1,068
- Time zone: UTC+7 (Indonesia Western Standard Time)

Bungin Tambun I is a village in district Padang Guci Hulu, in Kaur Regency in Bengkulu province and is one of the three villages in the district with the name "Bungin Tambun". Its population is 1068.

== Climate ==
Bungin Tambun I has a cold subtropical highland climate (Cfb) with heavy rainfall year-round.

Climate data for Bungin Tambun I
Month	Jan	Feb	Mar	Apr	May	Jun	Jul	Aug	Sep	Oct	Nov	Dec	Year
Mean daily maximum °C (°F)	17.9 (64.2)	18.4 (65.1)	18.7 (65.7)	18.8 (65.8)	18.7 (65.7)	18.2 (64.8)	17.8 (64.0)	18.0 (64.4)	18.3 (64.9)	18.2 (64.8)	18.0 (64.4)	17.7 (63.9)	18.2 (64.8)
Daily mean °C (°F)	12.7 (54.9)	13.0 (55.4)	13.2 (55.8)	13.5 (56.3)	13.6 (56.5)	13.1 (55.6)	12.6 (54.7)	12.7 (54.9)	12.8 (55.0)	12.9 (55.2)	13.0 (55.4)	12.6 (54.7)	13.0 (55.4)
Mean daily minimum °C (°F)	7.6 (45.7)	7.6 (45.7)	7.7 (45.9)	8.2 (46.8)	8.5 (47.3)	8.0 (46.4)	7.4 (45.3)	7.4 (45.3)	7.4 (45.3)	7.7 (45.9)	8.0 (46.4)	7.6 (45.7)	7.8 (46.0)
Average precipitation mm (inches)	343 (13.5)	303 (11.9)	333 (13.1)	335 (13.2)	214 (8.4)	140 (5.5)	95 (3.7)	115 (4.5)	167 (6.6)	243 (9.6)	284 (11.2)	309 (12.2)	2,881 (113.4)
Source: Climate-Data.org

== See also ==
- Bungin Tambun II
- Bungin Tambun III
