= List of people from Bengkulu =

This is a listing of notable people born in, or notable for their association with, Bengkulu.

== A ==
- Hans Avé Lallemant, geologist

== B ==
- Frans de Bruijn Kops, Olympic footballer

== D ==
- Darussalam, actor

== F ==
- Fatmawati, National Hero of Indonesia, 1st First Lady of Indonesia

== S ==
- Asmar Latin Sani, suicide bomber
- Ferdinand Sinaga, professional footballer
