= Usup Supriyadi =

Indonesian military officer and politician

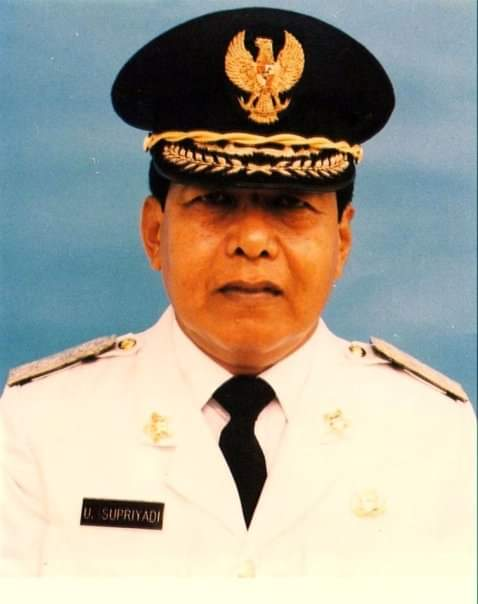

Vice Governor of Bengkulu
- In office 21 November 1990 – 9 January 1996
- Preceded by: Razie Jachya
- Succeeded by: Iskandar Ramis

Military service
- Allegiance: Indonesia
- Branch/service: Indonesian Army
- Years of service: 1965–199?
- Rank: Brigadier general

Usup Supriyadi is an Indonesian military officer and politician who served as the vice governor of Bengkulu from 1990 to 1996.

== Career ==
Supriyadi graduated from the National Military Academy in 1965. He gradually rose through the ranks of the Indonesian Army until he became a colonel. He was assigned to Irian Jaya (now Papua), where he became the assistant for operations in the local military command. After about a few years serving in Irian Jaya, he was transferred to Bengkulu and became the commander of Bengkulu's military area on 5 December 1989.

On 21 November 1990, Supriyadi was installed as the vice governor of Bengkulu, replacing Razie Jachya who became the province's governor. His office was temporarily held by the commander of the South Sumatra Regional Military Command until February 1991. Sometime during his term as vice governor, Supriyadi received a promotion to the rank of brigadier general. He was replaced by Iskandar Ramis on 9 January 1996.
