= Robert Christian Avé-Lallemant =

German physician

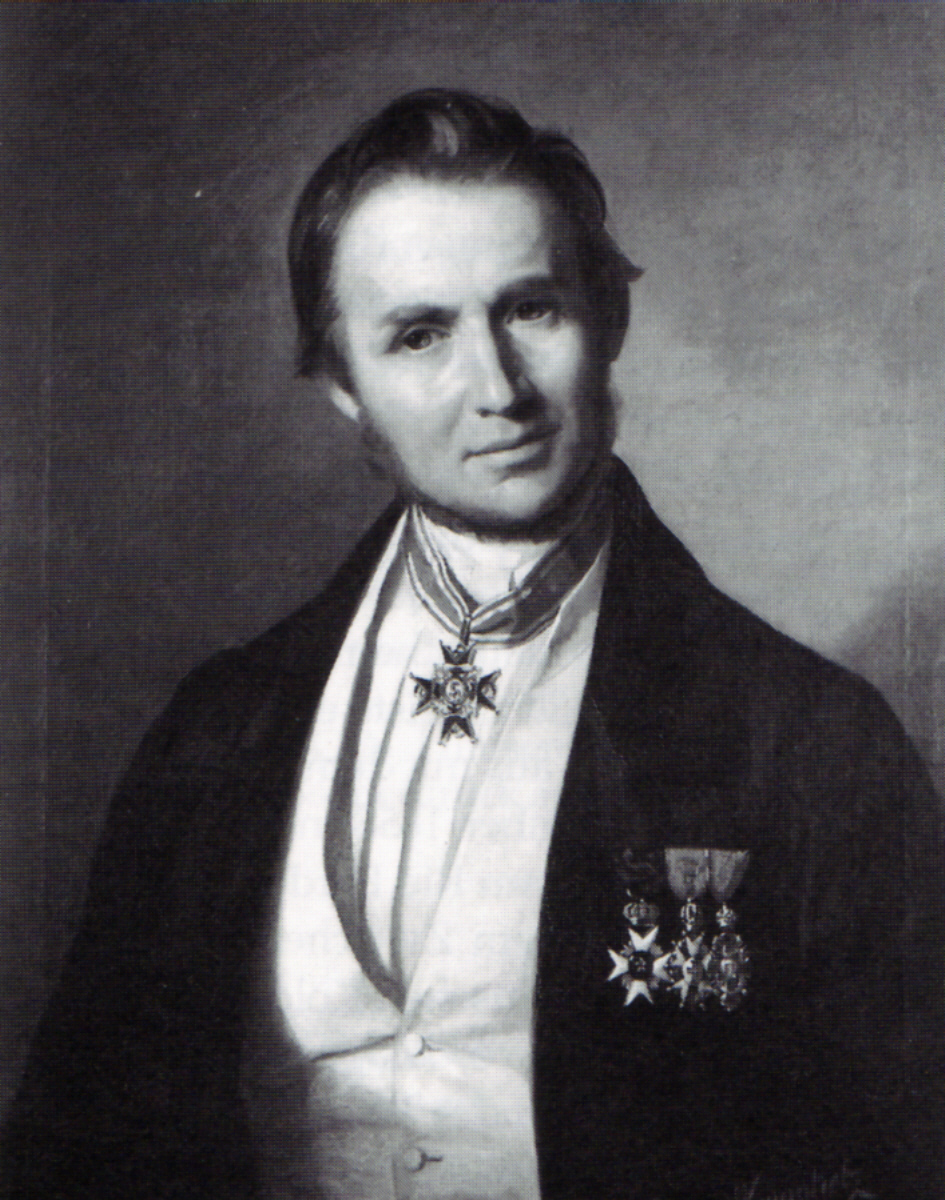
- Portrait of Avé-Lallemant by Ferdinand Krumholz, 1851
- Born: Robert Christian Barthold Avé-Lallemant; July 25, 1812; Lubeck, Bouches-de-l'Elbe, First French Empire
- Died: October 10, 1884 (aged 72); Lübeck, Province of Schleswig-Holstein, German Empire
- Other name: Christoph Berthold
- Education: Kiel University
- Relatives: Theodor Avé-Lallemant

Robert Christian Barthold Avé-Lallemant (25 July 1812 – 10 October 1884) was a German medical doctor and explorer who was a native of Lübeck. He was a brother to criminologist Friedrich Christian Benedict Avé-Lallemant (1809–1892) and music critic Theodor Avé-Lallemant (1806–1890).

He earned his medical doctorate from the University of Kiel, and in 1836 relocated to Brazil, where he subsequently became director of a sanatorium for yellow fever patients in Rio de Janeiro. In 1855 he returned to Germany, and enlisted as ship's doctor for the Austrian Novara expedition with a special recommendation from Alexander von Humboldt. After the SMS Novara had crossed the Atlantic Ocean to South America in 1857, Avé-Lallemant disembarked in Rio de Janeiro, leaving the expedition. Here he found work as a physician at the Fremdenhospital, but soon afterwards began scientific exploration of the country's interior. During his second time in Brazil. he spent approximately two years performing extensive exploration of the country, having the support of Emperor Pedro II.

In 1859 he returned to Lübeck, where he practiced medicine and became the author of numerous books. He published several books on his experiences in Brazil, including two major works; Reise durch Süd-Brasilien im Jahre 1858 (Journey through Southern Brazil in 1858) and Reise durch Nord-Brasilien im Jahre 1859 (Journey through Northern Brazil in 1859). In 1882 he published a book on the life of 17th century polymath Joachim Jungius, titled Das Leben des Dr. med. Joachim Jungius 1587–1657.
