= Helmi Hasan =

Indonesian politician

- ꥁꥉꤾ꥓ꤸꥇ ꥁꤼꥐ
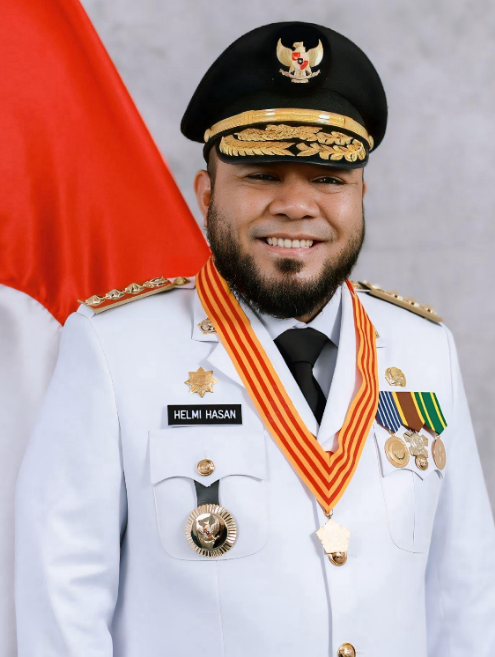

11th Governor of Bengkulu
- Incumbent
- Assumed office 20 February 2025
- President: Prabowo Subianto
- Deputy: Mian
- Preceded by: Rohidin Mersyah; Rosjonsyah (acting)

14th Mayor of Bengkulu
- In office 24 September 2018 – 24 September 2023
- Governor: Rohidin Mersyah
- Preceded by: Budiman Ismaun (acting)
- Succeeded by: Dedy Wahyudi
- In office 21 January 2013 – 21 January 2018
- Governor: Junaidi Hamsyah; Suhajar Diantoro (acting); Ridwan Mukti; Rohidin Mersyah (acting)
- Preceded by: Ahmad Kanedi
- Succeeded by: Budiman Ismaun (acting)

Member of the Bengkulu Regional House of Representatives
- In office 2009–2013

Member of the Bengkulu City Regional House of Representatives
- In office 2004–2009

Personal details
- Born: 29 November 1979 (age 46) Lampung, Indonesia
- Party: PAN
- Other political affiliations: KIM Plus (2024–present)
- Relatives: Zulkifli Hasan (brother)
- Education: University of Bengkulu

Helmi Hasan (Rejang: ꥁꥉꤾ꥓ꤸꥇ ꥁꤼꥐ; born 29 November 1979) is an Indonesian politician from the National Mandate Party (PAN) who is the 11th governor of Bengkulu, serving since February 2025. He had previously served as the 14th mayor of the city of Bengkulu between 2013 and 2023.

== Early life ==
Hasan was born in Lampung in 1979 as the youngest of six children, and he went to high school in East Jakarta. He studied economics at the University of Bengkulu, during which he was involved in the Muslim Students' Association, and he joined the National Mandate Party (PAN).

== Career ==
By 2004, Hasan had been elected to Bengkulu's City Council. Within PAN, he became the secretary of the provincial office by 2005, and its chairman by 2010. He was further elected into Bengkulu's provincial DPRD following the 2009 legislative election. At the provincial body, he was a deputy speaker.

In 2012, Hasan ran for Bengkulu's mayoral election with the support of PAN, Golkar, Gerindra, PNBK, and Demokrat. He was elected mayor after defeating the incumbent mayor Ahmad Kanedi by winning 75,058 (51.46%) votes. He was sworn into office on 21 January the following year. He was made a suspect of graft, but his suspect status was dismissed by a court decision in 2015.

Hasan secured reelection following the 2018 local elections and was sworn in for a second term on 24 September 2018. Between January and September, the post was held by Budiman Ismaun as an ad interim mayor. He ran in the 2020 gubernatorial elections for Bengkulu but lost to incumbent Rohidin Mersyah. He submitted his resignation as mayor in July 2023 in order to run as a legislative candidate for the House of Representatives in the 2024 election, although as the registration date was officially after the end of his tenure on 24 September 2023, his term was unaffected. He eventually did not run as a legislative candidate.

Later in 2024, he instead ran again for governor. He again ran against Mersyah, who was arrested several days prior to the election, and Hasan won the election with 616,469 votes (55.1%).

As governor, in June 2025 Hasan announced that Bengkulu's civil servants would be prohibited from divorcing prior to "mediation" by the governor.

== Family ==
Hasan is married to Khairunnisa Helmi and the couple has four children. His elder brother Zulkifli Hasan is also a politician who served as the Speaker of the People's Consultative Assembly between 2014 and 2019, with two other of his siblings holding political offices in Lampung. He was sworn in as governor on 20 February 2025.

== Honours ==
- Lencana Melati Gerakan Pramuka (Badge of Melati)
- Lencana Darma Bakti (Badge of Darma Melati)
- Manggala Karya Kencana (Medal of National Population and Family Planning)
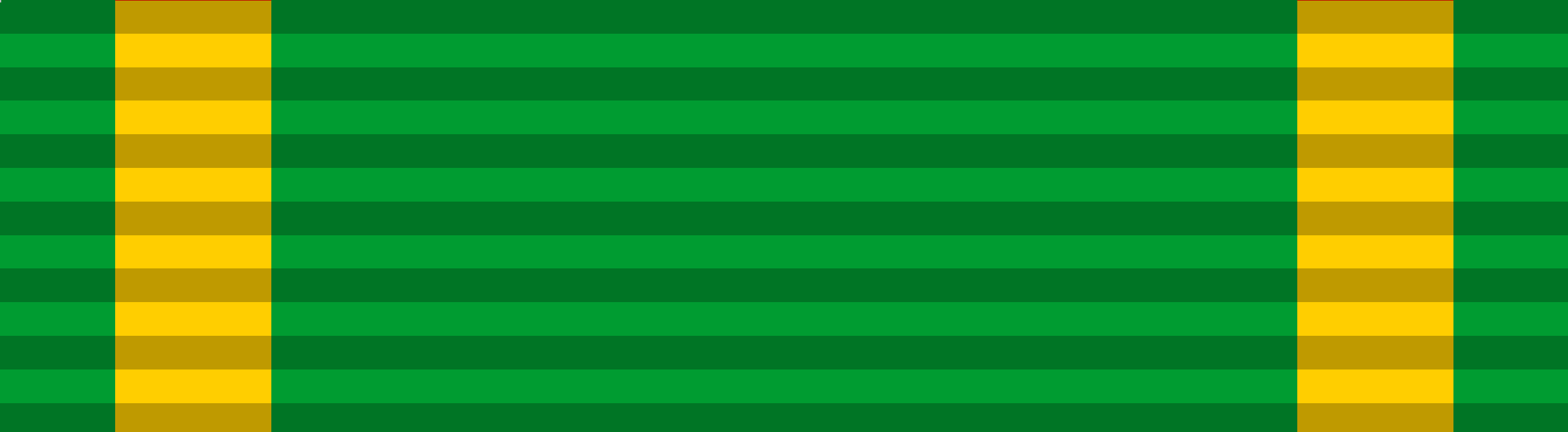
- Lencana Emas Jasa Bakti Koperasi dan Usaha Kecil dan Menengah (Gold Badge of Service for Cooperatives and Small and Medium Enterprises)
