= Chalik Effendi =

Indonesian politician of South Sumatra (1943/44–2010)

Mayor of Bengkulu
- In office 2002–2007
- Preceded by: Chairul Amri Zakaria
- Succeeded by: Ahmad Kanedi

Personal details
- Born: 1943 or 1944 South Ogan Komering Ulu, South Sumatra, Indonesia
- Died: 28 May 2010 (aged 66) South Ogan Komering Ulu

Chalik Effendi was an Indonesian politician who was mayor of Bengkulu between 2002 and 2007.

== Career ==
He originated from South Ogan Komering Ulu Regency, today in South Sumatra. For a time, he became a bureaucrat in South Sumatra, serving as head of the province's revenue office and later mining department, before moving the Bengkulu where he also headed the mining department and later social department of the provincial government.

Effendi was elected mayor of the city of Bengkulu in 2002 by the municipal legislature. In 2004, he was accused of graft (by inflating a housing project's value) and bribery (to municipal councillors during his election). By late 2004, the case was handed over to prosecutors who commenced an investigation, but an incident saw the home of the chief prosecutor of Bengkulu set on fire by arsonists, and Effendi was made a suspect for masterminding the attack. Another corruption case occurred between 2005 and 2007 regarding the construction expenses for district and kelurahan offices, which saw several of Effendi's subordinates arrested. Regardless, by 2010, Effendi had not been arrested, and due to him running for office as regent of his home region of South Ogan Komering Ulu the arrest was postponed.

He died in his home village during the campaigning period for the regency election on 28 May 2010 at the age of 66, and was buried in Palembang.
