= Hans Avé Lallemant =

University teacher and researcher of geology

Hans G. Avé Lallemant (2 May 1938 – 14 November 2016) was a Dutch-born American geologist. He was a professor of Earth Sciences at Rice University.

== Career ==
Avé Lallemant was born on 2 May 1938 in Bengkulu, then in the Dutch East Indies. He completed his university education in the Netherlands, obtaining a BA in geology from Leiden University in 1960, an MA in 1964, and finally his PhD in 1967.

Avé Lallemant then moved to the United States where he was a postdoctoral fellow at Yale University for three years. In 1970 he became an assistant professor at Rice University, four years later he became an associate professor at the same university. Avé Lallemant obtained U.S. citizenship in 1980. In 1981 he became a full professor of Earth Sciences at Rice University. Avé Lallemant retired in 2006.

In the 1970s, he experimentally constrained the high temperature rheology of olivine-rich rocks, with implications for mantle flow. He was an expert on transpressional and transtensional tectonics in the North American Cordillera and in the Caribbean. Based on field observations, he proposed a model for the exhumation of high pressure rocks in subduction zones through transtension.

Avé Lallemant became a corresponding member of the Royal Netherlands Academy of Arts and Sciences in 1987. He died on 14 November 2016, aged 78.
