= Rahmadi Nugraha =

Indonesian footballer

Rahmadi nugraha
Personal information
- Date of birth: 18 February 1986 (age 40)
- Place of birth: Indonesia
- Height: 1.74 m (5 ft 8 1/2 in)
- Position: Defender

Senior career*
Years	Team	Apps	(Gls)
2007–2010	Persiraja Banda Aceh	23	(1)
2007	→ PSM Makassar (loan)	0	(0)
2010–2012	PSMS Medan (ISL)	50	(1)
2013	PSAP Sigli	21	(1)
2014–2015	PSMS Medan	12	(0)
- * Club domestic league appearances and goals as of 1 April 2014

Rahmad (born on 18 February 1986) is an Indonesian former footballer.
