= Ahmad Kanedi =

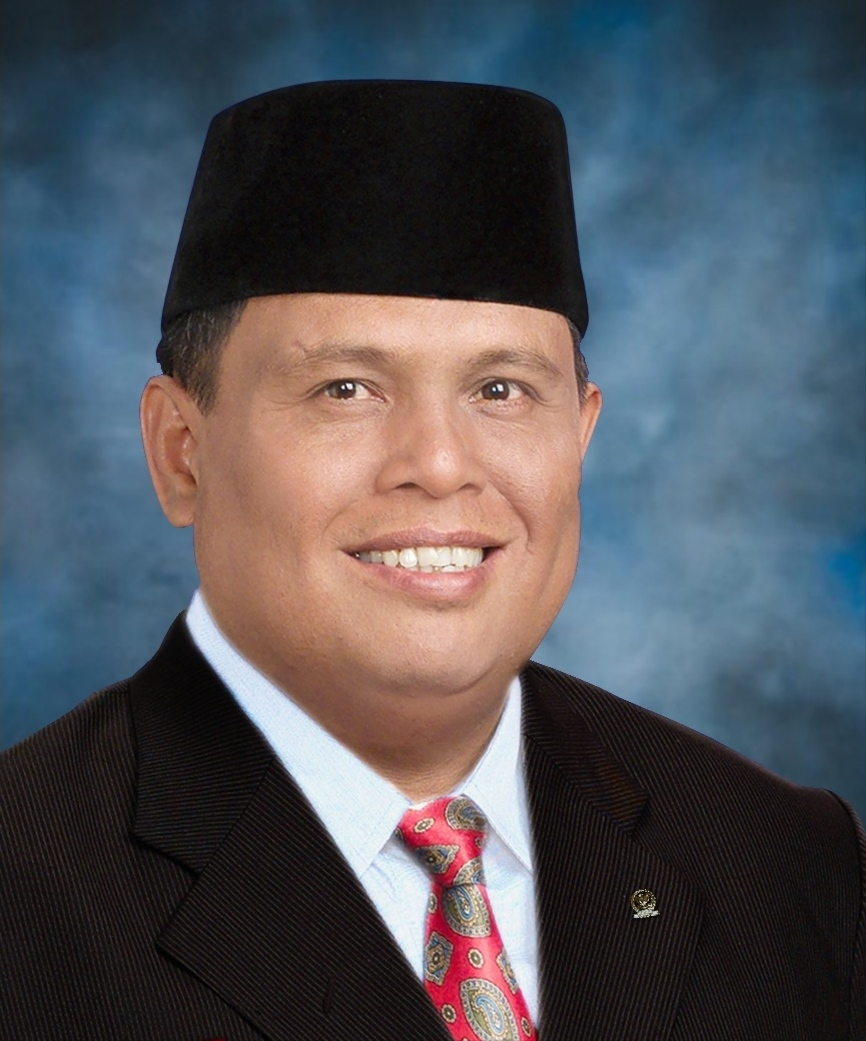

Senator for Bengkulu
- Incumbent
- Assumed office 1 October 2014

Mayor of Bengkulu
- In office 2007–2012
- Preceded by: Chalik Effendi
- Succeeded by: Helmi Hasan

Member of Bengkulu DPRD
- In office 1999–2002

Personal details
- Born: 24 December 1961 (age 64) Bengkulu, Indonesia

Ahmad Kanedi (born 24 December 1961) is an Indonesian politician who is currently a member of the Regional Representative Council, representing Bengkulu. He was the mayor of the city of Bengkulu between 2007 and 2012.

== Career ==
Kanedi was born in Bengkulu on 24 December 1961 and he studied law at the University of Bengkulu, obtaining his master's degree from there. He is of Minangkabau descent.

Between 1999 and 2002, he served as a legislator in Bengkulu's Regional People's Representative Council (DPRD). He won in Bengkulu city's mayoral election in 2007. However, he lost his 2012 reelection to Helmi Hasan, winning 70,812 (48.54%) votes.

He ran as a senator representing Bengkulu in the 2014 legislative election and secured a seat, winning the most votes among other senatorial candidates from the province. Kanedi was suspect in a graft case, but his suspect status was cancelled in 2015.

Kanedi was reelected for a second term in the 2019 election. He ran for a third term in 2024, but failed to win a seat.
