= Tubei =

District of Lebong, Bengkulu

- District
- Interactive map of Tubei
- Coordinates: 3°9′0.5839″S 102°9′30.8513″E
- Country: Indonesia
- Province: Bengkulu
- Regency: Lebong
- District seat: Tanjung Agung

Area
  - Total: 40.71 km^{2} (15.72 sq mi)

Population (mid 2023)
  - Total: 7,994
  - Density: 196.4/km^{2} (508.6/sq mi)
- Time zone: UTC+7 (WIB)
- Postal code: 39266
- Villages: 8

Tubei is a district (kecamatan) in Lebong Regency, Bengkulu Province, Indonesia. As of mid 2023, it has a population of 7,994 people.

== Governance ==
=== Villages ===
Tubei consists of one urban village (kelurahan) and seven rural village (desa):

- Tanjung Agung ^{(k)}
- Sukau Datang
- Sukau Datang I
- Gunung Alam
- Tabeak Blau II
- Kota Baru Santan
- Tik Teleu
- Pelabai

== Climate ==
Climate data for Tubei (Meteorology, Climatology, and Geophysical Agency)
Month	Jan	Feb	Mar	Apr	May	Jun	Jul	Aug	Sep	Oct	Nov	Dec	Year
Mean daily maximum °C (°F)	30.0 (86.0)	30.5 (86.9)	31.0 (87.8)	31.5 (88.7)	32.0 (89.6)	31.5 (88.7)	31.0 (87.8)	30.5 (86.9)	30.0 (86.0)	30.5 (86.9)	31.0 (87.8)	30.5 (86.9)	30.8 (87.5)
Mean daily minimum °C (°F)	22.0 (71.6)	22.5 (72.5)	23.0 (73.4)	23.5 (74.3)	24.0 (75.2)	23.5 (74.3)	23.0 (73.4)	22.5 (72.5)	22.0 (71.6)	22.5 (72.5)	23.0 (73.4)	22.5 (72.5)	22.8 (73.1)
Average precipitation mm (inches)	300 (11.8)	280 (11.0)	260 (10.2)	240 (9.4)	220 (8.7)	200 (7.9)	180 (7.1)	200 (7.9)	220 (8.7)	240 (9.4)	260 (10.2)	280 (11.0)	2,880 (113.3)
Source: BMKG (Note: This forecast may change as weather conditions change)
