= Rahmadi =

Rahmadi is a name. People with the name include:

- Ridho Rahmadi
- Rahmadi Nugraha
