= University of Bengkulu =

Public university

- Universitas Bengkulu
- Motto: Conveying Better Future
- Type: Public university
- Established: 24 April 1982
- Affiliations: ASAIHL
- Rector: Prof. Dr. Indra Cahyadinata, S.P., M.Si.
- Location: Jl. WR Supratman, Kandang Limun, Bengkulu, Bengkulu, Bengkulu, Indonesia; 3°45′35″S 102°16′21″E
- Colors: Blue
- Nickname: Unib
- Website: www.unib.ac.id

University of Bengkulu (Indonesian: Universitas Bengkulu) is a public university in Bengkulu, Bengkulu, Indonesia. It was established on 24 April 1982. Its current rector is Prof. Dr. Indra Cahyadinata, S.P., M.Si.

== Schools ==
The university has 8 faculties:

1. Faculty of Teacher Training and Education
2. Faculty of Law
3. Faculty of Economics and Business
4. Faculty of Politics and Social Sciences
5. Faculty of Agriculture
6. School of Mathematics and Natural Sciences
7. Faculty of Engineering
8. Faculty of Medicine and Health Sciences
