= South Bengkulu Regency =

Regency in Bengkulu, Indonesia

Coordinates: 4.3500°S 103.0333°E

South Bengkulu Regency Kabupaten Bengkulu Selatan
- Regency
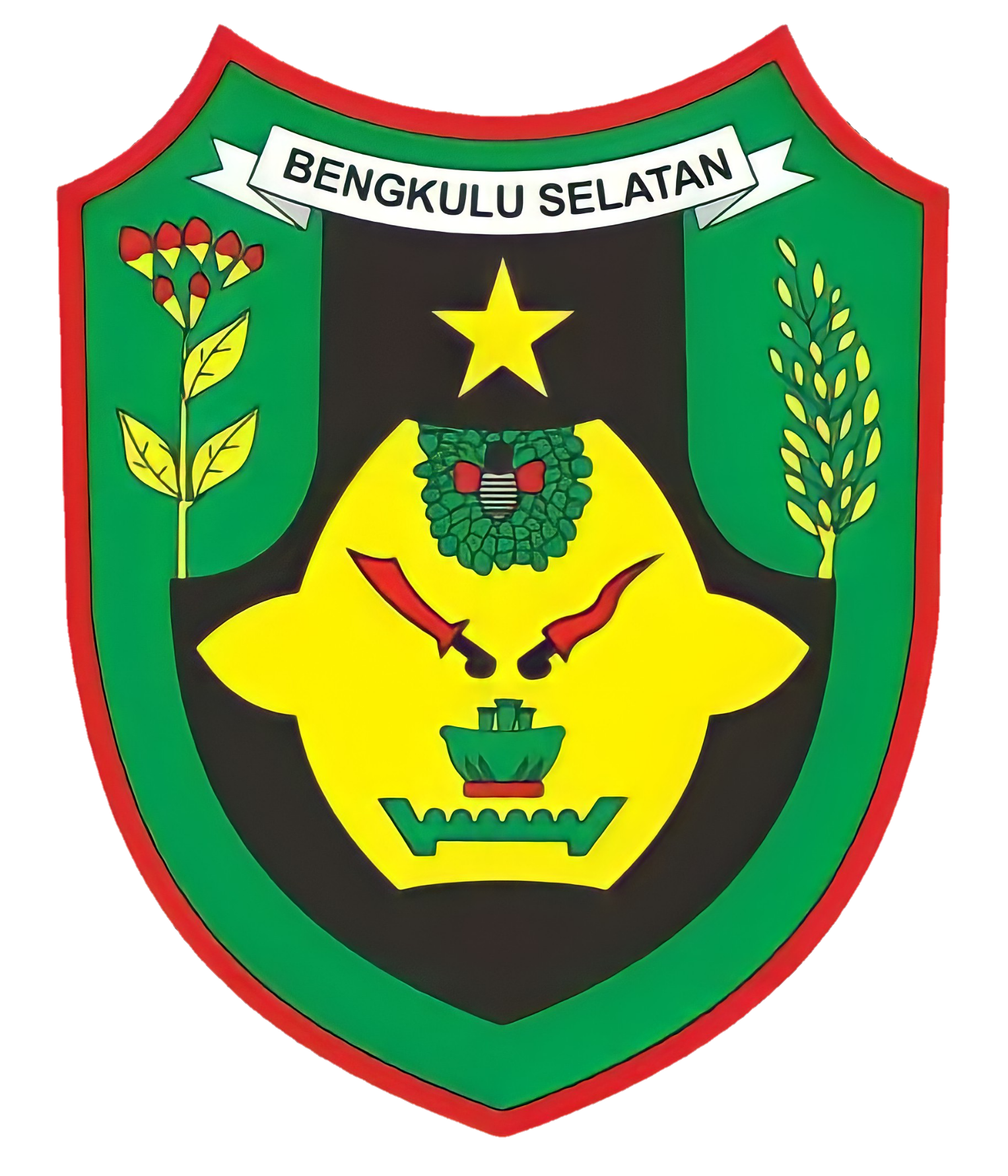
- Coat of arms
- Motto: "Sekundang Setungguan" Many Hands Make the Works Lighter
- Country: Indonesia
- Province: Bengkulu
- Regency seat: Manna

Government
  - Regent: Rifai Tajudin
  - Vice Regent: Yevri Sudianto

Area
  - Total: 1,219.91 km^{2} (471.01 sq mi)

Population (mid 2025 estimate)
  - Total: 175,126
  - Density: 143.556/km^{2} (371.810/sq mi)
- Time zone: UTC+7 (WIB)
- Website: http://www.bengkulu-selatan.go.id

South Bengkulu (Indonesian: Bengkulu Selatan) is a regency of Bengkulu Province, Indonesia, on the island of Sumatra. It originally comprised all of that part of Bengkulu Province situated to the southeast of the city of Bengkulu, but on 25 February 2003 this area was split into three parts, with the most southeastern districts split off to form a new Kaur Regency and the most northwestern districts (closer to Bengkulu city) split off to form a new Seluma Regency. The reduced South Bengkulu Regency now covers 1,219.91 km^{2}, and had a population of 142,940 at the 2010 Census and 166,249 at the 2020 Census; the official estimate as at mid 2025 was 175,126 (comprising 89,054 males and 86,072 females). The regency's administrative centre is the coastal town of Manna.

== Administrative districts ==
The Regency is divided into eleven districts (Indonesian: kecamatan), tabulated below with their areas and their populations at the 2010 Census and the 2020 Census, together with the official estimates as at mid 2025. The table also includes the location of the district administrative centres, the number of administrative villages in each district (totaling 142 rural desa and 16 urban kelurahan), and its post code.

| Kode Wilayah | Name of District (kecamatan) | Area in km^{2} | Pop'n Census 2010 | Pop'n Census 2020 | Pop'n estimate mid 2025 | Admin centre | No. of villages | Post code |
|---|---|---|---|---|---|---|---|---|
| 17.01.04 | Manna | 36.12 | 13,102 | 16,303 | 17,730 | Kayu Kunyit | 18 ^{(a)} | 38511 |
| 17.01.05 | Kota Manna (Manna town) | 35.30 | 26,880 | 31,807 | 33,750 | Ibul | 11 ^{(b)} | 38511: 38513 |
| 17.01.01 | Kedurang | 234.55 | 10,275 | 11,990 | 12,640 | Tanjung Alam | 19 | 38553 |
| 17.01.10 | Bunga Mas | 36.32 | 5,804 | 6,828 | 7,230 | Gindosuli | 10 | 38511 |
| 17.01.11 | Pasar Manna | 7.40 | 17,514 | 17,954 | 17,770 | Pasar Bawah | 9 ^{(c)} | 38513: 38518 |
| 17.01.07 | Kedurang Ilir | 55.16 | 7,212 | 8,944 | 9,710 | Lubuk Ladung | 12 | 38554 |
| 17.01.02 | Seginim | 51.27 | 15,069 | 17,174 | 17,900 | Pasar Baru | 22 ^{(d)} | 38552 |
| 17.01.08 | Air Nipis | 205.36 | 10,302 | 12,441 | 13,330 | Suka Negeri | 10 | 38571 |
| 17.01.03 | Pino | 86.04 | 11,262 | 12,775 | 13,280 | Masat | 16 ^{(e)} | 38570 |
| 17.01.06 | Pino Raya | 223.50 | 18,303 | 21,938 | 23,420 | Pasar Pino | 21 | 38572 |
| 17.01.09 | Ulu Manna | 185.72 | 7,217 | 8,095 | 8,370 | Simpang Pino | 10 | 38573 |
| | Totals | 1,219.91 | 142,940 | 166,249 | 175,126 | Manna | 158 | |

Notes: (a) including the kelurahan of Kayu Kunyit.
(b) comprising 6 kelurahan (Gunung Ayu, Ibul, Kampung Baru, Kota Medan, Padang Kapuk and Pasar Baru) and 5 desa.
(c) comprising 7 kelurahan (Belakang Gedung, Gunung Mesir, Ketapang Besar, Padang Sialang, Pasar Bawah, Pasar Mulia and Tanjung Mulia) and 2 desa.
(d) including the kelurahan of Tanjung Menang. (e) including the kelurahan of Masat.
