= Manna (city) =

- Location in Bengkulu and Indonesia Manna (Indonesia)
- Coordinates: 4°28′0.57″S 102°54′46.61″E
- Country: Indonesia
- Province: Bengkulu
- Regency: South Bengkulu Regency
- District: Kota Manna District
- Elevation: 115 ft (35 m)

Population (mid 2023 estimate)
  - Total: 32,900
- Time zone: UTC+7 (Indonesia Western Standard Time)

Manna is a town and the capital of South Bengkulu Regency in Bengkulu Province on the west coast of Sumatra, in Indonesia. Its population was 32,900 as at mid 2023.

== Climate ==
Manna has a tropical rainforest climate (Af) with heavy to very heavy rainfall year-round

Climate data for Manna
Month	Jan	Feb	Mar	Apr	May	Jun	Jul	Aug	Sep	Oct	Nov	Dec	Year
Mean daily maximum °C (°F)	31.1 (88.0)	31.5 (88.7)	31.6 (88.9)	31.8 (89.2)	31.9 (89.4)	31.7 (89.1)	31.5 (88.7)	31.4 (88.5)	31.3 (88.3)	31.2 (88.2)	31.1 (88.0)	30.8 (87.4)	31.4 (88.5)
Daily mean °C (°F)	26.6 (79.9)	26.8 (80.2)	26.9 (80.4)	27.1 (80.8)	27.1 (80.8)	26.8 (80.2)	26.4 (79.5)	26.4 (79.5)	26.6 (79.9)	26.6 (79.9)	26.6 (79.9)	26.4 (79.5)	26.7 (80.0)
Mean daily minimum °C (°F)	22.1 (71.8)	22.1 (71.8)	22.2 (72.0)	22.5 (72.5)	22.4 (72.3)	21.9 (71.4)	21.4 (70.5)	21.5 (70.7)	21.9 (71.4)	22.1 (71.8)	22.2 (72.0)	22.1 (71.8)	22.0 (71.7)
Average precipitation mm (inches)	240 (9.4)	243 (9.6)	256 (10.1)	222 (8.7)	199 (7.8)	159 (6.3)	179 (7.0)	286 (11.3)	386 (15.2)	443 (17.4)	419 (16.5)	347 (13.7)	3,379 (133)
Source: Climate-Data.org
