= Theodor Avé-Lallemant =

German musician and teacher (1805–1890)

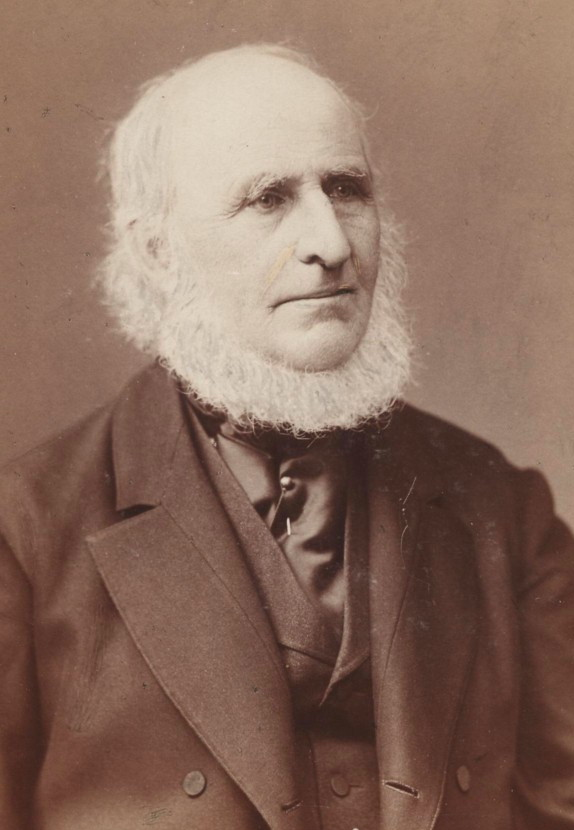
Theodor Avé-Lallemant

Johann Theodor Friedrich Avé-Lallemant (2 February 1806 in Magdeburg – 9 November 1890 in Hamburg) was a German musician and music teacher.

== Family and personal life ==
The son of a music teacher, Avé-Lallemant studied music (French horn, organ, and piano) from the age of nine, in Greifswald and Lübeck, before settling in Hamburg in 1828. Here he worked as a music teacher until 1874 and came to play a leading role in the Hanseatic city's music life. Thus, in 1838 he was appointed to the board of directors of the Philharmonic Society (Philharmonie), eventually becoming its chairman and director of concerts. In 1841, he organized the third North German Music Festival in Hamburg, the largest event of its kind in Germany, and in 1847 he was one of the founders of the "Hamburger Tonkünstlerverein" (Musicians' Association).

Avé-Lallemant married, in 1840, Wilhelmina of the Jauch family, the daughter of a wealthy Hamburg merchant. They had six children, and the godfathers of two of their sons were Robert Schumann and Johannes Brahms. Avé-Lallemant was also on friendly terms with other notable musicians, including Clara Schumann, Joseph Joachim, and Julius Stockhausen.

== Tchaikovsky and Avé-Lallemant ==
Pyotr Ilyich Tchaikovsky was introduced to Avé-Lallemant in January 1888 when the Russian composer arrived in Hamburg to conduct a concert of his own music at the Philharmonie. The concert, which featured the Serenade for String Orchestra, the Piano Concerto No. 1 (soloist Wassily Sapellnikoff), and the Theme and Variations from the Suite No. 3, took place on 8/20 January, and two days later Tchaikovsky, accompanied by his German publisher Daniel Rahter, called on Avé-Lallemant and spent a few hours at his house. The entry he made in his diary that evening reflects something of the cordial atmosphere in which those hours were spent : "After dinner visit to Avé-Lallemant. The old man touched me by his invitation nach Deutschland zu übersiedeln [to emigrate to Germany]", and Tchaikovsky would describe their conversation in more detail in the account of his concert tour which he wrote up a few months later in his Autobiographical Account of a Tour Abroad in the Year 1888 (Chapter XI):

First of all I should mention the chief director of the Philharmonic Society, the aged Herr Avé-Lallemant. This most venerable old man of over eighty paid me great attention and treated me with paternal affection. In spite of his age and frailness, as well as the long distance from his house, he attended my two rehearsals, the concert, and even Dr Bernuth's reception [after the concert]. In his extraordinary kindness he went so far as to request some photographs of me, which were to be taken by the best photographer in Hamburg. He even called on me to ask about this and arranged an appointment when I could pose for the photographer, as well as deciding on my behalf what size and format the photographs should be produced in. When I then visited this kindly old gentleman, who passionately loves music and who, as should be obvious to the reader, is quite free from that aversion which many old people have against everything that has been written in recent times, I had a very lengthy and interesting conversation with him.

Herr Avé-Lallemant openly confessed that there was a lot in those works of mine which had been performed in Hamburg that wasn't to his liking; that he could not stand my noisy instrumentation; that he hated some of the orchestral effects which I resorted to (especially with regard to the percussion), but that all the same he saw in me the makings of a good, truly German composer. Almost with tears in his eyes he exhorted me to leave Russia and to settle permanently in Germany, where the classical traditions and the general atmosphere of a higher culture would not fail to correct me and rid me of those deficiencies which he felt were easily accountable by the fact that I was born and grew up in a country which was still so unenlightened and backward when compared to Germany as regards progress.

Evidently, Herr Avé-Lallemant harbours a deep prejudice against Russia, and I tried as far as I could to mitigate his hostile feelings towards our country, which, incidentally, this venerable Russophobe did not actually express openly, but merely allowed to shine through in his words. We parted as great friends.

Tchaikovsky did not forget this meeting, and he decided to dedicate his next major work, the Symphony No. 5, which he embarked on and completed that summer, to Avé-Lallemant. He asked his German publisher, Rahter, to find out whether Avé-Lallemant would accept such a dedication, and this is what Rahter reported in a letter to the composer on 23 July/4 August 1888: "I have seen Herr Avé-Lallemant here [in Hamburg]; he told me that he had written to you saying that he considers himself too insignificant to accept the intended distinction. However, he will be very glad about it, so just go ahead with your plan". In another letter two weeks later, Rahter informed Tchaikovsky of how the dedicatee wished his name to be written on the title-page of the score of the Fifth Symphony: "Herrn Theodor Avé-Lallement in Hamburg" [To Herr Theodor Avé-Lallemant in Hamburg]. A few months later, however, Tchaikovsky briefly considered dedicating his new work to the Royal Philharmonic Society in London instead — evidently for pragmatic reasons, since negotiations were underway for him to visit London during his next concert tour to Western Europe in the spring of 1889 and he seems to have intended to conduct his new symphony in the British capital. Rahter wrote to Tchaikovsky on 22 September/4 October 1888 that, in his view, Avé-Lallemant would not be offended by this, since he too would understand that it was a necessary gesture to secure the invitation from the Royal Philharmonic Society. Rahter added that Tchaikovsky could always dedicate some other work to Avé-Lallemant later on. This change of plan was but fleeting, though, and the original dedication of the Fifth Symphony to Avé-Lallemant remained in place: it was with this dedication that the full score was published by Jurgenson in Moscow later that year.

Unfortunately, ill health prevented the dedicatee from hearing Tchaikovsky conduct the new work at the Hamburg Philharmonie on 3/15 March 1889. He wrote to the composer on the morning of the concert: "Dear and esteemed Sir and friend! My cold has unfortunately got so worse that I shall have to keep to my room, and perhaps even to my bed, for several days, which means that I can also not attend the concert! How cruel this is for me, since you have become very dear to me not just as a composer, but also as the splendid person you are. I must therefore call out to you a written Grüß Gott, and, if He grants it, Auf Wiedersehen [Till we meet!]". The Fifth Symphony was received very warmly at Tchaikovsky's concert in Hamburg, dispelling his earlier doubts about this work. However, as Modest Tchaikovsky observed in his biography of the composer: "The agreeable impression of that evening was slightly clouded by the fact that Avé-Lallemant, to whom the symphony is dedicated, was unable to attend the concert due to ill health. For Pyotr Ilyich had set such store on his being there, he had been so keen to know his opinion! Before the concert the old man sent a letter with many blessings and wishing him success, but he did not get to hear the symphony itself". It seems very likely that Tchaikovsky did not meet Avé-Lallemant at all during his brief stay in Hamburg on that occasion (already on 4/16 March, the day after the concert, he left for Hanover), but he did keep his promise of providing Avé-Lallemant's wife with a portrait photograph of himself — it was in fact one of the prints made, at Avé-Lallemant's instigation, by the Hamburg photographer E. Bieber during Tchaikovsky's previous visit to the city.

Theodor Avé-Lallemant died on 9 November 1890 after having devoted more than fifty years of his life to promoting the work of the Hamburg Philharmonic Society. Rahter reported this sad loss to Tchaikovsky in a letter two days later: "Good Herr Avé-Lallemant has died. The most distinguishing event in his life was in any case that which put his name on your 5th Symphony. He accorded you his full sympathy".

One letter from Tchaikovsky to Theodor Avé-Lallemant has survived, dating from 1889:

- Letter 4/16 March 1889, from Hamburg.

== Bibliography ==
- Avé-Lallemant, Benedikt: Rückblicke auf das Dritte Norddeutsche Musikfest zu Hamburg, Lübeck 1841
- Avé-Lallemant, Theodor: Rückerinnerungen eines alten Musikanten, als Manuskript gedruckt Hamburg 1878
- Avé-Lallemant, Peter (Hrsg.): Chronik der Familie Avé-Lallemant. Zusammengestellt von Hans Avé-Lallemant, Typoscript in 30 Exemplaren 1948
- Feddersen, Peter: Tschaikowsky in Hamburg. Eine Dokumentation, Cajkovskij-Studien Band 8, Mainz 2006 (u.a. S. 256 Porträt Theodor Avé-Lallemant und Frau Wilhelmine geb. Jauch, S. 257 Porträt Peter Tschaikowsky von 1888 mit Widmung „an Frau Avé-Lallemant“)
- Fuchs, Charles (Hrsg.): Erinnerungen an das dritte Norddeutsche Musik-Fest in Hamburg im July 1841, Hamburg 1841
- Hofmann, Kurt: Theodor Avé-Lallemant, in: Appel, Bernhard, R. (Hrsg.): Musikhandschriften und Briefe aus dem Familienarchiv Avé-Lallemant, (Hrsg. von der Kulturstiftung der Länder in Verbindung mit dem) Brahms-Institut an der Musikhochschule Lübeck, Berlin 2001 (= Patrimonia 197)
- Hofmann, Kurt: Johannes Brahms in Hamburg, Reinbek 1986
- Struck, Michael: Manuskripte mit Frage- und Ausrufezeichen. Die Clara Wieck zugeschriebenen Werke aus dem Familienarchiv Avé-Lallemant, in: Appel, Bernhard, R. (Hrsg.): Musikhandschriften und Briefe aus dem Familienarchiv Avé-Lallemant, (Hrsg. von der Kulturstiftung der Länder in Verbindung mit dem) Brahms-Institut an der Musikhochschule Lübeck, Berlin 2001 (= Patrimonia 197)
- Lührsen, Conrad Nikolaus: Die Familie Avé-Lallemant und ihre Töchternachkommen, Deutsches Familienarchiv (DFA) Band 23, Neustadt an der Aisch 1963, S. 205–243
