= Kaur Regency =

Regency in Bengkulu, Indonesia

Coordinates: 4.5893°S 103.4168°E

Kaur Regency Kabupaten Kaur
- Regency
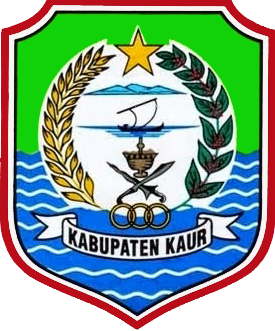
- Coat of arms

- Country: Indonesia
- Province: Bengkulu
- Regency seat: Bintuhan

Government
  - Regent: Gusril Pausi
  - Vice Regent: Abdul Hamid

Area
  - Total: 2,608.85 km^{2} (1,007.28 sq mi)

Population (mid 2025 estimate)
  - Total: 137,064
  - Density: 52.5381/km^{2} (136.073/sq mi)
- Time zone: UTC+7 (WIB)

Kaur is the southernmost regency of Bengkulu Province, Indonesia, on the west coast of the island of Sumatra. It was created on 25 February 2003 from what were formerly the southeastern districts of the South Bengkulu Regency. It has an area of 2,608.85 km^{2} and had a population of 107,899 at the 2010 Census and 126,551 at the 2020 Census; the official estimate as at mid 2025 was 137,064 (comprising 70,450 males and 66,614 females). The regency seat is at the town of Bintuhan.

== Administrative districts ==
The Regency is divided into fifteen districts (Indonesian: kecamatan), tabulated below with their areas and their populations at the 2010 Census and the 2020 Census, together with the official estimates as at mid 2025. The table also includes the locations of the district administrative centres, and the number of villages in each district (totalling 192 rural desa and 3 urban kelurahan), and its post code.

Kode Wilayah	Name of District (kecamatan)	Area in km^{2}	Pop'n Census 2010	Pop'n Census 2020	Pop'n estimate mid 2025	Admin centre	No. of villages	Post code
17.04.07	Nasal	562.23	15,166	16,600	17,397	Merpas	17	38964
17.04.06	Maje	495.45	11,900	14,200	15,560	Linau	19	38965
17.04.05	Kaur Selatan (South Kaur)	43.08	14,043	16,800	18,119	Bantar Bintuhan	19 ^{(a)}	38963
17.04.12	Tetap	136.11	5,859	6,900	7,593	Tetap	12	38968
17.04.04	Kaur Tengah (Central Kaur)	24.80	4,365	5,100	5,233	Tanjung Iman	9 ^{(b)}	38961
17.04.10	Luas	126.92	4,822	5,600	5,852	Benua Ratu	12	38960
17.04.11	Muara Sahung	316.64	5,445	6,700	7,299	Ulak Lebar	7	38966
17.04.01	Kinal	82.76	4,268	4,800	5,326	Tanjung Baru	14	38962
17.04.08	Semidang Gumai	57.65	5,398	6,500	7,185	Mentiring	13	38967
17.04.02	Tanjung Kemuning	87.63	10,575	13,400	14,706	Tanjung Kemuning	20	38955
17.04.09	Kelam Tengah (Central Kelam)	38.74	6,189	7,200	7,798	Rigangan	13	38954
17.04.03	Kaur Utara (North Kaur)	37.69	6,422	7,600	8,278	Simpang Tiga	11 ^{(c)}	38956
17.04.14	Padang Guci Hilir	119.92	3,586	3,800	4,261	Gunung Kaya	9	38958
17.04.13	Lungkang Kule	47.58	3,232	3,500	3,858	Sukananti	9	38957
17.04.15	Padang Guci Hulu	431.65	6,629	7,800	8,599	Bungin Tambun	11	38959
	Totals	2,608.85	107,899	126,551	137,064	Bintuhan	195	

Note: (a) including the kelurahan of Bantar Bintuhan. (b) including the kelurahan of Tanjung Iman.
(c) including the kelurahan of Simpang Tiga.
