= Bengkulu =

Province in Sumatra, Indonesia

- Province
- Province of Bengkulu; Provinsi Bengkulu
- Coat of arms
- Nickname: Bumi Rafflesia "Land of Rafflesia"
- Motto: Sekundang Setungguan Seio Sekato (Central Malay) "Many Hands Make the Works Lighter"
- Bengkulu in Indonesia
- Interactive map of Bengkulu
- Country: Indonesia
- Region: Sumatra (Western Indonesia)
- Established: 18 November 1968
- Capital and largest city: Bengkulu

Government
  - Body: Bengkulu Provincial Government
  - Governor: Helmi Hasan (PAN)
  - Vice Governor: Mian
  - Legislature: Bengkulu Regional House of Representatives (DPRD)

Area
  - Total: 20,122.21 km^{2} (7,769.23 sq mi)
  - Rank: 28th in Indonesia
- Highest elevation (Mount Patah): 2,852 m (9,357 ft)

Population (mid 2025 estimate)
  - Total: 2,138,044
  - Rank: 26th in Indonesia
  - Density: 106.2529/km^{2} (275.1939/sq mi)

Demographics
  - Ethnic groups (2009): 60% Rejangese; 22% Javanese; 18% Lembak/Serawai; 5% Chinese; 4.3% Minangkabau; 13% other
  - Religion: 95% Islam; 4% Christianity; 1% other
  - Languages and dialects: Indonesian (official); Rejangese, Bengkulu Malay, Serawai, Lembak, etc.
- Time zone: UTC+7 (Indonesia Western Time)
- HDI (2024): ▲0.749 (16th) – high
- Website: bengkuluprov.go.id

Bengkulu (Indonesian pronunciation: [bəŋˈkulu], Rejang: ꤷꥍꥏꤰꥈꤾꥈ), historically known as Bencoolen (Dutch: Benkoelen), is a province of Indonesia. It is located on the southwest coast of Sumatra. It was formed on 18 November 1968 by separating out the area of the historic Bencoolen Residency from the province of South Sumatra under Law No. 9 of 1967 and was finalized by Government Regulation No. 20 of 1968. Spread over 20,122.21 km^{2}, its land area is comparable to the European country of Slovenia or the U.S. state of Massachusetts or Ivanovo Oblast and it is bordered by the provinces of West Sumatra to the north, Jambi to the northeast, Lampung to the southeast, and South Sumatra to the east, and by the Indian Ocean to the northwest, south, southwest, and west.

Bengkulu is the 28th largest province by area; it is divided into nine regencies and the city of Bengkulu, the capital and the only independent city. Bengkulu is also the 26th largest province by population in Indonesia, with 1,715,518 inhabitants at the 2010 Census and 2,010,670 at the 2020 Census; the official estimate as of mid 2025 was 2,138,044 (comprising 1,091,256 males and 1,046,788 females). According to a release by Badan Pusat Statistik, it has the eleventh highest Human Development Index among the provinces, with a score of about 0.744 in 2013. By 2014, the province is positioned 28th highest in gross domestic product and 20th highest in life expectancy, 70.35 years.

Bengkulu also includes offshore Mega Island and Enggano Island in the Indian Ocean. Bengkulu has 525 kilometres of coastline along the Indian Ocean on its western side, from Dusun Baru Pelokan in Mukomuko Regency to Tebing Nasal in Kaur Regency. Bengkulu has many natural resources such as coal and gold, and has big and potential geothermal resources. However, it is less developed than other provinces in Sumatra.

== Etymology ==
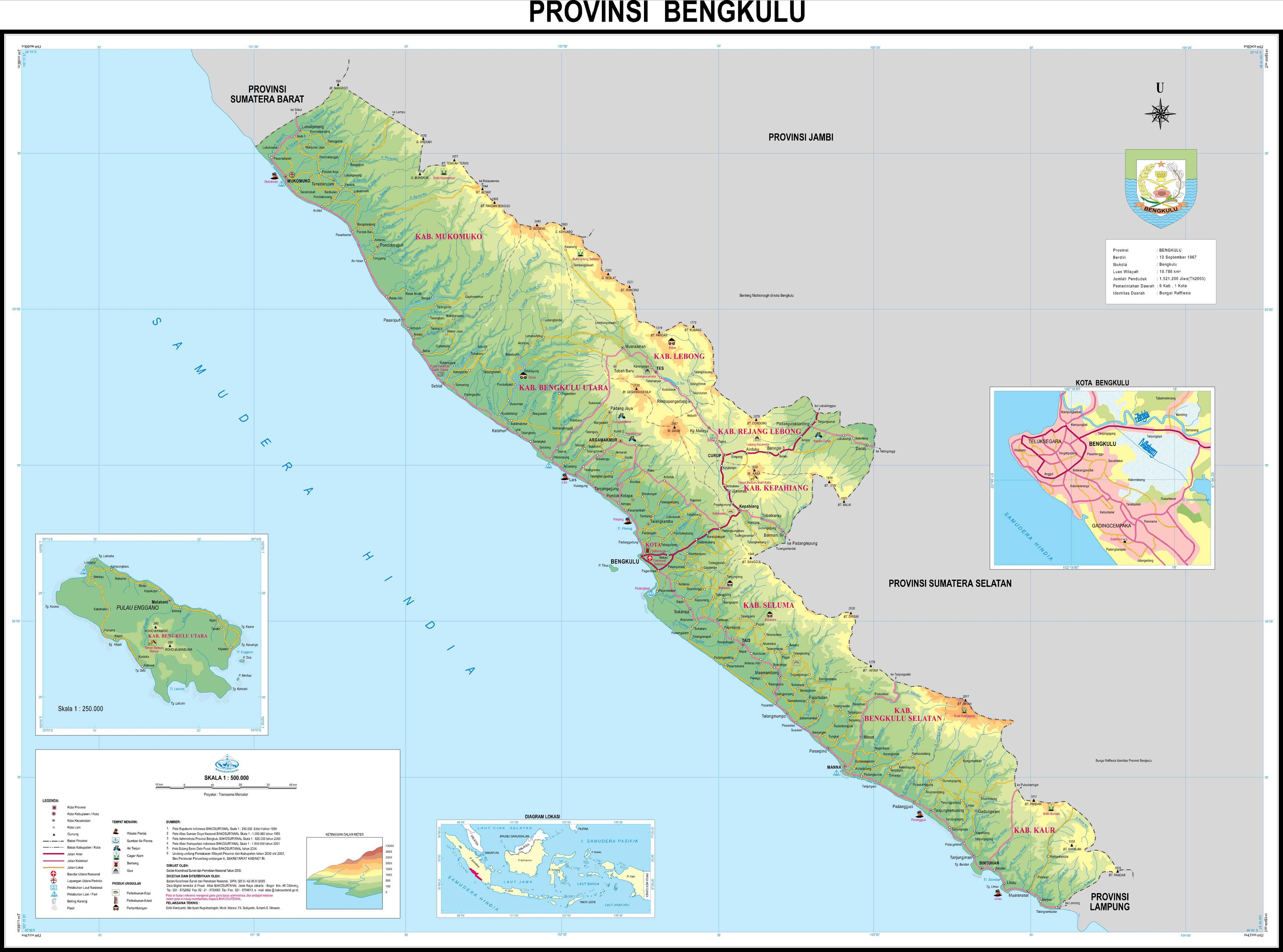
Map of Bengkulu

Traditional sources suggest that the name Bengkulu or Bangkahulu is derived from the words bangkai and hulu which means 'carcasses upstream'. According to a story, there was once a war between small kingdoms in Bengkulu, resulting in many casualties from both sides in the streams of Bengkulu. These casualties soon rotted as they were not buried, lying in river streams. This etymology is similar to the story of a war between the Majapahit Empire and the Pagaruyung Kingdom in Padang Sibusuk, an area once ruled by the Dharmasraya empire, which also derives the name "Padang Sibusuk" from casualties rotting on the battlefield. During the European colonial era, the region was known as Bencoolen or British Bencoolen.

== History ==
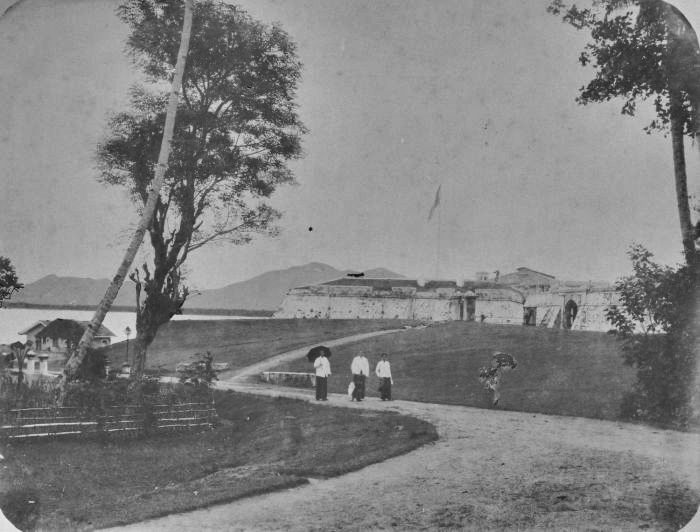
European women dressed in sarongs in front of Fort Marlborough (early 20th century)

The region was subject to the Buddhist Srivijaya empire in the 8th century. The Shailendra Kingdom and Singosari Kingdom succeeded the Srivijaya but it is unclear whether they spread their influence over Bengkulu. The Majapahit also had little influence over Bengkulu. There were only few smalls 'kedatuan' based on ethnicity such as in Sungai Serut, Selebar, Pat Petulai, Balai Buntar, Sungai Lemau, Sekiris, Gedung Agung and Marau Riang. It became a vassal region of the Banten Sultanate (from Western Java) in the early 15th century and since the 17th century was ruled by Minangkabau's Inderapura Sultanate (today's in Pesisir Selatan, West Sumatra Province).

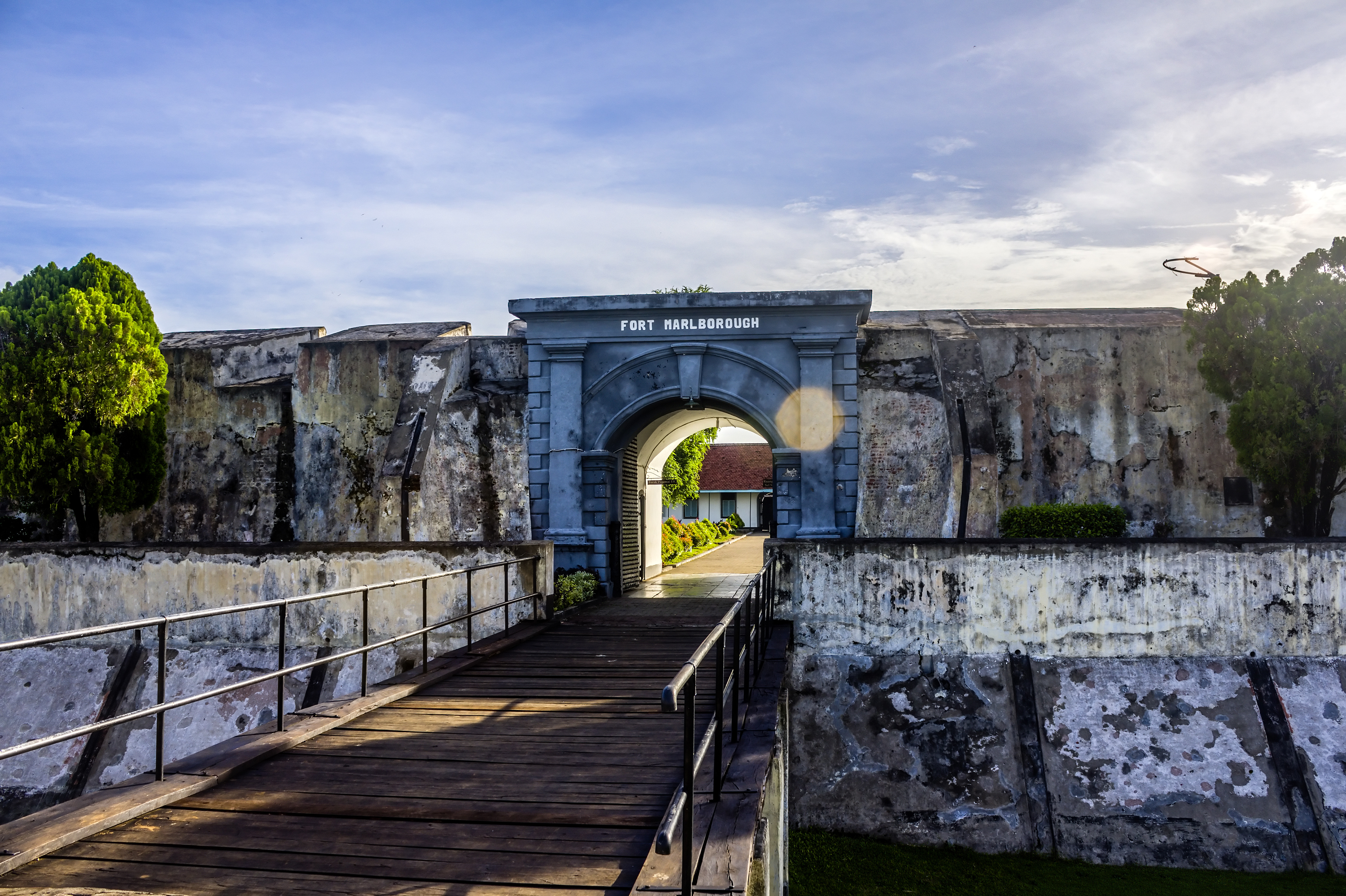
Historical Site of UNESCO, Fort Marlborough located in Bengkulu City.

The first European visitors to the area were the Portuguese, followed by the Dutch in 1596. The British East India Company established a pepper-trading center and garrison at Bengkulu (Bencoolen) in 1685. In 1714 the British built Fort Marlborough, which still stands. The trading post was never profitable for the British, being hampered by a location which Europeans found unpleasant, and by an inability to find sufficient pepper to buy. It became an occasional port of call for the EIC's East Indiamen.

In 1785, the area was integrated into British Empire as Bencoolen, while the rest of Sumatra and most of the Indonesian archipelago was part of the Dutch East Indies. Sir Stamford Raffles was stationed as Lieutenant-Governor of Bencoolen (the colony was subordinate at the time to the Bengal Presidency) from 1818 to 1824, enacting a number of reforms including the abolition of slavery, and the British presence left a number of monuments and forts in the area. Despite the difficulties of keeping control of the area while Dutch colonial power dominated the rest of Sumatra, the British persisted, maintaining their presence for roughly 140 years before ceding Bengkulu to the Dutch as part of the Anglo-Dutch Treaty of 1824 in exchange for Malacca. Bengkulu then remained part of the Dutch East Indies until the Japanese occupation in World War 2.

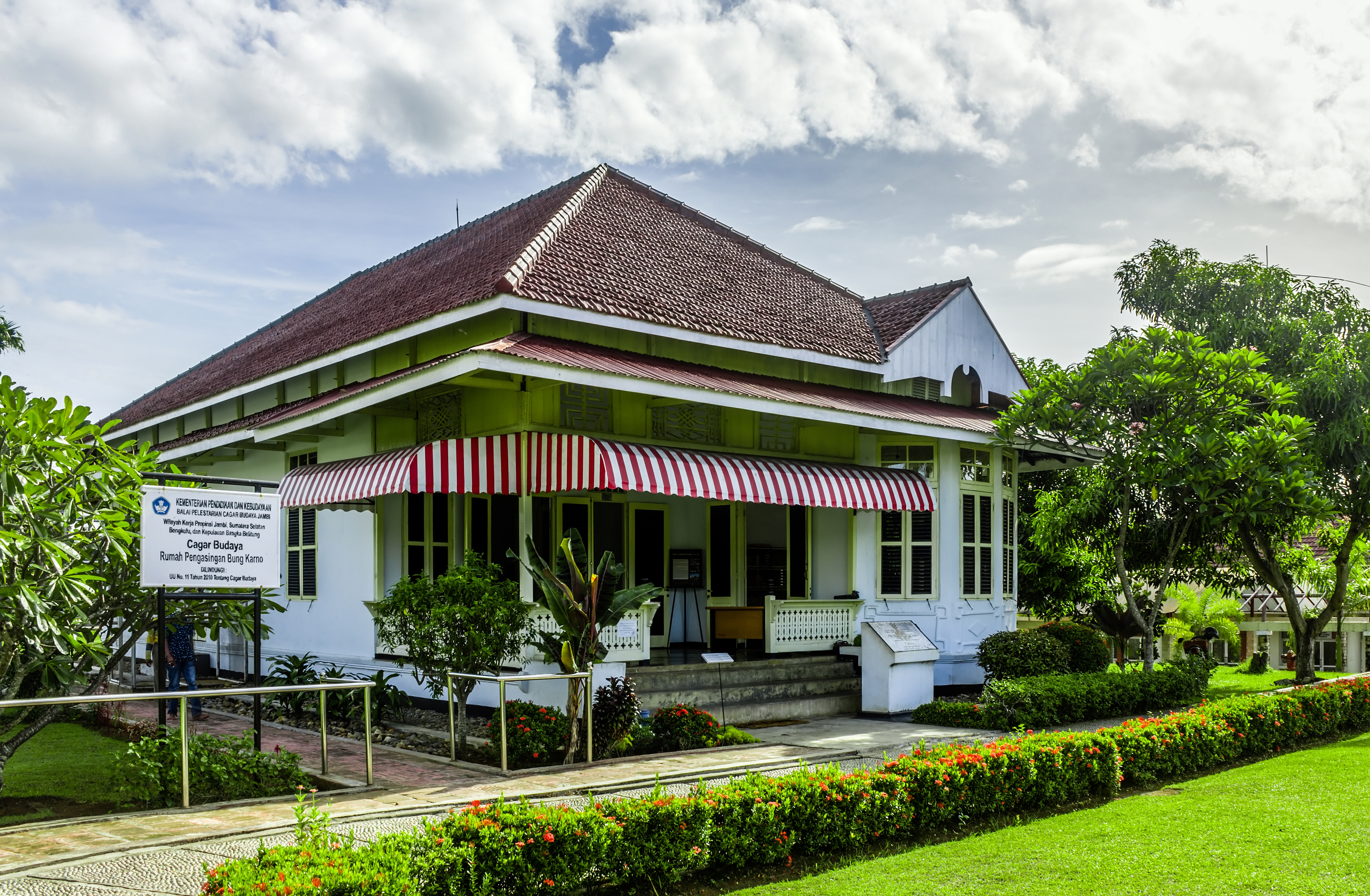
Sukarno's exile house in Bengkulu

During the early 1930s, Sukarno, the future first president of Indonesia, was imprisoned by the Dutch and briefly resided in Bengkulu, where he met his wife, Fatmawati. The couple had several children, including Megawati Sukarnoputri, who later became Indonesia's first female President.

After independence, Bengkulu was initially part of the 'South Sumatra' Province, which also included Lampung, the Bangka-Belitung Islands, and what is now South Sumatra itself, as a Residency. In 1968, Bengkulu gained provincial status, becoming the 26th province of Indonesia, preceding East Timor.

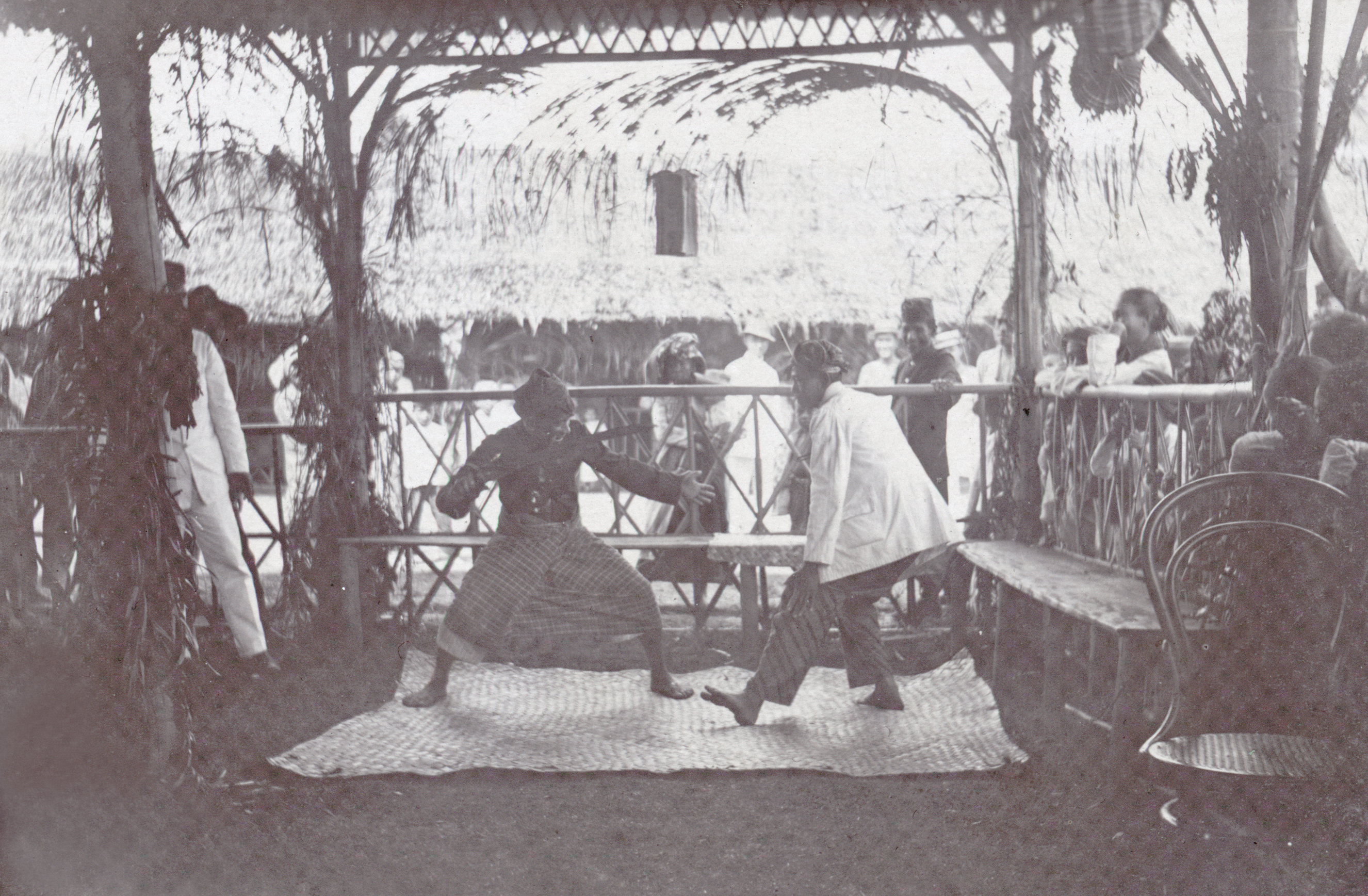
Swordsmen at Benkoelen (Circa 1916–1919).

Bengkulu lies near the Sunda Fault and is prone to earthquakes and tsunamis. The June 2000 Enggano earthquake killed at least 100 people. A recent report predicts that Bengkulu is "at risk of inundation over the next few decades from undersea earthquakes predicted along the coast of Sumatra" A series of earthquakes struck Bengkulu during September 2007, killing 13 people.

== Geography and climate ==
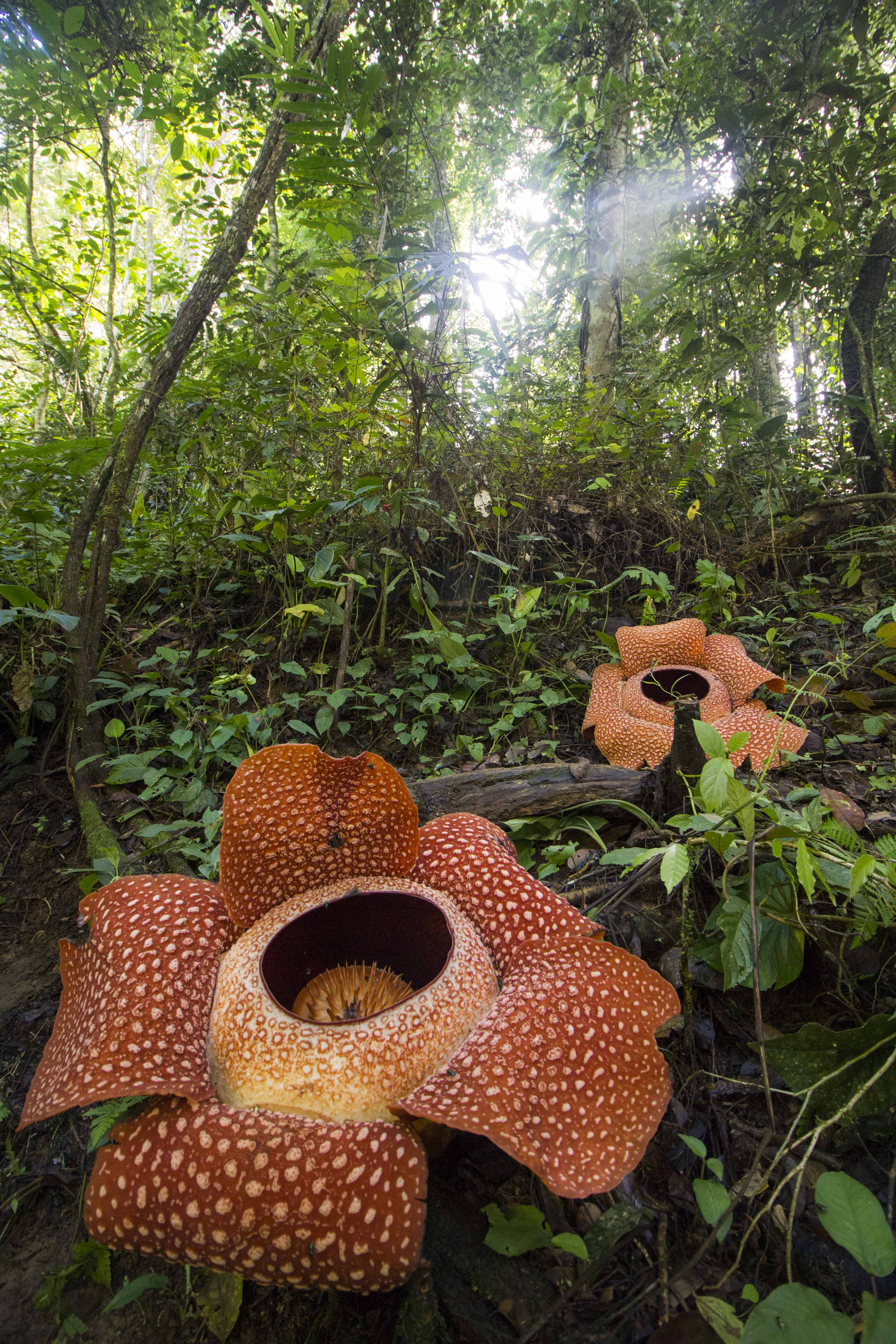
Blooming Indonesia's national flower, Rafflesia arnoldii the biggest flower in the world at Bukit Barisan Selatan National Park.

The western part of Bengkulu province, bordering the Indian Ocean coast, is about 576 km along, and the eastern part of the condition is hilly with a plateau that is prone to erosion. Bengkulu Province is on the west side of the Bukit Barisan mountains. The province's area is about 20,122.21 square kilometres, or slightly smaller than the European country, Slovenia. The province extends from the border province of West Sumatra to the border province of Lampung; the distance is about 567 kilometres. Bengkulu Province lies between 2° 16' S and 03° 31' S latitude and 101° 01'-103° 41'E longitude. Bengkulu province in the north borders the province of West Sumatra, in the southern the Indian Ocean and Lampung province, in the west it borders the Indian Ocean and in the east the provinces of Jambi and South Sumatra. Bengkulu province is also bordered by the Indian Ocean coastline of approximately 525 kilometres to the west. Its western part is hilly with fertile plateaus, while the western part is lowland relatively narrow, elongated from north to south and punctuated bumpy areas.

Bengkulu's climate is classified as tropical. Bengkulu has a large amount of rainfall throughout the year, even in the driest month. The climate here is classified as Af by the Köppen-Geiger system. The annual average temperature is 26.8 °C. The average annual rainfall is 3360 mm.

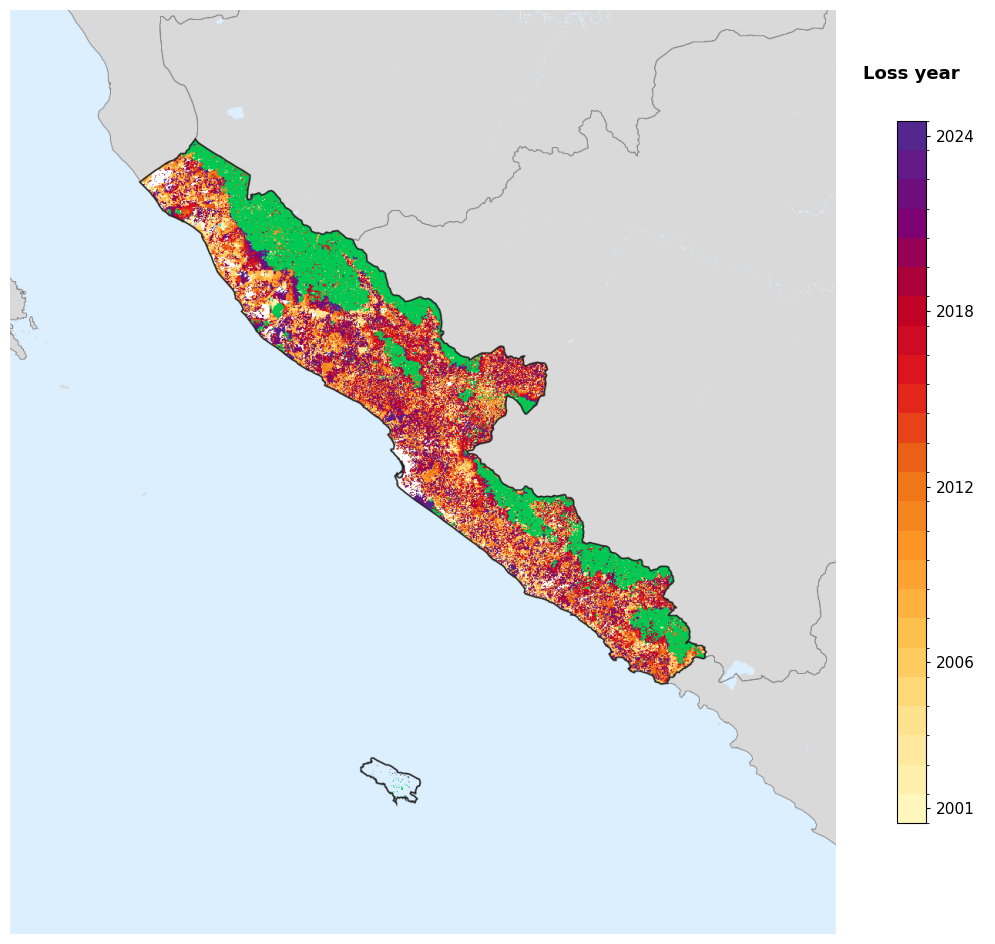
Tree-cover loss year in Bengkulu, 2001-2024, from the Global Forest Change dataset.

The total area of Bengkulu province is 20,122.21 km^{2}. For administrative purposes, the province is divided into nine regencies and one city, together sub-divided into 93 districts.

Climate data for Bengkulu (Fatmawati Soekarno Airport, 1991–2020 normals)
Month	Jan	Feb	Mar	Apr	May	Jun	Jul	Aug	Sep	Oct	Nov	Dec	Year
Record high °C (°F)	33.7 (92.7)	35.2 (95.4)	34.4 (93.9)	34.8 (94.6)	35.4 (95.7)	34.9 (94.8)	35.0 (95.0)	33.9 (93.0)	34.0 (93.2)	33.9 (93.0)	33.8 (92.8)	34.0 (93.2)	35.4 (95.7)
Mean daily maximum °C (°F)	31.0 (87.8)	31.3 (88.3)	31.5 (88.7)	31.5 (88.7)	31.8 (89.2)	31.6 (88.9)	31.3 (88.3)	31.2 (88.2)	31.2 (88.2)	31.1 (88.0)	30.9 (87.6)	30.6 (87.1)	31.2 (88.2)
Daily mean °C (°F)	25.6 (78.1)	25.8 (78.4)	26.0 (78.8)	26.3 (79.3)	26.3 (79.3)	26.0 (78.8)	25.6 (78.1)	25.5 (77.9)	25.6 (78.1)	25.6 (78.1)	25.6 (78.1)	25.4 (77.7)	25.8 (78.4)
Mean daily minimum °C (°F)	22.3 (72.1)	22.3 (72.1)	22.3 (72.1)	22.5 (72.5)	22.5 (72.5)	22.3 (72.1)	22.0 (71.6)	22.0 (71.6)	22.1 (71.8)	22.3 (72.1)	22.3 (72.1)	22.3 (72.1)	22.3 (72.1)
Record low °C (°F)	20.5 (68.9)	20.2 (68.4)	20.4 (68.7)	20.5 (68.9)	20.3 (68.5)	20.5 (68.9)	19.8 (67.6)	19.5 (67.1)	18.1 (64.6)	20.5 (68.9)	20.3 (68.5)	20.8 (69.4)	18.1 (64.6)
Average precipitation mm (inches)	287.9 (11.33)	222.8 (8.77)	259.5 (10.22)	241.1 (9.49)	171.7 (6.76)	133.9 (5.27)	146.8 (5.78)	155.4 (6.12)	147.8 (5.82)	210.7 (8.30)	328.8 (12.94)	359.9 (14.17)	2,666.3 (104.97)
Average precipitation days (≥ 1.0 mm)	16.5	13.7	15.4	13.9	10.7	9.2	8.6	9.1	9.3	13.1	17.0	19.3	155.8
Mean monthly sunshine hours	127.0	133.9	153.8	163.8	179.7	175.7	182.9	185.3	155.0	136.7	120.3	111.4	1,825.5
Source: World Meteorological Organization

== Population ==
Historical population
Year	Pop.	±%
1971	519,316	—
1980	768,064	+47.9%
1990	1,179,122	+53.5%
1995	1,409,117	+19.5%
2000	1,567,436	+11.2%
2010	1,715,518	+9.4%
2015	1,872,136	+9.1%
2020	2,010,670	+7.4%
2025	2,138,044	+6.3%
Source: Badan Pusat Statistik 2019-2025

The 2010 census reported a population of 1,715,518 including 875,663 males and 837,730 females; by the 2020 Census this had risen to 2,010,670, and the official estimate for mid 2025 was 2,138,044.

=== Ethnic groups ===
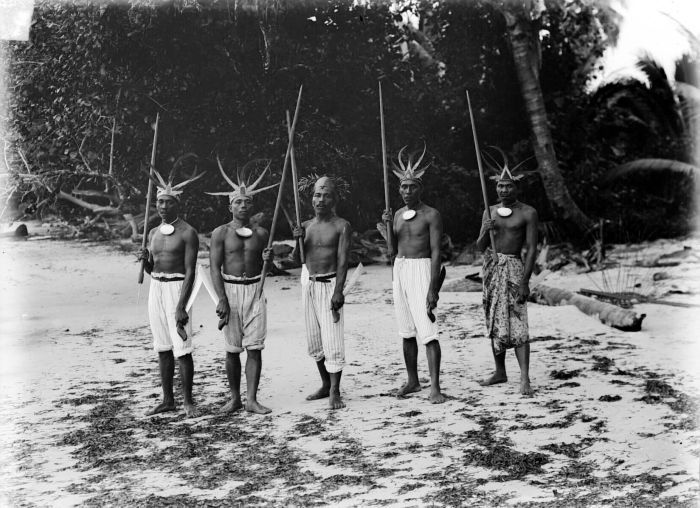
Bengkulu traditional warriors at Enggano Island.

Bengkulu is home to various indigenous ethnic groups. The Rejangs form the majority of the province with 60.4% of the population. The second largest ethnic group is the Javanese forming around 24%. Other minority indigenous ethnic groups includes Lembak, Serawai, Pekal, Enggano, Pasemah, Minangkabau and Bengkulu Malays. There is also non-indigenous ethnic groups that mostly came from other parts of Indonesia such as Sundanese, Javanese, Acehnese, Madurese, Batak, Chinese and others.

=== Religion ===
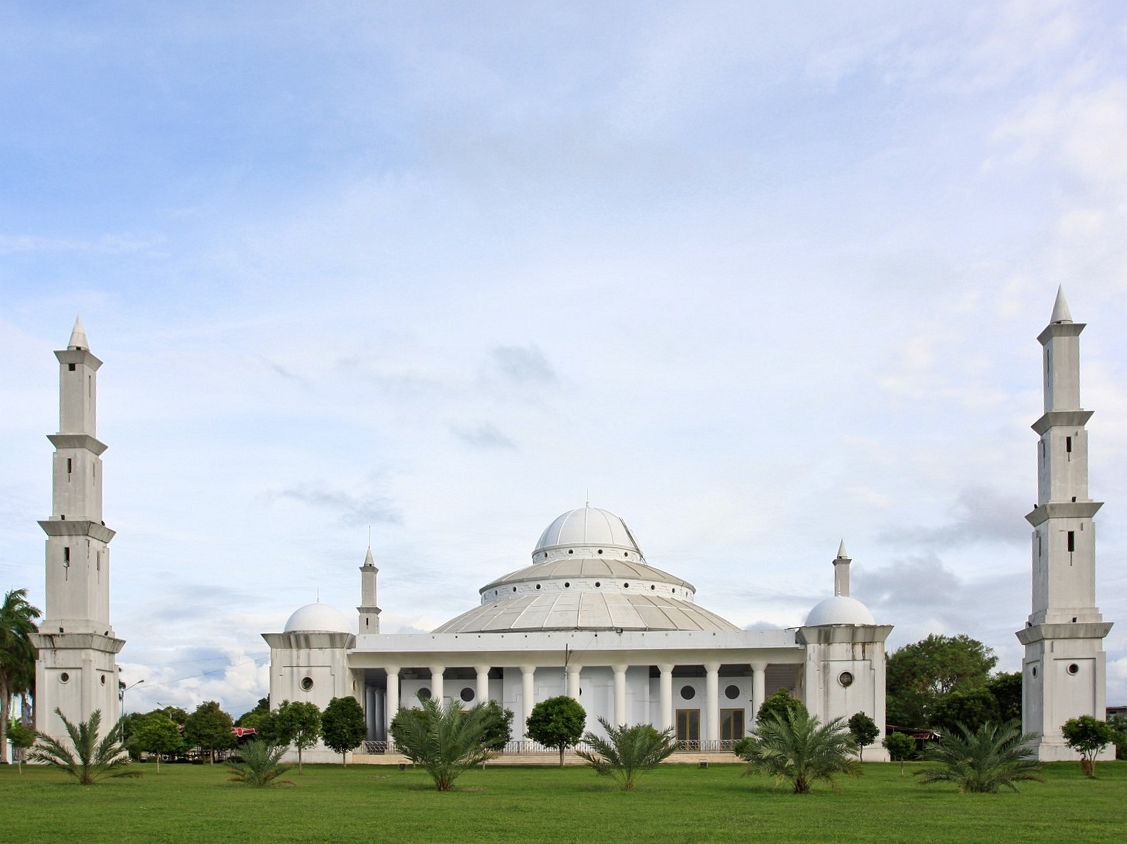
Akbar At-Taqwa Grand Mosque in Bengkulu City

The 2022 data of Ministry of Religious Affairs found 97.69% of the population as adherents to Islam and 2% as Christian. The remainder includes Hindus (0.20%) who are mostly Balinese migrants, Buddhists (0.1%), and "other" including traditional beliefs (0.004%).

=== Languages ===
Like the rest of Indonesia, Indonesian is the official language for formal occasions, institutions, and government affairs while local languages are widely used in daily life.

Most indigenous languages in Bengkulu belong to the Malayan group of Austronesian languages, such as Bengkulu Malay, Lembak, Pekal and Minangkabau varieties. The most widely spoken language in the province, Rejang, is the only Bornean language to be spoken in Sumatra (and one of three outside of Borneo other than Malagasy in Madagascar and Yakan in Basilan).

Engganese is classified as a highly divergent branch of Malayo-Polynesian, however, this is still debated. A less-studied language is Nasal language, which may be related to Rejang or form its own branch of Malayo-Polynesian. Non-indigenous ethnic groups also speak their own language/dialects.

== Government and administrative divisions ==
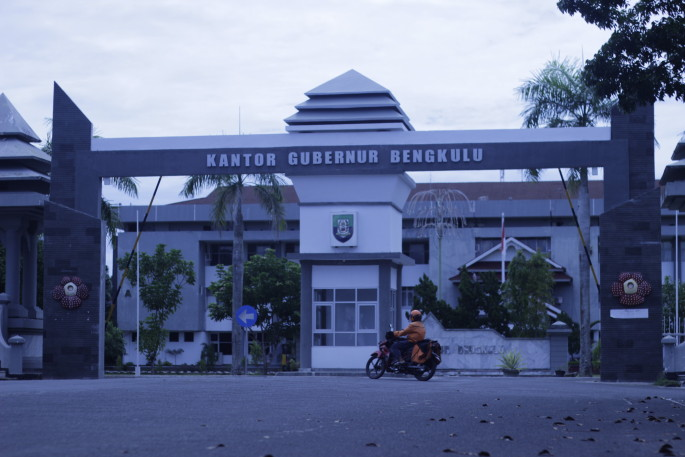
The governor's office in Bengkulu City

When it was formed in 1967 from the western parts of South Sumatra province, Bengkulu Province consisted of three regencies - Bengkulu Selatan (South Bengkulu), Bengkulu Utara (North Bengkulu), and Rejang Lebong - together with the independent city of Bengkulu, which lies outside any regency. Five additional regencies were established on 25 February 2003 - Kaur Regency and Seluma Regency from parts of Bengkulu Selatan, Kepahiang Regency and Lebong Regency from parts of Rejand Lebong Regency, and Mukomuko Regency from part of Bengkulu Utara. A ninth regency (Bengkulu Tengah, Central Bengkulu) was formed on 24 June 2008 from another part of Bengkulu Utara. The regencies and city are listed below with their areas and their populations at the 2010 and 2020 Censuses, together with the official estimates as of mid 2025.

Kode Wilayah	Name of City or Regency	Area in km^{2}	Pop'n Census 2010	Pop'n Census 2020	Pop'n Estimate mid 2025	Capital	HDI 2014 Estimates
17.71	Bengkulu City	150.18	308,544	373,591	403,490	Bengkulu	0.764 (High)
17.09	Central Bengkulu Regency (Bengkulu Tengah)	1,132.41	98,333	116,706	124,190	Karang Tinggi	0.641 (Medium)
17.04	Kaur Regency	2,607.83	107,899	126,551	134,240	Bintuhan	0.637 (Medium)
17.08	Kepahiang Regency	738.97	124,865	149,737	158,010	Kepahiang	0.652 (Medium)
17.07	Lebong Regency	1,666.62	99,215	106,293	113,140	Tubei	0.639 (Medium)
17.06	Mukomuko Regency	4,137.52	155,753	190,498	204,560	Mukomuko	0.653 (Medium)
17.03	North Bengkulu Regency ^{(a)} (Bengkulu Utara)	4,478.11	257,675	296,523	313,520	Arga Makmur	0.672 (Medium)
17.02	Rejang Lebong Regency	1,559.42	246,787	276,645	291,900	Curup	0.665 (Medium)
17.05	Seluma Regency	2,432.09	173,507	207,877	219,880	Pasar Tais	0.629 (Medium)
17.01	South Bengkulu Regency (Bengkulu Selatan)	1,219.06	142,940	166,249	175,130	Kota Manna	0.682 (Medium)
	Totals	20,122.21	1,715,518	2,010,670	2,138,044		0.680 (Medium)

Note: (a) includes Enggano Island and neighbouring small islands in the Indian Ocean.

The province forms one of Indonesia's 84 national electoral districts to elect members to the People's Representative Council. The Bengkulu Electoral District consists of all of the 9 regencies in the province, together with the city of Bengkulu, and elects 4 members to the People's Representative Council.

== Economy ==
Three active coal mining companies produce between 200,000 and 400,000 tons of coal per year, which is exported to Malaysia, Singapore, South Asia, and East Asia. Fishing, particularly tuna and mackerel, is an important activity. Agricultural products exported by the province include ginger, bamboo shoots, and rubber.

== Coat of arms ==
The coat of arms of Bengkulu is in the shape of a shield inscribed with the word "Bengkulu". Inside the shield are a star, a cerana (traditional container), a rudus (traditional weapon), a Rafflesia arnoldii flower, and stalks of rice and coffee.

The star symbolizes belief in God Almighty. The cerana represents high culture, while the rudus signifies heroism. The Rafflesia arnoldii reflects Bengkulu’s natural uniqueness. Rice and coffee symbolize prosperity. The emblem also contains waves with 18 lines, 11 coffee leaves, six coffee flowers on each stalk, and eight stalks in total — together symbolizing 18 November 1968, the date of Bengkulu’s establishment as a province.

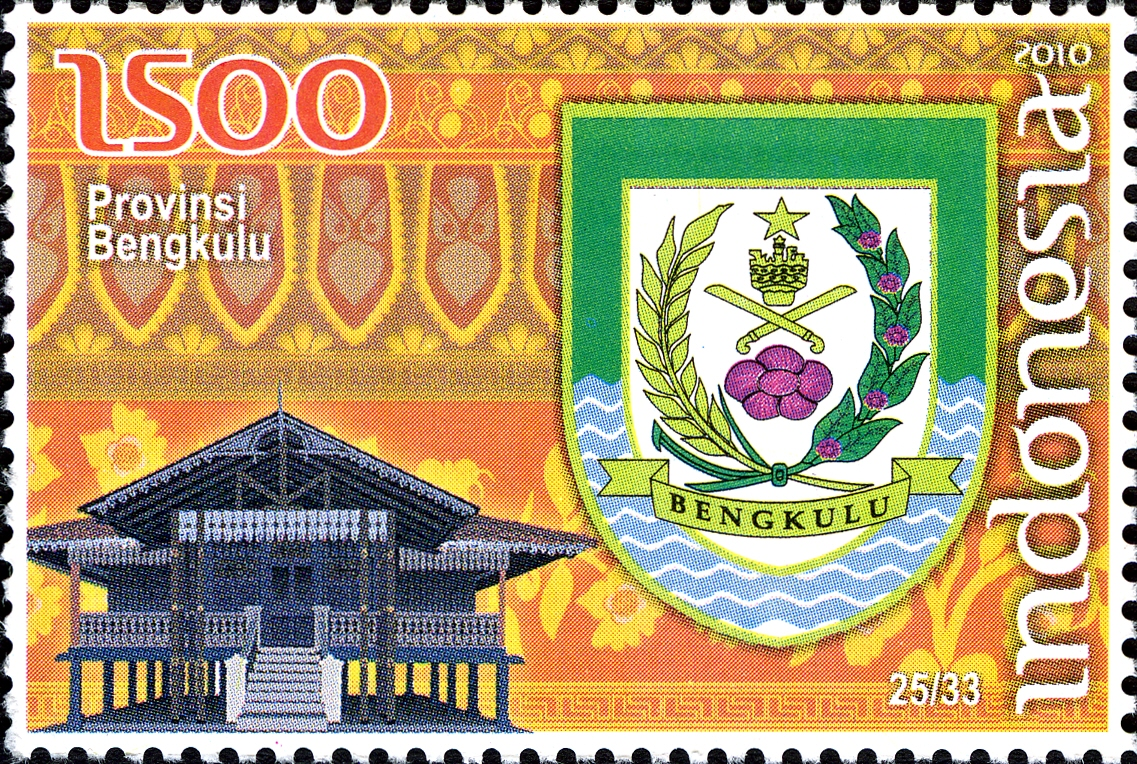
Coat of arms of Bengkulu on a 2010 Indonesian stamp

== See also ==
- List of people from Bengkulu
