= Milton Crosby =

Indonesian politician (born 1959)

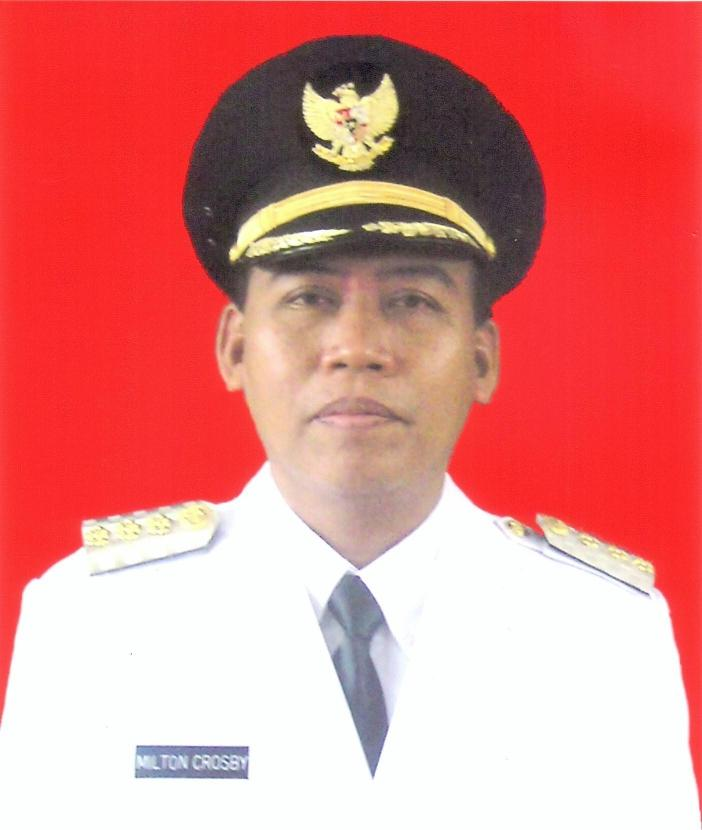
- Portrait as regent, 2012

Regent of Sintang
- In office 2005 – 26 August 2015
- Preceded by: Elyakim Simon Djalil
- Succeeded by: Alexius Akim (act.); Jarot Winarno

Personal details
- Born: 18 June 1959 (age 66) Belitang Hulu, West Kalimantan, Indonesia

Milton Crosby (born 18 June 1959) is an Indonesian politician who served as the regent of Sintang, West Kalimantan from 2005 to 2015. He also made an unsuccessful attempt to run as governor of West Kalimantan in 2018. He has been a leading proponent for the splitting of West Kalimantan's eastern regions into their own province.

== Early life ==
Milton Crosby was born on 18 June 1959 at the village of Baitani, in Belitang Hulu district (then in Sanggau Regency, today part of Sekadau Regency) of West Kalimantan. He is an ethnic Dayak. He studied at the Institute of Government Science in Jakarta, and later obtained a master's in public administration from Gadjah Mada University in 1996.

== Career ==
Crosby worked as a civil servant prior to entering politics. Sintang held its first direct regency election in 2005, and Crosby participated with Jarot Winarno as running mate. They defeated five other candidates including incumbent regent Elyakim Simon Djalil, receiving 42,323 votes (25.1%). Crosby with running mate Ignatius Juan was reelected for a second term in 2010, defeating Winarno and two other candidates after securing 107,297 votes (49.3%). He was sworn in for a second term on 26 August 2010.

He sought a nomination from his party Demokrat to run in West Kalimantan's 2012 gubernatorial election, but the party did not endorse him and instead endorsed Cornelis. Crosby had been a major proponent for the formation of a Kapuas Raya province for inland regions of West Kalimantan (Sintang, Sekadau, Sanggau, Melawi, and Kapuas Hulu), and as he considered Cornelis to be indifferent or hostile to the cause, he chose to move to Golkar and endorsed former Ketapang regent Morkes Effendi.

As regent, Crosby handed over municipal land to the Ministry of Transportation for the construction of a new airport. He also called for increased investment in agricultural downstreaming, namely rubber processing plants. Crosby promoted the expansion of smallholder natural rubber production in Sintang, and opposed new transmigration to the regency.

=== Post-regency ===
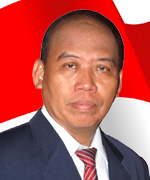
Crosby in 2018 as a gubernatorial candidate.

After his term as regent, Crosby contested the 2018 gubernatorial election for West Kalimantan. With the endorsement of Gerindra and PAN, he selected Boyman Harun (an ethnic Malay Muslim and provincial chairman of PAN) as his running mate. During the electoral campaign, the issue of Kapuas Raya's separation came up, namely the slow progress of its formation under Crosby's leadership. Think-tank Institute for Policy Analysis of Conflict noted that Crosby's candidacy caused a spoiler effect on the inland Dayak voters, which weakened PDI-P's candidate Karolin Margret Natasa. Crosby and Harun ultimately placed last with just 172,151 votes (6.65%) in the three-way race, which was won by Pontianak mayor Sutarmidji. The following year, he ran for a seat in the House of Representatives as a Gerindra candidate from West Kalimantan's 2nd district, but failed to secure a seat, winning 24,233 votes.

He was sued for slander by one of the candidates in Sintang's 2020 regency election when Crosby spoke of his candidacy as "splitting the Dayak vote". In the 2024 gubernatorial election, Crosby did not run and instead endorsed the candidacy of Ria Norsan (Sutarmidji's 2018 running mate). He also endorsed the candidacy of Sintang DPRD member Heri Jambri in Sintang's 2024 regency election. He has voiced his support for the movement of Indonesia's capital to Kalimantan, claiming that it would further promote the cause of Kapuas Raya's formation.

== Personal life ==
Crosby is married to Kati Evelina, and the couple has at least one son and one daughter.
