= List of incumbent regional heads and deputy regional heads in West Kalimantan =

The following is an article about the list of Regional Heads and Deputy Regional Heads in 14 regencies/cities in West Kalimantan who are currently still serving.

== List ==
Regency/ City	Photo of the Regent/ Mayor	Regent/ Mayor	Photo of Deputy Regent/ Mayor	Deputy Regent/ Mayor	Taking Office	End of Office (Planned)	Ref.
Bengkayang; Regency List of Regents/Deputy Regents		Sebastianus Darwis		Syamsul Rizal	20 February 2025	20 February 2030	
Kapuas Hulu; Regency List of Regents/Deputy Regents		Fransiskus Diaan		Sukardi	20 February 2025	20 February 2030	
North Kayong; Regency List of Regents/Deputy Regents		Romi Wijaya	jmp	Amru Chanwari	20 February 2025	20 February 2030	
Ketapang; Regency List of Regents/Deputy Regents		Alexander Wilyo		Jamhuri Amir	20 February 2025	20 February 2030	
Kubu Raya; Regency List of Regents/Deputy Regents		Sujiwo		Sukiryanto	20 February 2025	20 February 2030	
Landak; Regency List of Regents/Deputy Regents		Karolin Margret Natasa		Erani	20 February 2025	20 February 2030	
Melawi; Regency List of Regents/Deputy Regents		Dadi Sunarya Usfa Yursa		Malin	20 February 2025	20 February 2030	
Mempawah; Regency List of Regents/Deputy Regents		Erlina Ria Norsan		Juli Suryadi Burdadi	20 February 2025	20 February 2030	
Sambas; Regency List of Regents/Deputy Regents		Satono		Heroaldi Djuhardi Alwi	20 February 2025	20 February 2030	
Sanggau; Regency List of Regents/Deputy Regents		Yohanes Ontot		Susana Herpena	20 February 2025	20 February 2030	
Sekadau; Regency List of Regents/Deputy Regents		Aron		Subandrio	20 February 2025	20 February 2030	
Sintang; Regency List of Regents/Deputy Regents		Gregorius Herkulanus Bala		Florensius Ronny	20 February 2025	20 February 2030	
Pontianak; City List of Mayors/Deputy mayors		Edi Rusdi Kamtono		Bahasan	20 February 2025	20 February 2030	
Singkawang; City List of Mayors/Deputy mayors		Tjhai Chui Mie		Muhammadin	20 February 2025	20 February 2030	

Notes

- "Commencement of office" is the inauguration date at the beginning or during the current term of office. For acting regents/mayors, it is the date of appointment or extension as acting regent/mayor.
- Based on the Constitutional Court decision Number 27/PUU-XXII/2024, the Governor and Deputy Governor, Regent and Deputy Regent, and Mayor and Deputy Mayor elected in 2020 shall serve until the inauguration of the Governor and Deputy Governor, Regent and Deputy Regent, and Mayor and Deputy Mayor elected in the 2024 national simultaneous elections as long as the term of office does not exceed 5 (five) years.

== See also ==
- West Kalimantan
