= STIKes Kapuas Raya =

University in Indonesia

Coordinates: 0.058°S 109.347°E

- STIKes Kapuas Raya
- Type: Public
- Established: 20 July 2009
- Rector: Uray B Asnol.SKM, MM
- Location: Sintang, Kapuas Raya, Indonesia
- Website: http://www.stikes-kapuasraya.ac.id

STIKes Kapuas Raya (Indonesian: STIKes Kapuas Raya) or STIKes Kapuas Raya is a public university located in the city of Sintang in Kapuas Raya, Indonesia.

== History ==
The name STIKes Kapuas Raya is related to the name of the province Kapuas Raya, which forms a piece of the north province of Kalbar.
