= Elyakim Simon Djalil =

Indonesian politician (born 1949)

Regent of Sintang
- In office 2000–2005
- Preceded by: Abdillah Kamarullah
- Succeeded by: Milton Crosby

Personal details
- Born: 3 February 1949 (age 76) Sintang, West Kalimantan, Indonesia

Elyakim Simon Djalil (born 3 February 1949) is an Indonesian former politician and civil servant who served as the regent of Sintang, West Kalimantan for one term between 2000 and 2005. He was involved in a corruption case, and was sentenced to two years' prison.

== Early life ==
Elyakim Simon Djalil was born on 3 February 1949 at the village of Senaning, in Sintang Regency. He was the seventh of ten children, and his parents were farmers. He completed elementary school near his home village, then middle school in Pontianak before going to Sintang's regency seat for high school, graduating in 1972. He later studied public administration in Pontianak (graduated 1976) and Institute of Government Science in Jakarta (graduated 1981). He initially did not intend to study public administration, but due to the economic problems caused by the Indonesia–Malaysia confrontation around the time he enrolled, he opted for a public administration course at it allowed him to earn an income mid-study.

== Career ==
He became a civil servant in 1973, starting as a staffer at the gubernatorial office of West Kalimantan. In 1984, he moved to the home governance academy (APDN) in Pontianak, where he worked in various posts until April 1994 when he became head of the training section of West Kalimantan's HR department. Dayak civil servants were very scarce in high-ranking government posts in the province at the time, with Djalil being one of the first Dayak officials in the HR department. Djalil was accused by a senior Malay bureaucrat of favoring Dayak civil servants for training, which resulted from his transfer from the post in March 1995. He then became head of the provincial archives in 2000.

Also in 2000, Djalil was elected by the Regional House of Representatives of Sintang Regency as regent, part of a wave of Dayak politicians being elected to executive offices in the province. During his tenure as regent, he called for an increase of authority for the municipal government to handle border affairs (with Sarawak, Malaysia), in order to increase cross-border trade and investment. He attempted to run for a second term in 2005 with the support of PDI-P, securing 39,791 votes (24%) with Milton Crosby winning the election.

Following his loss in the 2005 election, Djalil began to campaign for the formation of a new regency, Ketungau, out of three northern districts of Sintang. The districts, which included his home village, had voted for him in the 2005 election. He opted not to run for the 2010 regency election.

=== Corruption case ===
By the time of the 2005 election, Djalil had been rumored to be involved in illegal logging in Sintang, and the issue hurt his electoral performance. A 2006 audit by the Audit Board of Indonesia found irregularities in the municipal budget, and in 2009 the District Court of Sintang found Djalil guilty of corruption over reforestration and forestry revenue funds. The High Court of West Kalimantan upheld the decision on 28 July 2009, and the Supreme Court of Indonesia did so on 24 January 2011, sentencing Djalil to 2 years' imprisonment and a Rp 200 million fine. He had been imprisoned for six months, but was initially released. On 17 March 2015, Djalil was arrested again by the Attorney General's Office of Indonesia at his home in Pontianak over the case.

After his release, Djalil remained active in Dayak cultural affairs in Sintang. He endorsed the proposed Indonesian capital move to Kalimantan, citing plans from first and second presidents Sukarno and Suharto to do so. For the 2024 West Kalimantan gubernatorial election, he publicly endorsed PDI-P politician Lasarus, who ultimately did not take part in the election.

== Personal life ==
Djalil is married to Agnesia Atte, and the couple has three children. Djalil and Atte's eldest child died at the age of 10. He is a Protestant Christian.
