= Baning Nature Tourist Park =

Nature park in West Kalimantan, Indonesia

Coordinates: 0.07149224°N 111.52629096°E

- Location within Indonesia
- Location: Sintang Regency, West Kalimantan, Indonesia
- Nearest city: Sintang Regency
- Area: 315 ha (780 acres)
- Established: 1991

Baning Nature Tourist Park is a Nature Park located at Sintang Regency of West Kalimantan province of Indonesia in the island of Borneo. It is spread over an area of about 315 hectares. It is the only natural tropical forests in Indonesia which is situated with the vicinity of locality. The park is covered by thousands of large trees and rich with various flora and fauna of scarcity. There is a laboratory for supporting research and development of living resources in the region.

== History ==
The first time, the area is designated as a Protected Forest Area Baning based Sintang Regent Decree No. 07/A-II/1975 on June 1, 1975 with total area of about 315 hectares. Sintang District Government to realize this decision, one way to close the Road and Road Baning Tenebrous 2 that contained in this tourist area. In subsequent developments, the central government through Decree of the Minister of Forestry of the Republic of Indonesia Number 129/Kpts-II/90 on March 24, 1990, raising the status of the region into Forest Nature Tourism Baning. Then, based on the Decree of the Minister of Forestry and Plantations of the Republic of Indonesia Number 405/Kpts-II/99 on June 14, 1999, the area is designated as a Nature Park Baning with area about 213 hectares.

== Flora and fauna ==
There are a variety of rare flora, such as ramin (Gonystylus bancanus sp.), jelutung (Lawii era), resam (Dicranopteris linearis), Rengas (Gluta renghas), Medang (Litsea firma), mentibu (Daclylocladus stenostachys), perepat (Combretocarpus rotundatus), bintangor (Calophyllum inophyllum), Pulai (Alstonia scholaris), kempilik (Quercus sp.), birds tamang (Eugenia sp), semar bag, and black orchid. Various rare fauna, such as pied kingfisher (Halcyon smyrnensis), monitor lizards (Varanus salvator), pigeon (Treron vernans), parrots (Gracula religiosa), cucakrawa (Pycnonotus zeylanicus), water civet (Cynogale bennettii), ground squirrels (Lariscus insignis), flying squirrels (Petaurista elegans), sailors, and various species of birds.

== Attractions and facilities ==
The air in the park is cool and fresh, leafy and green trees with its flora and fauna, making the nature Park a tourist destination. A wooden bridge divides the forest, which can be used by visitors who want to enjoy the coolness and biological richness of the height of the region. For cross-country sports enthusiasts, there is path winding down to the woods with a fairly challenging terrain. There are wide area camping ground.

There are food stalls, canteens, hawkers and street vendors who provide various food and beverage menu. A tourist information centers, security forces, public hospitals, health centers, polyclinics, pharmacies, camping ground, mosque, church, telephone kiosk, and souvenirs shop. For those who want to stay, there are guesthouse, and hotel of different types.

== Transportation ==
Sintang District is approximately 395 kilometers east of Pontianak, the capital of West Kalimantan Province. From Pontianak to Sintang, visitors can board the plane. Visitors can also take a taxi, bus travel, bus or private vehicle with a travel time of about 6 hours drive. From the city center Sintang towards Baning Nature Park, visitors can access it by bus, minibus, public transportation, or personal vehicle. The area can be reached by access foot or by bicycle from downtown Sintang.

== See also ==
- Sintang Regency
