= Jarot Winarno =

Indonesian politician (born 1960)

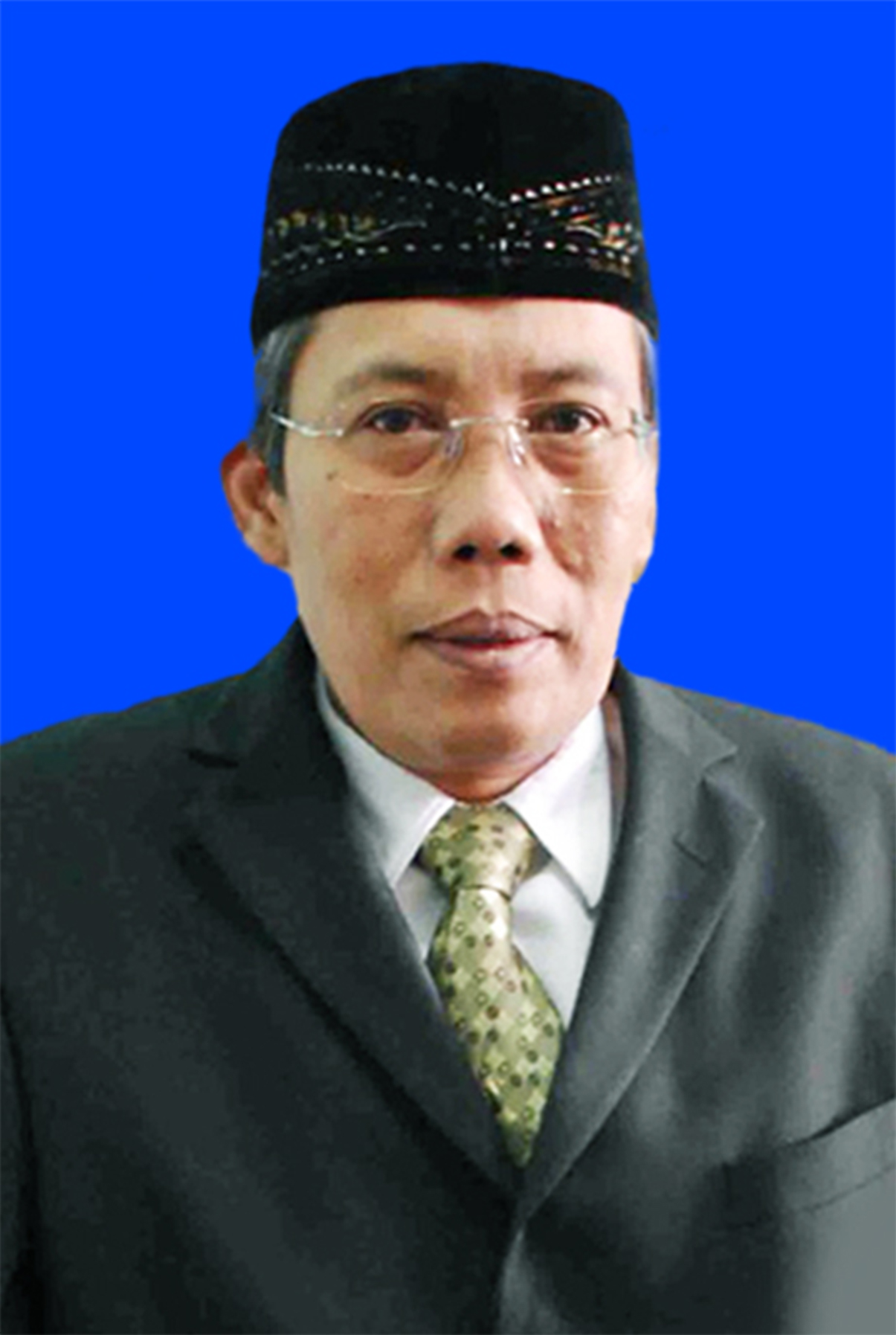
- 2020 portrait

Regent of Sintang
- In office 26 February 2021 – 20 February 2025
- In office 17 February 2016 – 17 February 2021
- Preceded by: Milton Crosby
- Succeeded by: Gregorius Herkulanus Bala

Personal details
- Born: 22 January 1960 (age 66) Klaten, Central Java, Indonesia

Jarot Winarno (born 22 January 1960) is an Indonesian politician, physician and civil servant who served as the regent of Sintang Regency, West Kalimantan from 2016 to 2025 and as vice regent from 2005 to 2010. Prior to entering politics, he began his career as a physician in the province and later worked in the bureaucracy of its health department.

== Early life ==
Jarot Winarno was born in Klaten, Central Java on 22 January 1960. His father was a major in the Indonesian Army. Winarno spent his childhood in Jakarta, where he studied at state-funded schools. After graduating from SMA Negeri 8 Jakarta in 1977, he studied medicine at the University of Indonesia, receiving his degree in 1985. He would later also study at the National University of Singapore where he obtained a master's in 1995.

== Career ==
After graduating from the University of Indonesia, Winarno began to work as head of a Puskesmas in Ketungau Hilir district of Sintang Regency. He headed two other Puskesmas in Sintang until 1993, when he was appointed head of Sintang's municipal health department, serving in the post until 1997 when he was brought to the provincial government of West Kalimantan.

He entered electoral politics in 2005, participating as the running mate of Milton Crosby in the regency's first direct election. Crosby and Winarno defeated five other candidates, winning 42,323 votes (25.1%). In 2010, he ran against Crosby as regent, but placed second in the four-way election with 88,990 votes (40.93%), Crosby securing his second term.

=== Regent ===
In the 2015 regency election, Winarno made a second run for regent with Askiman as his running mate, defeating two other pairs of candidates. They were sworn in as regent on 17 February 2016. Winarno won reelection for a second term in 2020 with Sudiyanto as running mate, defeating two other candidates including Askiman and winning 114,529 votes (47.95%). Politically, he is a member of the NasDem Party.

Winarno suffered a stroke in 2021, which immobilized him for a time, and in that same year his deputy Sudiyanto died of an illness. During that period, Sintang's regional secretary Yosepha performed much of their duties. In 2024, during a protest against perceived poor waste handling in Sintang following the closure of a landfill in 2021, locals dumped truckloads of waste in front of his office. In 2021, Winarno announced that oil palm plantations in Sintang would be limited to 200 thousand hectares (compared to 170 thousand in 2020), with 865 thousand hectares out of 1.2 million hectares of Sintang's jungle areas being designated as conserved areas.

== Personal life ==
He is married to Fauziah Zainal Ehsan, also a physician by training, and the couple has one children. On his 65th birthday in 2025, he launched two books on his life and career in Sintang.
