= 2018 West Kalimantan gubernatorial election =

Local election in Indonesia

- 27 June 2018
- Turnout: 75.1%
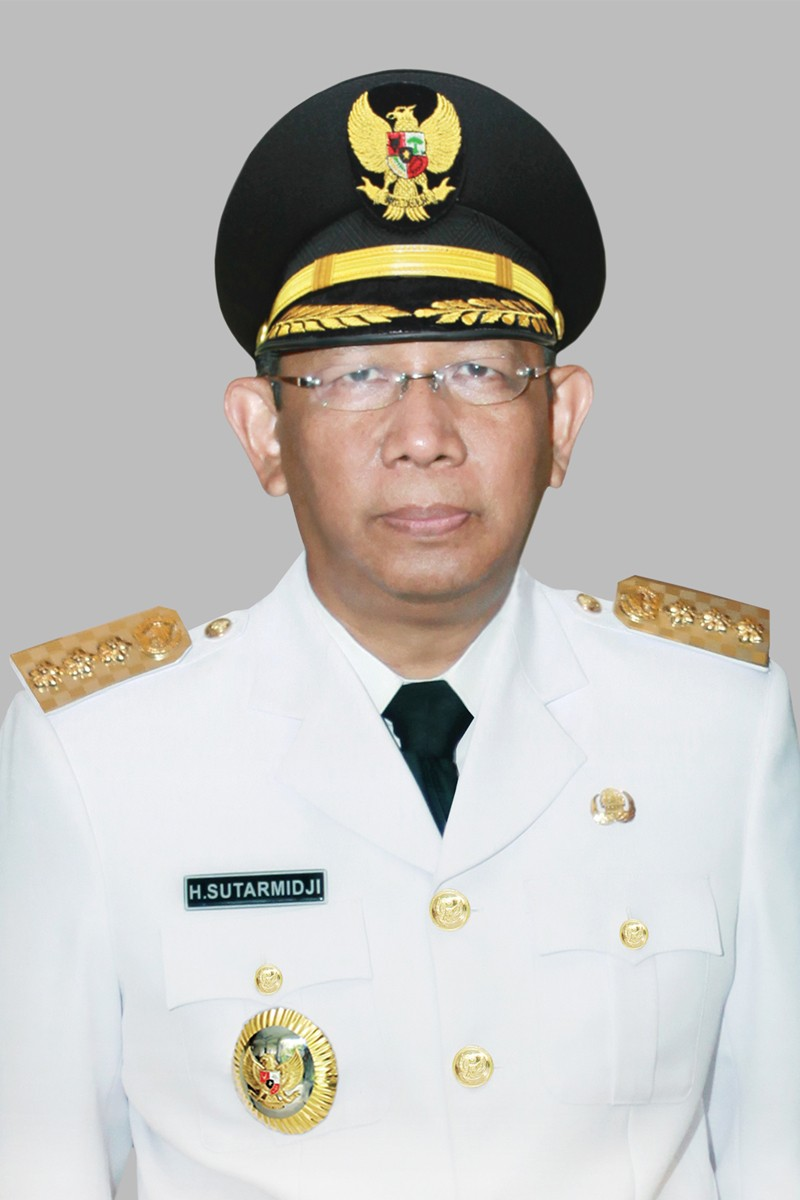

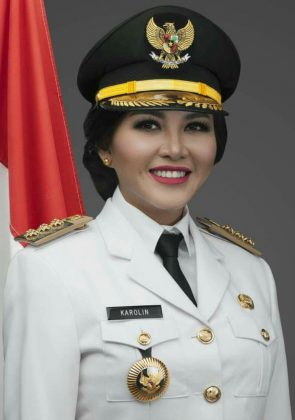

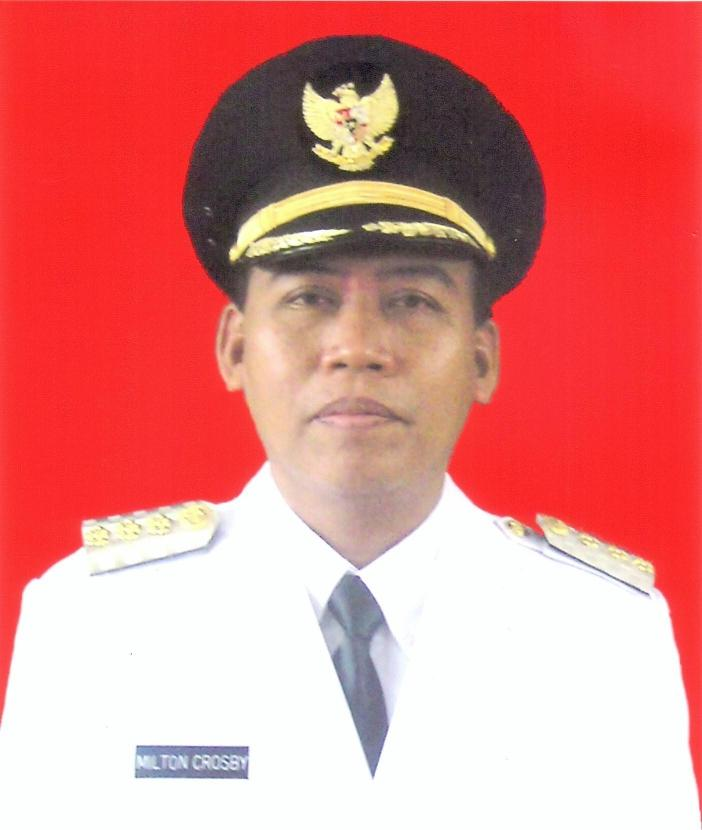
Nominee	Sutarmidji	Karolin Margret Natasa	Milton Crosby
Party	PPP	PDI-P	Gerindra
Running mate	Ria Norsan	Suryadman Gidot	Boyman Harun
Popular vote	1,334,512	1,081,878	172,151
Percentage	51.55%	41.79%	6.65%
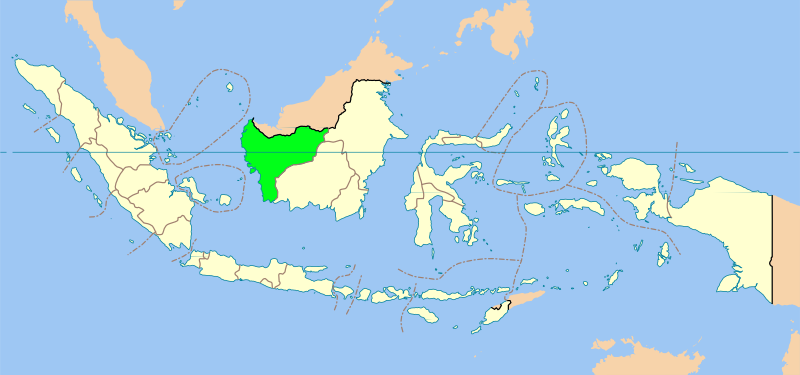
- Location of West Kalimantan within Indonesia
Governor before election
Cornelis
PDI-P
Elected Governor
Sutarmidji
PPP

The 2018 West Kalimantan gubernatorial election took place on 27 June 2018 as part of the simultaneous local elections. It was held to elect the governor of West Kalimantan along with their deputy, whilst members of the provincial council (Dewan Perwakilan Rakyat Daerah) will be re-elected in 2019.

With incumbent Cornelis M.H. barred after serving two full terms, the election was contested by three pairs of candidates: Pontianak mayor Sutarmidji, Landak regent Karolin Margret Natasa and former regent of Sintang Milton Crosby.

The election resulted in victory for Sutarmidji, who secured 51.5 percent of the votes. Karolin came in second with 41.8 percent while Milton won less than 7 percent of votes.

== Timeline ==
Registration for party-backed candidates were opened between 8 and 10 January 2018, while independent candidates were required to register between 22 and 26 November 2017. The numerical order of the candidates were determined on 13 February through a lottery. In April 2018, the provincial KPU set the number of voters at 3,436,127. The campaigning period would commence between 15 February and 24 June, with a three-day election silence before voting on 27 June.

== Candidates ==
#	Candidate	Position	Running mate	Parties
1	Milton Crosby	Regent of Sintang (2005–2015)	Boyman Harun	Gerindra; PAN; Total: 13 seats
2	Karolin Margret Natasa	Regent of Landak; Member of People's Representative Council (2009–2017)	Suryadman Gidot	PDI-P; Demokrat; PKPI; Total: 27 seats
3	Sutarmidji	Mayor of Pontianak	Ria Norsan	Golkar; Nasdem; PKB; PKS; Hanura; Total: 21 seats

In addition, an independent ticket also registered, but failed to submit a sufficient number of supporting ID cards.
