= 2024 West Kalimantan gubernatorial election =

- 27 November 2024
- Registered: 3,956,969
- Turnout: 68.11% (▼6.96pp)
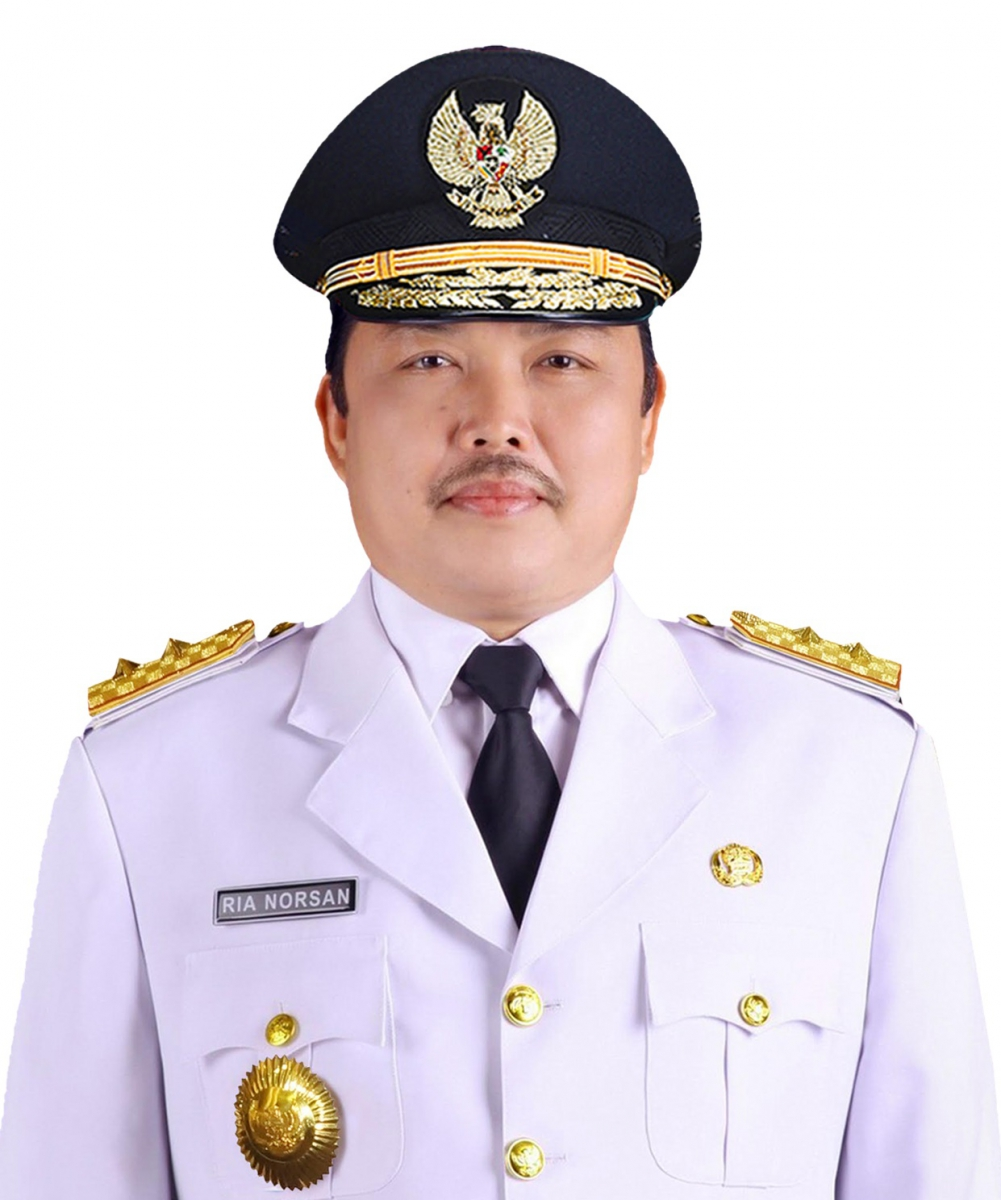

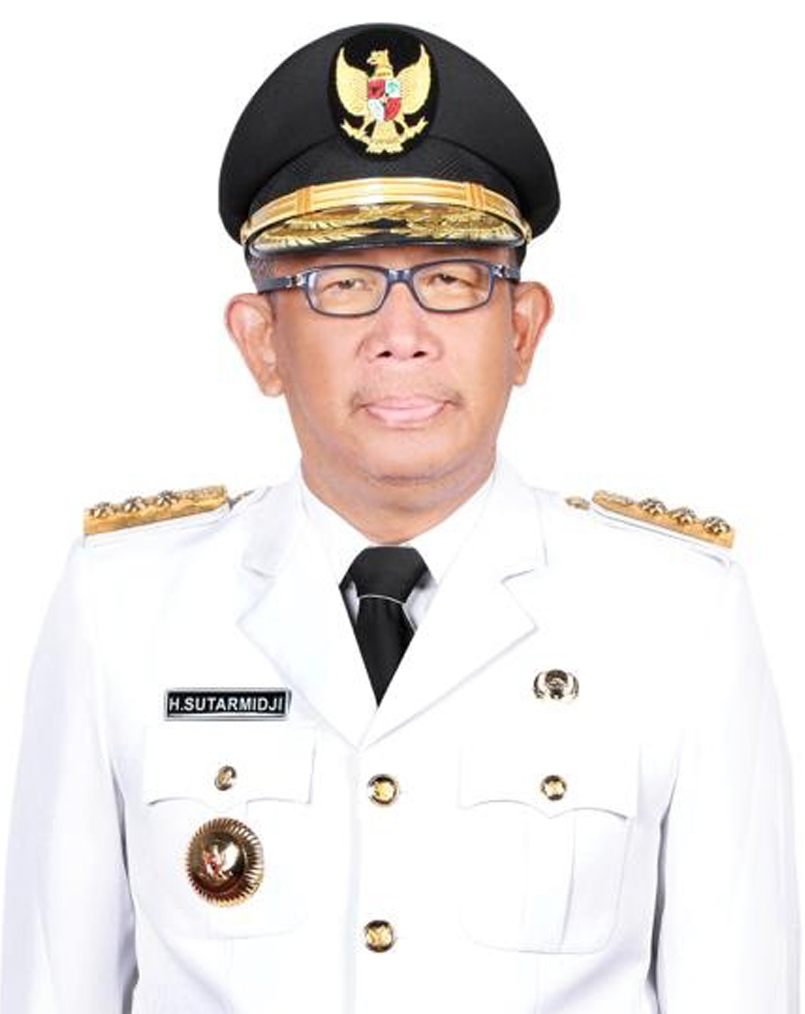

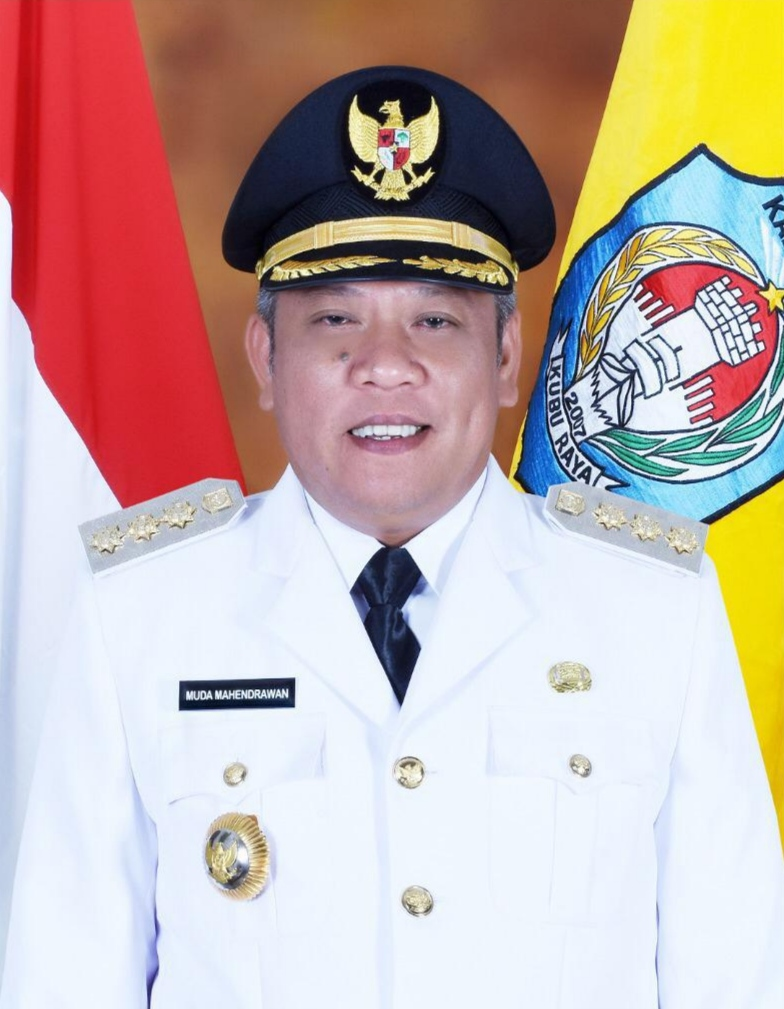
Candidate	Ria Norsan	Sutarmidji	Muda Mahendrawan
Party	Golkar (Note: Despite Ria Norsan being a member of Golkar, the party instead backed Sutarmidji)	PPP (Note: Despite Sutarmidji being a member of the PPP, the party instead backed Ria Norsan)	Independent
Alliance	–	KIM Plus	–
Running mate	Krisantus Kurniawan	Didi Haryono	Jakius Sinyor
Popular vote	1,364,563	963,453	256,530
Percentage	52.80%	37.28%	9.93%
- Results by district
Governor before election
Harrison Azroi (acting)
Independent
Elected Governor
Ria Norsan
Golkar

The 2024 West Kalimantan gubernatorial election was held on 27 November 2024 to elect the governor and vice governor of West Kalimantan for a five-year term. The election was held as part of local elections for governors, regents, and mayors across 36 other provinces in Indonesia.

Sutarmidji, the previous elected governor, was eligible to run for a second term. He was challenged by his former Vice Governor Ria Norsan as well as former Kubu Raya Regent Muda Mahendrawan. As a result, three candidate pairs participated in the election. Norsan won the election with 52% of the vote. He also won all cities and 10 regencies, losing only the Sambas and North Kayong regencies. Sutarmidji received 37%, while Mahendrawan placed a distant third with 9%.

== Electoral system ==
The election, like other local elections in 2024, follows the first-past-the-post system where the candidate with the most votes wins the election, even if they do not win a majority. It is possible for a candidate to run uncontested, in which case the candidate is still required to win a majority of votes "against" an "empty box" option. Should the candidate fail to do so, the election will be repeated on a later date.

== Candidates ==
According to electoral regulations, in order to qualify for the election, candidates were required to secure support from a political party or a coalition which had gained at least 8.5% of valid votes in the 2024 West Kalimantan Regional House of Representatives election. Therefore the PDI-P (19%), NasDem (13%), Golkar (12%), Gerindra (12%), and the Democratic Party (9%) were eligible to nominate a candidate without forming coalitions with other political parties. Candidates may alternatively demonstrate support in form of photocopies of identity cards, which in West Kalimantan's case corresponds to 300,883 copies. Former regent of Kubu Raya Muda Mahendrawan initially registered to run as an independent and submitted enough support to the General Elections Commission, but later withdrew his registration as an independent citing potential support from political parties.

=== Declared ===
These following candidates qualified to contest the election:

Candidate from PPP and Golkar
Sutarmidji	Didi Haryono
for Governor	for Vice Governor
Governor of West Kalimantan (2018–2023)	Head of Regional Police West Kalimantan (2017–2020)
Parties
41 / 65 (63%) NasDem (10 seats); Golkar (9 seats); Gerindra (9 seats); Demokrat (6 seats); PAN (5 seats); PKS (2 seats)

Candidate from Independent
Muda Mahendrawan	Jakius Sinyor
for Governor	for Vice Governor
Regent of Kubu Raya (2019–)	Acting Regent of Landak (2022–)
Parties
5 / 65 (8%) PKB (5 seats)

Candidate from Golkar and PDI-P
Ria Norsan	Krisantus Kurniawan
for Governor	for Vice Governor
Vice Governor of West Kalimantan (2018–2023)	Member of DPR RI PDI-P (2019–2024)
Parties
19 / 65 (29%) PDI-P (13 seats); Hanura (4 seats); PPP (2 seats)

== Political map ==
Following the 2024 Indonesian general election, ten political parties were represented in the West Kalimantan Regional House of Representatives:

Political parties	Seat count
Indonesian Democratic Party of Struggle (PDI-P)	13 / 65
NasDem Party	10 / 65
Great Indonesia Movement Party (Gerindra)	9 / 65
Party of Functional Groups (Golkar)	9 / 65
Democratic Party (Demokrat)	6 / 65
National Awakening Party (PKB)	5 / 65
National Mandate Party (PAN)	5 / 65
People's Conscience Party (Hanura)	4 / 65
Prosperous Justice Party (PKS)	2 / 65
United Development Party (PPP)	2 / 65

== Results ==
Candidate	Running mate	Party	Votes	%
Ria Norsan	Krisantus Kurniawan	Golkar	1,364,563	52.80
Sutarmidji	Didi Haryono	United Development Party	963,453	37.28
Muda Mahendrawan	Jakius Sinyor	Independent	256,530	9.93
Total			2,584,546	100.00
Valid votes			2,584,546	95.90
Invalid/blank votes			110,405	4.10
Total votes			2,694,951	100.00
Registered voters/turnout			3,956,969	68.11
Source: KPU

=== Results by administrative area ===
Administrative area	Sutarmidji Didi Haryono		Ria Norsan Krisantus Kurniawan		Muda Mahendrawan Jakius Sinyor		Valid votes		Invalid/blank votes		Total votes		Abstentions		Registered voters
Administrative area	Votes	%	Votes	%	Votes	%	Total	%	Total	%	Total	%	Total	%	Registered voters
Sambas	154,189	53.75%	114,640	39.96%	18,029	6.28%	286,858	96.69%	9,830	3.31%	296,688	64.78%	161,337	35.22%	458,025
Mempawah	47,587	40.48%	60,093	51.12%	9,884	8.41%	117,564	96.43%	4,356	3.57%	121,920	57.08%	91,659	42.92%	213,579
Sanggau	67,915	28.53%	144,323	60.63%	25,782	10.83%	238,020	95.32%	11,695	4.68%	249,715	69.89%	107,605	30.11%	357,320
Ketapang	97,629	40.31%	119,187	49.22%	25,350	10.47%	242,166	95.38%	11,728	4.62%	253,894	61.53%	158,752	38.47%	412,646
Sintang	64,864	26.21%	156,529	63.24%	26,117	10.55%	247,510	96.29%	9,547	3.71%	257,057	80.13%	63,756	19.87%	320,813
Kapuas Hulu	59,204	38.56%	88,102	57.38%	6,244	4.07%	153,550	95.89%	6,581	4.11%	160,131	81.65%	35,984	18.35%	196,115
Bengkayang	32,967	30.54%	63,584	58.91%	11,391	10.55%	107,942	94.77%	5,958	5.23%	113,900	55.21%	92,408	44.79%	206,308
Landak	49,627	22.11%	137,184	61.11%	37,694	16.79%	224,505	95.24%	11,229	4.76%	235,734	82.82%	48,897	17.18%	284,631
Sekadau	51,866	43.19%	63,756	53.09%	4,469	3.72%	120,091	97.20%	3,465	2.80%	123,556	78.43%	33,987	21.57%	157,543
Melawi	47,014	35.72%	79,774	60.60%	4,844	3.68%	131,632	97.23%	3,746	2.77%	135,378	87.50%	19,332	12.50%	154,710
North Kayong	26,277	48.18%	25,266	46.33%	2,991	5.48%	54,534	94.33%	3,275	5.67%	57,809	64.32%	32,074	35.68%	89,883
Kubu Raya	107,220	34.35%	143,255	45.90%	61,623	19.74%	312,098	95.24%	15,608	4.76%	327,706	73.80%	116,364	26.20%	444,070
Pontianak	118,144	46.68%	119,926	47.39%	15,009	5.93%	253,079	96.55%	9,045	3.45%	262,124	53.58%	227,084	46.42%	489,208
Singkawang	38,950	41.00%	48,944	51.52%	7,103	7.48%	94,997	95,63%	4,342	4.37%	99,339	57.72%	72,779	42.28%	172,118
Total	963,453	37.28%	1,364,563	52.80%	256,530	9.93%	2,584,546	95.90%	110,405	4.10%	2,694,951	68.11%	1,262,018	31.89%	3,956,969
Source: KPU

== Aftermath ==
Ria Norsan, who has partial Chinese ancestry from his mother's side, and Hidayat Arsani who won the 2024 Bangka Belitung Islands gubernatorial election, became the first Chinese Muslims to be elected governors in Indonesia. They, along with Sherly Tjoanda, who won the 2024 North Maluku gubernatorial election, created another historic milestone as the first Chinese Indonesians who were directly elected governors after failed attempts to reach this milestone by Basuki Tjahaja Purnama, who contested the 2007 Bangka Belitung Islands and the 2017 Jakarta gubernatorial elections.
