= SMA4 =

SMA4 may stand for:

- Spinal muscular atrophy (SMA) type 4
- Super Mario Advance 4: Super Mario Bros. 3
- SMA Negeri 4 Pontianak (Pontianak State High School #4), Pontianak, Indonesia

== See also ==
- SMA (disambiguation)
