= Ria Norsan =

Indonesian politician (born 1967)

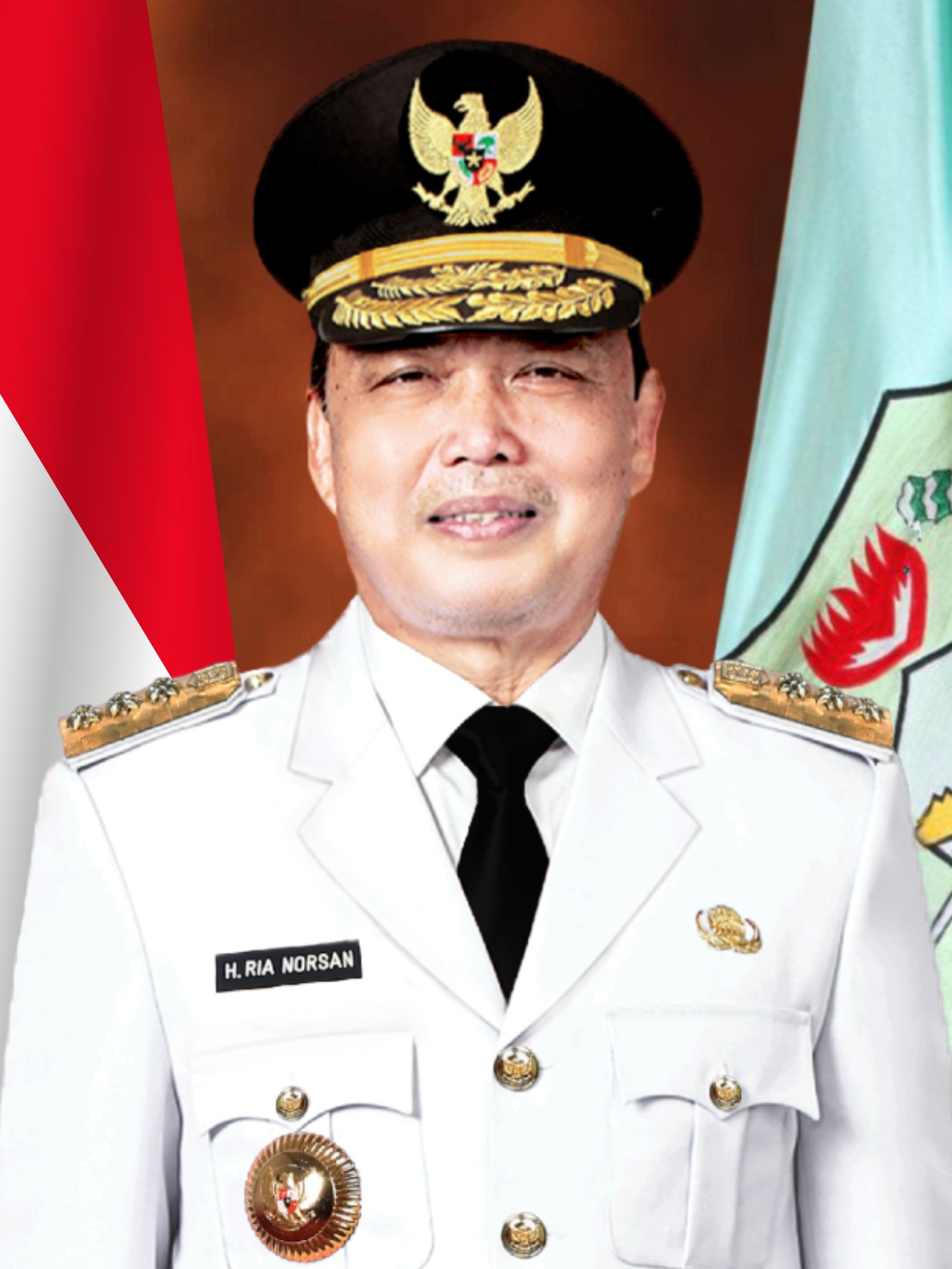
- Official portrait, 2025

Governor of West Kalimantan
- Incumbent
- Assumed office 20 February 2025
- President: Prabowo Subianto
- Deputy: Krisantus Kurniawan
- Preceded by: Sutarmidji; Harisson Azroi (acting)

Vice Governor of West Kalimantan
- In office 5 September 2018 – 5 September 2023
- Governor: Sutarmidji
- Preceded by: Christiandy Sanjaya
- Succeeded by: Krisantus Kurniawan

Regent of Mempawah
- In office 12 April 2008 – 4 September 2018
- Governor: Cornelis; Doddy Riyadmadji (acting)
- Deputy: Rubijanto (2009–2014); Gusti Ramlana (2014–2018)
- Preceded by: Agus Salim
- Succeeded by: Gusti Ramlana

Personal details
- Born: 17 December 1967 (age 58) Singkawang, West Kalimantan, Indonesia
- Party: Gerindra (since 2024)
- Other political affiliations: Golkar (until 2024)
- Spouse: Erlina Ria Norsan
- Children: 4
- Education: Panca Bhakti University; Tanjungpura University

Ria Norsan (born 17 December 1967) is an Indonesian politician who is the governor of West Kalimantan since February 2025. He had previously served as the province's vice governor under Sutarmidji between 2018 and 2023, and was the regent of Mempawah Regency between 2009 and 2018.

== Early life and education ==
Ria Norsan was born on 17 December 1967 in Singkawang, West Kalimantan to a Muslim family. His father was an Indonesian army corporal stationed in the local military district, while his mother is a housewife of Chinese ethnicity. He spent his childhood in Mempawah where he studied, due to his father's military career. He studied for a bachelor's degree at Tanjungpura University between 1990 and 1994, later also obtaining a master's degree from Tarumanegara University in 2000 and a doctorate from Tanjungpura in 2004.

== Career ==
Prior to entering university, he had worked as a civil servant in the provincial government, before later starting his own construction business as well as running an Ice pop shop.

=== Regent of Mempawah ===
He became affiliated with Golkar, and in 2008 he was elected as regent of Mempawah Regency. He was reelected for a second term in 2013. He was also elected as chairman of Golkar's West Kalimantan branch for the 2015–2020 term.

=== Vice Governor of West Kalimantan ===
In 2018, he ran as the running mate of Sutarmidji in the 2018 gubernatorial election. The pair won 1,334,512 votes (51.55%), and Sutarmidji and Norsan were sworn in as governor and vice governor on 5 September 2018.

=== Governor of West Kalimantan ===
He then ran as a gubernatorial candidate against Sutarmidji in the 2024 gubernatorial election and defeated Sutarmidji. He had run with the support of PDI-P, despite his party Golkar supporting Sutarmidji's bid. Due to this, Norsan was fired from Golkar provincial board in September 2024. Norsan's son, Arief Rinaldi (member of the provincial legislature from Golkar), announced Norsan's removal from his position as party board. Golkar provincial chairman Maman Abdurrahman clarified that Norsan was not fired from the party, confirming Norsan's own claim that he is still member of Golkar. Norsan was sworn in as governor on 20 February 2025.

== Family ==
Norsan is married to Erlina (b. 1969), and the couple has four children. After Norsan's tenure in Mempawah, Erlina was elected to the office in 2018, and she was reelected to a second term in 2024.
