= Sutarmidji =

Indonesian politician

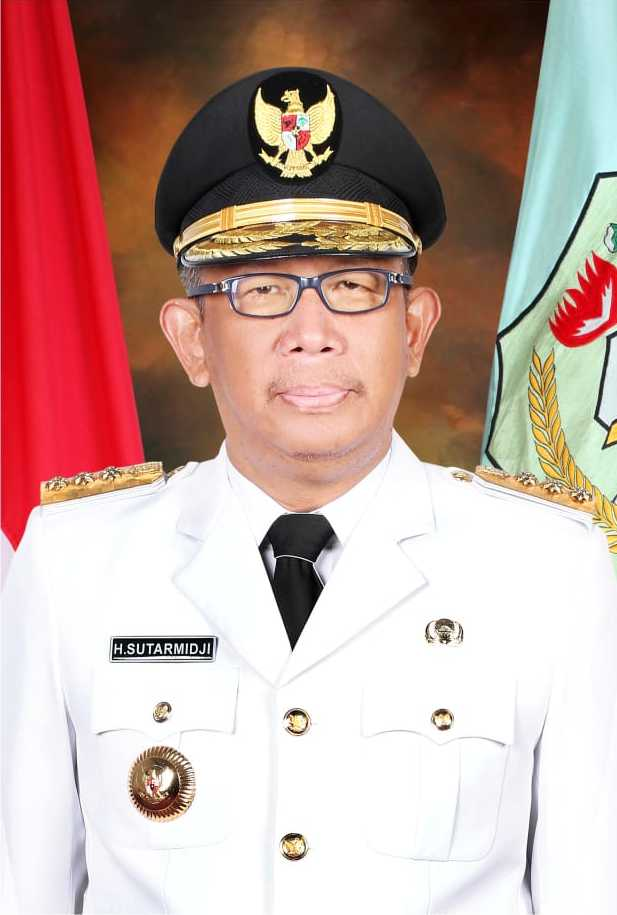

9th Governor of West Kalimantan
- In office 5 September 2018 – 5 September 2023
- Deputy: Ria Norsan
- Preceded by: Cornelis M.H.
- Succeeded by: Harisson Azroi (acting); Ria Norsan

Mayor of Pontianak
- In office 22 December 2008 – 5 September 2018
- Deputy: Paryadi; Edi Rusdi Kamtono
- Preceded by: Buchary Abdurrachman
- Succeeded by: Edi Rusdi Kamtono

Deputy Mayor of Pontianak
- In office 2003–2008
- Mayor: Buchary Abdurrachman

Member of Pontianak City Council
- In office 1997–2003

Personal details
- Born: 29 November 1962 (age 63) Pontianak, West Kalimantan
- Party: United Development Party
- Spouse: Lismaryani
- Children: 3
- Education: Tanjungpura University; University of Indonesia; Saint Paul Highschool Pontianak
- Website: bangmidji.com

Sutarmidji (born 29 November 1962) is an Indonesian politician of the United Development Party and academician who was the 9th governor of West Kalimantan, serving from 2018 to 2023. He was also formerly the mayor of its capital, Pontianak, between 2008 and 2018 and was its deputy mayor from 2003 to 2008 and a city councillor between 1997 and 2003. Prior to entering politics, he was a lecturer at Tanjungpura University.

== Background ==
Sutarmidji was born in Pontianak on 29 November 1962. He was the sixth child of nine, and his parents' names were Tahir Abubakar and Djaedah. His father used to be active in Masyumi and had worked in the Ministry of Religious Affairs. As a child, he used to be a newspaper hawker close to the mayor's office.

He completed his first 12 years of education all in Pontianak - at publicly operated SDN 54 (class of 1974) and SMPN 1 (class of 1977) for primary and middle school, and the Catholic high school SMA Santo Paulus (class of 1981). He continued his education, receiving a bachelor's degree in law from Tanjungpura University in 1986, and later a master's degree in humanities from University of Indonesia in 1993.

== Career ==
After earning his bachelor's degree, Sutarmidji began to work at Tanjungpura University as a lecturer in its faculty of law, a position he held between 1987 and 2000.

=== In Pontianak ===
Sutarmidji's work in politics began after he graduated from highschool in 1981, when he joined the United Development Party. In 1997, he was elected into the Pontianak City Council, despite both being a civil servant and not being a member of Golkar (membership of which was enforced for civil servants during the New Order). After the 1999 elections, he remained a member of the City Council. Later he served as deputy mayor under Buchary Abdurrachman. After winning the mayoral election of 2008 with 85,340 votes (34.47%), Sutarmidji was sworn in as mayor on 22 December 2008. Sutarmidji won his reelection in 2013, securing 139,061 votes (51.71%) in the six-candidate race while winning in all of Pontianak's subdistricts.

During his terms, he cut down on bureaucratic red tape by reducing the number of permits required and shortening the application process. The city's government also composed standard operating procedures for various tasks. He claimed that his changes were the cause of the increase in the city's annual income, from Rp 65 billion to 960 billion between 2009 and 2015. In healthcare, he abolished service tiers in the city's main public hospital, and established feeding centers for undernourished children. His budget-forming method, which involved a public announcement of the city's annual budget to the public for appraisal before assessment by the city council, was also praised by Indonesia Corruption Watch observers.

His tenure also saw city-funded renovation of traditional markets and houses in poor condition, enlargement of the city's roads and the establishment of two public parks for the city's inhabitants. The city also developed several tools in cooperation with startups and the private sector, including an application tracking pollution and tree locations called "SIPPohon" in October 2016. As Pontianak suffered from haze due to forest fires, the application was intended to allow residents to track the pollution levels and information on existing trees, including their size and carbon absorption capability. The city government intended to use the information to determine the location and quantity of vegetation needed to improve air quality. In addition, the city's government also released a native payment app called GencilPay (which is similar to China's Alipay) and a complaints app. With the GencilPay application, Pontianak residents could monitor the prices of groceries in the city's markets. The applications, and their use by the city government, won Smart City awards from the Bandung Institute of Technology in 2017.

In 2017, the Ministry of Home Affairs named him one of the best mayors in Indonesia, alongside Bandung mayor Ridwan Kamil and Surabaya mayor Tri Rismaharini. Pontianak was also named the city with the best public service in the country by the Indonesian Ombudsman in 2015. The city received a total of 231 awards from various organizations under his ten-year tenure.

=== As governor ===
Following the 2018 gubernatorial election, Sutarmidji defeated two other candidates, winning 1,334,512 votes (51.55%). He was sworn in on 5 September 2018. He promised that he would carry over his system from Pontianak in order to establish budget transparency in the province, while also demanding explanations for a Rp 600 billion (US$41 million) deficit in the 2018 provincial budget. By 20 September, he had removed the provincial secretary from his post, with the secretary having stated that he would not serve in his position if Sutarmidji was to become governor.

He attempted to run for a second term in 2024, but was defeated by his former deputy governor Ria Norsan.

== Personal life ==
Sutarmidji is married to Lismaryani, and the couple have three children. His daughter, Dytha Damayanti Pratiwi, was elected into Pontianak's city council in 2024.
