= Gregorius Herkulanus Bala =

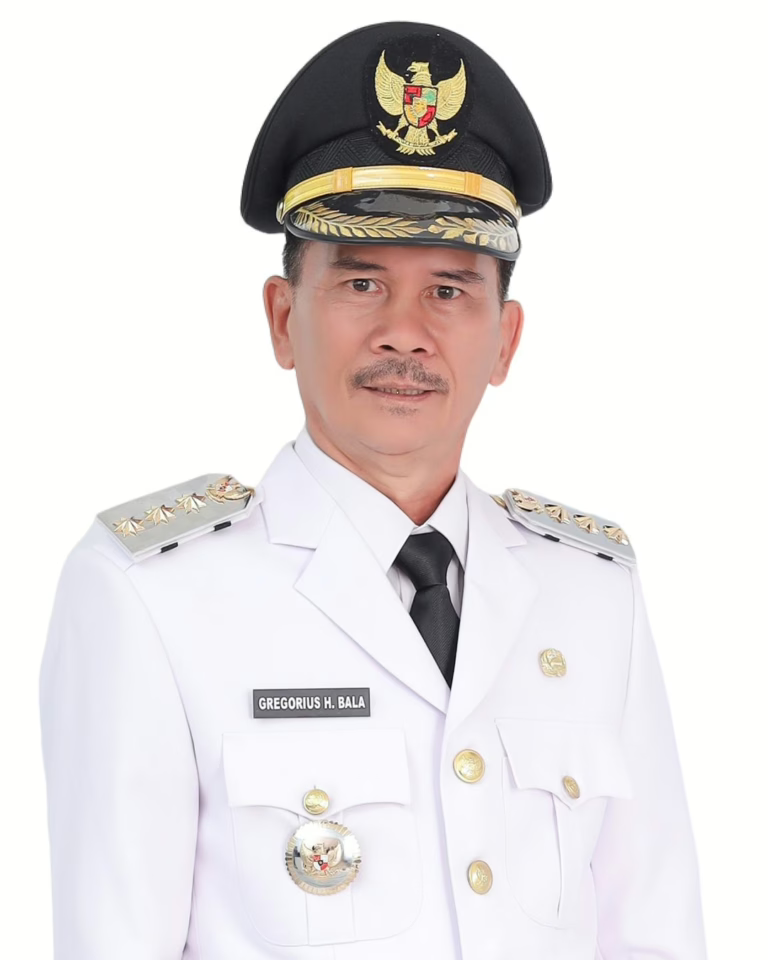

Regent of Sintang
- Incumbent
- Assumed office 20 February 2025
- Preceded by: Jarot Winarno

Personal details
- Born: 26 October 1969 (age 56) Sintang, Indonesia

Gregorius Herkulanus Bala (born 26 October 1969) is an Indonesian businessman and politician of the Gerindra party. He has served as the regent of Sintang, West Kalimantan since February 2025. He was previously a member of the West Kalimantan Regional House of Representatives between 2019 and 2024, and of Sintang's municipal DPRD from 2014 to 2019.

== Early life ==
Gregorius Herkulanus Bala was born on 26 October 1969 in the village of Luyuk, in present-day Sintang Regency. His last name Bala was taken from the local name of the common bamboo, abundant near his parents' home. After completing middle school, he moved to Sintang's regency seat – 12 hours by road or 2 days by boat from his home village – for high school. He worked odd jobs to support himself while at high school, including as a porter and massager. He graduated high school in 1988.

== Career ==
He continued to work odd jobs after graduating high school, including as a porter up until sometime after his marriage. He then worked as a truck driver, a merchant, a gold miner, and a fuel reseller. In 2006, his employer provided him with capital to start a rubber trading business, and Gregorius soon expanded to wild mushroom trading. By 2009, he had begun investing in oil palm plantations, and started a stone crushing plant which benefitted from the construction of a new airport and new rubber processing plants in Sintang.

In 2014, Gregorius ran for a seat in Sintang's Regional House of Representatives (DPRD) as a Gerindra Party member, and won a seat. In the following election in 2019, Gregorius ran for a seat in the provincial legislature of West Kalimantan, winning a seat after securing 16,867 votes. He would be reelected for a second term in the 2024 election.

Before he was sworn in for a second term, Gregorius opted to run in the 2024 regency election for Sintang. With Sintang's DPRD speaker Florensius Ronny from Nasdem as his running mate, Gregorius ran with the support of Gerindra, Nasdem, PKB, Perindo, and PSI. Gregorius and Ronny won the election with 102,046 votes (40.9%), and they were sworn in on 20 February 2025.

As regent, Gregorius launched a social security program for oil palm workers in Sintang funded by revenue shares from the palm companies.

== Personal life ==
Gregorius is a Catholic. He is married to Hermina.
