= Karolin Margret Natasa =

Indonesian politician

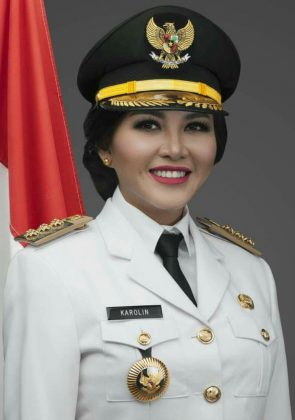

Regent of Landak
- In office 22 May 2017 – 22 May 2022
- Governor: Cornelis; Sutarmidji
- Preceded by: Adrianus Asia Sidot; Jakius Sinyor (acting)
- Succeeded by: Samuel (acting)

Member of People's Representative Council
- In office 1 October 2009 – 24 October 2016
- Constituency: West Kalimantan

Personal details
- Born: 12 March 1982 (age 44) Mempawah, West Kalimantan
- Party: PDI-P
- Education: Atmajaya University

Karolin Margret Natasa (born 12 March 1982) is an Indonesian politician who served as regent of Landak between 2017 and 2022. Previously, she had served as a member of the People's Representative Council.

The daughter of two-term governor Cornelis M.H., she was first elected into office in 2009, being re-elected to the national parliament in 2014. She is a graduate of Atma Jaya Catholic University of Indonesia. In 2018, she ran for governorship of West Kalimantan, but lost to Sutarmidji.

== Background ==
Karolin was born in Mempawah Regency of West Kalimantan on 12 March 1982 as the first child of Cornelis M.H., later two-term governor of West Kalimantan and Landak regent while her mother was an elementary school teacher. Completing elementary school in Sambas and both middle and high school in Pontianak, she proceeded to study general medicine at Atma Jaya Catholic University of Indonesia in Jakarta, starting in 2004 and graduating in 2007.

Natasa is a Catholic of Dayak descent (of mixed Iban-Bidayuh ancestry, the two tribes dominating the Sanggau Regency of West Kalimantan province), and is married to Andreas Quinn.

== Career ==
During her studies, she was active in the university's Catholic students association, becoming its secretary general. After graduating, she worked as a government doctor.

Prior to being elected into office, she participated in the campaign teams for the Landak regency election and her father's successful bid for governorship of West Kalimantan in 2008. She is a member of Indonesian Democratic Party of Struggle (PDI-P).

=== Parliament ===
She was first elected into the People's Representative Council in 2009, when she ran from her home constituency of West Kalimantan and won 222,021 votes, placing first in the province/constituency and third nationally. She was reelected in 2014, when she won 397,481 votes from the same constituency - the most of any legislative candidate in the country, placing ahead of other PDI-P candidates such as Puan Maharani and I Wayan Koster.

During her entire time in the council, she was part of the ninth commission on demography, health, labor and transmigration. In 2012, a scandal arose related to a pornographic clip in which she was suspected to have participated, resulting in a hearing with the council's dignity body (Badan Kehormatan). She denied any wrongdoing, claiming that the case was made up due to her father's 2013 reelection campaign.

=== Regent ===
In 2017, she participated in Landak Regency's local election as a single candidate with Herculanus Heriyadi as her running mate, winning 96.86 percent of the votes. She was sworn in on 22 May 2017 by her father, becoming the regency's first female regent, the first female Dayak to serve as a regional head in Indonesia, and the first local leader in the province to win in an uncontested local election.

In order to become a regent, she resigned from her office in the People's Representative Council.

Just months after becoming regent, she registered to run in the 2018 gubernatorial elections for West Kalimantan with Bengkayang regent Suryadman Gidot as her running mate and three parties (PDI-P, Demokrat, PKPI) backing her. With 41.8% of votes, the pair lost to the Sutarmidji/Ria Norsan pair, however. Her tenure ended on 22 May 2022, and Samuel, a senior provincial civil servant, was sworn in as acting regent in her place.
