= Tanjungpura University =

Public university in Indonesia

Coordinates: 0.058°S 109.347°E

- Universitas Tanjungpura
- Seal of the Tanjungpura University
- Type: Public
- Established: 20 May 1959
- Rector: Prof. Dr. H. Garuda Wiko, S.H., M.Si.
- Location: Pontianak, West Kalimantan, Indonesia
- Website: www.untan.ac.id

Tanjungpura University (Indonesian: Universitas Tanjungpura) or UNTAN is a public university in the city of Pontianak in West Kalimantan, Indonesia.

Hamzah Haz, former Indonesian vice president, once taught at the university.

== History ==
It was established as the private, government-accredited University of National Power (Universitas Daya Nasional) on 20 May 1959, with Law and Business Administration faculties, and became a public university 16 May 1963. On 20 May 1963, the name was changed to State University of Pontianak (Universitas Negeri Pontianak). On 14 September 1965 the name changed again, to Dwikora University (Universitas Dwikora) (Dwikora, short for Dwi Komando Rakyat, was a reference to the Indonesian 'konfrontasi' with Malaysia). At this time, the Faculty of Social and Political Sciences was opened.

On 15 August 1967, the final name change was effected, to Tanjungpura University, a reference to the Tanjungpura Kingdom that once ruled the area.

== Faculties ==
- Law
- Economics and Business
- Agriculture
- Engineering
- Social and Political Sciences
- Teacher Training and Education
- Forestry
- Mathematics and Natural Sciences
- Medicine
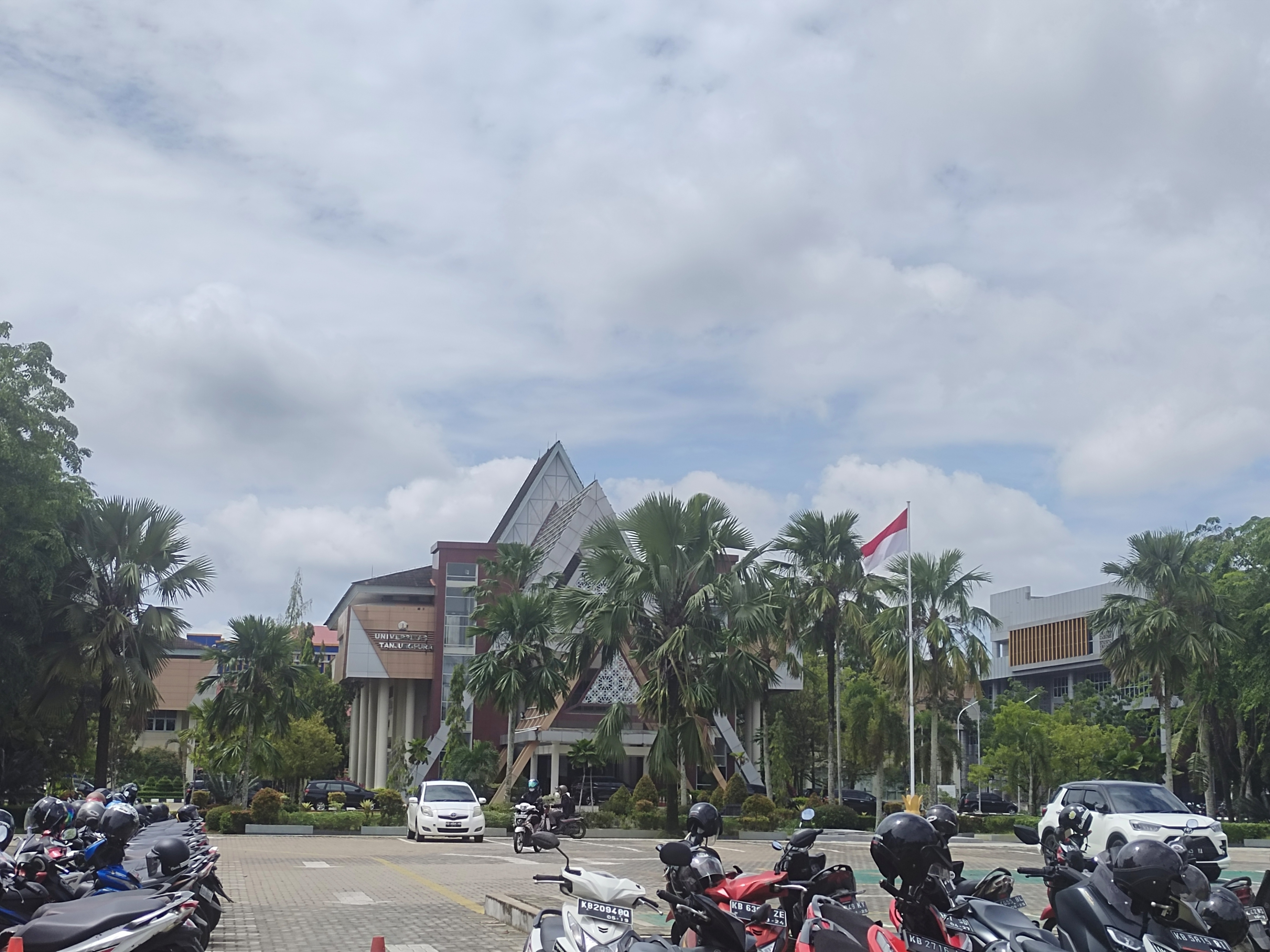
Rectorate of Tanjungpura University.

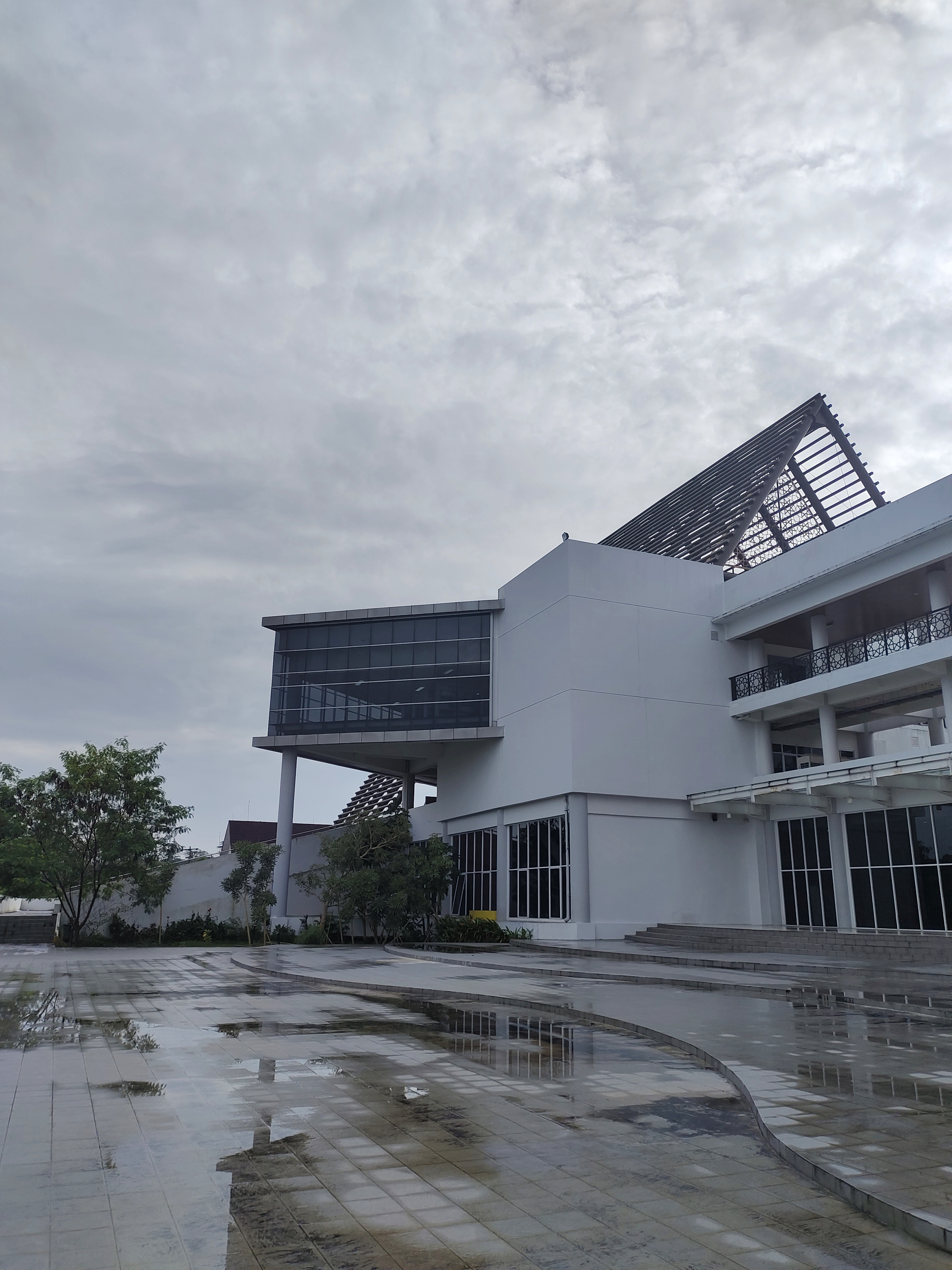
Main Library building of Tanjungpura University.

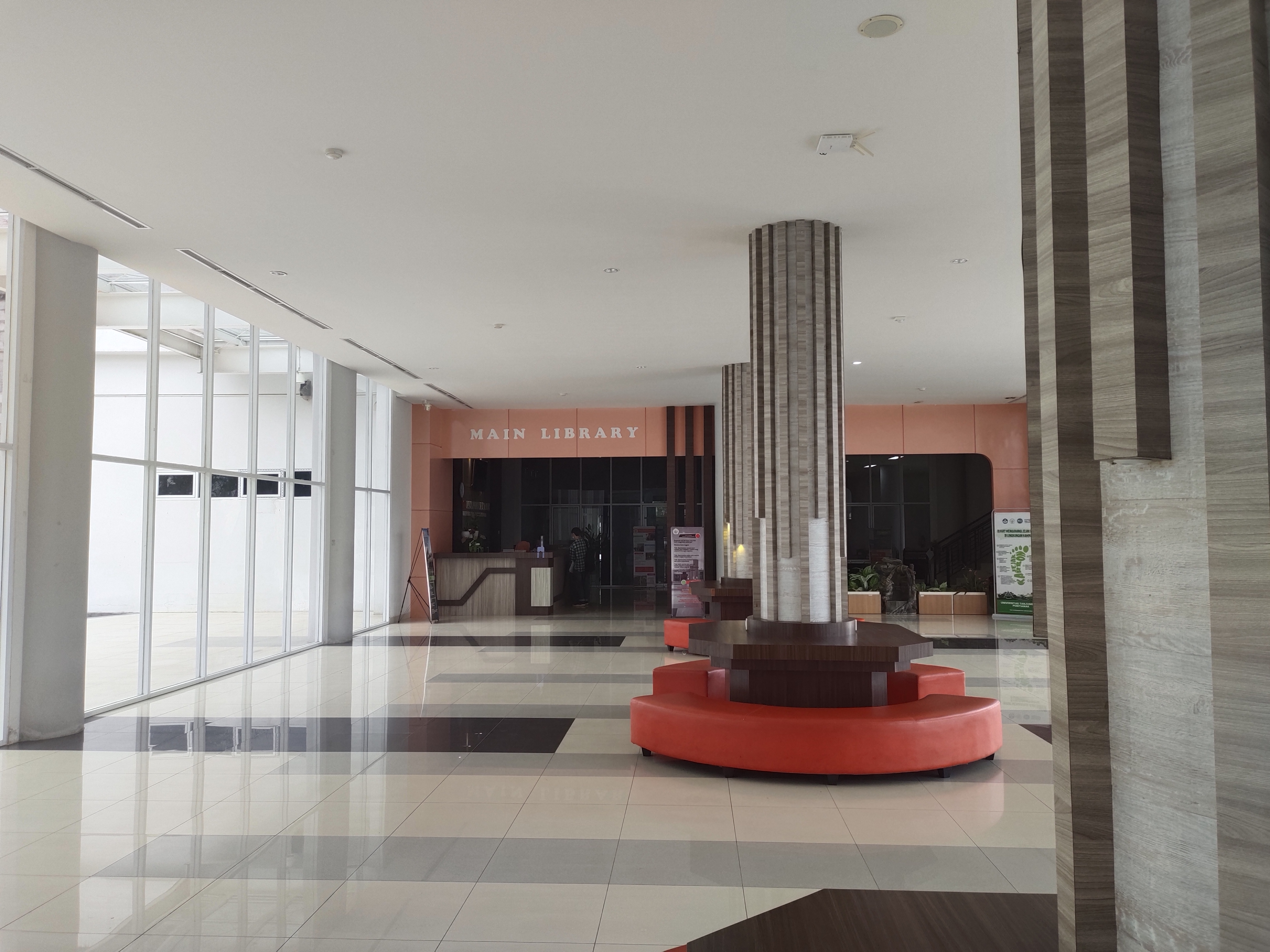
Inside of the Main Library.
