= SMA Negeri 4 Pontianak =

- Jl. DR. Wahidin Sudiro Husodo; Pontianak

Information
- Type: Public (Negeri)
- Established: December 8, 1977
- Principal: Fatmawati, Mpd
- Nickname: Tetra
- Website: sman4pontianak.sch.id

Sekolah Menengah Atas Negeri 4 Pontianak (English: Pontianak State (Note: Negeri) High School (Note: Sekolah Menengah Atas) #4) is one of the Public Schools in the Province of West Kalimantan, Indonesia.

== Accreditation ==
At the national level, SMA Negeri 4 Pontianak achieved "A" accreditation from Badan Akreditasi Nasional.

== Extracurricular activities ==
SMA Negeri 4 Pontianak has more than 22 extracurricular programs for its students. Each student must pick one (required for X grade) in addition to their studies. For example:

- Basketball
- Futsal
- Volleyball
- English Study Club
- Modern/traditional dance
- Bridge

== See also ==
- Education in Indonesia
- List of schools in Indonesia
