= West Kalimantan Regional House of Representatives =

Unicameral legislature of the Indonesian province of West Kalimantan

West Kalimantan Province Regional House of Representatives Dewan Perwakilan Rakyat Daerah Provinsi Kalimantan Barat

Type
- Type: Unicameral
- Term limits: 5 years

History
- New session started: 25 November 2024

Leadership
- Speaker: Aloysius, PDI-P since 25 November 2024
- Deputy Speaker: Hadijah Fitriah, NasDem since 25 November 2024
- Deputy Speaker: Nofal Nofiendra, Gerindra since 25 November 2024
- Deputy Speaker: Prabasa Anantatur, Golkar since 25 November 2024

Structure
- Seats: 65
- Political groups: Government (19): PDI-P (13); Hanura (4); PPP (2); Supported by (24): NasDem (10); Gerindra (9); PAN (5); Opposition (22): Golkar (9); Demokrat (6); PKB (5); PKS (2)

Elections
- Voting system: Open list proportional representation
- Last general election: 14 February 2024
- Next general election: 2029

Meeting place
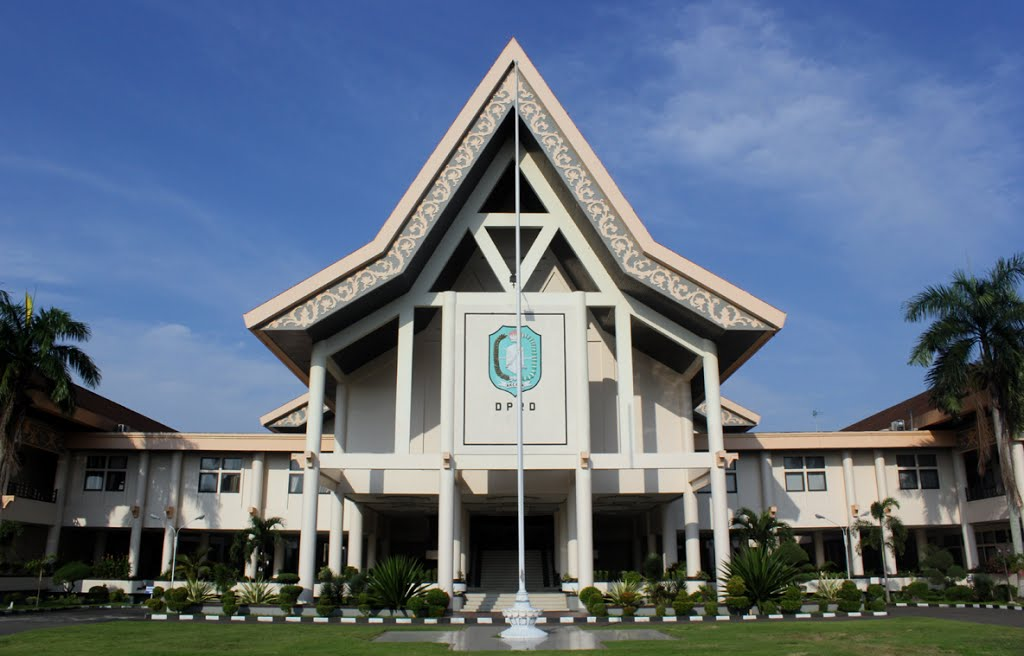
- West Kalimantan Provincial DPRD Building; Pontianak, West Kalimantan, Indonesia

Website
- http://www.dprd-kalbarprov.go.id/

The West Kalimantan Regional House of Representatives (Indonesian: Dewan Perwakilan Rakyat Daerah Provinsi Kalimantan Barat, abbreviated to DPRD Kalbar) is the unicameral legislature of the Indonesian province of West Kalimantan. It is composed of 65 members elected via party lists in the 2024 general election. Elections are held every five years and are conducted simultaneously with the nationwide legislative election.

It convenes in the Gedung DPRD Kalimantan Barat, South East Pontianak District, Pontianak City.

== Composition ==
Legislative period	Golkar	PDI-P	PPP	PAN	PKB	PD	PKS	Hanura	Gerindra	Nasdem	PKPI	Total
2014-2019	9	15	4	6	2	9	2	3	7	5	3	65

== Speaker and Deputy Speakers ==
- Speaker: Aloysius (PDI-P)
- Deputy Speakers
  - Deputy Speaker 1: Hadijah Fitriah (NasDem)
  - Deputy Speaker 2: Nofal Nofiendra (Gerindra)
  - Deputy Speaker 3: Prabasa Anantatur (Golkar)
