= Sintang Regency =

Regency in West Kalimantan, Indonesia

Sintang Regency Kabupaten Sintang
- Regency
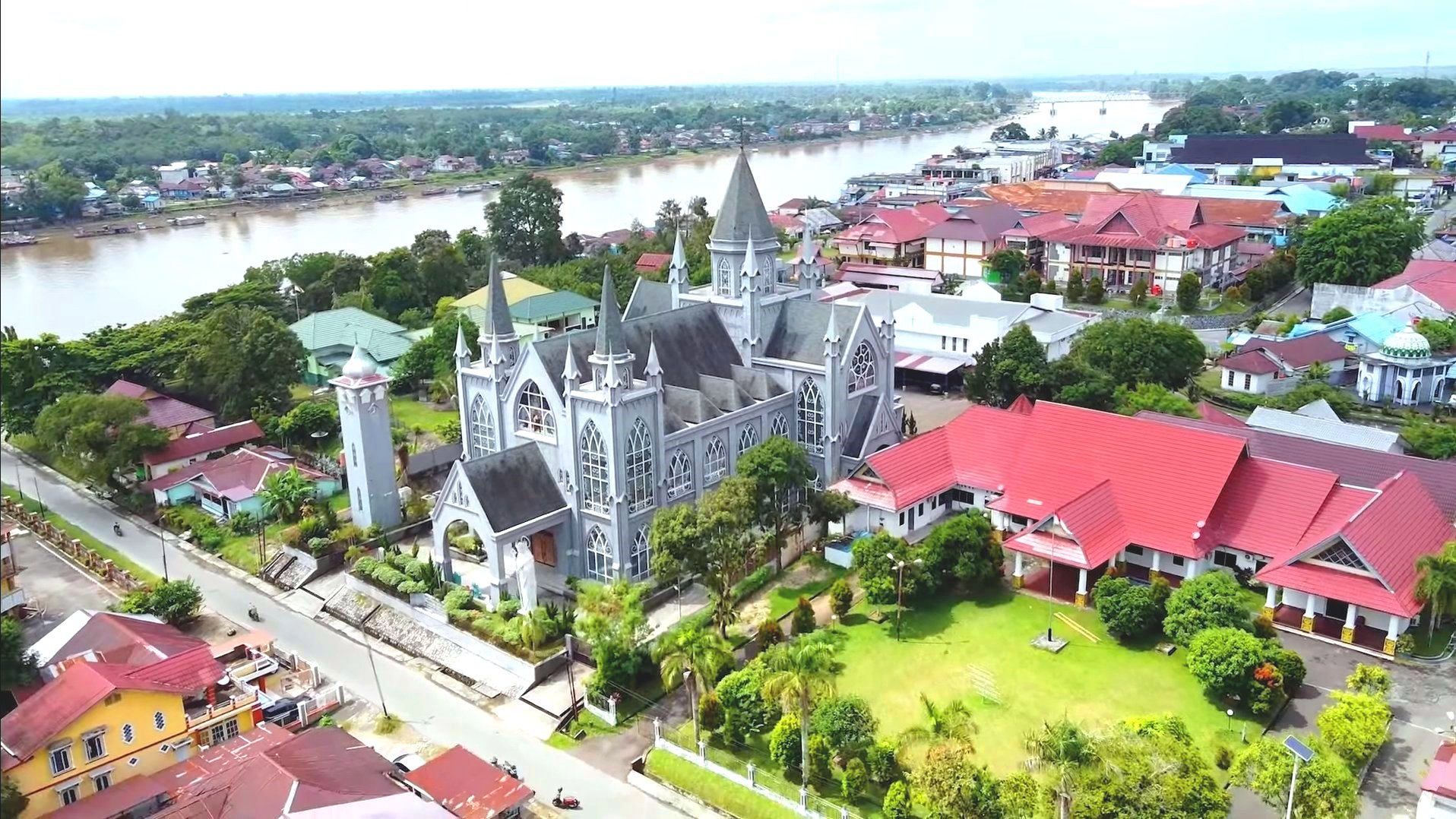
- Sintang cathedral

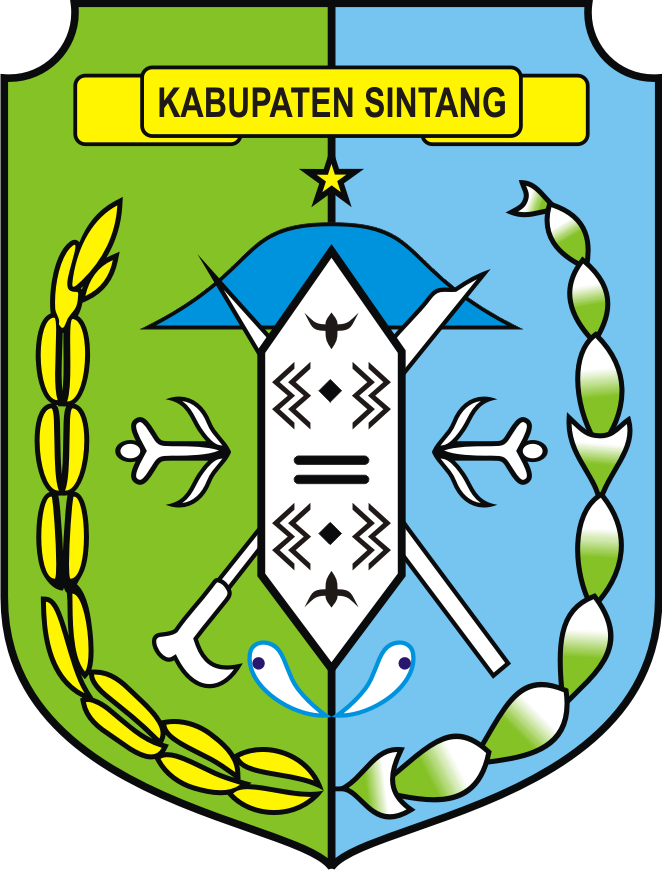
- Coat of arms

- Location within West Kalimantan

- Location in Kalimantan and Indonesia Sintang Regency (Indonesia)
- Coordinates: 0°04′05″N 111°29′53″E
- Country: Indonesia
- Province: West Kalimantan
- Regency seat: Sintang

Government
  - Regent: Gregorius Herkulanus Bala
  - Vice Regent: Florensius Ronny

Area
  - Total: 16,517.85 km^{2} (6,377.58 sq mi)

Population (mid 2025 estimate)
  - Total: 449,211
  - Density: 27.1955/km^{2} (70.4360/sq mi)
- Time zone: UTC+7 (IWST)
- Area code: (+62) 565
- HDI (2021): ▲0.669 (Medium)
- Website: sintang.go.id

Sintang Regency is a regency of West Kalimantan province of Indonesia. It covers an area of 18,517.85 km^{2}, and had a population of 364,759 at the 2010 Census and 421,306 at the 2020 Census; the official estimate as at mid 2025 was 449,211 (comprising 231,411 males and 217,800 females).

Sintang Regency is one of the few Indonesian regencies having a land border with another country (in this case, with Malaysia). It is also the third largest regency in the province by land area after Kapuas Hulu Regency and Ketapang Regency. The regency was formerly the site of the Sintang Kingdom, a Hindu kingdom that later converted to Islam and which was a regional power in the interior of Borneo Island. The regency seat is located at the large town of Sintang, which with over 87,000 residents in mid 2025, is among the biggest settlements in Borneo's interior alongside Putussibau and Puruk Cahu.

== History ==
Somewhere between 45,000 and 39,000 B.C. the Sintang area was first inhabited by humans. The area changed hands several times from the Majapahit to the Bruneian Sultanate, but the local State of Sintang was ruled by Princes, who became Sultans when converted to Islam in 1672. When the Dutch arrived at Borneo in 1776 the area was quickly occupied by the Dutch.

The area was occupied by the Empire of Japan in 1941 as a result of WW2, and then was liberated in 1945. This was followed by Indonesian Independence.

== Geography ==
=== Climate ===
Sintang, the seat of the regency has a tropical rainforest climate (Af) with heavy to very heavy rainfall year-round.

Climate data for Sintang (Susilo Airport) (1991–2020 normals, extremes 1999–2023)
Month	Jan	Feb	Mar	Apr	May	Jun	Jul	Aug	Sep	Oct	Nov	Dec	Year
Record high °C (°F)	35.4 (95.7)	36.1 (97.0)	35.8 (96.4)	36.3 (97.3)	36.2 (97.2)	36.2 (97.2)	36.8 (98.2)	36.2 (97.2)	38.8 (101.8)	35.8 (96.4)	35.0 (95.0)	37.4 (99.3)	38.8 (101.8)
Mean daily maximum °C (°F)	31.7 (89.1)	32.1 (89.8)	32.6 (90.7)	32.9 (91.2)	32.9 (91.2)	32.9 (91.2)	32.6 (90.7)	32.8 (91.0)	32.4 (90.3)	32.2 (90.0)	32.3 (90.1)	32.1 (89.8)	32.5 (90.4)
Daily mean °C (°F)	26.6 (79.9)	26.8 (80.2)	27.0 (80.6)	27.3 (81.1)	27.5 (81.5)	27.3 (81.1)	27.0 (80.6)	27.3 (81.1)	27.2 (81.0)	27.0 (80.6)	26.9 (80.4)	26.7 (80.1)	27.1 (80.7)
Mean daily minimum °C (°F)	23.2 (73.8)	23.1 (73.6)	23.3 (73.9)	23.5 (74.3)	23.8 (74.8)	23.5 (74.3)	23.0 (73.4)	23.1 (73.6)	23.2 (73.8)	23.3 (73.9)	23.3 (73.9)	23.2 (73.8)	23.3 (73.9)
Record low °C (°F)	20.0 (68.0)	19.0 (66.2)	21.4 (70.5)	21.0 (69.8)	21.0 (69.8)	21.0 (69.8)	18.7 (65.7)	20.0 (68.0)	18.1 (64.6)	21.2 (70.2)	21.0 (69.8)	21.0 (69.8)	18.1 (64.6)
Average precipitation mm (inches)	282.0 (11.10)	236.9 (9.33)	268.0 (10.55)	269.4 (10.61)	223.1 (8.78)	195.5 (7.70)	189.5 (7.46)	168.4 (6.63)	209.0 (8.23)	255.6 (10.06)	307.6 (12.11)	302.8 (11.92)	2,907.8 (114.48)
Average precipitation days (≥ 1.0 mm)	17.8	14.6	16.0	16.7	13.9	11.8	10.7	10.1	11.7	16.6	19.2	19.0	178.1
Mean monthly sunshine hours	115.8	128.3	149.1	164.9	170.9	175.7	179.7	196.9	136.2	154.6	135.4	108.5	1,816
Source 1: Starlings Roost Weather
Source 2: World Meteorological Organization

== Administrative districts ==
Following the separation of the former southern part (eleven districts) to form the separate Melawi Regency on 18 December 2003, the residual Sintang Regency consists of fourteen districts (kecamatan), tabulated below with their areas and their populations at the 2010 Census and 2020 Census, together with their official estimates as at mid 2025. The table also includes the locations of the district administrative centres, the number of administrative villages in each district (totalling 390 rural desa and 16 urban kelurahan - the latter all in Sintang District), and its post code.

Kode Wilayah	Name of District (kecamatan)	Area in km^{2}	Pop'n 2010 Census	Pop'n 2020 Census	Pop'n mid 2025 Estimate	Admin centre	No. of villages	Post code
61.05.14	Serawai	2,537.40	23,023	22,771	22,985	Nanga Serawai	38	78683
61.05.15	Ambalau	5,992.33	12,867	13,259	13,354	Nanga Kemangai	33	78684
61.05.09	Kayan Hulu	1,789.32	21,854	22,758	23,038	Nanga Tebidah	31	78694
61.05.03	Sepauk	1,462.74	46,407	53,251	56,498	Nanga Sepauk	39	78662
61.05.02	Tempunak	865.29	26,860	30,163	31,670	Nanga Tempunak	26	78661
61.05.20	Sungai Tebelian	598.09	29,144	34,679	37,446	Sungai Ukoi	26	78655
61.05.01	Sintang	347.56	59,410	77,319	87,188	Sintang (town)	29 ^{(a)}	78611: 78619
61.05.07	Dedai	607.72	27,573	30,127	31,216	Penyak Lalang (Nanga Dedai)	31	78691
61.05.08	Kayan Hilir	1,058.14	24,423	27,562	29,008	Nanga Mau	43	78693
61.05.19	Kelam Permai	640.57	15,276	18,433	20,039	Kebong	17	78656
61.05.21	Binjai Hulu	391.93	11,332	13,910	15,248	Binjai Hulu	11	78663
61.05.04	Ketungau Hilir	1,671.03	20,567	24,100	25,830	Nanga Ketungau	24	78652
61.05.05	Katungau Tengah (Central Ketungau)	2,004.73	27,421	30,413	31,741	Nanga Merakai	29	78653
61.05.06	Ketungau Hulu	2,002.26	19,703	22,561	23,912	Senaning	29	78654
	Totals	18,517.85	364,759	421,306	449,211	Sintang	406	

Note: (a) comprising 16 urban kelurahan (Akcaya, Alai, Batu Lalau, Kapuas Kanan Hilir, Kapuas Kanan Hulu, Kapuas Kiri Hilir, Kapuas Kiri Hulu, Kedabang, Ladang, Mekar Jaya, Mengkurai, Menyumbung Tengah, Rawa Mambok, Sengkuang, Tanjung Puri and Ulak Jaya) and 13 desa.

== Education ==
There are 193 kindergartens, 456 elementary schools, 142 junior high schools, and 44 senior high schools. In addition, there are 18 vocational high schools. The regency has a total of 10 universities and higher education institutions as of 2020, most of which are located in the town of Sintang. One of the most notable in the regency is Kapuas Sintang University, located in Sintang District. The university is private and located close to the Kapuas River. It was previously known as Panca Bhakti Teaching and Education College before becoming a university. Muhammadiyah University in Pontianak also has a campus branch in Sintang, which is also private. Other colleges in the regency include Christian theological schools such as Sintang Khatulistiwa Theological College, Injili Setia Sintang Theological College, Kapuas Raya Christian College, and Immanuel Sintang Kalbar Theological College. In addition, there is a public academy owned by the West Kalimantan provincial government and one private Islamic college, Ma'arif Sintang Islamic College.

The regency government also runs a regional library, located in the town of Sintang.

== Bibliography ==
- Fienieg, Anouk, Sejarah Sintang - The History of Sintang : A Collection of Books, Manuscripts, Archives and Articles, 2007
