= West Kalimantan =

Province in Kalimantan, Indonesia

West Kalimantan Kalimantan Barat
- Province
- Province of West Kalimantan; Provinsi Kalimantan Barat
- Coat of arms
- Nickname: Provinsi Seribu Sungai "Province of the Thousand Rivers"
- Motto: Akçaya (Sanskrit) "Imperishable"
- West Kalimantan in Indonesia
- Interactive map of West Kalimantan
- Coordinates: 0°0′N 110°30′E
- Country: Indonesia
- Region: Kalimantan (Western Indonesia)
- Established: 14 July 1950
- Capital and largest city: Pontianak

Government
  - Body: West Kalimantan Provincial Government
  - Governor: Ria Norsan (Gerindra)
  - Vice Governor: Krisantus Kurniawan
  - Legislature: West Kalimantan Regional House of Representatives (DPRD)

Area
  - Total: 147,018.06 km^{2} (56,763.99 sq mi)
  - Rank: 2nd in Indonesia

Population (mid 2025 estimate)
  - Total: 5,766,030
  - Rank: 15th in Indonesia
  - Density: 39.2199/km^{2} (101.579/sq mi)

Demographics
  - Ethnic groups (2010): 34.93% Dayak; 33.84% Malays; 9.74% Javanese; 8.17% Chinese; 6.27% Madurese; 7.04% other
  - Religion (2021): 60,07% Islam: 33,74% Christianity; 22,16% Catholicism; 11,58% Protestantism; 5,85% Buddhism; 0,26% Confucianism; 0,05% Hinduism; 0,03% Aliran Kepercayaan
  - Languages: Indonesian (official), Bukar Sadong, Hakka, Iban, Jagoi, Kendayan, Jangkang, Pontianak Malay, Sambas Malay, Teochew, Biatah, Taman, Embaloh, Tringgus (regional)
- Time zone: UTC+7 (Indonesia Western Time)
- ISO 3166 code: ID-KB
- GDP (nominal): 2022
- Total: Rp 255.8 trillion (17th); US$ 17.2 billion Int$ 53.8 billion (PPP)
- Per capita: Rp 46.2 million (24th); US$ 3,109; Int$ 9,701 (PPP)
- Growth: ▲5.07%
- HDI (2024): ▲0.712 (31st) – high
- Website: kalbarprov.go.id

West Kalimantan (Indonesian: Kalimantan Barat, Jawi: کليمنتن بارت) is a province of Indonesia. It is one of five Indonesian provinces comprising Kalimantan, the Indonesian part of the island of Borneo. Its capital and largest city is Pontianak. It is bordered by East Kalimantan and Central Kalimantan to the east, the Malaysian state of Sarawak to the north, and the Bangka Belitung Islands to the west and the Java Sea to the south. The province has an area of 147,018 km^{2}, and had a population of 4,395,983 at the 2010 Census and 5,414,390 at the 2020 Census; the official estimate as at mid 2025 was 5,766,030 (comprising 2,957,074 males and 2,808,956 females), and was projected to rise to 5,834,955 at mid 2026.

Ethnic groups include the Dayak, Malay, Chinese, Javanese, Bugis, and Madurese. The borders of West Kalimantan roughly trace the mountain ranges surrounding the vast watershed of the Kapuas River, which drains most of the province. The province shares land borders with Central Kalimantan to the southeast, East Kalimantan to the east, and the Malaysian state of Sarawak to the north.

West Kalimantan is nicknamed "The Province of a Thousand Rivers". The nickname references the geography of the province, which features hundreds of rivers of varying size, most of which are navigable. Several major rivers are still the main route for freight to the hinterland, despite road infrastructure now reaching most districts.

Although a small part of West Kalimantan region is seawater, West Kalimantan has dozens of large and small islands (mostly uninhabited) spread along the Karimata Strait and Natuna Sea that borders the province of Riau Islands. The total population in the province, according to the 2010 census totalled 4,395,983 inhabitants and at the 2020 Census it was 5,414,390, but by mid 2025 it was officially estimated to have reached 5,766,030.

== History ==
The history of West Kalimantan was dominated with Hindu and Buddhist kingdoms ruling over the region and Borneo as a whole after that this kingdoms converted into muslim sultanate.

Its modern history in 17th century. The Malays are the native Muslims of West Kalimantan and established their Sultanates of Sambas since 1609 in Sambas territory, along with Mempawah Sultanate established since 1740 ruled in between Pontianak and Sambas territory. The Mempawah Sultanate brought in workers from China at the beginning of the kingdom. The same policy followed by the Sambas Sultanate around 1750, which brought in workers from China to work in the gold mines in the area.

The high Chinese population in this province was due to a republic founded by Chinese miners called the Lanfang Republic (蘭芳共和國: Republik Lanfang), an autonomous state allied with Pontianak and Sambas Sultanate, as a sub-state of the Qing. The government of Lanfang was ended in West Kalimantan after the Dutch Invasion in 1884.

West Kalimantan was under Japanese occupation from 1942 to 1945, when Indonesia declared its Independence. During the Japanese occupation, more than 21,000 people in Pontianak (including sultans, men, women and children) were kidnapped, tortured and massacred by Japanese troops during the Pontianak incidents. All the Malay Sultans on Kalimantan were executed and the Malay elite was devastated by the Japanese. Most of the victims were buried in several giant wells in Mandor (88 km from Pontianak). After the end of the war, Japanese officers in Pontianak were arrested by allied troops and brought in the International Military Tribunal for the Far East.

A monument called Makam Juang Mandor was created to memorialize the event.

Historical population
Year	Pop.	±%
1971	2,019,936	—
1980	2,486,068	+23.1%
1990	3,229,153	+29.9%
1995	3,635,730	+12.6%
2000	4,034,178	+11.0%
2005	4,052,345	+0.5%
2010	4,395,983	+8.5%
2015	4,783,209	+8.8%
2020	5,414,390	+13.2%
2025	5,766,030	+6.5%
Source: Badan Pusat Statistik 2026 and earlier

On 12 May 1947, the West Kalimantan Autonomous region was established. It was led by Syarif Hamid II of Pontianak, who supported the Dutch endeavour to establish a federal United States of Indonesia (RUSI), of which West Kalimantan would have been a component. Following the 5 April 1950 arrest of Sultan Hamid for complicity in the APRA coup attempt against the RUSI government led by Royal Netherlands East Indies Army (KNIL) officer Raymond Westerling, there were demands from the public for a merger into the Republic of Indonesia, which took place on 22 April. On 15 August, The West Kalimantan autonomous region became part of Kalimantan Province, and two days later, the RUSI ceased to exist, and was replaced with a unitary Republic of Indonesia.

West Kalimantan was the site of substantial fighting during the Indonesia-Malaysia confrontation under the Sukarno government in the mid-1960s. After Suharto deposed Sukarno in 1965, the confrontation was quickly resolved. Domestic conflict continued, however, for another ten years between the new Suharto government and fighters organized during the confrontation and backed by the banned Indonesian Communist Party (PKI). In 1967, Dayak locals waged a campaign of ethnic cleansing against the ethnic Chinese in the interior regions, with support from the Indonesian military, who believed the Chinese were aiding the communists. Thousands of Chinese were killed in the massacres, and tens of thousands became refugees.

Many Madurese migrants moved into the former Chinese lands, leading to renewed ethnic rivalries with the local population. These tensions eventually culminated in major eruptions of violence in 1996-1997 during the Sanggau Ledo riots and in 1999 during the Sambas riots. Hundreds of people, mostly Madurese, were killed during the riots and tens of thousands of Madurese became refugees. These riots also resulted in the ethnic cleansing of the Madurese from the Sambas region.

== Geography ==
=== Boundary ===
West Kalimantan Province is located in the western part of the island of Borneo, or in between the lines 2°08'N and 3°05'S and between 108°0'E and 114°10'E. The province is traversed by the Equator (latitude 0°), precisely through the city of Pontianak. West Kalimantan has a tropical climate, with often high temperatures accompanied by high humidity.

Other specific characteristics are that the West Kalimantan region is one of the provinces in Indonesia which has a land border with another country, namely the State of Sarawak, East Malaysia. Even with this position, West Kalimantan is currently the only province in Indonesia that have officially has an access road to get in and out of a neighbouring country. West Kalimantan and Sarawak have open roads approximately 400 km long, spanning Pontianak-Entikong-Kuching (Sarawak, Malaysia) and can be reached about six to eight hours of travel. In the northern part of the province, there are four regencies that directly borders Malaysia, namely Sambas, Sanggau, Sintang, and Kapuas Hulu, which stretch along with the Kalingkang Mountains-Kapuas Hulu.

Most of West Kalimantan is low-lying land, with a total area of 147,018 km^{2}, or 7.53 percent of the total Indonesian land area or 1.13 times the size of the island of Java. This region stretches straight from north to south along more than 600 km and about 850 km from west to east. Following the splitting up of the former unified Papua province, West Kalimantan is Indonesia's second largest province by area, after Central Kalimantan (153,430.36 km^{2}). The largest regency is Kapuas Hulu (31,318 km^{2} or 21.3 percent of the provincial area), followed by Ketapang (30,012 km^{2} or 20.4 percent) and Sintang (22,026 km^{2} or 15.0 percent), with the rest spread over the nine other regencies and two cities.

=== Topology ===
In general, West Kalimantan land is low-lying and has hundreds of rivers are safe when navigable, slightly hilly which extend from west to east along the valley Kapuas and Natuna Sea / Strait Karimata. Most of the land area is a swampy mix of peat and mangrove forests. The land area is flanked by two mountain ranges, namely, Kalingkang Mountains in the North and the Schwaner Mountains in the south along the border with the province of Central Kalimantan. Judging from the soil texture, the majority of West Kalimantan's area consists of the soil type PMK (podsolic red-yellow), which covers an area of about 10.5 million hectares, or 17.28 per cent of the total area of 14.7 million hectares. Next, the ground OGH (organosol, gley and hummus) and the alluvial soil of about 2.0 million hectares, or 10.29 per cent sprawled across Dati II, but most likely in the coastal district.

Influenced by the vast lowlands, the heights of the mountains are relatively low as well as non-volcanically active. The highest mountain is Mount Baturaya in Serawai District of Sintang Regency which has an altitude of 2,278 metres above sea level, far lower than Mount Semeru (East Java, 3,676 metres) or Mount Kerinci (Jambi, 3,805 metres).

Mount Lawit is located in Kapuas Hulu District, Embaloh Hulu and more formerly known in West Kalimantan. It only is the third highest because it has a high 1,767 metres, while the second highest is Mount Batusambung (in Ambalau District) with a height of up to 1,770 metres.

=== Lakes and Rivers ===
West Kalimantan is an area that could be called "The Thousand Rivers Province". The nickname is in line with the geographical conditions that have hundreds of large and small rivers, among others, which can be and often are navigable. Several major rivers are still the lifeblood and mainline to transport the countryside, although the road infrastructure has been able to reach most districts.

The longest river is the Kapuas River(or sungai Kapuas), which is the longest river in Indonesia (1,086 km), along which 942 km are navigable. Other great rivers are the Melawi, (navigable 471 km), Pawan (197 km), Kendawangan (128 km), Jelai (135 km), Sekadau (117 km), Sambas (233 km ), and Landak (178 km).

Although rivers are very numerous in West Kalimantan, there are only two significant lakes in the province. These are Lake Sentarum and Lake Luar I, which are in Kapuas Hulu. Lake Sentarum has an area of 117,500 hectares, which sometimes is almost dry in the dry season, and Lake Luar I, which has an area of approximately 5,400 hectares. Both of these lakes have potential as tourist attractions.

== Government and administrative divisions ==
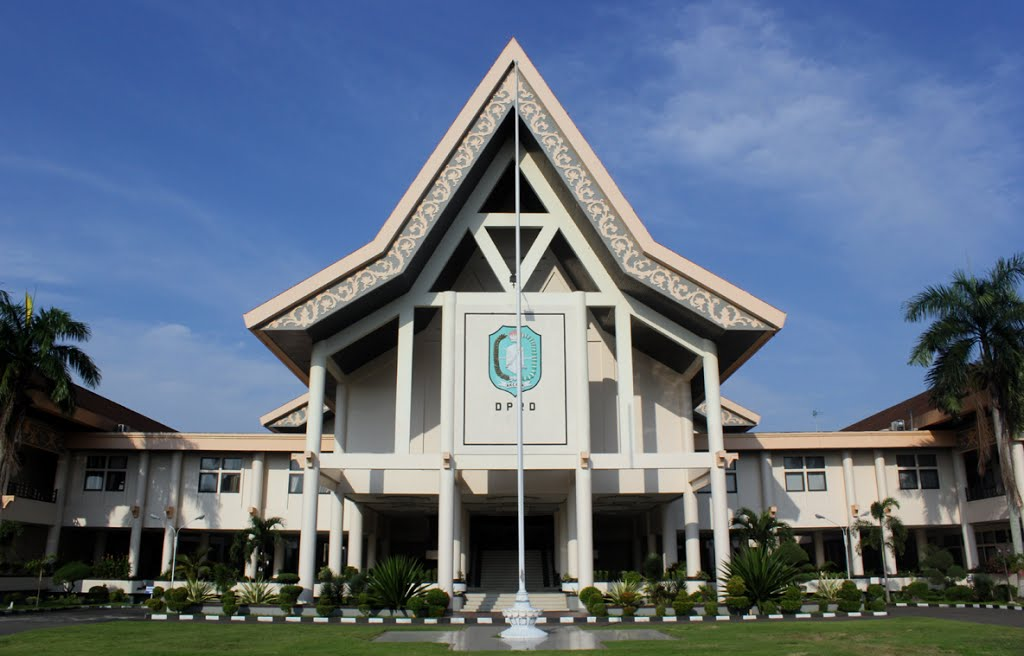
West Kalimantan's parliament building

Until 1999 the province was composed of six regencies (kabupaten) - Sambas, Pontianak, Ketapang, Kapuas Hulu, Sanggau and Sintang - and the independent City (kota) of Pontianak. A seventh regency, Bengkayang, was formed on 20 April 1999 from part of Sambas Regency, and an eighth, Landak, was formed on 4 October 1999 from part of Pontianak Regency. A second independent city, Singkawang, was formed on 21 June 2001 from part of Bengkayang Regency. On 18 December 2003 Sekadau Regency was cut out of Sanggau Regency, and Melawi Regency was cut out of Sintang Regency, while on 2 January 2007 North Kayong Regency was cut out of Ketapang Regency, and on 17 July 2007 Kubu Raya Regency was cut out of Pontianak Regency. In 2014 the residual part of Pontianak Regency was re-named as Mempawah. West Kalimantan is thus now subdivided into two cities and twelve regencies. About 29 per cent of the province's population lives in the Greater Pontianak area. The capitals, areas and populations at the 2010 and 2020 Censuses (as well as the official estimates as at mid 2025 of the regencies and cities are:

Kode Wilayah	Name of City or Regency	Capital	Area in km^{2}	Pop'n 2010 Census	Pop'n 2020 Census	Pop'n mid 2025 Estimate	HDI
61.01	Sambas Regency	Sambas	5,928.22	496,120	629,905	661,542	0.632 (Medium)
61.72	Singkawang City	Singkawang	550.35	186,462	235,064	253,812	0.698 (Medium)
61.07	Bengkayang Regency	Bengkayang	5,488.32	215,277	286,366	307,823	0.644 (Medium)
61.08	Landak Regency	Ngabang	8,430.71	329,649	397,610	424,472	0.635 (Medium)
61.02	Mempawah Regency	Mempawah	1,934.83	234,021^{(a)}	301,560	320,630	0.627 (Medium)
61.71	Pontianak City	Pontianak	118.21	554,764	658,685	686,019	0.766 (High)
61.12	Kubu Raya Regency	Sungai Raya	8,549.06	500,970	609,392	660,374	0.645 (Medium)
	Western group		30,999.69	2,517,263	3,118,590	3,314,672	
61.11	North Kayong Regency (Kayong Utara)	Sukadana	4,108.53	95,594	126,571	137,290	0.585 (Low)
61.04	Ketapang Regency	Ketapang	30,012.02	427,460	570,657	607,049	0.632 (Medium)
	Southern group (Kayong)		34,120.55	523,054	697,220	744,339	
61.06	Kapuas Hulu Regency	Putussibau	31,318.25	222,160	252,609	269,049	0.629 (Medium)
61.10	Melawi Regency	Nanga Pinoh	10,122.51	178,645	228,270	246,920	0.628 (Medium)
61.03	Sanggau Regency	Sanggau	12,452.22	408,468	484,836	516,710	0.620 (Medium)
61.09	Sekadau Regency	Sekadau	5,979.04	181,634	211,559	225,219	0.619 (Medium)
61.05	Sintang Regency	Sintang	22,025.79	364,759	421,306	449,211	0.631 (Medium)
	Eastern group (Kapuas Raya)		81,897.81	1,355,666	1,598,580	1,707,109	
	Totals	Pontianak	147,018.06	4,395,983	5,414,390	5,766,030	0.648 (Medium)

The province comprises two of Indonesia's 84 national electoral districts to elect members to the People's Representative Council. The West Kalimantan I Electoral District consists of the 5 regencies and 2 cities listed above as "Western group", plus the 2 regencies listed above as "Southern Group", and elects 8 members to the People's Representative Council. The West Kalimantan II Electoral District consists of the 5 regencies listed above as "Eastern group", and elects 4 members to the People's Representative Council.

=== Proposed new province of Kapuas Raya ===
On 25 October 2013, the Indonesian People's Representative Council (DPR) began reviewing draft laws on the establishment of 57 prospective regencies and 8 new provinces; one of the proposed new provinces is Kapuas Raya (Great Kapuas) in West Kalimantan. This proposed measure has been held in abeyance since 2013, but if and when the bill is approved, this will make Kapuas Raya the seventh largest province in Indonesia after Central Kalimantan, East Kalimantan, South Papua, Riau, South Sumatra and the newly-reduced Papua (province), as the total area of Kapuas Raya, encompassing five regencies, will measure 81,897.81 square km, or 55.7 per cent of the current size of West Kalimantan. Ever since 2005, the five regencies in the eastern part of West Kalimantan (Sanggau, Sekadau, Sintang, Melawi and Kapuas Hulu) have floated a concept to establish Kapuas Raya due to the distance issues from the respective regencies to the province capital Pontianak. The distance between the farthest regency of Kapuas Hulu and Mempawah is 661 km, followed by Melawi (439 km), Sintang (395 km), Sekadau (315 km) and Sanggau (267 km).

== Ecology ==
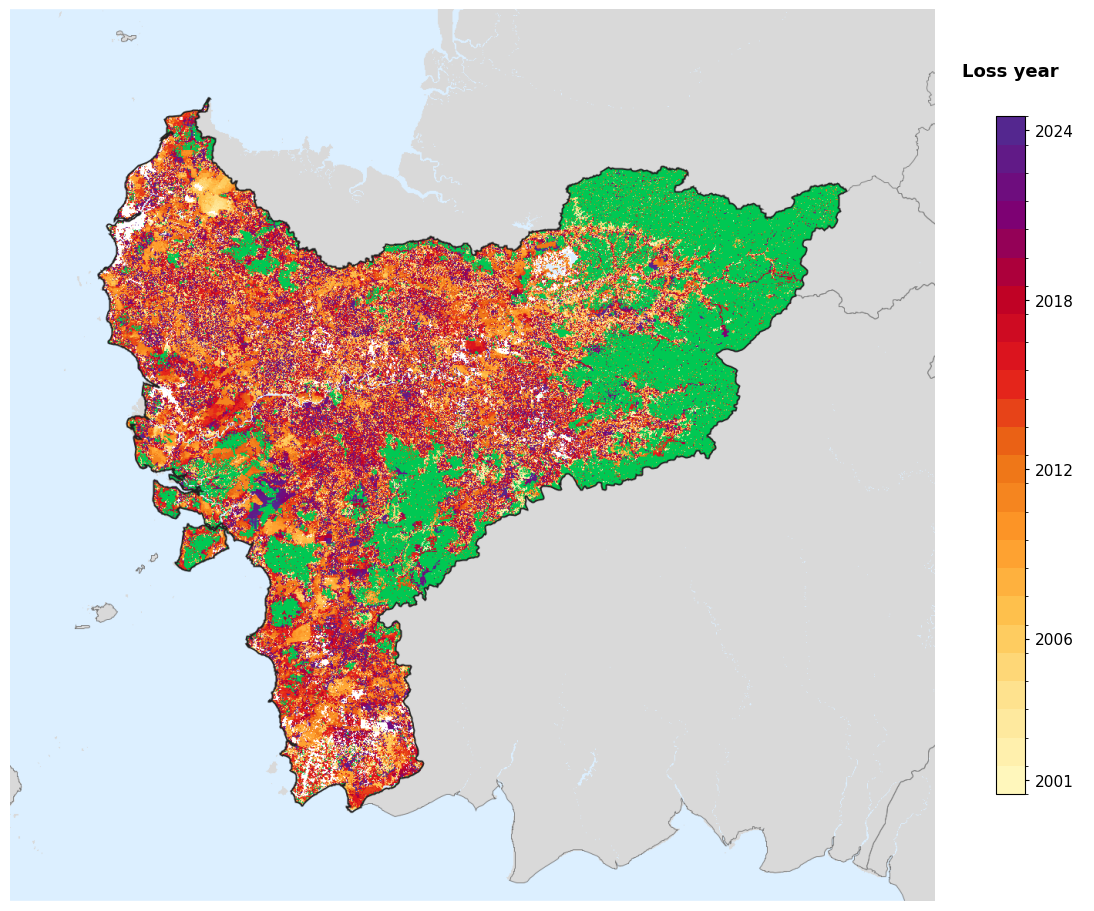
Tree-cover loss year in West Kalimantan, 2001-2024, from the Global Forest Change dataset.

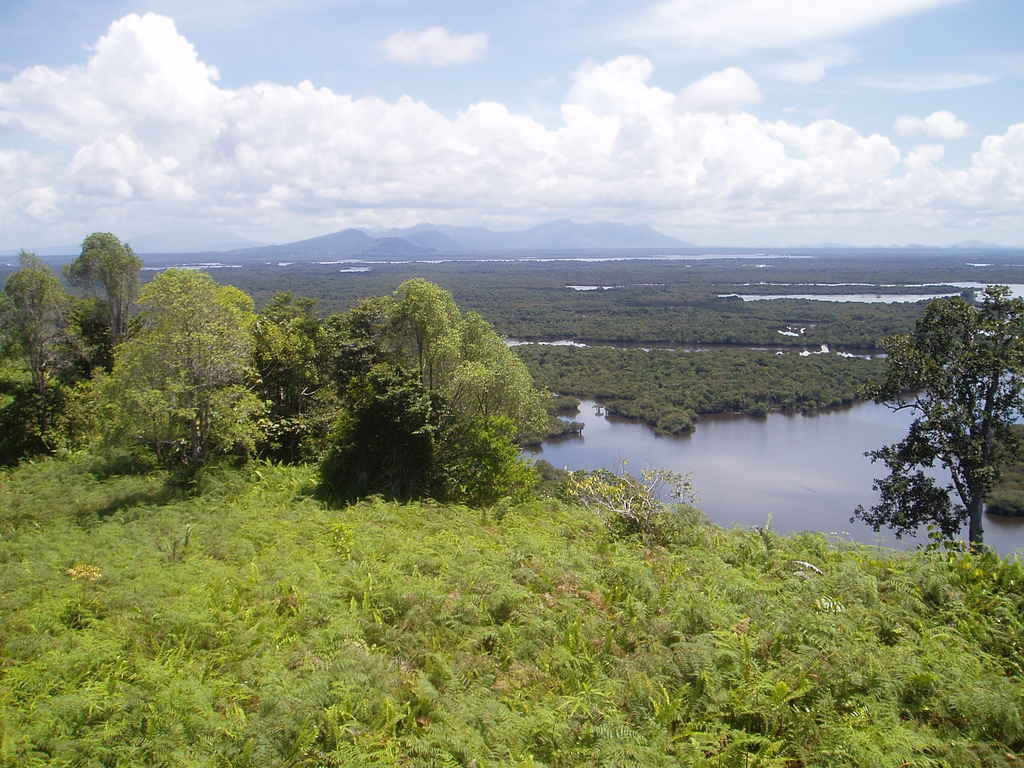
Danau Sentarum National Park is a wetland of international importance located in the north of the province

There are three National Parks in the province: Danau Sentarum, Gunung Palung and Betung Kerihun. Currently, illegal logging for trees such as dipterocarp and plantations of palm oil and pulpwood threaten many rare species in the province due to the effects of habitat destruction. Peat bog fires and droughts or flooding during ENSO episodes also threaten the area and are worsened by ongoing deforestation.

Dr Hotlin Ompusunggu has received the 2011 Whitley Award for her conservation work in West Kalimantan. She has been fighting against illegal logging by the trade-off with low-cost quality dental and medical treatment to 60,000 villagers on condition they involve in reforestation and conservation work.

== Education ==
- SMA Negeri 4 Pontianak public school
- MAN Kota Singkawang public school

== Demographics ==
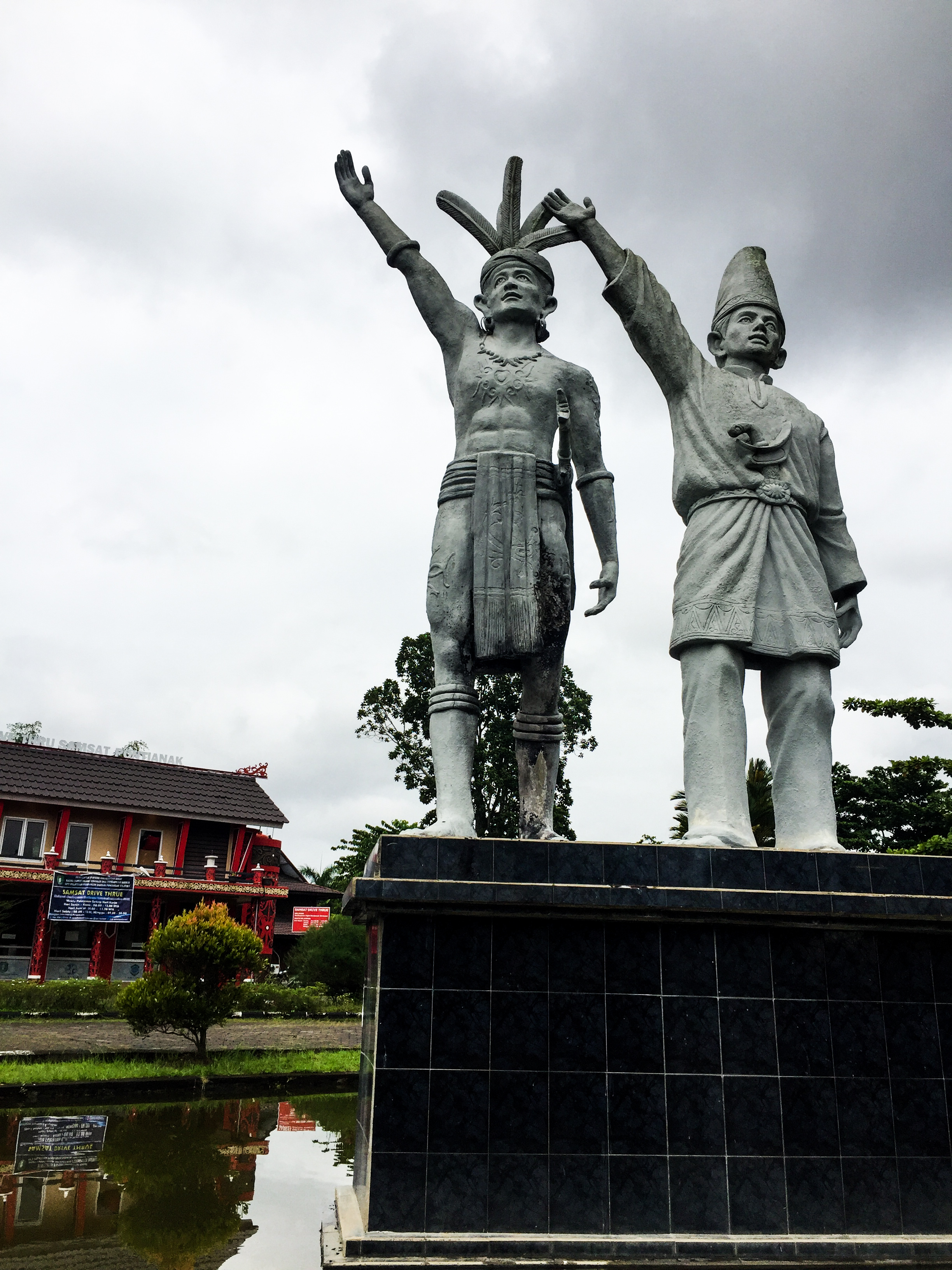
The "Dayak-Malay" brotherhood monument in West Kalimantan Provincial Museum, Pontianak. Forming 34.93% and 33.84% respectively, the Dayak and the Malays are the two largest native indigenous communities in the province.

=== Ethnic groups ===
Ethnicity in West Kalimantan (2010)
1. Dayak (34.9%)
2. Malays (33.8%)
3. Javanese (9.74%)
4. Chinese (8.17%)
5. Madurese (6.27%)
6. Buginese (3.13%)
7. Sundanese (1.13%)
8. Batak (0.60%)
9. Banjarese (0.33%)
10. Others (1.85%)

The largest ethnic groups in West Kalimantan are the Dayak (34.93%) and Malays (33.84%). The Dayaks are tribes in the hinterland, while the ethnic Malay mainly lives in the beach and river coastal areas. The third-largest ethnic group is the Javanese (9.74%), who live mainly in areas of transmigration. In fourth place are the ethnic Chinese (8.17%), who are largely found in urban areas such as Singkawang and Pontianak. Next in fifth place are the Madurese (6.27%), who live mainly in Pontianak and Kubu Raya.

The next largest ethnic groups (sixth to tenth) are the Bugis (3.13%), Sundanese (1.13%), Batak (0.60%), Daya (0.52%) and Banjar (0.33%), while others constitute 1.33%.

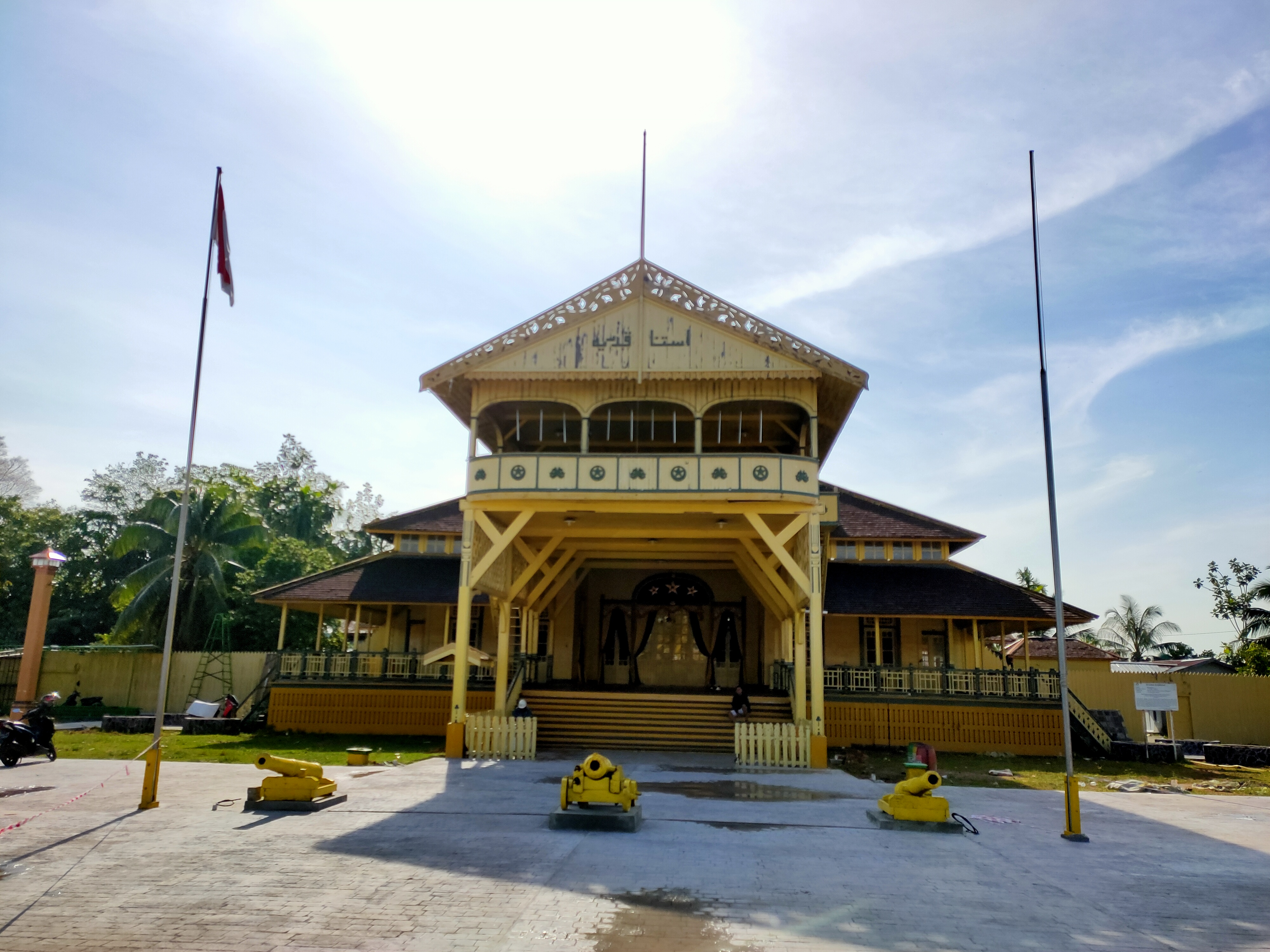
Kadariah Palace, the palace of the Sultanate of Pontianak

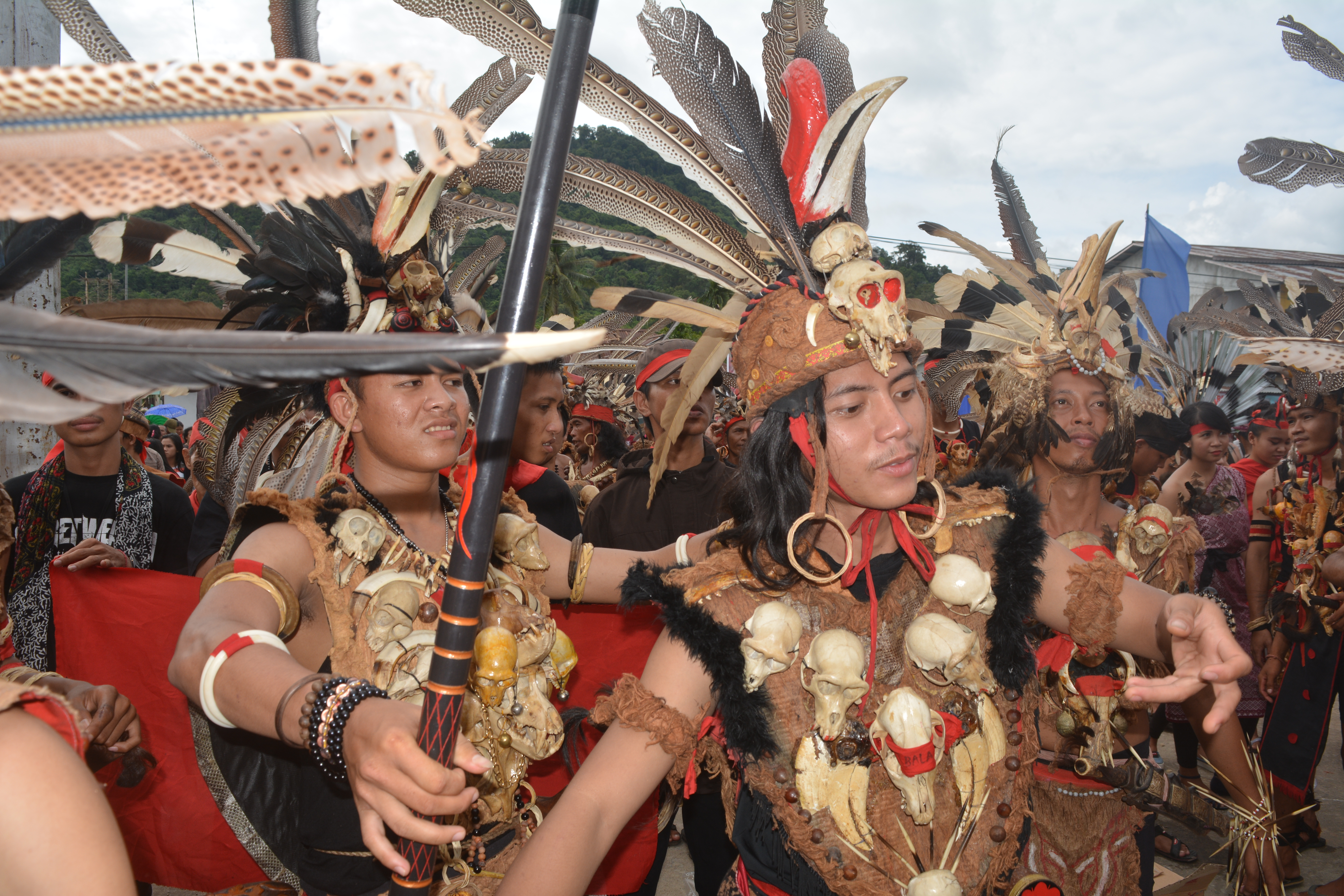
Dayak warrior parade in an event commemorating Youth Pledge Day at the Anjungan, West Kalimantan.

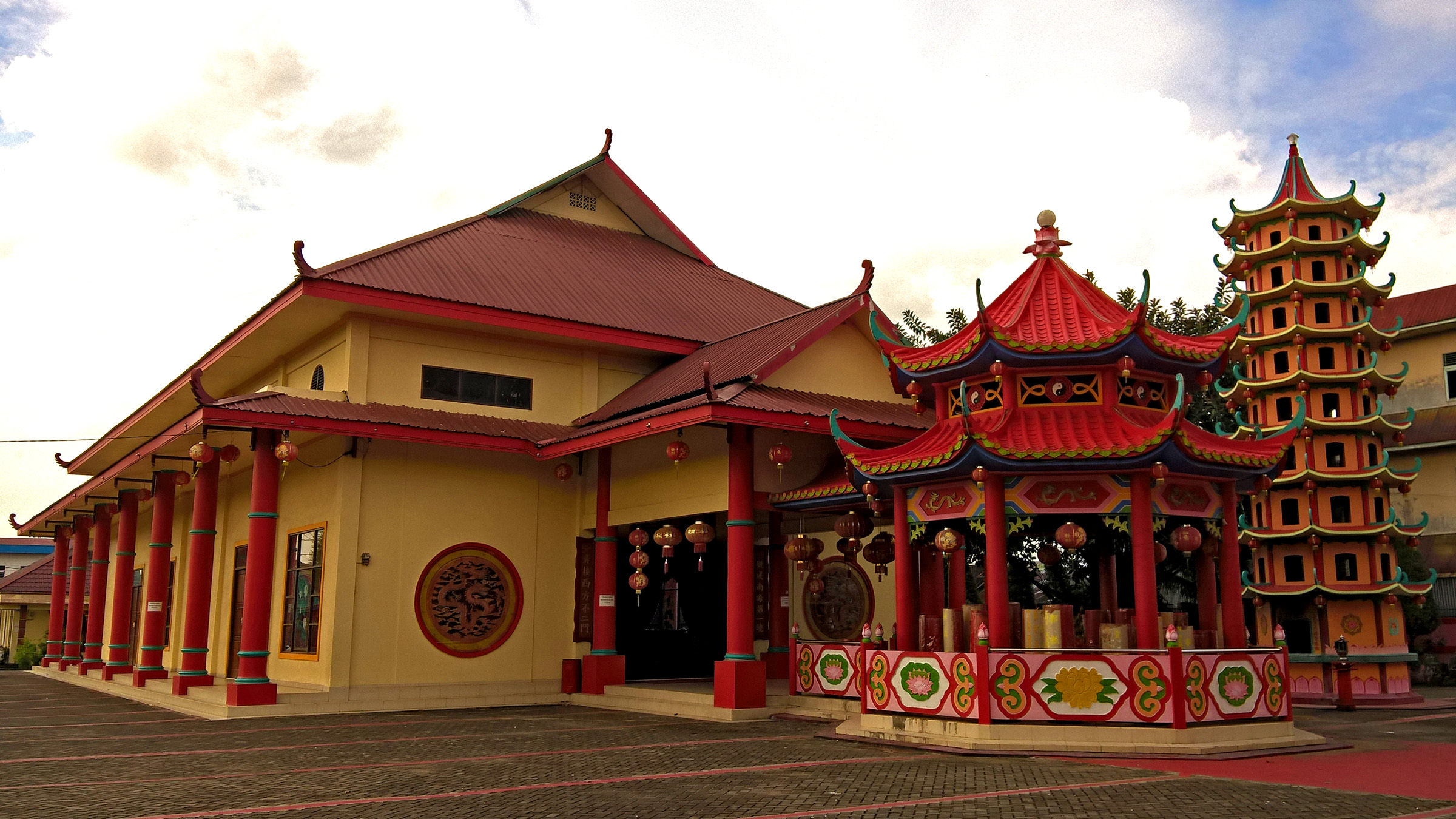
Kwan Im Buddhist temple in North Pontianak.

=== Languages ===
Indonesian is a language commonly used by people in West Kalimantan for interracial communication, but there are other indigenous Malayic languages including Pontianak Malay spoken in the capital Pontianak, and dialects of Sambas, Mempawah, Matam and Ketapang. The Sanggau, Sintang and Sekadau Malay dialects spoken in the northern part of the province itself are similar to Sarawak Malay in Sarawak; meanwhile, Pontianak Malay is more closely related to Malaysian and Riau Malay languages. There are also various types of Dayak languages; according to research by Institut Dayakologi, 188 dialects are spoken by the Dayaks; one language named Ot Danum is said to stand alone and is not a dialect of other Dayak groups. Dialect, however, lies in some sub-Uut Danum Dayak tribe itself. As the sub-tribe language Dohoi for example, to say eat only consist of a minimum of 16 vocabularies, ranging from the most delicate to the most rugged. For example, ngolasut (was fine), germ (general), dekak (for older or respected), ngonahuk (rough), monirak (the rough) and Macuh (for the spirits of the dead).

Chinese languages such as Teochew and Khek/Hakka are also spoken.

=== Religion ===
Religion in West Kalimantan (2022)
1. Islam (60.4%)
2. Roman Catholic (22.1%)
3. Protestantism (11.6%)
4. Buddhism (5.50%)
5. Confucianism (0.29%)
6. Hinduism (0.05%)
7. Others (0.02%)

According to the 2020 census, the largest religious group in West Kalimantan (60%) is Islam. Muslim majority areas in West Kalimantan are the inhabited coastal regions where the majority are Malays, such as Sambas, Mempawah, Ketapang, North Kayong, Kubu Raya, Kapuas Hulu and Pontianak. In Melawi and Singkawang approximately 50% of the population are Muslims.

Islam is also practiced by Javanese, Madurese and Bugis located in West Kalimantan. In rural areas inhabited by the Dayak predominantly Christian as in Bengkayang, Landak, Sanggau, Sintang and Sekadau. The Chinese in West Kalimantan mostly adhere to Buddhism and Christianity (Catholic / Protestant).

== Culture ==
=== Traditional Dance ===
Tari Monong / Manang is a traditional dance of West Kalimantan society. This dance is a healing dance. When there are people who are sick but do not heal, usually the family will hold Tari Monong / Manang. The dancer will act as a shaman healer who issued a special spell. Thus, the patient will be motivated to get better. Tari Zapin Tembung is a type of social dance in the communities of West Kalimantan. Tari Menoreh Getah is a traditional dance which describes the motion of life of rural communities in West Kalimantan that meet their daily needs. Based on the idea that dance is worked by elements of dance movement Malay and Dayak in West Kalimantan. Tari Mandau is a dance which symbolises of the fighting spirit of the Dayak community in defence of dignity and status.

=== Traditional Clothes ===
West Kalimantan men wear traditional clothing in the form of headgear decorated with feathers of hornbills, sleeveless shirt (vest), knee-length trousers and fabric that serves as a belt. Usually, West Kalimantan men also wear jewellery, such as a beaded necklace. Women usually wear cloth covering the chest, as well as layers of fabrics which serves as setagen and woven fabrics. Jewellery is worn in the form of hornbill feathers as a headdress, beaded necklace and bracelet on the arm. This custom clothing comes from the Dayak tribe.

The classical attire for the Malays in West Kalimantan includes Telok Belanga (for men) and Baju Kurong (for women). Wearing Baju Telok Belanga and Baju Kurong is especially popular during weddings and other traditional functions. Songket weaving is also popular, especially in Sambas (located in the northwestern part of the province).

=== Traditional Weapons ===
The mandau is a traditional weapon commonly used by people in West Kalimantan. A mandau is a kind of machete and some are used for everyday purposes. Other weapons are a shield, blowgun, spear, and sickle. The mandau is used for the purposes of war, decorated with human hair as a symbol of courage. The shield, which is called kelikit, has the size of a full-sized man with ornate carvings in black and red. Other weapons are blowpipe with arrows tipped with poison sap of a tree called ipoh.

=== Traditional Houses ===
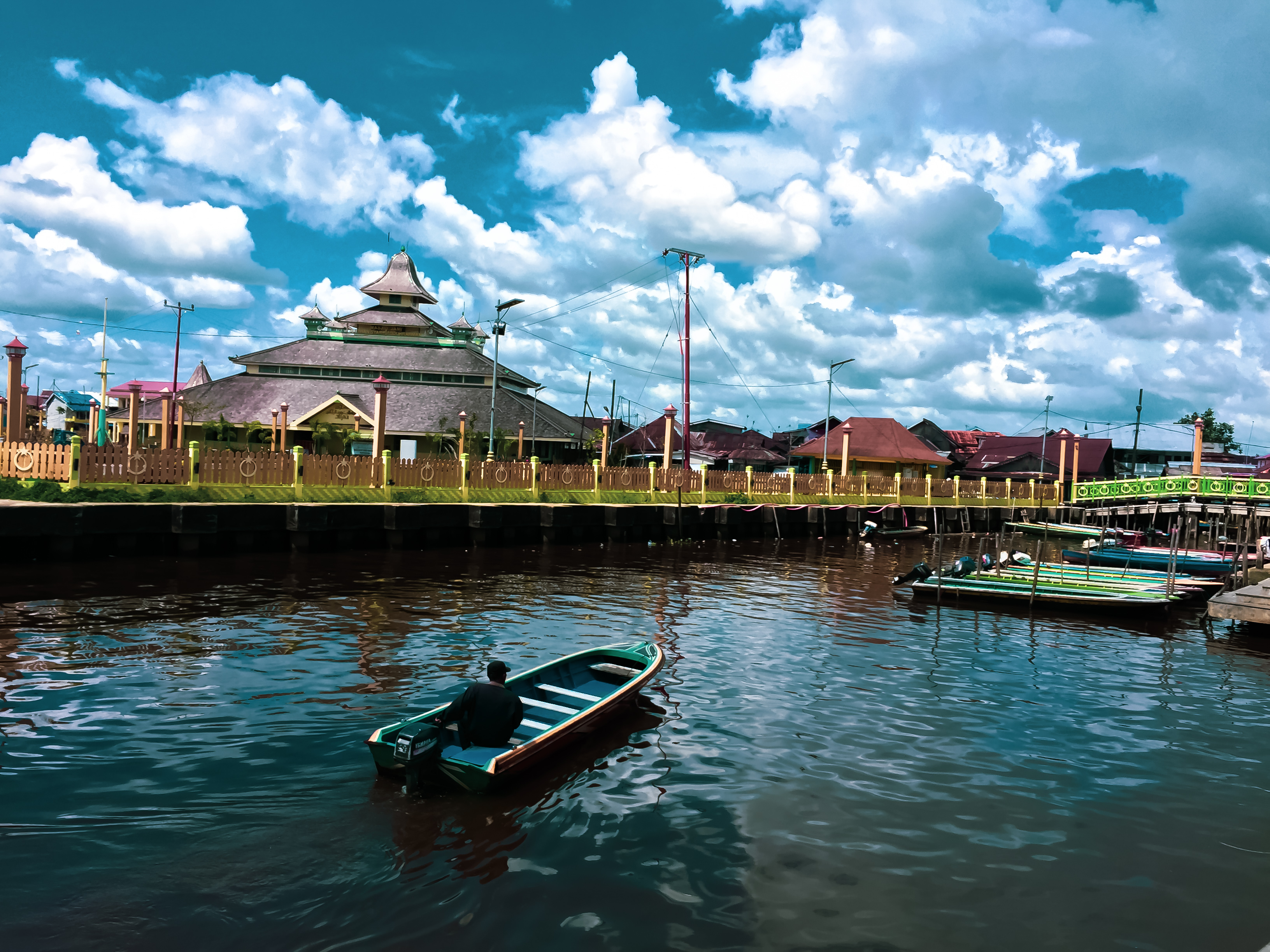
Masjid Jami' Pontianak, originally built in 1771 on the banks of Kapuas River. It was the first structure built to commemorate the foundation of Pontianak Sultanate (the area would later become the capital city of West Kalimantan Province). A prime example of the local Malay-Muslim architecture, the religious monument has also received influence by Middle Eastern, European and Javanese architecture.

One of the cultural houses in West Kalimantan is called "Rumah Panjang" (longhouse) because its size length and made of wood. This house is the residence of the Dayak tribe, the function of this custom home is actually a place to stay for a couple of heads of families and also usually used for meetings. They can also be found in other provinces of Kalimantan as well as the neighbouring Sarawak in Malaysia. "Rumah Radakng" which is also a kind of longhouse located in Pontianak and the surrounding area. This house has a length of approximately 380 meters high and 7 meters including the most luxurious custom home in West Kalimantan in the meantime. "Rumah Batok" is a traditional house owned by the Dayak tribe Badayuh, this house has a unique shape because it has a round shape and height of up to approximately 12 meters to the top. Malay traditional house is a house owned by ethnic Malays, which is located in the city of Pontianak. These traditional houses are usually used as a place of deliberation, performing arts, wedding place citizens and other events.

=== Festivals ===
Robo-robo tradition. Robo-robo derived from the Robo or Rabu (Wednesday). Robo-Robo tradition held on the last Wednesday of Safar based on the Islamic Calendar, which symbolizes a blessing. According to the story, this rite is a warning or trail the arrival of Rajkumar Mas Surya Negara of the Kingdom Matan (Martapura) to the Kingdom of Mempawah (Pontianak). The ritual begins when the Maharaja (King), Queen Mempawah, sons and daughters and the retainer and the guard departed from Castle Village, Mempawah use bidar boat, the boat kingdom of Amantubillah Palace. The ship will sail to the mouth of the River Mempawah located in the village of Kuala Mempawah with the distance of about one hour. At the river, the mouth will do some sort of ceremony "welcome" to the sea as when Opu Daeng Menambon arrived at the river mouth for the first time. Robo-robo itself was intended as a warning Haulan series of important events began on Monday night to Tuesday, the last month of Safar to commemorate the death of Opu Daeng Manambun. For the citizens of Bugis descent in the ordinance, robo-robo usually celebrated with family meals at home. Not only at home, but eating together also carried students in various schools both elementary to high school on Wednesday morning.
