= Muara Pawan =

- District
- Location within West Kalimantan

- Location in Kalimantan and Indonesia Muara Pawan (Indonesia)
- Coordinates: 1°51′S 109°59′E
- Province: West Kalimantan

Area
  - Total: 349.0 km^{2} (134.7 sq mi)

Population (mid 2024 estimate)
  - Total: 47,729
  - Density: 136.8/km^{2} (354.2/sq mi)
- Time zone: UTC+7 (WIB)

Muara Pawan is an administrative district (kecamatan) of Ketapang Regency (Kabupaten Ketapang), one of the regencies of West Kalimantan province on the island of Borneo in Indonesia. It is located on the coast north of the town of Ketapang, at the mouth of the Pawan River.

== Administration ==
Muara Pawan District is sub-divided into eight rural villages (desa), all listed below with their areas and populations as of mid 2024, all sharing the postcode of 78810.

Kode Wilayah	Name of kelurahan or desa	Area in km^{2}	Population mid 2024 estimate
61.04.17.2001	Sungai Awan Kanan	56.85	4,504
61.04.17.2002	Sungai Awan Kiri	59.60	4,671
61.04.17.2003	Tempurukan	116.36	2,755
61.04.17.2005	Tanjung Pura	74.29	1,007
61.04.17.2004	Ulak Medang	55.10	772
61.04.17.2006	Mayak	77.20	1,075
61.04.17.2007	Tanjung Pasar	36.85	1,305
61.04.17.2008	Suka Maju	51.02	2,542
61.04.17	Totals	527.27	18,631

== Main sights ==
- Gunung Palung National Park, a rainforest park that can be reached from Ketapang town. It was once wholly part of Ketapang Regency, but now only a small part is, the rest in the regency that is named Kayong Utara or North Kayong (created 2007). Kayong is the nickname of Ketapang.

== See also ==
- Teochew dialect, a common dialect of Chinese residents in Ketapang Regency.
- Roman Catholic Diocese of Ketapang
