= Benua Kayong =

- District
- Location within West Kalimantan

- Location in Kalimantan and Indonesia Benua Kayong (Indonesia)
- Coordinates: 1°51′S 109°59′E
- Province: West Kalimantan

Area
  - Total: 349.0 km^{2} (134.7 sq mi)

Population (mid 2025 estimate)
  - Total: 48,171
  - Density: 138.0/km^{2} (357.5/sq mi)
- Time zone: UTC+7 (WIB)

Benua Kayong is an administrative district (kecamatan) of Ketapang Regency (Kabupaten Ketapang), one of the regencies of West Kalimantan province on the island of Borneo in Indonesia.

== Administration ==
Benua Kayong District is sub-divided into four urban communities (kelurahan, identified by asterisks * in the table below) and seven rural villages (desa), all listed below with their areas and populations as of mid 2025, together with their postcodes. Apart from the large (but mainly unpopulated) inland desa of Negeri Baru, all the other villages form part of the Ketapang urban area, on the south side of the Pawan River from the town itself.

Kode Wilayah	Name of kelurahan or desa	Area in km^{2}	Population mid 2025 estimate	Post code
61.04.18.1001	Kauman *	3.70	6,109	78821
61.04.18.1002	Mulia Kerta *	22.90	9,285	78822
61.04.18.2003	Padang	7.00	4,141	78822
61.04.18.1004	Tuan Tuan *	22.55	5,930	78822
61.04.18.2005	Sungai Kinjil	11.87	2,950	78822
61.04.18.2006	Suka Baru	17.50	3,062	78822
61.04.18.2007	Baru	12.80	4,833	78822
61.04.18.2008	Negeri Baru	228.60	3,447	78822
61.04.18.1009	Banjar *	0.52	1,309	78822
61.04.18.2010	Mekar Sari	13.65	3,932	78822
61.04.18.2011	Kinjil Pesisir	7.91	3,173	78822
61.04.18	Totals	349.00	48,171	

== Main sights ==
- Gunung Palung National Park, a rainforest park that can be reached from Ketapang town. It was once wholly part of Ketapang Regency, but now only a small part is, the rest in the regency that is named Kayong Utara or North Kayong (created 2007). Kayong is the nickname of Ketapang.

== See also ==
- Teochew dialect, a common dialect of Chinese residents in Ketapang Regency.
- Roman Catholic Diocese of Ketapang
