= The Power of Mama =

- Abbreviation: TPOM
- Formation: June 8, 2022
- Founded: 2022
- Founder: Siti Nur Aini (Mak Anjang Siti); Maimun
- Type: Women's volunteer group
- Region served: Ketapang Regency, West Kalimantan, Indonesia
- Members: 146 (2026)
- Award: Clean Air Championship Award 2023

The Power of Mama (TPOM) is a women's volunteer group based in Ketapang Regency, West Kalimantan, Indonesia, that works to prevent and respond to peatland and wildfires. Its members patrol fire-prone areas, monitor and report fire hotspots, help extinguish fires, and educate locals about fire prevention.

== History ==
The Power of Mama was established on 8 June 2022 in partnership with the Yayasan Inisiasi Alam Rehabilitasi Indonesia, or YIARI, an environment non-governmental organization. YIARI brought together women (Mama) from villages in Ketapang and provided training in fire prevention and firefighting.

Local Mamas associated with the initiative include Siti Nur Aini, known as Mak Anjang Siti, from Pematang Gadung Village, and Maimun from Suka Maju Village. The community developed around the participation of women in environmental protection and efforts to increase awareness of forest and land fires in rural communities.

The community operates in a region affected by seasonal forest fires, including fires on peatland. Smoke from the fires has also caused respiratory problems among local residents, contributing to the volunteers' interest in protecting their families and communities.

== Activities ==
=== Fire patrols and response ===
TPOM patrol fire-prone areas on motorcycles and on foot. They record the coordinates of hotspots, take photographs, and enter monitoring information into an application. They also help extinguish fires when possible. Their work focuses on early detection and responding to fires before they spread. Training provided to members has included firefighting, drone operation, and the use of SMART Patrol (a spatial monitoring and reporting tool) to monitor areas vulnerable to fire.

=== Community outreach ===
The group also seeks to reduce the use of uncontrolled burning for land clearing. Members speak with farmers and other residents about the risks of slash-and-burn practices, including the danger that fires may spread beyond the intended area. They explain the effects of smoke on families and encourage residents to take precautions when clearing agricultural land. Members have also received training in public speaking, enabling members to communicate fire-prevention messages to residents in their villages.

== Membership ==
As of September 2026, the community comprised 146 women aged between 20 and 58 from villages in Ketapang. Members include farmers and homemakers who perform their duties as volunteers without salaries.

== Award ==
In November 2023, The Power of Mama received the Clean Air Championship Award 2023 for the Kalimantan region. The award was presented by the Faculty of Forestry and Environment at IPB University and Farmers' Initiatives for Ecological Livelihood and Democracy (FIELD) Indonesia.
