= Sultanate of Sarawak =

Minor Malay kingdom

Sultanate of Sarawak كسلطانن ملايو سراوق دارالهنا (Jawi) Kesultanan Sarawak Darul Hana (Malay)
- 1599–1641
- Flag

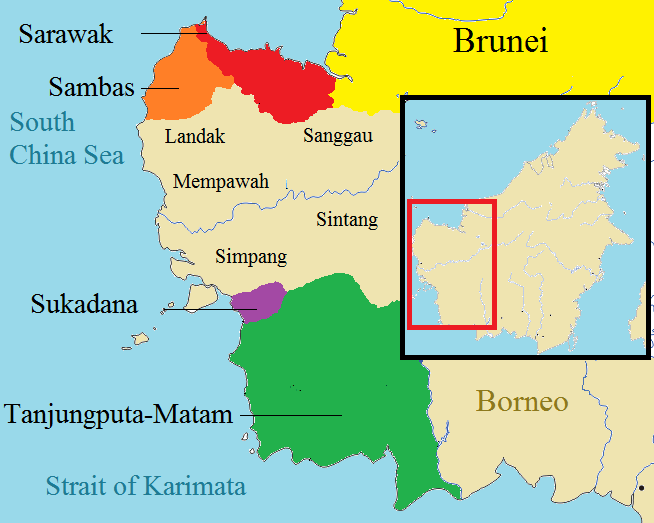
- The polity of western Borneo, 17th century, with Sarawak in Red. The kingdoms that established close relationship with Sarawak are illustrated in colour, while other neighbouring kingdoms are represented in light brown.
- Capital: Santubong
- Common languages: Classical Malay
- Religion: Islam, local animism
- Government: Monarchy
- Sultan
  - 1599–1641: Sultan Ibrahim Ali Omar Shah
- History
  - The foundation of Sarawak: 1599
  - Assassination of Sultan Tengah: 1641
Preceded by	Succeeded by
Bruneian Empire	Bruneian Empire
- Today part of: Malaysia; Indonesia

The Sultanate of Sarawak (Malay: كسلطانن ملايو سراوق دارالهنا, romanized: Kesultanan Sarawak) was a Malay kingdom, located in present-day Kuching Division, Sarawak. The kingdom was founded in 1599, after the conquest of the preceding Santubong Kingdom and the later Sultanate of Brunei.

The kingdom saw the reign of a sole sultan, Sultan Tengah, Prince of Brunei, known as Ibrahim Ali Omar Shah Ibni Sultan Muhammad Hassan of Sarawak. The state established a close relationship with Brunei and Johor. It forged dynastic rules with the surrounding Malay kingdoms in western Borneo including the sultanates of Sambas, Sukadana and Tanjungpura-Matan.

The sultanate was dissolved following Sultan Tengah's assassination in 1641, after 42 years of rule. The administration of the territory was then replaced by the local Malay governors appointed from Brunei, reunifying the area into the Bruneian empire.

The historical significance of the Sarawak Sultanate, alongside neighboring Malay kingdoms such as Santubong (near Kuching), Sadong (near Samarahan), Saribas, Kalaka (both in Betong Division), Lingga and Banting (both in Sri Aman) collectively shaped the pre-Brooke Sarawakian history.

== Etymology ==
Sultan Tengah named his Sultanate as Sarawak Darul Hana meaning "place of peace and tranquility".

== History ==
=== Founding ===
According to the Salahsilah Raja-Raja Brunei (Bruneian Royal Annals), the state was established following the demise of Sultan Muhammad Hasan of Brunei who ruled between 1582 and 1598. The death of the Sultan saw the enthronement of Abdul Jalilul Akbar, the eldest prince of Muhammad Hasan as the Sultan of Brunei. However, the crowning of Abdul Jalil Akbar was objected by Pengiran Muda Tengah, claiming that the status of Abdul Jalilul was invalid as the elder prince was born before their father become the sultan, in contrast to the Pengiran who was born after his father's ascension to the throne, hence he believed that he had the superior right to inherit the kingdom.

Already anticipating this dispute, the newly crowned Sultan of Brunei appointed the Pengiran Muda Tengah as the Sultan of Sarawak, a frontier territory far from the administrative centre of the Bruneian empire.

Sultan Tengah was accompanied by more than 1,000 soldiers from the Sakai, Kedayan, and Bunut tribes, all of whom are natives of Borneo, to Sarawak. A coterie of Bruneian nobility also followed him there. Sultan Tengah constructed a fortified palace in Sungai Bedil, Santubong in 1599, turning the area into the royal, judicial and administrate capital of the kingdom. He began to appoint his deputies and delegates, incorporating the position of Datu Seri Setia, Datu Shahbandar Indera Wangsa, Datu Amar Setia Diraja and Datuk Temenggong Laila Wangsa into the governance system. He was proclaimed sultan after completing the administration system of the new kingdom, bearing the regnal name Sultan Ibrahim Ali Omar Shah. According to the Sambas Royal records, Sultan Tengah Manga was known as Sultan Abdul Jalil.

=== Sarawak–Johore relation ===
Not long after the establishment of the sultanate of Sarawak, Sultan Tengah was on a trip to Pahang, (then an autonomous-kingdom in Johor) to visit his aunt, the Raja Bonda (Queen Creek of Pahang). Before he left, he elected four Datuks (nobleman) to administer his kingdom. His aunt was married to the sultan, Abdul Ghafur Muhiuddin Shah. While in Johor, he was invited to perform in a courtly dance. During the performance one of the dancers almost hit the face of Sultan Tengah with a handkerchief by accident. The furious Sultan Tengah then slapped the dancer. The Sultan of Pahang was disappointed and ordered the Sarawakian royal entourage to immediately leave his kingdom. Based on the narration of the Sultanate of Sambas, Sultan Tengah was ordered to leave Johor because of his refusal to marry Princess Cik Zohra upon the request of his aunt, The Queen Consort of Pahang.

=== Sarawak–Sukadana union ===
The royal entourage was hit by a major storm during their return voyage from Johore to Borneo. The vessel was blow off course and arrived on the shores of the Sukadana Kingdom. The polity of Sukadana was ruled by a Javanese Hindu king, Penambahan Giri Mustika, he was later known as Sultan Muhammad Saifuddin after his conversion to Islam by Sheikh Shamsuddin, a missionary from Mecca. It was also during his time in Sukadana that Sultan Tengah began his religious studies under the guidance of Sheikh Shamsuddin.

The Sultan later married to Ratu Surya Kesuma, sister of the reigning monarch. He also briefly settled in Sukadana and requested permission to carry out missionary activities on the local populace. His request was granted and he was given land around the Sambas River to perform his duties.

=== Sarawak–Sambas union ===
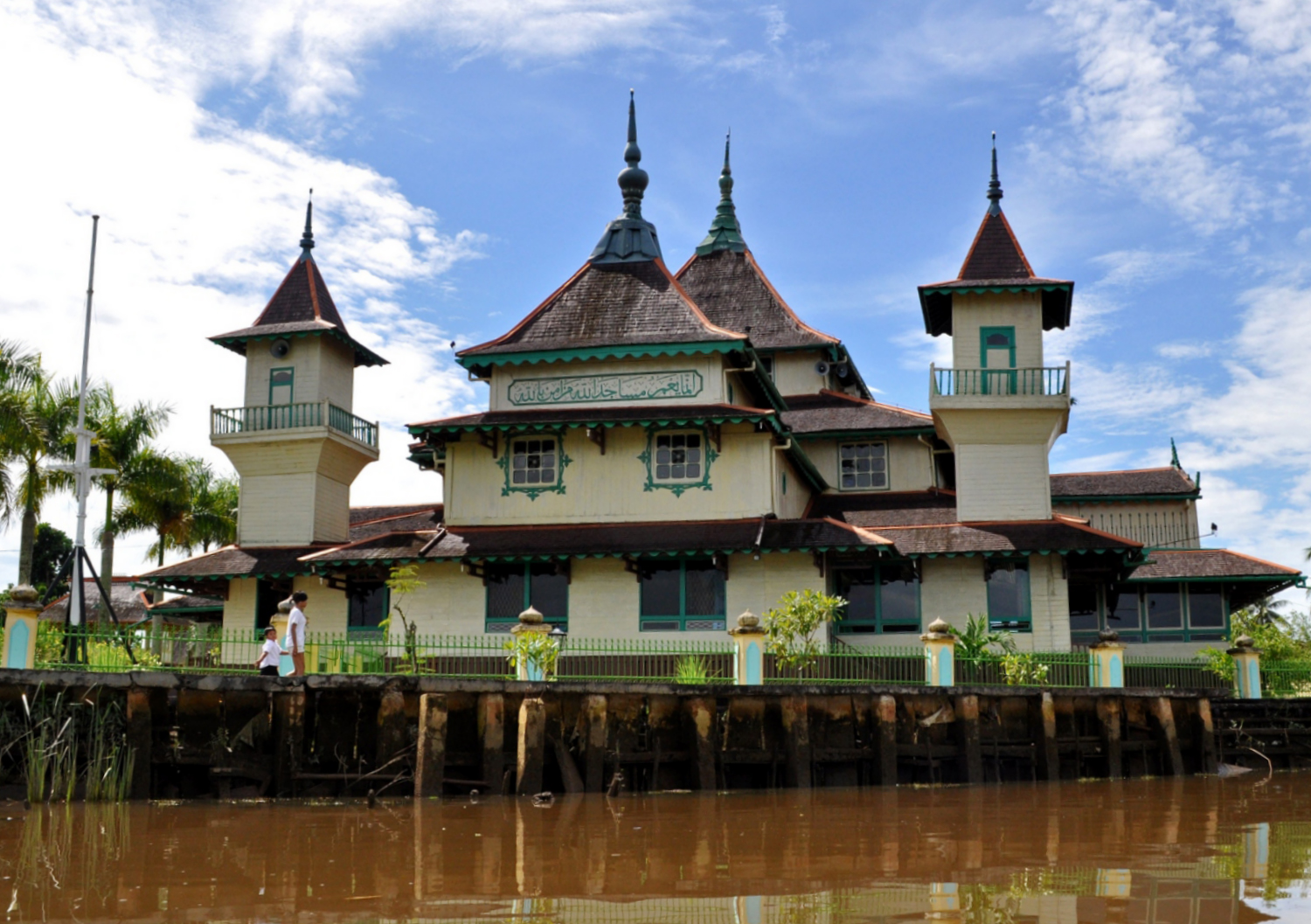
The jama masjid (congregational mosque) of Sambas Sultanate. The arrival of Sultan Tengah in Sambas converted the ancient Hindu kingdom into a Malay Muslim Sultanate. The current ruling house of Sambas traced their lineage from the Sarawakian Sultan.

By 1600, Sultan Tengah departed Sukadana to Sambas together with an entourage of 40 vessels consisting of armed men. The royal entourage arrived and built a settlement around Kuala Bangun, near the Sambas river. It was during this time in Sambas that Ratu Surya Kesuma gave birth to a son, Radin Sulaiman. She later gave birth to: Pengiran Badaruddin (would later become Pengiran Bendahara Seri Maharaja) and Pengiran Abdul Wahab (Pengiran Temenggong Jaya Kesuma).

Located further up of the Sambas River, The Sultan's arrival in Kota Lama was greatly celebrated by the Ratu Sapundak, the King of Kota Lama who welcomed the Sultan as the royal guest of honour. The King allowed Sultan Tengah to perform his missionary activities with the local populace, despite himself being a Hindu ruler of Majapahit descent. The long stay in Sambas also saw the marriage of Sultan Tengah's prince, Radin Sulaiman to Puteri Mas Ayu Bongsu, the princess of Ratu Sapundak. The royal pair had a son named Radin Bima, who would later become the second Sultan of Sambas.

Following the death of Ratu Sapundak, the throne of Sambas was succeeded by Pengiran Prabu Kenchana who appointed Radin Sulaiman as one of his advisers. Historical records noted that Ratu Sapundak had desired to appoint Sultan Tengah as his successor due to his expertise in governance and administration, although his request was highly objected by the members of the Sambas aristocracy due to their religious differences, with the members of the Sambas nobility being predominantly Hindu. However, this would change in 1631, when Radin Sulaiman rose to the crown of Sambas, with the regnal name of Sri Paduka al-Sultan Tuanku Muhammad Safiuddin I, the first Muslim ruler of the Sambas Kingdom.

=== Sarawak–Matan union ===
By 1630, the Sultan had departed to Matan. There, he married a local princess that gave birth to a son, Pengiran Mangku Negara, who later became the Sultan of Matan. A few years later, he decided to return to Sarawak.

== Reunion with the Bruneian empire ==
After staying a few years in Matan, the Sultan decided to return to Sarawak. In 1641, he and his party arrived in Batu Buaya, Santubong, while en route to Sarawak. It was during his time in Batu Buaya that he was assassinated by one of his followers (a follower is known as Sakei in historical text). The Sakei was described as "mad" and had stabbed Sultan Tengah with a spear into the chest. In retaliation, Sultan Tengah took the keris from a small boy and beheaded both Sakei and the boy. Datu Patinggi and Datu Temenggong then brought Sultan Tengah to the palace, where Sultan Tengah died upon arrival.

When the news of the death of the Sultan arrived in Sarawak, Datu Patinggi, Datu Shahbandar, Datu Amar and Datu Temenggong departed to Santubong to complete the funeral rites of the Sultan based on Bruneian royal customs. The queen consort, Ratu Surya Kesuma returned to the Kingdom of Sukananda after his death.

According to official history, no new sultan was appointed after the death of Sultan Tengah. Instead, Sarawak was governed under the Sultan of Brunei, with the help of four semi-autonomous Datus. Very little information exists on the rule of Sarawak during the 200 years from 1641 to 1826. In 1826, Sultan Omar Ali of Brunei decided to establish direct rule on Sarawak (Kuching region) by sending his nephew Pengiran Indera Mahkota there after the discovery of antimony ore in the area.

== Legacy ==
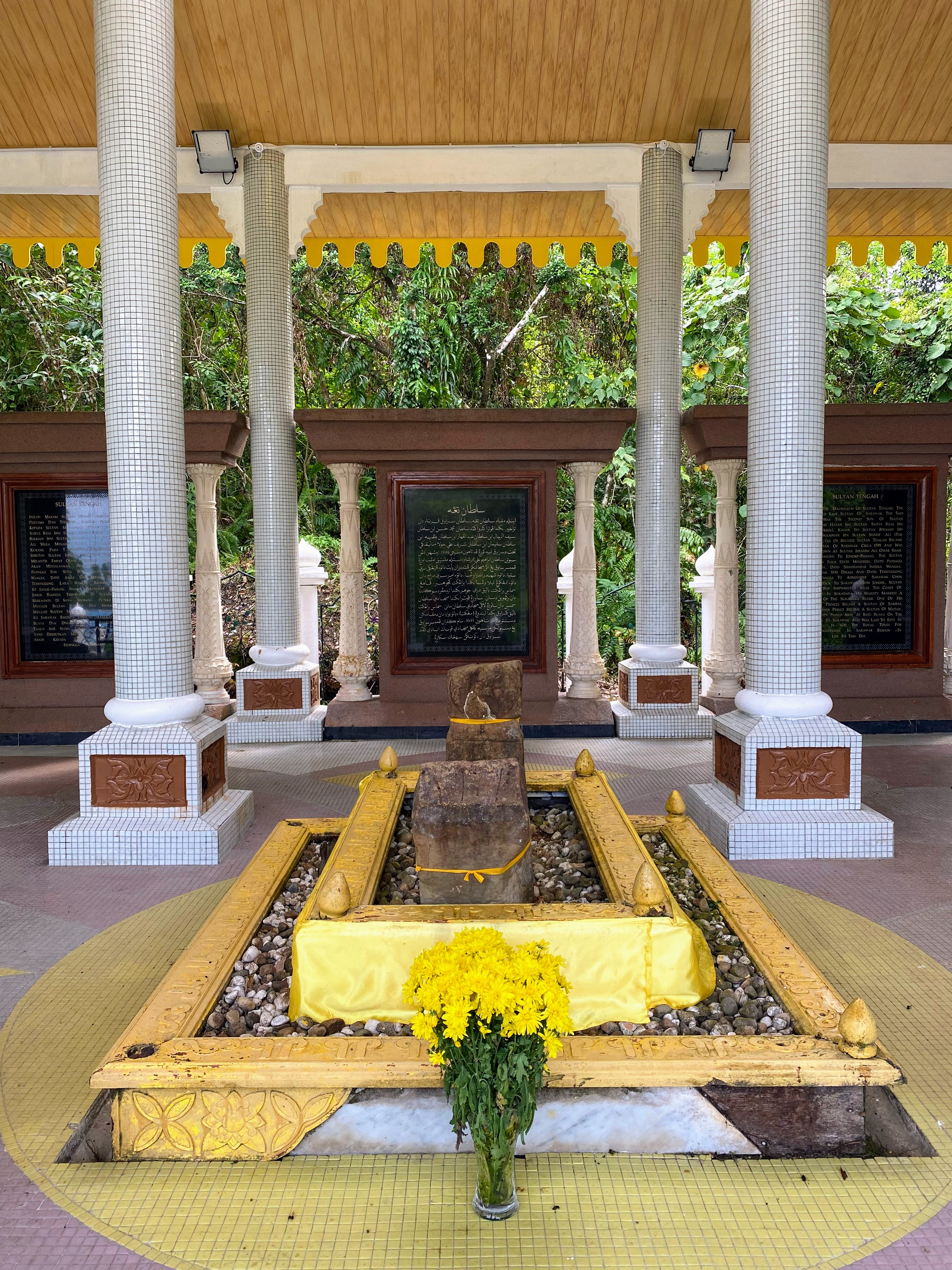
Mausoleum of Sultan Ibrahim Ali Omar Shah (Sultan Tengah) in Santubong, Sarawak.

The final resting place of the Sultan was discovered in 1993, in Kampong Batu Buaya. A royal mausoleum was constructed in May 1995 following the rediscovery of the tomb. The monument was visited by Hassanal Bolkiah, the Sultan of Brunei during his state visit to Sarawak in 2007.

Sultan Tengah reign has changed the sociopolitical framework of the western coast of Borneo. His capital at Sungai Bedil later became Kuching during the Raj of Sarawak. He also had incorporated the position of Datu Patinggi, Shahbandar Datu, Datu Amar and Datu Temenggong into the Sarawak administration system as can be seen today. While his missionary activities transformed the native Hindu society into a Malay Muslim community in coastal Borneo, his political marriage and alliances established new dynastic houses to the kingdoms of Sambas and Matan.

Today, some Kuching and the Sambas Malay community can trace their origin from those that followed Sultan Tengah to Sarawak.

Darul Hana Mosque, was completed in 2016, as part of the Darul Hana township project located in Petra Jaya, Sarawak. In 2017, a bridge named "Darul Hana" was built across the Sarawak River, connecting The Astana to the Kuching waterfront. In 2018, Sultan Tengah musical charity was staged in Stadium Perpaduan (Unity stadium) in Petra Jaya which attracted 5,000 visitors. In 2020, Sarawak Malaysian Islamic Party (PAS) attempted to use Darul Hana to describe the state of Sarawak as part of the heritage for Sarawak Malays, arguing that the legacy of Sultan Tengah is continued through the Malay chiefs appointed by the Brooke government and later Crown Colony of Sarawak. The term "Sarawak Darul Hana" was also used in a book published by Sarawak Printing Company in 1932. Chief minister of Sarawak, Abang Johari Openg later clarified that the state government had no intention to change the name from Sarawak Bumi Kenyalang (Sarawak Land of the Hornbills) to Sarawak Darul Hana.

== Bibliography ==
- Arkib Negara Malaysia (2016), Penemuan Makan Sultan Sarawak Pertama, Pekhabar
- Bruneidesi (2017), Sultans of Brunei
- Danielle Sendou Ringgit (2016), A brush with royalty in Sambas, The Borneo Post, archived from the original on 7 November 2017
- Gregory, Zayn (2015), The Maqam of Sultan Tengah, BinGreogory
- Kaffah (2017), Istana Alwatzikhubillah, Kabupaten Sambas, Kalimantan barat
- Larsen, Ib (2012), The First Sultan of Sarawak and His Links to Brunei and the Sambas Dynasty, 1599-1826: A Little known Pre-Brooke History, Malaysian Branch of Royal Asiatic Society
- Porritt, Vernon L. (2012), Sarawak Proper: trading and trading patterns from earlier times to the registration of the Borneo Company in 1856., Borneo Research Council, Inc
- Sarawak State Secretary Office (2016), Sarawak Before 1841, Official Website of Sarawak State Government
- Sygic (2017), Tomb of Sultan Tengah
- Tomi (2014), Pasak Negeri Kapuas 1616-1822, Feliz Books, ISBN 978-602-961-357-5
- Tunku Hilda (2015), Kino Santubung Megalithic Mystery, KINO (Kuching In and Out)
