= Batu Ampar, Kalimantan =

Batu Ampar is an administrative district (kecamatan) of Kubu Raya Regency (Kabupaten Kubu Raya), one of the regencies of West Kalimantan province on the island of Borneo in Indonesia. It lies to the south of the major city of Pontianak, and borders the North Kayong Regency to its south.

== Administration ==
Batu Ampar District is sub-divided into fifteen nominally rural villages (desa) all listed below with their areas and populations as at mid 2024, and all sharing the postcode of 78385. The western part of the district (to the west of the town of Batu Ampar) is entirely insular, consisting of the major part of Padang Tikar Island (Pulau Padangtikar), while the eastern part contains both insular and mainland areas.

Kode Wilayah	Name of kelurahan or desa	Area in km^{2}	Population mid 2024 estimate
61.12.05.2011	Tanjung Harapan	307.73	1,540
61.12.05.2010	Ambarawa	52.58	1,068
61.12.05.2008	Sungai Jawi	43.23	1,083
61.12.05.2007	Sungai Besar	40.89	1,187
61.12.05.2006	Tasik Malaya	35.43	1,395
61.12.05.2004	Padang Tikar Batu	15.16	4,373
61.12.05.2005	Padang Tikar Dua	7.46	4,658
61.12.05.2015	Medan Mas (a)	34.16	1,091
61.12.05.2009	Nipah Panjang	102.15	2,737
61.12.05.2003	Teluk Nibung	60.72	3,777
61.12.05	Western sector	699.51	22,909
61.12.05.2002	Batu Ampar	684.04	9,408
61.12.05.2012	Sungai Kerawang	109.21	1,551
61.12.05.2013	Sumber Agung	33.33	1,304
61.12.05.2014	Muara Tiga	174.32	1,682
61.12.05.2001	Tanjung Beringin (b)	730.40	550
61.12.05	Eastern sector	1,731.30	14,495
61.12.05	Totals for district	2,430.81	37,404

(a) situated immediately east of Padang Tikar Dua. (b) Tanjung Beringin is the most northerly district, and is situated inland.

== Padangtikar Island ==
The island of Padangtikar covers the western half of the district. It has an area of 1,008.39 km^{2} (including in the east a part of Batu Ampar town) of which some 74% is covered by evergreen broadleaf fores. The town of Padang Tikar is situated in the northwest corner of the island. The coastline of the island is 228.6 km, and the mean elevation is 16 metres. The highest elevation on the island reaches approximately 127 metres above sea level. The island is characterized by flat, low-lying plains.
