= Maya Karimata =

Island in Indonesia

Maya Karimata (now just called Maya or Maja) is an island in North Kayong Regency in West Kalimantan Province, Indonesia. Its area is 992.1 square kilometres (383.1 square miles). Maya Island and the Karimata Islands formerly comprised a single administrative district (kecamatan) within the Regency, but it has since been split into two, with one district covering Maya Island (and offshore islets to its west) and the other district covering the Karimata archipelago. It belongs to the Borneo archipelago and is situated at Lat: 1.15° S Long: 109.55° E The highest altitude of the island is 509 metres (1,670 feet). It has a shoreline of 140.5 km (87.3 mi). The principal town is Tanjungsatai
