= Kendawangan =

Kendawangan (Kecamatan Kendawangan)
- District
- Location within West Kalimantan

- Location in Kalimantan and Indonesia Kendawangan (Indonesia)
- Coordinates: 2°32′S 110°13′E
- Province: West Kalimantan

Area
  - Total: 5,859.09 km^{2} (2,262.21 sq mi)

Population (mid 2025 estimate)
  - Total: 55,646
  - Density: 9.4974/km^{2} (24.598/sq mi)
- Time zone: UTC+7 (WIB)

Kendawangan is an administrative district (kecamatan) of Ketapang Regency (Kabupaten Ketapang), one of the regencies of West Kalimantan province on the island of Borneo in Indonesia. In the extreme southwest of the province, it is bordered to the south by the Java Sea, to the west by the Karimata Strait, to the north by Matan Hilir Selatan and Marau Districts and to the east by Singkup, Air Upas and Manis Mata Districts. The district extends between 2° 0’ 0’’ and 3° 5’ 0’’ south, and between 110° 01’ 12’ and 110° 56’ 24’’ east, and covers a land area of 5,859.09 km^{2}. It had a population of 57,808 at the 2020 Census; the official estimate as at mid 2025 was 55,646.

== Geography ==
The principal drainage area in the district is that of the Great Penata River, which reaches the west coast of Kalimantan between the port town of Kendawangan Kiri on the north side of the river mouth (through which the export of bauxite ore from the Kendawangan mine is the main trade), and the villages of Keramat Jaya and Kendawangan Kanan on the south bank. The villages of Mekar Utama, Kenondong, Pangkalan Batu and Sungai Jelayan are situated in the north of the district, while Banjar Sari, Seriam, Bangkai Serai, Selimantan Jaya, Suka Harapan and Suka Damai are to the east and Pembedilan to the south. The remaining villages in the east of the district comprise Natai Kuini, Air Hitam Besar, Air Hitam Hulu, Air Tarap and Danau Buntar, which drain south into the Java Sea (Jelai District of Sukamara Regency is also part of this drainage area).

The district also contains the Kendawangan Estuarine Nature Reserve (Cagar Alam Muara Kendawangan), a national park area of Indonesia. There are some 30 islands off the west coast of the district, of which the two largest are Pulau Bawal and Pulau Gelam. Others include Bacau, Bintang Timur, Gambar, Iras, Jambat Besar, Jambat Kecil, Kelapa, Koca, Kucing, Lagan, Langau, Langir, Lukutkera, Malangnek, Malangpinggan, Mangkup, Manjin, Mensikur, Nanas, Penambun, Perantun, Sanggul, Sawi Besar, Sawi Kecil, Tanahmerah, Tating, Telukperiyuh and Tuntang.

== Administration ==
Kendawangan District is sub-divided into nineteen rural villages (desa), all listed below with their areas and populations as of mid 2025, all sharing the postcode 78862.

Kode Wilayah	Name of kelurahan or desa	Area in km^{2}	Population mid 2025 estimate
61.04.04.2006	Air Hitam Besar	250.25	3,680
61.04.04.2003	Kendawangan Kanan	650.34	2,021
61.04.04.2005	Bangkal Serai	311.62	2,005
61.04.04.2002	Banjar Sari	524.40	4,899
61.04.04.2001	Kendawangan Kiri	238.43	10,976
61.04.04.2004	Pangkalan Batu	260.55	1,482
61.04.04.2007	Suka Harapan	26.80	1,372
61.04.04.2008	Suka Damai	30.88	1,488
61.04.04.2009	Selimatan Jaya	183.52	3,046
61.04.04.2010	Danau Buntar	180.20	2,736
61.04.04.2011	Mekar Utama	290.45	9,119
61.04.04.2012	Pembedilan	1,575.69	1,793
61.04.04.2013	Air Hitam Hulu	103.70	2,335
61.04.04.2014	Natai Kuini	95.78	793
61.04.04.2015	Keramat Jaya	242.00	1,413
61.04.04.2016	Seriam	380.00	2,223
61.04.04.2017	Kedondong	180.00	1,839
61.04.04.2018	Sungai Jelayan	98.62	1,277
61.04.04.2019	Air Tarap	235.86	1,149
61.04.04	Totals	5,859.09	55,646
