= Ketapang Regency =

Regency in West Kalimantan, Indonesia

Ketapang Regency Kabupaten Ketapang
- Regency
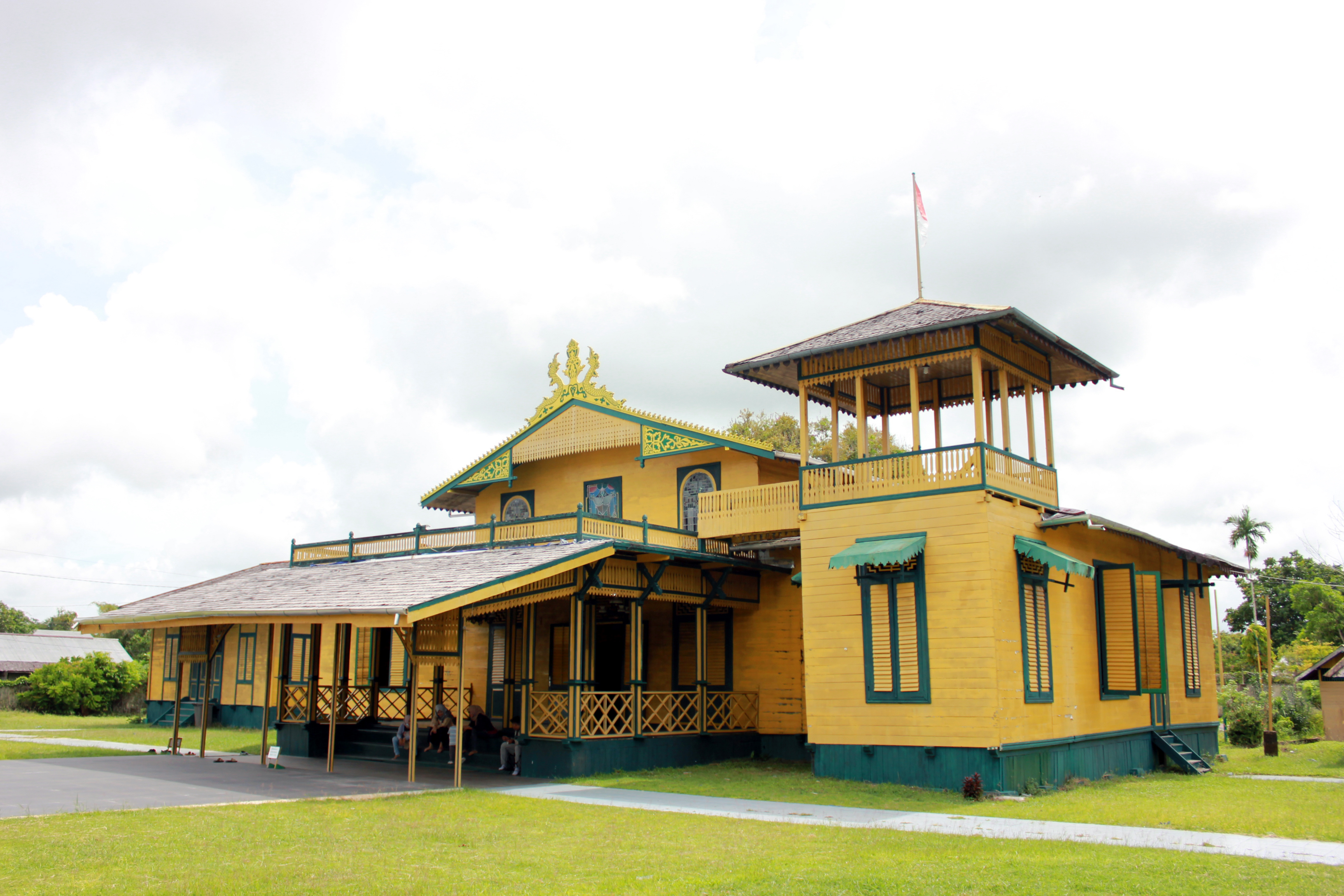
- Matan Palace, Ketapang

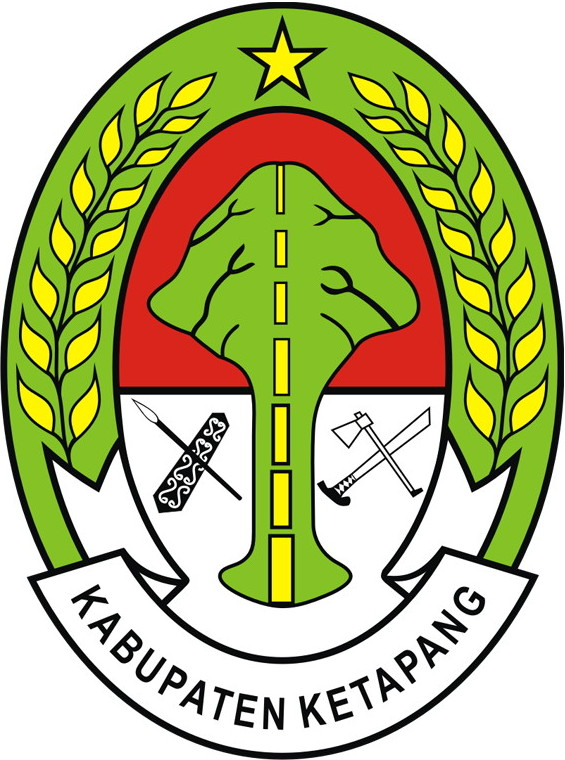
- Seal

- Location within West Kalimantan

- Location in Kalimantan and Indonesia Ketapang Regency (Indonesia)
- Coordinates: 1.5833°S 110.5000°E
- Country: Indonesia
- Province: West Kalimantan
- Capital: Ketapang

Government
  - Regent: Alexander Wilyo
  - Vice Regent: Jamhuri Amir

Area
  - Total: 30,012 km^{2} (11,588 sq mi)

Population (mid 2025 estimate)
  - Total: 607,049
  - Density: 20.227/km^{2} (52.387/sq mi)
- Time zone: UTC+7 (IWST)
- Area code: (+62) 534
- Website: ketapangkab.go.id

Ketapang Regency is a regency in the south of the province of West Kalimantan, on the island of Borneo in Indonesia. Until 2007 Ketapang Regency occupied an area of 34,120 km^{2} (roughly the same land area as the Kingdom of the Netherlands), but on 2 January 2007 five districts in the north-west of the regency were carved out to form a new North Kayong Regency.

The reduced Ketapang Regency has an area of 30,012 km^{2}, and at the census in 2010 it had 427,460 inhabitants; the 2020 census revealed a growth in population to 570,657 over the intervening decade; the official estimate as at mid 2025 was 607,049 (comprising 314,957 males and 292,092 females). The principal town lies at Ketapang, whose urban area consists of the districts of Benua Kayong (except the desa of Negeri Baru) and Delta Pawan, with a total population of about 137,000 inhabitants.

== Geography ==
Ketapang Regency occupies the most southern part of West Kalimantan Province. It is usually referred to locally as "Kayong", a term which also encompasses North Kayong. The Pawan River basin covers with major part of the regency, particularly the central and northeastern parts, with a catchment area of 11,508 km^{2}.

== Language ==
Ketapang Malay (or Kayong Malay) is spoken throughout Ketapang Regency and North Kayong Regency. It is divided into several dialects, namely the Ketapang dialect, Teluk Melano dialect, Teluk Batang dialect, Sukadana dialect, and Kendawangan dialect, all of which are mutually intelligible, but which differ from the forms of Pontianak Malay and Sambas Malay spoken further north.

== Administrative districts ==
When Ketapang Regency was originally created, it consisted of the twelve districts of Kendawangan, Manis Mata, Marau, Singkup, Tumbang Titi, Matan Hilir, Nanga Tayap, Sandai, Simpang Hilir, Simpang Hulu, Sukadana and Maya Karimata Islands. In 1988, Matan Hilir district was divided into two districts, namely Matan Hilir Utara and Matan Hilir Selatan. On 17 June 1996, Teluk Batang district was established by split off from the western part of Simpang Hilir district. In 2003, five new districts were established; Delta Pawan (equating to Ketapang town) and Muara Pawan districts were split off from the southern part of Matan Hilir Utara district, Benua Kayong district was split off from northern part of Matan Hilir Selatan district, Hulu Sungai district was split off from eastern part of Sandai district, Simpang Dua was split off from the southern part of Simpang Hulu district, Air Upas and Singkup districts were split off from the southeastern and southwestern parts of Marau district, respectively. In 2005, another three new districts were created (Seponti district was cut out from the northwestern part of Teluk Batang district, Pemahan and Sungai Melayu Rayak districts were cut out from the northern and western parts of Tumbang Titi district, respectively). In 2007, a new district named Jelai Hulu was carved out from the northeastern part of Kendawangan district.

Following the splitting off of the five districts to form the North Kayong Regency in January 2007, the Ketapang Regency now consists of twenty districts (kecamatan), tabulated below with their areas and their populations at the 2010 census and the 2020 census; together with the official estimates as at mid 2025. In this table they are grouped for convenience into three geographical sectors (which have no administrative significance): a more rapidly growing southern sector ("Kayong Selatan") covering six districts, where the Kendawangan dialect is the usual linguistic constant; a central well-populated but geographically smaller sector ("Kayong Tengah") covering nine districts based on the Pawan River Estuary and the regency capital of Ketapang town; and an (inland) north-eastern sector ("Kayong Timur") covering just five districts with a much more sparse population. The table includes the locations of the district administrative centres, the number of administrative villages in each district (totaling 253 rural desa and 9 urban kelurahan, the latter all in the urban area (kawasan perkotaan) of Ketapang town), and their post codes.

Kode Wilayah	Name of District (kecamatan)	Area in km^{2}	Pop'n census 2010	Pop'n census 2020	Pop'n estimate mid 2025	Admin centre	No. of villages	Post code
61.04.04	Kendawangan ^{(a)}	5,567	32,505	57,808	70,379	Kendawangan Kiri	19	78862
61.04.03	Manis Mata	2,767	24,627	34,658	37,677	Manis Mata	22	78864
61.04.02	Marau	1,102	11,901	17,283	19,076	Sukakarya	10	78865
61.04.22	Singkup	217	6,154	8,299	8,838	Sukaraja	8	78866
61.04.21	Air Upas	754	16,620	20,224	20,492	Air Upas	9	78863
61.04.14	Jelai Hulu ^{(b)} (Upper Jelai)	1,291	15,648	20,596	21,676	Periangan	22	78876
Southern sector	Sub-totals	11,698	107,455	158,868	178,138		90	
61.04.13	Tumbang Titi	1,137	23,286	28,938	29,621	Tumbang Titi	25	78877
61.04.24	Pemahan	309	4,446	5,781	6,048	Pebihingan	7	78874
61.04.25	Sungai Melayu Rayak	117	11,650	15,036	15,675	Sungai Melayu	11	78875
61.04.12	Matan Hilir Selatan (South Lower Matan)	1,723	30,528	40,289	42,457	Pesaguan Kanan	11	78822
61.04.18	Benua Kayong	331	35,165	45,047	46,792	Tuan Tuan	11 ^{(c)}	78821: 78822
61.04.01	Matan Hilir Utara (North Lower Matan)	685	14,739	19,992	21,349	Kuala Tolak	5	78813
61.04.16	Delta Pawan (Ketapang town) ^{(d)}	69	71,509	90,634	93,663	Ketapang	9 ^{(e)}	78811: 78813
61.04.17	Muara Pawan	579	13,109	18,039	19,398	Sungai Awan Kiri	8	78810
61.04.11	Nanga Tayap ^{(f)}	1,642	27,490	36,378	38,386	Nanga Tayap	20	78873
Central sector	Sub-totals	6,592	231,922	300,134	313,389		107	
61.04.05	Sandai	1,689	24,474	32,374	34,155	Sandai	13	78870
61.04.19	Hulu Sungai	4,451	11,553	13,884	13,983	Menyumbung	12	78871
61.04.07	Sungai Laur	1,570	16,702	19,248	18,996	Riam Bunut	19	78872
61.04.08	Simpang Hulu (Upper Simpang)	3,016	27,847	36,864	38,906	Balai Pinang	15	78850
61.04.20	Simpang Dua	996	7,507	9,285	9,482	Semandang Kanan	6	78854
Northern sector	Sub-totals	11,722	88,083	111,655	115,522		65	
	Totals	30,012	427,460	570,657	607,049	Ketapang	262	

Notes: (a) includes some 30 offshore islands, mainly off the southwest coast, of which the largest are Pulau Bawal and Pulau Gelam (administered as part of Kendawangan Kiri desa). The district contains a mine with one of the largest deposits of bauxite in Asia, exported through the port of Kendawangan Kiri, a town at the mouth of the Penata River on its north bank, with 10,966 inhabitants in 2024 (with a further 2,007 in Kendawangan Kanan on the south bank of the river).
(b) contains the upper reaches of the Jelai-Bila River basin, shared with Central Kalimantan province. (c) including four kelurahan - Kauman, Mulia Kerta, Tuan Tuan and Banjar.
(d) the urban area of Ketapang town includes all of Delta Pawan District and (on the south bank of the Pawan River) all except one desa of Benua Kayong District.
(e) including five kelurahan - Kantor, Tengah, Mulia Baru, Sampit and Sukaharja.
(f) inland from Matan Hilir Utara District, but containing the middle reach of the Pawan River, including the historic town of Tanjungpura, formerly capital of the Tanjungpura Kingdom.
