= Tanjungpura Kingdom =

Former kingdom in modern day West Kalimantan

Tanjungpura Kingdom Kerajaan Tanjungpura
- Flag used during the Matan Kingdom Era

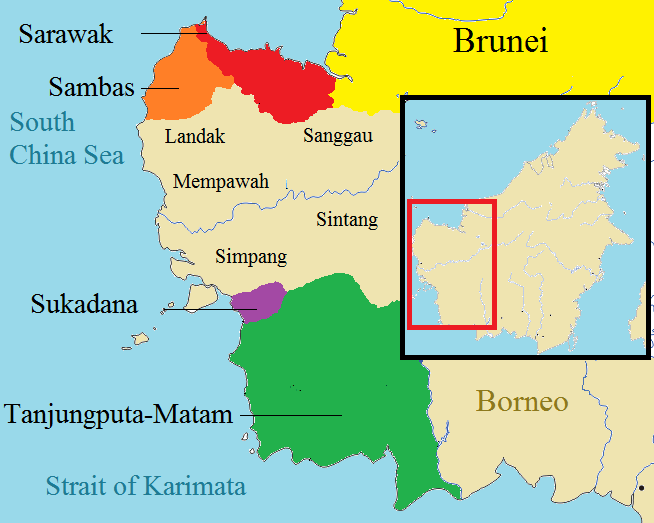
- Status: Part of the Dutch East Indies (from 1779)
- Capital: Tanjungpura; Negeri Baru (1487); Sukadana (1590); Sungai Matan; Indra Laya; Kartapura; Tanjungpura (resettle); Muliakarta
- Common languages: Malay
- Religion: Animism (first era), Hindu-Buddhist (middle era), Sunni Islam (final era)
- Government: Absolute Monarchy
- History
  - Established: 8th Century
  - Integration with Indonesia: 17 August 1950
Succeeded by
Indonesia
- Today part of: Indonesia

Tanjungpura Kingdom was an eighth century Malay kingdom located along the southwestern coast of Borneo facing the Java Sea, a region that today corresponds to the Ketapang Regency of West Kalimantan province of Indonesia. The kingdom experienced several moves of the royal capital, first located in Negeri Baru, Ketapang Regency, then moved to Sukadana, since Panembahan Sorgi (Giri Kesuma) embraced Islam.

Tanjungpura was once a province of the Singasari Kingdom as Bakulapura. The name "bakula" comes from Sanskrit which means a tanjung plant (Mimusops elengi), so that after being elongated it became Tanjungpura. Some of the descendants of this kingdom are scattered in several regions due to marriage, etc. There are those who live in Mempawah, Pontianak and several other cities. There are some descendants of this kingdom who released their titles and did not use their royal titles.

== Territory ==
Map of maritime Southeast Asia in the 14th century

Tanjungpura's territory stretched from Tanjung Dato to Tanjung Sambar. The island of ancient Borneo was divided into three major kingdoms: Brunei, Sukadana (Tanjungpura) and Banjarmasin. However, recent studies suggest that Poli (or Poni) refers to a Santubong kingdom at the mouth of the Sarawak River, which was once called Punik estuary. Tanjung Dato is the border between the Borneo (Brunei) mandala and the Sukadana (Tanjungpura) mandala, while Tanjung Sambar is the border between the Sukadana/Tanjungpura mandala and the Banjarmasin mandala (Kotawaringin area). The watershed of the Jelai-Bila River in Kotawaringin is under the control of Banjarmasin, while the Kendawangan River is under the control of Sukadana Kingdom. Inland borders, the headwaters of the Pinoh (Lawai) river basin were included in the territory of the Kotawaringin Sultanate (subordinate to Banjarmasin).

During the time of Mahapatih Gajah Mada and Hayam Wuruk as mentioned in Kakawin Nagarakretagama, the Negeri Tanjungpura became the capital of the areas claimed as Majapahit conquests in Tanjungnagara Nusa (Kalimantan). Majapahit claimed the former conquered areas of Srivijaya on the island of Borneo and its surroundings. The name Tanjungpura was often used to refer to the island of Borneo at that time. Other opinions assume that Tanjungpura was in South Kalimantan as a more strategic base to control a wider area. According to the Pararaton, Bhre Tanjungpura was the son of Bhre Tumapel II (Suhita's brother). Bhre Tanjungpura was named Manggalawardhani Dyah Suragharini who ruled 1429-1464, she was the daughter-in-law of Bhre Tumapel III Kertawijaya. Later, the Trailokyapuri inscription mentions Manggalawardhani Dyah Suragharini as Bhre Daha VI (1464-1474). In the mandala (circle) of Majapahit, Ratu Majapahit is the prasada, while Mahapatih Gajahmada is the pranala (link), while Madura and Tanjungpura are the ansa (handle or shade).

== Movements of the royal capital ==
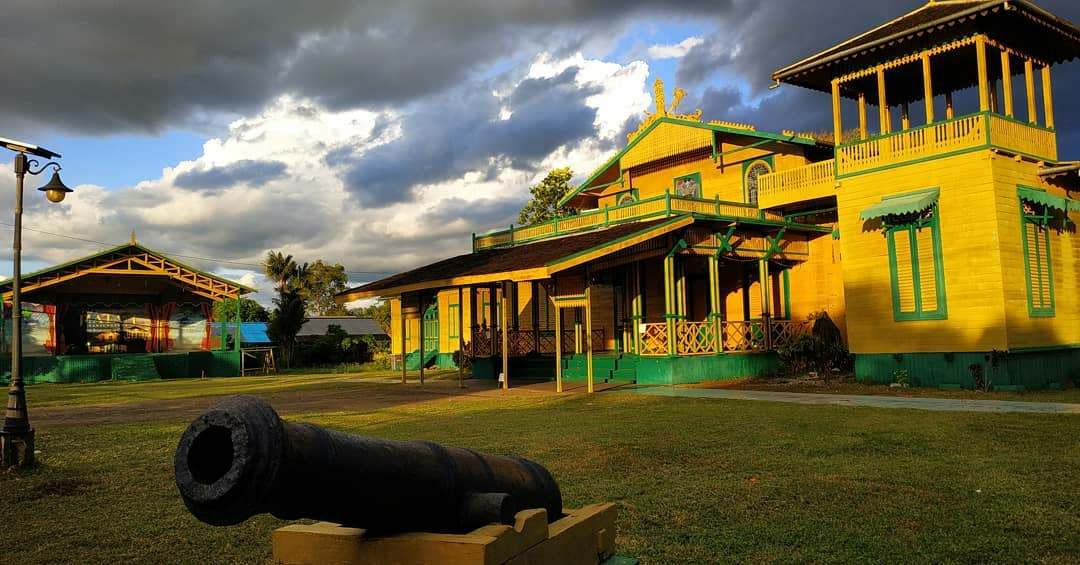
Royal Palace (Keraton) of Tanjungpura

The capital city of Tanjungpura Kingdom moved several times from one place to another. Some of the reasons why Tanjungpura Kingdom moved its capital were mainly due to attacks from pirate gangs, known as Lanon (possibly related to the Iranun people of modern-day Philippines). Starting from the end of the 15th century, the Tanjungpura Kingdom often changed the centre of government to defend itself because it was often attacked by other kingdoms. The frequent movement of the capital of the Tanjungpura Kingdom is evidenced by the historical sites found in the former capitals of the kingdom. Negeri Baru in Ketapang is one of the places that was once the centre of the Tanjungpura Kingdom. From Negeri Baru, the capital of the Tanjungpura Kingdom moved to Sukadana. During the reign of Sultan Muhammad Zainuddin (1665-1724), the centre of the palace shifted again, this time placed in the Sungai Matan area. This is where the history of the Matan Kingdom began. A Dutch writer referred to the area as the Matan Kingdom, although the actual name of the kingdom at that time was still the Tanjungpura Kingdom. The centre of government moved again in 1637 to the Indra Laya region. Creating the Indra Laya Kingdom. Indra Laya is the name of a place on the banks of the Puye River, a tributary of the Pawan River. The Tanjungpura Kingdom moved again to Kartapura, then to Tanjungpura Village, and finally moved again to Muliakerta where the Muhammad Saunan Palace now stands.

=== Sukadana Kingdom relocation theory ===
According to the notes of Gusti Iswadi, S.sos in the book Pesona Tanah Kayong, Tanjungpura Kingdom in historical perspective mentioned, that, from the new country of Tanjungpura kingdom moved to Sukadana so called Sukadana Kingdom, then moved again to Sungai Matan (now Kecamatan Simpang Hilir). And during the reign of Sultan Muhammad Zainuddin, around 1637, moved again to Indra Laya so it was called the Indralaya Kingdom. Indra Laya is the name of a place on the Puye River, a tributary of the Pawan River in Sandai District. Then it was called Kartapura Kingdom because it moved again to Karta Pura in Tanah Merah village, Nanga Tayap sub-district, then to Tanjungpura Village now (Muara Pawan sub-district) and finally moved again to Muliakarta in the Muhammad Saunan Palace which is now the last as the centre of self-government.

Evidence of the existence of the rest of this kingdom can be seen with the existence of old tombs in these cities, which are silent witnesses to the rest of the Tanjungpura kingdom. To maintain this heritage the Ketapang Regency government has conducted restoration and maintenance in the place of the royal heritage. The goal is that young generations can learn the glory of the Tanjungpura kingdom in the past.

== History ==
=== Hindu Period ===
At the time of King Brawijaya reigned in Majapahit, the crown prince of Majapahit, Prabu Jaya, was exiled by his brothers to Kandang Kerbau in Matan. The crown prince was then married a Dayak princess, Dayang Putung, and build a kingdom in Kuala Kandang Kerbau. They had three sons:

1. Pangeran Prabu, titled Raja Baparung, the founder of the Sultanate of Sukadana (circa 1400 AD)
2. Gusti Likar, enthroned at Meliau
3. Prince Mancar, enthroned at the Sultanate of Tayan

After Raja Baparung died, his son, karang Tunjung, was enthroned in 1431. The life pattern of this sultanate at that time is agriculture and the sultanate was known as the Sultanate of Tanjungpura. In 1501, King Karang Tunjung died and was succeeded by his son, Panembahan Kalahrang. In the reign of this king, the Sutanate of Matan widened its territory so that it consisted of Tanjung Datuk, Tanjung Putting, Sintang, and Karimata, and had even made a trade relation with Majapahit.

In 1502, Panembahan Bandala was on the throne and the people's life pattern had changed into maritime pattern. His successor was Sibiring Mambal, titled Pangeran Dibarok, because the crown prince, Giri Kesuma, was at that time still under age. Pangeran Dibarok ruled between 1538–1550 AD.

=== Islamic Period ===
In 1550, at the time of Pangeran Giri Kesuma, who was the husband of Ratu Mas Jintan, the princess of the Sultanate of Landak, Islam was spreading across the Sultanate of Matan. The missionary was Syeh Husein. Pangeran Giri Kesuma then gave a title to the son of syeh Husein, Syarif Hasan, as Sultan Aliuddin. After Pangeran Giri Kesuma died, Ratu Mas Jintan was enthroned as a female queen titled Ratu Sukadana (Queen Sukadana).

The Dutch came to Sukadana in 1604 and fought a war with Queen Sukadana until the queen was replaced by another Queen, Panembahan Air Mala. In this period also Adipati Kendal with his Mataram Expedition, attacked Matan (1622). Panembahan Air Mala was replaced by Sultan Aliuddin who also known as Sultan Muhammad Syarifuddin. Sultan Aliudin was the ancestor of the kings whom ruled the Sultanate of Matan-Tanjungpura afterward.

== List of rulers ==
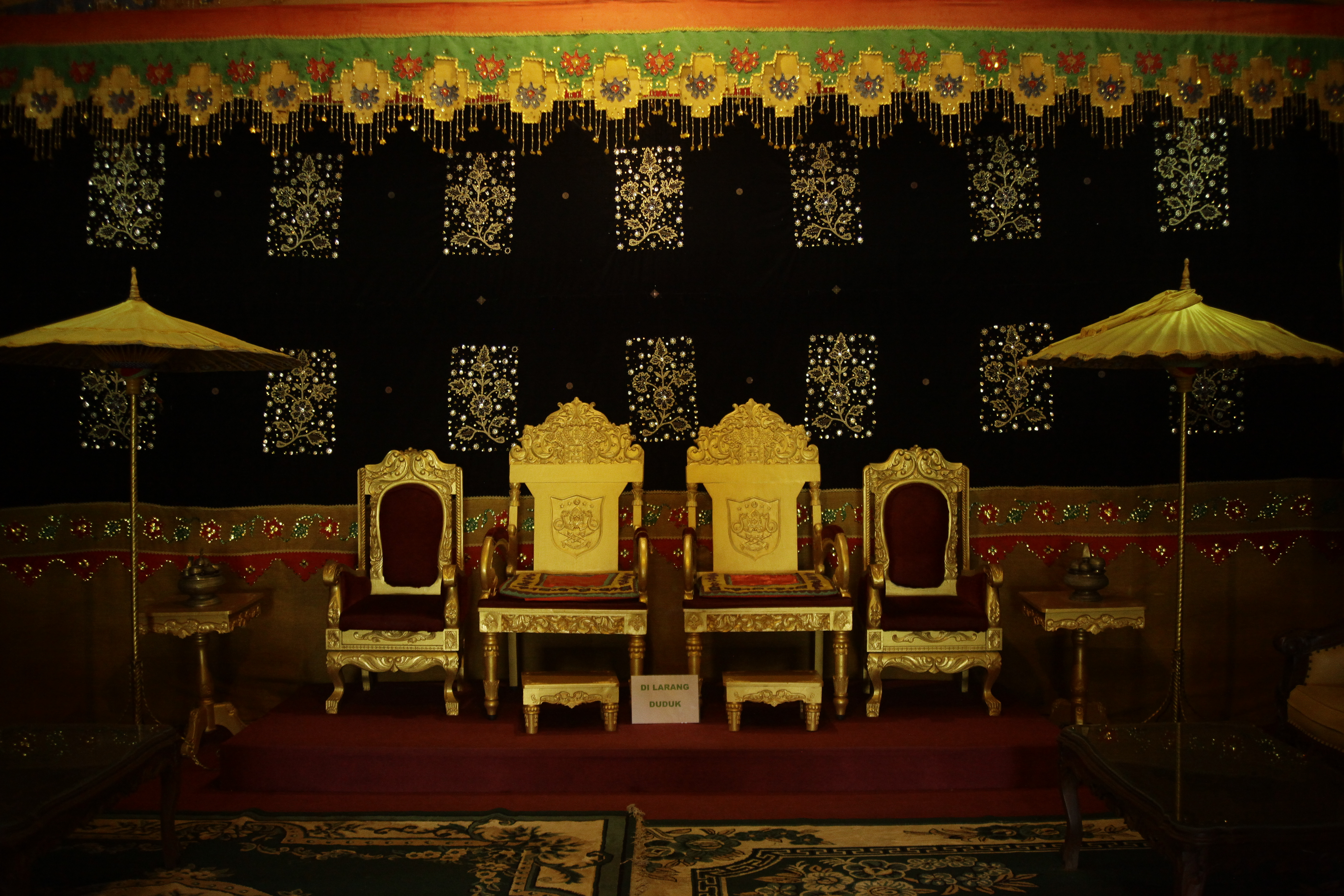
Keraton Matan throne room

In tracing the kings who once led the Matan Kingdom, it is also worth knowing the genealogy of the kings of the Tanjungpura Kingdom because these two kingdoms are actually still in one long historical series. Since there are several versions of the history and genealogy of the kings of Tanjungpura and other kingdoms that are still in the same series, the following is presented according to one version, namely based on the book Sekilas Menapak Langkah Kerajaan Tanjungpura (2007) edited by Drs. H. Gusti Mhd. Mulia:

=== According to Drs. H. Gusti Mhd. Mulia ===
==== Tanjungpura Kingdom ====
1. Brawijaya (1454–1472)
2. Bapurung (1472–1487)
3. Panembahan Karang Tanjung (1487–1504)

During the reign of Panembahan Karang Tanjung, the centre of the Tanjungpura Kingdom which was originally located in Negeri Baru was moved to Sukadana, thus changing the name of the kingdom to Sukadana Kingdom. Sukadana is the name mentioned for this kingdom in the Hikayat Banjar.

==== Sukadana Kingdom ====
A map created by Oliver van Noord in 1600, depicted the locations of Succadano, Tamanpure, Cota Matan, and Loue.

1. Panembahan Karang Tanjung (1487–1504)
2. Gusti Syamsudin or Pundong Asap or Panembahan Sang Ratu Agung (1504–1518)
3. Gusti Abdul Wahab or Panembahan Bendala (1518–1533)
4. Panembahan Pangeran Anom (1526–1533)
5. Panembahan Baroh (1533–1590)
6. Gusti Aliuddin or Giri Kesuma or Panembahan Sorgi (1590–1604)
7. Ratu Mas Jaintan (1604?1622)
8. Giri Mustaka or Murong-Giri Mustafa or Sultan Muhammad Syaifuddin or Raden Saradipa/Saradewa (1622–1665); Son-in-law of Ratu Bagawan of Kotawaringin
  1. Gusti Kesuma Matan (Raden Buyut Kesuma Matan) or Pangeran Muda (alias Pangeran Putra).

This was the last king of the Sukadana Kingdom as well as the first king of the Tanjungpura Kingdom with the title Sultan.

==== Matan Sultanate ====
1. Gusti Jakar Kencana atau Sultan Muhammad Zainuddin atau Sulthan Ratoe (1665–1724)
2. Gusti Kesuma Bandan atau Sultan Muhammad Muazzuddin atau Marhum Negeri Laya.(1724–1738)
3. Gusti Bendung atau Pangeran Ratu Agung atau Sultan Muhammad Tajuddin (1738–1749)
4. Gusti Kencuran atau Sultan Ahmad Kamaluddin atau Marhum Indra Laya (1749–1762)
5. Gusti Asma atau Pangeran Ratu atau Sultan Muhammad Jamaluddin (1762–1819)

Gusti Asma was the last king of Matan Kingdom and during his reign, This then leads to a further fragmentation within the kingdom. The centre of Matan Kingdom was moved to Simpang, and the name of the kingdom was changed to Simpang Kingdom or Simpang-Matan Kingdom. Whilst another kingdom was led Kayong-Matan Kingdom (also named Second Tanjungpura Kingdom).

==== Simpang-Matan Kingdom ====
1. Gusti Asma atau Sultan Muhammad Jamaluddin atau Marhoem Tijang-Tiga atau Marhoem Indra Poera (1762–1819). Anak Sultan Ahmad Kamaluddin
2. Gusti Mahmud atau Panembahan Anom Suryaningrat (1819–1845). Menantu Sultan Ahmad Kamaluddin
3. Gusti Muhammad Roem atau Panembahan Anom Kesumaningrat (1845–1889). Anak Panembahan Anom Suryaningrat
4. Gusti Panji atau Panembahan Suryaningrat (1889–1920)
5. Gusti Roem atau Panembahan Gusti Roem (1912–1942)
6. Gusti Mesir atau Panembahan Gusti Mesir (1942–1943)
7. Gusti Ibrahim (1945)

Gusti Mesir became a prisoner of the Imperial Japanese army who captured Indonesia from the Dutch in 1942, so there was a government vacuum in the Kingdom of Simpang. At the end of the Japanese occupation in Indonesia, around 1945, Gusti Ibrahim, the son of Gusti Egypt, was appointed as king. However, because at that time Gusti Ibrahim was only 14 years old, the wheels of government were run by the royal family, namely Gusti Mahmud or Mangkubumi who led the Simpang Kingdom until his death in 1952.

==== Kayong-Matan Kingdom (Tanjungpura II) ====
1. Gusti Irawan atau Sultan Mangkurat
2. Pangeran Agung
3. Sultan Mangkurat Berputra
4. Panembahan Anom Kesuma Negara atau Muhammad Zainuddin Mursal (1829-1833)
5. Pangeran Muhammad Sabran
6. Gusti Muhammad Saunan

According to the Staatsblad van Nederlandisch Indië of 1849, the territories of these kingdoms were included in the Wester-afdeeling based on the Bêsluit van den Minister van Staat, Gouverneur-Generaal van Nederlandsch-Indie, on 27 August 1849, No. 8 Although fragmented into several kingdoms, the kingdoms derived from the Tanjungpura Kingdom (Sukadana Kingdom, Simpang-Matan Kingdom, and Kayong-Matan Kingdom or Tanjungpura II Kingdom) still exist with their respective governments. The genealogy of the kings who once ruled in the Matan Kingdom (and before the establishment of the Matan Kingdom) above is one version that was successfully obtained.

=== According to the Matan Royal family ===
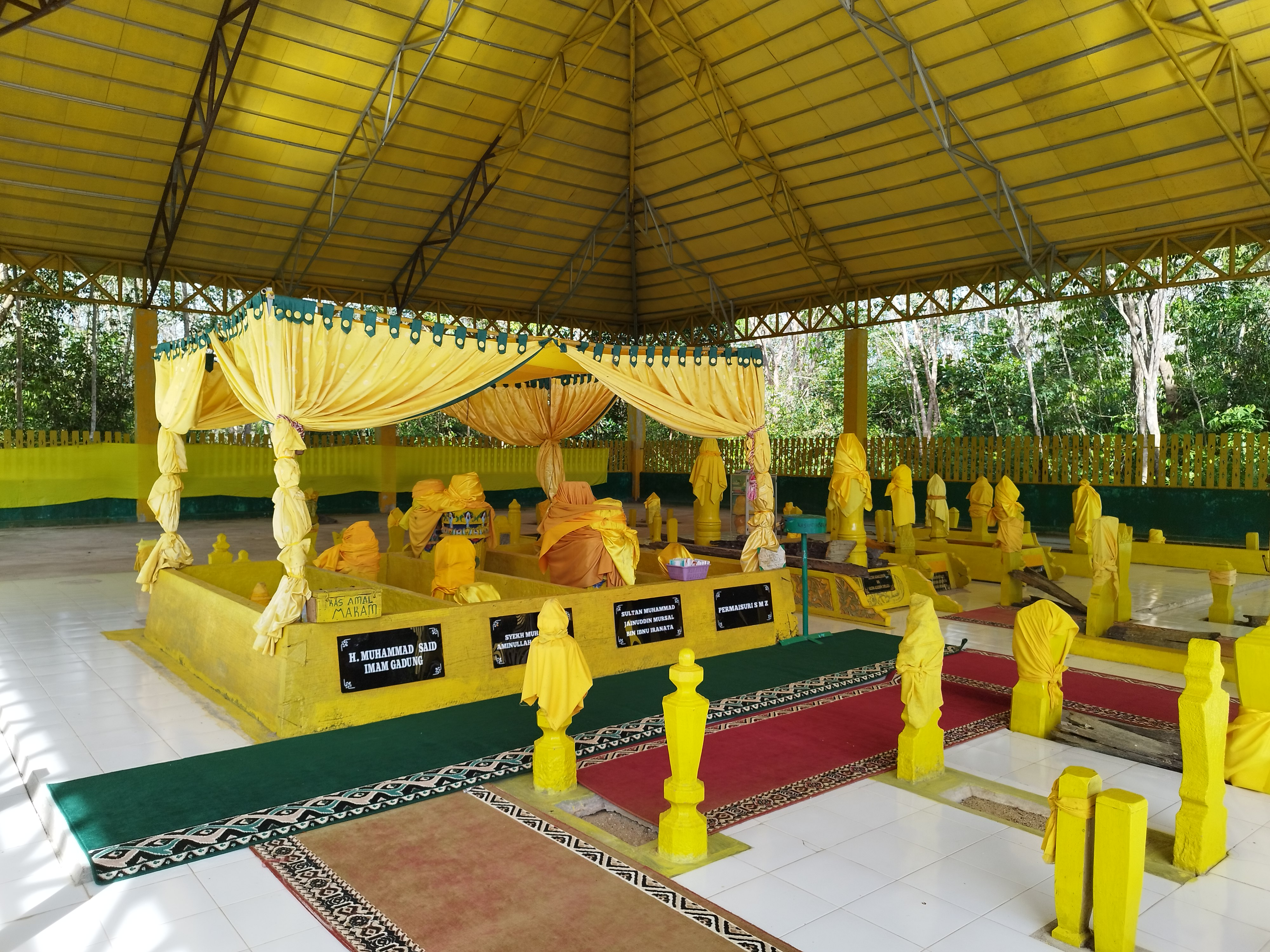
Tombs of the Matan & Tanjungpura Kings in Tanjungpura Village, Muara Pawan District, Ketapang Regency, West Kalimantan

There are other versions that also mention the genealogy of the kings of Matan obtained from the Matan Royal family itself by collecting data from various sources (P.J. Veth, 1854; J.U. Lontaan, 1975; H. von Dewall, 1862; J. Von Dewall, 1862; P.J. Barth, 1862). P.J. Barth, 1896; Genealogy of the Royal Family of Matan-Tanjungpura; Genealogy of Malay and Bugis Kings; Raja Ali Haji, Tufat al-Nafis; Harun Jelani, 2004; H.J. de Graaf, 2002; Gusti Kamboja, 2004), namely as follows:

==== Tanjungpura Kingdom ====
1. Sang Maniaka atau Krysna Pandita (800 M–?)
2. Hyang-Ta (900–977)
3. Siak Bahulun (977–1025)
4. Rangga Sentap (1290–?)
5. Prabu Jaya/Brawijaya (1447-1461)
6. Raja Baparung, Pangeran Prabu (1461–1481)
7. Karang Tunjung, Panembahan Pudong Prasap (1481–1501)
8. Panembahan Kalahirang (1501–1512)
9. Panembahan Bandala (1512–1538); Anak Kalahirang
10. Panembahan Anom (1538–1565); Saudara Panembahan Bandala
11. Panembahan Dibarokh atau Sibiring Mambal (1565?–1590)

==== Kingdom of Matan ====
1. Giri Kusuma (1590-1608); Son of Panembahan Bandala
2. Ratu Sukadana or Putri Bunku/Ratu Mas Jaintan (1608-1622); Wife of Giri Kusuma/Son of Ratu Prabu Landak
3. Panembahan Ayer Mala (1622-1630); Son of Panembahan Bandala
4. Sultan Muhammad Syafeiudin, Giri Mustaka, Panembahan Meliau or Pangeran Iranata/Cakra, (1630-1659); Son/Son-in-law of Giri Kusuma
5. Sultan Muhammad Zainuddin (1659-1725); Son of Pangeran Muda bin Sultan Muhammad Syaeiuddin
6. Pangeran Agung (1710-1711); power struggle
7. division of power, led the kingdom in Tanah Merah
  1. Prince Agung Martadipura (1725-1730); Son of Sultan Muhammad Zainuddin, power sharing, led the kingdom in Tanah Merah
  2. Prince Mangkurat or Sulthan Mangkoe Rat or Sultan Aliuddin Dinlaga (1728-1749); Son of Sultan Muhammad Zainuddin, power sharing in Sandai and Tanah Merah
8. division of power, led the kingdom in Simpang
  1. Pangeran Ratu Agung (1735-1740); Son of Sultan Muhammad Zainuddin, division of power, ruled the kingdom in Simpang
  2. Sultan Muazzidin Girilaya or Marhum Negeri Laya (1749-1762); Son of Pangeran Ratu Agung, ruled the kingdom in Simpang
9. Sultan Akhmad Kamaluddin/Panembahan Tiang Tiga (1762-1792); Son of Sultan Aliuddin Dinlaga
10. Sultan Muhammad Jamaluddin, formerly: Pangeran Ratu, formerly: Gusti Arma (1792-1830); Son of Sultan Akhmad Kalamuddin
11. Prince Adi Mangkurat Iradilaga or Panembahan Anom Kusuma Negara (1831-1843); Son of Prince Mangkurat
12. Pangeran Cakra yang Tua or Pangeran Jaya Anom (1843-1845); As acting prime minister, son of Pangeran Mangkurat
13. Panembahan Gusti Muhammad Sabran (1845-1908); Son of Panembahan Anom Kusuma Negara
14. Prince Admiral Uti Muchsin (1908-1924); Son of Panembahan Gusti Muhammad Sabran
15. Panembahan Gusti Muhammad Saunan or Pangeran Mas (1924-1943); Son of Gusti Muhammad Busra
16. Government Council of Matan Kingdom (1943-1948), consisting of Uti Halil (Pg. Mangku Negara), Uti Apilah (Pg. Adipati), Gusti Kencana (Pg. Anom Admiral)
17. The King Council of Matan Kingdom was led by Prince Ratu Kertanegara Gusti Kamboja; Prince Laksamana Anom Gst Fadlin, S.Sos and the late Prince Adipati Uti Iwan Kusnadi (since 1987-2015).

== Use of the royal name ==
Today the name of the kingdom is immortalised as the name of the state university in West Kalimantan, Tanjungpura University in Pontianak, and is also used by the Indonesian Army as the name of the military unit (Kodam) in Kubu Raya, Kodam XII/Tanjungpura.
