= Nanga Tayap =

Nanga Tayap (Kecamatan Nanga Tayap)
- District
- Location within West Kalimantan

- Location in Kalimantan and Indonesia Nanga Tayap (Indonesia)
- Coordinates: 1°51′S 109°59′E
- Province: West Kalimantan

Area
  - Total: 1,642 km^{2} (634 sq mi)

Population (mid 2025 estimate)
  - Total: 38,386
  - Density: 23.38/km^{2} (60.55/sq mi)
- Time zone: UTC+7 (WIB)

Nanga Tayap is an administrative district (kecamatan) of Ketapang Regency (Kabupaten Ketapang), one of the regencies of West Kalimantan province on the island of Borneo in Indonesia. The district covers a land area of 1,642 km^{2}, and had a population officially estimated at 38,386 in mid-2025.

== Administration ==
Nanga Tayap District is sub-divided into twenty rural villages (desa), all listed below with their areas and populations as of mid-2024, all sharing the postcode 78873.

Kode Wilayah	Name of kelurahan or desa	Area in km^{2}	Population mid 2024 estimate
61.04.11.2006	Sungai Kelik (Kelik River)	160.18	5,338
61.04.11.2008	Lembah Hijau II	8.10	1,316
61.04.11.2007	Lembah Hijau I	7.80	1,220
61.04.11.2001	Nanga Tayap (village)	86.02	5,204
61.04.11.2009	Siantau Raya	6.40	2,504
61.04.11.2005	Batumas	29.00	1,428
61.04.11.2004	Betenung	79.29	1,469
61.04.11.2003	Pangkalan Suka	349.00	1,564
61.04.11.2002	Pangkalan Telok	141.90	2,975
61.04.11.2010	Sebadak Raya	137.30	2,063
61.04.11.2011	Simpang Tiga Sembelangan	148.12	2,591
61.04.11.2012	Mensubang	87.95	1,989
61.04.11.2013	Tajok Kayong	108.23	1,219
61.04.11.2014	Kayong Utara (North Kayong)	64.41	697
61.04.11.2015	Kayong Hulu (Upper Kayong)	122.95	1,378
61.04.11.2016	Sepakat Jaya	84.00	2,140
61.04.11.2017	Cegolak	28.00	541
61.04.11.2018	Pateh Benteng	36.00	419
61.04.11.2019	Tanjung Medan	23.65	1,159
61.04.11.2020	Kayung Tuhe	19.82	770
61.04.11	Totals	1,728.12	37,984
