= Sukadana =

- Town
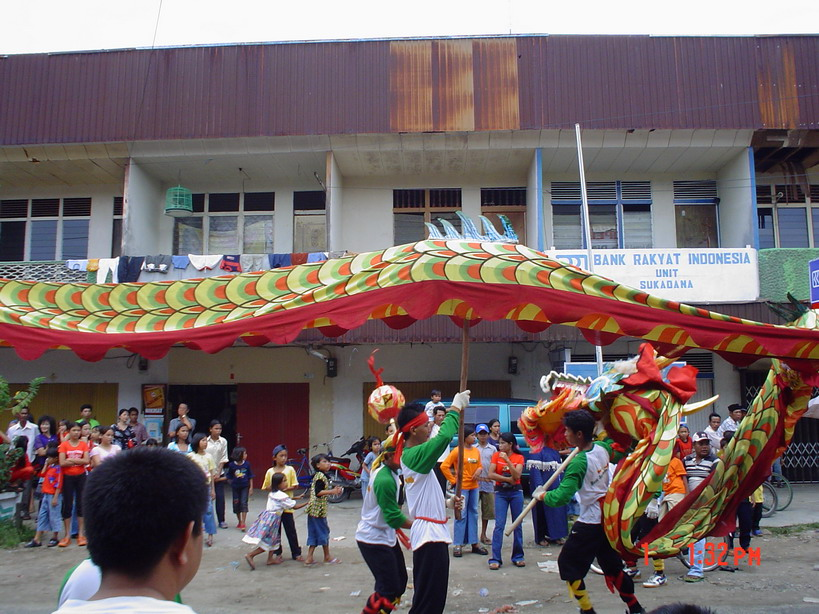
- Liong Chinese dragon dance on the street of Sukadana.
- Interactive map of Sukadana
- Coordinates: 1°15′0″S 109°57′0″E
- Country: Indonesia
- Province: West Kalimantan
- Regency: North Kayong Regency

Population
  - Total: 33,145

Sukadana (Malay: صوکادانا; Chinese: 巫律述) is a town and district (kecamatan) which serves as the regency seat of North Kayong Regency (Kabupaten Kayong Utara), on the island of Borneo. In mid 2025 it had 33,145 inhabitants. North Kayong is one of the regencies (kabupaten)of West Kalimantan province in Indonesia. The nearest airport is Rahadi Osman Airport which located at Ketapang Regency.

== History ==
Sukadana was once the capital of the Malay kingdom known as Tanjungpura. The name Sukadana comes from Sanskrit meaning 'a pleasant gift'. It was referred to by seventeenth and eighteenth-century European writers as Succadano or Succadana, noted for its port, and described as being "in the land of Candavangan" (i.e. Kendawangan). Succadano was also, confusingly, the name given to the Banjarmasin river, which flows south to meet the sea at Banjarmasin in southeastern Borneo, on the other side of the island.

== Administrative division ==
Sukadana district is divided into 10 villages, namely:

1. Benawai Agung
2. Gunung Sembilan
3. Harapan Mulia
4. Pampang Harapan
5. Pangkalan Buton
6. Riam Berasap Jaya
7. Sedahan Jaya
8. Sejahtera
9. Simpang Tiga
10. Sutera

== Economy ==
The main industries consists in the production of palm oil, rubber, and wood.

== Education ==
The current political leadership has made commitments to provide free education and health care to all residents and primary and secondary school fees that are paid elsewhere in Indonesia have been waived. There are no institutes of higher education.

== Health ==
The local government provides free public healthcare through clinics throughout the province, including a "floating clinic" based on a boat to serve the islands off the west coast of the regency. The NGO Alam Sehat Lestari (ASRI) also operates a clinic in Sukadana, which offers community-oriented conservation initiatives, such as offering discounted care to locals who commit to curbing illegal logging in the Gunung Palung National Park. The nearest hospitals are in the neighboring regency of Ketapang.

== Demographics ==
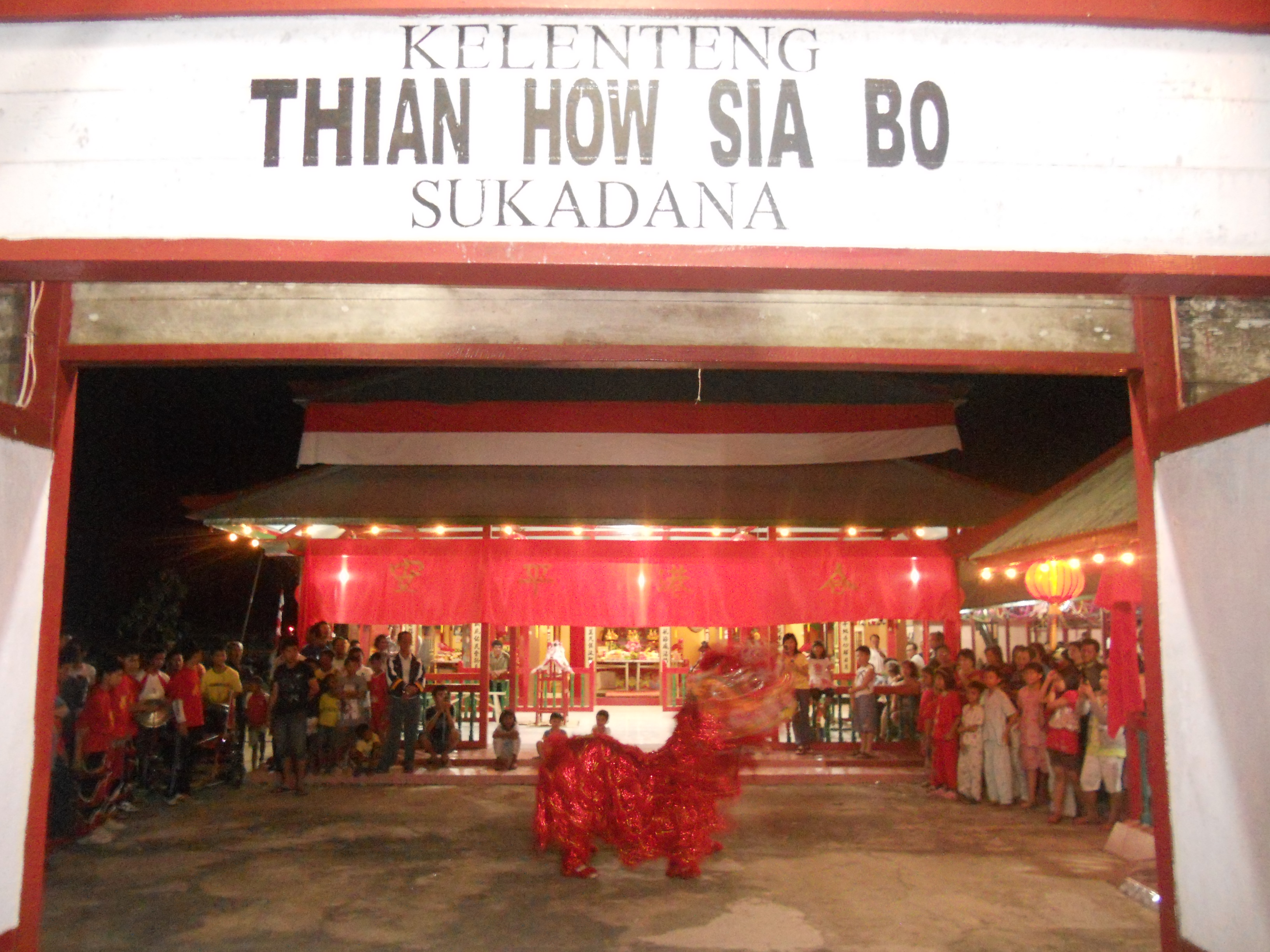
Chinese lion dance at Chinese temple.

The district covers an area of 469.31 km^{2}. In 2021, the population of Sukadana district was 30,779 people, with a density of 68 people per km^{2}. The percentage of the population of Sukadana district based on the religion they adhere to is Islam, which is 95.70%, Christianity as much as 1.29%, where Catholicism 0.69% and Protestantism 0.60%, then Hinduism as much as 1.55%, Buddhism 1.09%, and Confucianism 0.37%. In 2025 the population was 33,145, giving a density of 70.6 people per km^{2}.

== Transportation ==
The nearest airport is Rahadi Osman (Ketapang Airport). The airport has some connecting flights to Pontianak, Semarang via Pangkalan Bun, and Jakarta. Boats from Sukadana, Teluk Melano and Teluk Batang run daily to Pontianak.

== Places ==
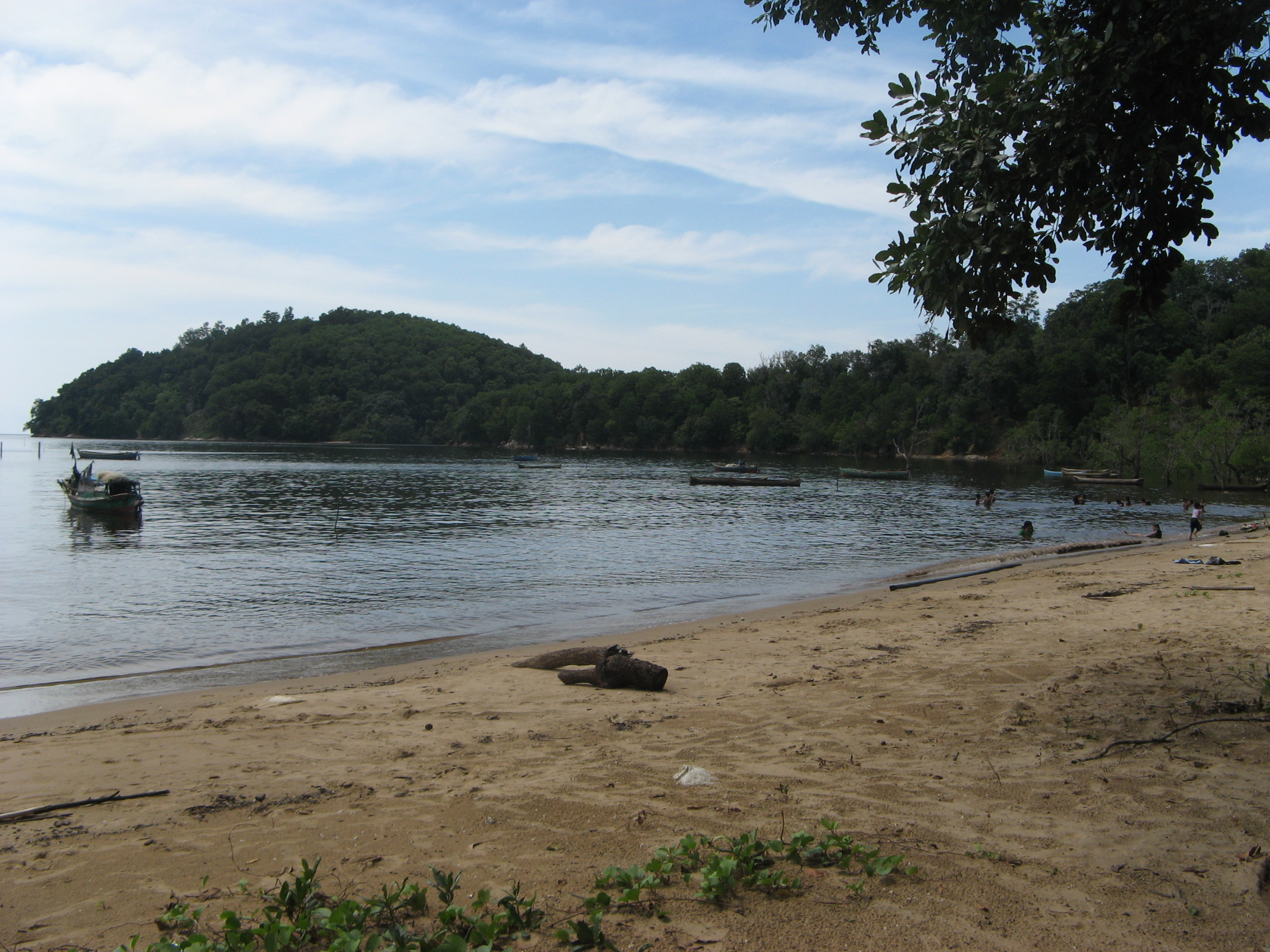
Pulau Datok Beach in the town of Sukadana.

- Gunung Palung National Park, a rainforest park that can be reached from Sukadana
- Pulau Datok Beach, a beach that is within the town of Sukadana
