= Matan Hilir Utara =

North Lower Matan (Matan Hilir Utara)
- District
- Location within West Kalimantan

- Location in Kalimantan and Indonesia North Lower Matan (Indonesia)
- Coordinates: 1°51′S 109°59′E
- Province: West Kalimantan

Area
  - Total: 685.0 km^{2} (264.5 sq mi)

Population (mid 2025 estimate)
  - Total: 21,349
  - Density: 31.17/km^{2} (80.72/sq mi)
- Time zone: UTC+7 (WIB)

North Lower Matan is an administrative district (kecamatan) of Ketapang Regency (Kabupaten Ketapang), one of the regencies of West Kalimantan province on the island of Borneo in Indonesia. The district was created in 1988 by the division of the original Matan Hilir District into two districts, namely Matan Hilir Utara and Matan Hilir Selatan. It covers a land area of 685 km^{2}, including the five small offshore islands of Pulau Kerengga, Pulau Sempadi Besar, Pulau Sempadi Kecil, Pulau Sempadi Laut and Pulau Babi Pelanjingan, and it had a population officially estimated at 21,349 in mid 2025.

== Administration ==
North Lower Matan District is subdivided into five rural villages (desa), all listed below with their areas and populations as of mid 2024, all sharing the postcode 78813.

Kode Wilayah	Name of kelurahan or desa	Area in km^{2}	Population mid 2024 estimate
61.04.01.2011	Sungai Putri (Putri River)	115.20	3,078
61.04.01.2012	Tanjung Baik Budi	122.88	4,692
61.04.01.2013	Kuala Tolak	94.60	5,180
61.04.01.2014	Kuala Satong	61.44	2,951
61.04.01.2015	Laman Satong	326.28	4,215
61.04.01	Totals	720.40	20,116
