= Tanjungpura =

Tanjungpura is a name of a small town in Ketapang Regency of West Kalimantan, Indonesia.

It was formerly the capital of the Tanjungpura Kingdom.
