= Kendawangan mine =

Bauxite mine in Indonesia

- Location: Kendawangan,, West Kalimantan, Indonesia
- Products: Bauxite

The Kendawangan mine is a large mine located in Indonesia in the south of the province of West Kalimantan. The Kendawangan deposit represents one of the largest bauxite reserve in Indonesia and one of the largest in Asia, having estimated reserves of 42 million tonnes. The ore is exported through the port town of Kendawangan, at the mouth of the Penata River.

== See also ==
- List of mines in Indonesia
