= Pematang Gadung =

Pematang Gadung is a village in the administrative district (kecamatan) of Matan Hilir Selatan ("Lower South Matan"), in Ketapang Regency, West Kalimantan Province of Indonesia. The village is located 30 km from the regency capital and is the only village in the district that still has a natural peat-swamp forest. The forest has a depth range of 3–7 m and an area in excess of 14,000 hectares. It is rich in flora and fauna including orangutans, proboscis monkey, Maroon leaf monkey, silvery lutung, long-tailed macaques, sun bears, Horsfield's tarsier, Large flying fox, deer, crocodiles and more than 250 species of birds, and more than 30 species of orchid.

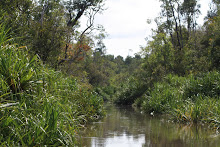
Image Of Pematang Gadung

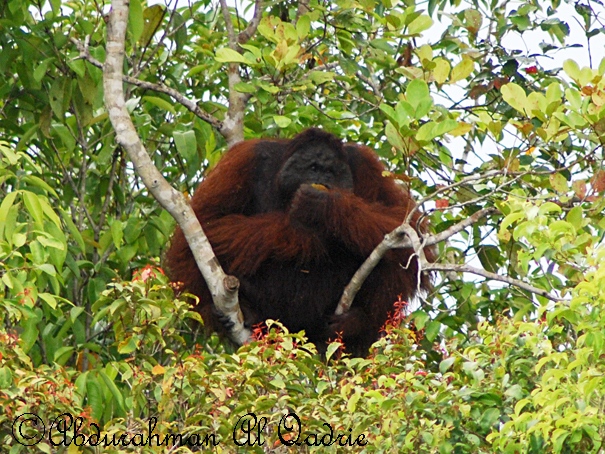
Big Orangutan in Pematang Gadung Peat Forest

== History ==
The name of "Pematang Gadung" comes from the "Pematang" and "Gadung". Pematang means the sand embankment between the marsh and the Gadung is the name of the plant (Dioscorea hispida). People believe that the plants can repel crocodiles, so in the past it was planted in a neighborhood that is close to the river. With the goal is not crocodile approaching the township.

The village is home to the Pematang Gadung Community Forest, a peat swamp forest that is home to around 800 wild orangutans. Logging of the forest has caused areas of the peat to become drained, and leaving the forest at risk of fire. In 2015 a massive wildfire broke out in the forest during the prolonged El Niño–Southern Oscillation dry season. Over 2,100 hectares of forest was burnt. Orangutan Outreach worked with the IAR Indonesia Foundation to reforest the area over a 12 month period. Over 11,000 seedlings were planted, and members of the community were educated on how to protect the local forest.

== Education ==
There are 1 kindergarten, 2 primary school ( 1 government primary school and 1 private primary school), and 1 junior high school. The junior high school has opened by 2012.
