= Karimata Islands =

Archipelago in West Kalimantan, Indonesia

Coordinates: 1°37′S 108°53′E

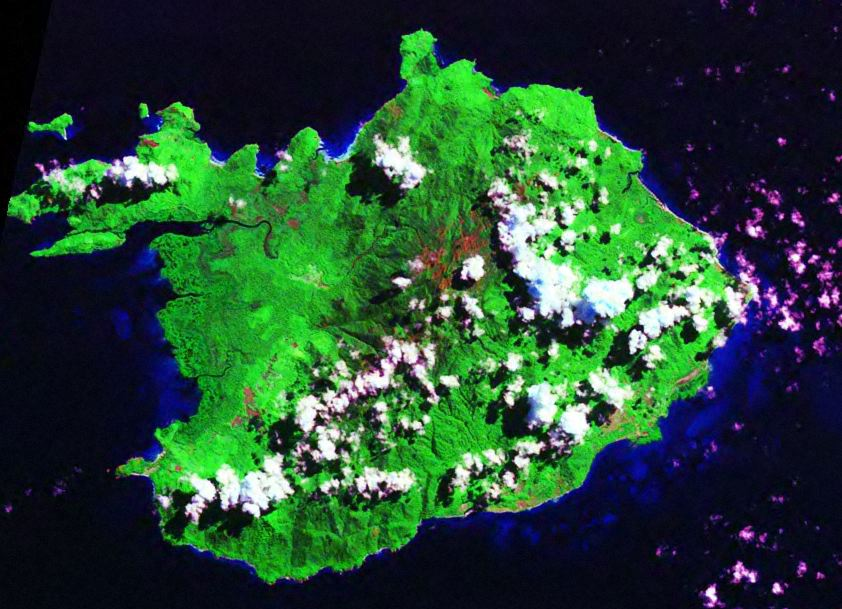
Karimata Island

The Karimata Islands are a chain of small islands off the west coast of Indonesian Borneo, the largest of which is (Pulau) Karimata, being about 20 km (12 mi) across (east-west). It is part of Kayong Utara Regency of West Kalimantan province in Indonesia. Karimata has a wide range of ecosystems, from mangroves and tropical rain forest in the lowlands to montane shrubland on the summit of the c.1,000 m (3,281 ft) mountain (a spectacular example of the Massenerhebung effect). The mountain is composed of granite. A substantial population of cave swiftlets has historically been the source of birds nests for birds nest soup, but has decreased recently to near extirpation, due to overharvesting by non-indigenous collectors from the mainland. A number of small villages are situated on the coast, the largest of which is Padang, on the eastern tip of the island. The island is known among the inhabitants of the west coast of Kalimantan to have a serious malaria problem.

Dutch explorers visited the island a number of times, and there have been at least two recent visits by biologists. The island is classified as a nature reserve by the Indonesian government, but there has been no management of the area. There are rumours of plans for large tourist developments.
