= Matan Hilir Selatan =

South Lower Matan (Matan Hilir Selatan)
- District
- Location within West Kalimantan

- Location in Kalimantan and Indonesia South Lower Matan (Indonesia)
- Coordinates: 1°51′S 109°59′E
- Province: West Kalimantan

Area
  - Total: 1,723.0 km^{2} (665.3 sq mi)

Population (mid 2025 estimate)
  - Total: 42,457
  - Density: 24.641/km^{2} (63.821/sq mi)
- Time zone: UTC+7 (WIB)

South Lower Matan is an administrative district (kecamatan) of Ketapang Regency (Kabupaten Ketapang), one of the regencies of West Kalimantan province on the island of Borneo in Indonesia. The district was created in 1988 by the division of the original Batan Hilir District into two districts, namely Matan Hilir Utara and Matan Hilir Selatan. It covers a land area of 1,723 km^{2}, including the small offshore islands of Pulau Cebe and Pulau Sentigi, and had a population officially estimated at 42,457 in mid-2025.

== Administration ==
South Lower Matan District is sub-divided into eleven rural villages (desa), all listed below with their areas and populations as of mid-2024, all sharing the postcode 78822.

Kode Wilayah	Name of kelurahan or desa	Area in km^{2}	Population mid 2024 estimate
61.04.12.2016	Sungai Nanjung (Nanjung River)	199.10	4,633
61.04.12.2014	Pesaguan Kanan	220.35	5,495
61.04.12.2007	Pesaguan Kiri	14.30	3,518
61.04.12.2012	Sungai Bakau (Bakau River)	90.00	3,302
61.04.12.2013	Pematang Gadung	138.20	3,500
61.04.12.2015	Sungai Besar (Great River)	284.20	5,484
61.04.12.2008	Sungai Pelang (Pelang River)	323.30	6,848
61.04.12.2006	Sungai Jawi (Jawi River)	21.00	3,601
61.04.12.2017	Kemuning Biutak	212.20	1,832
61.04.12.2018	Harapan Baru	120.45	2,979
61.04.12.2019	Pagar Mentimun	190.00	885
61.04.12	Totals	1,813.00	42,077
