= Pawan River =

River in Indonesia

Pawan River Sungai Pawan, Kerlau
- The Pawan at Ketapang

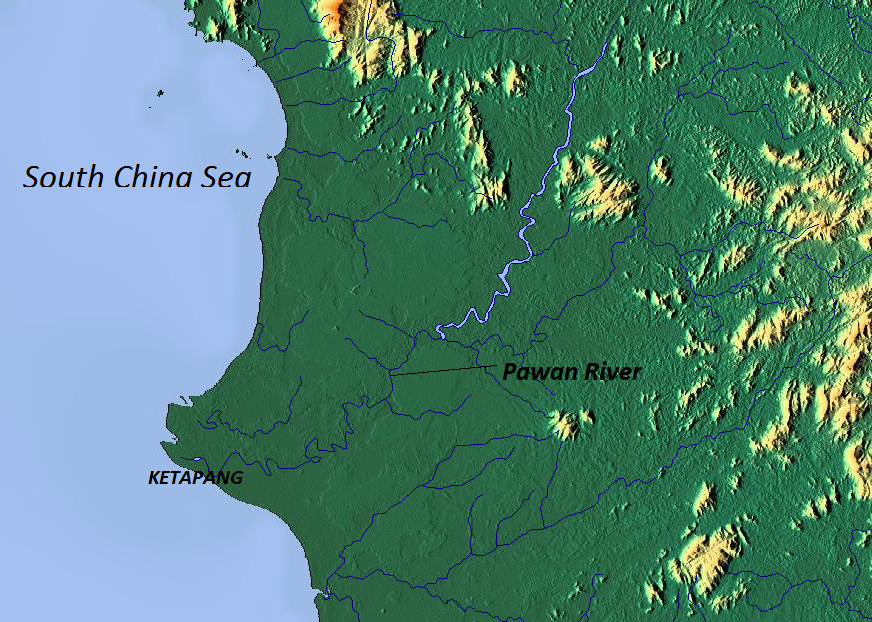
- Pawan River drainage basin

- River mouth location Pawan River (Indonesia)

Location
- Country: Indonesia

Physical characteristics
- Source
  - location: West Kalimantan, Borneo
- Length: 197 km (122 mi)
- Basin size: 13,400 km^{2} (5,200 mi^{2})
- Discharge
  - location: Pawan Delta, South China Sea
  - average: 1,215 m^{3}/s (42,900 cu ft/s)

Pawan River is a major river of West Kalimantan, Indonesia. It has a length of 197 kilometres (122 miles). Tributaries include the Keriau River.

== Hydrology ==
In its mid course, the Pawan River passes through the little town of Tandjoengpoera (Tanjungpura). The Pawan River passes through the large town and port of Ketapang before reaching the South China Sea at 1°49′30″S 109°55′9″E. It is 45 miles (72 km) to the south of Sukadana town. Sukadana means the "city of rays" and known as diamond city. The Pawan river drains into the sea near the present Ketapang through two estuaries; which are meandering channels. The depth of water here is about 6 feet (1.8 m) during spring tide. Tanjungpura is situated about 35 miles (56 km) in the upstream. The river forms one of the major river basins in West Kalimantan Province in the Ketapang Regency (478 kilometres (297 miles) from Pontianak) whose capital is Ketapang. Tropical peats have been identified in its basin area.

The river is navigable and bandungs ply on the river. Bandung is not only a transportation means for the people but also a housing unit a sincere they travel long the river course trading along the route in villages on the banks of the river.

== Geography ==
The river flows in the western area of Borneo island with predominantly tropical rainforest climate (designated as Af in the Köppen-Geiger climate classification). The annual average temperature in the area is 24 °C. The warmest month is June, when the average temperature is around 26 °C, and the coldest is January, at 22 °C. The average annual rainfall is 3702 mm. The wettest month is December, with an average of 505 mm rainfall, and the driest is September, with 140 mm rainfall.

== History ==
Historically the Pawan River passed through the Kingdom of Ulu. It has been inferred that the Pawan River basin was under the influence of powerful tribal group of the "Indianised Javanese kingdom of Majapahit", in the 15th century or earlier. Some traders of this group settled here in the valley in the coastal town of Sukadana and subsequently moved up along the river valley for trading in timber and other goods. Marriage alliances between the trading community and the tribal chiefs daughters legitimised the trading practices. From the 16th century onwards, the surrounding area, upstream of the river valley, was under the control of Dayak Kings (Indianized kings); this was a vast area of the "Dayak kingdom" not only in the upper Pawan River valley but it also extended to the upper Sekadau, across the basin boundary. This area was considered safe from attacks from the pirates and as a result, gold and diamond trade is stated to have flourished till the sultanate of Pontianak created serious economic hurdles to the kingdom of Sanggau.

== Forest area ==
The Ketapang Forest area is managed under the Forest Management District office (KPH) which has nine sub districts south of the Pawan River and five sub districts to the north of the river, in the Batu Ampar KPH in the Pontianak district.

=== Fauna ===
The Bornean orangutan, also found in the forest along the Pawan river in West Kalimantan, are facing severe habitat loss due to logging and clearing land for palm oil and related agriculture activities. Consequently, their population is declining. The orangutans in this region are from the sub-species Pongo pygmaeus wurmbii. They are different from the species found in Sumatra.

== See also ==
- List of drainage basins of Indonesia
- List of rivers of Indonesia
- List of rivers of Kalimantan
