= North Kayong Regency =

Regency in West Kalimantan, Indonesia

North Kayong Regency Kabupaten Kayong Utara
- Regency
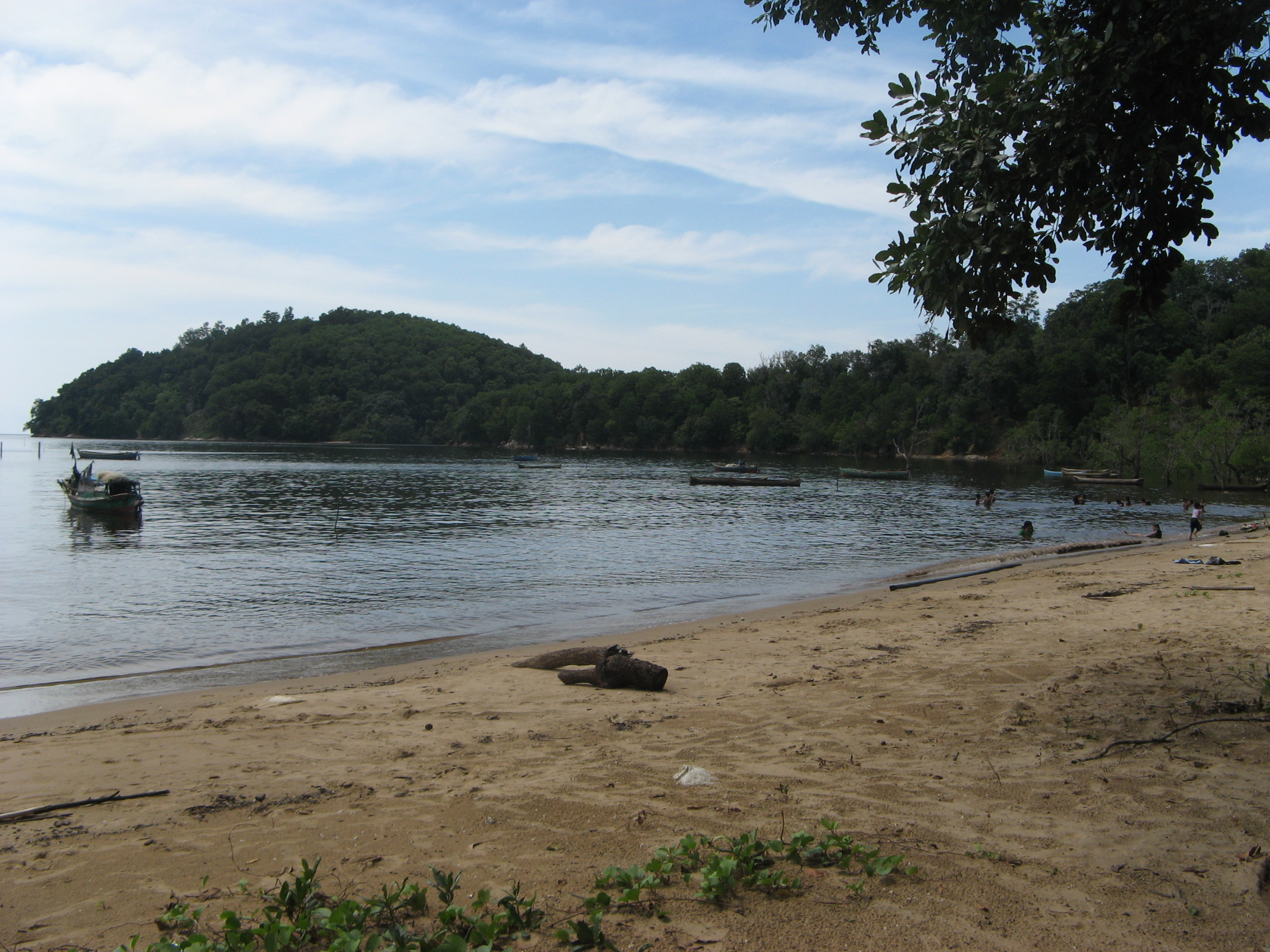
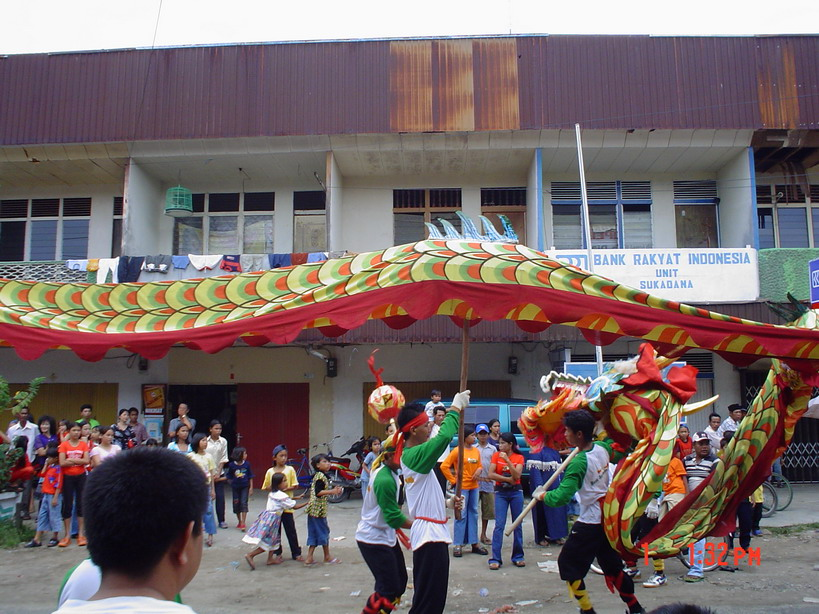
- From top to bottom: Datok Island Beach and Dragon dance liong at Sukadana

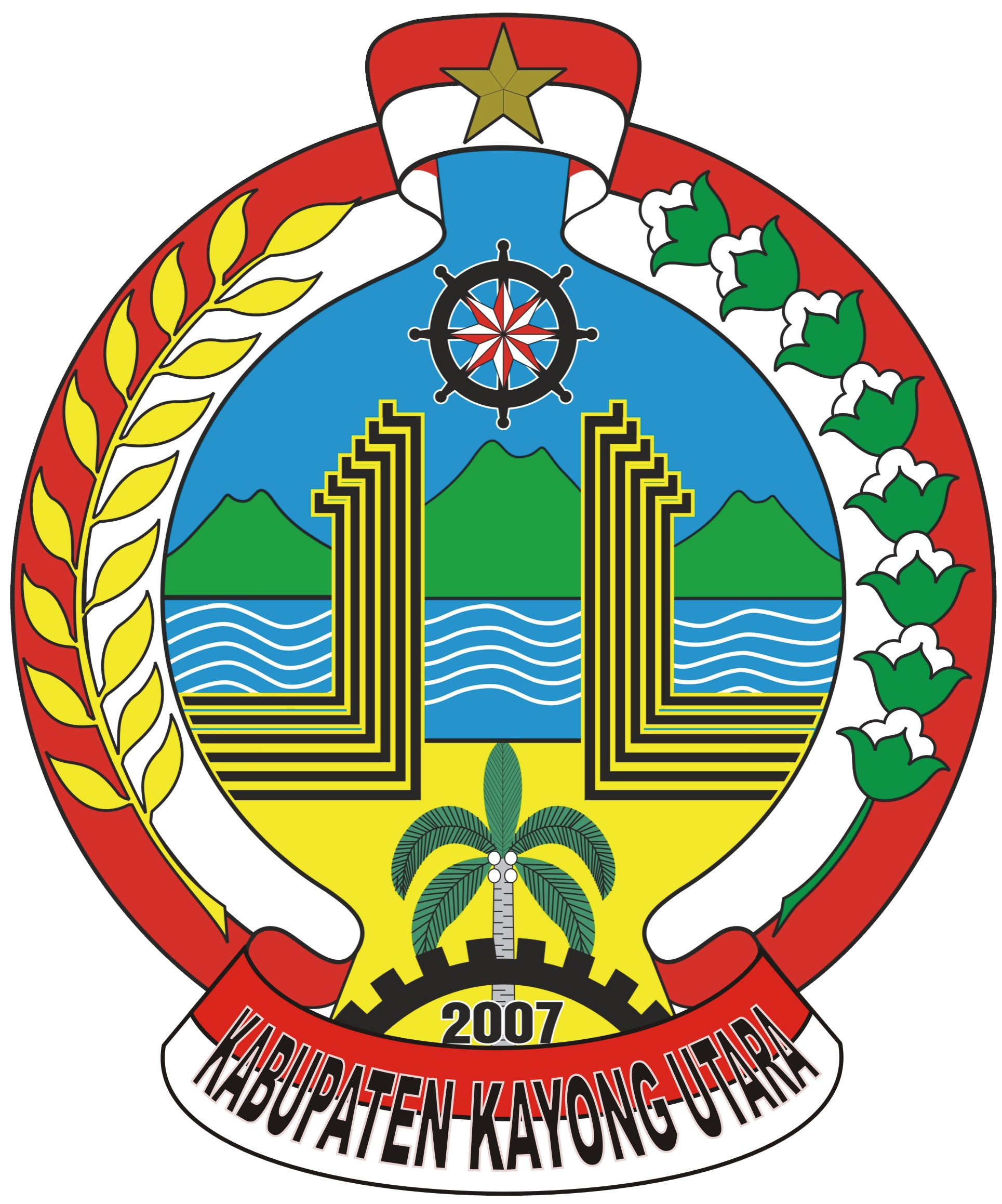
- Seal

- Location within West Kalimantan

- Location in Kalimantan and Indonesia North Kayong Regency (Indonesia)
- Coordinates: 0.9226°S 110.0450°E
- Country: Indonesia
- Province: West Kalimantan
- Capital: Sukadana

Government
  - Regent: Romi Wijaya
  - Vice Regent: Amru Chanwari

Area
  - Total: 4,110.12 km^{2} (1,586.93 sq mi)

Population (mid 2025 estimate)
  - Total: 128,040
  - Density: 31.152/km^{2} (80.684/sq mi)
- Time zone: UTC+7 (IWST)
- Area code: (+62) 535
- Website: kayongutarakab.go.id

North Kayong Regency is a regency of West Kalimantan province in Indonesia. It covers an area of 4,110.12 km^{2}, and had a population of 95,594 at the 2010 Census and 126,571 at the 2020 Census; the official estimate as at mid 2025 was 128,040 (comprising 65,880 males and 62,160 females). The principal town lies in Sukadana. The nearest airport is Ketapang Airport.

== History ==
North Kayong Regency was created on 2 January 2007, following a central government decision to split the area off from the Ketapang Regency, of which it was formerly the northwestern portion.

== Administrative districts ==
At the time of the 2010 Census, the North Kayong Regency consisted of five districts (kecamatan); subsequently, the offshore islands district of Pulau Maya Karimata has been split in two - Pulau Maya (a large island situated closer to the Kalimantan "mainland", with surrounding islets) and Kepulauan Karimata (an archipelago of 83 islands lying further to the west). The districts are tabulated below with their populations at the 2010 Census and the 2020 Census, together with the official estimates as at mid 2025. The table includes the locations of the district administrative centres, the number of administrative villages (all rural desa) in each district, and its post code.

Kode Wilayah	Name of District (kecamatan)	Area in km^{2}	Pop'n Census 2010	Pop'n Census 2020	Pop'n Estimate mid 2025	Admin centre	No. of villages	Post code
61.11.04	Pulau Maya ^{(a)} (Maya Island)	1,003.32	13,569	16,359	15,861	Tanjung Satai	5	78858
61.11.06	Kepulauan Karimata ^{(b)} (Karimata Islands)	254.97	3,050	3,765	4,068	Pelapis	3	78855
61.11.01	Sukadana ^{(c)}	469.31	21,407	29,651	33,145	Sutera	10	78852
61.11.02	Simpang Hilir ^{(d)}	1,797.82	28,249	38,594	37,642	Teluk Melano	12	78853
61.11.03	Teluk Batang (Batang Bay)	194.27	19,147	25,465	24,237	Teluk Batang	7	78856
61.11.05	Seponti	390.43	10,172	12,737	13,087	Seponti Jaya	6	78857
	Totals	4,110.12	95,594	126,571	128,040	Sukadana	43	

Note: (a) Maya Island comprises the five desa of Dusun Besar, Dusun Kecil, Kemboja, Satai Lestari and Tanjung Satai.
(b) This archipelago of 83 islands comprises the three desa of Padang, Pelapis and Betok Jaya. The largest island is Karimata, while others include Serutu Island to its southwest and Penebangan and Pelapis Islands to its northeast (between Karimata and the mainland of Kalimantan).
(c) including nine offshore islands - Bagu, Cermin, Datok, Juante, Katung, Lalang, Nanas, Payung and Salahnama. The administrative centre is at Sutera on the mainland, with 8,265 inhabitants as at mid 2024, with neighbouring Pangkalan Buton desa having a further 5,727 inhabitants.
(d) including offshore Pelintu Island.

== Economy ==
The main industries consists in the production of palm oil, rubber and wood.

== Education ==
The current political leadership has made commitments to provide free education and health care to all residents and primary and secondary school fees that are paid elsewhere in Indonesia have been waived. There are no institutes of higher education. The Regency is currently developing a polytechnic.

== Health ==
The local government provides free public health care through clinics throughout the province, including a ‘floating clinic’ based on a boat to serve the islands off the west coast of the regency. A privately run clinic is operated by the NGO ASRI in Sukadana town. The nearest hospitals are in the neighboring regency of Ketapang.

== Demographics ==
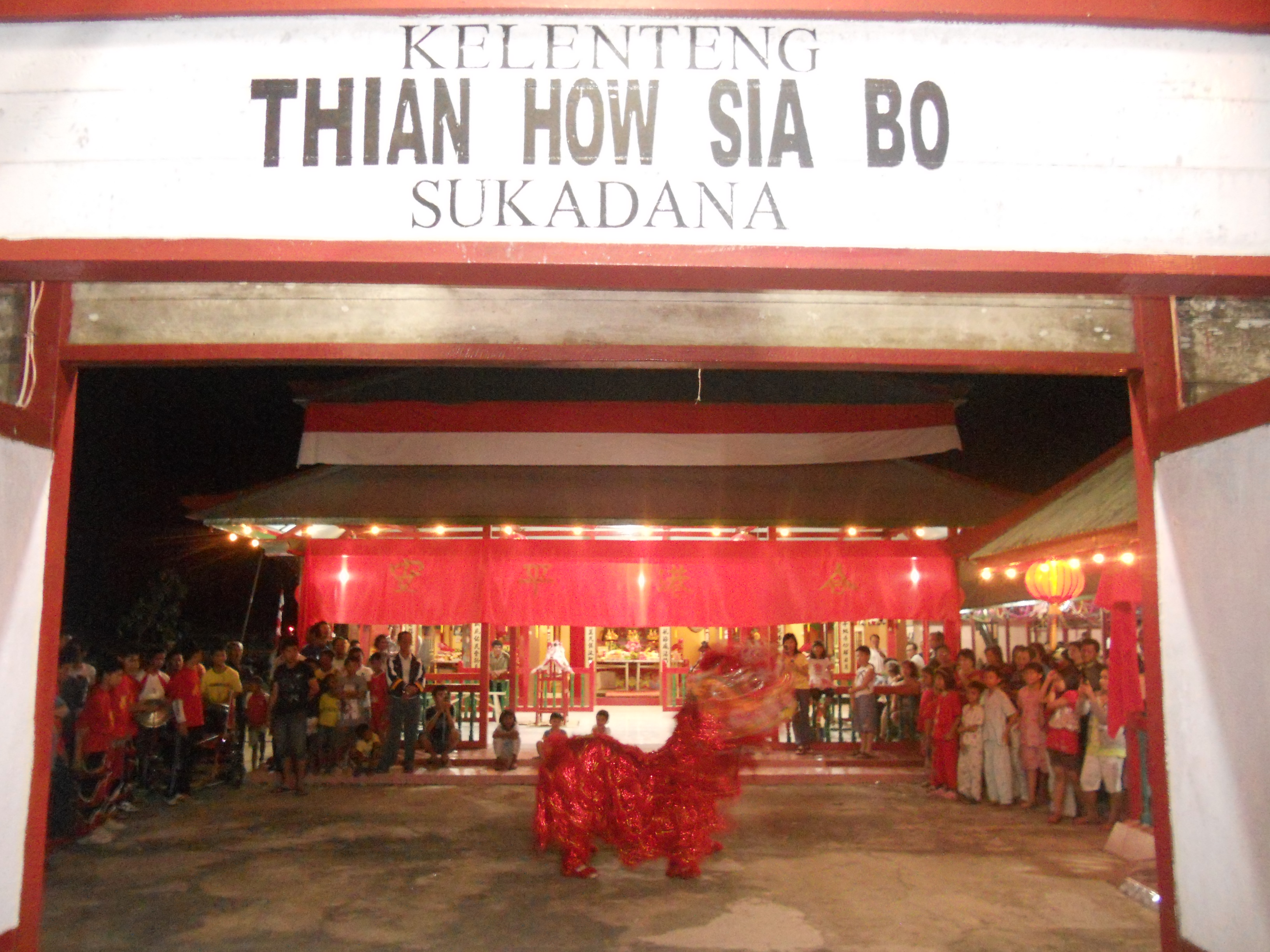
Chinese lion dance at Chinese temple

North Kayong has a minority population of Chinese with the majority being indigenous Malays. Most Chinese residents in North Kayong are of either Teochew or Hakka. The native Indonesians living there are mainly of Malay descent. In regards to speech, most citizens of North Kayong incorporate a type of Malay accent in their Indonesian, which is somewhat similar to that used in Malaysia.

Religion in Kayong Regency
1. Islam (95.0%)
2. Other religion (5.00%)

== Transportation ==
The nearest airport is Rahadi Osman at Ketapang. The airport has some connecting flights to Pontianak, Semarang via Pangkalan Bun, and Jakarta. Boats from Sukadana, Teluk Melano and Teluk Batang run daily to Pontianak.

== Places ==
- Gunung Palung National Park, a beautiful rainforest park that can be reached from Sukadana.
- Datok Island beach

== Hotels ==
The largest hotel is the Makhota Kayong in Sukadana.
