= Ketapang =

Ketapang Kute Ketapang (Ketapang Malay) Tau-pang (Ketapang Teochew) Kuta Ketapang (Pesaguan Dayak)
- Town

Other transcription(s)
  - Jawi: کتاڤڠ
  - Mandarin: 吉打邦 (Hanzi); Jí dǎ bāng (Pinyin)
  - Teochew: 头彭 (Simplified) 頭彭 (Traditional); Tao⁵ pang⁵ (Peng'im)
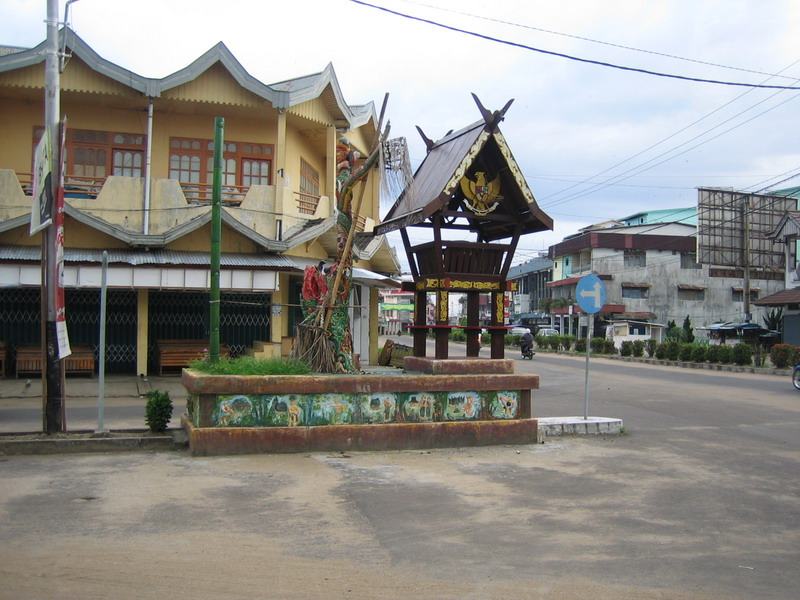
- Motto(s): Ketapang ASRI (Aman, Sehat, Ramah, Indah)
- Location within West Kalimantan

- Location in Kalimantan and Indonesia Ketapang (Indonesia)
- Coordinates: 1°51′S 109°59′E
- Province: West Kalimantan

Government
  - Regent: Alexander Wilyo

Area
  - Total: 74.0 km^{2} (28.6 sq mi)

Population (mid 2025 estimate)
  - Total: 93,662
  - Density: 1,270/km^{2} (3,280/sq mi)
- Time zone: UTC+7 (WIB)
- Website: http://www.ketapangkab.go.id/

Ketapang
- Chinese: 吉打邦
Transcriptions
Standard Mandarin
- Hanyu Pinyin: Jí dǎ bāng
Hakka
- Romanization: Kit-tá-pâng
Yue: Cantonese
- Jyutping: gat1 daa2 bong
Southern Min
- Hokkien POJ: Kiat-tá-pang
- Teochew Peng'im: Gêg⁴ da² bang¹

Tau-pang
- Traditional Chinese: 頭彭
- Simplified Chinese: 头彭
Transcriptions
Southern Min
- Teochew Peng'im: Tao⁵ pang⁵

Ketapang, or Tau-pang in Teochew, is the town and regency seat of Ketapang Regency (Kabupaten Ketapang), one of the regencies of West Kalimantan province on the island of Borneo in Indonesia. Ketapang town is located at 1°51′S 109°59′E and is a town on the delta of the Pawan River. Ketapang is served by the Rahadi Oesman Airport.

== History ==
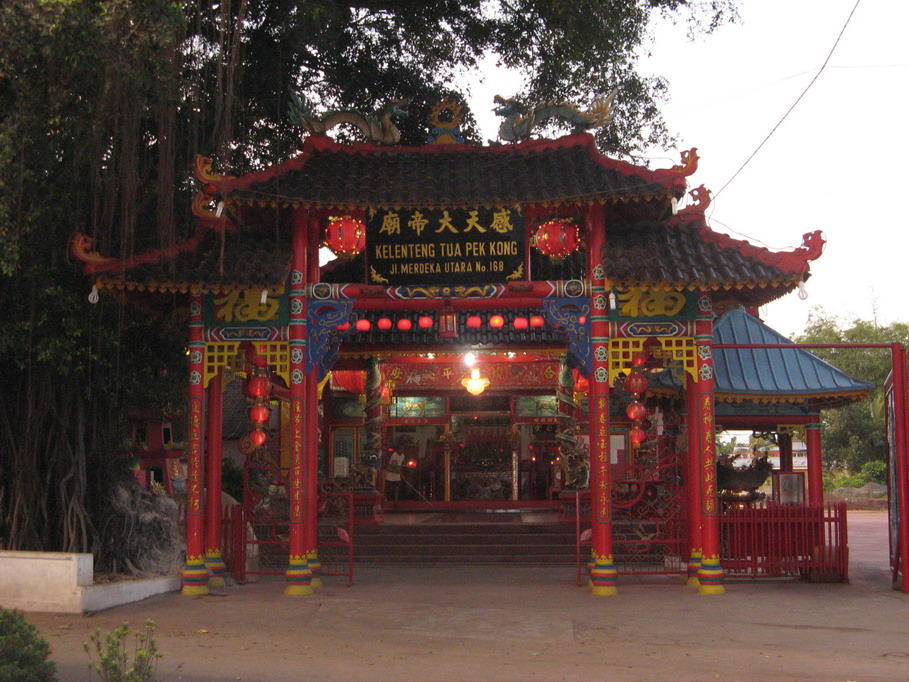
Tua Pek Kong Ketapang, icon of the town

Ketapang is named from the local Malay name for ketapang tree (Terminalia catappa).

In 1936, Ketapang Regency became one of the Afdeling (district in Dutch) in Keresidenan Kalimantan Barat (Residentis Western Afdeling van Borneo). In 1956, Ketapang Regency became an autonomous regency in West Kalimantan province, and led by a regent (bupati).

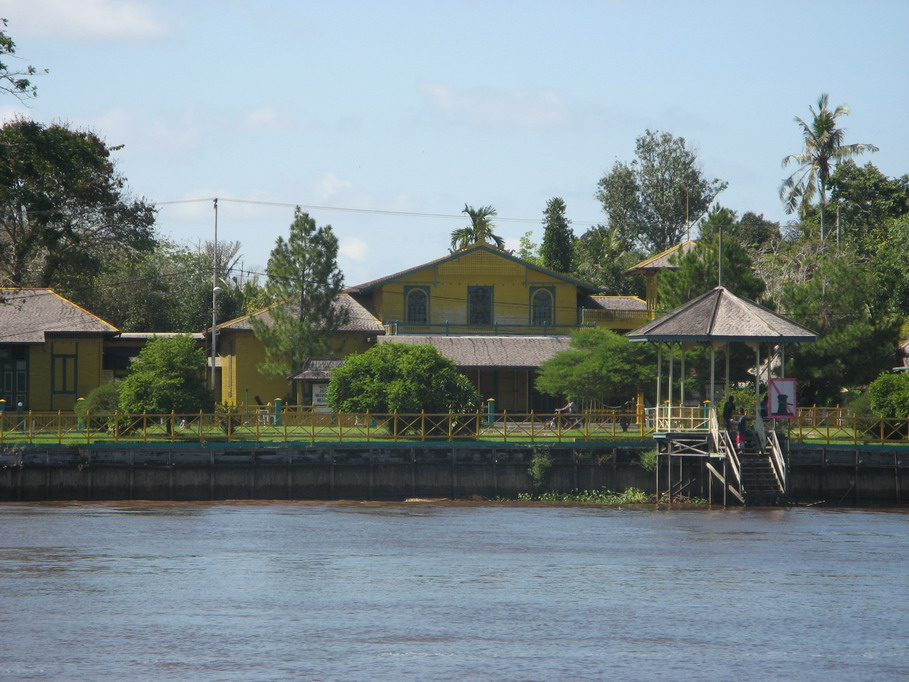
Keraton Matan (also known as Keraton G.M.Saunan, name of the last King) used to be a Malay's kingdom palace. It is now a museum

== Administration ==
In formal Indonesian administrative subdivision, Ketapang is a town district officially called Kecamatan Delta Pawan ("Pawan Estuary District"), not a city. The name of Ketapang is only officially applied to Ketapang Regency. Although there is no exact border of the built-up area, most of the government offices and the central of business of Ketapang Regency are located in Delta Pawan District (Kecamatan Delta Pawan) and because of that the district is considered as the capital of the regency. The district itself is located on the delta of the Pawan River. Benua Kayong District borders the town on its south side and forms part of the Ketapang urban area on the south side of the river (apart from the single inland village of Negeri Baru), while Muara Pawan District borders the town on its north side.

Delta Pawan District is sub-divided into five urban communities (kelurahan) and four rural villages (desa) - the desa being listed last in the table below - all listed below with their areas and populations as of mid 2025, together with their postcodes.

| Kode Wilayah | Name of kelurahan or desa | Area in km^{2} | Population mid 2025 estimate | Post code |
|---|---|---|---|---|
| 61.04.16.1001 | Kantor | 6.46 | 5,739 | 78811 |
| 61.04.16.1003 | Mulia Baru | 9.39 | 12,837 | 78813 |
| 61.04.16.1002 | Tengah | 7.08 | 7,074 | 78812 |
| 61.04.16.1004 | Sampit | 8.81 | 15,768 | 78813 |
| 61.04.16.1005 | Sukaharja | 23.08 | 18,596 | 78813 |
| 61.04.16.2007 | Kali Nilam | 7.63 | 13,905 | 78813 |
| 61.04.16.2006 | Sukabangun | 3.76 | 8,406 | 78813 |
| 61.04.16.2008 | Paya Kumang | 2.16 | 6,991 | 78813 |
| 61.04.16.2009 | Sukabangun Dalam | 5.63 | 4,346 | 78813 |
| 61.04.16 | Totals | 74.00 | 93,662 | |

== Economy ==
The main industries consists in the production of palm oil, rubber and wood. And also there are some mining like alumina, bauxite, zircon sand and lead (Batu Galena)

== Education ==
There are 37 high schools operated by state, private and religious institutions. The town has a polytechnic (Politeknik Ketapang, opened in 2008) and an Open University (Universitas Terbuka).

== Health ==
The three hospitals located in the town are RSUD Dr. Agoesdjam (public hospital), RS Fatima (private hospital), and RS Permata Bunda (private hospital).

== Demographics ==
Ketapang is a multicultural town. It has a large population of Chinese, Madurese and Javanese people. Most Chinese residents in Ketapang are of either Teochew or Hakka descent with Teochew being the majority. Because of this, Teochew is the main dialect used among Chinese residents in Ketapang. The native Indonesians living there are mainly of Malay and Dayak descent. In regards to speech, most citizens of Ketapang incorporate a type of Malay accent in their Indonesian, which is somewhat similar to that used in Malaysia.

== Transportation ==
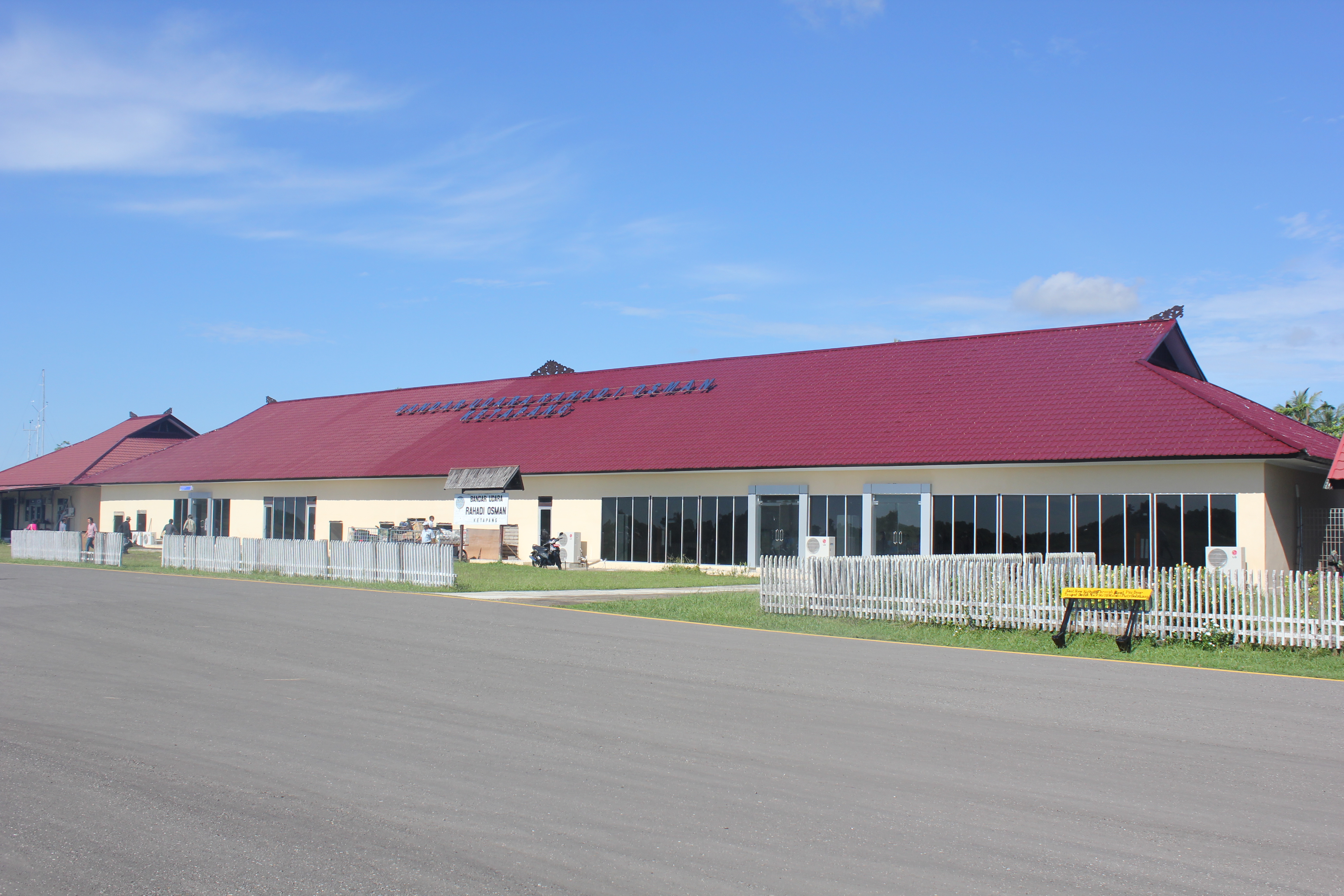
Rahadi Osman Airport, Ketapang, West Borneo, Indonesia

Ketapang is served by the Rahadi Oesman Airport. The airport has some connecting flights to Pontianak and Semarang via Pangkalan Bun. Since February 2011, Ketapang also has direct flight to Jakarta, by Aviastar. Aviastar stopped the service in 2018. Ketapang can also be reached via ship from Pontianak (a six-hour speedboat ride, departing Pontianak daily at 6 am). The ship also stopped the service in 2018. But there are some ship from Teluk Melano, 2 hours drive from Ketapang and home pick-up included, to Pontianak every day. Pontianak's airport serves flights to Jakarta. By 2024, it is possible to drive to Pontianak by car in about 9 hours and 30 minutes passing Trans-Kalimantan road.

== Main sights ==
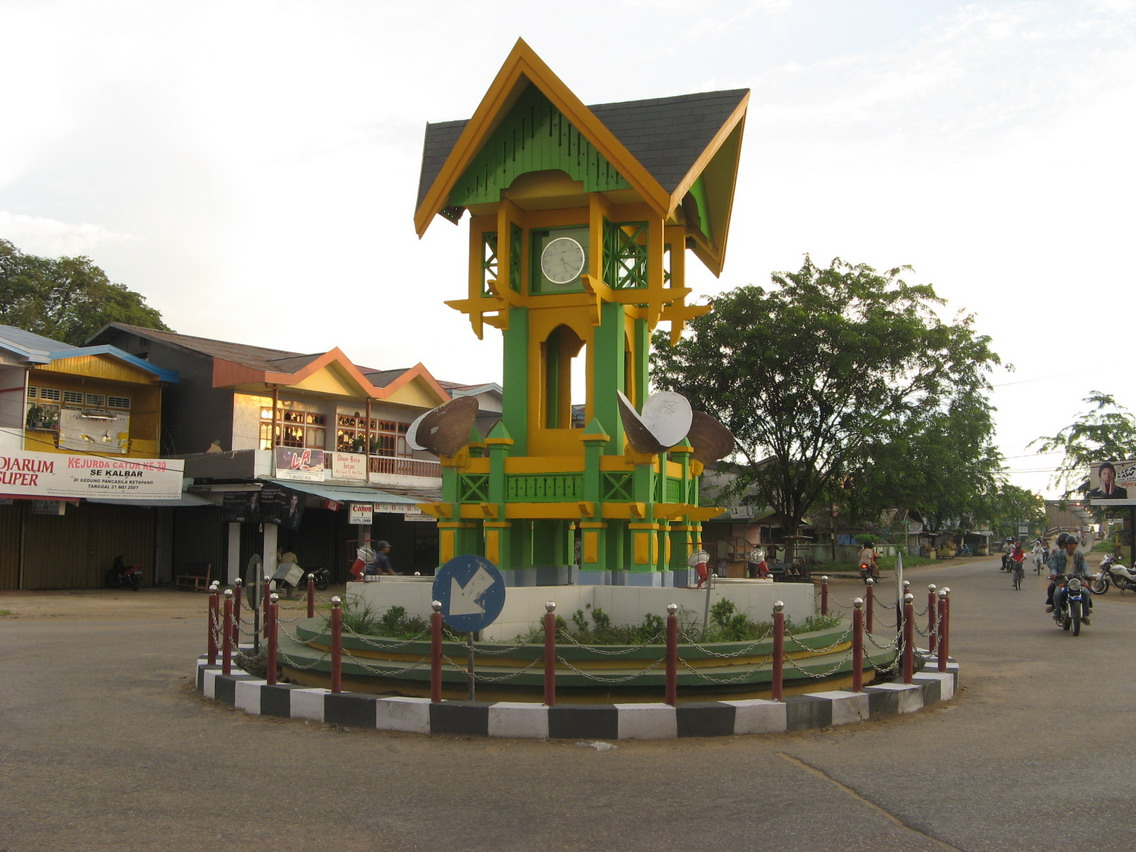
Tugu Ale-ale

- Gunung Palung National Park, a rainforest park that can be reached from Ketapang. It was once wholly part of Ketapang regency, but now only a small part is, the rest in the regency that is named Kayong Utara or North Kayong (created 2007). Kayong is the nickname of Ketapang.
- Pematang Gadung, The Peat Forest, the home of wild Orangutan.
- Kelenteng Tua Pek Kong (大伯公), a Chinese temple.
- Tugu Ale-ale. Ale-ale is a kind of shell.
- Beaches in Ketapang include Sungai Jawi beach (10 km from the town), Tanjung Batu beach (35 km), and Pulau Datok beach (80 km).
- Makam Raja-Raja Tanjungpura (Tanjungpura Royal Cemetery), 3 hour from Ketapang town, by motorcycle and small boat that carries motorcycle through a section of road that is flooded. The flooded section is being repaired in 2019.

== Notable people ==
- Daud Yordan, boxer.
- Hamzah Haz, a former Indonesian vice President, born in Ketapang.

== Villages ==
- Pematang Gadung

== Climate ==
Climate data for Ketapang (1991–2020 normals)
| Month | Jan | Feb | Mar | Apr | May | Jun | Jul | Aug | Sep | Oct | Nov | Dec | Year |
|---|---|---|---|---|---|---|---|---|---|---|---|---|---|
| Mean daily maximum °C (°F) | 31.2 (88.2) | 31.4 (88.5) | 31.8 (89.2) | 32.1 (89.8) | 32.8 (91.0) | 32.6 (90.7) | 32.2 (90.0) | 32.5 (90.5) | 32.3 (90.1) | 31.8 (89.2) | 31.6 (88.9) | 30.9 (87.6) | 31.9 (89.5) |
| Daily mean °C (°F) | 27.5 (81.5) | 27.6 (81.7) | 27.8 (82.0) | 27.8 (82.0) | 28.1 (82.6) | 27.8 (82.0) | 27.3 (81.1) | 27.3 (81.1) | 27.4 (81.3) | 27.2 (81.0) | 27.2 (81.0) | 27.2 (81.0) | 27.5 (81.5) |
| Mean daily minimum °C (°F) | 24.6 (76.3) | 24.4 (75.9) | 24.5 (76.1) | 24.4 (75.9) | 24.4 (75.9) | 24.1 (75.4) | 23.6 (74.5) | 23.5 (74.3) | 23.7 (74.7) | 24.0 (75.2) | 24.1 (75.4) | 24.3 (75.7) | 24.1 (75.4) |
| Average precipitation mm (inches) | 306.0 (12.05) | 218.7 (8.61) | 230.3 (9.07) | 246.0 (9.69) | 222.0 (8.74) | 188.6 (7.43) | 158.9 (6.26) | 118.9 (4.68) | 161.8 (6.37) | 265.7 (10.46) | 387.1 (15.24) | 442.9 (17.44) | 2,946.9 (116.04) |
| Average precipitation days | 15.2 | 11.8 | 13.6 | 12.7 | 13.2 | 8.5 | 9.1 | 6.7 | 8.8 | 14.8 | 18.3 | 20.4 | 153.1 |
Source: Starlings Roost Weather (precipitation 1981–2023)

== See also ==
- Teochew dialect, a common dialect of Chinese residents in Ketapang.
- Roman Catholic Diocese of Ketapang
