= Mount Palung National Park =

National park in Indonesia

- IUCN category II (national park)
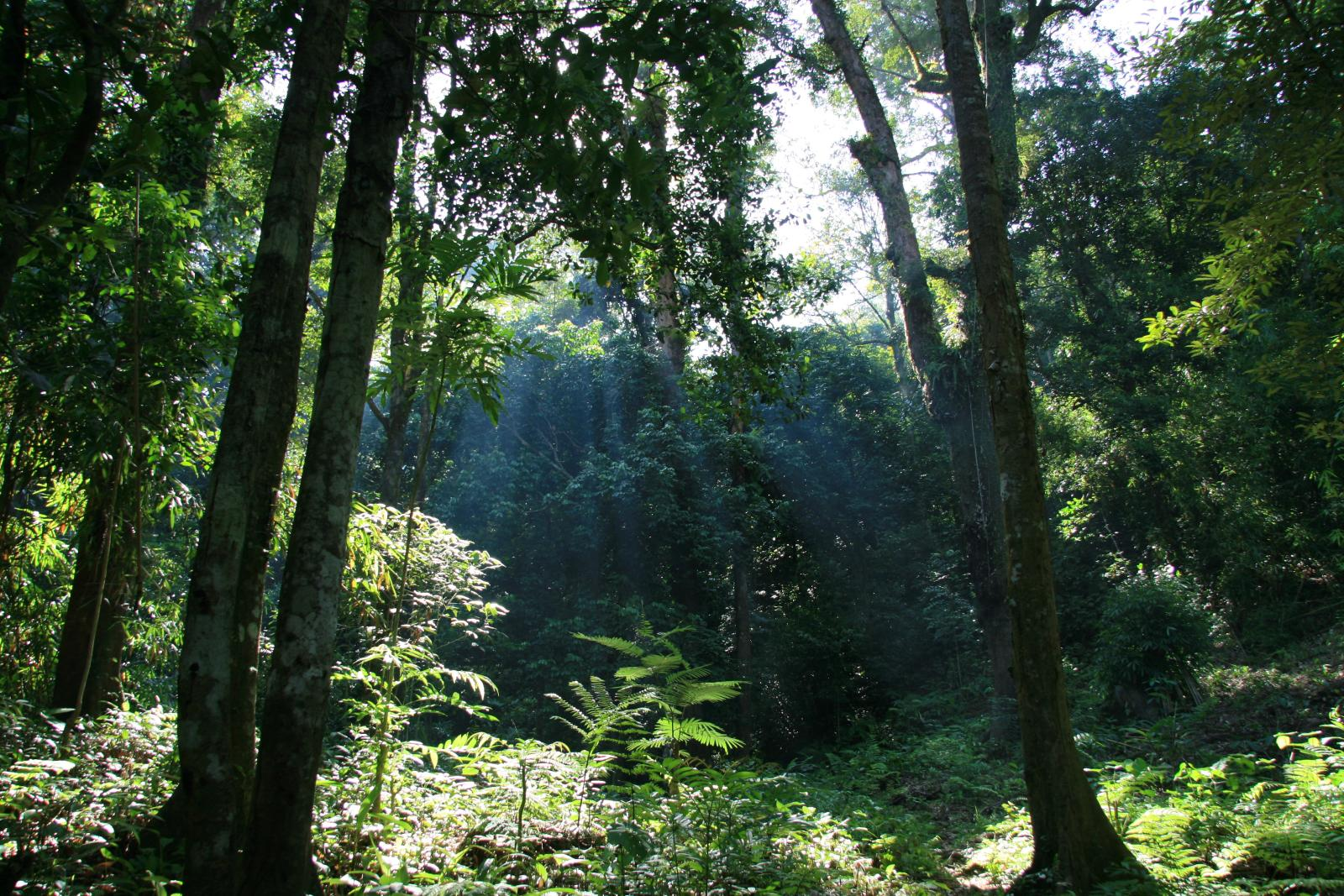
- Vegetation of Mount Palung

- Location within Borneo
- Location: West Kalimantan, Indonesia
- Nearest city: Pontianak
- Coordinates: 1°14′24″S 110°14′21″E
- Area: 900 km^{2} (350 sq mi)
- Established: 1990
- Governing body: Ministry of Forestry

Mount Palung National Park (Indonesian: Taman Nasional Gunung Palung) lies on the island of Borneo, in the Indonesian province of West Kalimantan, north of Ketapang and east of Sukadana.

== History ==
Mount Palung was first protected in 1937 as a forest nature reserve covering 300 km^{2} (120 sq mi). In 1981, the size was increased to 900 km^{2} (350 sq mi) and its status raised to a wildlife reserve, and on 24 March 1990 the area became a national park.

== Geography ==
The park is notable for its diversity of habitat types, ranging from mangrove and freshwater swamp forest, to lowland alluvial (empran bench) forest, to montane forest, and for its diversity of wildlife. It is one of only a handful of parks in the world where orangutans can be seen in the wild.

A research station (Cabang Panti) was established at the western foot of the main Mount Palung mountains in 1985, and is owned and operated by the park management authority. Research there has contributed significantly to our understanding of Borneo forest biology.

Illegal, non-mechanized, 'hand logging' has been a problem in the park, especially from ca. 2000–2003. Initiatives by park authorities and NGOs (increased policing, monitoring by microlight, educational activities) contributed to a reduction of illegal activities, however, illegal logging continues at several hot-spots. In 2007, Alam Sehat Lestari (ASRI) clinic was established to provide affordable health care and alternative livelihood training for villagers living around the park. This intervention has greatly reduced illegal logging throughout Mount Palung as locals with reliable health care access and more economic opportunities are less likely to rely on income from illegal timber. The park was one of the key sites of the EU-funded Illegal Logging Response Center (ILRC, now continued in FLEGT).

== Research ==
In 1985 Dr. Mark Leighton, Rhys Bowen, Lisa Curran, Manuel Lerdau, and Todd Truesdale established the Cabang Panti Research Camp deep within the National Park. The site encompasses over 2,100 hectares networked by over 25 km of well-marked trails extending throughout all seven forest types including the upper montane forest.

Following a short period of non-occupation from 2004 to 2007, Cabang Panti Research Station was rebuilt in 2007 with money provided by two research teams from the United States. Projects led by Dr. Andrew Marshall of the University of California, Davis and Dr. Cheryl Knott of Boston University funded the reconstruction. The current facilities include a main two-story wooden building complete with six private rooms, three office areas, a kitchen, living area and a mezzanine. Three out-buildings include one five-room bunkhouse for local research assistants, and two one-room houses for Principal Investigators. These buildings were donated to Mount Palung National Park in 2011.

Cabang Panti is currently home to a number of researchers including two long-term interests: the Mount Palung Orangutan Project, and the Gibbon and Leaf-Monkey Project.

In September 2011, all researchers were expelled from Cabang Panti by the local Park Office after an NGO sent a letter to Jakarta detailing encroachment by illegal logging into the research site. The park justified the reaction by saying they needed all four buildings to house the rotating 4-6 person teams of forest police. After an appeal to Jakarta, researchers were allowed back into the area, however were not granted access to the buildings.

== Orangutan conservation ==
The orangutan is considered the umbrella species for conservation in the National Park, and is also an important ecological agent for seed dispersal and seed predation. It is believed that orangutans at Mount Palung constitute one of the most dense and largest populations on Borneo. A census conducted in 2001, part-funded by The Orangutan Conservancy, gives an estimate of 2500 individual orangutans, about 4.5% of the estimated population in Borneo and close to 4% of the world's population.

The Mount Palung Orangutan Project was established in 1994 by Dr. Cheryl Knott. This project integrates scientific research about orangutan biology and ecology with conservation programs aimed at the preservation of this endangered species and its habitat. Cheryl Knott is conducting scientific investigation of the factors governing orangutan reproduction and population viability, increasing awareness on the local level to encourage support for conservation of the park and community education around the park and capacity-building for National Park Office staff.

Illegal logging, in conjunction with fires raging across the Indonesian rain forests, make immediate conservation action in this area of paramount importance. The Mount Palung Orangutan Conservation Program was initiated to address the threat to orangutans and their habitat.

== Tourism ==
The park has potential for ecotourism, and has a number of attractive sites for visitors. The only way to gain permission to enter the park is by paying for a package offered by Nasalis Tour and Travel or one of its partners. Nasalis is a for-profit corporation owned and operated by local National Park staff and administrators. As of August 2011, the park had not approved any other tourism companies to operate within the park boundaries.

== See also ==
- Geography of Indonesia
