= Bantimurung–Bulusaraung National Park =

National park in Indonesia

Bantimurung-Bulusaraung National Park
- Taman Nasional Bantimurung-Bulusaraung
- IUCN category II (national park)
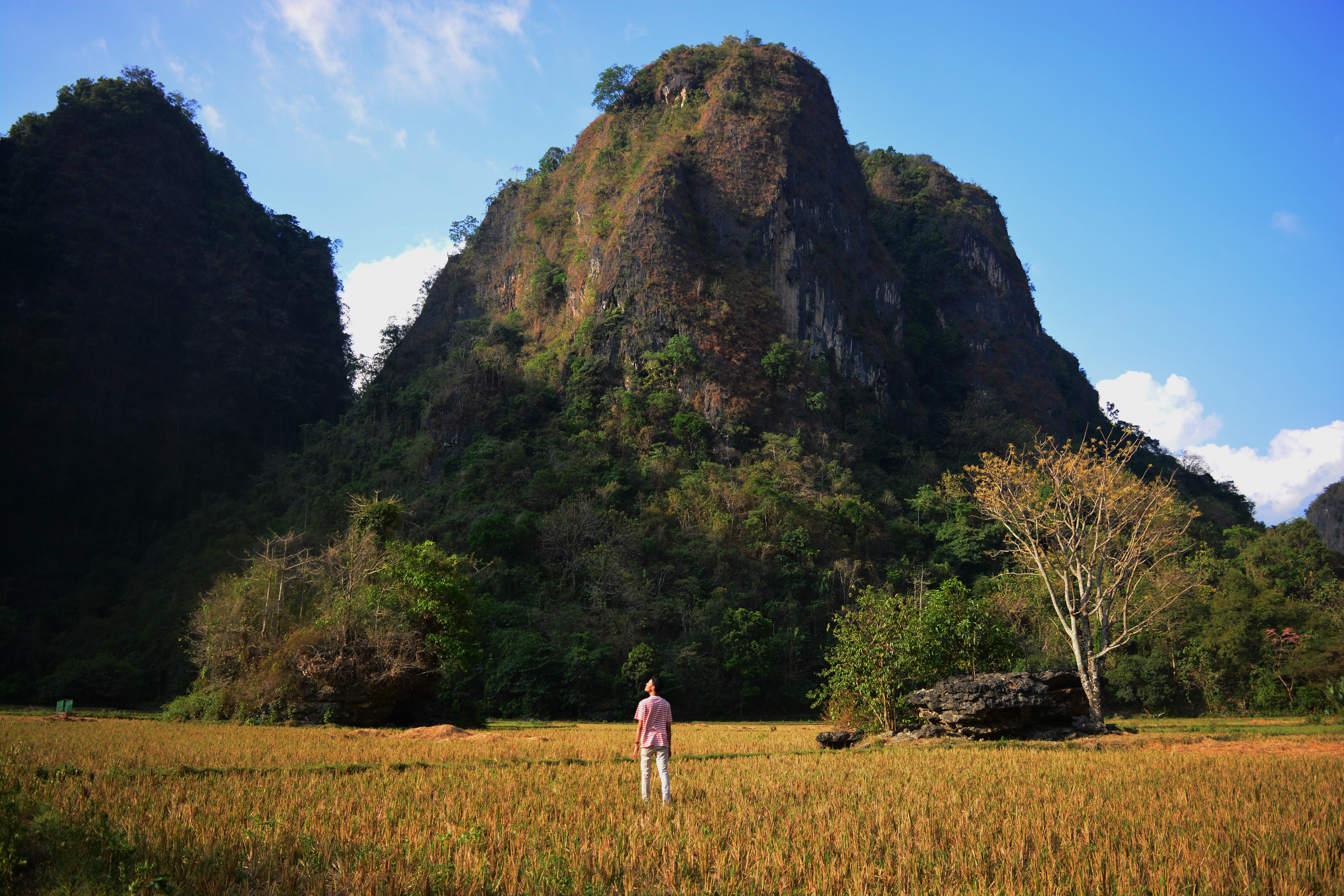
- Rammang-rammang karst in Bantimurung-Bulusaraung NP

- Location within Sulawesi
- Interactive map of Bantimurung-Bulusaraung; National Park
- Location: South Sulawesi, Indonesia
- Nearest city: Makassar
- Coordinates: 4°54′S 119°45′E
- Area: 437 square kilometres (43,700 ha)
- Established: 2004
- Governing body: Ministry of Environment and Forestry
- Website: www.tn-babul.org

Bantimurung-Bulusaraung National Park (Indonesian: Taman Nasional Bantimurung-Bulusaraung) is a national park in South Sulawesi in Indonesia. The park contains the Rammang-Rammang karst area, the second largest karst area known in the world after the one in South-Eastern China.

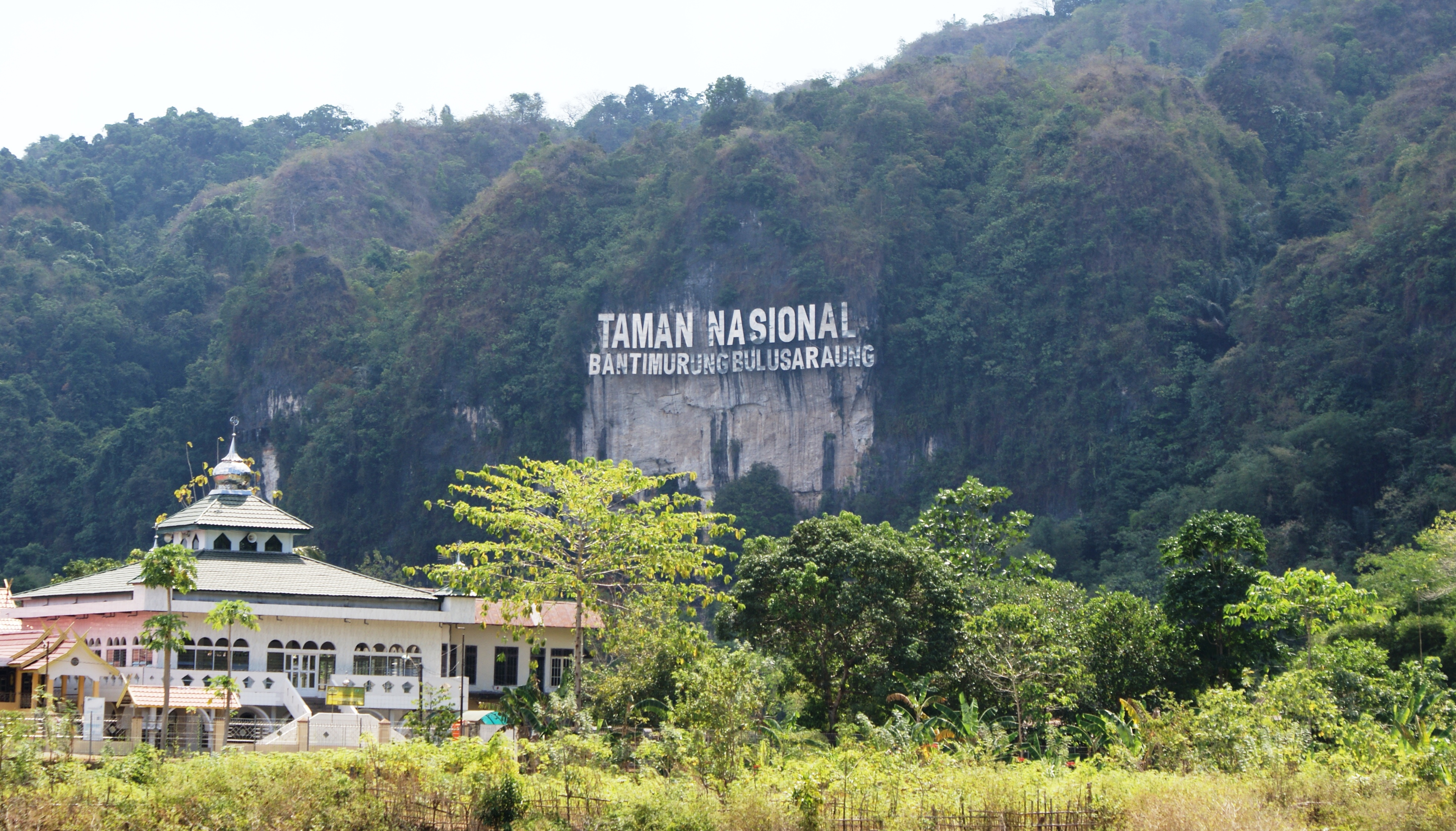
Bantimurung-Bulusauraung National Park, South Sulawesi, Indonesia.

The park is in Maros Regency, 50 kilometers to the north of Makassar (one hour drive) or just 20 kilometers from Sultan Hasanuddin International Airport (30 minutes drive). Most of the Karst formations are tall and steep at almost a 90-degree angle line along both sides of the road from Maros city to Bantimurung continuing up to the Pangkajene and Islands Regency (Indonesian: Pangkajene dan Kepulauan, commonly abbreviated as Pangkep).

The karst area is 43,750 hectares and has 286 caves which include 16 pre-historic caves in Maros and 17 pre-historic caves in Pangkep. There is a waterfall with 2 caves at the national park; the one on the left side is known as the dream cave (one-kilometer long) and the one on the right is known as the stone cave. Riding on the water on blown up inner tubes is a popular activity for children at the site.

== History ==
The first main exploration of the Bantimurung area was carried out by Alfred Wallace in July–October 1857. Later he published the results of his explorations in The Malay Archipelago which encouraged numerous researchers to visit Maros. Then, in 1970–1980, there were five chosen conservation areas in Maros-Pangkep Karst, consisting of two nature parks (Bantimurung and Gua Pattunuang) and three wildlife sanctuaries (Bantimurung, Karaenta, and Bulusaurung). In 1993, The XI International Union of Speleology Congress recommended Maros-Pangkep Karst as a world heritage site. Five years after that, the Environmental Seminar of Hasanuddin University (PSL-UNHAS) also recommended protection of Maros-Pangkep Karst.

Furthermore, in May 2001, International Union for Conservation of Nature (IUCN) Asia Regional Office and UNESCO World Heritage Center held the Asia-Pacific Forum on Karst Ecosystems and World Heritage in Sarawak, Malaysia which convinced the Indonesian government to conserve Maros-Pangkep Karst. Finally in 2004, the Ministry of Forestry declared the allocation of 43,750 hectares of Bantimurung-Bulusaurung land for wildlife conservatory, nature park, conservation forest, limited production forest, production forest, as the Bantimurung – Bulusaraung National Park.

In January 2026, an ATR 42 operated by Indonesia Air Transport carrying 10 people crashed into Mount Bulusaraung, located inside the park. At least one body was discovered at the site.

== Fauna ==
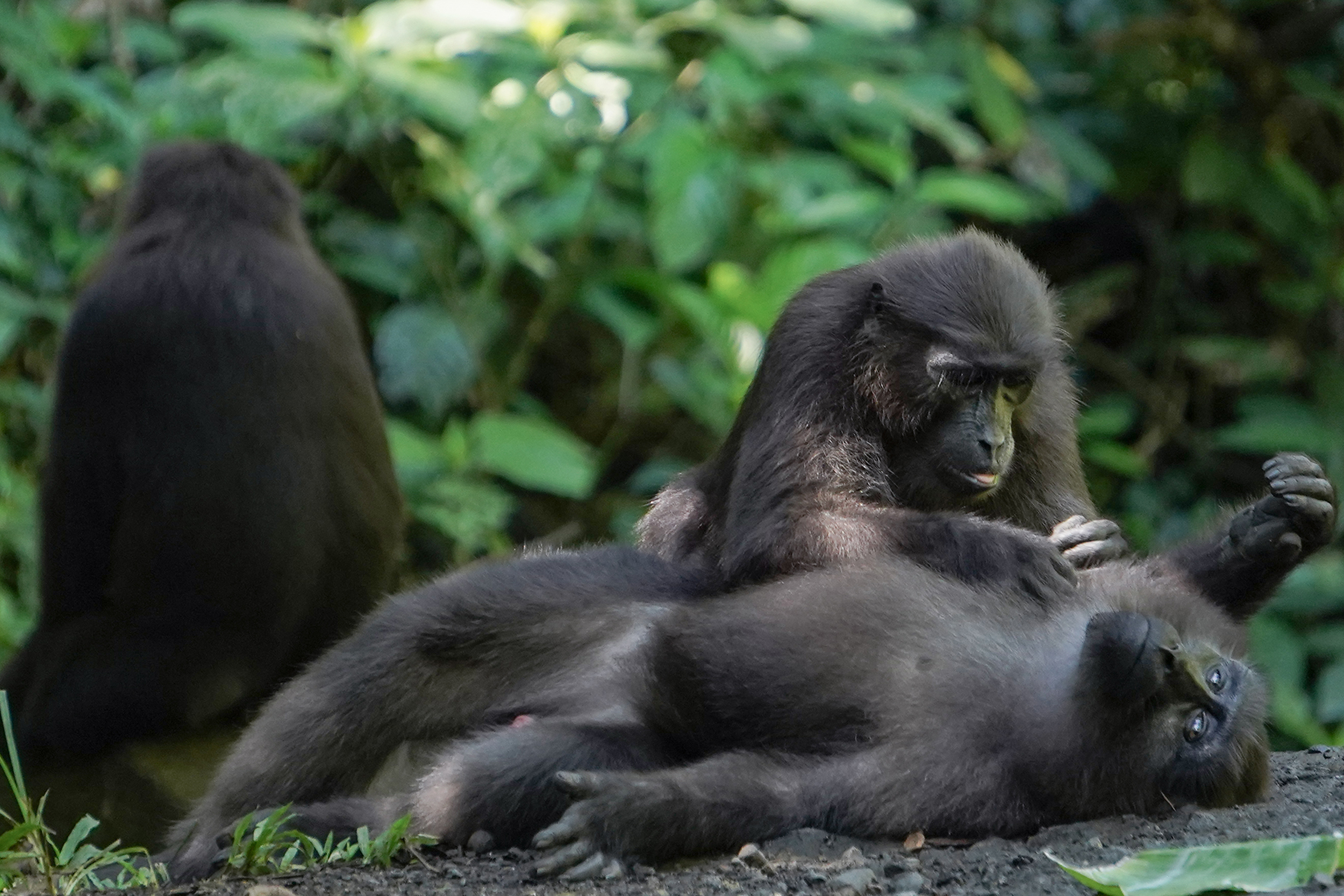
Grooming among moor macaques in their natural habitat at Bantimurung–Bulusaraung National Park.

Located in the transition area of Asia and Australia zone, the national park has many unique animals collection, such as Sulawesi moor macaque (Macaca maura), the red-knobbed hornbill (Aceros cassidix, Penelopides exarhatus), cuscus (Strigocuscus celebensis), Sulawesi palm civet (Macrogalidia musschenbroekii), bat, and pot-bellied boar (Sus scrofa vittatus). Recently, in March 2008, staffs of Bantimurung – Bulusaraung National Park had documented the existence of Tarsius fuscus and they also found its nest inside the area. Among crustacean biodiversity in the karst area, there is one unique species called "spider crab" (Cancrocaeca xenomorpha) which is only found in Maros Karst cave.

== Butterflies ==
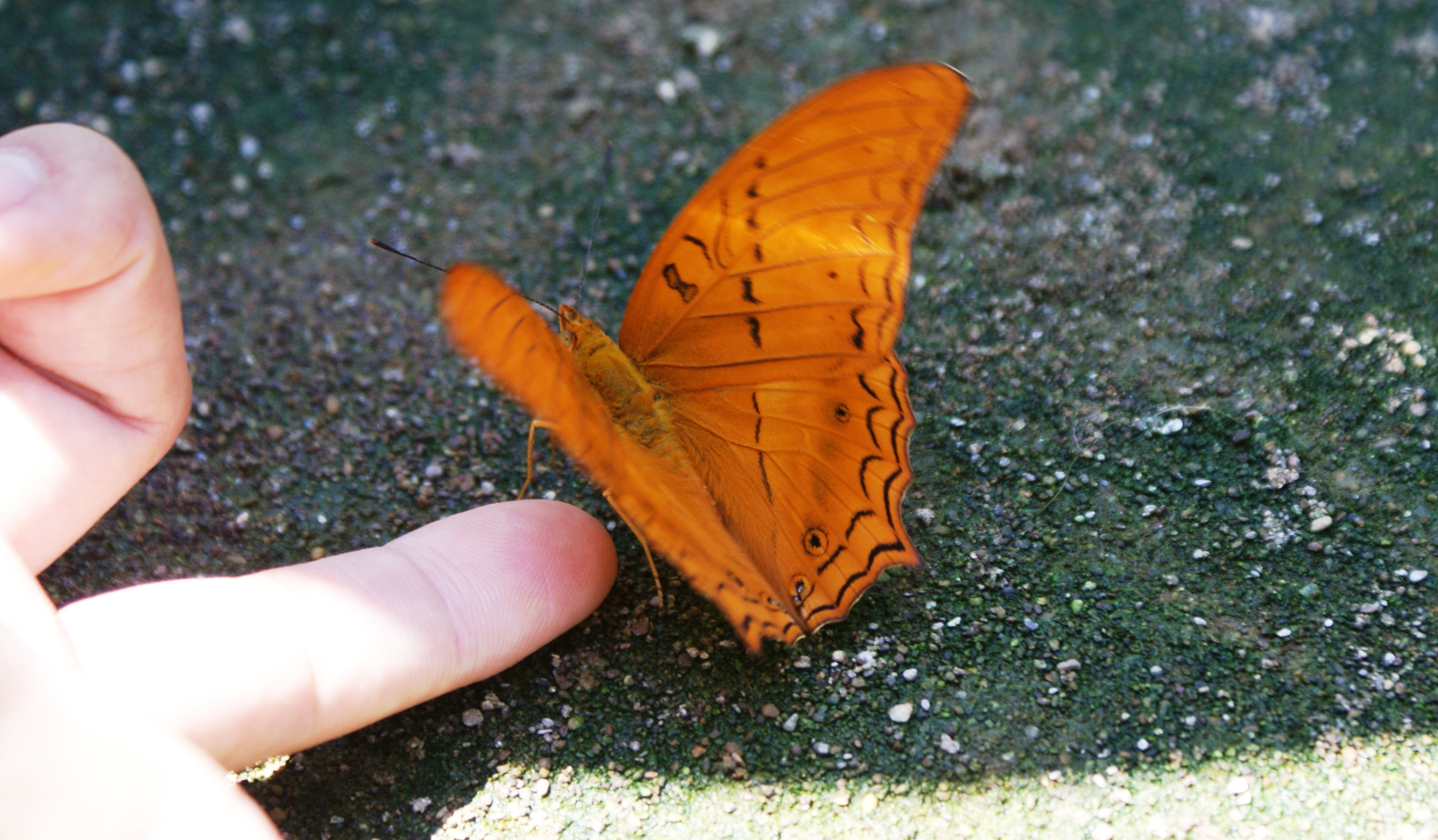
Butterfly (Vindula sp.) in Bulusaurung Conservatory

Besides insectarium, butterfly breeding centers, managed by both the reserve administrator and residents serve complete the metamorphosis process of the butterflies. There are many butterflies around the waterfall such as Troides helena Linne, Troides hypolitus Cramer, Troides haliphron Boisduval, Papilio peranthus adamantius and Cethosia myrana. The British naturalist Alfred Russel Wallace referred to the site as a butterfly kingdom. During his exploration in 1857, Wallace found 256 butterfly species from Bantimurung area, different from previous report of Mattimu in 1977 who found 103 butterfly species inside the national park with some endemic species are Papilio blumei, Papilio polytes, Papilio sataspes, and Graphium androcles.

Since the 1970s the Bantimurung area has been known as a commercial source of butterflies. Collections of butterflies are supplied both to local Indonesian markets as well as international markets as souvenirs in the form of individual specimens, butterfly frames, key chains, and other accessories. In 2010 about 600,000 tourists (mainly domestic visitors) visited the site. Over use and over exploitation of the local resource is now seen as a problem. In response, the management of the national park has moved to change the purpose of the butterfly conservatory from extraction and exploitation into preservation of the natural ecosystem as a tourist attraction. However, local informal trade in butterflies still occurs. Sellers still catch butterflies in the park and sell them to local dealers rather than producing them from breeding or farming production. As an attempt to help preserve the butterflies, a wide variety were listed as a priority in the insect group of the official Indonesian Government's National Species Conservation Strategic Directions 2008–2018.

== Gallery ==
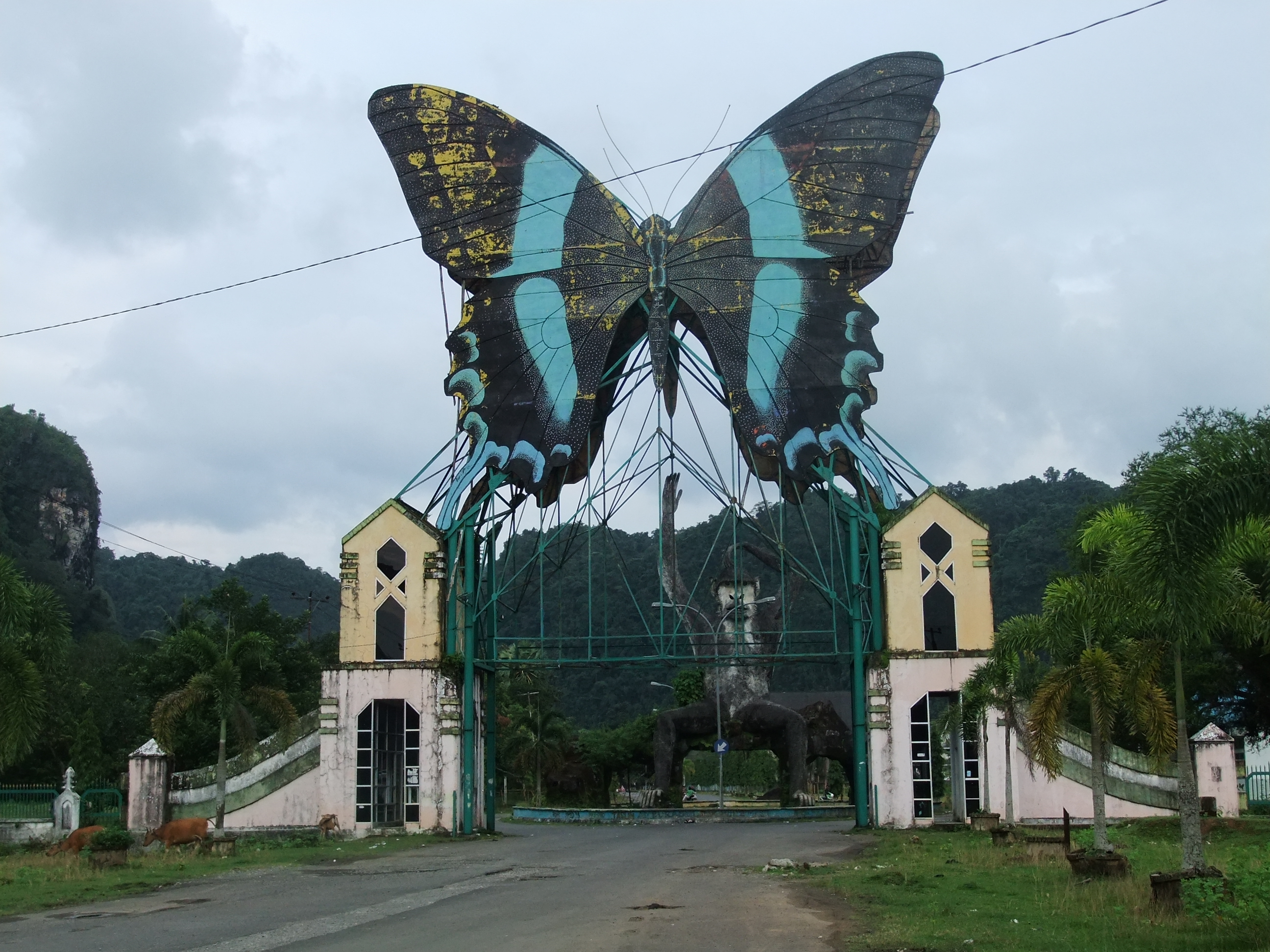
Gate to Bantimurung Waterfall

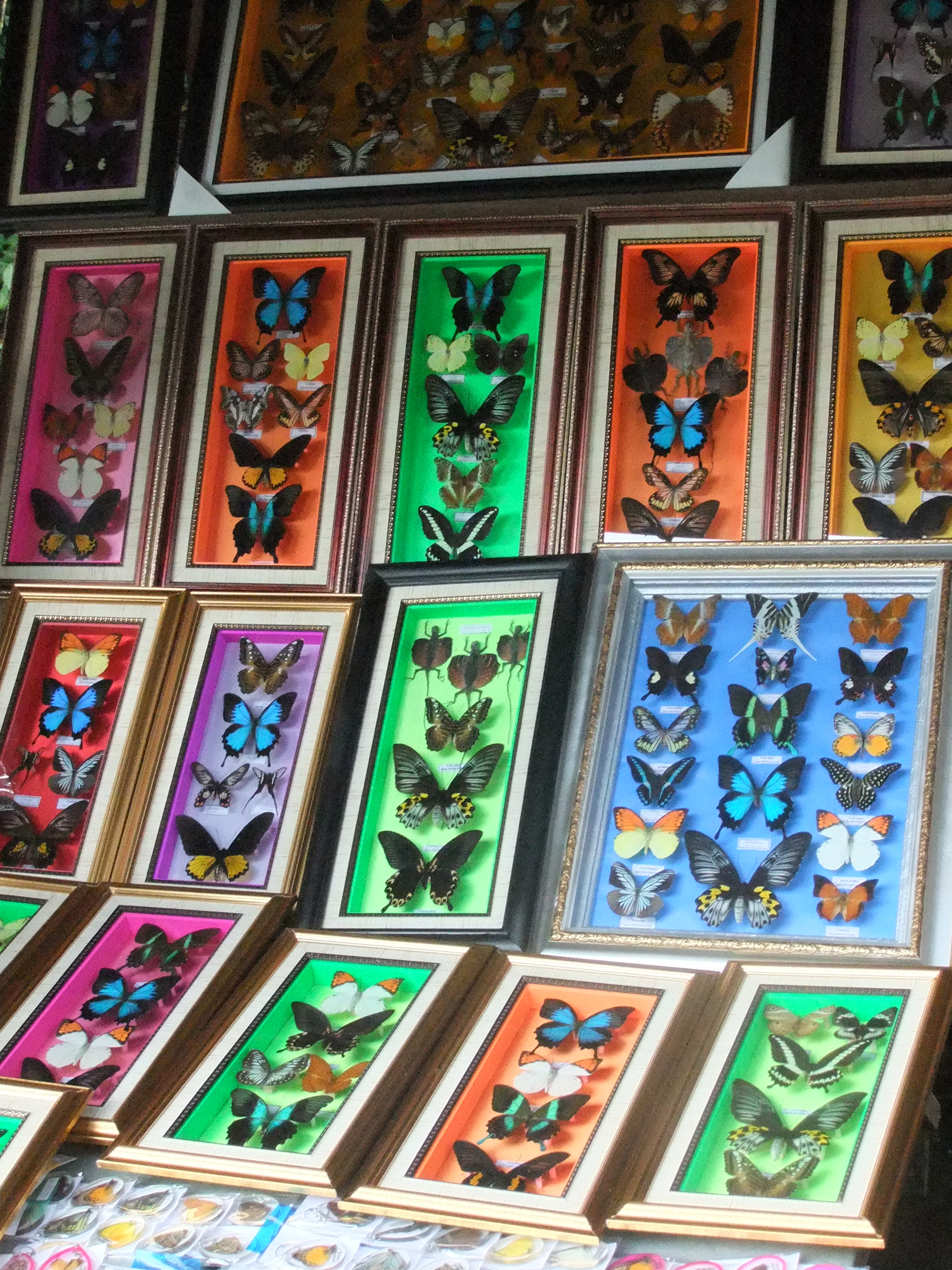
Butterfly specimens for sale, at Bantimurung-Bulusaraung National Park

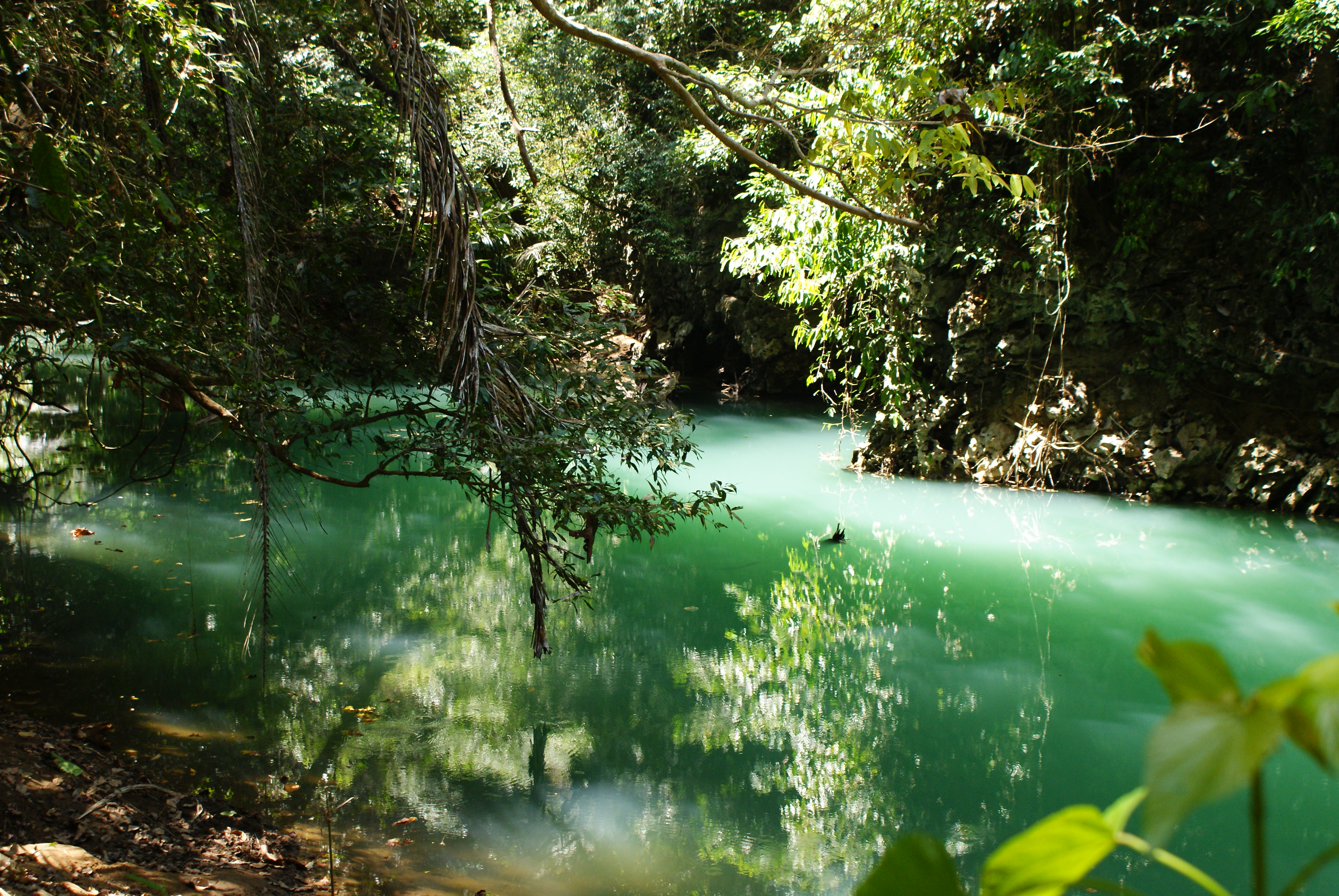
Green river at the national park

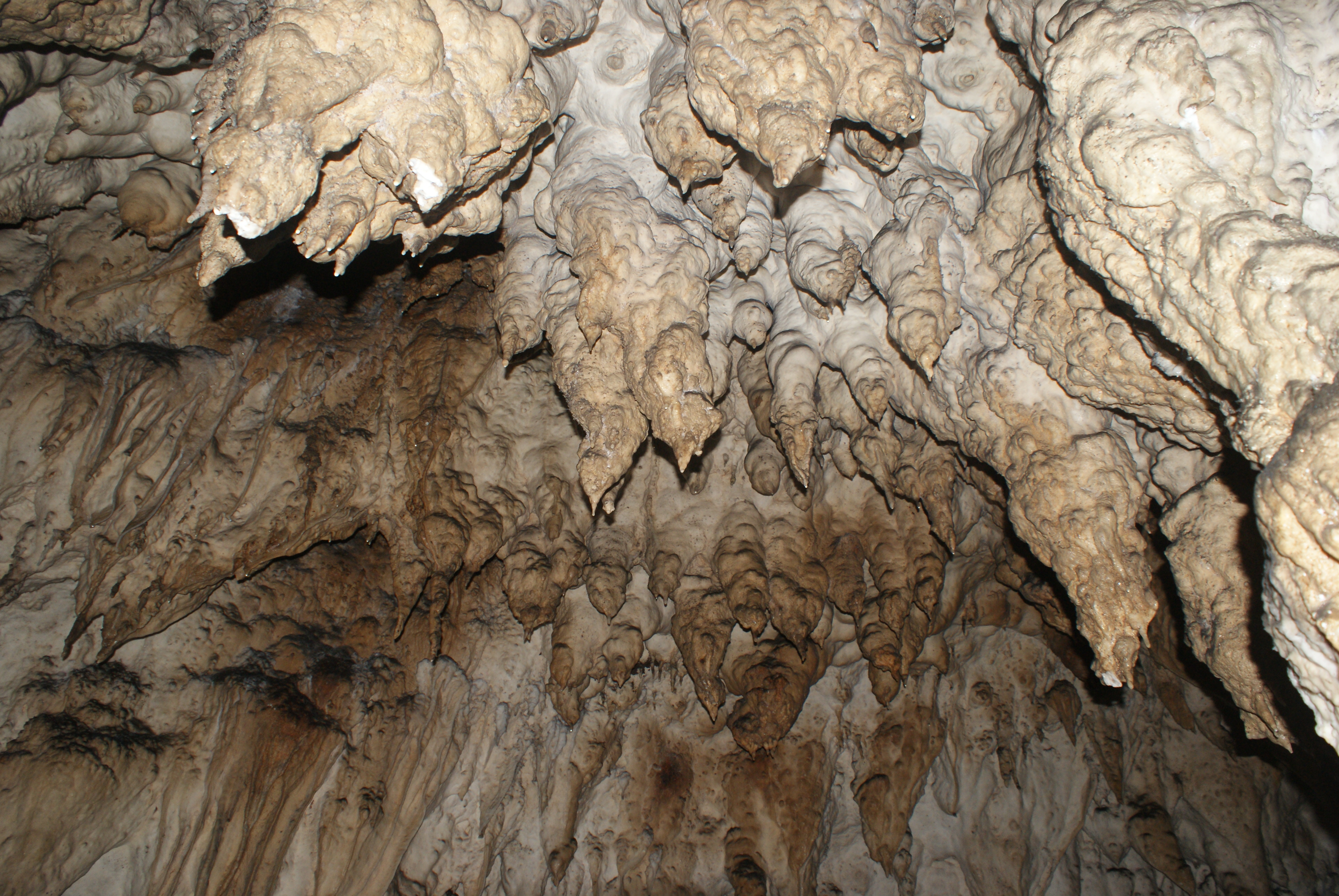
Stalactites and stalagmites inside Bantimurung Cave

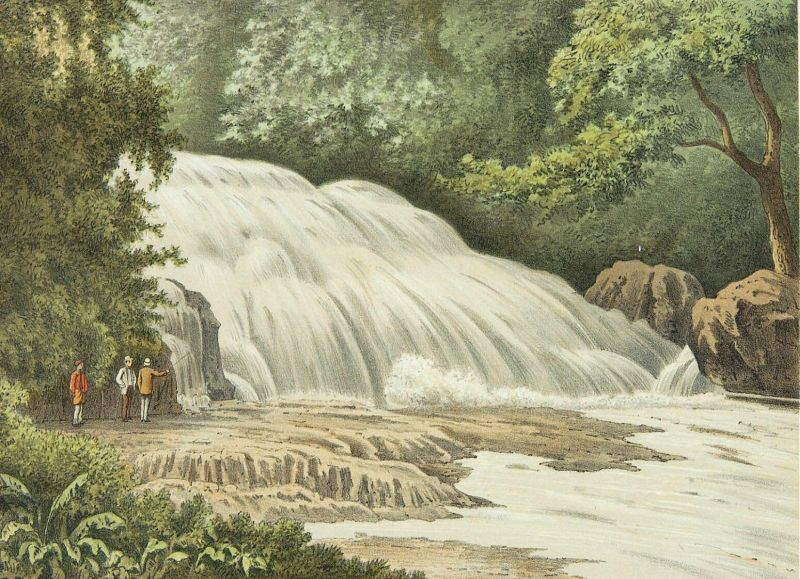
Lithograph of Bantimurung Waterfall in 1883–1889 based on Josias Cornelis Rappard painting

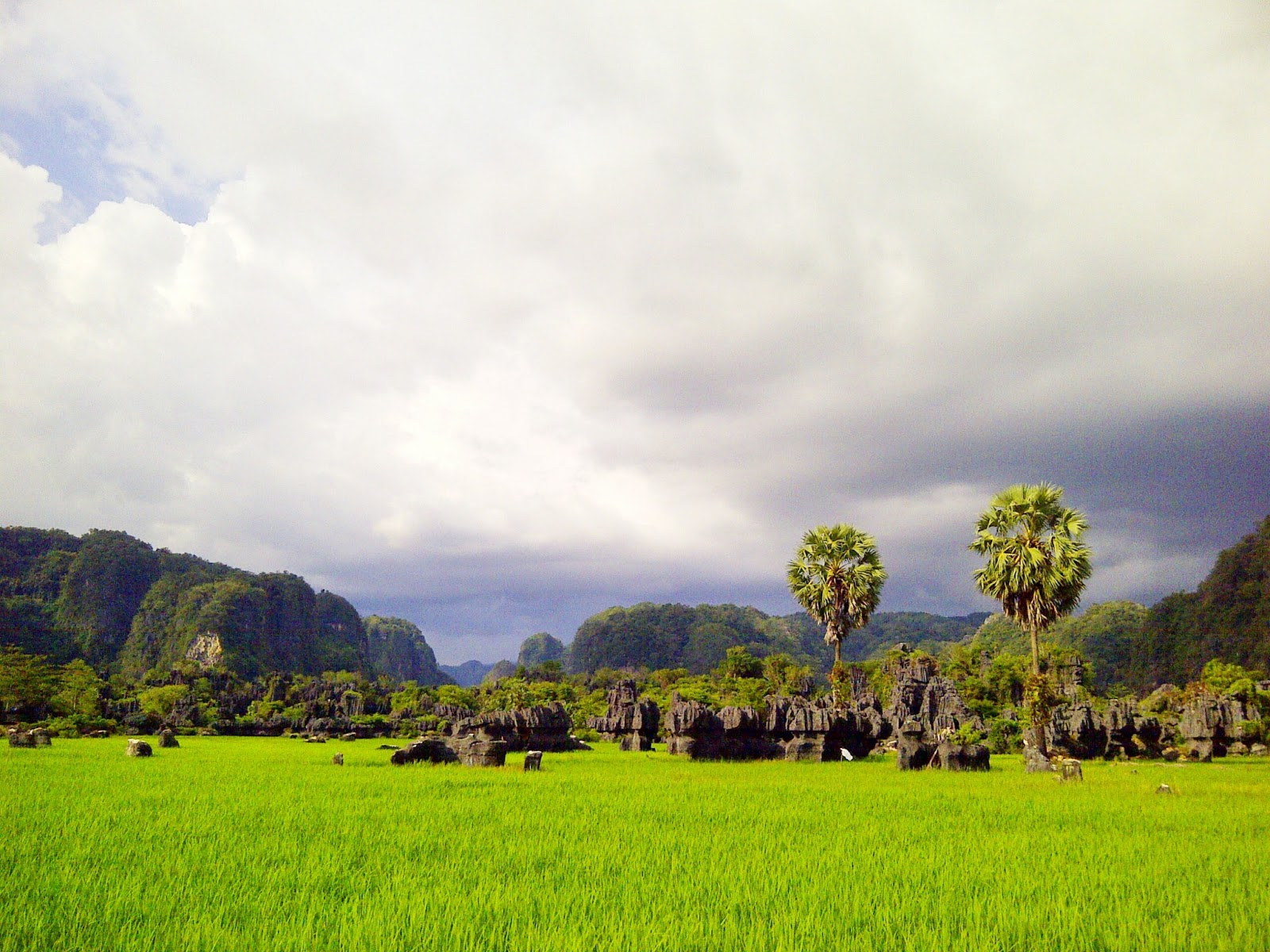
Karst landscape at Rammang-Rammang
