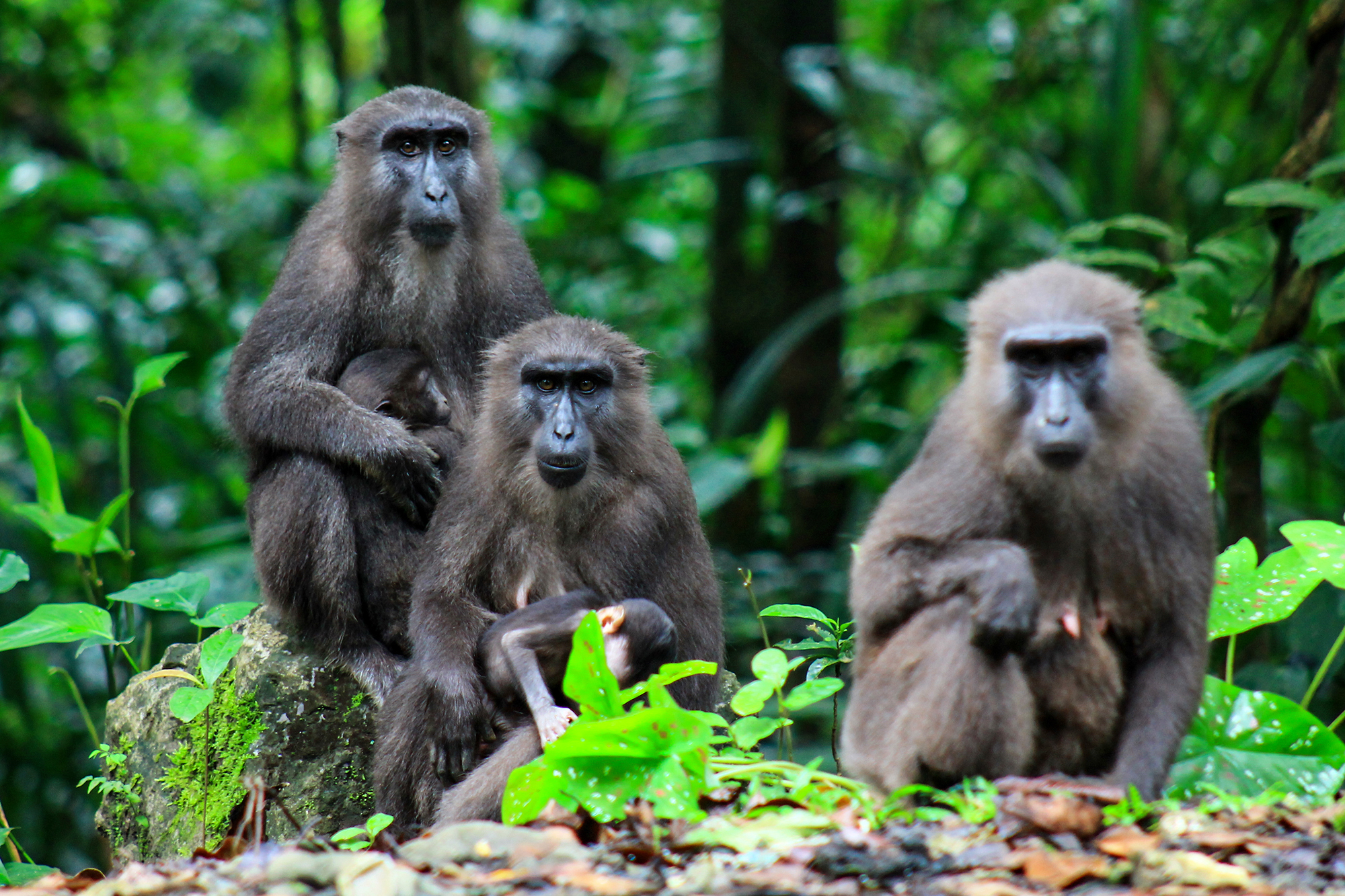

Conservation status
- Endangered (IUCN 3.1)

Scientific classification
- Kingdom: Animalia
- Phylum: Chordata
- Class: Mammalia
- Infraclass: Placentalia
- Order: Primates
- Family: Cercopithecidae
- Genus: Macaca
- Species: M. maura

Binomial name
- Macaca maura (Schinz, 1825)
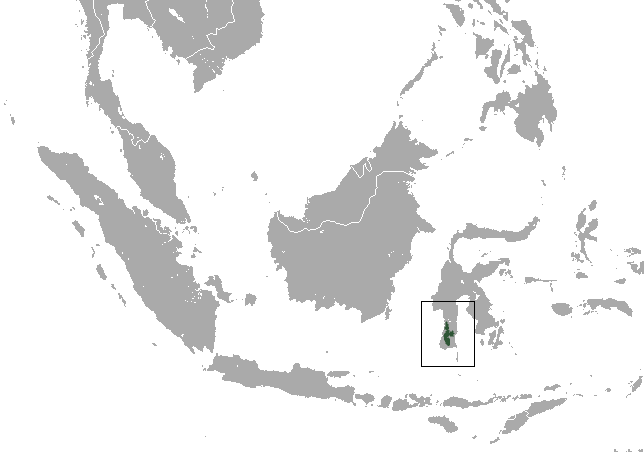
- Moor macaque range

= Moor macaque =

Species of Old World monkey

The Moor macaque (Macaca maura) is a macaque species with brown/black body fur with a pale rump patch and pink bare skin on the rump. It has ischial callosities, which are oval-shaped. It is about 50–58.5 cm long, and eats figs, bamboo seeds, buds, sprouts, invertebrates and cereals in tropical rainforests. It is sometimes called "dog-ape" because of its dog-like muzzle, although it is no more closely related to apes than any other Old World monkey is. It is endemic to the island of Sulawesi in Indonesia, which is an important biodiversity hotspot.

The Moor macaque is threatened mostly due to habitat loss from an expanding human population and deforestation to increase agricultural land area. The Macaca maura population is estimated to have decreased from 56,000 in 1983 to under 10,000 in 1994. In 1992, Supriatna et al. 1992 conducted an extensive survey and found 6.3–63.2 individuals/km^{2.} They usually live in groups of 15-40 individuals, with female philopatry and male dispersal and they are diurnal and semi-terrestrial. They spend a lot of their time in trees foraging and on the ground travelling.

According to the Behavioural Data collection done on 2 groups of Moor macaques in the Bantimurung Bulusaraung National Park in South Sulawesi, this species spends most of their time feeding in places where food resources are abundant. The results also show that Moor macaques tend to spend more time foraging as the group size increases as they spend less time in alertness.

The population of this species is highly endangered due to serious anthropogenic activities like agriculture and tourism, which contribute to its habitat loss. Like many other frugivorous primates, Moor macaques have made significant contributions to the environment, helping to support high densities of seedlings and saplings as well as the process of gene flow among plant populations. This is crucial for sustaining forest regeneration and restoring vegetation in degraded forests.

This species has been on the IUCN Red list of threatened species (A2cd) since 2015.

== Taxonomy ==
The Moor macaque made its first appearance in western science through the work of Heinrich Rudolf Schinz in 1825.

== Distribution and habitat ==
The Indonesian island of Sulawesi hosts 7 species of macaques with one of them being the Moor macaque. Unfortunately, the Moor macaque is endemic to the island and is considered to be endangered by the IUCN Red List of Threatened Species. The Moor macaque is the only species of macaques that existed naturally in South Sulawesi. Moor macaques have significant ecological flexibility that enables them to use several forest strata, including secondary habitats. They have a different ecological environment compared to other nonhuman primates since they have no major predators or competitors except where their ranges overlap. The home range of the Moor macaque group is usually 20-30 ha wide, with a total distance of roughly 6.64 km.

They can be found in lowland forests, grasslands, limestone areas and even near human habitations, and they are commonly found with the endemic Malkoha birds that feed on grasshoppers, which are pushed out of the canopy by the macaques' movements.

Those living near humans have been observed to be more present in areas where domestic animals are found, as these areas do not have a lot of traps that endanger them. They are predominantly found in the karst forest ecosystem of South Sulawesi. The karst plain forest is more resourceful for these macaques as the latter contains an abundance of food. Researchers discovered that out of the 107 identified tree species, 74 of them were vital macaque food species with the remaining being food species of secondary importance. The latter information was put together due to a study that took place in the Bantimurung Bulusaraung National Park and specifically in the Karaenta area, a former nature reserve, where high density of fig trees as well as the fact that the Karaenta forest is separated from bigger forest tracts have led to a high population density of Moor macaques. As a result, Moor macaques have limited home ranges at this location.

The karst tower forest is less useful for the macaques in terms of acquiring food or other related resources but acts as a natural refuge from human disturbance. Another important area with significant Moor macaques is the Tabo-tabo forest in Pangkep and is considered to be a secondary forest area. The home range for primates is characterised by three factors; food availability, the distribution of the food, and the interval of changing fruit seasons.The Tabo-tabo forest is characterised as a secondary lowland forest and the latter created a suitable environment for the growth of plants on fertile alluvial and Mediterranean red soils.The high diversity of plants and shelter provision in the area made the land extremely suitable for these macaques to thrive.

== Behavior ==
The most common behavioural activities of Moor macaques are feeding, followed by moving, resting, and social interaction.

Moor macaques are a male dispersing species. Males leave the groups in which they are born between the ages of 7 and 9, while females stay in their birth groups. This has an important purpose, it avoids inbreeding and broadens the genetic pool of the groups. Moor macaques groups have been observed to be tolerant and not very aggressive. Group fission occurs in Moor macaques, competition between females for food does not seem to be the reason for fission. However, some studies relate group fission to competition among females for food resources, others attribute it to increased sexual competition among males, and some others relate this phenomenon to establishing home ranges, specifically in Moor macaque groups with overlapped home ranges.

The Sulawesi macaques, including Moor macaques, are further distinguishable from other macaques by their quiet bared-teeth display and the uttering of a loud call. Rather than conveying submission, as in most macaque species, the quiet bared-teeth display is thought to express the emitter's peaceful intentions, promoting positive interactions. All Sulawesi macaques, particularly adult males have emit a loud call, a particular, bird-like vocalization.

During agonistic encounters, wild Moor macaques have low inter-individual distances, uncommon strong aggression, a strong conciliatory tendency, and limited support for kin.

Predation is a key evolutionary factor. Snakes are one of the most prevalent primate predators, and the primates' quick detection of predators may have contributed to the evolution of their visual and perceptual skills. When primates notice a snake, they frequently respond by making alarm calls that attract and/or notify other members of the group about its presence, and/or by mobbing it.

=== Sexual behavior ===
Perineal swelling is an important factor in the sexual life of Moor macaques. As this species does not have a marked reproductive season, not all females swell at the same time. Females start to swell between the age of 4 years and 6 years and have their first child between the age of 6 years and 7 years. Swelling individuals are more likely mounted by the males than non-swelling ones. The dominant and oldest female of the group is usually mounted by the alpha male. Non-alpha males only mount females when the alpha is out of sight and lower ranking males usually mount non-swelling females, although in most Moor macaque groups, there is only one male. Poor dietary factors appear to be associated with a delay in the onset of perineal swelling and first parturition.

From the end of the rainy season to the start of the dry season, there appeared to be a rise in births. The moor macaques are classified as moderately seasonal breeders based on the fact that 33-67% of their newborns occur in a single three-month period. The peak might be explained by yearly increases in food supply, particularly a rise in fruit.

Female reproductive state differences within a group may have an effect on female furcation patterns, which may be more noticeable in egalitarian species where social interactions are less impacted by dominance or kinship. This furcation pattern may be caused by the tendency of adult females that are not cycling to stay near to one another.

=== Social behavior ===
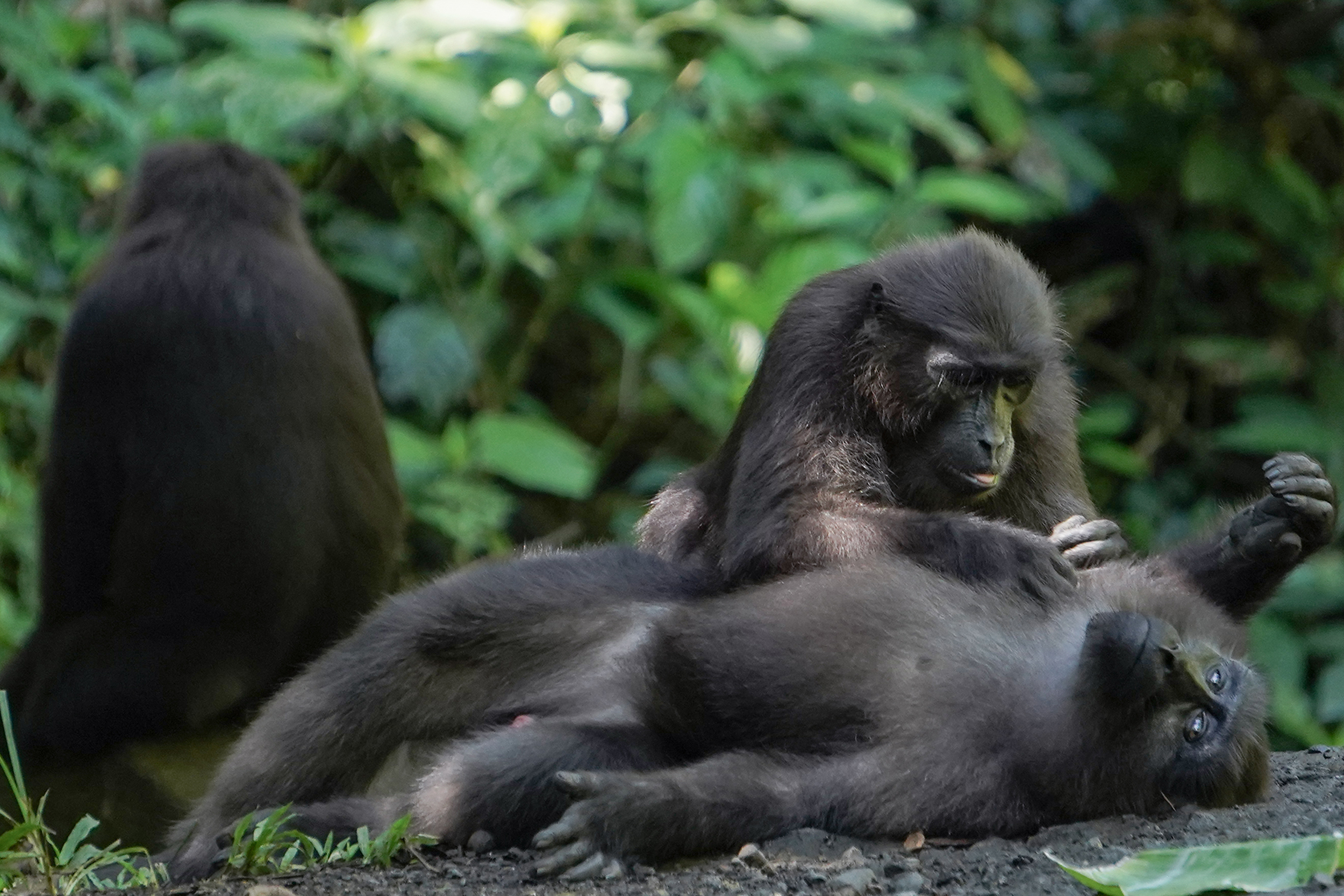
Grooming among moor macaques in their natural habitat at Bantimurung–Bulusaraung National Park, Indonesia.

Changes in group fission process and furcation patterns may reflect differences in social characteristics among species as well as ecological and demographic differences among populations; thus, studies of group fission may contribute to our general understanding of why primates live in a variety of groupings.

Special relationships between certain males and females can either trigger or encourage group fission. In Moor macaques, however, significant connection between specific males and females does not appear to affect the process of fission. Moor macaque females are not actively involved in intergroup interactions. On the other hand, male aggression toward other groups is significantly more frequent than female aggression. Adult female furcation patterns can be anticipated by their connection with one another, such as grooming behavior, prior to group fission. However, the grooming habit of mature female Moor macaques was unrelated to the furcation. Individuals of similar age, sex, or rank tend to stay close to one another.

Moor macaques are an ideal taxon to examine interspecific diversity in play behavior among nonhuman primates. Play is an excessive, spontaneous, and self-rewarding behavior that serves no immediate purpose and frequently takes place in non-stressful circumstances. Moor macaques spend a larger proportion of their time in solitary and social play than in grooming interactions. Play sessions in Moor macaques include more individuals, large variety of play behaviors, great play face rates, great proportion of time in contact play, and high rate of reciprocal play‐biting. Aggressive escalations were not common in Moor macaques.

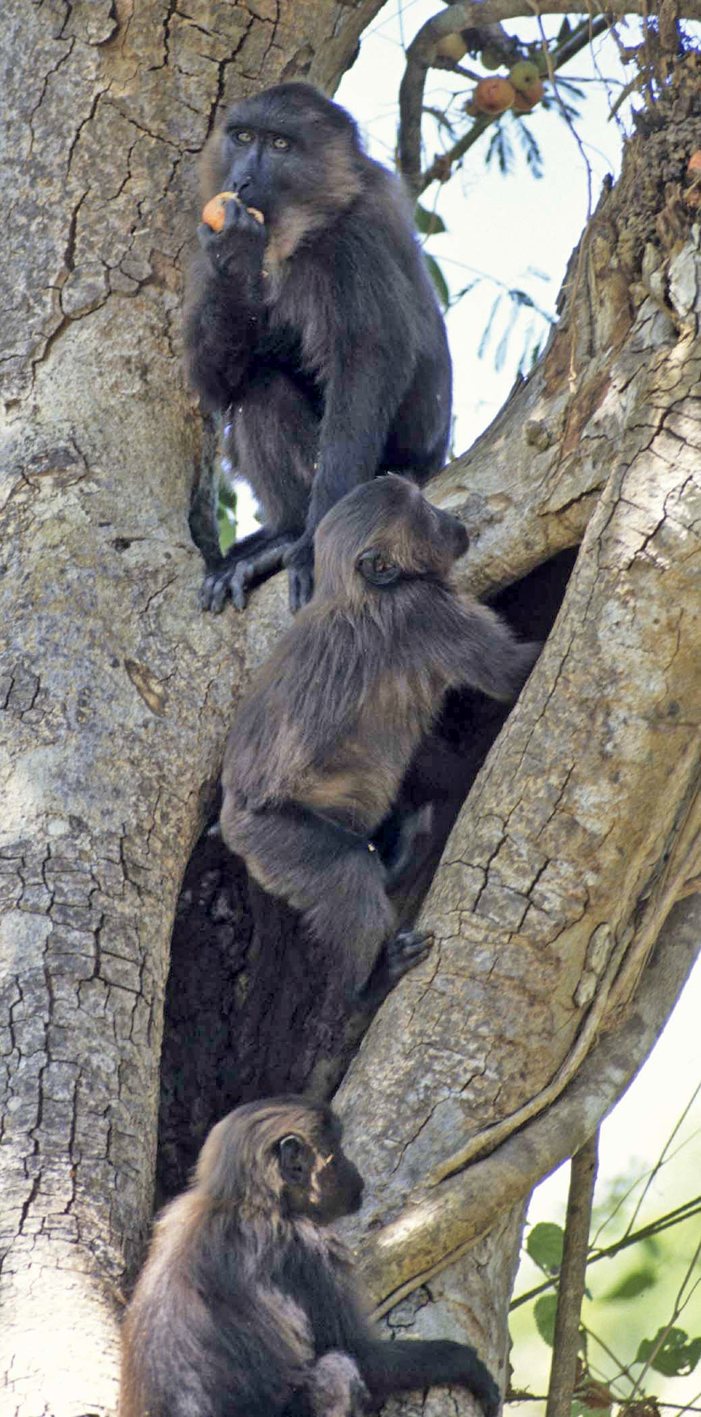
Feeding behavior observed in Moor macaques

=== Diet ===
Despite their frequently changing habitats, Moor macaques are characterized by having a flexible diet. Insects and other food items, including shoots and young leaves, are essential resources for Moor macaques, particularly in extensively altered habitats. The tree species known to be a diet are Garcinia nervosa, Arenga pinnata, Flacourtia rukam, Ficus. sp, Eugenia cuminii, Gastonia serratifolia, Mangifera sp., Spondias dulcis, and Muntingia calabura.

Compared to other macaques, kinship in Moor macaques may have less of an influence on proximity during feeding. Weak kinship effects during feeding may be caused by a lack of food competition within the group. When within-group competition (WGC) for food resources is intense, lower-ranking females are likely to move away from original groupings and create new smaller groups.

=== Maternity ===
Moor macaques usually stay close to their matrilineal relatives more when they are moving or resting than when they are feeding.

Females are in close proximity to females with newborn infants, regardless of the group's stage of activity.

== Interaction with humans ==
Anthropogenic factors such as habitat fragmentation, alterations, along with non-species-specific hunting traps in the forest have become major risks to the Moor macaques' survival, with more than half of the population declining over three decades.

Due to anthropogenic activities, Moor Macaque interactions with humans have increased. Primates are often victims of such occurrences because they have a hard time adapting to environmental disturbances. Due to their endemic status to the island of Sulawesi, most of their interactions used to be with the Bantimurung Bulusaraung National Park staff and researchers who would feed them, which is considered as consistent provisioning. Starting the year 2015, they started interacting with vehicles that would drive along a road located in their home range, which is considered as inconsistent provisioning. Based on the available research, human interaction damages the social networks of these macaques, and the latter is necessary for increase of infant survival, social ranking, reproductive success, and even enhanced thermoregulation during winter.

According to a study about the habituation process, Moor macaques react differently to the presence of humans depending on their previous interactions with them. Moor macaques are better approached in areas of greater visibility with more trees. Food provisioning, in which people purposefully offer food to nonhuman primates, may result in rapid habituation of wildlife such that they approach humans for food, take food from their hands, and perhaps aggress toward them to elicit provisioning behavior. Provisioning can lead to reduced foraging energy consumption in monkeys, more time for resting and social behavior, and higher birth rates, provisioned foods can be good energy sources. However, because it is linked to a higher risk of injury, zoonotic disease transmission, and direct human interaction, provisioning may also be potentially dangerous for monkeys and other wildlife species.

Studies have found that the relatively widespread habit of pet macaque ownership among a variety of ethnic and religious groups on the island explain the bidirectional disease transmission. The majority of Sulawesi macaques kept as pets are captured as infants by opportunistically trapping wild mother-infant pairs or by using traps to reduce crop raiding, which resulted in competition for resources. Moor macaques' encounter rate is lower in areas with more open spaces and with no trees than in areas with greater forest cover. Moreover, the individual encounter rate is lower when more traps are found in an area and higher when more domestic animals are sighted in the area.

== Conservation ==
The tourism industry, hunting, agriculture and logging are some of the big threats to the Moor macaques because they highly contribute to their habitat loss. This resulted in the change and loss of 80% of Sulawesi's forests, with just 30% remaining in good condition - which means forest canopy unbroken by large clearings and only scattered signs of human activity. Therefore, Moor macaques' conservation has become a broader concern.

Even in areas that are under local protection, deforestation is still observed in many forests of the southern parts of the Sulawesi Island, thus conservation of the population of Moor macaques should be a priority since its population is declining at a high rate. For conservation purposes, information on life histories and demography is essential. The conservation status of Moor macaques is considered high. However, due to significant habitat degradation, the condition of Moor macaques does not warrant optimism. It has been recommended that new reserves be established as well as expanding the existing reserves. Based on a study, challenges for species and their conservation efforts occurred as a result of the shrinking of forest areas and the deterioration of forest quality as habitat. Additionally, growing human populations have had a substantial negative influence on both populations and habitats of Moor macaques.

According to a study done on the effects of anthropogenic activities on the population of Moor macaques, the population density of Moor macaques is low outside of protected areas and support the study's hypothesis that the population of this species is declining in several regions, especially in the southern forests of the species' geographic range. Furthermore, they found a high presence of anthropogenic activity in forests inhabited by Moor macaques, and a negative effect of the number of non species-specific hunting traps in the forest on macaque encounter rate. In the National Park of Chamba District, South Sulawesi, there was an observed decrease in Moor macaques due to human settlement and road traffics which endanger the life of Moor macaques through food poisoning, and road accidents.

During a survey in South Sulawesi, there was a high encounter of Moor macaques in agroforests, where it was seen that Moor macaques like feeding on corn. This is a sign that different types of plantations can influence the distribution and encounter rate of Moor macaques. This, with different interviews with local people inhabiting the area surveyed, combining a well conserved forest with small agricultural patches on landscape scape can have a positive effect on the conservation of Moor macaques. With other studies done on the effect of agroforests on the conservation of Moor macaques, it has been observed that agroforests and forests cover can positively affect or increase the population of Moor macaques. Therefore, for better conservation and for the benefit of remnant subpopulations, forests in South Sulawesi Island should be protected and conserved. Raising awareness of the ecological importance of Moor macaques, and motivating people to conduct activities that are ecologically sustainable are also good actions towards the conservation of Moor macaques. While there are some studies done in South Sulawesi, more studies have to be conducted on other parts of the Island for an adequate conservation of this species.
