= 2026 Indonesia Air Transport ATR 42 crash =

Aviation accident in Indonesia

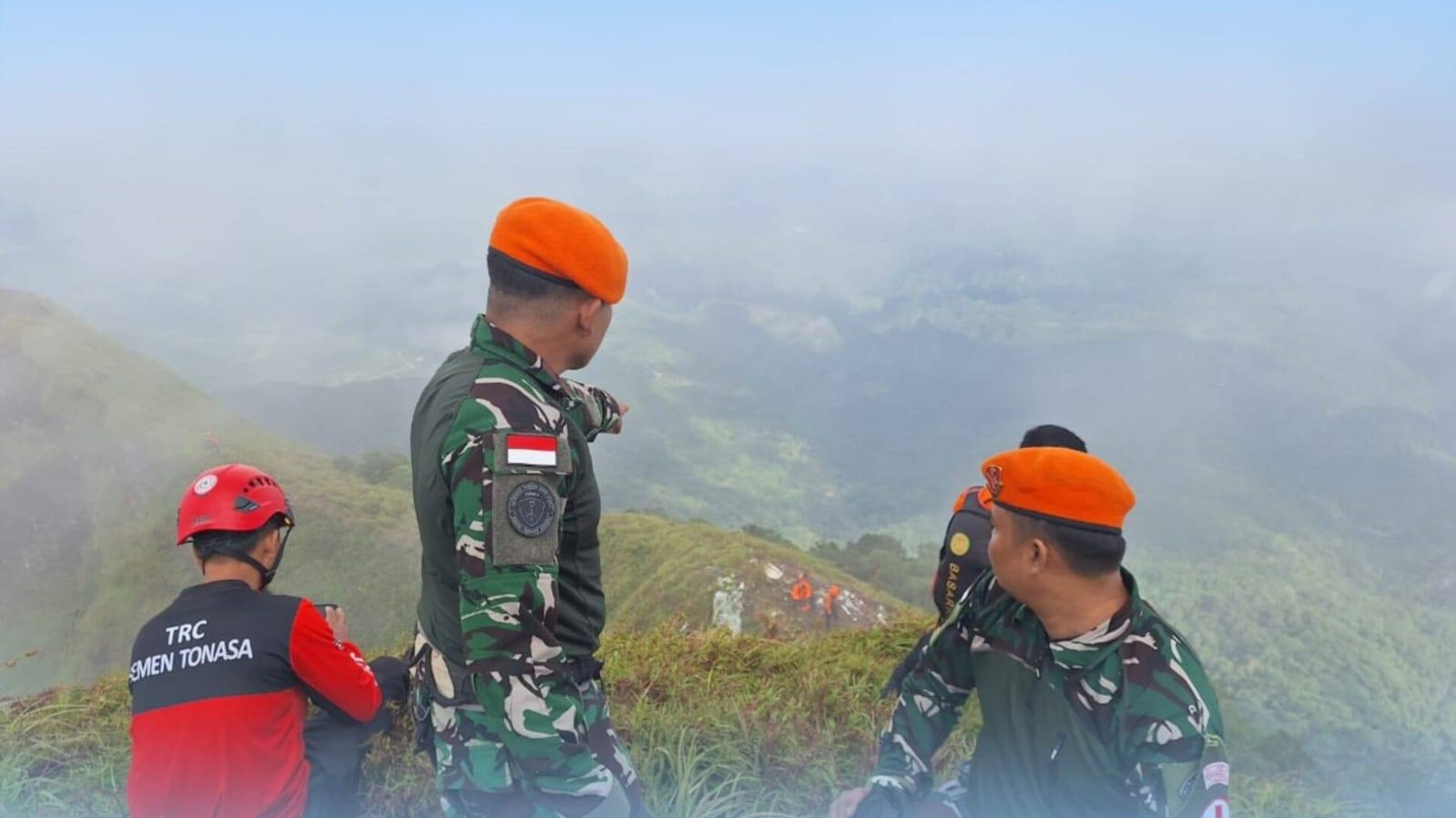
- The search and rescue team near the crash site

Accident
- Date: 17 January 2026
- Summary: Crashed into terrain on approach; under investigation
- Site: Near Bulusaraung mountain, South Sulawesi, Indonesia; 04°55′48″S 119°44′52″E

Aircraft
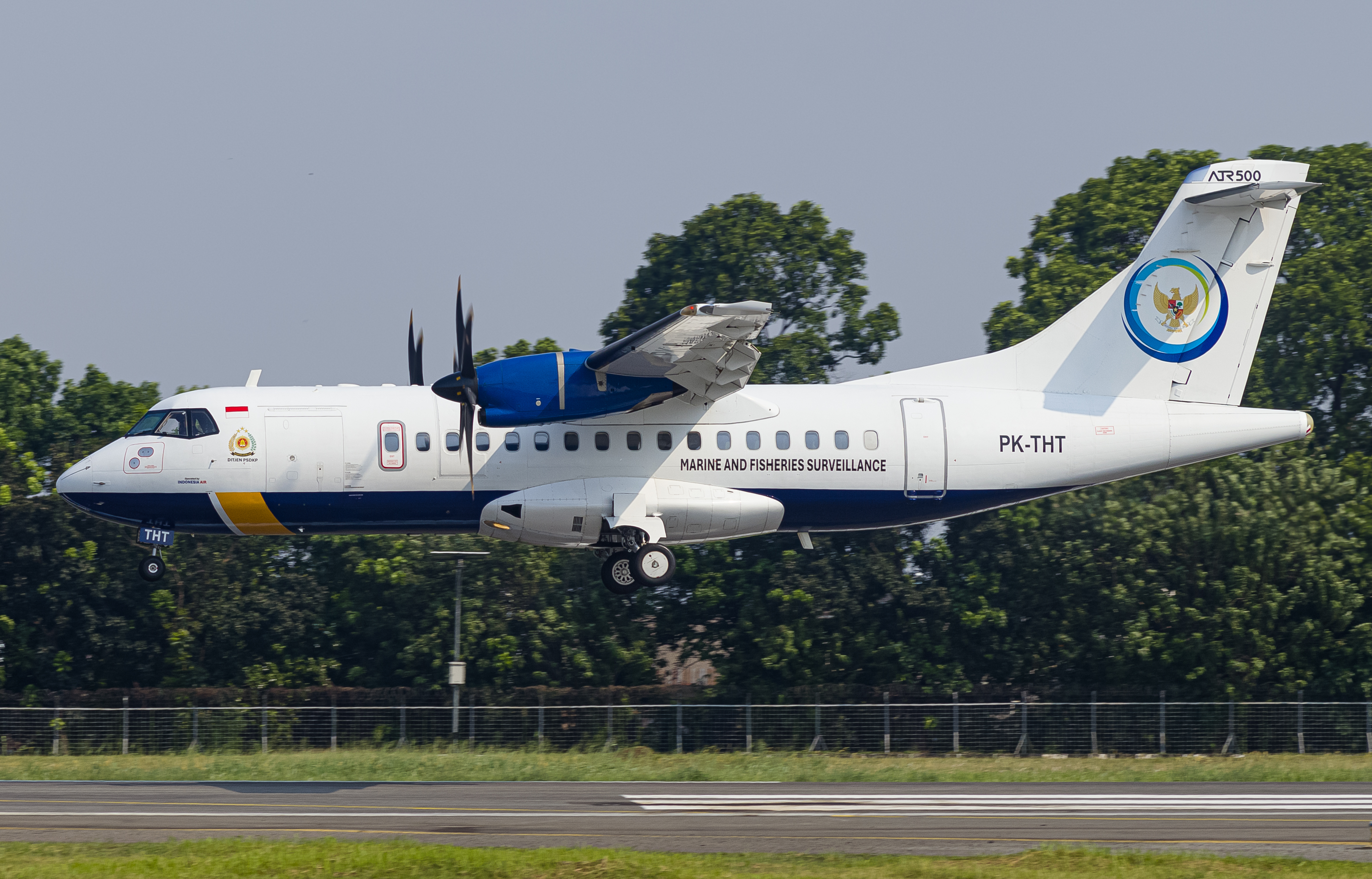
- PK-THT, the aircraft involved in the accident, seen in 2025
- Aircraft type: ATR 42-500
- Operator: Indonesia Air Transport on behalf of Directorate General of Marine and Fisheries Resources Surveillance
- Registration: PK-THT
- Flight origin: Adisutjipto Airport, Yogyakarta, Indonesia
- Destination: Sultan Hasanuddin International Airport, Makassar, Indonesia
- Occupants: 10
- Passengers: 3
- Crew: 7
- Fatalities: 10
- Survivors: 0

On 17 January 2026, an ATR 42 operated by Indonesia Air Transport crashed while flying from Adisutjipto Airport to Sultan Hasanuddin International Airport in Indonesia. Air traffic control reportedly lost contact with the flight in the South Sulawesi area, and the aircraft was ultimately found to have crashed in the Bulusaraung mountain area. All ten people on board were killed. Burning wreckage was found in a remote area.

The incident resulted a large search and rescue operation that involved the National Search and Rescue Agency, AirNav Indonesia, Indonesian Air Force, the local government, and surrounding community.

== Aircraft ==
The aircraft involved in the accident was an ATR 42-512 with the manufacturer serial number 611 and registration PK-THT. The aircraft was owned by Indonesia Air Transport, and it was operating the flight on behalf of the Indonesian Directorate General of Marine and Fisheries Resources Surveillance. The aircraft carried three directorate staff and seven crew members.

== Accident ==
Sources report that the aircraft was not on the correct flight path during approach. The aircraft made its last contact with ATC at a distance of about 20 km (12 mi) from its destination airport, at 1:37 pm local time. During the time of the disappearance, local residents reported witnessing an explosion and seeing smoke in Mount Bulusaraung, located inside the Bantimurung–Bulusaraung National Park in Pangkajene and Islands Regency, South Sulawesi.

== Search and rescue ==
Rescue teams were searching the area where the aircraft wreckage was located. Ground teams and helicopters were involved in the operations. Search efforts were complicated by adverse weather conditions in the area. Hikers in the area found debris that belonged to the crashed aircraft.

The crew of a rescue helicopter found debris from the aircraft's window at 7:46 WITA on 18 January 2026. At 7:49, large parts of the aircraft were discovered, with the tail section seen at the bottom of the mountain slope. Search and rescue operations lasted until 23 January, when all 10 bodies were recovered.

== Investigation ==
On 21 January, both of the aircraft's flight recorders were found in the wreckage. They were sent to the National Transportation Safety Committee for analysis.

On 20 February, the NTSC released their preliminary report. The preliminary report found that the GNSS system in the airplane was recorded in Degrade mode, which triggered the message "UNABLE RNP" to show in the Multi Control Display Unit.

Throughout the flight, the GNSS system continuously degraded, and the flight data recorder recorded a 16 nautical mile difference between ADS-B ground data and the data transmitted by the GNSS system of the plane during the approach. The preliminary report also found that the plane also struggled to fly to waypoints given from tower for the approach into the airfield, further indicating degraded navigational performance.

== See also ==
- Trigana Air Flight 267 – another ATR 42 that crashed into terrain in Indonesia
- List of aviation accidents and incidents in Indonesia
