= Borimasunggu =

- Location in South Sulawesi and Indonesia Borimasunggu (Indonesia)
- Coordinates: 4°45′11.1708″S 119°30′19.7064″E
- Country: Indonesia
- Province: South Sulawesi
- Regency: Pangkajene and Islands Regency
- District: Labakkang District
- Elevation: 13 ft (4 m)

Population (2010)
  - Total: 3,840
- Time zone: UTC+8 (Indonesia Central Standard Time)

Borimasunggu is a village in Labakkang district, Pangkajene and Islands Regency in South Sulawesi province. Its population is 3840.

== Climate ==
Borimasunggu has a tropical monsoon climate (Am) with moderate to little rainfall from July to September and heavy to very heavy rainfall from October to June.

Climate data for Borimasunggu
Month	Jan	Feb	Mar	Apr	May	Jun	Jul	Aug	Sep	Oct	Nov	Dec	Year
Mean daily maximum °C (°F)	29.6 (85.3)	29.8 (85.6)	30.2 (86.4)	30.9 (87.6)	31.3 (88.3)	31.0 (87.8)	31.0 (87.8)	31.6 (88.9)	32.0 (89.6)	32.2 (90.0)	31.2 (88.2)	29.9 (85.8)	30.9 (87.6)
Daily mean °C (°F)	26.3 (79.3)	26.5 (79.7)	26.6 (79.9)	26.9 (80.4)	27.2 (81.0)	26.6 (79.9)	26.1 (79.0)	26.2 (79.2)	26.7 (80.1)	27.2 (81.0)	27.1 (80.8)	26.5 (79.7)	26.7 (80.0)
Mean daily minimum °C (°F)	23.1 (73.6)	23.3 (73.9)	23.1 (73.6)	23.0 (73.4)	23.1 (73.6)	22.2 (72.0)	21.2 (70.2)	20.9 (69.6)	21.4 (70.5)	22.2 (72.0)	23.0 (73.4)	23.1 (73.6)	22.5 (72.5)
Average precipitation mm (inches)	588 (23.1)	533 (21.0)	400 (15.7)	255 (10.0)	251 (9.9)	104 (4.1)	56 (2.2)	39 (1.5)	56 (2.2)	125 (4.9)	342 (13.5)	638 (25.1)	3,387 (133.2)
Source: Climate-Data.org
