= Spermonde Archipelago =

Archipelago in South Sulawesi, Indonesia

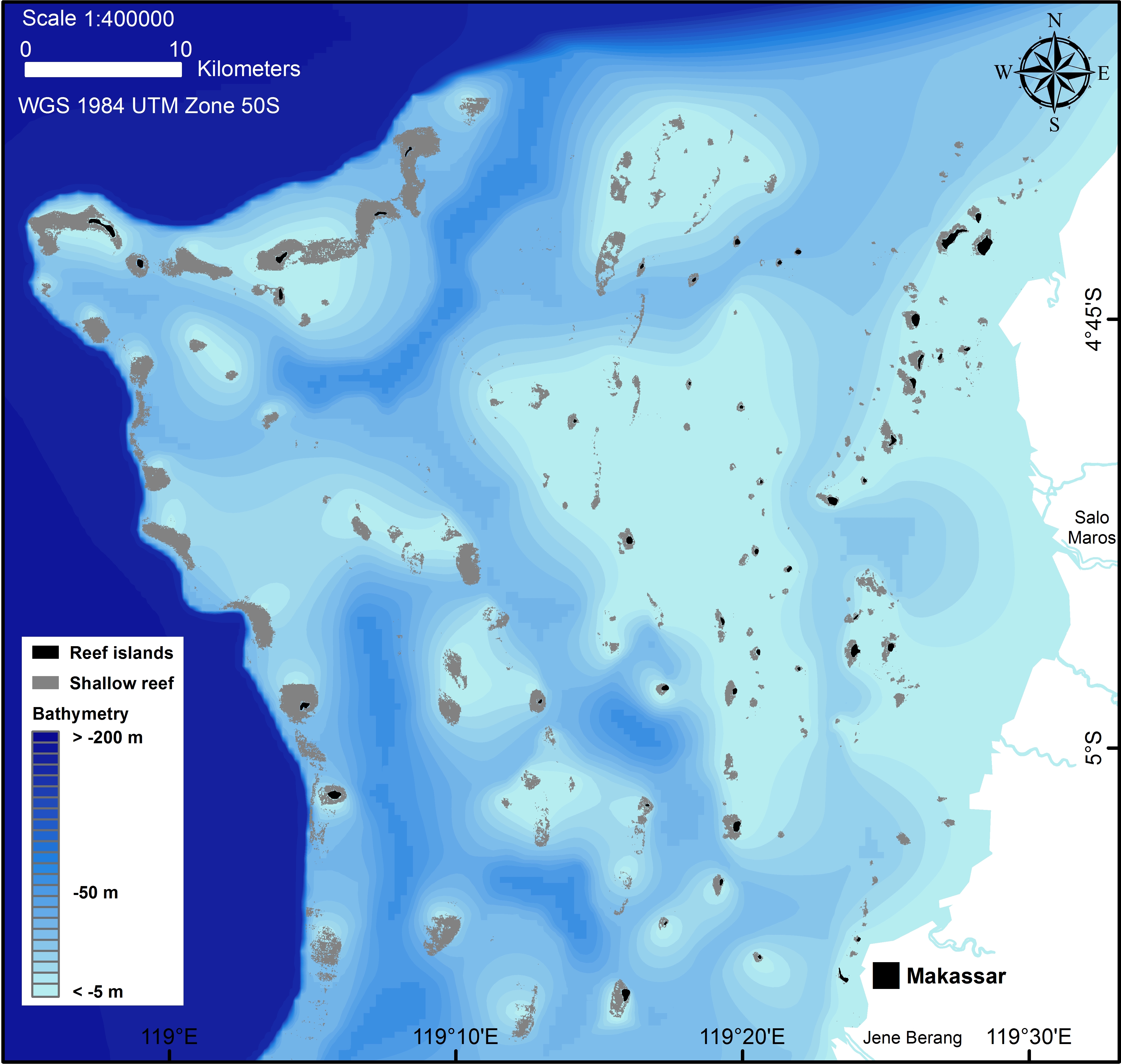
- Bathymetric map of the Spermondes
- Interactive map of Spermonde Archipelago

Geography
- Location: Java Sea
- Coordinates: 4°52′32.16″S 119°06′51.84″E
- Total islands: ~120

Administration
- Indonesia
- Area covered: 140.00 km^{2} (54.05 sq mi)

Demographics
- Population: 33,379 (mid 2023 estimate)
- Pop. density: 238.4/km^{2} (617.5/sq mi)

Additional information
- Time zone: Indonesia Central Time (UTC+8)

The Spermonde Archipelago (also known as the Sangkarang or Pabbiring Archipelago) is a group of around 120 islands off the southwest coast of Sulawesi in Indonesia, located within the Coral Triangle, between the southern arc of Sulawesi and the Strait of Makassar. They comprise two administrative districts (Kecamatan Liukang Tupabbiring and Kecamatan Liukang Tupabbiring Utara) within the Pangkajene and Islands Regency of Indonesia's South Sulawesi Province. Situated west of Makassar, the archipelago covers a land area of approximately 140 km^{2}, and comprises around 50 vegetated islands and 70 unvegetated sand cays, of which 43 in total are named. About 50 islands are inhabited, collectively home to 31,293 people at the 2020 Census, and officially estimated at 33,379 as of mid-2023.
