= Indonesia Air Transport =

Indonesian airline

IATA	ICAO	Call sign
I8	IDA	INTRA
- Founded: 1968; 58 years ago
- Hubs: Halim Perdanakusuma International Airport
- Fleet size: 1
- Destinations: 4 scheduled
- Parent company: MNC Media
- Headquarters: Jakarta, Indonesia
- Website: www.indonesia-air.com

Indonesia Air Transport (IAT or sometimes called INDAT) is an airline and aviation company based in Jakarta, Indonesia. It provides a wide range of aviation services to both the on and offshore oil, gas and mining industries within Indonesia and South-east Asia. Its main base is Halim Perdanakusuma International Airport, Jakarta. The company also maintains a secondary hub for its oil and gas industry clients at Sultan Aji Muhammad Sulaiman Airport, East Kalimantan, and operates limited scheduled services from Ngurah Rai International Airport on the island of Bali to the islands of Lombok and Flores. Indonesia Air Transport is listed in category 1 by Indonesian Civil Aviation Authority for airline safety quality. The company provides air passenger and cargo transportation, aircraft hiring and leasing services, aircraft repairs, and training facilities. IAT also supplies aviation technical equipment and spare parts. It operates various types of fixed-wing aircraft and helicopters.

Other operations include tourism charter work, photo mapping and magnometer survey missions, executive jet services, medical and medevac operation support, air cargo requirements including operations from short or unimproved airstrips, maintenance facilities in Jakarta and Balikpapan and East Kalimantan. Indonesia Air Transport has certification from the Department of Transportation of Republic Indonesia and Eurocopter claims over 20,000 safe flight hours on helicopter SA365 Dauphin C2.

== History ==
The airline was established and started operations in 1968, initially for state oil company Pertamina and its foreign oil production sharing contractors. The airline is operated by PT Indonesia Air Transport Tbk and the company is currently listed on the Jakarta (JKT) Stock exchange (IDX: IATA).

PT Global Transport Services, a subsidiary of PT Bhakti Investama Tbk (MNC Media Group) and PT Global Mediacom Tbk, the southeast Asia's largest and most integrated media group, is owner of PT Indonesia Air Transport Tbk. In March 2007 the company had 246 employees. In 2010 the company was reported as having 232 employees.

== Destinations ==
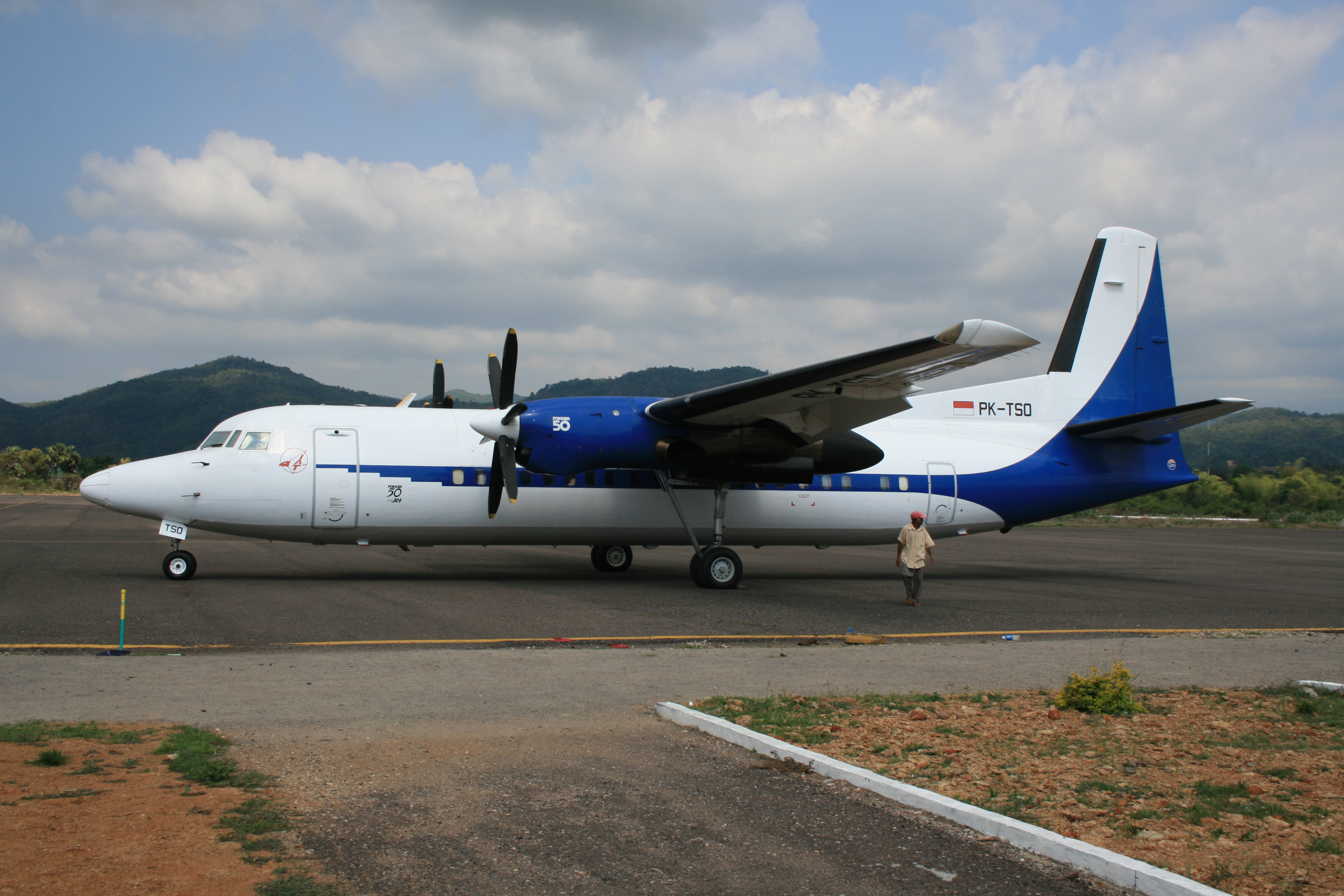
An IAT Fokker 50 parked at Labuan Bajo's Komodo Airport

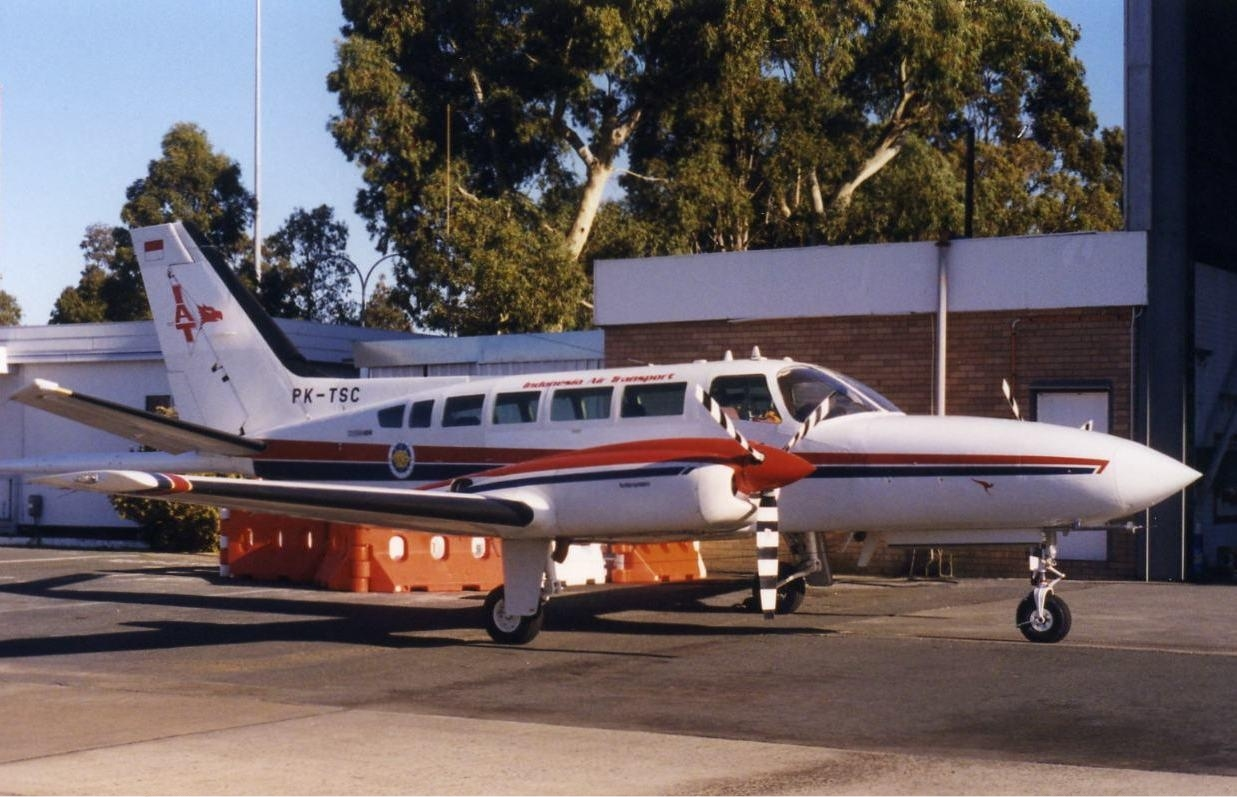
IAT Cessna 404 at Perth Airport (1999).

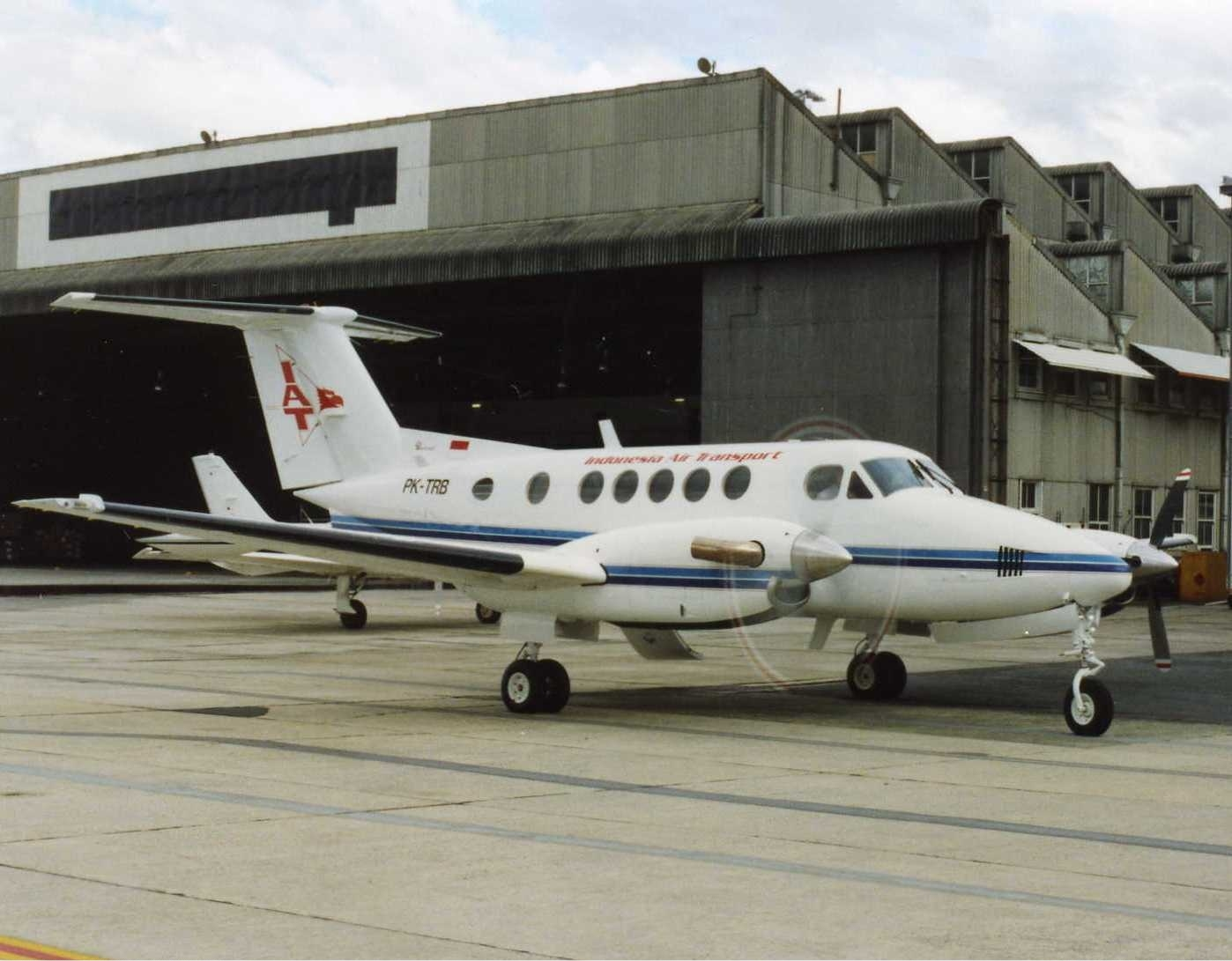
IAT Beech Super King Air at Perth Airport (early 1990s).

Country	City	Airport	Notes	Refs
Australia	Perth	Perth Airport	Terminated	
Australia	Sydney	Sydney Airport	Terminated	
Indonesia	Balikpapan	Sultan Aji Muhammad Sulaiman Sepinggan Airport	Terminated	
Indonesia	Bandung	Husein Sastranegara Airport	Terminated	
Indonesia	Bontang	PT Badak Bontang Airport	Terminated	
Indonesia	Denpasar	Ngurah Rai International Airport		
Indonesia	Jakarta	Halim Perdanakusuma International Airport	Hub	
Indonesia	Ketapang	Rahadi Oesman Airport	Terminated	
Indonesia	Labuan Bajo	Komodo International Airport		
Indonesia	Lombok	Lombok International Airport	Terminated	
Indonesia	Lombok	Selaparang Airport	Airport Closed	
Indonesia	Medan	Kualanamu International Airport	Terminated	
Indonesia	Padang	Minangkabau International Airport	Terminated	
Indonesia	Palembang	Sultan Mahmud Badaruddin II International Airport	Terminated	
Indonesia	Pangkalan Bun	Iskandar Airport	Terminated	
Indonesia	Pekanbaru	Sultan Syarif Kasim II International Airport	Terminated	
Indonesia	Pontianak	Supadio International Airport	Terminated	
Indonesia	Sintang	Tebelian Airport	Terminated	
Indonesia	Surakarta	Adisoemarmo International Airport	Terminated	

== Fleet ==
=== Current fleet ===
Indonesia Air Transport fleet
Aircraft	In service	Orders	Passengers	Notes
Embraer EMB-135BJ Legacy	1	—		
Total	1	—		

=== Former fleet ===
The airline previously operated the following aircraft (as of January 2026):

According to the Directorate General of Civil Aviation in September 2010 the Indonesia Air Transport fleet consisted of 21 aircraft. As a total of 32 aircraft appear on charter availability lists possibly IAT are dry leasing some further aircraft such as the Short's, the Grumman Gulfstream I, and the Squirrels.

Indonesia Air Transport former fleet
Aircraft	In fleet	Orders	Passengers	Routes
Dauphin AS-350BA Squirrel Helicopter	2	0	6	Charter operations/these aircraft are not currently registered to IAT
Dauphin SA 365 N2 Helicopter	3	0	12	Charter operations
Eurocopter EC 135 P2 Helicopter	1	0	13	Charter operations
Eurocopter EC 155 B1 Helicopter	3	0	13	Charter operations
Eurocopter EC 155 B Helicopter	1	0	13	Charter operations
Dauphin SA 365 DAU Helicopter	3	0	12	Charter operations
Bell 212 (IFR) Twin Two Twelve Helicopter	2	0	12	Charter operations/these aircraft are not currently registered to IAT
Aérospatiale Lama SA-315B Helicopter	1	0	4	Charter operations/this aircraft is not currently registered to IAT
Dassault Falcon DA-20F	1	0	9	Charter
Citation 111 CE-650	1	0	8	Charter operations/this aircraft is not currently registered to IAT
Fokker 50	1	0	58	Domestic routes
Fokker F27	1	0	34	Domestic routes/possible charter operations, registered to IAT as PK-TSJ
ATR 42-300QC	1	0	45	Domestic routes/charter operations
ATR 42-500	3	0	36	Charter operations One crashed
Grumman Gulfstream I, G159	1	0	19	Charter operations/this aircraft is not currently registered to IAT
Short's Skyvan SC7-2	4	0	18	Charter operations/these aircraft are not currently registered to IAT
Beechcraft 1900D Airliner	2	0	18	Charter operations
Embraer Legacy 600	1	0		
Airbus A320-200	1	0	180	Domestic routes
Total	31	0		Last updated: 17 January 2026

At August 2006 the airline also operated:

- BAC One-Eleven 400, 1 Aircraft
- BAC One-Eleven 475, 1 Aircraft

== Accidents and incidents ==
=== PK-THT ===
On 17 January 2026, an ATR 42-500, registered as PK-THT, crashed near Maros with 10 people on board.

== Expansion ==
In September 2012, the company has proposing to change its aviation business licence (Surat Izin Usaha Pererbangan) to Transportation Ministry for including medium class regular flight with Husein Sastranegara International Airport, Bandung as the hub. Initial regular flight occurred on February 22, 2013 from Bandung to Medan.
