= Bungoro =

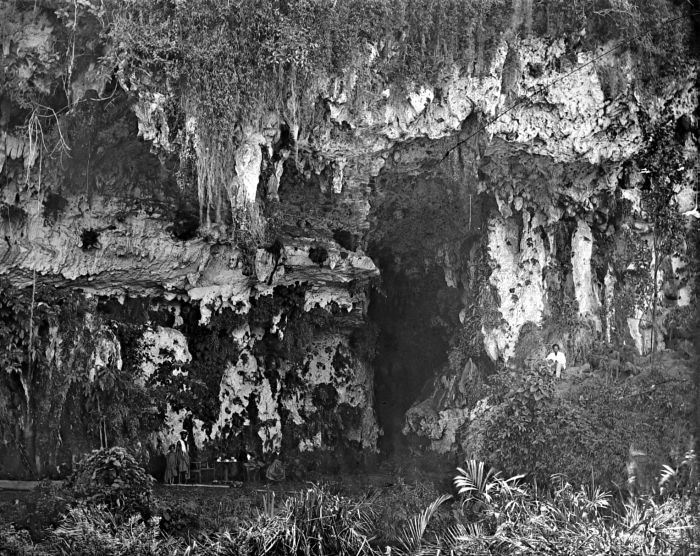
Bungoro Cave

Bungoro is a district in Pangkajene Islands Regency, South Sulawesi, Indonesia. It was visited by Portuguese ships from 1542 to 1948. On May 30, 2011, a fire gutted 2 of PT Semen Tonasa IV machines in Bungoro and halted the production for 10 days with financial losses of about Rp.45 billion ($5.3 million). The plant was owned by PT Semen Gresik Group (Semen Indonesia).
