= Directorate General of Marine and Fisheries Resources Surveillance =

Directorate General of Surveillance for Marine and Fisheries Resources Direktorat Jenderal Pengawasan Sumber Daya Kelautan dan Perikanan
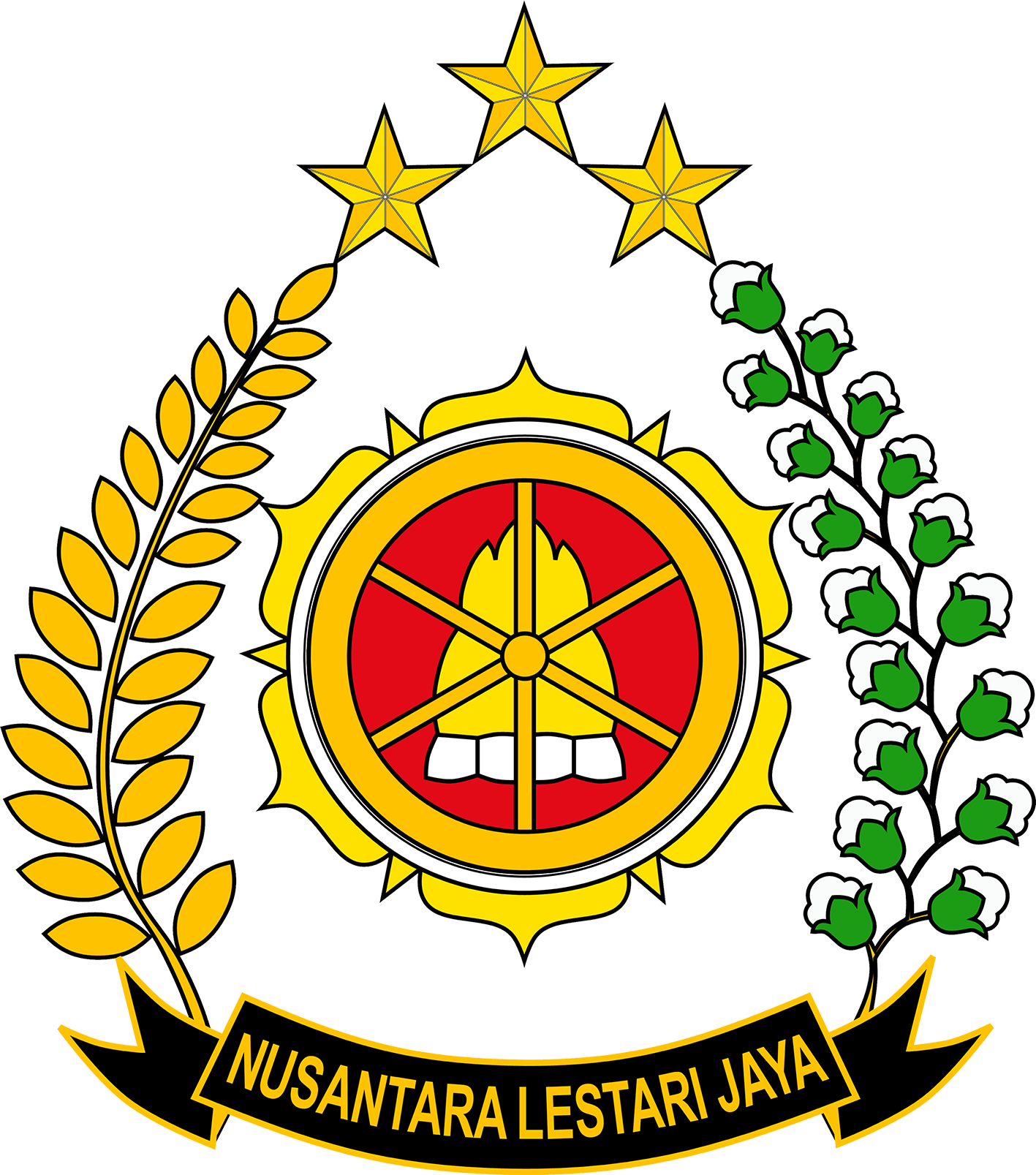
- Logo of the Directorate General of Surveillance for Marine and Fisheries Resources
- Abbreviation: PSDKP
- Motto: Nusantara Lestari Jaya "To protect the glorious Nusantara"

Agency overview
- Formed: 23 November 2000

Jurisdictional structure
- National agency (Operations jurisdiction): Indonesia
- Operations jurisdiction: Indonesia
- Legal jurisdiction: Indonesian Maritime Zone
- Governing body: Government of Indonesia
- Constituting instrument: Kepres Nomor 165 Tahun 2000
- Specialist jurisdiction: Coastal patrol, marine border protection, marine search and rescue

Operational structure
- Headquarters: Jalan Medan Merdeka Timur No. 16, Jakarta Pusat, Jakarta
- Elected officer responsible: Sakti Wahyu Trenggono, Minister of Maritime Affairs and Fisheries
- Agency executive: Pung Nugroho Saksono, Director General of PSDKP
- Parent agency: Ministry of Maritime Affairs and Fisheries

Website
- kkp.go.id/unit-kerja/djpsdkp.html

The Directorate General of Surveillance for Marine and Fisheries Resources (Indonesian: Direktorat Jenderal Pengawasan Sumber Daya Kelautan dan Perikanan - PSDKP) is a government agency under the management of the Ministry of Marine Affairs and Fisheries of the Republic of Indonesia for prevention of illegal, unreported and unregulated fishing in Indonesian waters.

== Background ==
Illegal, unreported and unregulated fishing activities in Indonesian waters have caused huge losses for Indonesia.

Overfishing, overcapacity, threats to the preservation of fish resources, unfavorable fishery business climate, the weakening of the competitiveness of firms and the marginalization of fishermen are the real impact of illegal fishing and destructive fishing activities.

Another disadvantage that can not be assessed materially but is strongly related to the national pride, is the negative image of the Indonesian nation among the international community because it is considered not able to manage marine and fishery resources properly.

The PSDKP was formally established on 23 November 2000 according to Presidential Decree No. 165/2000.

== Task and function ==
Based on Presidential Regulation No. 63/ 2015 on the Ministry of Marine Affairs and Fisheries and Regulation of the Minister of Marine Affairs and Fisheries No. 2/PERMEN-KP/2025 on the Organization and Working Procedures of the Ministry of Marine Affairs and Fisheries, PSDKP's primary task formulation and execution of marin and fisheries management. Its function are as follows:

- Develop policies in the field of marine and fisheries management, including but no limited to fishery control, operation of supervisory vessels, and handling of marine and fishery criminal acts.
- Execution of policies in the field of marine and fisheries management.
- Develop norms, standards, procedures and criteria in the field of marine and fisheries management.
- Provide technical guidance and supervision in the field of marine and fisheries management.
- Evaluate and report activity in the field of marine and fisheries management
- Perform administrative duty of the Directorate General of Marine and Fisheries Resources Surveillance
- Perform other task as instructed by Minister of Marine Affairs and Fisheries.

The legal basis for PSDKP in carrying out its task are as follows:

- Law No. 17/ 1985 on the Ratification of the United Nations Convention on the Law of the Sea
- Law No. 27/ 2007 amended by Law No. 1/ 2014 on the Management of Coastal Areas and Small Islands
- Law No. 21/ 2009 concerning the Endorsement of the Agreement for the Execution of the United Nations Convention on the Law of the Sea of 10 December 1982 Relating to the Conservation and Management of Straddling Fish Stocks and Highly Migratory Stocks;
- Law No. 32/ 2014 concerning Marine Affairs;
- Law No. 45/ 2009 on Amendment to Law Number 31 Year 2004 regarding Fisheries;
- Government Regulation Number 38 Year 2007 on the Division of Government Affairs between the Central Government and Regional Government (Province level, and Regency and City Level)
- Presidential Instruction No. 15 of 2011 on the Protection of Fishermen, which mandates the Ministry of Marine Affairs and Fisheries to take firm action against illegal, unreported, unregulated fishing and destructive fishing in Fishery Management Area of the Republic of Indonesia.

In addition, supervision of marine and fishery resources is also mandated by the following international conventions:

- United Nations Convention on the Law of the Sea (UNCLOS) 1982;
- Agreement to Promote Compliance with International Conservation and Management Measure By Fishing Vessel on The High Seas (FAO Compliance Agreement, 1993);
- Agreement to Execution of The United Nations Convention on The Law of The Sea of 10 December 1982 Relating To The Conservation and Management of Straddling Fish Stock and Highly Migratory Fish Stocks (Fish Stock Agreement) 1995;
- Code of Conduct for Responsible Fisheries (CCRF), 1995;
- International Plan of Action (IPOA) to Prevent, Deter and Eliminate Illegal, Unreported and Unregulated (IUU) Fishing, 2001;
- Regional Plan of Action (RPOA) to Promote Responsible Fishing Practices Including Combating IUU Fishing in the Region.

== Organisation ==
PSDKP is an Echelon I Unit under the Ministry of Marine Affairs and Fisheries. PSDKP is also coordinate with other unit within Ministry of Marine Affairs and Fisheries in performing its duties.

- Directorate General of Marine and Fisheries Resources Surveillance
  - Secretariat of Directorate General
  - Directorate of Fleet Monitoring and Operation
  - Directorate of Marine Resources Management Supervision
  - Directorate of Fisheries Management Supervision
  - Directorate of Marine Offence Management

=== Technical Execution Unit ===
The Technical Execution Unit (UPT) of PSDKP was established based on the Decree of the Minister of Marine Affairs and Fisheries No.33/PERMEN-KP/2016 on the Organization and Working Procedures of the Technical Execution Unit in the Field of Marine and Fishery Resources Control.

In accordance with the Ministerial Regulation, UPT PSDKP is tasked for execution of supervision of marine and fishery resources based on the prevailing laws and regulations.

The UPT PSDKP is categorized into 2 (two), which are Marine and Fishery Resource Base (Echelon II Equivalent Working Unit) and Marine and Fishery Resource Control Station (Echelon IVA equivalent Working Unit). 14 UPTs have been formed:

- PSDKP Batam Station
- PSDKP Benoa Station
- PSDKP Bitung Station
- PSDKP Jakarta Station
- PSDKP Lampulo Station
- PSDKP Tual Station
- PSDKP Ambon Station
- PSDKP Belawan Station
- PSDKP Biak Station
- PSDKP Cilacap Station
- PSDKP Kupang Station
- PSDKP Station Pontianak
- PSDKP Tahuna Station
- PSDKP Tarakan Station

UPT PSDKP is also supported by the Working Unit (Satuan Kerja/ Satker) PSDKP and PSDKP office spread throughout the territory of Indonesia. To date, 58 Working units and 142 PSDKP offices have been formed.

== Equipment ==
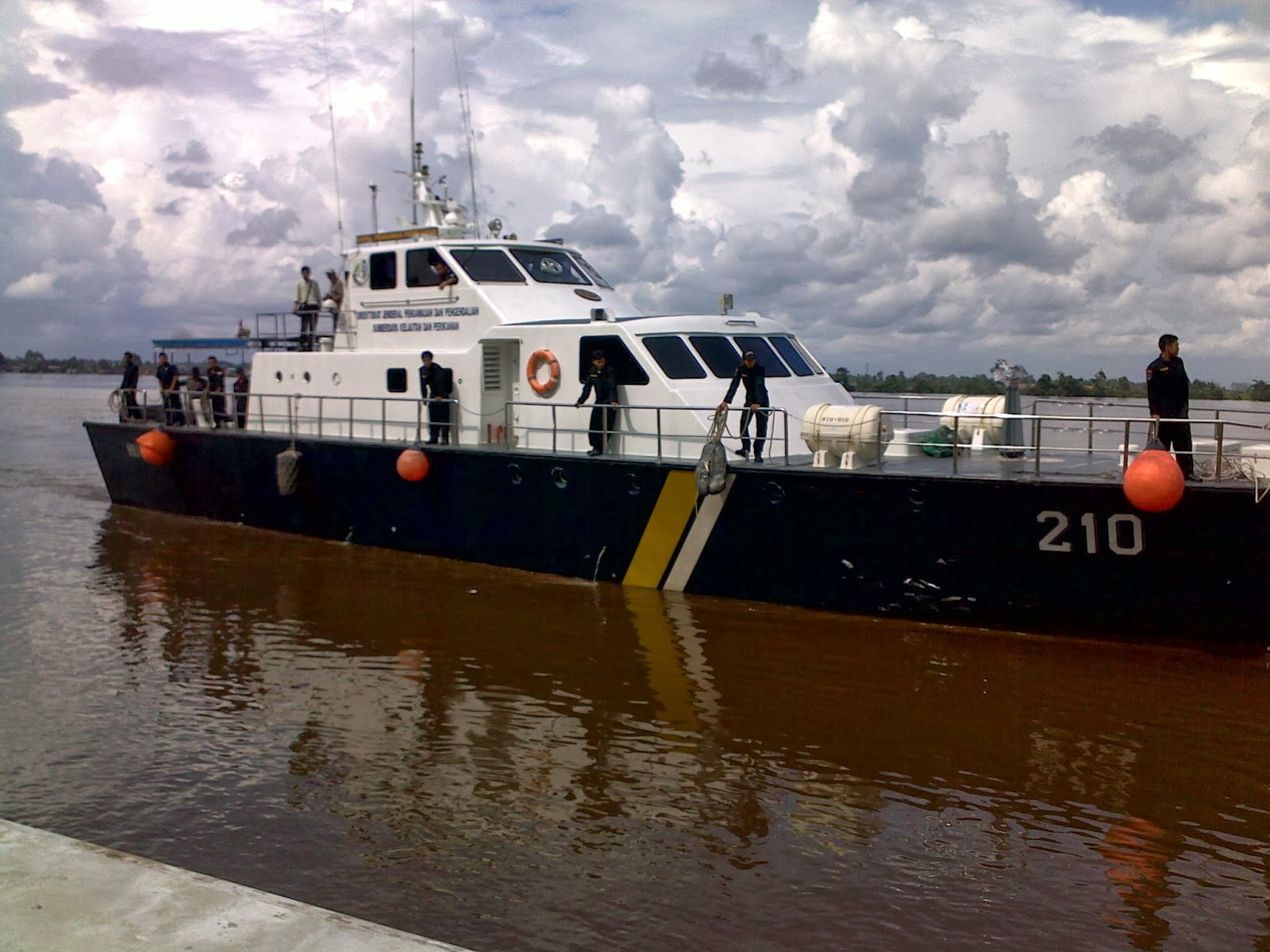
A patrol boat belonging to the Directorate General of Marine and Fisheries Resources Surveillance

=== Manpower ===
As of 2024, the PSDKP has a total of 1513 personnel. This consists out of 352 fisheries supervisors, 204 marine supervisors, 505 sailors and ship crew, and 270 investigators.

Fisheries supervisors are responsible for overseeing the orderly implementation of laws and regulations in the fisheries sector. Marine supervisors are responsible for conducting supervision in the management of coastal areas and 204 small islands. Sailors and ship crew conduct patrols with the various vessels owned by the PSDKP. Lastly investigators carry out investigations on cases related to fisheries in Indonesia.

=== Vessel Monitoring System (VMS) ===
VMS is the application of information technology which is one form of surveillance system in the field of fishing and / or transporting of fish, which uses the fishing equipment monitoring equipment that has been determined.

VMs Executions are implemented through the installation of transmitters on fishing vessels so that their movements can be monitored when performing fishing operations (ship position, velocity of vessel, track lane, and the occurrence of fishing activities indicated to be infringing).

Policies related to VMs continue to be updated in line with the strategic development of the fisheries sector and the development of monitoring technology.

To further optimize the function of VMS, PSDKP is designing an integrated system (Integrated Surveillance System / ISS) which is done by overlaying VMS data with data obtained through other monitoring means such as coastal radar (Coastal Radar) and Marine Surveillance Aircraft MSA).

=== Small Arms ===
As of 2024, the PSDKP is equipped with several small arms which include:

- 75 Pindad P3A pistols
- 75 Pindad SS1-V5 assault rifles
- 200 Pindad SS2-SB2 V2 assault rifles
- 167 Pindad PM1A2 submachine guns
- 10 Pindad SM5 heavy machine guns

=== Vessels ===
Surveillance vessels and speed boat functions are to carry out supervision and law enforcement in the field of fisheries. All vessels of PSDKP are named with the prefix KP (Kapal Pengawas or Patrol Boat). Speed boats do not make use of the prefix, and instead are only identifiable by their number. Surveillance vessels are categorized into five classes which is based on the length of the vessel, vessels smaller than 15 meters are categorized as speedboats. As of 2024, PSDKP has 125 surveillance vessels and speedboats, which consists out of:

- 6 Class I, 50 meter or larger surveillance vessels
- 5 Class II, 40 - 50 meter surveillance vessels
- 12 Class III, 30 - 40 meter surveillance vessels
- 10 Class IV, 20 - 30 meter surveillance vessels
- 1 Class V, 15 - 20 meter surveillance vessels
- 91 speedboats

=== Aircraft ===
As of 2026, the PSDKP operates one ATR 42-320 maritime patrol aircraft. The PSDKP previously also operated an ATR 42-500, but that aircraft was lost in an accident on 17 January 2026.

PSDKP aircraft are equipped with a special remote controlled camera that can be used to help monitor and detect activities when on patrol. While the aircraft greatly enhance the abilities of the PSDKP, they are not equipped with advanced surveillance radars, such as those equipped on the Navy's CN-235 maritime patrol aircraft.

== Cooperation with other agencies ==
In its mission to prevent illegal fishing, PSDKP has conducted joint-operations with the Indonesian Navy, Water Police, Sea and Coast Guard, the Maritime Security Agency and Customs. PSDKP is however, not associated with these agencies.

=== Indonesia-Australia Fisheries Surveillance Forum (IAFSF) ===
The Indonesia-Australia Fisheries Surveillance Forum (IAFSF) is part of the Indonesia-Australia Ministerial Forum (IAMF) dedicated to cooperation in the supervision of the SDKP, including the cooperation of illegal fishing in the border waters of both countries. In May 2021 a joint maritime patrol called Operation Gannet 5 is conducted within the framework of IAFSF.

=== Regional Plan of Action (RPOA) to Promote Responsible Fishing Practices ===
The RPOA includes combating illegal, unreported and unregulated (IUU) fishing in the Southeast Asia Region.

It is a regional initiative initiated by Indonesia-Australia and agreed by 11 countries: Indonesia, Malaysia, Thailand, Philippines, Vietnam, Cambodia, Singapore, Brunei Darussalam, Timor Leste, Australia and Papua New Guinea.

The goal is to realize responsible fishing activities including the IUU Fishing in the area of cooperation. This cooperation has been inaugurated by Indonesia and Australia since 2007, Indonesia has become the RPOA Secretariat.
