= Susilo Airport =

Former airport in West Kalimantan, Indonesia

Sintang Airport Susilo Airport
- IATA: ~~SQG~~; ICAO: ~~WIOS~~

Summary
- Airport type: Public, Defunct
- Operator: Sintang Government
- Serves: Sintang, West Kalimantan, Indonesia
- Closed: 26 April 2018
- Elevation AMSL: 98 ft (30 m)
- Coordinates: 00°03′49″N 111°28′29″E

Map
- Location of airport in Kalimantan (Borneo)

Runways
| Direction | Length | | Surface |
| Direction | m | ft | Surface |
|---|---|---|---|
| 08/26 | 1,300 | 4,265 | Concrete |

Sintang Airport ~~(IATA: SQG, ICAO: WIOS)~~, also known as Susilo Airport (Indonesian: Bandar Udara Susilo), was an airport serving Sintang, the principal town of the Sintang Regency in West Kalimantan, Indonesia. The airport's function has been replaced by Tebelian Airport since 26 April 2018.
