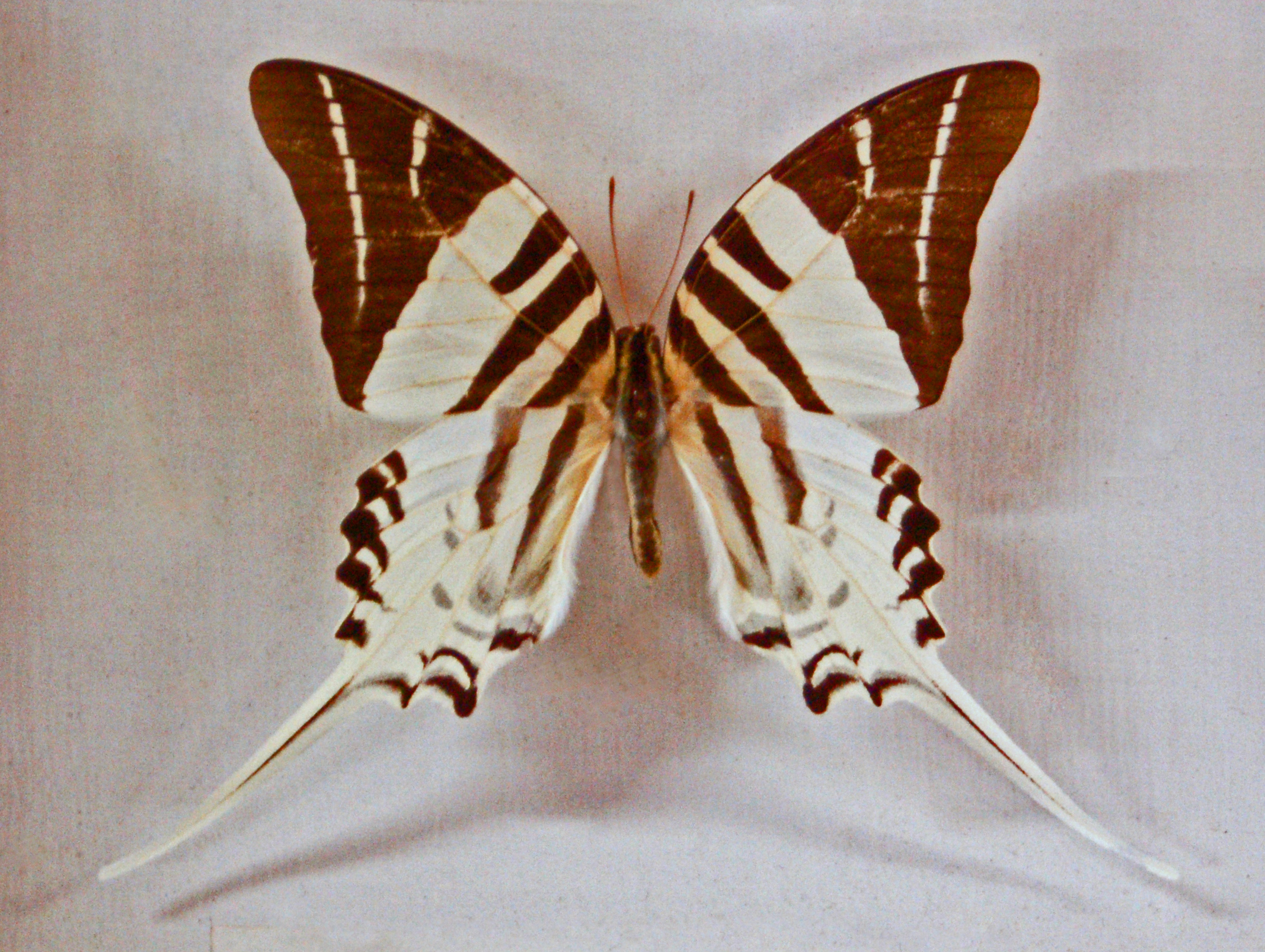
- At the National Museum in Prague

Scientific classification
- Kingdom: Animalia
- Phylum: Arthropoda
- Clade: Pancrustacea
- Class: Insecta
- Order: Lepidoptera
- Family: Papilionidae
- Genus: Graphium
- Species: G. androcles

Binomial name
- Graphium androcles (Boisduval, 1836)

Synonyms
- Papilio androcles Boisduval, 1836; Papilio androcles latilinea Joicey & Talbot, 1922; Papiliio androcles Rothschild, 1895; Pathysa androcles

= Graphium androcles =

Species of butterfly

Graphium androcles, the giant swordtail, is a butterfly of the genus Graphium belonging to the family Papilionidae (swallowtails). The species was first described by Jean Baptiste Boisduval in 1836.

== Description ==
Graphium androcles has a wingspan reaching about 80–120 millimetres (3.1–4.7 in). Females are larger than males. The base of the upper wings is white with three black diagonal parallel stripes. The other half of the upper wings is black, crossed by two thin white stripes. The hindwings are white, with black markings on the lower margin. The underside is similar to the upperside, but the white is partially greenish. The hindwings terminate in a very long "tail", which is the longest among all members of the relevant family. The body is black, with white sides of the abdomen.

== Distribution ==
Graphium androcles can be found in Indonesia (Sulawesi, Sula Islands).

== Protection ==
It is protected in Bantimurung – Bulusaraung National Park.
