= Tebelian Airport =

Airport in West Kalimantan, Indonesia

Tebelian Airport Bandar Udara Tebelian
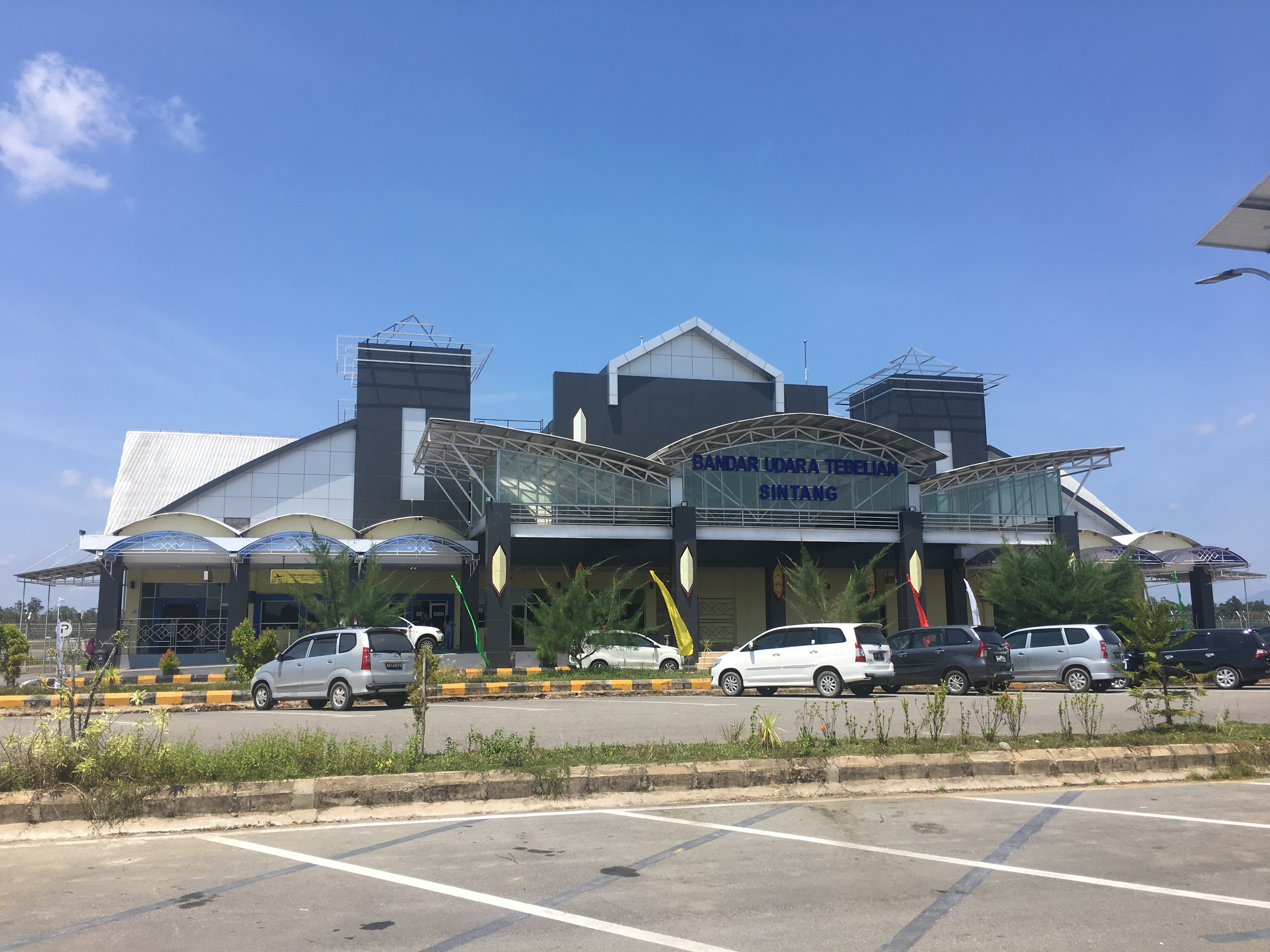
- IATA: SQG; ICAO: WIOS

Summary
- Airport type: Public
- Owner: Government of Indonesia
- Operator: Ministry of Transportation
- Serves: Sungai Tebelian, Sintang, West Kalimantan, Indonesia
- Time zone: WIB (UTC+07:00)
- Elevation AMSL: 30 ft (9.1 m)
- Coordinates: 00°02′31″S 111°27′24″E

Map
- Location of airport in Kalimantan (Borneo)

Runways
Direction	Length		Surface
Direction	m	ft	Surface
15/33	1,650	5,413	Asphalt

Tebelian Airport (Indonesian: Bandar Udara Tebelian) is an airport located in the Sungai Tebelian district of the Sintang Regency of West Kalimantan, Indonesia. The airport was inaugurated on April 26, 2018. The airport replaced the defunct Susilo Airport. The airport is located 14 kilometers from the Sintang city center. Besides the Sintang Regency, the airport also serves the Melawi Regency, Sekadau Regency, Sanggau Regency and the Kapuas Hulu Regency.

== History ==
There are several small airports within the Sintang, Sekadau, Sanggau, Melawi, and Putussibau regencies, which only serve local flight routes. In order to reach distant domestic or international destinations, residents of these areas must travel through the Supadio International Airport, which is located in Pontianak. The location of Susilo Airport is in the middle of a residential area that could no longer be developed. Tebelian Airport was built as an alternative for the people of these areas to get easier air access.

The name of the airport is taken from the airport's location which is located in Sungai Tebelian district. Thus, the name of the earlier airport, Susilo Airport, which is located in Sintang City, was not given to the newer airport. Construction of the airport was started in 2013. On August 18, 2015 the first flight test was conducted to try the use of the runway. The test flight process which was carried out by Twin Otter aircraft from the airline AviaStar was successful and the plane stopped perfectly in front of the main terminal building.

== Facilities ==
Tebelian Airport occupies an area of 500 hectares. At present, the Tebelian Airport runway is 1650 meters long with plans to be extended to 2250 meters. Thus, it is expected that aircraft with large bodies, such as the Boeing 737 Series or Airbus A320 series, will be able to land at Tebelian airport. The airport is expected to be able to serve Hajj embarkation and for international routes in general.

== Airlines and destinations ==
The following airlines offer direct passenger flights from this airport:

Airlines	Destinations
Wings Air	Pontianak
