= Pangkajene and Islands Regency =

Regency in South Sulawesi, Indonesia

Pangkajene & Islands Regency Kabupaten Pangkajene dan Kepulauan
- Regency
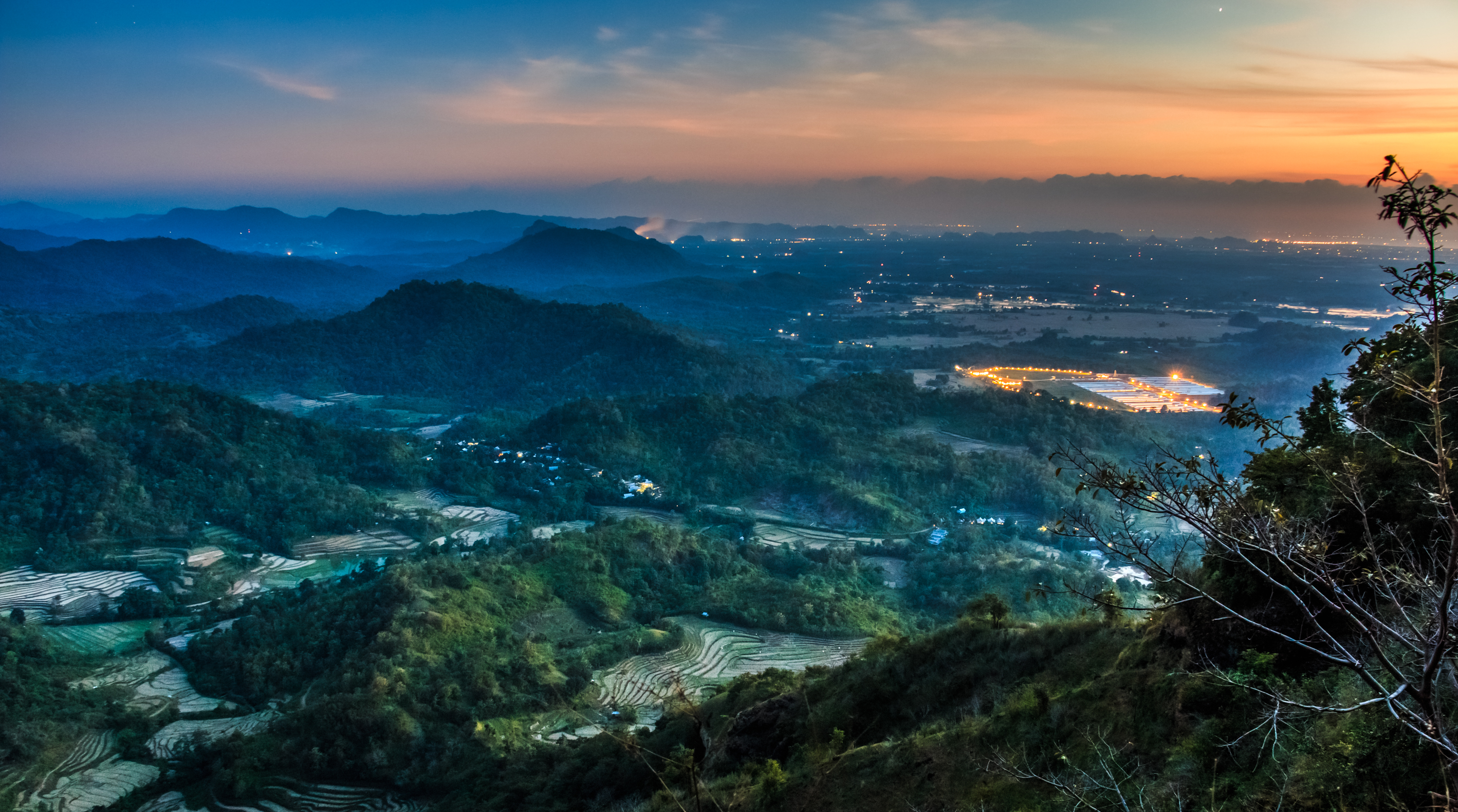
- View from Bulu Sorongan

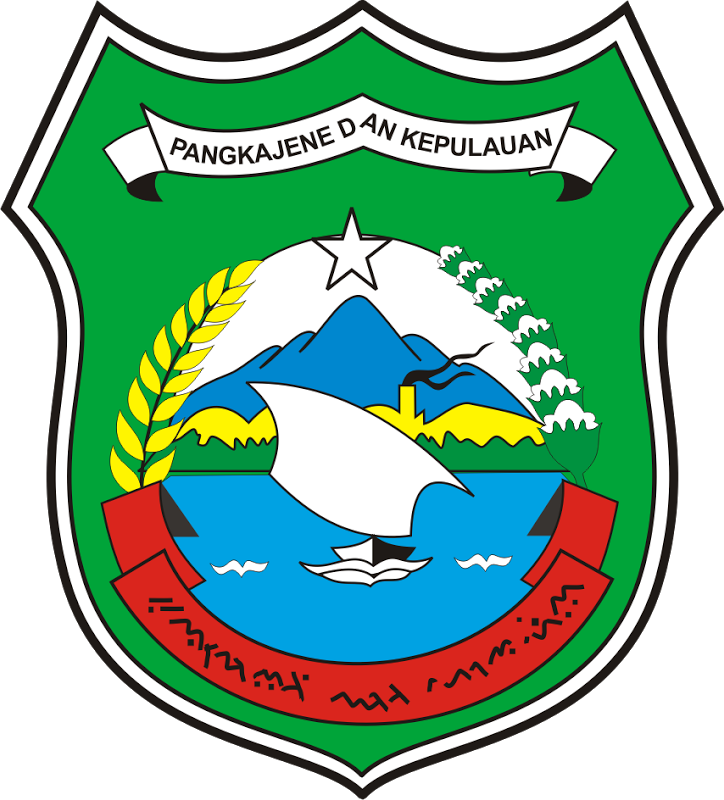
- Coat of arms

- Location within South Sulawesi

- Location within Sulawesi Location within Indonesia
- Coordinates: 4°45′S 119°30′E
- Country: Indonesia
- Province: South Sulawesi
- Capital: Pangkajene

Government
  - Regent: Muhammad Yusran Lalogau
  - Vice Regent: Abdul Rahman Assagaf

Area
  - Total: 1,112.29 km^{2} (429.46 sq mi)

Population (mid 2025 estimate)
  - Total: 365,166
  - Density: 328.301/km^{2} (850.296/sq mi)
- Time zone: UTC+8 (WITA)
- Area code: (+62) 410
- Website: pangkepkab.go.id

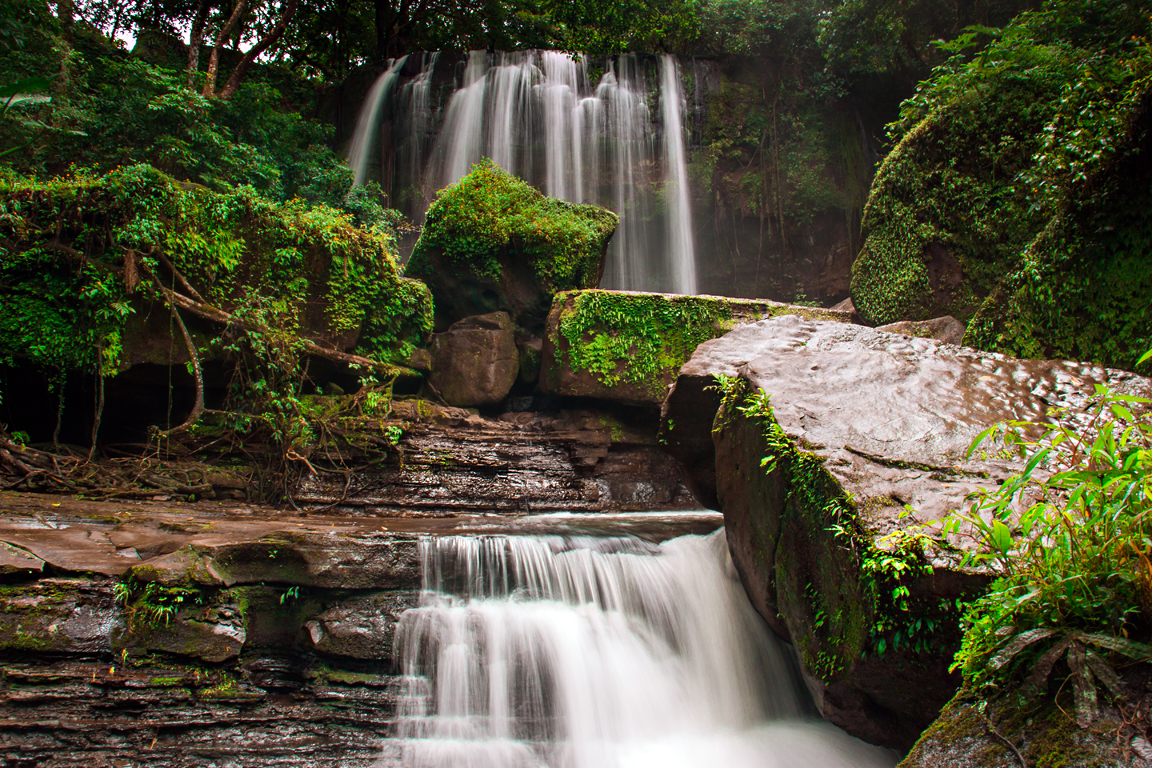
Padang Lampe Waterfall

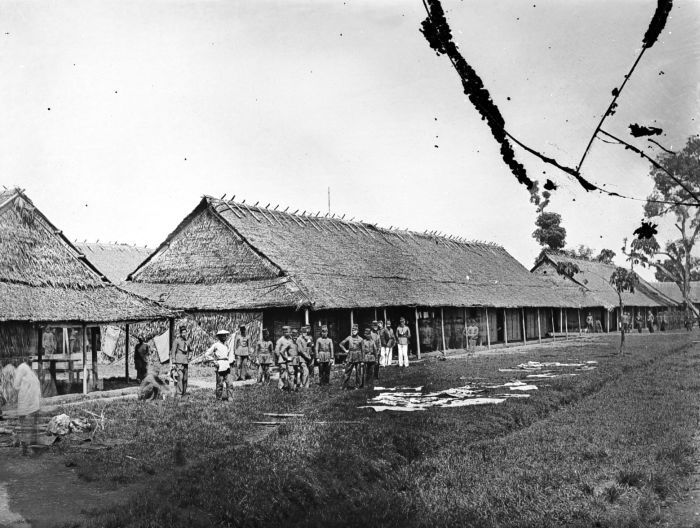
Barracks in Pangkajene (Pankajene)

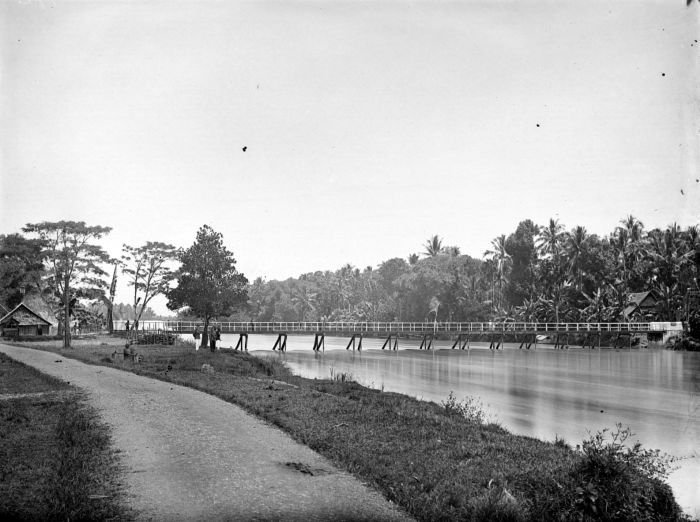
River and bridge in Pangkajene

The Pangkajene and Islands Regency (Indonesian: Kabupaten Pangkajene dan Kepulauan, usually shortened to Pangkep), (Makasar: ᨈᨀᨒᨑ, romanized: Pangkajè’ne’, Makasar pronunciation: [paŋkaˈɟeʔnɛʔ]) is a regency of South Sulawesi province of Indonesia. The regency lies primarily on the mainland of Sulawesi's southern peninsula, but also includes the Spermonde Islands (Kepulauan Spermonde) off the west coast of that peninsula, as well as other small islands further west and southwest. The principal town, Pangkajene, lies on Sulawesi in the south of the regency, and there is a series of further small towns like Lejang, Labakkang, Bonto-Bonto and Segeri proceeding northwards from Pangkajene along the Trans-Sulawesi Highway. The total land area is 1,112.29 km^{2}, and the population was 305,737 at the 2010 Census and 345,775 at the 2020 Census; the official population estimate as of mid 2025 was 365,166 (comprising 179,653 males and 185,513 females).

== Islands ==
The regency includes four disparate insular districts (the first four listed below) which together cover 115 small islands off the west and south coasts of South Sulawesi Province, with a total land area of 351.5 km^{2} and a combined population of 71,755 according to the official estimates for mid 2025. Liukang Tangaya District comprises 55 islands off the south and southwest coasts of Sulawesi. Liukang Tupabbiring and Liukang Tupabbiring Utara Districts together comprise about 50 vegetated islands and 70 unvegetated sand cays constituting the Spermonde Islands off the west coast of South Sulawesi; 43 of these islands are named. Liukang Kalmas District comprises 17 other islands more to the west of South Sulawesi.

== Administrative districts ==
The regency comprises thirteen administrative districts (Kecamatan) - nine on the mainland of Sulawesi and four comprising islands off its coast. Their details are tabulated below with their area, populations at the 2010 and 2020 census, together with the mid 2025 official population estimates. The table also includes the location of the district administrative centres, their post codes, and the number of administrative villages in each district (totaling 65 rural desa and 38 urban kelurahan).

Kode Wilayah	Name of District (kecamatan)	Land Area in km^{2}	Pop'n Census 2010	Pop'n Census 2020	Pop'n estimate mid 2025	Admin centre	No. of villages	Post code(s)
73.10.01	Liukang Tangaya	120.00	18,318	19,349	21,687	Sapuka	9 ^{(a)}	90673
	(Central Islands)	120.00	18,318	19,349	21,687		9	
73.10.02	Liukang Kalmas	91.50	12,920	14,618	16,203	Kalukuang	7 ^{(b)}	90672
	(Kalukalukuang Islands)	91.50	12,920	14,618	16,203		7	
73.10.03	Liukang Tupabbiring	55.44	16,895	17,728	19,182	Mattiro Sompe	9 ^{(c)}	90671
73.10.13	Liukang Tupabbiring Utara	85.56	12,343	13,565	14,683	Mattiro Kamja	7	90670
	(Pabbiring Islands)	141.00	29,238	31,293	33,865		16	
73.10.04	Pangkajene (district)	47.39	41,701	48,656	50,627	Tumampua	9 ^{(d)}	90611 - 90613, 90616 - 90617
73.10.10	Minasatene	76.48	32,970	38,940	42,066	Minasate	8 ^{(e)}	90614 - 90615, 90618 - 90619
73.10.05	Balocci	143.48	15,450	16,560	17,007	Balleangin	5 ^{(f)}	90661
73.10.12	Tondong Tallasa	112.20	8,637	10,099	10,385	Bantimurung	6	90566
73.10.06	Bungoro	90.12	38,851	43,879	45,930	Samalewa	8 ^{(g)}	90651
73.10.07	Labakkang	98.46	43,730	51,616	54,049	Labakkang	8 ^{(h)}	90653
73.10.08	Ma'rang	75.22	29,915	34,401	35,544	Bonto-Bonto	10 ^{(j)}	90654
73.10.09	Segeri	78.28	20,037	22,339	22,442	Segeri	6 ^{(k)}	90656
73.10.11	Mandalle	40.16	13,870	14,025	14,361	Tamarupa	6	90655
	Totals	1,112.29	305,737	345,775	365,166	Pangkajene	103	

Notes: (a) includes the kelurahan of Sapuka. (b) includes one kelurahan of Kalukuang. (c) includes the 2 kelurahan of Mattaro Bintang and Mattaro Sompe.
(d) all 9 are kelurahan - Anrong Appaka, Bonto Perak, Jagong, Mappa Saile, Pabundukang, Padoang Doangan, Sibatua, Tekolabbua and Tumampua.
(e) comprises 6 kelurahan (Biraeng, Bonto Kio, Bonto Langkasa, Bontoa, Kalabbirang and Minasa Tene) and 2 desa.
(f) includes the 4 kelurahan of Balleangin, Balocci Baru, Majannang and Tonasa. (g) includes the 3 kelurahan of Boriappaka, Samalewa and Sapanang.
(h) includes the 4 kelurahan of Borimasunggu, Labakkang, Mangallekana and Pundata Baji.
(j) includes the 4 kelurahan of Attang Salo, Bonto-Bonto, Ma'rang and Talaka. (k) includes the 4 kelurahan of Bawasalo, Bone, Bonto Matene and Segeri.

== Climate ==
Pangkajene has a tropical monsoon climate (Am) with moderate to little rainfall from June to October and heavy to very rainfall from November to May. The following climate data is for the town of Pangkajene.

Climate data for Pangkajene
Month	Jan	Feb	Mar	Apr	May	Jun	Jul	Aug	Sep	Oct	Nov	Dec	Year
Mean daily maximum °C (°F)	29.6 (85.3)	29.8 (85.6)	30.3 (86.5)	30.9 (87.6)	31.2 (88.2)	31.0 (87.8)	31.1 (88.0)	31.7 (89.1)	32.1 (89.8)	32.2 (90.0)	31.2 (88.2)	30.0 (86.0)	30.9 (87.7)
Daily mean °C (°F)	26.3 (79.3)	26.5 (79.7)	26.7 (80.1)	26.9 (80.4)	27.0 (80.6)	26.5 (79.7)	26.1 (79.0)	26.2 (79.2)	26.7 (80.1)	27.1 (80.8)	27.0 (80.6)	26.5 (79.7)	26.6 (79.9)
Mean daily minimum °C (°F)	23.0 (73.4)	23.3 (73.9)	23.1 (73.6)	23.0 (73.4)	22.9 (73.2)	22.1 (71.8)	21.1 (70.0)	20.8 (69.4)	21.3 (70.3)	22.1 (71.8)	22.9 (73.2)	23.0 (73.4)	22.4 (72.3)
Average rainfall mm (inches)	584 (23.0)	511 (20.1)	388 (15.3)	234 (9.2)	219 (8.6)	100 (3.9)	54 (2.1)	32 (1.3)	48 (1.9)	109 (4.3)	301 (11.9)	588 (23.1)	3,168 (124.7)
Source: Climate-Data.org
