= Babukung =

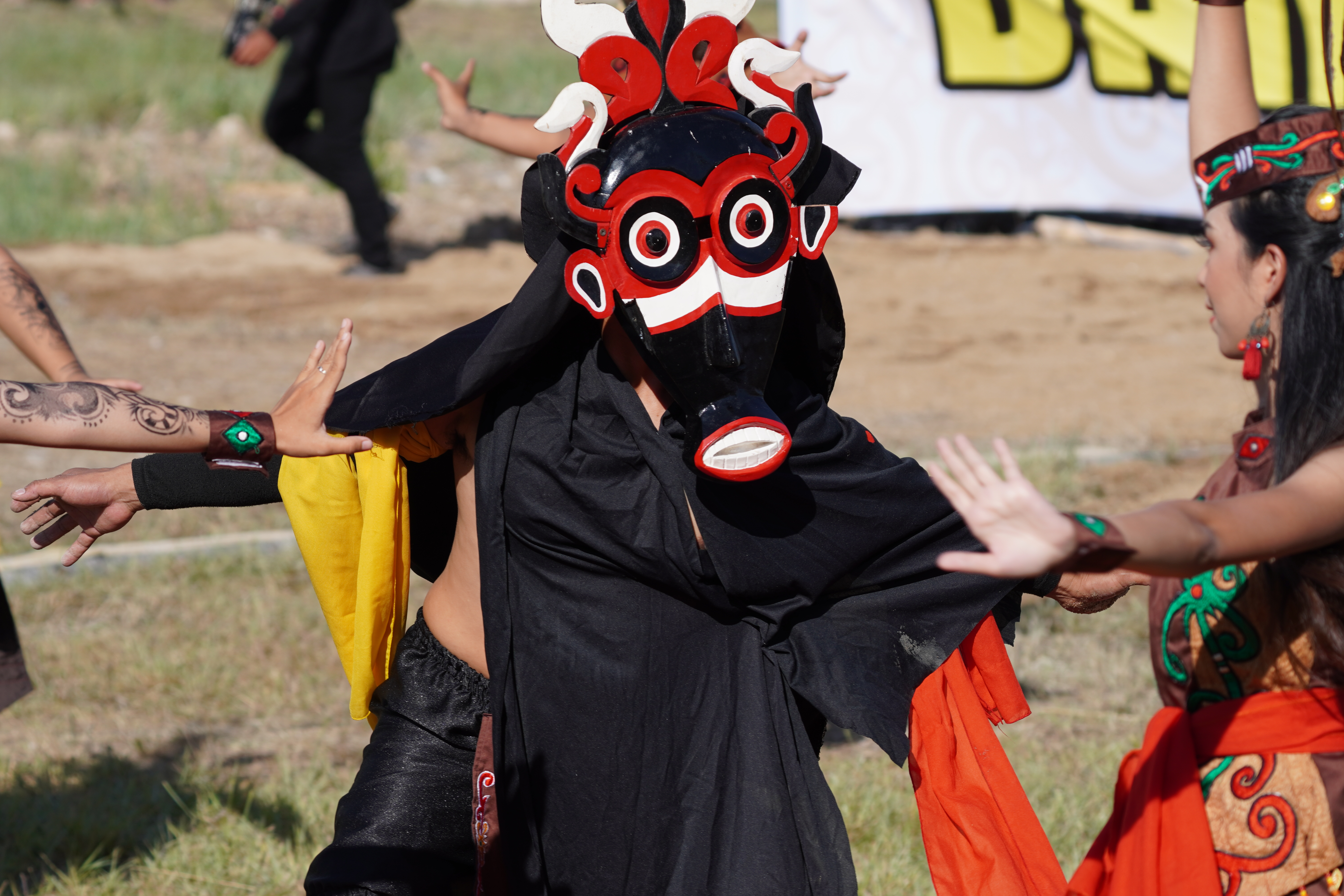
- Genre: Funeral rituals in Kaharingan religion; Mask dance
- Locations: Central Kalimantan, Indonesia
- Years active: then-now
- Participants: Kaharingan prayers (Dayak people)
- Patron: • Indonesian Kaharingan Religious Council • Kaharingan Hindu Religious Regional Council • Biggest Hindu Kaharingan Religion Council
- People: Mantir (Kaharingan's priest)

Babukung is a funeral dance ritual of the Kaharingan religion in Central Kalimantan, Indonesia. It is performed by sub-Dayak ethnic groups, especially the Tomun people, Ngaju people, Ot Danum people and other Dayak tribes who still embrace the Kaharingan religion. It came from Borneo, where it has historical and philosophical value.

== Ritual ==
This ritual is found in Central Kalimantan in the Katingan and Lamandau districts. When a Dayak practicing the Kaharingan religion dies, Bukung comes from a neighboring village or from a community group

Neighbors donate money, groceries, and livestock such as pigs or chickens.

The Babukung ritual is performed at burial ceremonies. It can also occur before burial, or during a Tiwah ceremony. It aims to dispel evil spirits in the surrounding environment so that they do not disturb the journey of spirits that have just died or spirits that have been Tiwah-ed. The Babukung ritual is not appropriate except following a death, because it is closely related to death and the spirits of the dead. If this rule is violated, bad things happen.

Several rituals are performed by the mantir (Kaharingan priest) before the dance.

The ritual varies depending on the deceased. For a highly respected person, it may continue for up to 31 days.

== Luha ==
The ritual includes the Babukung dance. The dance involvesuses a mask called Sababuka or Luha that depicts imaginary and animal characters, such as a bird, bat, butterfly, gibbon, or dragon. Each movement incorporates sacred and magical aspects.

Dancers are called Bukung.

The dance is accompanied by typical Dayak music. Each Bukung has a different accompaniment. The dance shows variations in masks, fashion, and even theatrical art.

It expresses meaning, manifests ancestral spirits, and dispels evil spirits.

Bukung Kambe (Ghost Bukung) is a luha that has enormous power and is able to catch many evil spirits.

== Festivals ==
The Babukung dance is officially designated as a cultural festival routine by the Lamandau Regency Government, known as the Babukung Festival.

The festival appears in the Indonesian Ministry of Tourism's COE (Calendar Of Event) and KEN (Karisma Event Nusantara). The 2015 Babukung Festival, which featured more than 1,000 Bukung, the record for the most traditional performances and was recorded at the Indonesian Record Museum. The dance appeared at the 2018 Wonderful Sail Yacht Rally event.
