= Ketapang Malay =

Malayic language of West Kalimantan, Indonesia

- Kayong Malay; Kayong/Kayung
- Bahase Melayu Ketapang بهاسي ملايو كتاڤڠ
- Pronunciation: [ba.ha.sə mə.la.ju ˈkə.ta.paŋ]
- Native to: Indonesia (West Kalimantan)
- Region: Ketapang and North Kayong Regency
- Ethnicity: Ketapang Malays
- Native speakers: 237,954 (1995)
- Language family: Austronesian: Malayo-Polynesian; disputed: Malayo-Sumbawan or Greater North Borneo; Malayic; Malayic Dayak; Ketapang Malay
- Dialects: Ketapang; Teluk Batang; Teluk Melano; Sukadana; Kendawangan
- Writing system: Latin (Indonesian alphabet); Jawi

Language codes
- ISO 639-3: xdy (partially)
- Glottolog: kayu1242
- Regencies and cities in West Kalimantan where Ketapang Malay is spoken by the majority of the population

Ketapang Malay (Ketapang Malay: Bahase Melayu Ketapang, Jawi: بهاسي ملايو كتاڤڠ), also known as Kayong Malay, or simply Kayong or Kayung, is a Malayic language in the Malayic Dayak lects that is primarily spoken by the Malay people living in Ketapang and North Kayong Regency (which was separated from the former in 2007) as well as the surrounding regions in the southern part of West Kalimantan, Indonesia, specifically along the Pawan River. The distinctiveness of Ketapang Malay compared to other Malay varieties in West Kalimantan such as Pontianak Malay and Sambas Malay lies in its intonation, dialectal features, and certain regional vocabulary that cannot be found in other areas. This language is divided into several dialects, namely the Ketapang, Teluk Batang, Teluk Melano, Sukadana, and Kendawangan, which exhibit differences in pronunciation systems, word forms, vocabulary, and linguistic nuances. However, these dialects remain mutually intelligible, allowing the Ketapang Malay community to communicate seamlessly with one another.

In Ketapang and the surrounding regency (including the now separate North Kayong regency), Ketapang Malay is primarily used for daily communication in families, communities, workplaces, and markets, whether in formal or informal settings. Indonesian is used as the language of instruction in official settings such as the government and schools, but the usage of Ketapang Malay persists during informal settings such as in recesses and in social interactions. It holds a high status as a regional identity symbol and fosters pride among its speakers, who often continue using it even when outside their region. It is not only used by the Malay community but also by other ethnic groups residing in Ketapang and the surrounding regions, such as the Chinese, Madurese, and Javanese communities as a daily communication language.

== Classification ==
Ketapang Malay is a Malayic language. Speakers of Malayic languages are spread from Brunei, Indonesia, Malaysia, Singapore, Southern Thailand, to the southernmost part of the Philippines. Malay is a member of the Austronesian family of languages, which includes languages from Taiwan, Southeast Asia, and the Pacific Ocean, with a smaller number in continental Asia. Malagasy, a geographic outlier spoken in Madagascar in the Indian Ocean, is also a member of this language family. Although these languages are not necessarily mutually intelligible to any extent, their similarities are often quite apparent. In more conservative languages like Malay, many roots have come with relatively little change from their common ancestor, Proto-Austronesian. There are many cognates found in the languages' words for kinship, health, body parts and common animals. Numbers, especially, show remarkable similarities.

Ketapang Malay, also known as Kayong, is classified as a Malayic Dayak lect according to Glottolog.

Ketapang Malay is one of five major Malay variants spoken in West Kalimantan, the other being Pontianak Malay, Sambas Malay, Landak Malay and Kapuas Hulu Malay. There are differences between these languages. Ketapang Malay stands out from other Malay varieties in West Kalimantan, such as Pontianak Malay and Sambas Malay, due to its unique intonation patterns, distinct dialectal characteristics, and the presence of specific regional vocabulary that is absent in other regions. Ketapang Malay is also related to the Tola language, a language spoken by the Dayak tribes in Ketapang. The two languages share similarities in their lexicons but differ significantly in phonology and morphology.

== Geographical distribution and usage ==
Ketapang Malay is mainly spoken in Malay-dominated areas in Ketapang Regency and North Kayang Regency, typically in coastal areas. In the interior areas of Ketapang Regency, Ketapang Malay serves as a contact language and lingua franca for interethnic communication. Ketapang Malay is primarily spoken in the Matan Hilir Utara and Matan Hilir Selatan districts. In addition to Ketapang Malay, the region is also home to speakers of Dayak languages, Madurese, and other Malay varieties, such as Pontianak Malay and Sambas Malay. Dayak languages are spoken by Dayak communities whose villages border these districts, while Madurese is spoken by the Madurese population residing in the area. Other Malay varieties are used by newcomers who have recently settled in the region.

In Ketapang, Ketapang Malay is regarded as an informal language, primarily used for family communication and traditional rituals. The medium of instruction in government offices and schools in Ketapang is Indonesian, as it is across Indonesia. However, during breaks and outside school hours, Ketapang Malay remains the language of choice. Similarly, in the workplace, Ketapang Malay is still widely spoken. In the market, Ketapang Malay is undoubtedly the dominant language spoken between traders from different ethnic groups. Even speakers of other languages who have stayed in Ketapang for a long time, whether consciously or not, often adopt Ketapang Malay over time. Ketapang Malay holds significant cultural value within its community, regarded as a symbol of regional identity that fosters pride among its speakers. Even when away from their hometown, speakers of Ketapang Malay typically continue to use the dialect when meeting other speakers of the language.

Ketapang Malay plays a vital role in shaping Ketapang Malay culture, particularly in traditional ceremonies and the transmission of folklore. However, over time, the growing influence of other languages, especially Indonesian as the national language, has led to significant linguistic changes. Many lexicons in Ketapang Malay have evolved, shifted, or been gradually replaced by their Indonesian equivalents, resulting in the loss of traditional Ketapang terms and vocabulary. Currently, many speakers of Ketapang Malay, especially the younger generations, are weak in maintaining their proficiency in Ketapang Malay, whether they are monolingual or bilingual. They prefer to use Indonesian and consider traditional Ketapang Malay lexicons as archaic. In the past, Ketapang Malay served as both a trade language within Ketapang and a means of communication with outsiders. However, Indonesian has now become the dominant language in key aspects of Ketapang society.

== Dialects ==
Ketapang Malay is divided into five major dialects: the Ketapang, Teluk Melano, Teluk Batang, Sukadana, and Kendawangan dialects. These dialects differ in pronunciation, word forms, vocabulary, and linguistic nuances. For example, the Ketapang and Sukadana dialects show a noticeable difference in phonetics. For instance, the letter "e" at the end of a word, when pronounced phonetically, changes to "ǝ," but when it appears at the beginning of a word, it changes to "i." An example can be seen in the word eje 'to pronounce' in the Ketapang dialect, which, when pronounced phonetically, is [ejǝ]; in the Sukadana dialect, it becomes [ije] or [ijǝ] when pronounced phonetically. The same pattern applies to other words, such as ember 'bucket' in the Ketapang dialect, which changes to imber in the Sukadana dialect by omitting the "r" sound and lengthening the "e" sound. Within these five major dialects, subdialects also exist, varying from one village to another in aspects such as tone and vocabulary. Despite these variations, these dialects generally remain mutually intelligible to one another, enabling the Ketapang Malay community to communicate effortlessly with one another.

== Phonology ==
Ketapang Malay, like many other regional languages in Indonesia, lacks a standardized phonological system. Nevertheless, many of the phonological system designed for Sambas Malay is loosely based on standard Indonesian orthography, especially the system created by the Indonesian Ministry of Education, Culture, Research, and Technology.

=== Vowels ===
Like Indonesian and Standard Malay, Ketapang Malay has six vowels. These vowels are /i/, /e/, /ə/, /a/, /u/, and /o/.

| | Front | Central | Back |
|---|---|---|---|
| Close | i | | u |
| Mid | e | ə | o |
| Open | | a | |

Notes:

- In writing, /e/ and /ə/ are both represented as ⟨e⟩.

=== Consonants ===
Ketapang Malay has a total of 19 consonants.

| | | Labial | Alveolar | Postalveolar | Velar | Glottal |
|---|---|---|---|---|---|---|
| Nasal | | m | n | ɲ | ŋ | |
| Plosive/ Affricate | voiceless | p | t | t͡ʃ | k | ʔ |
| Plosive/ Affricate | voiced | b | d | d͡ʒ | ɡ | |
| Fricative | voiceless | | s | | | h |
| Fricative | voiced | | | | | |
| Approximant | | w | l | j | | |
| Trill | | | r | | | |

Notes:

- In writing, the following phonemes are represented as thus:
  - /ŋ/ is ⟨ng⟩
  - /ɲ/ is ⟨ny⟩
  - /t͡ʃ/ is ⟨c⟩
  - /d͡ʒ/ is ⟨j⟩
  - /ʔ/ is ⟨k⟩
  - /j/ is ⟨y⟩

=== Diphthongs ===
Ketapang Malay has three types of diphthongs: /ai/, /au/, and /oi/, which are pronounced as [ay], [aw], and [oy]. A diphthong consists of two vowels that form a single vowel sound that cannot be separated. Below are some examples of diphthongs in Ketapang Malay:

- /ai/: /pantai/ 'beach', /suɲai/ 'river'
- /au/: /pulau/ 'island', /ənau/ 'sugar palm'
- /oi/: /səpoi/ 'gentle breeze'

== Grammar ==
Along with Indonesian, standard Malay, and other Malayic languages, the word order in Ketapang Malay is typically subject-verb-object (SVO). While there are notable exceptions, the grammar structure of Ketapang Malay shares many similarities with Indonesian and Standard Malay.

=== Affixes ===
In Ketapang Malay, there are several types of affixation: prefixation, suffixation, and circumfixation. The table below presents a list of some examples of affixes used in Ketapang Malay, along with their allomorphs, meanings, and examples:

| Type of affixes | Affixes | Allomorphs | Functions and meanings | Example of basic word | Example of derived word |
|---|---|---|---|---|---|
| Prefixes | N- | me-, m-, n-, ny-, ng-, nge- | Used to form both transitive and intransitive verbs. It conveys the meanings of carrying out an action or movement, moving toward something, becoming like something, and using or working with something. | makan 'eat (base verb)' | memakan 'eat (transitive verb)' |
| Prefixes | be- | none | Used to form verbs and is a transformation of the word mempunyai 'to have'. It conveys the meanings of having or possessing, using, performing an action, obtaining or producing something, indicating a collection, expressing intensive action, and denoting reciprocal actions. | kawan 'friends' | bekawan 'to have friends' |
| Prefixes | per- | pe-, pel- | Used to form nouns and verbs. It denotes a doer of an action, a recipient of an action, and the act of making something more of a certain quality. | lebar 'wide' | perlebar 'to widen' |
| Prefixes | te- | none | Used to form verbs and adjectives. It means entering a certain state, indicating an ongoing action, expressing a completed action, denoting the superlative, and conveying a feeling toward something. | dudok 'sit (base verb)' | tedudok 'to be sitten' |
| Prefixes | peN- | pen-, peng-, peny-, pem- | Used to form nouns. It conveys the meaning of indicating the doer of an action, denoting a tool, and referring to a person who possesses the qualities described by an adjective. | rawat 'to care for' | perawat 'carer' or 'nurse' |
| Prefixes | se- | none | Used to form numerals and adjectives. It conveys the meaning of indicating 'one', 'whole', or expressing sameness. | burok 'bad' | seburok 'as bad as' |
| Prefixes | di- | none | Used to form verbs. It conveys the meaning of an activity that is unfinished or ongoing, or indicating a task that has been completed. | bawak 'bring (base verb)' | dibawak 'to be brought' |
| Suffixes | -an | none | Used to form nouns. It conveys the meaning of indicating a tool or expressing a result. | pilih 'choose (base verb)' | pilihan 'choice' |
| Suffixes | -ek | none | Used to form verbs. It conveys the meaning of completing or attaching to the basic word and performing the activity indicated by the basic word. | garam 'salt' | garamek 'to add salt' |
| Suffixes | -kan | none | Used to form verbs. It conveys the meaning of making something as indicated by the basic word or placing it in a certain position or state. | penjara 'prison' | penjarakan 'imprison' |
| Circumfixes | be-...-an | none | Used to form verbs. It conveys the meaning of performing an activity or experiencing treatment with a large number of participants and being interconnected (with the basic word) with one another. | gugor 'to fall' | begugoran 'to fall one another' |
| Circumfixes | ke-...-an | none | Used to form nouns. It conveys the meaning of the basic word in a less pleasant sense or expressing something negative. | sedeh 'sad' | kesedehan 'sadness' |
| Circumfixes | peN-...-an | pen-, peng-, peny-, pem- | Used to form nouns. It conveys the meaning of the word indicating a process or expressing a result. | ngaku 'confess (base verb)' | pengakuan 'confession' |
| Circumfixes | per-...-an | pe-, pel- | Used to form nouns. It indicates a process or state related to the basic word, or it conveys the meaning of a location. | tumboh 'grow (base verb)' | pertumbohan 'growth' |

=== Reduplication ===
In Ketapang Malay, there are four types of reduplication: full reduplication, partial reduplication, continuous reduplication and phoneme-altering reduplication.

Full reduplication is a type of reduplication that repeats the entire base word. Full reduplication is also called total reduplication or complete reduplication. Full reduplication is divided into two parts: full reduplication of base words and full reduplication of derived words. Full reduplication of base words is a type of reduplication that repeats the entire base word. Full reduplication of derived words is a type of reduplication that repeats the entire derived word. In Ketapang Malay, derived words that are fully reduplicated are those with a nasal prefix. Examples of full reduplication are shown below:

- biak 'child' → biak-biak 'children'
- burong 'bird' → burong-burong 'birds'
- ngejar 'to chase' → ngejar-ngejar 'to chase persistently'
- nundok 'to bow' → nundok-nundok 'to bow repeatedly'

Partial reduplication is a type of reduplication that includes only part of the base form to create a new word. This type of reduplication consists of partial reduplication of base words and partial reduplication of derived words. It is often accompanied by prefixes. In partial reduplication of base words, the first syllable is typically repeated. In contrast, in partial reduplication of derived words, the repeated part is usually the second and third syllables. Examples of partial reduplication are shown below:

- berape 'how much' → beberape 'several'
- tangge 'stair' → tetangge 'neighbor'
- tijak 'to step on' → ditijak-tijak 'to be stepped on repetitively'
- main 'to play' → bemain-main 'to play around'

Continuous reduplication refers to words that are reduplicated and then receive affixes, or base words that are immediately reduplicated while simultaneously receiving affixes. In Ketapang Malay, there are four types of continuous reduplication: those with the circumfix be-...-an, the circumfix ke-...-an, the circumfix se-...-nyem, and the circumfix me-...-kan. Examples of continuous reduplication are shown below:

- adap 'to face' → beadap-adapan 'to face one another'
- barat 'west' → kebarat-baratan 'westernish'
- besak 'big' → sebesak-besaknyem 'as big as possible'
- bedak 'to throw' → membedak-bedakan 'to throw something around'

Phoneme-altering reduplication, also known as phoneme-variant reduplication, refers to the repetition of a base word with phoneme changes, either in vowels or consonants. This type of reduplication is rare in Ketapang Malay. Examples of phoneme-altering reduplication are shown below:

- sayur 'vegetable' → sayur-mayur 'assortment of vegetables'
- serte 'along with' → serte-merte 'immediately'
- gotong 'to carry' → gotong-royong 'mutual cooperation'
- laok 'side dish' → laok-paok 'assortment of side dishes'

In Ketapang Malay, reduplication carries different meanings. It can signify abundance, indicate frequent actions, express reciprocity, emphasize intensity, refer to numerous objects with similar characteristics, represent a collection, convey resemblance, imply the superlative, suggest risk, express irony, or denote uniqueness.

In addition, pseudo-reduplication is also common in Ketapang Malay. Pseudo-reduplication refers to words that, when observed from a morphological perspective, appear to be reduplicated, but when observed from a semantic perspective, are considered basic words. For example, kupu-kupu 'butterfly'. The word kupu in Ketapang Malay does not have any meaning on its own. So, in fact, the word kupu is a basic word that is in a reduplicated form, namely kupu-kupu 'butterfly'.

=== Nouns ===
Nouns in Ketapang Malay have several characteristics: they can function as a subject, predicate, object, or complement; they cannot be negated with adak 'not', which is used for verbs and adjectives, but instead with bukan 'not', which is used for nouns; they can be followed by adjectives; and they can be inserted with the word yang 'which/that'. There are two types of nouns in Ketapang Malay: basic nouns and derived nouns. Derived nouns can be further categorized into affixed nouns, reduplicated nouns, and compound nouns. A basic noun is a noun that consists of a single morpheme, which is a free base morpheme. Below are some examples of basic nouns:

- nasik 'rice'
- belek 'can'
- tingkap 'window'
- teluk 'egg'

Affixed nouns are nouns formed by adding affixes. The affix can be attached to the beginning or the end of other words to form a noun. Below are some examples of affixed nouns:

- nules 'to write' → penules 'writer'
- janji 'to promise' → pejanjian 'promise (noun)/agreement'
- kerje 'to work' → pekerje 'worker'
- pegi 'to leave' → kepegian 'departure'

Reduplicated nouns are base nouns that undergo repetition. These changes can be classified into full reduplication and affixed reduplication. Below are some examples:

- gunong 'mountain' → gunong-gunong 'mountains'
- rumpot 'grass' → rumpot-rumpot 'grasses'
- maen 'to play' → maen-maenan 'toys'
- bangon 'to build' → bangon-bangonan 'buildings'

Compound nouns are nouns that serve as the core of compound words. Below are some examples:

- unjok rase 'protests'
- laki bini 'married couple'
- suka duka 'ups and downs'
- terteb hukom 'rule of law.'

=== Verbs ===
Verbs in Ketapang Malay have several characteristics, namely functioning as predicates or the core of predicates in a sentence, carrying meanings of actions or activities, processes, or states that are not attributes or qualities. In general, Ketapang Malay has two types of verb forms, namely basic verbs and derived verbs. A basic verb is a verb that can stand alone without any modifications in the context of a sentence, while a derived verb is a verb formed from other words through the addition of affixes, reduplication, or compounds. Examples of basic verbs are shown below:

- makan 'to eat'
- pegi 'to go'
- diam 'to stay'
- dudok 'to sit'

Examples of derived verbs are shown below:

- lempar 'to throw (basic verb)' → lemparik 'to throw something'
- jalan 'to walk/road' → berjalan-jalan 'to walk around'
- tawak 'to laugh (basic verb)' → tetawak-tawak 'to laugh continuously'
- campor 'to mix (basic verb)' + adok 'to stir (basic verb)' → campor aduk 'to get jumbled in a disorganized manner'

=== Adjectives ===
In Ketapang Malay, adjectives have several characteristics: they can be followed or preceded by nouns, can be preceded by verbs, and can express degrees of comparison. Adjectives are categorized into monomorphemic and polymorphemic types. Monomorphemic adjectives consist of a single free morpheme and function as basic adjectives, while polymorphemic adjectives are compound adjectives formed by the combination of two or more free morphemes. Examples of monomorphemic adjectives are shown below:

- gembira 'happy'
- sibok 'busy'
- paet 'bitter'
- alus 'soft'

Examples of polymorphemic adjectives are shown below:

- butak hurop 'illiterate' (literally: blind letter)
- basak mulot 'loud-mouthed' (literally: big mouth)
- baek ati 'kind-hearted' (literally: good heart)
- kəcik ati 'timid' (literally: small heart)

=== Pronouns ===
The characteristics of pronouns in Ketapang Malay are that pronouns can occupy the positions of subject, predicate, and object. In Ketapang Malay, there are personal, demonstrative, and interrogative pronouns.

==== Personal pronouns ====
Personal pronouns in the Ketapang Malay are classified into first, second, and third-person pronouns. These pronouns can be either singular or plural. The table below shows some examples of commonly used personal pronouns in Ketapang Malay:

| Person | Singular | Plural | | |
| Person | Singular | Neutral | Exclusive | Inclusive |
|---|---|---|---|---|
| 1st person | saye, ku/aku, | | kamek, kami | kite |
| 2nd person | kau, kamu | kalian | | |
| 3rd person | die, ne, nte/ente | sidak, orang die | | |

The word ente (3rd person singular personal pronoun) is borrowed from the Arabic word أنتَ (anta).

==== Demonstrative pronouns ====
Demonstrative pronouns in Ketapang Malay can be categorized into general demonstrative pronouns and locative demonstrative pronouns. Examples of general demonstrative pronouns are shown below:

- inen 'this'
- nan 'that'

Examples of locative demonstrative pronouns are shown below:

- senek 'here'
- sian 'there' (close)
- senun 'there' (far)

==== Interrogative pronouns ====
Below are examples of interrogative pronouns in Ketapang Malay:

- siape 'who'
- ape 'what'
- mane 'where' (general)
- dimane 'where' (specific)
- kemane 'go where?'
- dari mane 'from where?'
- bila 'if'
- bagaimane/gimane 'how'
- berape 'how much'

=== Function words ===
Function words in Ketapang Malay cannot take affixes and carry only grammatical meaning. Function words consist of prepositions and particles.

Prepositions in Ketapang Malay consist of the prepositions di 'in/at', ke 'to', and dari 'from'. For example:

- di senek 'over here'
- ke sian 'to there' (close)
- dari senun 'from there' (far)

Particles in Ketapang Malay consists of -am and ak. These particles are used to emphasize, command, or form questions. For example:

- siape am 'who is it?'
- guru saye ak 'my teacher'

== Vocabulary ==
Like other languages in Indonesia, Ketapang Malay has been significantly influenced with standard Indonesian, Indonesia's national language. Many traditional terms and vocabulary in Ketapang Malay have gradually been replaced by Indonesian terms. In addition, Ketapang Malay has absorbed some loanwords from Arabic, primarily due to the impact of Islam. This is evident in terms such as ente 'you'. Below are examples of commonly used Ketapang Malay vocabulary along with their Indonesian and English translations:

=== Numerals ===
| Number | Ketapang Malay | Indonesian | English |
|---|---|---|---|
| 1 | satu | satu | one |
| 2 | duak | dua | two |
| 3 | tige | tiga | three |
| 4 | empat | empat | four |
| 5 | limak | lima | five |
| 6 | enam | enam | six |
| 7 | tujoh | tujuh | seven |
| 8 | lapan | delapan | eight |
| 9 | sembilan | sembilan | nine |
| 10 | sepuloh | sepuluh | ten |
| 11 | sebelas | sebelas | eleven |
| 20 | duak puloh | dua puluh | twenty |
| 50 | limak puloh | lima puluh | fifty |
| 100 | seratos | seratus | one hundred |
| 500 | limak ratos | lima ratus | five hundred |
| 1000 | seribu | seribu | one thousand |
| 5000 | limak ribu | lima ribu | five thousand |
| 100,000 | seratos ribu | seratus ribu | one hundred thousand |
| 1,000,000 | sejuta, satu juta | sejuta, satu juta | one million |

=== Directions ===
| Ketapang Malay | Indonesian | English |
|---|---|---|
| inen | ini | this |
| nan | itu | that |
| senek | sini | here |
| sian | situ | there (close) |
| senun | sana | there (far) |
| disenek | disini | over here |
| disian | disitu | over there (close) |
| disenun | disana | over there (far) |
| kiri' | kiri | left |
| kanan | kanan | right |
| atas | atas | up |
| bawah | bawah | down |
| utare | utara | north |
| selatan | selatan | south |
| timor | timur | east |
| barat | barat | west |

=== Personal pronouns ===
| Ketapang Malay | Indonesian | English |
|---|---|---|
| saye, kamek | aku, saya | I, me |
| kau, mpuk, ika', ikam | kamu, engkau | you (singular) |
| die | dia | he/she |
| kamik | kami | we (exclusive) |
| kitak, kulak, mika' | kalian | you (plural) |
| kite | kita | we (inclusive) |
| sidak, urang die | mereka | they/them |

=== Interrogatives pronouns ===
| Ketapang Malay | Indonesian | English |
|---|---|---|
| siape | siapa | who |
| ape | apa | what |
| ape | kenapa, mengapa | why |
| mane | mana, dimana | where |
| kapan, sebile | kapan | when |
| bagaimane | gimana, bagaimana | how |
| berape | berapa | how much |
| bile | bila, apabila, kalau | if |

=== Nouns ===
| Ketapang Malay | Indonesian | English |
|---|---|---|
| aik | air | water |
| pokok | pohon | tree |
| sungai | sungai | river |
| laot | laut | sea |
| utan | hutan | forest |
| pantai | pantai | beach |
| lelaki | pria, laki-laki | man |
| betinak | wanita, perempuan | woman |
| tanah | tanah | land, ground, soil |
| gunong | gunung | mountain |
| paser | pasir | sand |
| rumpot | rumput | grass |
| jalan | jalan | road |
| kude | kuda | horse |
| asuk, anjeng | anjing | dog |
| anak, biyak | anak | child, kid |
| mobil, oto | mobil | car |
| daon | daun | leaf |
| kulet | kulit | skin |
| ekok | ekor | tail |
| telinge | telinga | ear |
| kepalak | kepala | head |
| leher | leher | neck |
| ati | hati | heart |
| mulot | mulut | mouth |
| idong | hidung | nose |
| tingkap, lelongop, lelongkang | jendela | window |
| lawang | pintu | door |

=== Verbs ===
| Ketapang Malay | Indonesian | English |
|---|---|---|
| makan | makan | eat |
| minom | minum | drink |
| kejar, becicak | lari | run |
| basuk | basuh, cuci | wash |
| kereje | kerja | to work |
| diri | berdiri | to stand |
| gambar | gambar | to draw (a picture) |
| terbang | terbang | to fly |
| lihat, tengok | lihat | see |
| bayar | bayar | pay |
| bermaen | bermain | to play |
| ambik | ambil | take |
| beli | beli | buy |
| bangon | bangun | to wake up |
| tiduk | tidur | to sleep |
| pegi | pergi | to go |
| berek | beri, kasih | to give |
| tapok | sembunyi | to hide |
| maok, nak | mau | to want |
| mancing, ngael | memancing | fishing |
| tulong | tolong | help |
| tulak, tolak | dorong, menolak | push, reject |

=== Adjectives ===
| Ketapang Malay | Indonesian | English |
|---|---|---|
| misken | miskin | poor |
| kaye | kaya | rich |
| bagos, baek | bagus, baik | good |
| burok | buruk | bad |
| jahat | jelek, jahat | bad, wicked |
| lebar | lebar | wide |
| sempit | sempit | narrow |
| jangak | cantik | pretty |
| sedeh | sedih | sad |
| besak | besar, luas | big, large |
| kecik, alus | kecil | small |
| panas | panas | hot |
| sejok | dingin, sejuk | cold |
| paet | pahit | bitter |
| manes | manis | sweet |
| masin | asin | salty |
| gelap | gelap | dark |
| berat | berat | heavy |
| kereng | kering | dry |
| lamak | lama | long (time), old |
| baru | baru | new |
| lapar | lapar | hungry |
| dahage | haus | thirsty |
| saket | sakit | sick |
| berseh | bersih | clean |
| kotor | kotor | dirty |
| lejuk | bosan | bored |
| sawan | cemas | anxious |
| beturak | banyak | many |
| uyuh | susah | difficult |
| mudah | mudah | easy |
| berunyak, bemamai | ngomel | grumble |
| manas | marah | angry |
| leteh, lelak | capek, letih | tired |
| kepak | sia-sia | useless |
| tue, tuak | tua | old |
| mude, mudak | muda | young |

== Writing system ==
Like other Malay varieties, Ketapang Malay was historically written in the Jawi script. This script was traditionally used in Ketapang to record Malay literature, including mantras, Islamic manuscripts, and other written works. In addition, the Jawi script was used to write local songs and traditional syair, a form of classical Malay poetry composed of four-line stanzas with a consistent rhyme scheme. This poetic form, commonly used in Ketapang and other parts of the Malay world, is typically employed for storytelling, rituals, religious teachings, and moral lessons.

The origins of syair can be traced back to Arab traders from the Arabian Peninsula, who introduced it as they traveled through Aceh before spreading it across Indonesia in the 13th century. Initially, syair served as a means to propagate Islam through trade and preaching. The traders first introduced Islam to Malay royal courts, then to extended families, and eventually, it spread more widely. Because of this, syair is also known as Syi’ar (شِعَار), an Arabic term meaning "conveyance" or "proclamation." In West Kalimantan, the first Muslim traders arrived at the Tanjungpura Kingdom, which is now Ketapang Regency. There, Arab traders introduced Islam to the royal family, marking the beginning of the region’s growing openness to the outside world and the adoption of literacy and writing. This cultural exchange attracted poets and literary figures from neighboring countries, leading to the composition of syair, which was then recorded using the Jawi script in the Malay language on paper or other available materials of the time.

However, as in other parts of the Malay world, the use of Jawi declined with European colonization and the introduction of the Latin script. Today, Jawi is rarely used in daily communication and is primarily reserved for cultural and religious purposes in Ketapang.

== Bibliography ==
- Damayanti, Wahyu; Kurniati, Ai (2004). Sistem Perulangan Bahasa Melayu Ketapang [Reduplication System in Ketapang Malay] (PDF) (in Indonesian). Jakarta: Language Development and Cultivation Center, Department of Education and Culture.
- Damayanti, Wahyu; Hijriah, Amanah; Herawati, Ida; WinaIti, Eka (2010). Kamus Melayu Ketapang - Indonesia (A - M) [Ketapang Malay - Indonesian Dictionary (A-M)] (PDF) (in Indonesian). Pontianak: Language Center, Department of National Education.
- Martina; Irmayani (2004). Sistem Sapaan Bahasa Melayu Ketapang [Addressing System of Ketapang Malay] (PDF) (in Indonesian). Jakarta: Language Center, Department of National Education. ISBN 979-685-441-4.
- Sulissusiawan, Ahadi; Effendi, Chainl; Sonlie; Yunus, Muhammad (1998). Struktur Bahasa Melayu Dialek Ketapang [Structure of Ketapang Malay] (PDF) (in Indonesian). Jakarta: Language Development and Cultivation Center, Department of Education and Culture. ISBN 979-459-829-1.
