= Pontianak Malay =

Austronesian language of Borneo

- Bahase Melayu Pontianak بهاس ملايو ڤونتيانق
- Pronunciation: [baˈha.sə mə.la.ju pon.ti.ˈa.naʔ]
- Native to: Indonesia (West Kalimantan)
- Region: Pontianak, Kubu Raya and Mempawah
- Ethnicity: Pontianak Malays
- Native speakers: (undated figure of 280,000)
- Language family: Austronesian: Malayo-Polynesian; Malayo-Sumbawan; Malayic; Pontianak Malay
- Writing system: Latin (Indonesian alphabet); Jawi

Language codes
- ISO 639-3: (covered by zlm)
- Glottolog: None
- Regencies and cities in West Kalimantan where Pontianak Malay is spoken by the majority of the population

Pontianak Malay (Pontianak Malay: Bahase Melayu Pontianak, Jawi: بهاس ملايو ڤونتيانق) is a Malayic language primarily spoken by the Malay people in Pontianak and the surrounding areas in West Kalimantan, Indonesia. It is also widely spoken in neighboring regencies, including Kubu Raya and Mempawah, both of which were historically part of the now-dissolved Pontianak Regency. Pontianak Malay was also the primary language of the Pontianak Sultanate, a Malay state that once governed the area now known as Pontianak. In these regions, Pontianak Malay is not limited to being spoken exclusively by the Malay community. It functions as a lingua franca alongside standard Indonesian, enabling communication among the diverse ethnic groups in the area. However, the use of Pontianak Malay faces a slight threat as many speakers are gradually shifting to Indonesian, the national language.

Pontianak Malay is more closely related to the Malay dialects spoken in Peninsular Malaysia and the Riau Islands than to other Bornean Malay dialects, such as Sambas Malay, or Sarawak Malay, spoken in Sarawak, Malaysia. Elements from Johor–Riau Malay, Chinese, standard Indonesian, and various Dayak languages as well as many localism can be seen in the language, reflecting the various ethnic origins residing in the city. Although Pontianak is relatively homogeneous, some regional dialects are notable. The Malay varieties spoken in Pontianak, Kubu Raya, and Mempawah differ slightly from each other, especially in terms of vocabulary and phonology.

== Classification ==
Pontianak Malay is one of the three major varieties of Malayic languages spoken in West Kalimantan, the others being Sambas Malay to the north and Ketapang Malay to the south. Speakers of Malayic languages are spread from Brunei, Indonesia, Malaysia, Singapore, Southern Thailand, to the southernmost part of the Philippines. Malay is a member of the Austronesian family of languages, which includes languages from Taiwan, Southeast Asia, and the Pacific Ocean, with a smaller number in continental Asia. Malagasy, a geographic outlier spoken in Madagascar in the Indian Ocean, is also a member of this language family. Although these languages are not necessarily mutually intelligible to any extent, their similarities are often quite apparent. In more conservative languages like Malay, many roots have come with relatively little change from their common ancestor, Proto-Austronesian. There are many cognates found in the languages' words for kinship, health, body parts and common animals. Numbers, especially, show remarkable similarities.

Pontianak Malay shows more similarity with Johor–Riau Malay spoken in Peninsular Malaysia and the Riau Islands as compared to other Malay dialects spoken in Borneo such as Sambas Malay, Sarawak Malay, and Brunei Malay. Along with Berau Malay, Banjarese, and Kutainese, these languages are often classified as Coastal Borneo languages. The differences with Pontianak Malay and Sambas Malay mostly lies in vocabulary and phonology. For example, the differences between Pontianak Malay and Sambas Malay are particularly evident when comparing the two vowels /e/, which are pronounced differently by speakers of Sambas Malay and Pontianak Malay. In the same syllable position, the vowel /e/ in Pontianak Malay is pronounced as [ə], while in Sambas Malay, it is pronounced as [e].

== Geographical distribution and usage ==
Pontianak Malay is spoken in the lower Kapuas River Valley, where its waters flow into the South China Sea. Based on the flow of the Kapuas River Valley, the upstream geography of Pontianak Malay speakers borders the Tayan Malay and Sanggau Malay languages. Meanwhile, on the western coastal area of Borneo, Pontianak Malay borders the Sambas Malay language to the north and the Ketapang Malay language to the south. In the administrative context of West Kalimantan, the distribution of Pontianak Malay is also quite extensive. Administratively, Pontianak Malay is spoken in three regencies and one city: Mempawah, Kubu Raya and Landak regencies, and the city of Pontianak. In these administrative regions, speakers use Pontianak Malay as a lingua franca in competition with Indonesian.

In daily interactions, the majority of Pontianak’s residents use Malay. For the Malay people of Pontianak, Pontianak Malay is viewed as an expression of self-identity, a source of pride, and a vital means of preserving local culture and heritage. Interestingly, almost all inhabitants of Pontianak, regardless of their ethnic background—such as Javanese, Dayak, Madurese, Bugis, other migrant ethnic groups, and even the Malay community itself—use Pontianak Malay in their daily interactions. Like other regional languages in Indonesia, Pontianak Malay is generally regarded as an informal language, primarily used in casual or semi-formal settings such as family gatherings, with friends, or in the marketplace. In contrast, Indonesian is typically used in official or formal contexts, such as in offices and schools. Code-switching and code-mixing between Pontianak Malay, standard Indonesian and other regional languages are common.

While the use of Pontianak Malay is not yet under significant threat, many traditional Pontianak Malay terms are being abandoned by its speakers and replaced with Indonesian terms, particularly among the younger generation. In response, efforts are being made to preserve and promote the use of Pontianak Malay. For instance, the Pontianak city government frequently promotes pantun, a traditional Malay poetic form, on their social media platforms. Furthermore, in 2020, Pontianak Malay was officially recognized as an "Intangible Cultural Heritage of Indonesia" (Warisan Budaya Tak Benda; WBTB), with registration number 202001197.

== Phonology ==
One of dialect of Pontianak Malay called bahasa Melayu Serimbu.

Pontianak Malay, like many other regional languages in Indonesia, lacks a standardized phonological system. Nevertheless, many of the phonological system designed for Pontianak Malay is loosely based on standard Indonesian orthography, especially the system created by the Indonesian Ministry of Education, Culture, Research, and Technology.

The pronunciation system in Pontianak Malay stresses the usage of the /ə/, which makes it more similar to Johor–Riau Malay compared to other Coastal Bornean Malay dialects and the standard Indonesian language. Another notable feature of the accent is the voiced velar fricative in pronouncing the letter R which similarly used in Sarawakian Malay. In addition, the spoken interjection of Bah is widely used in Pontianak Malay, corresponding to the usage of language observed throughout coastal Borneo.

=== Vowels ===
Pontianak Malay features six vowels: /i, e, ə, a, o, u/. Like Johor-Riau Malay, Pontianak Malay is classified as a "schwa-variety" language, characterized by the occurrence of the phonetic schwa [ə] as an allophone of /a/ in word-final open syllables.

	Front	Central	Back
Close	i		u
Mid	e	ə	o
Open		a	

Notes:

- In writing, /e/ and /ə/ are both represented as ⟨e⟩.

=== Consonants ===
Pontianak Malay features nineteen primary consonants: /p, t, t͡ʃ, k, ʔ, b, d, d͡ʒ, g, m, n, ɲ, ŋ, s, h, ɣ, l, w, j/. Additionally, there are also six additional consonants—/f, ɕ, x, v, z, r/—which appear in borrowed words from Arabic and Indonesian. Unlike many other Malay varieties, Pontianak Malay lacks a trill /r/ as a primary consonant. Instead, it employs a voiced velar fricative /ɣ/ in all positions where /r/ is typically expected. At the end of a word, a glottal stop /ʔ/ may replace /r/.

		Labial	Dental	Alveolar	Postalveolar	Velar	Glottal
Nasal		m		n	ɲ	ŋ	
Plosive/ Affricate	voiceless	p		t	t͡ʃ	k	ʔ
Plosive/ Affricate	voiced	b		d	d͡ʒ	ɡ	
Fricative	voiceless			s			h
Fricative	voiced					ɣ	
Approximant		w		l	j		

Notes:

- In writing, the following phonemes are represented as thus:
  - /ŋ/ is ⟨ng⟩
  - /ɲ/ is ⟨ny⟩
  - /t͡ʃ/ is ⟨c⟩
  - /d͡ʒ/ is ⟨j⟩
  - /ʔ/ is ⟨k⟩
  - /j/ is ⟨y⟩
  - /ɣ/ is ⟨r⟩

=== Diphthongs ===
In Pontianak Malay, there are only two known diphthongs: /au/ and /ai/, which are pronounced as [aw], and [ay], respectively. Examples of the usage of these diphthongs are shown below:

- /au/: /məɣantaw/ 'to migrate'
- /ai/: /suŋay/: 'river'

== Grammar ==
Along with Indonesian, standard Malay, and other Malayic languages, the word order in Pontianak Malay is typically subject-verb-object (SVO). While there are notable exceptions, the grammar structure of Pontianak Malay shares many similarities with Indonesian and Standard Malay.

=== Affixes ===
Affixation, the process of adding affixes, involves attaching an affix to a base word, whether the base is simple or complex, to form a new word. In Pontianak Malay, there are several types of affixes, including prefixes, suffixes, and circumfixes.

The table below presents some examples of affixes used in Pontianak Malay, along with their meanings and examples:

Type of affixes	Affixes	Meanings	Example of root word	Example of derived word
Prefixes	bə-	This prefix functions to form verbs from other words that are not verbs. If the base form is a noun, it means possessing what is referred to in the base form or performing an action related to what is mentioned in the base form. If the base form is a numeral, it signifies a group consisting of the quantity indicated in the base form. However, if the base form is the numeral satu 'one', it does not imply 'a group' but rather 'to become.'	duwit 'money'	beduwit 'to have money'
Prefixes	di-	This prefix serves to form passive verbs and conveys a single meaning: indicating that something undergoes or receives an effect. The entity being referred to occupies the subject position in the sentence.	curi 'to steal'	dicuri 'was stolen'
Prefixes	tə-	This prefix functions to form passive verbs. If the base form is a verb, it signifies the perfective aspect (the result of an action), denotes unintentionality or suddenness, or conveys the meaning of 'can be [verb]-ed.'	buang 'to throw'	tebuang 'to be thrown by accident'
Prefixes	pə-	This prefix functions to form nouns from base adjectives. The meaning of this prefix is influenced by the word class of the base form. If the base form is a verb, it signifies the agent of the action described in the base form or the tool used to carry out the action. If the base form is an adjective, it indicates possessing the quality described in the base form or causing the quality to exist. If the base form is a noun, it refers to a singular entity, typically the one who performs the action related to the object described in the base form.	pimpin 'to lead'	pemimpin 'leader'
Prefixes	sə-	This prefix functions to form quantitative expressions from base words that are nouns. Its meaning depends on the word class of the base form. If the base form is a noun, it can signify one, the whole, or resemble. If the base form is an adjective, it conveys the meaning of being the same as or resembling.	dunia 'world'	sedunia 'the whole world'
Prefixes	kə-	This prefix serves to convert adjectives into nouns, though its use is quite limited.	tue 'old'	ketue 'chief'
Suffixes	-an	The meaning of this suffix varies depending on the word class of the base form. If the base form is a verb, it denotes an object related to the action or activity described in the base form. If the base form is a noun, it indicates something that possesses the characteristic or state mentioned in the base form.	minum 'to drink'	minuman 'drinks'
Suffixes	-iʔ	This suffix is a verb-forming suffix that conveys a command or instruction.	tanam 'plant'	tanami 'plant it'
Circumfixes	kə-...-an	This circumfix has a dual meaning: it can indicate experiencing what is described by the base form, or it can express intensity. Another, less common meaning of this circumfix is to denote abstraction.	kuat 'strong'	kekuatan 'strength'
Circumfixes	pə-...-an	The meaning of this circumfix is determined by the word class of the base form. If the base form is a verb, it denotes the act of performing an action or activity described in the base word. If the base form is an adjective, it indicates the cause of the characteristic or quality described in the base form.	lebar 'wide'	pelebaran 'expansion (of wide)'
Circumfixes	di-...-iʔ	This circumfix is used to form passive verbs. It has several meanings: it indicates that the action is performed repeatedly, that something is given, or that something is received as described by the base form.	panas 'hot'	dipanasik 'to be heated'
Circumfixes	di-...-kan	This circumfix has the same meaning with the di-...-iʔ circumfix.	lapis 'layer'	dilapiskan 'to be layered'

=== Reduplication ===
In Pontianak Malay, word reduplication serves only an inflectional function, such as forming plurals, indicating frequentative actions, or adding emphasis. Reduplication does not change the word class of the base form. For instance, if the reduplicated form is a noun, the base form is also a noun, and vice versa. The meaning of reduplication depends on the word class of the root word.

If the base form is a noun, its reduplication conveys the meaning of "plurality" or adds emphasis. For example:

- budak-budak 'many children'
- gunong-gunong 'mountains'
- tulang-tulang dimakan 'even the bones are being eaten'
- beling-beling ditinjak 'even he dares to step on the glass'

If the base form is a verb, reduplication indicates that the action is performed leisurely and over an extended period. For example:

- makan-makan 'to eat together for a while'
- minom-minom 'to drink together for a while'
- dudok-dudok 'to sit together for a while'

If the base form is an adjective, reduplication conveys that the objects possessing the described quality are numerous. For example:

- kecik-kecik 'many small things'
- cantik-cantik 'many pretty things'
- besak-besak 'many big things'

When combined with the circumfix sə-...-ɲa, reduplication conveys the meaning of although or even though. In this context, the circumfix sə-...-ɲa serves to indicate comparison. Another meaning of reduplication combined with affixes is to express indication or emphasis. This can highlight a particular quality, state, or action depending on the affix and the base form. For example:

- sejahat-jahatnye abang kite masih gamok nguros kite 'although he is cruel, our older brother still wants to take care of us'
- sekurang-kurangnye masih sampai sebulan 'although it is bad at least it will last for a month'
- tegile-gile 'to be crazy about'
- maok-maokan 'really want'

=== Nouns ===
In Pontianak Malay, nouns can be divided into two categories: basic nouns and derived nouns.

The morphological characteristic of basic nouns in Pontianak Malay is that they are typically formed from a single free morpheme. This means that basic nouns do not require affixation or combination with other morphemes to convey a complete meaning. For example:

- derian 'durian'
- budak 'child'
- tembok 'wall'

Derived nouns can be categorized into three subtypes: affixed nouns, reduplicated nouns and compound nouns. Nouns can be derived by adding affixes, including prefixes, suffixes, and circumfixes, to other word classes such as adjectives and verbs. Some common affixes used to form nouns include pə-, kə-, -an, pən-, pə-...-an, and kə-...-an. Examples of their usage are provided below:

- pə- + manas 'angry' → pemanas 'someone who likes to be angry'
- kə- + tue 'old' → ketue 'chief/head'
- pən- + gosok 'to brush' → penggosok 'brush (object)'

The base form of reduplicated nouns can either be a root word or an affixed word. In Pontianak Malay, there are no other types of reduplicated nouns besides full reduplication. For example:

- peggawe-peggawe 'village chiefs'

Examples of compound nouns are:

- buah rambot 'rambutan'
- cangkok manges 'katuk leaf'

Below are some examples of nouns used in sentences:

- budak nang cantek tu tunang Udin 'that beautiful child is Udin's girlfriend'
- ambekkan aku slawar nang baru 'get me a new pants'
- budak nang kuros tu anak siape? 'whose child is that skinny child?'

=== Verbs ===
In Pontianak Malay, verbs can be analyzed from both a morphological perspective and a word group (or syntactic) perspective. In Pontianak Malay, verbs are classified into two types based on their form: base verbs and derived verbs. In addition to classification based on form, Pontianak Malay verbs are also distinguished into transitive, intransitive, active verbs, passive verbs, reciprocal verbs, and reflexive verbs.

Base verb refers to a verb that is formed by a single free morpheme, meaning it is not derived from any other word or affix. It stands alone as the root form of the verb. For example:

- dudok 'to sit'
- mati 'to die'
- pegi 'to go'
- makan 'to eat'

In terms of formation, derived verbs in Pontianak Malay are classified into three types: affixed verbs, reduplicated verbs, and compound verbs. Affixed verbs are base verbs that are modified by adding affixes to form new word forms. For example:

- di- + gulay 'vegetable' → digulay 'to add vegetable'
- bə- + laki 'male' → belaki 'to have a husband'
- kecik 'small' + -kan → kecikkan 'to make something smaller'
- kə- + payah 'tired' + -an → kepayahan 'to feel tired'

Reduplicated verbs refer to verbs that consist of repeated words, whether they are base words or affixed words. These verbs are formed by reduplicating the base form or the affixed form of the verb. Meanwhile, compound verbs refer to verbs formed by the combination of two words or more. For example:

- ngolok-ngolok 'to tease repeatedly'
- pulang balek 'to go back and forth repeatedly'
- kulu kilek 'to and from'
- bejual beli 'buy and sell'

=== Adjectives ===
In Pontianak Malay, adjectives, like nouns and verbs, are categorized based on their forms into basic adjectives and derived adjectives. Derived adjectives are further classified into three types according to their formation processes: affixed adjectives, reduplicated adjectives and compound adjectives.

Base adjective is an adjective that consists solely of a single free morpheme. For example:

- besak 'big'
- manas 'angry'
- sejok 'cold'
- bagos 'good'

Affixed adjectives are typically formed by attaching the circumfix sə-...-ə to base words. For example:

- sə- + besak 'big' → sebesak-besake 'as big as possible'
- sə- + maok 'to want' → semaok-maoke 'as one pleases'
- sə- + panday 'clever' → sepanday-pandaye 'as clever as possible'

Reduplicated adjectives refer to base adjectives that are repeated, or in other words, adjectives consisting of a free morpheme. In Pontianak Malay, there is only one type of reduplicated adjective, which is the total or symmetric reduplication. For example:

- bujor-bujor 'straight-straight'
- jahat-jahat 'bad-bad'
- cantik-cantik 'pretty-pretty'

A compound adjective is an adjective formed by combining two or more base words. For example:

- panday akal 'quick-witted'
- makan ati 'hurt emotionally'
- besak ati 'proud'

=== Function words ===
Function words refer to words that do not belong to any of the major categories, such as nouns, adjectives, or verbs. Examples include prepositions and conjunctions. In Pontianak Malay, function words can be classified as either monovalent or ambivalent. Monovalent function words primarily serve to expand the sentence, while ambivalent function words have a dual role: in addition to functioning as monovalent words, they can also serve as other types of words, either by forming minimal sentences or undergoing form changes. Examples of monovalent function words in Pontianak Malay are nang 'with/and', yang 'which/who' and memang 'indeed'. The use of these words are shown below:

- aku nang die tu masih pupuan 'he and I are still cousins'
- yang bejalan penyabes datok aku 'the person who is walking at the back is my grandpa'
- soal nulis arab itu memang pendekar die 'he is indeed the best in writing in Arabic'

=== Pronouns ===
==== Personal pronouns ====
Personal pronouns are words that can replace individuals. In Pontianak Malay, there are three types of personal pronouns: first-person pronouns, which include both singular and plural forms; second-person pronouns; and third-person pronouns, both of which only have a singular form. The table below presents examples of personal pronouns used in Pontianak Malay:

Person	Singular	Plural		
Person	Singular	Neutral	Exclusive	Inclusive
1st person	aku, saye, kamek		kamek	kite
2nd person	kau, kamu, awak	awak semue, kitak		
3rd person	die	die, mereke		

From the table above, it can be seen that for the plural second-person pronoun, the singular form of the second-person pronoun is combined with the word semue 'all', while for the plural third-person pronoun, the singular form of the third-person pronoun is also used.

==== Interrogative pronouns ====
What is meant by an interrogative pronoun is a question word that asks about things, people, or situations that can replace the position of an object. Examples of interrogative pronouns used in Pontianak Malay are: /siapə/ 'who', /apəyak/ 'anything', and /manə/ 'where'. Here are examples of how these interrogative pronouns are used:

- siape besalah diukom 'whoever is guilty will be punished'
- apeyak dimakan 'whatever is eaten'
- mane nang kau maok? ambiklah 'which one do you want? take it'

==== Demonstrative pronouns ====
In Pontianak Malay, the demonstrative pronouns itu 'that' and ini 'this' are typically placed at the beginning of a sentence and serve as the subject. Examples of its usage are shown below:

- itu hak kau 'that is yours'
- ini mahal 'this is expensive'

== Vocabulary ==
Pontianak Malay is influenced by other languages due to the region's heterogeneous population. Some words in Pontianak Malay are absorbed from Dayak languages, resulting from interethnic communication between the native Dayak of Borneo and the Malay people living in and around Pontianak. Examples of loanwords in Pontianak Malay absorbed from Dayak are kungkong 'necklace' and jontot 'pig'. There are also influences from foreign languages, such as Arabic, particularly in religious terms, as well as Dutch. Like other regional languages in Indonesia, Pontianak Malay has absorbed a significant number of loanwords from Indonesian, to the point where many local terms in Pontianak Malay have been replaced by their Indonesian equivalents.

Below are examples of commonly used Pontianak Malay vocabulary along with their Indonesian and English translations:

=== Numerals ===
Number	Pontianak Malay	Indonesian	English
1	satu	satu	one
2	duak	dua	two
3	tige	tiga	three
4	empat, ampat	empat	four
5	limak	lima	five
6	nam, enam	enam	six
7	tujoh	tujuh	seven
8	lapan	delapan	eight
9	sembilan	sembilan	nine
10	sepuloh	sepuluh	ten
11	sebelas	sebelas	eleven
20	duak puloh	dua puluh	twenty
50	limak puloh	lima puluh	fifty
100	seratos	seratus	one hundred
500	limak ratos	lima ratus	five hundred
1000	seribu	seribu	one thousand
5000	limak ribu	lima ribu	five thousand
100,000	seratos ribu	seratus ribu	one hundred thousand
1,000,000	sejuta, satu juta	sejuta, satu juta	one million

=== Directions ===
Pontianak Malay	Indonesian	English
ini, ni	ini	this
itu, tu	itu	that
sini, sinek	sini	here
situ, sitok, sane	situ, sana	there
disini, disinek	disini	over here
disitu, disitok, disane	disitu, disana	over there
kiri	kiri	left
kanan	kanan	right
atas	atas	up
bawah	bawah	down
utare	utara	north
selatan	selatan	south
timor	timur	east
barat	barat	west

=== Personal Pronouns ===
Pontianak Malay	Indonesian	English
aku, saye, kamek	aku, saya	I, me
kau, kamu, awak	kamu, engkau	you (singular)
die, iye	dia	he/she
kamek	kami	we (exclusive)
kite	kita	we (inclusive)
kitak	kalian	you (plural)
die, mereke	mereka	they/them

=== Interrogatives Pronouns ===
Pontianak Malay	Indonesian	English
siape, sape	siapa	who
ape	apa	what
nape	kenapa, mengapa	why
mane, dimane	mana, dimana	where
bile	kapan	when
gimane, bagemane, macem mane, cam mane	gimana, bagaimana	how
berape	berapa	how much
kek, kalaw, kalo, kamile	bila, apabila, kalau	if

=== Nouns ===
Pontianak Malay	Indonesian	English
aek	air	water
api	api	fire
asap	asap	smoke
rumpot	rumut	grass
pukok, puhon, batang	pohon	tree
pasir	pasir	sand
sungai, sei	sungai	river
utan	hutan	forest
burong	burung	bird
bunge	bunga	flower
laki-laki, kelaki	pria, laki-laki	man
perempuan, bini	wanita, perempuan	woman
tanah	tanah	land, ground, soil
jalan	jalan	road
anak, budak	anak	child, kid
dawon	daun	leaf
kulet	kulit	skin
mulot	mulut	mouth
mate	mata	eye
ekok	ekor	tail
telinge	telinga	ear
kepala	kepala	head
liher	leher	neck
ati	hati	heart
rambot	rambut	hair

=== Verbs ===
Pontianak Malay	Indonesian	English
makan	makan	eat
minom	minum	drink
tidok	tidur	sleep
dengar	dengar	to hear
basoh, cuci	basuh, cuci	wash
putong, kerat	potong	to cut
bediri	berdiri	to stand
ketawa, galak	ketawa	to laugh
terbang	terbang	to fly
liat, tengok	lihat, tengok	to see
dudok	duduk	to sit
bemayen	bermain	to play
itong, reken	hitung	to count
jatoh	jatuh	to fall
berenang	berenang	to swim
piker	pikir	to think

=== Adjectives ===
Pontianak Malay	Indonesian	English
tinggi	tinggi	tall
rendah, pendek	rendah, pendek	short
tebal	tebal	thick
bagos, baek	bagus, baik	good
libar, lebar	lebar	wide
tipes	tipis	thin (layer)
besak	besar, gede	big, large
kecik	kecil	small
panas	panas	hot
dingen, sejok	dingin, sejuk	cold
jawoh	jauh	sad
dekat	dekat	close (distance)
berat	berat	heavy
kereng	kering	dry
tue	tua	old
baru	baru	new
sempet	sempit	narrow
bujor	lurus	straight
mati	mati	dead
licen	licin	slippery
kotor	kotor	dirty
siket	dikit	little
banyak	banyak	many

== Writing system ==
Historically, like many other Malayic languages, Pontianak Malay was written in the Jawi script—a modified Arabic script tailored to the Malay language—locally known as Arab-Melayu 'Arab Malay' or Pegon. The adoption of the Jawi script into Pontianak Malay coincided with the spread of Islam in Indonesia, influenced by the rise of the Malacca Sultanate in the 15th and 16th centuries and the establishment of the Pontianak Sultanate and other Malay kingdoms in the region. In the past, the Jawi script played a significant role in the daily life of the Pontianak people, being used for writing manuscripts, inscriptions, medicinal recipes, and royal correspondence, including letters sent by the Sultan of Pontianak to other kingdoms and empires.

The use of the Jawi script in Pontianak, as well as other parts of Indonesia, declined significantly following the introduction of the Latin script by Europeans during the colonial era. The colonial powers, particularly the Dutch, promoted the Latin alphabet as part of their efforts to standardize administration, education, and communication across the archipelago. As a result, the Latin script gradually replaced indigenous scripts like Jawi, which had been used for writing Malay and local languages, including in religious contexts such as Islamic texts. This transition was further accelerated by the spread of European education and the increasing dominance of European languages in official and public life. Over time, the use of Jawi diminished, particularly in urban centers, while the Latin script became the standard for written communication across Indonesia.

Currently, there have been several efforts to revitalize the use of the Jawi script in Pontianak. These initiatives include teaching students in pesantren (Islamic boarding schools) to conduct Quranic recitations using the Jawi script, ensuring the continuity of this traditional form of writing in religious practices. Additionally, efforts are being made to reintroduce the Jawi script in modern contexts, such as through the publication of magazines and other materials written in Jawi.

== See also ==
- Malay language
- Sambas Malay
- Sarawak Malay
- Ketapang Malay

== Bibliography ==
- Mecer, A.R.; Azharie, Arief; Petemus, Hanye; Lansau, D. (1983). Kedudukan dan fungsi bahasa Melayu Pontianak [The Position and Function of the Pontianak Malay Language] (PDF) (in Indonesian). Jakarta: Language Development and Cultivation Center, Department of Education and Culture.
- Kamal, Mustafa; G.H., Tri Manomo; Raz, Asmadi M.T.; Ulfah, Maria (1986). Morfologi dan Sintaksis Bahasa Pontianak [Morphology and Syntax of the Pontianak Language] (PDF) (in Indonesian). Jakarta: Language Development and Cultivation Center, Department of Education and Culture.
- Martina; Novianti, Evi; Damayanti, Wahyu (2005). Interferensi Dialek Melayu Pontianak Terhadap Bahasa Indonesia [The Interference of the Pontianak Malay dialect on Indonesian] (PDF) (in Indonesian). Pontianak: Language Development and Cultivation Center, Department of Education and Culture. ISBN 979-685-573-9.
- Astar, Hidayatul (2002). Kosakata Dasar Swadesh di Kotamadya Pontianak dan Kabupaten Pontianak [Swadesh list of Basic Vocabulary in Pontianak City and Pontianak Regency] (PDF) (in Indonesian). Jakarta: Language Development and Cultivation Center, Department of Education and Culture. ISBN 979-685-2160.
