= Tomun people =

Tomun
Tomunt, Tomuan, Tamuan
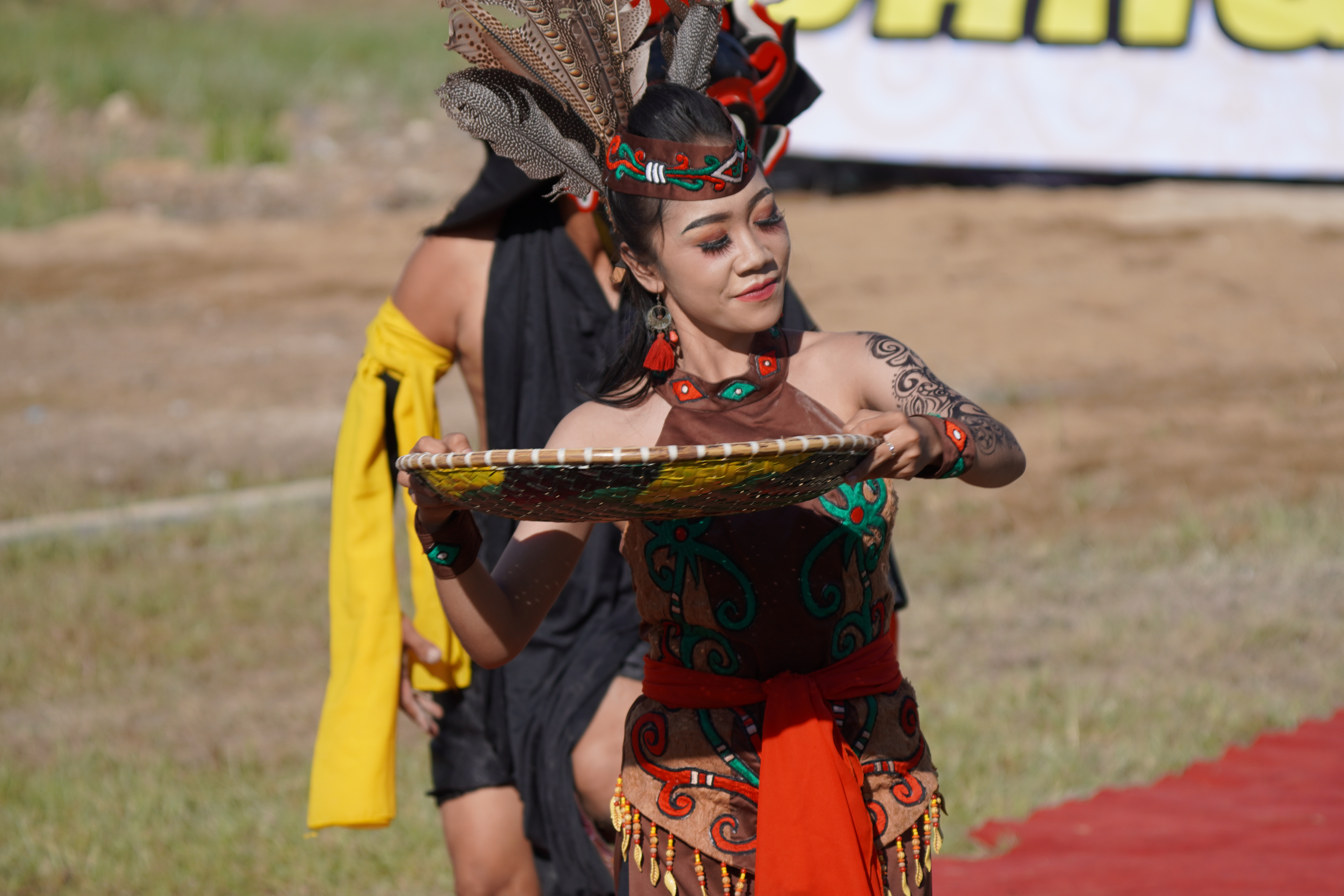
- Dance by the Tomun Dayak during Babukung Festival in Lamandau

Total population
- ±40,000

Regions with significant populations
- Indonesia (Central Kalimantan)

Location name
- Lamandau Regency (Tomun): 30,000
- East Kotawaringin Regency (Tamuan): 10,000

Languages
- Malayic Dayak (Tomun), Indonesia

Religion
- Christian (Catholic and Protestantism), Kaharingan, Islam

Related ethnic groups
- Tamuan and other Dayak peoples

Dayak Tomun people located at no. 69 (west) in Lamandau Regency, while Dayak Tamuan located at no. 69 (east) in East Kotawaringin Regency in Central Kalimantan.

The Tomun is one of the Dayak sub-tribes found in Lamandau Regency of Central Kalimantan, to be precise, in the villages bordering West Kalimantan, Indonesia.

The language used by the Dayak Tomun people is the Tomun language, which is part of the Malayic Dayak languages. The Tomun Dayak language is closely related to the Tamuan Dayak language. The percentage difference between these two dialects is 73.05%.
