= Sambas Malay =

Malayic language spoken in Sambas, Indonesia

- Base Melayu Sambas بيس ملايو سمبس
- Pronunciation: [basə mə.la.ju ˈsam.bas]
- Native to: Indonesia (West Kalimantan)
- Region: Sambas, Bengkayang and Singkawang
- Ethnicity: Sambas Malays
- Native speakers: (603,111 cited 1982)
- Language family: Austronesian: Malayo-Polynesian; disputed: Malayo-Sumbawan or Greater North Borneo; Malayic; Sambas Malay
- Writing system: Latin (Indonesian alphabet); Jawi

Language codes
- ISO 639-3: –
- Glottolog: samb1326
- Regencies and cities in West Kalimantan where Sambas Malay is spoken by the majority of the population Regencies and cities in West Kalimantan where Sambas Malay is spoken by a significant minority of the population

Sambas Malay (Sambas Malay: Base Melayu Sambas, Jawi: بيس ملايو سمبس) is a Malayic language primarily spoken by the Malay people living in Sambas Regency in the northwestern part of West Kalimantan, Indonesia. It is also widely used in Bengkayang and Singkawang, both of which were formerly part of Sambas Regency before being split in 1999 and 2001 respectively. Sambas Malay contains unique vocabulary not found in Indonesian or standard Malay, although it shares many similarities with the vocabularies of both languages. It is closely related to Sarawak Malay, spoken in the neighboring Malaysian state of Sarawak, particularly in terms of vocabulary. The border between Sambas and Sarawak has fostered a long-standing connection between the Sambas Malay community and the Sarawak Malay community, existing even before the formation of Malaysia and Indonesia. It is also more distantly related to other Malay dialects spoken in West Kalimantan, such as Pontianak Malay, which exhibits significant phonological differences.

In Sambas, Sambas Malay serves as a language of interaction and culture, not just among the Sambas Malay people but also with other ethnic groups. This means that Sambas Malay is not only a means of communication within the community but also plays a vital role in preserving cultural elements such as traditional ceremonies and folklore. Nevertheless, most Sambas Malays are bilingual, speaking both Sambas Malay and standard Indonesian. On the other hand, other ethnic groups in Sambas, such as the Chinese and Dayak, are also proficient in Sambas Malay alongside their native tongue and Indonesian. The language is also the primary language of the Sultanate of Sambas, an Islamic sultanate historically ruling the region, though it no longer holds any political power today.

== Classification ==
Sambas Malay is a Malayic language. Speakers of Malayic languages are spread from Brunei, Indonesia, Malaysia, Singapore, Southern Thailand, to the southernmost part of the Philippines. Malay is a member of the Austronesian family of languages, which includes languages from Taiwan, Southeast Asia, and the Pacific Ocean, with a smaller number in continental Asia. Malagasy, a geographic outlier spoken in Madagascar in the Indian Ocean, is also a member of this language family. Although these languages are not necessarily mutually intelligible to any extent, their similarities are often quite apparent. In more conservative languages like Malay, many roots have come with relatively little change from their common ancestor, Proto-Austronesian. There are many cognates found in the languages' words for kinship, health, body parts and common animals. Numbers, especially, show remarkable similarities.

Sambas Malay is closely related to Sarawak Malay, sharing significant lexical similarities. For instance, both dialects use words like kamek for I, pangkong for to hit, and maok for want, among others. Some studies classify Sambas Malay as part of the Coastal Borneo Malay language group, which includes Brunei Malay, Berau Malay, Banjarese, and Kutainese. It is also distantly related to Pontianak Malay and other Malay dialects spoken in other parts of West Kalimantan. However, there are significant differences between Sambas Malay and Pontianak Malay, especially in terms of phonology.

== Geographic distribution and usage ==
Sambas Malay is predominantly spoken in the northwestern part of West Kalimantan, particularly in Sambas Regency. It is also spoken in the neighboring Bengkayang Regency and the city of Singkawang, both of which were originally part of Sambas Regency before becoming separate administrative regions. The Malay dialect spoken in Singkawang originates from Sambas Malay, as does its culture. However, it has undergone some blending with Indonesian, so it is no longer entirely Sambas Malay. Nevertheless, in northern Singkawang, many residents still use pure Sambas Malay without any mixture, particularly in the Naram subdistrict, where the community remains closely tied to Malay language and culture. Sambas Malay is also spoken in Telok Melano village and other border villages in Sarawak, Malaysia, near the West Kalimantan border. The speakers in these areas are primarily descendants of Sambas Malays who migrated there. However, the use of Sambas Malay is predominantly confined to older generations, as younger residents are generally more fluent in the Kuching dialect of Sarawak Malay.

In Malay-populated settlements across Sambas and its surrounding areas, Sambas Malay serves as the primary language for daily communication. For the Sambas Malays, Sambas Malay is used as both a language of social interaction and a cultural language. This means that, in addition to serving as a means of communication among community members, Sambas Malay is also a medium for preserving other cultural aspects, such as traditional performances, ceremonies, and folklore. Most Sambas Malays are bilingual in both Sambas Malay and Indonesian. Code-switching between the two languages is common, especially in settings like markets, where people from diverse ethnic backgrounds are present. In local government offices and schools, Sambas Malay is regarded as a colloquial language and is commonly used in informal settings, while Indonesian is reserved for formal occasions. Sambas Malay also serves as a lingua franca for interethnic communication between Malays and other ethnic groups, such as the Dayak and Chinese communities. Additionally, the Indonesian dialect spoken in Singkawang, Sambas, and the surrounding areas has been significantly influenced by Sambas Malay, particularly in terms of tone and pronunciation.

== Dialects ==
The Sambas Malay language encompasses several dialects, notably the 'e' and 'o' dialects. The differences in these dialects primarily lies in the phonology. The Malay spoken in the town of Sambas closely resembles the dialect spoken in Ngabang in Landak Regency, the Dayak Nyaduʼ language, and Pontianak Malay. The dialect in the vicinity of the former Panembahan Sambas Kingdom, the precursor to the Sultanate of Sambas, located in Teluk Keramat District, is thought to have been influenced by both Sambas Malay and Javanese. This connection is linked to the history of Panembahan Sambas, established by a king from the Majapahit Kingdom who fled with his entourage from Java. As a result, Sambas Malay dialects in areas such as Teluk Keramat, Sajad, and Paloh display notable Javanese influences.

== Phonology ==
Sambas Malay, like many other regional languages in Indonesia, lacks a standardized phonological system. Nevertheless, many of the phonological system designed for Sambas Malay is loosely based on standard Indonesian orthography, especially the system created by the Indonesian Ministry of Education, Culture, Research, and Technology.

=== Vowels ===
Like Indonesian and Standard Malay, Sambas Malay has six vowels. These vowels are /i/, /e/, /ə/, /a/, /u/, and /o/,

	Front	Central	Back
Close	i		u
Mid	e	ə	o
Open		a	

Notes:

- In writing, /e/ and /ə/ are both represented as ⟨e⟩. Although, /e/ is sometimes specified as ⟨é⟩.

=== Consonants ===
Sambas Malay has 19 consonants.

		Labial	Dental	Alveolar	Postalveolar	Velar	Glottal
Nasal		m		n	ɲ	ŋ	
Plosive/ Affricate	voiceless	p		t	t͡ʃ	k	ʔ
Plosive/ Affricate	voiced	b		d	d͡ʒ	ɡ	
Fricative	voiceless			s			h
Fricative	voiced						
Approximant		w		l	j		
Trill				r			

Notes:

In writing, the following phonemes are represented as thus:

- /ŋ/ is ⟨ng⟩
- /ɲ/ is ⟨ny⟩
- /t͡ʃ/ is ⟨c⟩
- /d͡ʒ/ is ⟨j⟩
- /ʔ/ is ⟨k⟩
- /j/ is ⟨y⟩

=== Diphthongs ===
In Sambas Malay, there are three diphthongs: /ai/, /au/, and /oi/, which are pronounced as [ay], [aw], and [oy], respectively. Examples of the usage of these diphthongs are shown below:

- /ai/: pandai 'smart'
- /au/: wau 'kite'
- /oi/: tanggoi 'hat'

== Grammar ==
Along with Indonesian, standard Malay, and other Malayic languages, the word order in Sambas Malay is typically subject-verb-object (SVO). While there are notable exceptions, the grammar structure of Sambas Malay shares many similarities with Indonesian and Standard Malay.

=== Affixes ===
Affixation, or the process of adding affixes, refers to attaching an affix to a base word, whether it is a simple or complex form, to create a new word. In Sambas Malay, there are several types of affixation: prefixation, suffixation, and circumfixation.

The table below presents a list of affixes used in Sambas Malay, along with their allomorphs, meanings, and examples:

Type of affixes	Affixes	Allomorphs	Meanings	Example of root word	Example of derived word
Prefixes	bé-	bél-, bér-	Expressing possession, performing an action, indicating usage, producing or emitting something, denoting reciprocity, calling or naming, indicating a collective, describing a state or condition, marking intransitivity, and expressing reflexive actions.	bini 'wife'	bébini 'to have a wife'
Prefixes	mé-	mém-, mén-, méng-, mény	Performing an action (or movement), making or producing something, moving towards a direction, becoming or acting in a way described by the root word, resembling what is described in the root word, commemorating a particular event, performing an action as described in the root word, doing work with an instrument or tool mentioned in the root word, and creating or producing something as described in the root word.	laot 'sea'	mélaot 'to go to the sea'
Prefixes	pé-	pém-, pén-, péng-, pény-	Someone who performs or habitually performs an action, a tool or instrument used to carry out an action, someone who frequently or habitually engages in an activity, someone or something possessing the qualities described by the root word, and someone or something that causes or creates a particular outcome.	minom 'to drink'	péminom 'drinker'
Prefixes	di-	none	Formation of passive verbs.	sapu 'broom'	disapu 'to be swept'
Prefixes	ké-	none	Denotes "the one being..." and numerals indicating sequence or grouping.	limak 'five'	kélimak 'fifth'
Prefixes	té-	none	Denotes an action that has been completed, an action that continues, an action occurring unintentionally, the ability to do something ("can be..."), or an action done repeatedly or to an intense degree.	gantong 'hanging'	tégantong 'is hanging'
Prefixes	sé-	none	Indicating "something," expressing "togetherness," denoting "entirety," referring to "a single time (simultaneously)," signifying "similarity or resemblance," and representing "a certain amount or quantity."	kampong 'village'	sékampong 'the whole village'
Suffixes	-an	none	Denote the result or outcome of an action or refer to something "being" or "having been" as described in the root word. The suffix also conveys notions of entirety or collectiveness, resemblance, and the possession of a quality mentioned in the root word.	maén 'to play'	maénan 'toys'
Suffixes	-ék	none	Indicating a place or direction where the object of the sentence signifies a specific location or target, denoting the act of giving or causing something and implying that an action leads to a particular outcome. It also suggests that an activity is repetitive or involves multiple participants and conveys the idea of removing or discarding what is referenced in the root word.	tanyé 'to ask'	nanyaék 'to ask someone'
Suffixes	-kan	none	Denoting the act of creating, causing, or making something, as well as indicating the use of something as a tool or performing an action on behalf of someone else.	kacék 'small'	kacékkan 'to make something smaller'
Circumfixes	pé-...-an	pém-, pén-, péng-, pény-	Formation of nouns from root words.	carék 'to find'	péncarékan 'findings'
Circumfixes	ké-...-an	none	Express a state or condition, indicate being affected by or experiencing something, denote an action performed unintentionally, or signify an excessive degree of something.	hujan 'rain'	kéhujanan 'caught in the rain'

=== Reduplication ===
In Sambas Malay, reduplication is categorized into three types: total reduplication, affixed reduplication, and pseudo-reduplication. Total reduplication involves the complete repetition of the root word without any addition of affixes or alteration in form. Affixed reduplication occurs when the root word is repeated along with the addition of affixes, which may appear at the beginning, middle, or end of the word. This type is further divided into full and partial reduplication. In full reduplication, the entire word, including its affixes, is repeated. In contrast, partial reduplication repeats only the root word, excluding the affix. Lastly, pseudo-reduplication refers to the repetition of words that lack a true root word or whose meaning changes when not repeated, often serving no grammatical function.

The meaning of reduplication becomes clearer when the repeated forms are used in sentences. Typically, reduplication conveys various nuances, such as indicating plurality, expressing actions that occur repeatedly, denoting reciprocity or mutual interaction, emphasizing intensity, signifying sincerity or seriousness, describing conditions or times (e.g., "even though"), and highlighting the abundance of entities possessing a certain quality.

Examples of reduplications in a sentence are:

- **ayam-ayam** dah békukok 'the chickens have already crowed'
- abang **natak-natak** tali 'brother is cutting the rope into pieces'
- kamék **séngantar-ngantaran** makanan 'we deliver food to each other'
- taroh ladéng **tinggi-tinggi** 'store the knife in a very high place'
- dié béjalan **palan-palan** 'he's walking really slow'
- **malam-malam** usah bétatau 'don't wander late at night'
- dukok itok **manés-manés** 'those langsats are sweet'

=== Nouns ===
The classification of nouns in Sambas Malay is determined through an assessment of word forms and phraseological structures. Nouns can be formed by attaching prefixes, suffixes, or circumfixes to root words derived from adjectives or verbs. For example:

- maén 'to play' → pémaén 'player'
- singgah 'to stop' → pésinggahan 'stopping place'
- kuat 'strong' → kékuatan 'strength'
- jujor 'honest' → kéjujoran 'honesty'

Basic nouns that do not contain affixes can be identified through their use in specific phrases. For example:

- **biak** nang kacék iyé adékku 'that short child is my brother'
- **buah** nang mudoh ndakkan nyaman 'overripe fruit is not tasty'
- **daré** nang ciramot iyé tuman Amat 'that beautiful girl is Amat's girlfriend'
- dié **péraéh** nang rajéng 'he is a diligent traveling merchant'

By attaching affixations, nouns can also be converted to verbs. For example:

- rumpot 'grass' → mérumpot 'to find grass'
- kulék 'skin' → dikulékék 'to be skinned'
- gambar 'picture' → bégambar 'to take a picture'
- cat 'paint' → ngécat 'to paint'

=== Verbs ===
From a semantic perspective, Verbs in Sambas Malay indicate actions or behaviors. Morphologically, verbs in Sambas Malay can be formed by combining root words with affixes. For example:

- tabok 'slap' → ditabokék 'to be slapped'
- garam 'salt' → digaramék 'to be salted'
- marah 'angry' → dimarahék 'to be scolded'
- tajam 'sharp' → ditajamék 'to be sharpened'

Basic verbs that do not contain affixes can be identified through their use in specific phrases or sentences. For example:

- ayahnyé sodah **makan** 'his/her father has eaten'
- umak agék **dudok** 'mother is sitting down'
- adék **tidok** dangan nyanyak 'little brother is sleeping peacefully'
- nék wan **nyuroh** kamék **sambahyang** 'grandma told us to pray'

By using affixes, a verb can be changed into another type of word such as a noun. For example:

- rabos 'to boil' → rabosan 'boiled stuff'
- jantok 'to pick' → jantokan 'picked stuff'
- tanam 'to plant' → tanaman 'plants'
- ciom 'to kiss' → cioman 'kiss (noun)'

=== Adjectives ===
Semantically, adjectives in Sambas Malay are words that describe nouns, providing information about their qualities, states, or specific characteristics. Most adjectives in Sambas Malay are in the form of free morphemes (simple forms). For example:

- garam **maséng** 'salty salt'
- també itok **pahét** 'that medicine is bitter'
- kaéng itok **lalam** 'that cloth is very wet'
- ruangnyé **basar** agék **luas** 'the room is big and wide'

Structurally, adjectives in Sambas Malay also include words that can take the form of sé- + reduplication of the root word + -ng (or nyé). For example:

- mahal 'expensive' → sémahal-mahalnyé 'as expensive as'
- maséng 'salty' → sémaséng-maséngnyé 'as salty as'
- basak 'wet' → sébasak-basaknyé 'as wet as'
- bosan 'boring' → sébosan-bosannyé 'as boring as'

In Sambas Malay sentences, adjectives can be intensified using inyan 'very' or paléng 'most'. For example:

- **tinggi** inyan badannyé 'his body is very tall'
- **lalam** inyan séluarku 'my pants is very wet'
- motornyé **mahal** inyan 'that motorcycle is very expensive'
- dié paléng **takot** ndangar kisah hantu Gunong Sénujoh 'he was most afraid of hearing the story of the ghost guarding Mount Senujuh'

In Sambas Malay, some adjectives vary in intensity while still describing the same qualities or characteristics. For example:

- japok 'slightly wet' → basak 'wet' → lalam 'very wet'
- rabék 'small tear' → rambau 'gaping tear' → badau 'very big tear'
- panéng 'a little less sane' → babang 'crazy' →gilé 'insane'

Adjectives can also be changed into another type of word such as a verb or noun. For example:

- basar 'big' → mbasar 'to become bigger'
- baék 'kind' → kébaékan 'kindness'
- kacék 'small → ngacék 'to become smaller'
- lapar 'hungry' → kélaparan 'hunger'

=== Numerals ===
In Sambas Malay, numerals cannot be identified solely by their form but rather by their semantic characteristics. Numerals in Sambas Malay are words that provide information about the quantity of objects. For example:

- satu 'one (for counting/counting activities)'
- sigék 'one (for fruits)'
- suték 'one (for other things)'
- sékok 'one (for humans and animals)'
- duak puloh limak 'twenty five (for counting)'
- limak likor 'twenty five (for information)'

=== Function words ===
The analysis of function words in Sambas Malay is based on a structural review. Unlike primary word types, function words in Sambas Malay have the following characteristics: they lack lexical meaning, do not serve as the main function in a sentence, do not undergo morphological changes, function to expand sentences and indicate the structural meaning of sentences, and show the relationships within a sentence. For example:

- ayam **nang** orék hilang 'the chicken with speckled feathers is missing'
- barék dié témbakau **garék** ditulongnyé 'give him tobacco so he can help us'
- umak **di** pasar 'mother is at the market'

The bolded parts of the sentence, nang, garék, and di, indicate relationships of difference, direction, and location. In addition to the function words mentioned above, Sambas Malay also contains several function words that serve as determiners or intensifiers. For example:

- ambék**lah** 'take it'
- rumah **di** nang dicaratkannyé 'it was the house he had always dreamed of'
- kotor**di** bajuku kanak lumpor 'my clothes are dirty with mud'

The determiners lah and di in Sambas Malay have the same meaning, which is equivalent to the particle lah in Indonesian. The difference between the two lies in their usage. The determiner lah is placed after a verb or verb phrase, while di is placed after a noun or adjective.

=== Pronouns ===
Pronouns cannot be identified based only on its form because it does not have specific characteristics. It will be discussed based on its function in a sentence. The function of pronouns is to replace a person, indicate possession, and point to or inquire about an object. In Sambas Malay, pronouns include: personal pronouns, possessive pronouns, demonstrative pronouns, and interrogative pronouns.

==== Personal pronouns ====
This table shows an overview over the most commonly and widely used personal pronouns in Sambas Malay.

Person	Singular	Plural		
Person	Singular	Neutral	Exclusive	Inclusive
1st person	aku, sayé, kolé		kamék	kité
2nd person	kitak, kau, niké, dirék	kitak		
3rd person	dié, biak iyé, bagindé	dié, maréké		

In Sambas Malay, the second-person singular pronoun kitak is used by speakers in several villages outside the city of Sambas. The third-person plural pronoun maréké is not productive, and in casual speech, the form dié is commonly used for both singular and plural. The third-person singular pronoun biak iyé is used exclusively when referring to females, while the pronoun bagindé is reserved for referring to royalty.

==== Possessive pronouns ====
The possessive pronoun is actually a type of personal pronoun that functions to indicate possession in a sentence. As a possessive pronoun, these words take a shortened form. For example:

- séluarku 'my pants'
- séluarmu 'your pants'
- séluarnyé 'his/her pants'
- séluar'ng 'his/her pants'

There is no difference in meaning between the binding forms -nyé and -'ng. The same applies to the binding form -ang. The distinction lies in the regional usage of these forms. The -ang binding form is used by speakers in the city of Sambas, while the other binding forms are used by speakers outside the city of Sambas.

==== Demonstrative and interrogative pronouns ====
Demonstrative pronouns are words used to identify or point to an object, specifying its location in relation to the speaker, listener, or a third party. In Sambas Malay, examples include itok 'this,' referring to something near the speaker; iyé 'that,' referring to something near the listener; sinon 'there,' indicating something near a third party; sitok 'here,' and siyé 'there,' with siyé denoting a location slightly closer than sinon. Demonstrative pronouns sinon, sitok, and siyé in Sambas Malay are commonly preceded by the function words di or ké, resulting in phrases like di sinon 'over there,' ké sitok 'to here,' and ké siyé 'to there.'

Interrogative pronouns are words used to inquire about objects, people, or something else. Examples of interrogative pronouns in Sambas Malay include apé 'what,' used to ask about objects; sapé 'who,' used to ask about people; and mané 'where,' used to inquire about choices involving a person, several items, or things. These interrogative pronouns can be used in sentences, either independently or in combination with function words. For example"

- apé nang kau bawak iyé? 'what did you bring there?'
- dangan apé kau pigi? 'what are you going with?'
- mané nang kau maokkan? 'which one do you want?'
- sapé nang kawanék kau pigi? 'who will accompany you in your trip?'

== Vocabulary ==
Sambas Malay has been significantly influenced by other languages, particularly standard Indonesian. Like many regional languages in Indonesia, the dominance of standard Indonesian as the national language and its role in education and professional settings have contributed to a gradual replacement of local Sambas Malay vocabulary with Indonesian equivalents. This trend is especially evident among younger generations, who often perceive traditional Sambas Malay terms as outdated or archaic. Due to the strong Javanese influence in the Sambas Sultanate, Sambas Malay has incorporated numerous Javanese loanwords, including kolé ‘I’ and niké ‘you’. There is also a strong influence from Arabic, particularly in religious terms, as the majority of the people in Sambas practice Islam.

Below are examples of commonly used Sambas Malay vocabulary along with their Indonesian and English translations:

=== Numerals ===
Number	Sambas Malay	Indonesian	English
1	satu, sigék, suték, sékok	satu	one
2	duak	dua	two
3	tigé	tiga	three
4	ampat	empat	four
5	limak	lima	five
6	anam	enam	six
7	tujoh	tujuh	seven
8	lapan	delapan	eight
9	sambilan	sembilan	nine
10	sépuloh	sepuluh	ten
11	sébalas	sebelas	eleven
20	duak puloh	dua puluh	twenty
50	limak puloh	lima puluh	fifty
100	sératos	seratus	one hundred
500	limak ratos	lima ratus	five hundred
1000	séribu	seribu	one thousand
5000	limak ribu	lima ribu	five thousand
100,000	sératos ribu	seratus ribu	one hundred thousand
1,000,000	séjuté, satu juté	sejuta, satu juta	one million

=== Directions ===
Sambas Malay	Indonesian	English
itok	ini	this
iyé	itu	that
sitok	sini	here
siyé, sinon	situ, sana	there
di sitok	di sini	over here
di siyé, di sinon	di situ, di sana	over there
kérék	kiri	left
kanan	kanan	right
atas	atas	up
bawah	bawah	down
utaré	utara	north
sélatan	selatan	south
timor	timur	east
barat	barat	west

=== Personal Pronouns ===
Sambas Malay	Indonesian	English
aku, sayé, kolé	aku, saya	I, me
kitak, kau, niké	kamu, engkau	you (informal)
dié, biak iyé	dia	he/she
kamék	kami	we (exclusive)
kité	kita	we (inclusive)
dié, maréké	mereka	they/them

=== Interrogatives Pronouns ===
Sambas Malay	Indonesian	English
siapé	siapa	who
apé	apa	what
ngapé	kenapa, mengapa	why
mané	mana, dimana	where
bilé	kapan	when
gémané, bagaimané	gimana, bagaimana	how
bérapé	berapa	how much
bilé, apébilé	bila, apabila, kalau	if

=== Nouns ===
Sambas Malay	Indonesian	English
aék	air	water
batang, pokok	pohon	tree
sungai	sungai	river
hutan	hutan	forest
pantai	pantai	beach
laki-laki, jantan	laki-laki, pria	man
pérémpuan, batiné	perempuan, wanita	woman
tanah	tanah	land, ground, soil
jalan	jalan	road
kudé	kuda	horse
biak, anak	anak	child, kid
oto	mobil	car
daon	daun	leaf
kulék	kulit	skin
ékok	ekor	tail
talingé	telinga	ear
kapalak, palak	kepala	head
tigék	leher	neck
hati	hati	heart

=== Verbs ===
Sambas Malay	Indonesian	English
makan	makan	eat
minom	minum	drink
tidok	tidur	sleep
cacak	lari	run
basoh, cuci	basuh, cuci	wash
kerajé	kerja	to work
bédiri	berdiri	to stand
gambar	gambar	to draw (a picture)
térabang	terbang	to fly
lihat	lihat, tengok	see
bayar	bayar	pay
bémaéng	bermain	to play
ambék	ambil	take
bali	beli	buy
ngéhiné	menghina	to insult

=== Adjectives ===
Sambas Malay	Indonesian	English
tinggi	tinggi	tall
randah	rendah	short
cantek	cantik	pretty
bagos, baék	bagus, baik	good
lebar	lebar	wide
sadéh	sedih	sad
basar	besar, gede	big, large
kacék	kecil	small
panas, barau	panas	hot
sajok	dingin, sejuk	cold
tarang	terang	bright
lagam	gelap	dark
barat	berat	heavy
karéng	kering	dry
lamé, usang	lama	long (time), old
baru	baru	new
lapar	lapar	hungry
haos	haus	thirsty
sakét	sakit	sick
beraséh	bersih	clean
kotor	kotor	dirty
sikét	dikit	little
banyak	banyak	many

== Writing system ==
Like other Malay dialects, Sambas Malay has traditionally been written in the Arabic-based script known as the Jawi script, locally known as Arab-Melayu 'Arab-Malay'. The Jawi script came into Sambas during the spread of Islam in Indonesia. In the past, many written works, manuscripts, and scriptures produced by Islamic scholars in Sambas were written in the Jawi script. The tradition of using the Jawi script in the Sambas community has developed over a long period. For instance, in 1811, Sultan Abu Bakar Tajuddin sent a letter to Stamford Raffles written in Jawi script. Schools established before Indonesia's independence in Sambas also used Jawi script, and it was a mandatory subject for all students. After Indonesia gained independence, however, the use of Jawi script in various media, including schools, gradually declined, being replaced by the Latin script. It is no longer used for official texts or articles in books or other forms, and is now primarily used only in street signs in certain parts of Sambas city.

Currently, the Indonesian government is making efforts to revitalize the use of the Jawi script in Sambas. The script is being taught in junior high schools throughout the region as part of an initiative to preserve its usage. Some madrasahs in Sambas continue to preserve the use of the Jawi alphabet, particularly in religious sermons and Quranic recitations.

== See also ==
- Sarawak Malay
- Pontianak Malay

== Bibliography ==
- Susilo, Firman; Sulistyawati, Rr.; Tarno, Slamet; Ramdani, Deden (1998). Fonologi Bahasa Melayu Sambas [Phonology of the Sambas Malay language] (PDF) (in Indonesian). Jakarta: Language Development and Cultivation Center, Department of Education and Culture. ISBN 979-459-827-5.
- Muzamil, A.R.; Sulissusiawan, Ahadi; Hartono; Yunus, M. (1997). Sistem Sapaan Bahasa Melayu Sambas [Addressing System in the Sambas Malay Language] (PDF) (in Indonesian). Jakarta: Language Development and Cultivation Center, Department of Education and Culture. ISBN 979-459-770-8.
- Effendy, Adam; Hijriah, Amanah (2004). Struktur dan Fungsi Kalimat Bahasa Melayu Sambas [Structure and Function of Sentences in the Sambas Malay Language] (PDF) (in Indonesian). Jakarta: Language Center, Department of National Education. ISBN 979-685-441-4.
- Trimantomo, Y.; Paimin, Suparmin; Raz., Asniadi M.T.; Umar, Mochtar (1985). Morfosintaksis Bahasa Melayu Sambas [Morphosyntax of the Sambas Malay Language] (PDF) (in Indonesian). Jakarta: Language Development and Cultivation Center, Department of Education and Culture.
