= Malayic Dayak languages =

Austronesian language spoken in Borneo

Malayic Dayak
- Delang–Kayong–Banana’
- Native to: Indonesia
- Region: West Kalimantan, Central Kalimantan
- Native speakers: (520,000 cited 1981)
- Language family: Austronesian: Malayo-Polynesian; Malayo-Sumbawan ?; Malayic; Malayic Dayak

Language codes
- ISO 639-3: xdy
- Glottolog: mala1480

Malayic Dayak is a dialect chain of Malayic spoken in southern West Kalimantan (North Kayong, Ketapang, Kapuas Hulu, Melawi, and Sintang) and the western part of Central Kalimantan (Lamandau, Sukamara, West Kotawaringin, Seruyan, and East Kotawaringin).

Wurm and Hattori (1981) list these dialects as Delang (200,000 speakers), Kayong (100,000 speakers), Banana’ (100,000 speakers), Bamayo, Tapitn (300 speakers), Mentebah-Suruk (20,000 speakers), Semitau (10,000 speakers), Suhaid (10,000 speakers), and additionally Arut, Lamandau, Sukamara, Riam (Nibung Terjung), Belantikan (Sungkup), Tamuan, Tomun, Pangin, Sekakai, and Silat. These dialects should not be confused with other Malayic languages spoken by the Dayaks, such as the Ibanic branch or Kendayan.

== Phonology ==
This section follows the description of Malayic languages specifically spoken in pre-2002 West Kotawaringin (also including Lamandau and Sukamara regencies, referred to as the KoBar languages), itself featured on a thesis by Chad K. White from 2008.

=== Consonants ===
Consonants
| | | Labial | Alveolar | Palatal | Velar | Glottal |
|---|---|---|---|---|---|---|
| Nasal | | m | n | ɲ ⟨ny⟩ | ŋ ⟨ng⟩ | |
| Stop | Voiceless | p | t | tʃ ⟨c⟩ | k | ʔ ⟨'⟩ |
| Stop | Voiced | b | d | dʒ ⟨j⟩ | ɡ ⟨g⟩ | |
| Fricative | | | s | | | h |
| Lateral | | | l | | | |
| Trill | | | r | | | |
| Semivowel | | w | | j ⟨y⟩ | | |

The northeast and northwest varieties still retain the Proto-Malayic sequence *-aba-, a feature shared with Kendayan and Iban; this sequence had lenited into -awa- elsewhere (babah : bawah 'under, below'). Proto-Malayic phoneme *h is still generally maintained in the West Kotawaringin languages, except in few sporadic instances where it had vanished (*hisəp → insap(m) 'to suck'). Some northwest varieties distinguish between /k/ and /ʔ/ (a glottal stop) similar to Iban and Kendayan, but the inheritance status remains unclear.

=== Vowels ===
Vowels
| | Front | Central | Back |
|---|---|---|---|
| High | i | | u |
| Mid | e ⟨é⟩ | ə ⟨e⟩ | o |
| Low | | a | |

Like other Malayic languages (with the notable exceptions of Bangka Malay and Betawi), all West Kotawaringin languages have merged *-əC (schwa in final closed syllables) with *-aC. However, Proto-Malayic phoneme *ə in the remaining syllables mostly turned into o (outside in the central-western cluster, where it merged with a instead): northern lomak : central-western lamak 'fat'. In the Delang variety, final *-a was rounded into -o, but this vowel retained elsewhere.

There are two diphthongs and both of them only occur word-finally, namely /aj/ and /aw/. The phoneme /e/ occurs in the varieties of Penahan and Riam, as a result of the monophthongisation from earlier *-ay (and *-aw was also affected by this process and became -o).

== Languages ==
Some of the Malayic Dayak languages that have been successfully identified and classified include:

- Arut
- Bamayo
- Banana’
- Belantikan
- Delang
- Gerunggang
- Kayong/Ketapang (Malay)
- Lamandau
- Mentebah-Suruk
- Pangin
- Pesaguan Hulu
- Pesaguan Kiri
- Riam
- Sekakai
- Semitau
- Silat
- Suhaid
- Sukamara
- Tamuan-Tomun
- Tapitn

== See also ==
- List of Dayak groups of West Kalimantan

== Bibliography ==
- White, Chad K. (2008). Genetic Inheritance in the Malayic languages of Kotawaringin Barat, Indonesia (Master of Arts thesis). Atlanta: The University of Georgia.
