= Lamandau Regency =

Regency in Central Kalimantan, Indonesia

Lamandau Regency Kabupaten Lamandau
- Regency
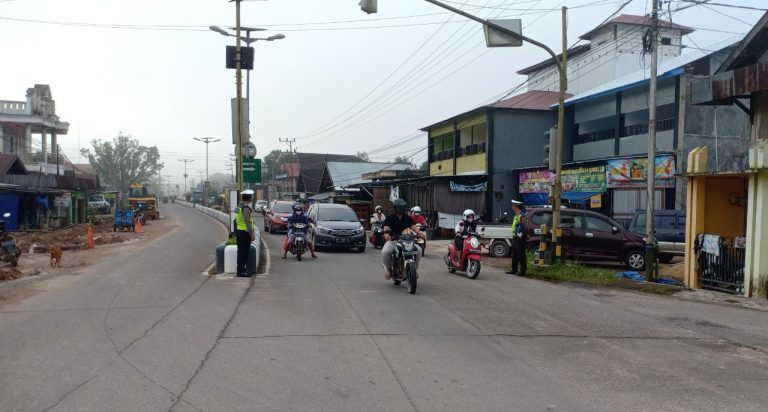
- A street in Nanga Bulik, Lamandau Regency

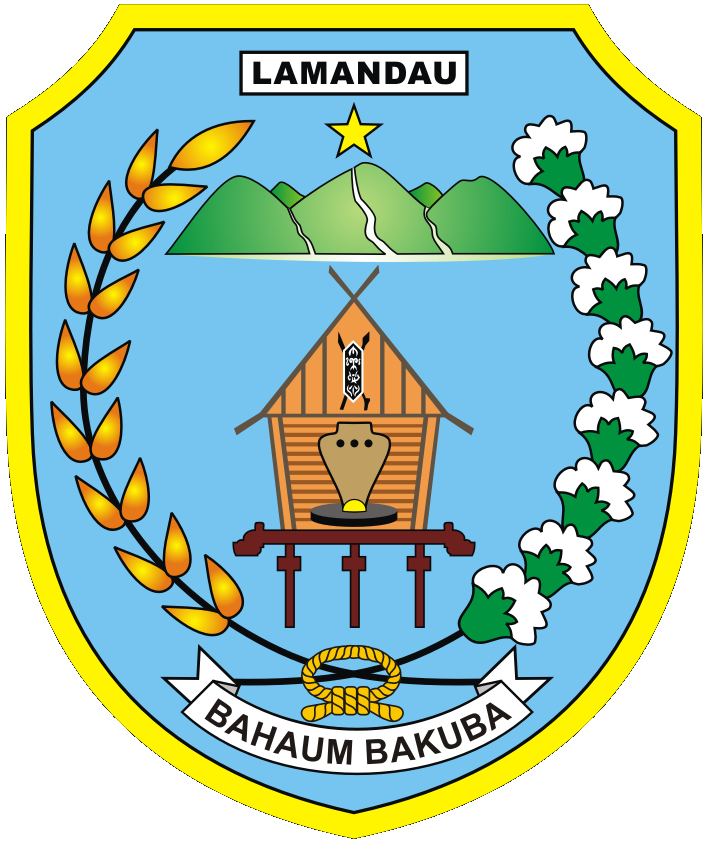
- Coat of arms

- Location within Central Kalimantan

- Location in Kalimantan and Indonesia Lamandau Regency (Indonesia)
- Coordinates: 1.8383°S 111.2869°E
- Country: Indonesia
- Province: Central Kalimantan
- Regency seat: Nanga Bulik

Government
  - Regent: Rizky Aditya Putra
  - Vice Regent: Abdul Hamid

Area
  - Total: 7,632.39 km^{2} (2,946.88 sq mi)

Population (mid 2025 estimate)
  - Total: 105,210
  - Density: 13.785/km^{2} (35.702/sq mi)
- Time zone: UTC+7 (Western Indonesia Time)
- Area code: (+62) 532
- HDI (2022): ▲0.718 (High)
- Website: lamandaukab.go.id

Lamandau Regency (Indonesian: Kabupaten Lamandau) is a regency of Central Kalimantan province of Indonesia. The regency was created in 2002 from the northwestern parts of West Kotawaringin Regency. The regency has a population of 63,119 according to the 2010 census and 97,611 based on the 2020 census. The population estimate as of mid 2025 was 105,210 (comprising 56,010 males and 49.200 females). The regency covers a land area of 7,632.39 square kilometres and is divided into eight districts (kecamatan). The regency seat is located in the town of Nanga Bulik (with just over 21,500 inhabitants), which serves as the regency's economic and administrative center.

== History ==
The area that now constitutes Lamandau Regency, centered around the town of Nanga Bulik, was part of the Kotawaringin Kingdom in the early 20th century. In 1920, it was designated as the onderdistrict of Nanga Bulik, later becoming the kecamatan (district) of Nanga Bulik by the time of Indonesian independence. In 1952, it was reclassified as Kewedanaan of Nanga Bulik, which included two districts, North Kotawaringin and East Kotawaringin. This administrative structure was dissolved in 1974, and the region was governed as three districts: Lamandau, Bulik, and Delang, under an administrative region (wilayah administratif) overseen by a regent's assistant (pembantu bupati) within West Kotawaringin Regency.

Following the fall of Suharto and the subsequent rapid decentralization, various figures and groups within the region began advocating for the creation of a separate regency comprising the three districts of Lamandau, Bulik, and Delang. This aspiration emerged during a meeting at the West Kotawaringin's office on 10 November 1999, where the division of West Kotawaringin Regency's area was proposed to establish both Sukamara Regency and Lamandau Regency. Initially, these districts were intended to be part of Sukamara Regency, but this proposal faced opposition from the three districts, which instead demanded their own separate regency apart from Sukamara. Subsequently, with the enactment of Law Number 5 of 2002, the regency was officially established and inaugurated on 2 July 2002. Later, the original three districts were divided into a total of eight districts on 1 August 2005, in accordance with Regional Law Number 5 of 2005.

== Geography ==
Lamandau Regency shares borders with Ketapang Regency and Seruyan Regency to the north and west, West Kotawaringin Regency to the east and south, and Sukamara Regency to the south. The regency is characterized by lowland swamps with rivers and streams scattered throughout. The soil composition consists mainly of podzols and latosols, which have poor water retention and absorption but are relatively resistant to erosion. Underground water sources can typically be found within 10 to 15 metres below the surface. The largest river in the regency is the Lamandau River, which branches into several smaller streams such as the Bulik River, Belantikan River, and Matu River.

=== Climate ===
Nanga Bulik, the capital of the regency, experiences a tropical rainforest climate (Af) characterized by heavy rainfall throughout the year.

Climate data for Nanga Bulik
Month	Jan	Feb	Mar	Apr	May	Jun	Jul	Aug	Sep	Oct	Nov	Dec	Year
Mean daily maximum °C (°F)	29.7 (85.5)	30.1 (86.2)	30.5 (86.9)	31.1 (88.0)	31.3 (88.3)	31.1 (88.0)	31.5 (88.7)	31.7 (89.1)	31.8 (89.2)	31.5 (88.7)	30.8 (87.4)	30.2 (86.4)	30.9 (87.7)
Daily mean °C (°F)	26.1 (79.0)	26.4 (79.5)	26.5 (79.7)	27.0 (80.6)	27.1 (80.8)	26.8 (80.2)	26.9 (80.4)	27.0 (80.6)	27.1 (80.8)	26.9 (80.4)	26.7 (80.1)	26.3 (79.3)	26.7 (80.1)
Mean daily minimum °C (°F)	22.5 (72.5)	22.7 (72.9)	22.6 (72.7)	22.9 (73.2)	23.0 (73.4)	22.6 (72.7)	22.4 (72.3)	22.4 (72.3)	22.5 (72.5)	22.4 (72.3)	22.6 (72.7)	22.5 (72.5)	22.6 (72.7)
Average rainfall mm (inches)	250 (9.8)	241 (9.5)	284 (11.2)	294 (11.6)	251 (9.9)	198 (7.8)	159 (6.3)	144 (5.7)	197 (7.8)	252 (9.9)	302 (11.9)	307 (12.1)	2,879 (113.5)
Source: Climate-Data.org

== Governance ==
=== Administrative districts ===
Lamandau Regency comprises eight districts (kecamatan), detailed below with their areas and their population totals from the 2010 and 2020 censuses, along with their official population estimates as of mid 2025. The table also indicates the number of villages in each district, their administrative centers, and the corresponding postal codes. The regency encompasses a total of 85 rural desa and 3 urban kelurahan - the latter being Nanga Bulik (with 21,495 inhabitants as at mid 2024), Tapin Bini (1,245 inhabitants) and Kudangan (1,341 inhabitants).

Kode Wilayah	District (kecamatan)	Area in km^{2}	Pop'n census 2010	Pop'n census 2020	Pop'n estimate mid 2025	Admin centre	No. of villages	Post code
62.09.03	Bulik	766.34	21,989	38,041	41,620	Nanga Bulik ^{(a)}	14	74162 ^{(b)}
62.09.06	Sematu Jaya	479.83	8,715	12,920	13,810	Purwareja	8	74165
62.09.05	Menthobi Raya	625.78	8,982	11,860	12,680	Melata	11	74164
62.09.04	Bulik Timur (East Bulik)	555.05	6,467	9,380	10,090	Merambang	12	74163
62.09.01	Lamandau	1,538.38	5,454	9,370	10,210	Tapin Bini ^{(a)}	11	74660
62.09.07	Belantikan Raya	879.65	4,321	7,580	8,020	Bayat	12	74663
62.09.02	Delang	762.00	4,866	5,760	6,010	Kudangan ^{(a)}	11	74665
62.09.08	Batangkawa	685.00	2,405	2,700	2,780	Kinipan	9	74664
	Totals	6,292.03	63,199	97,611	105,210	Nanga Bulik	88	

Notes: (a) The center of this district is classified as a kelurahan. (b) Except for the town of Nanga Bulik (postcode: 74611) and the village of Kujan (postcode: 74612).

== Economy ==
The primary economic sector in the regency is agriculture, accounting for 32.09% of the gross regional product as of 2022. This is followed by the processing industry at 15.01%, mining at 13.27%, and construction at 10.80%. The total value of the regency's gross regional product in 2022 was 4.225 trillion rupiah. The annual economic growth for the same year stood at 6.45%, indicating signs of recovery from the previous decline during the COVID-19 pandemic. The processing industry experienced the highest growth rate at 13.13%, followed by the telecommunication sector at 10.01%.

=== Agriculture and fishery ===
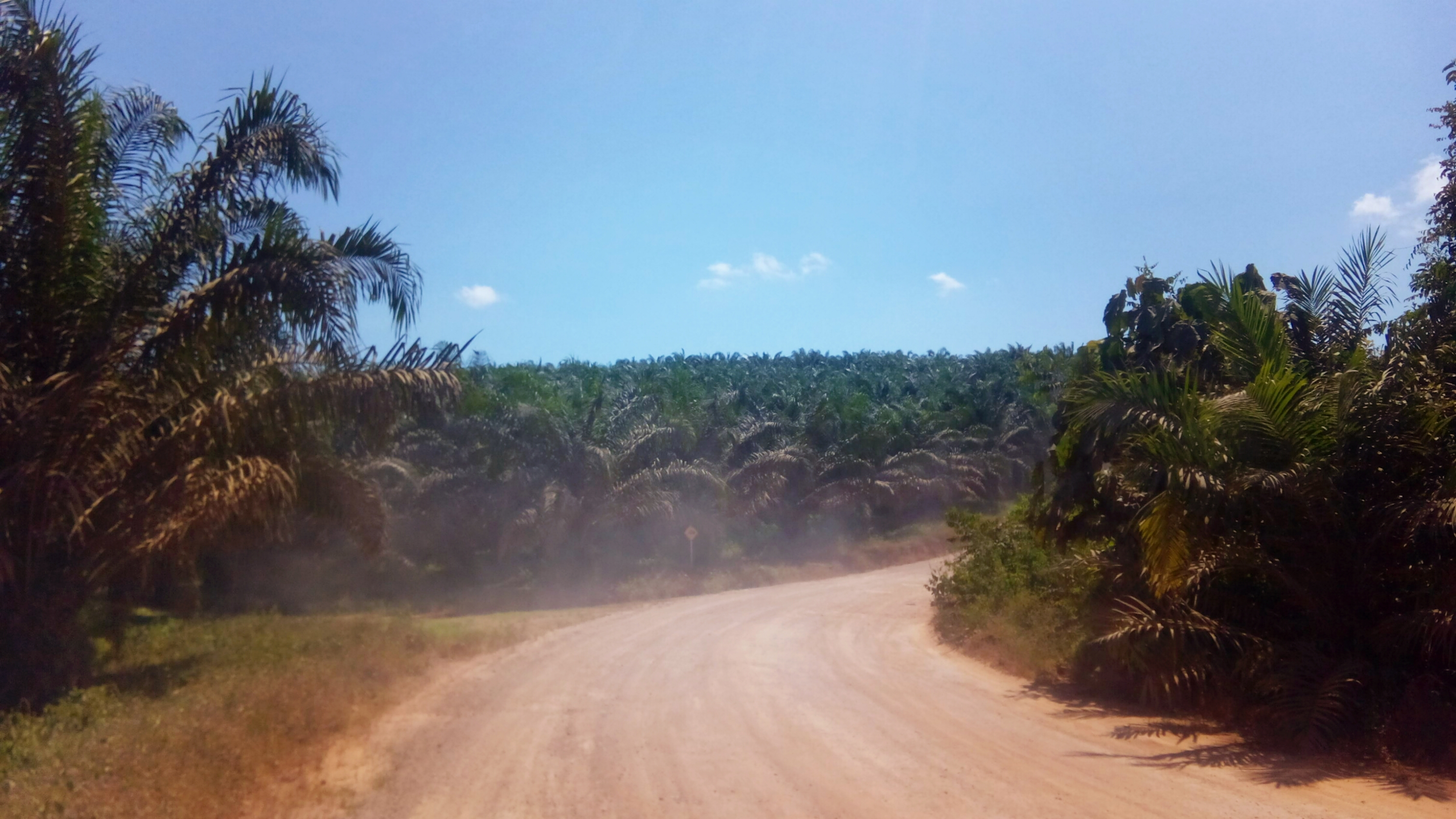
A palm oil plantation in Lamandau Regency, one of the region's primary agricultural products.

The regency is a major contributor to agriculture in Central Kalimantan province, particularly known for its production of palm oil and rubber. In 2022, the regency had a total palm oil plantation area of 24,926 hectares, yielding 110,294.78 tonnes during the same year. Meanwhile, rubber plantations covered an area of 7,098 hectares, producing 1,331.040 tonnes within the same timeframe. The agriculture sector also supports other industries in the regency, primarily the processing industry, which largely consists of palm oil refineries and processing centers. The production and economic significance of these two commodities overshadow other plantation-based products in the regency, accounting for less than 1% of its agricultural output. Another crop grown in the regency is rice, but its output has declined significantly in recent years, from 4,016 tonnes in 2021 to only 530 tonnes in 2022. The area allocated for rice farming has also decreased by 77.77% from 1,669 hectares in 2021 to just 371 hectares in 2022. Rice cultivation has become less popular among landowners in the regency, who are increasingly focusing on palm oil and rubber production. This shift has led to an increase in land conflicts between small-scale farmers and large palm oil companies, as well as significant deforestation within the regency.

The fishery industry in the regency primarily consists of inland aquaculture, given its landlocked location. In 2022, there were 549 aquaculture sites producing 689 tonnes of fish. Fish cages, where fish are raised, can be found along the Lamandau River. However, expanding the fishery sector has proven challenging due to the high cost of fish pellets and the procurement of fish seeds.

=== Trade ===
Trade accounts for 9.12% of the regency's economy as of 2022. The number of registered trading facilities, including shops and market buildings, has increased annually since 2019, reaching 2,541 facilities by 2022. Among these, 48.72% are warung, small shops typically owned by families. The highest concentration of large trade facilities is in Bulik district, with 7 marketplaces. In total, the regency has 16 registered marketplace buildings, slightly fewer than the 17 recorded in 2021. Additionally, there are 657 registered wholesale traders, 630 medium-scale traders, and 1,503 small trader businesses in the regency. Furthermore, there are 231 registered restaurant businesses.

=== Tourism ===
The number of tourists visiting the regency has experienced fluctuations since 2016, with a notable increase of over 25,000 tourists recorded in 2022. However, there was a drastic decrease in the number of visitors, by as much as 85%, between 2019 and 2020, before a rebound thereafter. This decline was attributed to the COVID-19 pandemic, which significantly impacted the tourism sector in Indonesia, including in Lamandau Regency. In 2022, the recorded number of tourists was 50,132 visitors, roughly double the figure from 2021, which saw 25,359 visitors. It is worth noting that almost all visitors are domestic, with very few international tourists. Accommodation options in the regency include 13 hotels and 8 registered homestays, along with 52 recognized tourist destinations such as waterfalls, rivers, and traditional villages.

== Demographics ==
The regency has an expansive population pyramid, with the demographic dominated by individuals aged between 30 and 34 years old in 2022. The productive age group, consisting of individuals aged between 15 and 64 years old, comprised 71.39% of the regency's population during the same year, representing a slight increase from the previous year. According to Statistics Indonesia, the total workforce population recorded in 2022 was 45,235, with around 1,541 individuals unemployed, accounting for approximately 3.41% of the workforce. Among those aged between 7 and 12 years old, the school enrollment rate was 99.44%, while for those aged between 13 and 15 years old, the rate was slightly lower at 97.41%. The expected years of schooling in the regency was reported as 12.51 years. Furthermore, the literacy rate for individuals above 15 years old in the regency as of 2022 was 99.36%.

The majority of the regency's population are Muslims, numbering 62,354 people in 2022, followed by Protestants at 24,524, Catholics at 16,917, Hindus at 3,227, Buddhists at 66, and 3 individuals practicing other religions. In 2021, the provincial government recorded 12 different ethnicities or tribes in the regency. The culture of the regency is predominantly influenced by the Dayak tribes.

== Infrastructure ==
=== Education ===
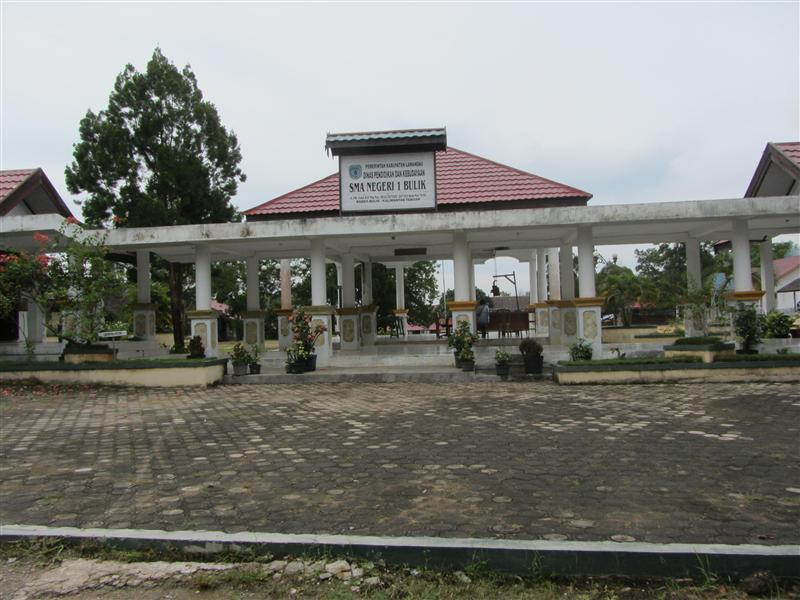
A public highschool in Nanga Bulik

The educational infrastructure in the regency is primarily concentrated in Bulik district, where the capital of the regency is located. This district boasts the highest number of schools, including 27 elementary schools, 9 junior high schools, and 3 senior high schools, as well as 2 vocational high schools. Conversely, Sematu Jaya district has the least educational infrastructure as of 2022, with only 8 elementary schools, 4 junior high schools, and 1 senior high school, along with a single vocational high school. Overall, the regency comprises a total of 82 kindergartens, 118 elementary schools, 46 junior high schools, 12 senior high schools, and 10 vocational high schools. The regency is also home to one tertiary educational institution, Lamandau Polytechnic, which is privately owned and located in the regency's capital, Nanga Bulik, within Bulik district.

=== Healthcare ===
The healthcare infrastructure in the regency comprises one hospital, 6 polyclinics, 84 puskesmas (community health centers), 5 clinics, 95 healthcare posts, 56 village clinics, and 17 registered pharmacies. The sole hospital in the regency is Lamandau Regional Hospital, a public healthcare facility managed by the regency government. It is accredited as a C-class hospital by the Ministry of Health.

=== Transportation ===
In 2022, the total road length in the regency amounted to 730.726 kilometers. Of this total, 157.13 kilometers or 21.61% are national roads managed by the central government. Provincial roads, managed solely by the provincial government, accounted for 21.4 kilometers, while the remainder consisted of regency roads managed by the local government, totaling 551.746 kilometers. Only 157.817 kilometers of these roads are paved and sealed with asphalt, representing approximately 28.60%, while the remainder are considered to be in poor condition. The road network saw a slight increase in 2022 with the construction of a new 10-kilometer road from Perigi to Beruta villages. As of now, the regency does not have an airport. However, plans are underway to construct a new airport to serve the regency, with land preparations currently taking place in Bulik district.

=== Others ===
The regency is home to a total of 217 mosques, 121 Protestant churches, 45 Catholic churches, and 14 Hindu temples.
