= Circumfix =

Type of agglutinative inflection

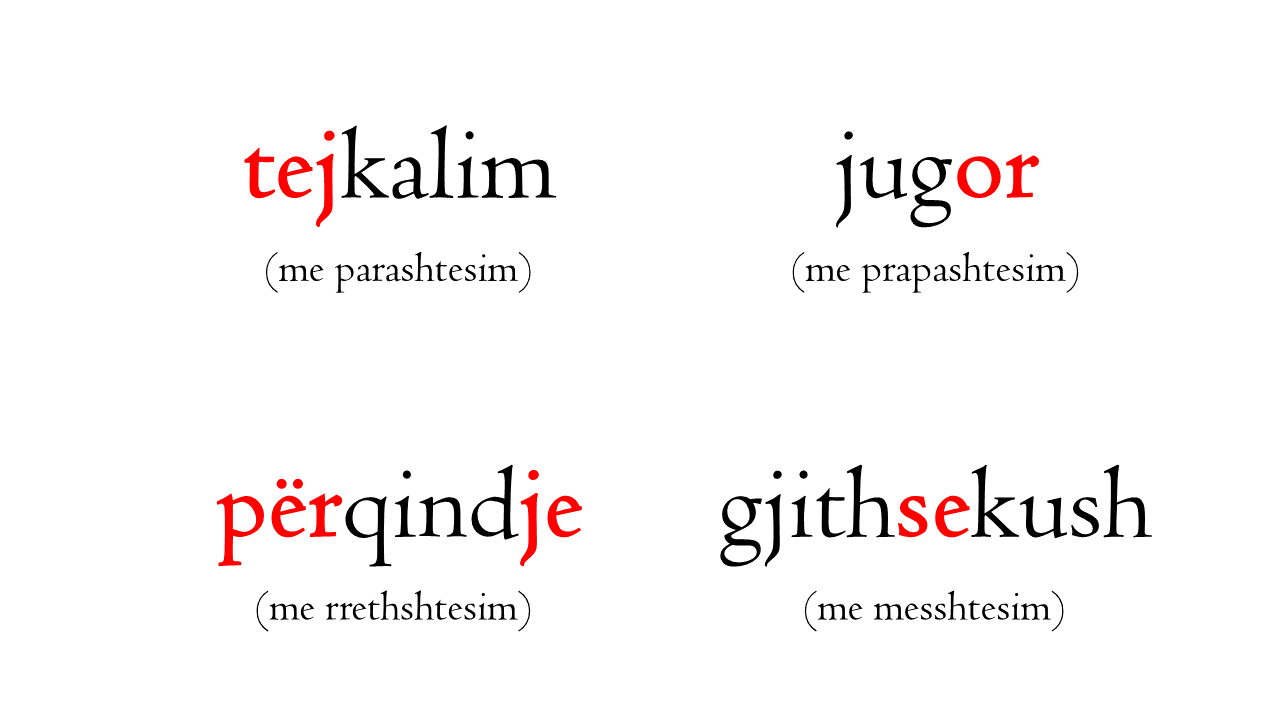
Examples of adverbial word formation in Albanian

A circumfix (abbr: circ) (also parafix, confix, or ambifix) is an affix which has two parts, one placed at the start of a word, and the other at the end. Circumfixes contrast with prefixes, attached to the beginnings of words; suffixes, attached at the end; and infixes, inserted in the middle. Circumfixes are common in Malay and Georgian.

Its related operation is called circumfixation (or parafixation, confixation, ambifixation).

== Examples ==
⟩Angle brackets⟨ are used to mark off circumfixes.

=== Germanic languages ===
The circumfix is probably most widely known from the German past participle, which is ge-⟩...⟨-t (ge- prefix + -t suffix) for regular verbs. The verb spiel-en, for example, has the participle ge-spiel-t. However, a number of so-called strong verbs display the suffix -en (ge-sung-en 'sung'), while all verbs carrying non-initial stress come without the prefix part ge-, as in telefonier-t 'telephoned'.

Dutch has a similar system (spel-en → ge-speel-d in this case). In Dutch, the circumfix ge-⟩...⟨-te (ge- prefix + -te suffix) can be used to form certain collective nouns (berg (mountain) → ge-berg-te (mountain range)).

=== East Asian languages ===
In Japanese, some linguists consider o-⟩...⟨-ni naru (o- honorific prefix + ni particle + verb naru) and o-⟩...⟨-suru (o- prefix + -suru suffix/verb suru) to be honorific circumfixes; for example yom-u (′read′) ...→ o-⟩yom-i⟨-ni naru (respectful), o-⟩yom-i⟨-suru (humble).

In addition, Old Japanese had a prohibitive construction na-⟩...⟨-so_{2}(ne) (where the bracketed ne is optional), which at least one linguist (ja) considers to be a circumfixal word form; an example using the Old Japanese verb ′write′ (kak-u) would be na-⟩kak-i_{1}⟨-so_{2}(ne). The form without the bracketed ne survived marginally into Early Middle Japanese, but has no equivalent in any modern Japanese dialect or any other Japonic language. Instead, all modern Japonic languages and dialects express the prohibitive with a suffixal particle na (which is probably related to the prefixal part of the Old Japanese construction) attached to a non-past form of the verb; e.g., Tōkyō Japanese k̅a̅ku-na, Kyōto Japanese kak̅u̅-na, Kagoshima Japanese kaʔ-n̅a̅ or kan-n̅a̅, Hachijō kaku-na, Yamatohama Amami kʰakʰu-na, Nakijin Kunigami hḁkˀu:-n̅a̅, Shuri Okinawan k̅a̅k̅u̅-n̅a̅, Irabu Miyakoan kafï-na, Hateruma Yaeyaman hḁku-na, and Yonaguni kʰagu-n-na (all ′don't write!′). In addition to the circumfixal forms, Old Japanese also had a suffixal form similar to the modern forms (e.g., kak-u-na), as well as a prefixal form na-kak-i_{1}, which is also not reflected in any modern Japonic variety.

=== Austronesian languages ===
Malay circumfixes:

per-⟩...⟨-kan
per-⟩...⟨-i
ber-⟩...⟨-an
ber-⟩...⟨-kan
me-⟩...⟨-kan
member-⟩...⟨-kan
memper-⟩...⟨-kan
menter-⟩...⟨-kan
ke-⟩...⟨-an
keber-⟩...⟨-an
keter-⟩...⟨-an
kemen-⟩...⟨-an
pen-⟩...⟨-an
pember-⟩...⟨-an
pemer-⟩...⟨-an
penter-⟩...⟨-an
per-⟩...⟨-an
se-⟩...⟨-nya
ke-⟩...⟨-i

For example, the circumfix ke-⟩...⟨-an can be added to the root adil "fair/just" to form ke-adil-an "fairness/justice".

=== Other languages ===
In most North African and some Levantine varieties of Arabic, verbs are negated by placing the circumfix ma⟩...⟨š around the verb together with all its prefixes and suffixed direct- and indirect-object pronouns. For example, Egyptian bitgibuhum-laha "you bring them to her" is negated as ma⟩bitgibuhum-lahā⟨š "you don't bring them to her".

In Berber languages the feminine is marked with the circumfix t⟩...⟨t. The word afus "hand" becomes t⟩afus⟨t. In Kabyle, θ⟩issli⟨θ "bride" derives from issli "groom". From bni, to build, with t⟩...⟨t we obtain tbnit "thou buildest".

Negation in Guaraní is also done with circumfixes, nd⟩...⟨i and nd⟩...⟨mo'ãi for future negation.

In some Slavic languages, and in Hungarian, the superlative of adjectives is formed with a circumfix. For example, in Czech, the circumfix nej⟩...⟨ší is used – mladý "young" becomes nejmladší "youngest". The corresponding circumfix in Hungarian is leg⟩...⟨bb, as in legnagyobb "biggest", from nagy "big". (In both cases, the comparative form is produced using the suffix without the prefix: mladší "younger"; nagyobb "bigger".)

In Gurmanchema and Wolof, noun classes are indicated by circumfix.

== See also ==
- Circumposition
- Silent (or magic) e, a discontiguous digraph in English
- Epenthesis
