= Pontianak Kota =

District of Pontianak

Coordinates: 0.0328°S 109.3226°E

Pontianak Kota (Pontianak town in English) is a district (Indonesian:kecamatan) of the city of Pontianak. It lies on the south bank of the Kapuas Besar River and covers an area of 15.98 km^{2}. It had a population of 110,111 at the 2010 census; the latest official estimate of population (as at mid 2019) is 1227,700. This is the location of Pontianak's main civic administrative offices.

List of famous places in Pontianak Kota:

1. Dwikora Harbour, main harbour of Pontianak
2. Pontianak Major Office
3. Inter-district ferry dock (connects North Pontianak and Pontianak Kota)
4. Matahari Shopping Mall
5. Kebon Sajoek Stadium, home of the city football club Persipon Pontianak

== History ==
Pontianak Kota was established in 2003 from the eastern part of West Pontianak district.
