= West Kalimantan Christian Church =

Christian church organization in Indonesia

West Kalimantan Christian Church Gereja Kristen Kalimantan Barat (GKKB) 西加基督教會
- Classification: Protestant, evangelical
- Region: West Kalimantan, Indonesia
- Origin: 1906 (Singkawang congregation); 1966 (formation of synod); West Kalimantan
- Congregations: 45 (including 24 evangelism posts)
- Official website: http://www.gkkb.or.id/

West Kalimantan Christian Church (Chinese: 西加基督教會, Indonesian: Gereja Kristen Kalimantan Barat) or GKKB is an evangelical Christian church organization in West Kalimantan, Indonesia.

== History ==
The church history began from three separately independent churches in Singkawang, Pontianak, and Pemangkat. All of them are in West Borneo, at that time part of Dutch East Indies.

The Singkawang Congregation was founded in the early 20th century, in the year 1906, by American evangelical missionary Charles M. Worthington. Then in 1928 the church got assistance from Basel Mission.

The Pontianak Congregation, started on 6 June 1935 by some Christians who came from China. This church then get assistance from Chinese missionaries. During the Japanese occupation, the Chinese people in West Borneo, especially the Christians faced persecution. During this time multiple churches were forced to be closed and a reverend was killed. After the end of World War II in 1950 the church received assistance from missionaries of China Inland Mission (now OMF International).

The Pemangkat Congregation was founded by some Christians who moved to Pemangkat. In the beginning they just conducted worship at a house. Finally with the help from missionaries who came to Pemangkat in the 1950s, the Pemangkat Church building was officially built in 1963.

These three churches then extend their evangelical mission to the surrounding areas, and built new churches in many towns and villages of West Borneo.

In 1966 the three main churches, along with other churches affiliated with them, agreed to merge and found a church organization which was named Chinese Christian Church (Hanzi: 中華基督教會, Teochew dialect: Tiong Hua Kie Tok Kauw Hwee), with the Pontianak Congregation as the center of synod.

Facing the political and social turbulence in Indonesia (Indonesian killings of 1965–66 while in the Transition to the New Order), then at the great plenary session in 1967, the synod decided to change the church name to West Kalimantan Christian Church (Chinese: 西加基督教會, Indonesian: Gereja Kristen Kalimantan Barat), abbreviated as GKKB.

On 2 July 1988, the GKKB synod became a member of Council of Churches in Indonesia (CCI).

== Congregations and Evangelism Posts ==
This is a list of the West Kalimantan Christian Church congregations and evangelism posts (EP), grouped by cities and regencies:

=== Pontianak City ===
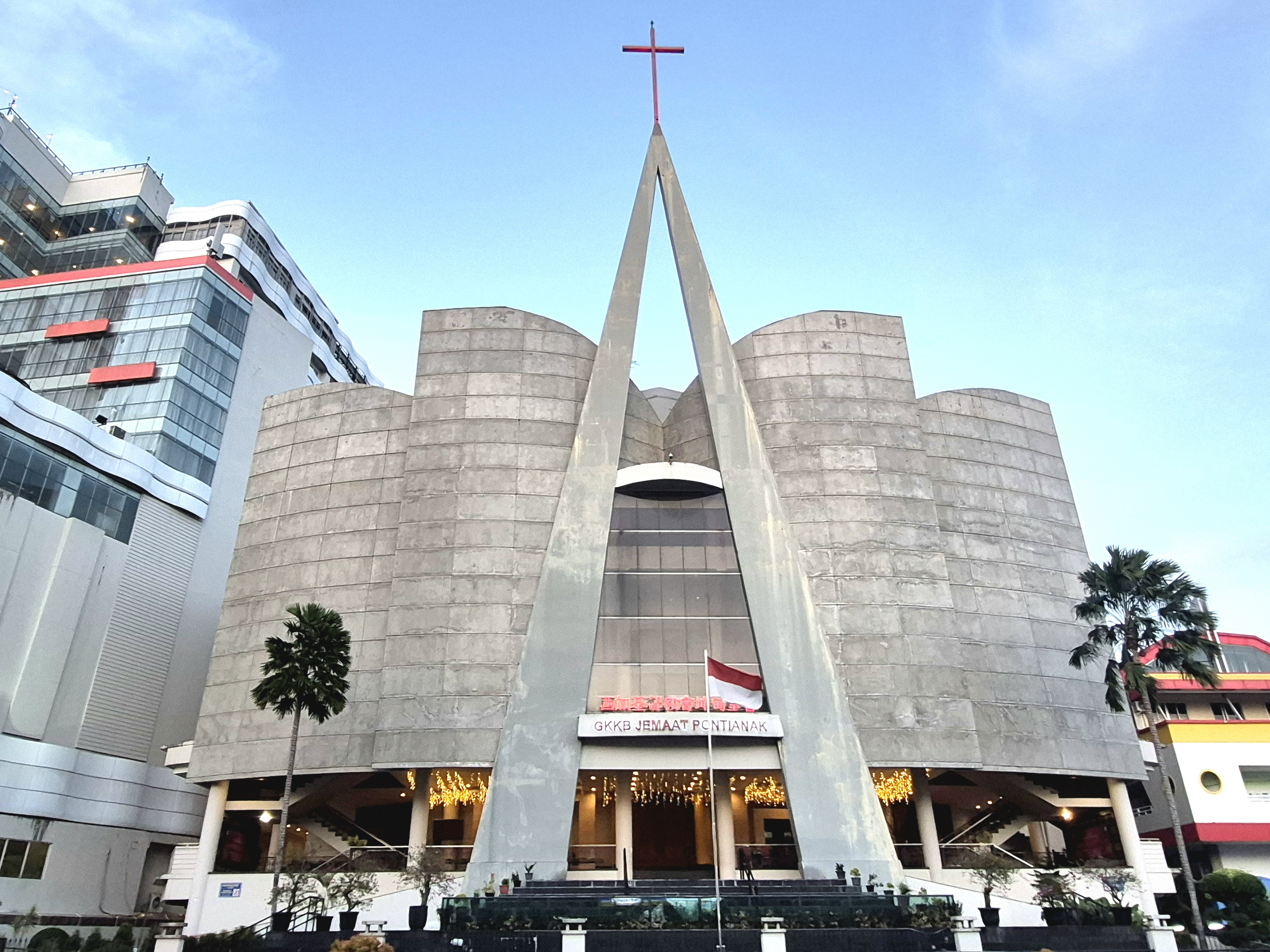
West Kalimantan Christian Church of Pontianak Congregation.

1. Pontianak Congregation (location: South Pontianak District)
2. Jeruju Congregation (location: West Pontianak District)
3. Purnama Congregation (location: South Pontianak District)
4. Siantan Congregation (location: North Pontianak District)
5. Sungai Selamat EP (location: North Pontianak District)
6. Parit Pangeran EP (location: North Pontianak District)
7. Purnama Hijau EP (location: South Pontianak District)

=== Great Kubu (Kubu Raya) Regency ===
1. Parit Baru Congregation (location: Parit Baru Village, Sungai Raya District)
2. Sungai Raya Dalam EP (location: Sungai Raya Dalam Village, Sungai Raya District)
3. Kakap EP (location: Sungai Kakap Village, Sungai Kakap District)
4. Kumpai Kecil EP (location: Kuala Dua Village, Sungai Raya District)
5. Kumpai Besar EP (location: Sungai Ambangah Village, Sungai Raya District)
6. Punggur EP (location: Punggur Kecil Village, Sungai Kakap District)
7. Kalimas EP (location: Kalimas Village, Sungai Kakap District)
8. Ambawang EP (location: Sungai Ambawang Village, Sungai Ambawang District)

=== Mempawah Regency ===
1. Mempawah Congregation (location: Mempawah Hilir District)
2. Segedong Congregation (location: Segedong District)
3. Sungai Pinyuh Congregation (location: Sungai Pinyuh District)
4. Semudun Congregation (location: Sungai Kunyit District)
5. Jungkat EP (location: Jungkat Village, Siantan District)
6. Sungai Purun EP (location: Sungai Purun Kecil Village, Sungai Pinyuh District)
7. Peniraman EP (location: Peniraman Village, Sungai Pinyuh District)
8. Kampung Suap (Suap Village) EP (location: Suap Orchard, Pasir Village, Mempawah Hilir District)

=== Singkawang City ===
1. Singkawang Congregation (location: West Singkawang District)
2. Lirang EP (location: South Singkawang District)
3. Roban EP (location: Central Singkawang District)
4. Kopisan EP (location: South Singkawang District)
5. Sijangkung EP (location: South Singkawang District)
6. Sakkok EP (location: South Singkawang District)

=== Bengkayang Regency ===
1. Sungai Duri Congregation (location: Sungai Duri Village, Sungai Raya District)
2. Sungai Pangkalan Congregation (location: Sungai Pangkalan 2 Village, Sungai Raya District)
3. Pasar Gunung Congregation (location: Sungai Pangkalan 2 Village, Sungai Raya District)
4. Teluk Suak (Suak Bay) Congregation (location: Karimunting Village, Sungai Raya Islands District)
5. Sungai Raya Kepulauan (Great River Islands) EP (location: Sungai Raya Village, Sungai Raya Islands District)

=== Sambas Regency ===
1. Pemangkat Congregation (location: Pemangkat District)
2. Tebas Congregation (location: Tebas District)
3. Selakau Congregation (location: Selakau District)
4. Matang Suri Congregation (location: South Jawai District)
5. Sentebang Congregation (location: Jawai District)
6. Sambas Congregation (location: Sambas District)
7. Kartiasa EP (location: Kartiasa Village, Sambas District)

=== Sekadau Regency ===
1. Sekadau EP (location: Sekadau District)

=== Sintang Regency ===
1. Sintang EP (location: Sintang District)

=== Melawi Regency ===
1. Nanga Pinoh Congregation (location: Nanga Pinoh District)

=== Ketapang Regency ===
1. Ketapang EP (location: Delta Pawan District)

== Affiliated Schools ==
1. Immanuel Christian School (Pontianak)
2. Maranatha Christian School (Siantan, North Pontianak)
3. Torsina Christian School (Singkawang)
4. Eben Haezer Christian School (Pemangkat)
5. Immanuel Christian School (Segedong, Mempawah Regency)
6. GKKB Christian School (Sungai Pinyuh, Mempawah Regency)
7. Immanuel Christian School (Nanga Pinoh, Melawi Regency)
8. Immanuel Christian Kindergarten (Sentebang, Sambas Regency)
9. Christian Educational Foundation School (Pontianak)
