= Silaban =

Batak surname originating in Indonesia

Silaban is one of Toba Batak clans originating in North Sumatra, Indonesia. People of this clan bear the clan's name as their surname. Notable people of this clan include:

- Friedrich Silaban (1912-1984), Indonesian architect
- Pantur Silaban (1937-2022), Indonesian physicist
- Tigor Silaban (1953-2021), Indonesian doctor
