= South East Pontianak =

South East Pontianak (Pontianak Tenggara in Indonesian) is a district (Indonesian:kecamatan) of the city of Pontianak. It lies on the south bank of the Kapuas Kecil River (prior to its amalgamation with the Landak River to form the Kapuas Besar River) and covers an area of 14.83 km^{2}. It had a population of 44,856 at the 2010 census; the latest official estimate of population (as at mid 2019) is 52,326.

== History ==
South East Pontianak was established in 2008 from the eastern part of South Pontianak district.
