= Dwikora Harbour =

Harbour in West Kalimantan, Indonesia

- Native name: Pelabuhan Dwikora

Location
- Country: Indonesia
- Location: Pontianak, West Kalimantan

Details
- Type of harbour: River port

Dwikora Harbour (Indonesian: Pelabuhan Dwikora), also known as Pontianak Port, is the main harbour of Pontianak, West Kalimantan, Indonesia. It is located on the banks of the Kapuas River in the central area of Pontianak, near the Pontianak mayor's office.

For several years it functioned as the largest port in West Kalimantan before its position was replaced by Kijing Terminal in Mempawah Regency. Container ship traffic has gradually been relocated to Kijing due to capacity limitations and its location within the urban area of Pontianak.

== History ==
The existence of the port is linked to the establishment of the Pontianak Sultanate. Pontianak was founded on 23 October 1771 by Syarif Abdurrahman Alkadrie at the confluence of the Kapuas Kecil and Landak rivers, an area that later developed into a center of trade and river transport.

In 1939 a wooden jetty measuring 298 meters in length was constructed, along with a warehouse of approximately 230 square meters. This early infrastructure became the foundation of the present harbour. On 16 June 1940, Pontianak Port was designated as a managed port by the colonial administration.

During the colonial period, its position on the Kapuas River connected inland areas of West Kalimantan with coastal and international trade routes.

== Facilities ==
The port is equipped with container handling facilities and supports general cargo operations. Its passenger terminal serves as the only public sea transport passenger terminal in West Kalimantan.

== Operations ==
Dwikora Harbour has handled container cargo, as well as general cargo. Limited yard capacity and river sedimentation have affected operational efficiency and required periodic dredging of the navigation channel, which extends approximately 90 kilometers from the river mouth toward the port area.

Container operations have progressively shifted to Kijing Terminal, which was developed to accommodate larger vessels and higher cargo volumes. Plans indicate that Dwikora Harbour will continue operating, though its role is expected to focus more on smaller vessels and passenger services as cargo activities are relocated.
