= East Pontianak =

Coordinates: 0°1′53.4″S 109°21′36.3″E

East Pontianak (Pontianak Timur in Indonesian) is a district (Indonesian:kecamatan) of the city of Pontianak. It lies on the north bank of the Kapuas Kecil River (before its confluence with the Landak River, which tributary forms the western boundary of the district, to form the Kapuas Besar River) and covers an area of 8.78 km^{2}. It had a population of 82,370 at the 2010 census; the latest official estimate of population (as of mid-2019) is 96,029.
