= Equator Monument =

Equator marker in Pontianak, Indonesia

Coordinates: 0°00′03.8″N 109°19′20.0″E

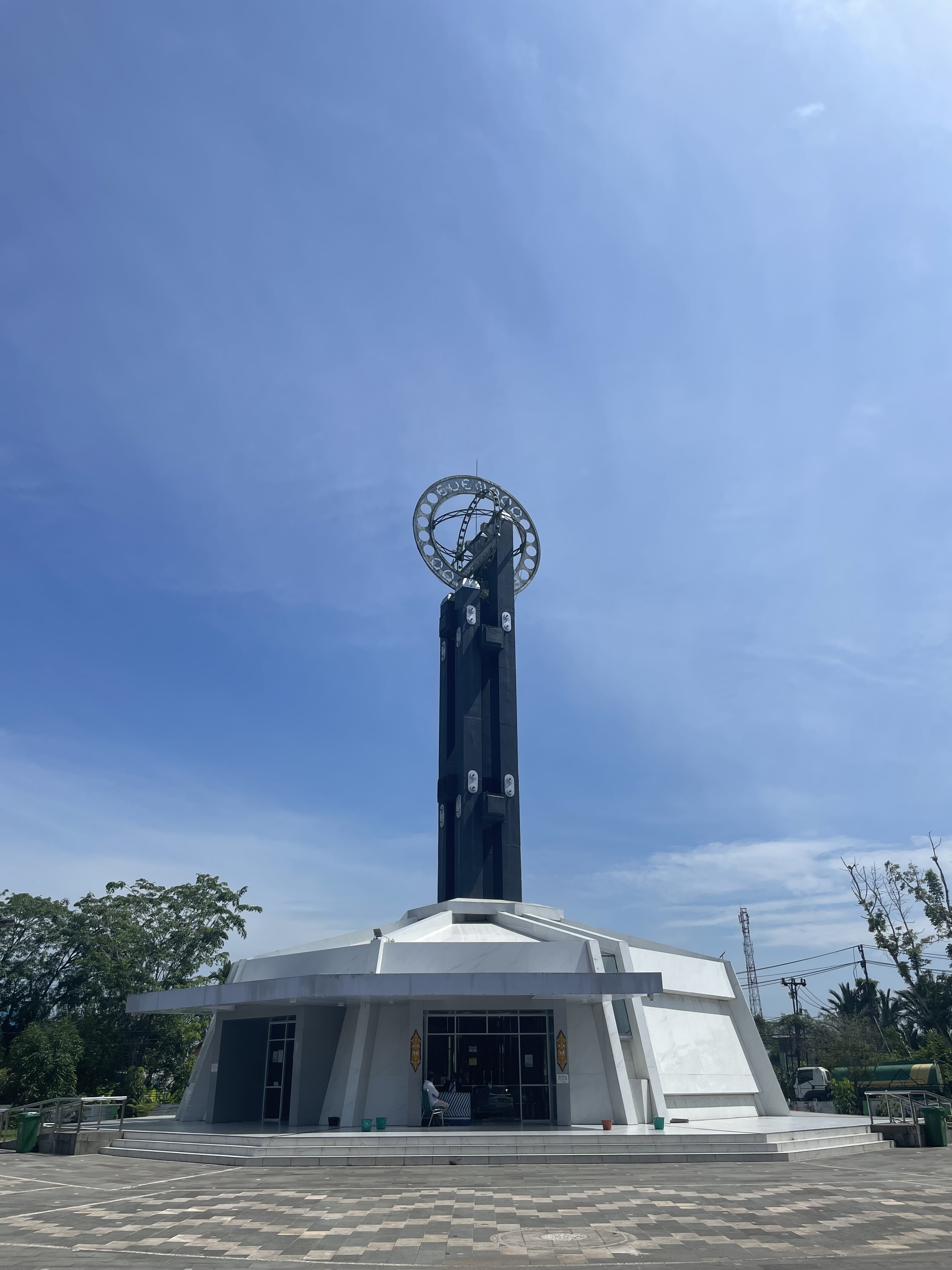
The equatorial monument in Pontianak, West Kalimantan, Indonesia

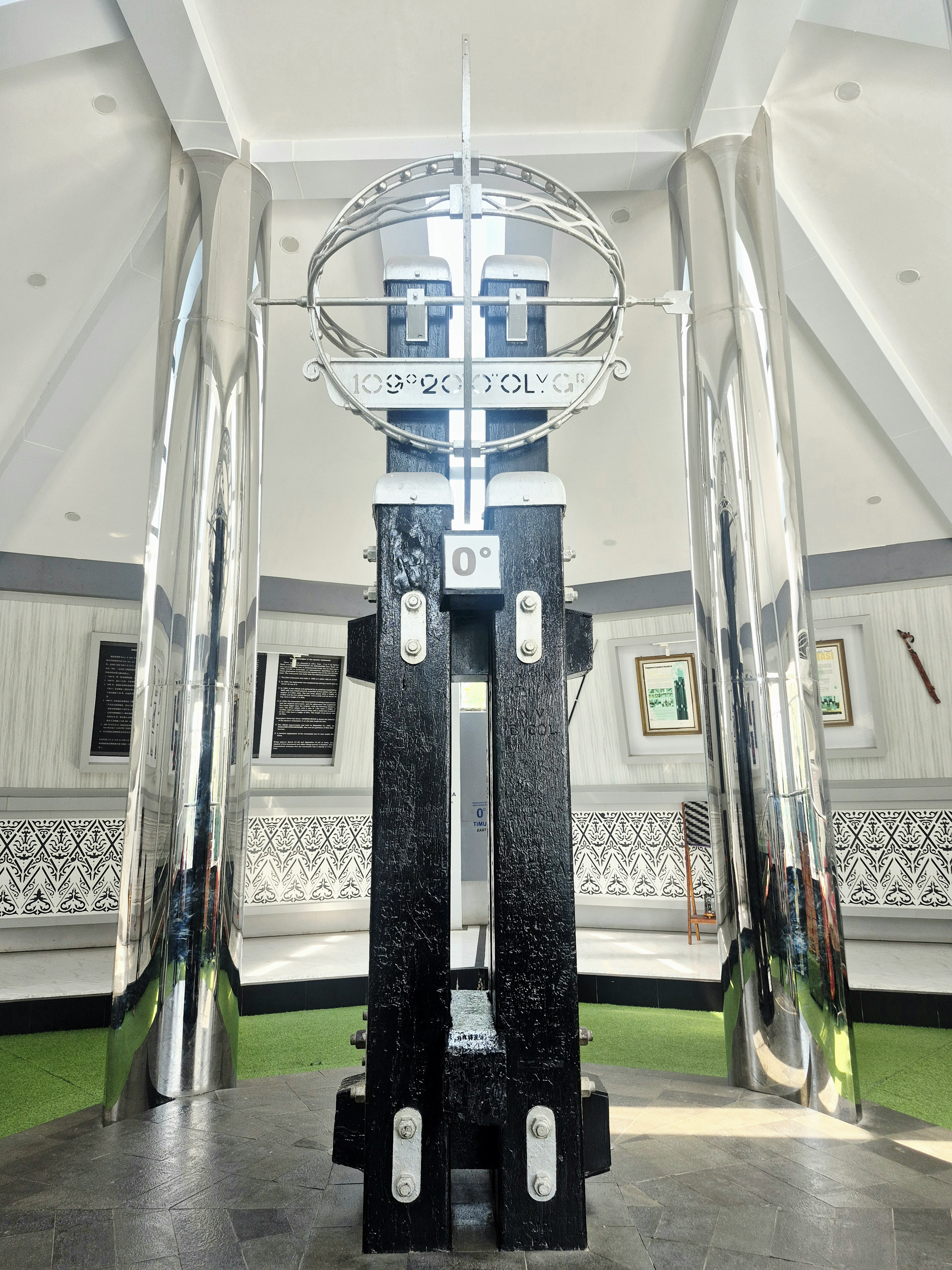
The original equator monument contained in building

The Equator Monument (Indonesian: Tugu Khatulistiwa) is located on the equator in Pontianak, Indonesia. It marks the division between the Northern Hemisphere and Southern Hemisphere. The monument was built along the Kapuas River.

== History ==
- First monument built in 1928 by a Dutch geographer.
- 1930 completed, in form of bollard radially and dart.
- 1938 rebuilt with completion by architect Friedrich Silaban. The original monument is still visible in the interior.
- 1990 renovated with the addition of a dome to protect the original monument and also making of duplicate of monument of the size five times bigger than its original size.
- Its grand opening on September 21, 1991.

== Construction ==
The monument consists of four ironwood poles, each with a diameter of about 0,30 metres, with frontage bollard height is two pieces as high as 3,05 radian place backside bollard and the signpost dart as high as 4,40 metres.

== Location ==
Its location is at Jalan Khatulistiwa, literally translated into Equator Road, North Pontianak, about 3 kilometres from the city centre of Pontianak.

The exact location of the equator monument is not on the equator due to early measurement errors and continuing plate tectonics. The equator has moved slightly southwards and there is another line outside the monument, that shows the recorded position in 2005. The position of the equator in 2010 is even further south and now is in a river, as a GPS device can confirm.
