= Tigor Silaban =

Indonesian doctor (1953–2021)

- Silaban, c. 2018
- Born: 1 April 1953; Bogor, West Java, Indonesia
- Died: 6 August 2021 (aged 68); Jayapura, Papua, Indonesia
- Occupation: Doctor

Tigor Silaban (1 April 1953 – 6 August 2021) was an Indonesian doctor.

He worked in remote parts of Papua for government clinics since his graduation from the University of Indonesia, and continued to work there for nearly forty years until his retirement in 2017.

== Early life and education ==
Silaban was born in Bogor on 1 April 1953. His father, Friedrich Silaban, was a renowned architect. He graduated from Canisius College, Jakarta, and resumed his education at the University of Indonesia (UI)'s faculty of medicine. Silaban claimed that he applied at the Faculty of Medicine only at his father’s request, even though he had intended to study engineering—but he was accepted instead. Despite his reluctance, he managed to graduate. As a result, he made a written vow to work in Indonesia’s interior, far from Jakarta, and not to work as a private doctor.

== Career ==
He began working in Papua in 1979, when after graduating he was assigned to the puskesmas (government clinic) in Oksibil in what was then Jayawijaya Regency. He was the only doctor there, and in an interview he remarked how a rumor of his murder nearly triggered a tribal war.

Due to the remoteness of his working locations, the clinic buildings were often simple wooden structures without any flooring. Silaban organized a radio network to allow the scattered clinics to communicate with one another. Although he was a general practitioner, the severe shortage of doctors in Papua meant that he often had to perform specialist surgeries when transporting patients to the provincial capital at Jayapura was not an option. He was then given the status of a formal civil servant and relocated to Wamena, and served as chief of the regency's health service until 1993. At some point, he returned to UI to study for a master's degree in public health.

Silaban was later promoted to become chief of the provincial health service, a position he would hold until his retirement in 2017. He also established a "parallel" health service which involved the training of non-medical staff in preventive care. He also mentored younger doctors working in Papua. After his retirement, he continued to work as a public health consultant, focusing on healthcare information systems and childhood nutrition. He died at a hospital in Jayapura on 6 August 2021 due to COVID-19. At the time of his death, he had four children.
