= Port of Tanjungpura =

Port in Kalimantan, Indonesia

Coordinates: 0.497364°N 108.905890°E

Kijing International Port, is an under-construction seaport located in Mempawah Regency, West Kalimantan, Indonesia. It is developed by PT Pelabuhan Indonesia II as an international seaport to support the economic development in western Kalimantan. Originally named as Kijing Terminal, the port will be renamed as Port of Tanjungpura, by the suggestion of Governor Sutarmidji, after the historical Tanjungpura Kingdom.
