= Friedrich Silaban =

Indonesian architect

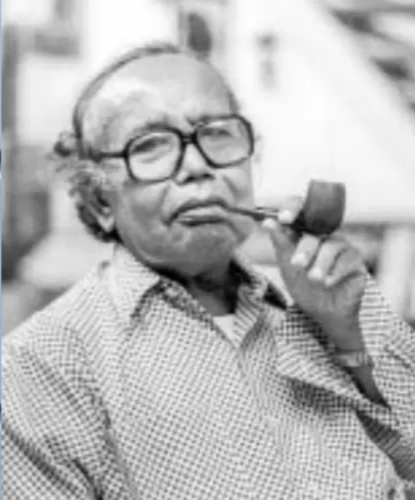
- Silaban, c. 1955
- Born: 16 December 1912; Bonan Dolok, Samosir, Dutch East Indies
- Died: 14 May 1984 (aged 71); Central Jakarta, Indonesia
- Burial place: Cipaku Cemetery, Bogor
- Education: Academy of Architecture
- Occupation: Architect
- Buildings: List: Istiqlal Mosque, Jakarta; Gelora Bung Karno Sports Complex (Main Stadium, Istora & Madya Stadium); The Equator monument; West Irian Liberation Monument; Al-Azhar Great Mosque; Indonesian Air Force headquarters; Bank Indonesia headquarters

Friedrich Silaban (16 December 1912 – 14 May 1984) was an Indonesian architect. His most well-known designs, such as the Istiqlal Mosque and the Gelora Bung Karno Sports Complex, in particular the Main Stadium in Jakarta, were commissioned during the presidency of Sukarno. Silaban preferred architectural modernism over traditional Indonesian styles.

== Early life and education ==
Silaban was born on 16 December 1912 in the village of Bonan Dolok, today in Samosir Regency, as the fifth child of a Batak Protestant Christian Church pastor, Rev. Jonas Silaban. He completed his basic education in Tapanuli, graduating in 1927 before moving to Batavia to attend the Koningin Wilhelmina School, where he studied building design and construction. He graduated from there in 1931.

== Career ==
After graduating, Silaban began working under Dutch architect J.H. Antonisse who had moved to Batavia in 1914, and between 1931 and 1937 Silaban worked on drawings for public works projects in Batavia. He was then reassigned to Pontianak, where in 1938 he designed the Equator Monument. He was interned for several months following the Japanese invasion in 1942, and during this period he met Sukarno, and the two had discussions on architecture and the arts. During the Indonesian National Revolution, Silaban remained a public works official based in Bogor, before attending the Academy of Architecture in Amsterdam between 1949 and 1950. During his stint overseas, Silaban toured modern architecture including the Eiffel Tower, the buildings of Brasília, and the Empire State Building.

=== 1950s–1966: Public works, Istiqlal Mosque and Gelora Bung Karno ===
Aside from his public works projects in Bogor, Silaban began working on national projects in the 1950s. He designed the gateway to the Kalibata Heroes' Cemetery in 1953, and his designs for the headquarters of Bank Indonesia and the Istiqlal Mosque were accepted around 1955. According to Silaban's son, he participated in the Istiqlal Mosque design competition even though he is a Protestant man, Silaban had to use a pseudonym in order for his submission to be acceptable. Other mosques designed by Silaban includes the Al-Azhar Great Mosque (the country's largest prior to Istiqlal) and another mosque in Biak which was constructed following the Indonesian takeover of Western New Guinea.

Silaban also took part in the National Monument design competition. While his first submission in 1955 was the highest ranked by the jury, it was not accepted and won second place while the first place went vacant. After a second attempt failed, Sukarno offered Silaban and another architect, Soedarsono, the opportunity to lead the project in 1961, but Silaban refused, preferring to work on the project alone. Soedarsono was eventually commissioned to design the monument. In 1959, Silaban co-founded the Indonesian Institute of Architects in 1959 along with Mohammad Susilo and Liem Bwan Tjie. When Sukarno begun the project for a sports complex in Jakarta, he initially wanted the complex to be in Dukuh Atas, then close to Jakarta's city center. Silaban, who joined the project in the middle of the planning stages, disagreed with Sukarno and instead recommended the Senayan area – citing future ease of access and traffic congestion in Dukuh Atas. Silaban's recommendation was selected, and the sports complex was constructed in Senayan.

=== 1967–1984: Career decline ===
After the fall of Sukarno, Silaban had less success as an architect, since he was strongly associated with the former president. His career situation was worsened by the poor economic conditions, forcing him to rely on his pension to support his ten children. He did receive some work in the late 1970s and early 1980s, designing a number of private residences and a university building in Medan. Silaban's health worsened in 1983, and he died at the Gatot Soebroto Army Hospital in Jakarta on 14 May 1984. He was buried at the Cipaku cemetery in Bogor, West Java.

== Style ==
In his high-profile projects, Silaban preferred clean designs which lacked the ornamentation traditionally found in Indonesian architecture. He wanted to avoid elements which correspond to a specific culture in Indonesia, arguing that an authentically-Indonesian architectural style did not need to imitate traditional forms.

== List of works ==
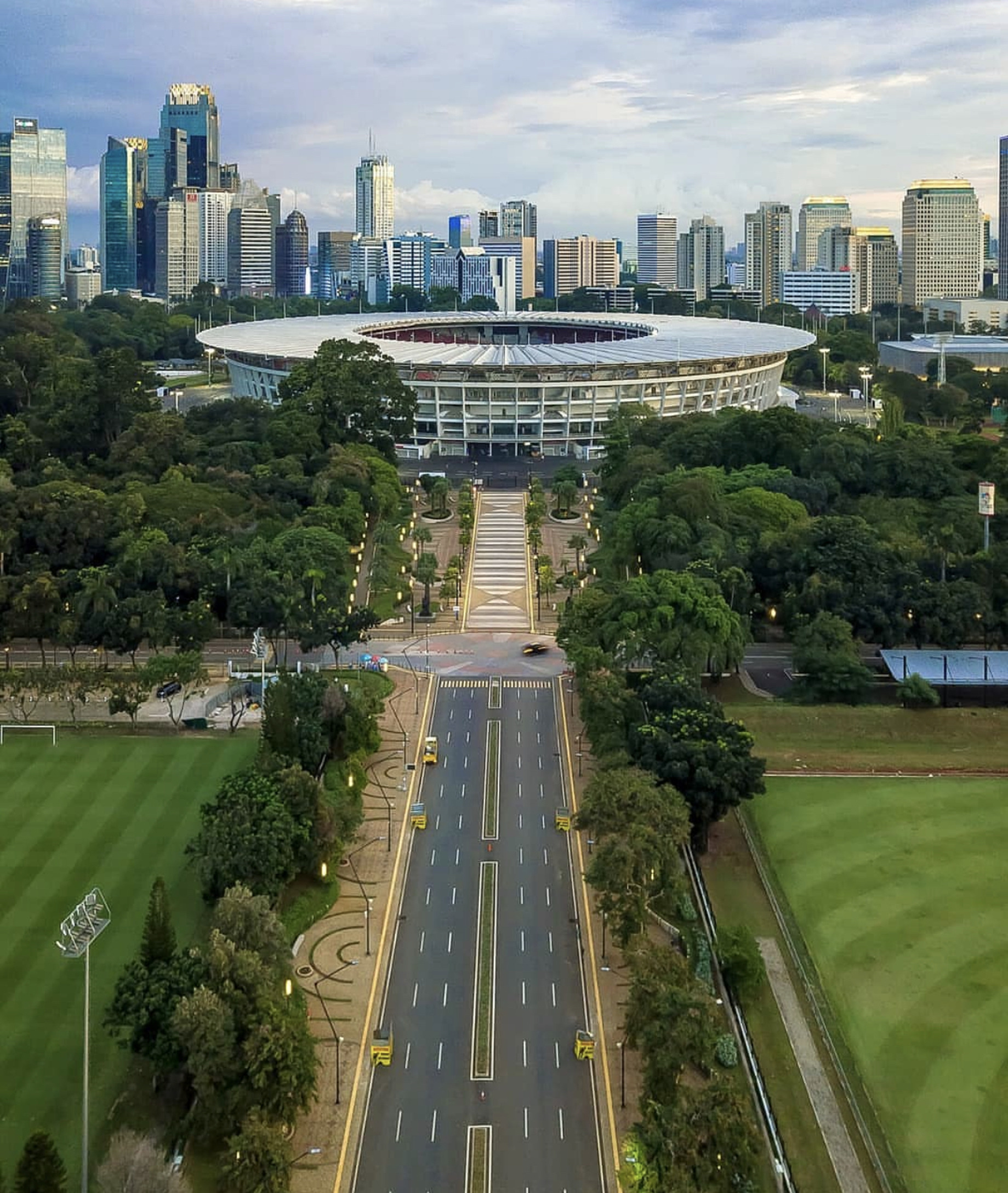
Gelora Bung Karno Main Stadium

Istiqlal Mosque

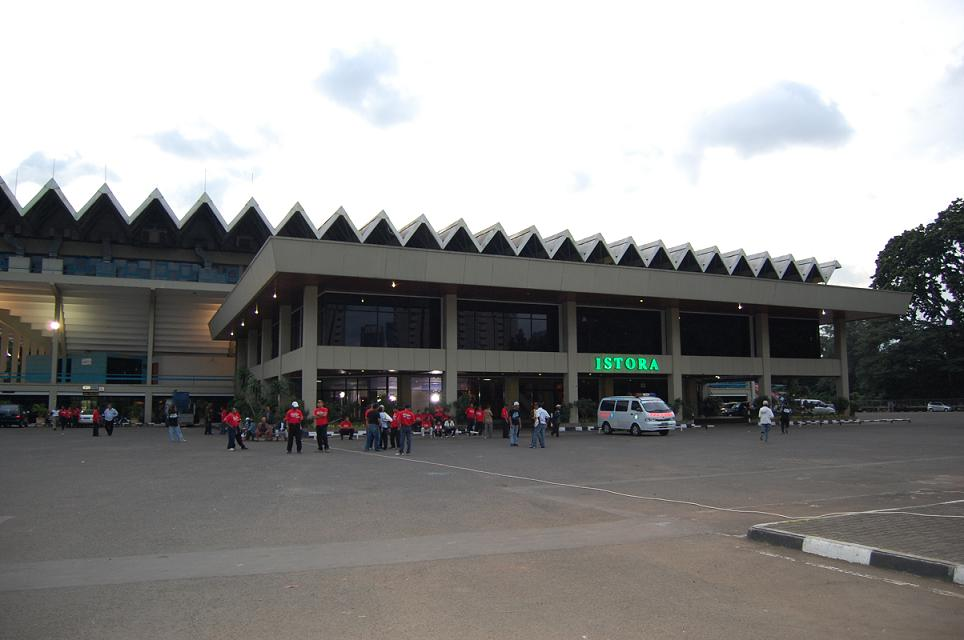
Istora Gelora Bung Karno

West Irian Liberation Monument

== Bibliography ==
- de Vletter, Martien (2009). Masa lalu dalam masa kini: arsitektur di Indonesia (in Indonesian). Gramedia Pustaka Utama. ISBN 978-979-22-4382-6.
- Nas, Peter J. M. (1993). Urban Symbolism. BRILL. ISBN 978-90-04-09855-8.
- Sopandi, Setiadi (2009). "Indonesian Architectural Culture during Guided Democracy (1959–1965): Sukarno and the Works of Friedrich Silaban". Dynamics of the Cold War in Asia. Palgrave Macmillan. pp. 53–72. doi:10.1057/9780230101999_4. ISBN 9780230101999.
- Wiryomartono, Bagoes (4 March 2020). Traditions and Transformations of Habitation in Indonesia: Power, Architecture, and Urbanism. Springer Nature. ISBN 9789811534058.
