= West Pontianak =

Coordinates: 0°0′28.7″S 109°17′48.8″E

West Pontianak (Pontianak Barat in Indonesian) is a district (Indonesian:kecamatan) in Pontianak in Kalimantan, the Indonesian part of the island of Borneo. Covering an area of 16.23 km^{2} (6.27 sq mi) across four kelurahan (sub-districts)–Pal Lima, Sungai Jawi Dalam, Sungai Jawi Luar, and Sungai Beliung, it had a population of 151,553 residents in 2024.

== Geography ==
West Pontianak district is located in Kalimantan, the Indonesian part of the island of Borneo. Covering an area of 16.23 km^{2} (6.27 sq mi), it is sub-divided into four kelurahan (urban villages)–Pal Lima, Sungai Jawi Dalam, Sungai Jawi Luar, and Sungai Beliung. Sungai Beliung, covering 5.67 km^{2} (2.19 sq mi), is the largest by area, and Sungai Jawi Dalam, covering 2.43 km^{2} (0.94 sq mi), smallest by area. It forms part of Pontianak, the seat and largest city of Kalimantan, which lies on the south bank of the Kapuas River, the longest river in Indonesia. The territory consists of low-lying urban terrain, which is prone to flooding during heavy rains.

== Demographics ==
The district had a population of 151,553 in 2024. The population consisted of 75,795 males and 75,758 females. The largest kelurahan by population is Sungai Beliung with a population of 58,865 people, while the smallest is Pal Lima with 20,141 people. The Pontianak Malay people are predominantly engaged in agriculture, and adhre to Islam. Major crops grown include banana, guava, and chilli pepper. There are 25 primary schools, 12 junior schools, and seven high schools in the sub district. There is one major public hospital and three public health centers.
