= North Pontianak =

Coordinates: 0°0′47.2″N 109°18′46.5″E

North Pontianak (Indonesian: Pontianak Utara) is a district (Indonesian:kecamatan) of the city of Pontianak. It lies on the north bank of the Kapuas Besar River (west of the confluence between the Kapuas Kecil River and the Landak River, which join to form the Kapuas Besar River) and covers an area of 37.22 km^{2}. It had a population of 112,577 at the 2010 census; the latest official estimate of population (as of mid-2019) is 130,344. This is the largest district by area and also the district with lowest population density in Pontianak.

List of famous places in North Pontianak:

1. The Equator monument
2. Khatulistiwa golf course
3. Pontianak Aloe Vera Center
4. Pontianak Sultanate cemetery
5. Batu Layang bus terminal
6. Puring traditional market
7. Institute Dayakologi
8. Poltekes Pontianak
