= South Pontianak =

South Pontianak (Pontianak Selantan in Indonesian) is a district (Indonesian:kecamatan) of the city of Pontianak. It lies on the south bank of the Kapuas Kecil River (before its amalgamation with the Landak River to form the Kapuas Besar River) and covers an area of 14.54 km^{2}. It had a population of 81,821 at the 2010 census; the latest official estimate of population (as of mid-2019) is 97,202.
