= Pontianak =

Capital and largest city of West Kalimantan, Indonesia

Pontianak Khuntien
- City
- City of Pontianak; Kota Pontianak

Regional transcription(s)
  - Jawi: ڤونتيانق
  - Chinese: 坤甸 (Hanzi); Kūn diān (Pinyin); Kung¹ diêng⁶ (Peng'im); Khun-tîen (Pha̍k-fa-sṳ)
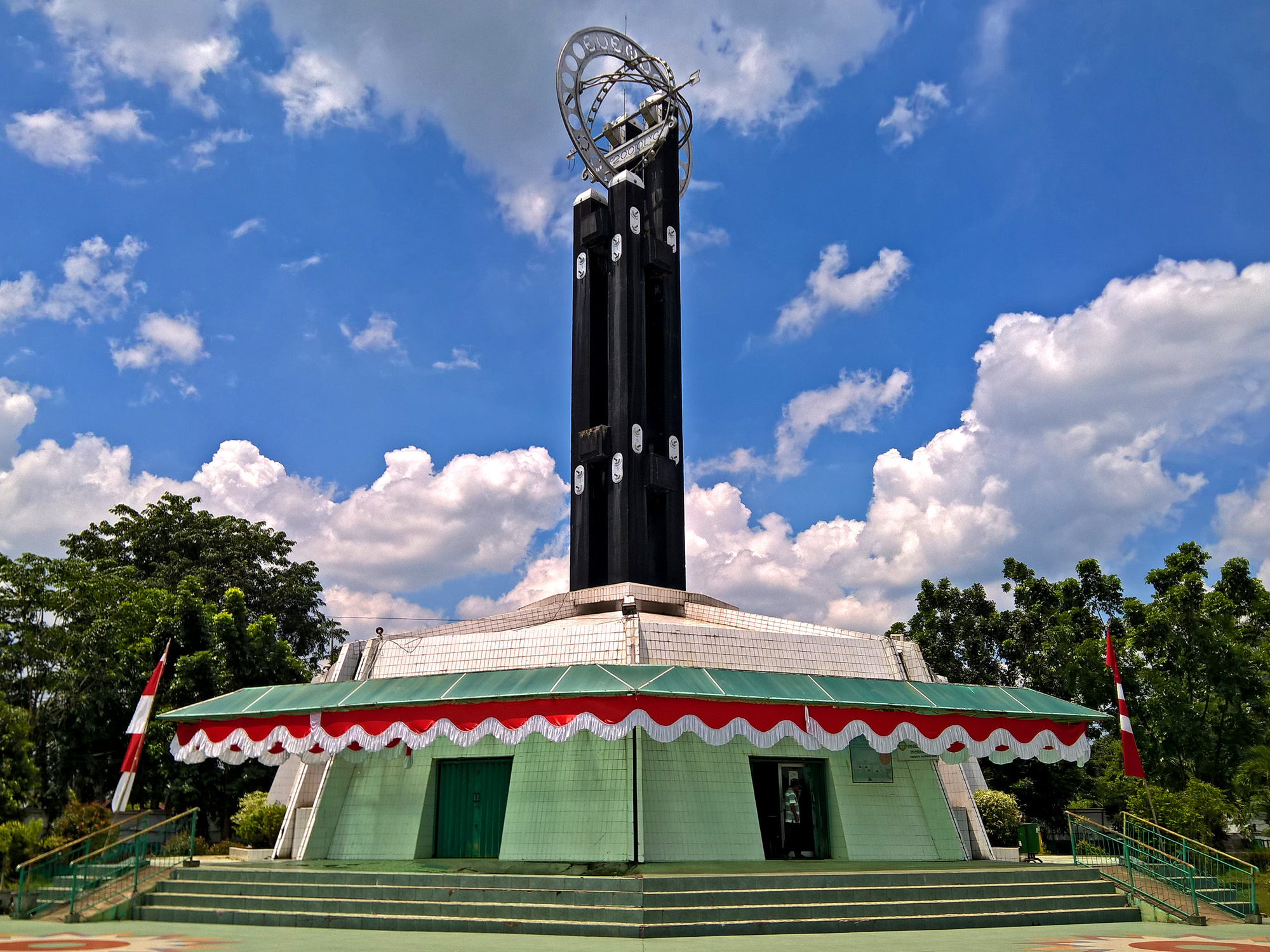
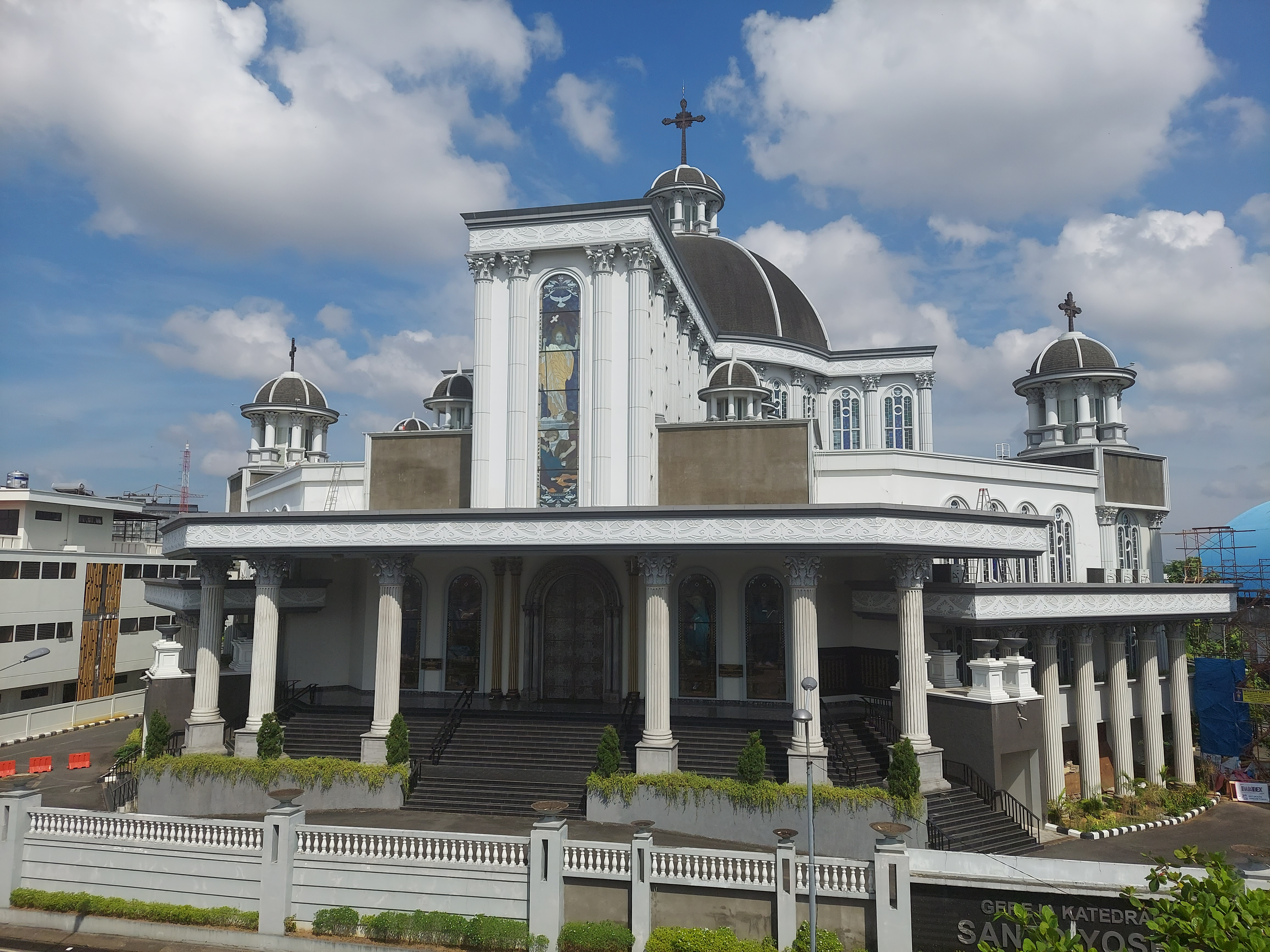
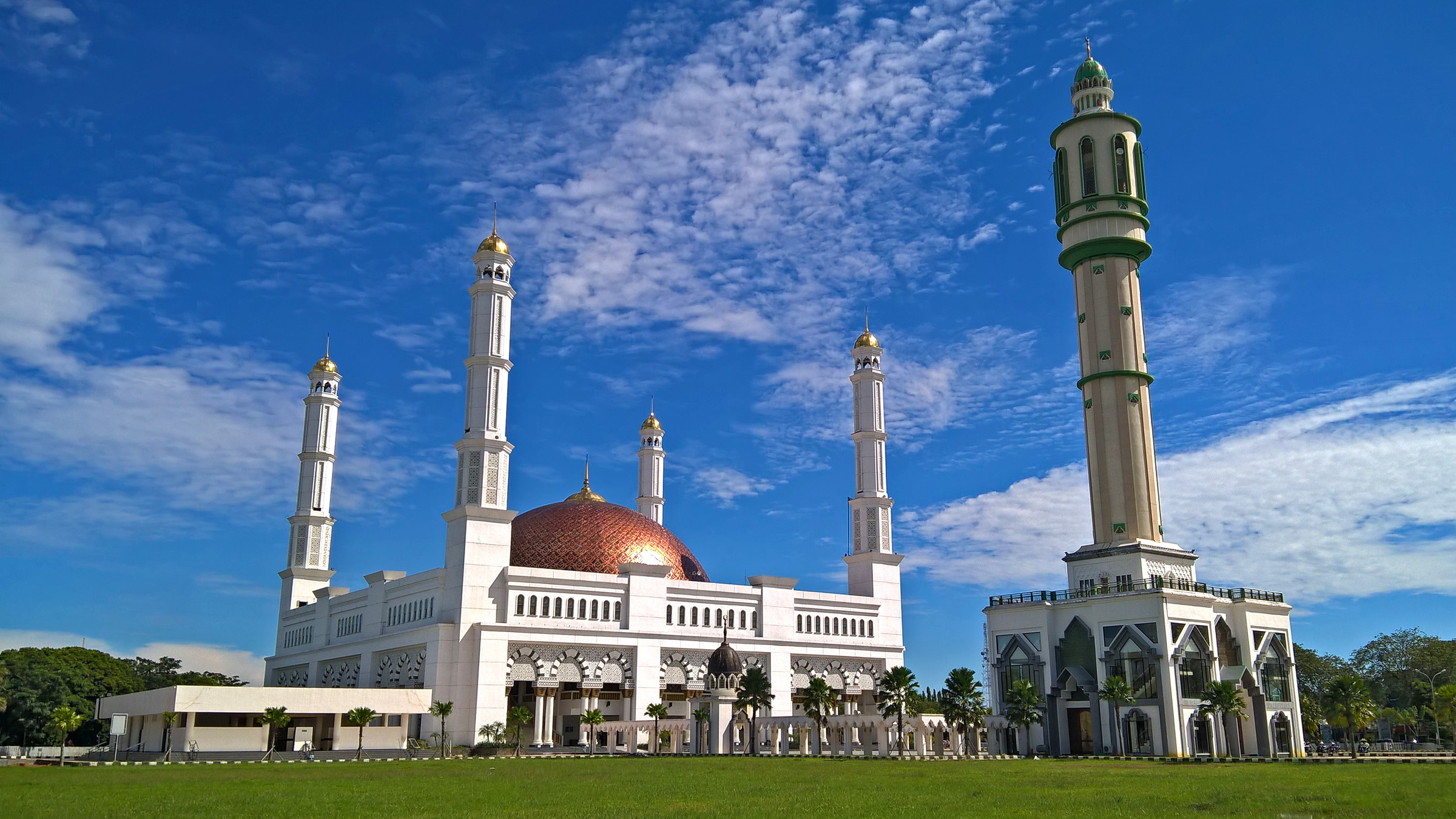
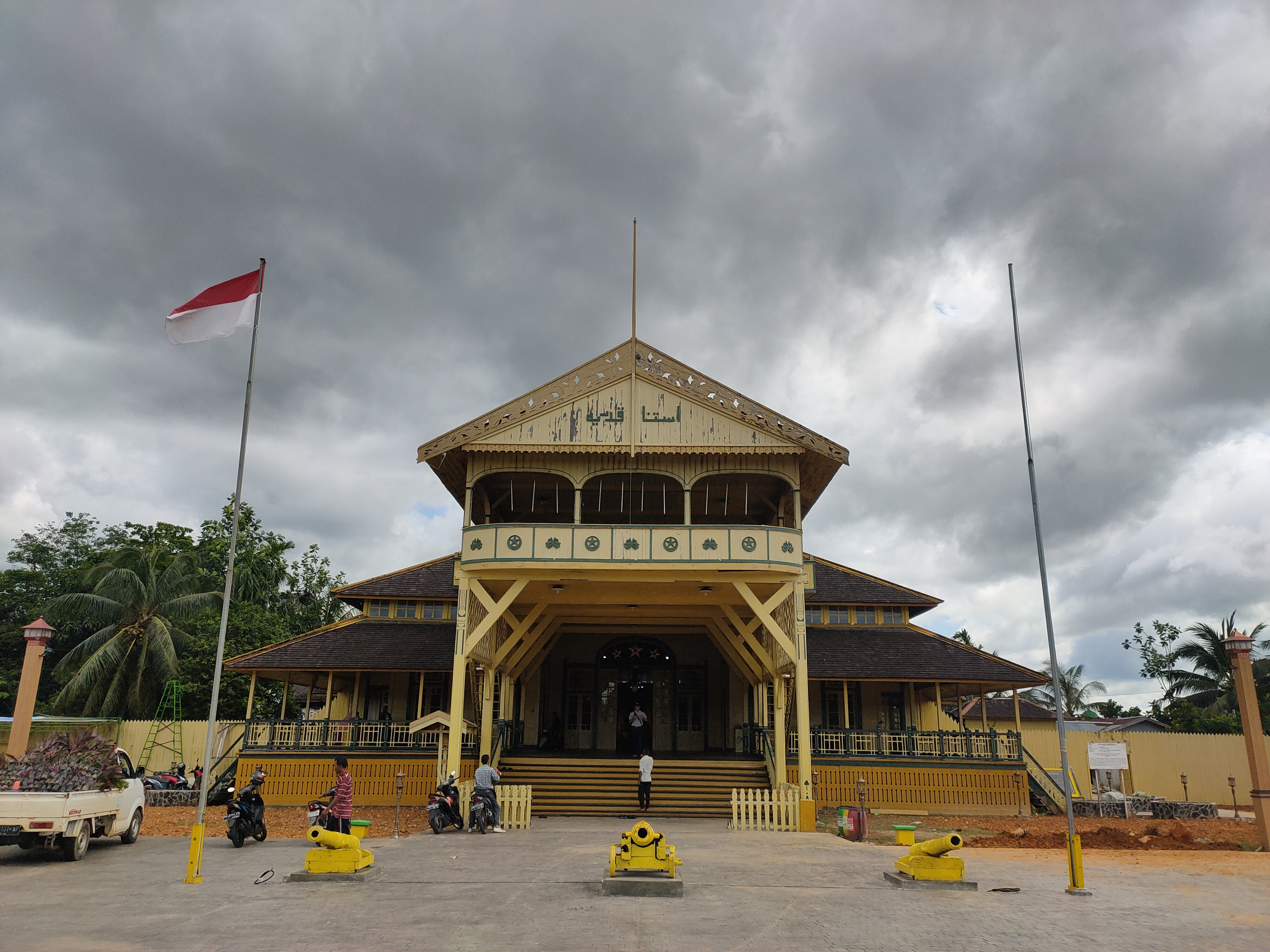
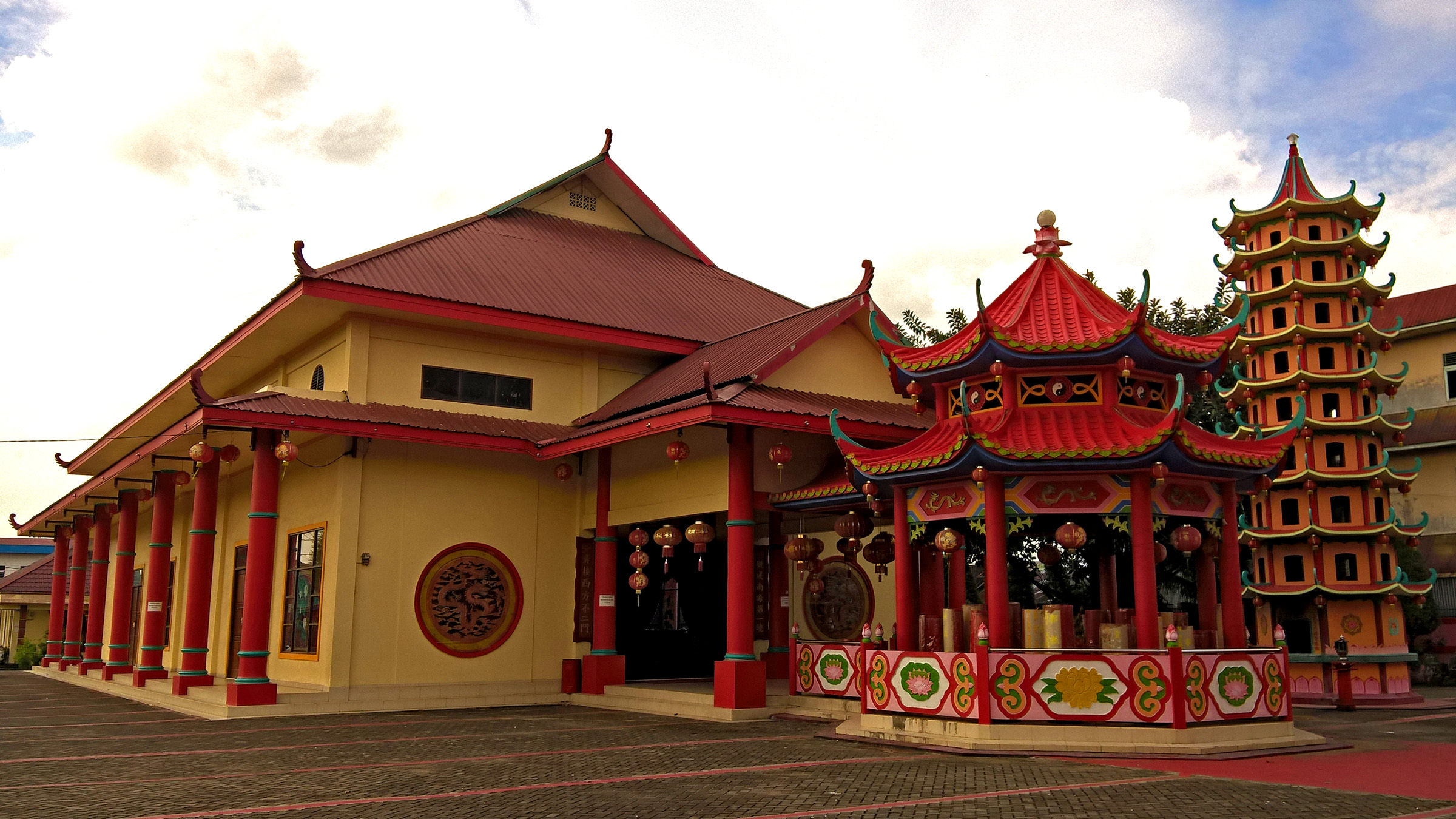
- Equator Pontianak Monument Saint Joseph's Cathedral Mujahidin Grand Mosque Keraton Kadriah Kwam Im temple

- Flag Seal
- Nicknames: Kota Khatulistiwa "Equatorial City"
- Motto(s): Pontianak Bersinar "Pontianak Shines"
- Location within West Kalimantan

- Location in Kalimantan and Indonesia Pontianak (Indonesia)
- Coordinates: 00°01′14″S 109°20′29″E
- Country: Indonesia
- Province: West Kalimantan
- Founded: 23 October 1771
- Settled: 5 July 1779
- Incorporated: 14 August 1946

Government
  - Mayor: Edi Rusdi Kamtono (Gerindra)
  - Vice Mayor: Bahasan
  - Legislature: Pontianak City Regional House of Representatives (DPRD)

Area
  - City of Pontianak: 118.21 km^{2} (45.64 sq mi)
- Elevation: 1 m (3.3 ft)
- Highest elevation: 1.91 m (6.3 ft)
- Lowest elevation: 0.81 m (2.7 ft)

Population (mid 2025 estimate)
  - City of Pontianak: 686,019
  - Density: 5,803.4/km^{2} (15,031/sq mi)
  - Demonym: Pontianakian
- Time zone: UTC+7 (IWST)
- Area code: (+62) 561
- Vehicle registration: KB
- HDI (2019): ▲0.794 (High)
- Website: pontianakkota.go.id

Pontianak

Chinese name
- Chinese: 坤甸
- Literal meaning: (Malay) a meaning "Pontianak (ghost)"
Transcriptions
Standard Mandarin
- Hanyu Pinyin: Kūndiān
Hakka
- Romanization: Khun-tîen
Yue: Cantonese
- Yale Romanization: Kwān dīn
- Jyutping: Kwan^{1} din^{6}
Southern Min
- Hokkien POJ: Khun-tiān
- Teochew Peng'im: Kung¹ diêng⁶
Eastern Min
- Fuzhou BUC: Kŏng-diêng

Malay name
- Malay: Pontianak (Rumi) ڤونتيانق (Jawi)

Pontianak, (Note: Indonesian pronunciation: [pon.ti.ˈa.nak] Pontianak Malay pronunciation: [pon.ti.ˈa.naʔ]) also known as Khuntien or 坤甸 (Kūn diān) in Teochew and Hakka, is the capital of the Indonesian province of West Kalimantan, founded first as a trading port on the island of Borneo, occupying an area of 118.21 km^{2} in the delta of the Kapuas River, at a point where it is joined by its major tributary, the Landak River. The city is precisely on the equator, hence it is widely known as Kota Khatulistiwa (Equatorial City). The city center is less than 3 kilometres (2 mi) south of the equator. Pontianak is the 23rd most populous city in Indonesia (as of 2023), and the fourth most populous city on the island of Borneo (Kalimantan) after Samarinda, Balikpapan and (Malaysia's) Kuching; it is now slightly ahead of Banjarmasin. It had a population of 658,685 at the 2020 Census within the city limits, with significant suburbs outside those limits, particularly in the regencies of Kubu Raya to the east and south of the city, and Mempawah to its north. The official estimate as of mid-2025 was 686,019 (comprising 342,880 males and 343,139 females - a gender ratio of 1:1.000755).

The city was founded as a small Malay fishing village at the mouth of the Kapuas River. It then became the seat of the Pontianak Sultanate for several centuries. Pontianak was then incorporated into the Dutch East Indies after an agreement between the Pontianak Sultanate and the Dutch Government. During the colonial era, Pontianak was the seat of the Residentie Westerafdeeling van Borneo, one of the residencies of the Dutch East Indies.

When the Japanese occupied the Dutch East Indies, Pontianak became the site of the Pontianak massacre, in which many Malay aristocrats and sultans as well as people from other ethnic groups (Particularly high profile Arabs and Chinese) were massacred by the Imperial Japanese Navy, especially in the Massacre of Mandor (Holocaust of Mandor).

After the Japanese surrendered, Pontianak became part of the Republic of Indonesia and was designated as the capital city of the province of West Kalimantan.

Pontianak is a multicultural city, as different ethnic groups such as the Dayak, Malay, Bugis people, and Chinese live in the city, with some immigrants such as Javanese, Madura people, Bataks, Ambon people, Papuans, and Manado people. This has created a culture that cannot be found in other parts of Indonesia. Various languages are spoken in Pontianak, such as Pontianak Malay, Dayak language and different dialects of Chinese and some varieties of Malays, Dayaks, Javanese, Bataks, and Bugis.

Pontianak is connected by air to other cities of Indonesia as well as some cities in Malaysia such as Kuala Lumpur and Kuching. Connected with the Supadio International Airport. Well paved roads of the Trans Kalimantan Road connect Pontianak to all cities in Kalimantan, such as Palangkaraya, Banjarmasin, Balikpapan, Samarinda, and Tanjung Selor. Other towns also connected in the Province of West Kalimantan, such as Ketapang, Singkawang, Sintang, etc., as well as other provinces. As Pontianak lies on the Trans Kalimantan Highway, it is possible to travel to East Malaysia and Brunei by land using the Trans Kalimantan Highway. Several bus routes operate from Pontianak to Kuching in Malaysia and Bandar Seri Begawan in Brunei Darussalam.

== Etymology ==
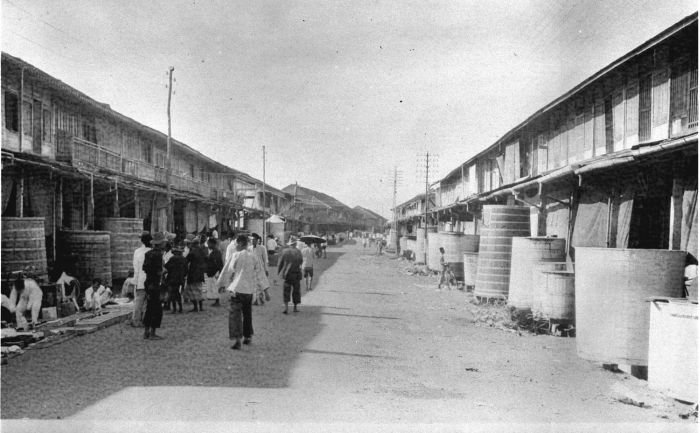
Pontianak, around 1920

The city was formerly the capital of the independent Sultanate of Pontianak and was founded on 23 October 1771 around an old trading station on the western coast of Borneo. It was built on swampy ground and tropical forest subjected to regular flooding by the river, requiring buildings to be constructed on piles to keep them off the ground. The name Pontianak refers to a story about ghosts that people in West Kalimantan refer to as Pontianak (a ferocious female ghost in Malay); it was a ghosts' haunt until Syarif Abdurrahman Alkadrie and his army fought and expelled the ghosts who attacked them by firing cannons. He then built a mosque and a palace, exactly on the location of the ghosts' haunt, and settled there. The mosque and palace became the first buildings in the city, and to this day locals fire bamboo cannons on Ramadan and other holidays in memory of this.

Pontianak in the Chinese language is known as 坤甸, ((pinyin): Kūndiàn) in the local Hakka Chinese, Pontianak is known as Khuntîen.

In Malay mythology, the Pontianak is also the name of an astral creature that is said be a spirit of a woman who died while pregnant. Similar stories about the Pontianak first emerged from mythical and folkloric tales that are popular in Kalimantan (Borneo) before the city was built on a large scale of natural habitat. This was an active ancient civilization in the late 17th century.

== History ==
=== Early development ===
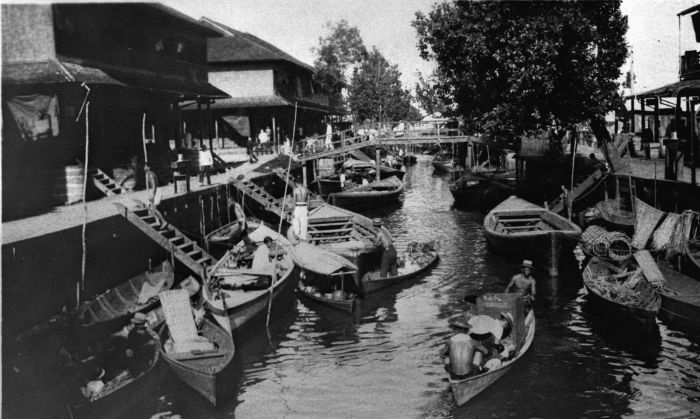
Boats along the quay of a canal in Pontianak, circa 1920

The history of the city of Pontianak written by a Dutch historian, V.J. Verth in his book Borneos Afdeling Wester, whose content is slightly different from the version of the stories circulating in the community today.

According to him, the Dutch started to go to Pontianak in 1773 from Batavia. Verth wrote that Syarif Abdurrahman, son of Sharif Hussein bin Ahmed cleric Alqadrie (or in another version called Al Habib Husin), left the Kingdom of Mempawah and began to wander. In the region of Banjarmasin, he married the sister of the sultan of Banjar, Sunan Nata Nature and was sworn in as prince. He was successful in commerce and accumulated enough capital to arm ships and boats and then started to take the fight against Dutch colonialism.

With the help of Sultan Sand, Syarif Abdurrahman then successfully hijacked Dutch ship near Bangka, also British and French ships in the port of Pasir. Abdurrahman became a rich man and then tried to establish a settlement on an island in the Kapuas River. He found branching Landak River and then to develop the area into a prosperous trading center. This is the region that is now called Pontianak. He then established the Sultanate of Pontianak with himself as the first sultan. The influential Arab-Malay writer, Abdullah al-Misri, was closely connected to the rulers of Pontianak at around this time.

The sultanate imported Chinese laborers in the 18th century to work in gold or tin mines. A number of mining companies (kongsi) enjoyed some political autonomy. As the Dutch were expanding its power on Borneo, in 1777, the Chinese declared the formation of the Lanfang Republic (Chinese: 蘭芳共和國), led by Luo Fangbo to oppose the Dutch attempt to colonize West Kalimantan, including Pontianak. The settlers subsequently elected Luo as their inaugural president. Luo implemented many democratic principles, including the idea that all matters of state must involve the consultation of the republic's citizenry. He also created a comprehensive set of executive, legislative, and judicial agencies. The Republic did not have a standing military, but had a defense ministry that administered a national militia based on conscription. During peacetime, the populace mostly engaged in farming, production, trading, and mining. Lanfang's administrative divisions included three tiers (province, prefecture, and county) with the people electing leaders for all levels. Lanfang was allied with Sultan Abdurrahman of the Pontianak Sultanate. Lanfang was also declared a tributary state of the Chinese Qing Empire.

=== Colonial rule ===
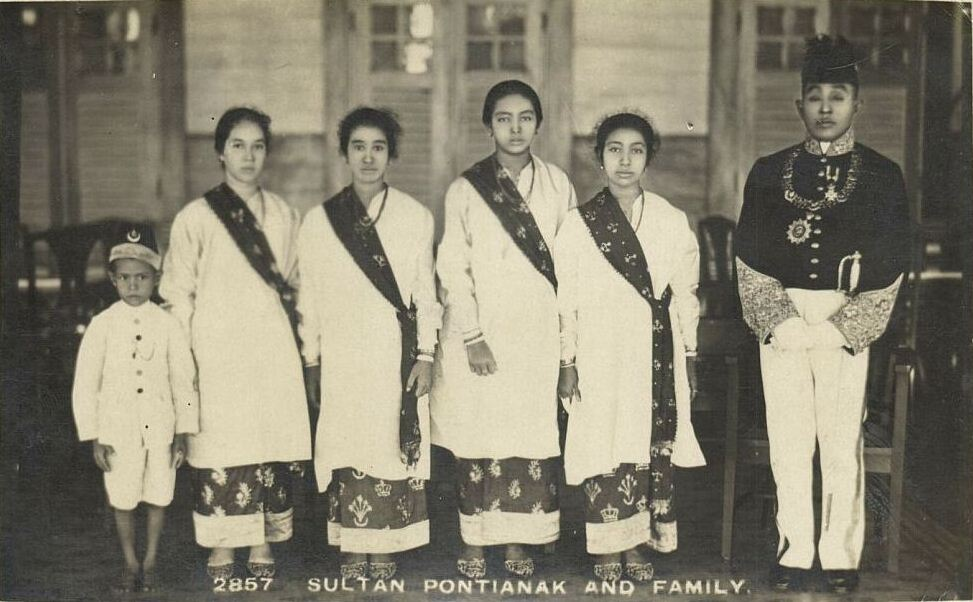
Sultan Syarif Muhammad Alkadrie of Pontianak and Family, circa 1920

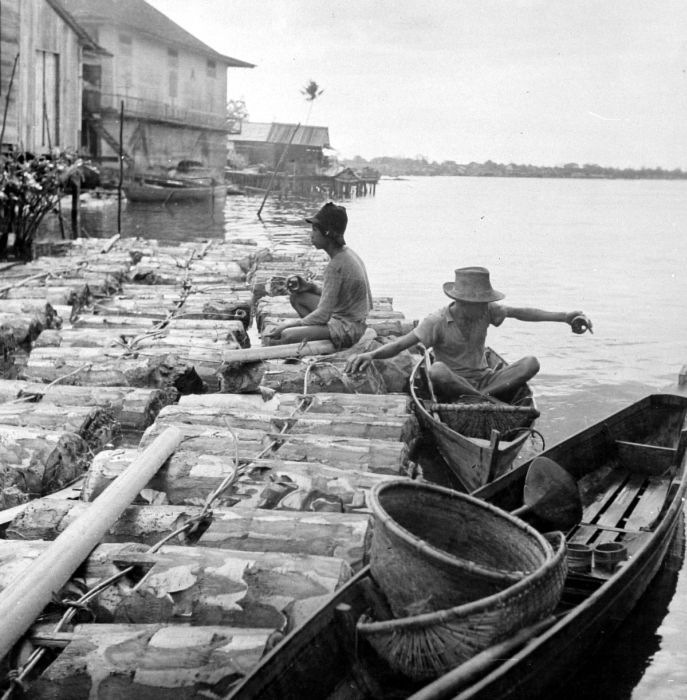
Capped sago trunks are plumbed downstream on the river at Pontianak, circa 1948.

Tropenmuseum's Coat of Arms of Pontianak designed based on the request from Sultan Hamid of Pontianak

In 1778, Dutch colonialists from Batavia entered Pontianak, led by Willem Ardinpola. The Netherlands occupied an area opposite the imperial palace now known as the Tanah Seribu or the Verkendepaal area.

On 5 July 1779, the Dutch made an agreement with the Sultanate of Pontianak regarding the Verkendepaal so that it would serve as the area of activities of the Dutch nation which later became the seat of government of Resident het Hoofd Westerafdeeling van Borneo (Regional Head residency of Borneo West) and Assistant Resident het Hoofd der Afdeeling van Pontianak (Resident assistant Chief of Pontianak regency). This area then became Controleur Onderafdeeling van het Hoofd Pontianak or Plaatselijk Bestuur van Pontianak. The Assistant Resident het Hoofd van der Afdeeling Pontianak (as a sort of regent of Pontianak) set the Plaatselijk Fonds. The agency manages government wealth and took care of tax funds.

The Dutch first recognized the independence of the Lanfang Republic. However, the Dutch decided to expand its territory in Borneo, This was resisted by the officials of Lanfang. In the mid-to-late 19th century, the Chinese Qing Empire weakened substantially and became increasingly unable to support the Lanfang Republic as its vassal state. The republic's citizenry waged a tenacious resistance, but ultimately failed due to poor weaponry. Lin Ah Sin was the last leader of Lanfang. Many of Lanfang's citizens and their descendants made their way to Sumatra or Singapore. The three campaigns waged by the Dutch East Indies Army against the Chinese kongsi, called the Kongsi Wars, were:

- Expedition to the West Coast of Borneo (1822–1824)
- Expedition against the Chinese in Montrado (1850–1854)
- Chinese uprising in Mandor, Borneo (1884–1885)

Due to being outnumbered and also with the lack of effective weaponry by the more superior and equipped Royal Netherlands East Indies Army, Lanfang finally surrendered to the Dutch in 1884 and was dissolved. Wary of Qing intervention, the Dutch did not openly annex the Lanfang Republic, and created another puppet regime. It was not until 1912, when the Qing Dynasty collapsed, that the Dutch proclaimed their occupation. Pontianak was then designated as the Residentie Westerafdeeling van Borneo, one of the different residencies of the Dutch East Indies.

In 1942, the Japanese occupied Pontianak and expelled the Dutch. The Japanese military government decided to allow the Pontianak Sultanate to remain. However, the Japanese soon become distrusted to the Sultanate, and between 1943 and 1944, Japanese troops did a mass arrest of Malay elites, Arabs, Chinese, Javanese, Menadonese, Dayaks, Bugis, Bataks, Minangkabau, Dutch, Indians, and Eurasians in Kalimantan, including all of the Malay Sultans, accused them of plotting to overthrow Japanese rule, and then massacred them. This is known as the Pontianak massacre.

After the surrender of Japan, a Dutch military court in Pontianak on 18 October 1947 convicted the Japanese Admiral Michiaki Kamada of war crimes and sentenced him to death.

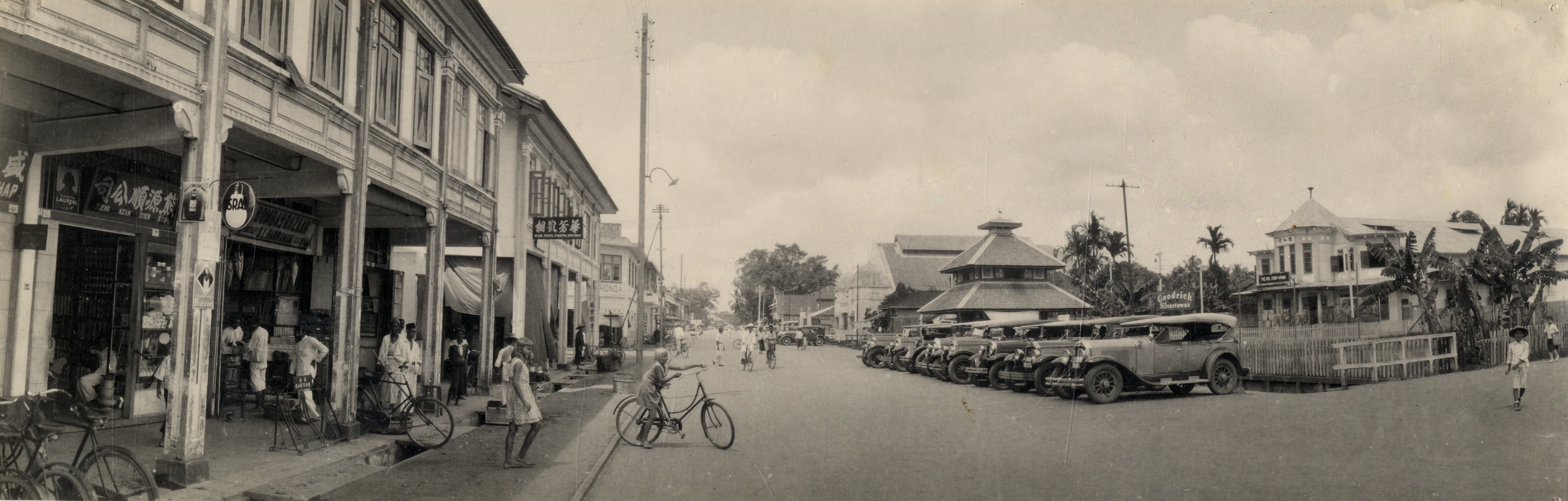
Front Street and the Chinese quarter in Pontianak, Borneo, 1934

=== Independence ===
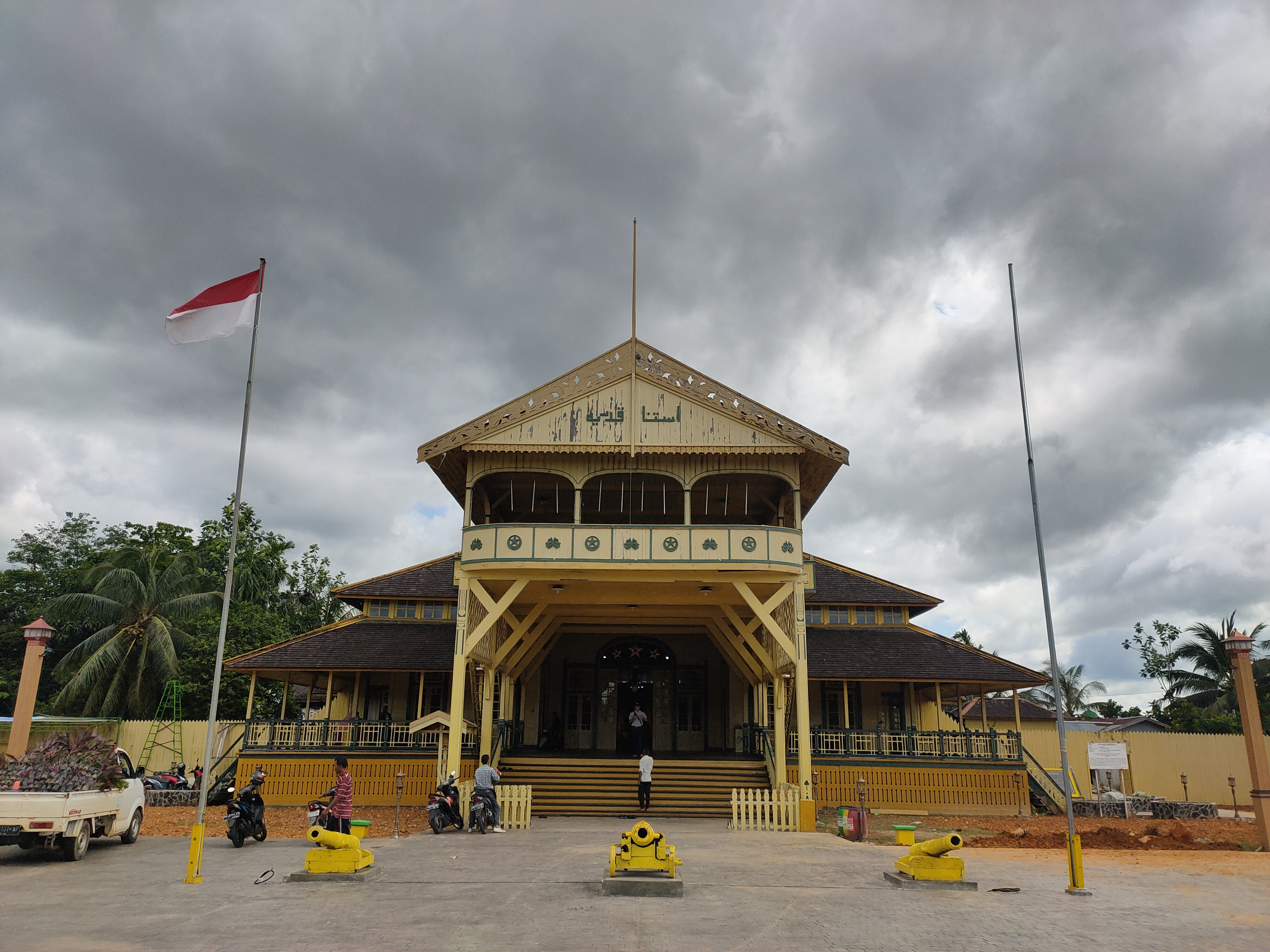
Kadariah Palace

After the Japanese surrendered, the Dutch returned to Pontianak. Due to international opposition to Dutch attempts to reinstate control over Indonesia in the United Nations, the Dutch were forced to recognise Sukarno's Republic as the de facto government of Java and Sumatra and to grant independence to a Republic of the United States of Indonesia (RUSI) on 27 December 1949. Pontianak became the capital of the State of West Kalimantan, one of the federal states of the United States of Indonesia. It was led by Sultan Hamid II, the last sultan of the Pontianak Sultanate. However, Hamid II was accused of conspiring with the former KNIL Captain Raymond Westerling to organise an anti-Republican coup in Bandung and Jakarta. Hamid's role in the coup led to increased agitation in West Kalimantan for its integration into the Republic of Indonesia.

Following a fact-finding mission by the Government Commission, the RUSI House of Representatives voted by 50 votes to one to merge West Kalimantan into the Republic of Indonesia. Following clashes with demobilised KNIL troops in Makassar and the attempted secession of an Ambonese Republic of South Moluccas, the federal United States of Indonesia was dissolved on 17 August 1950, turning Indonesia into a unitary state dominated by the central government in Jakarta. Pontianak then became the capital city of the new province of West Kalimantan.

== Geography ==
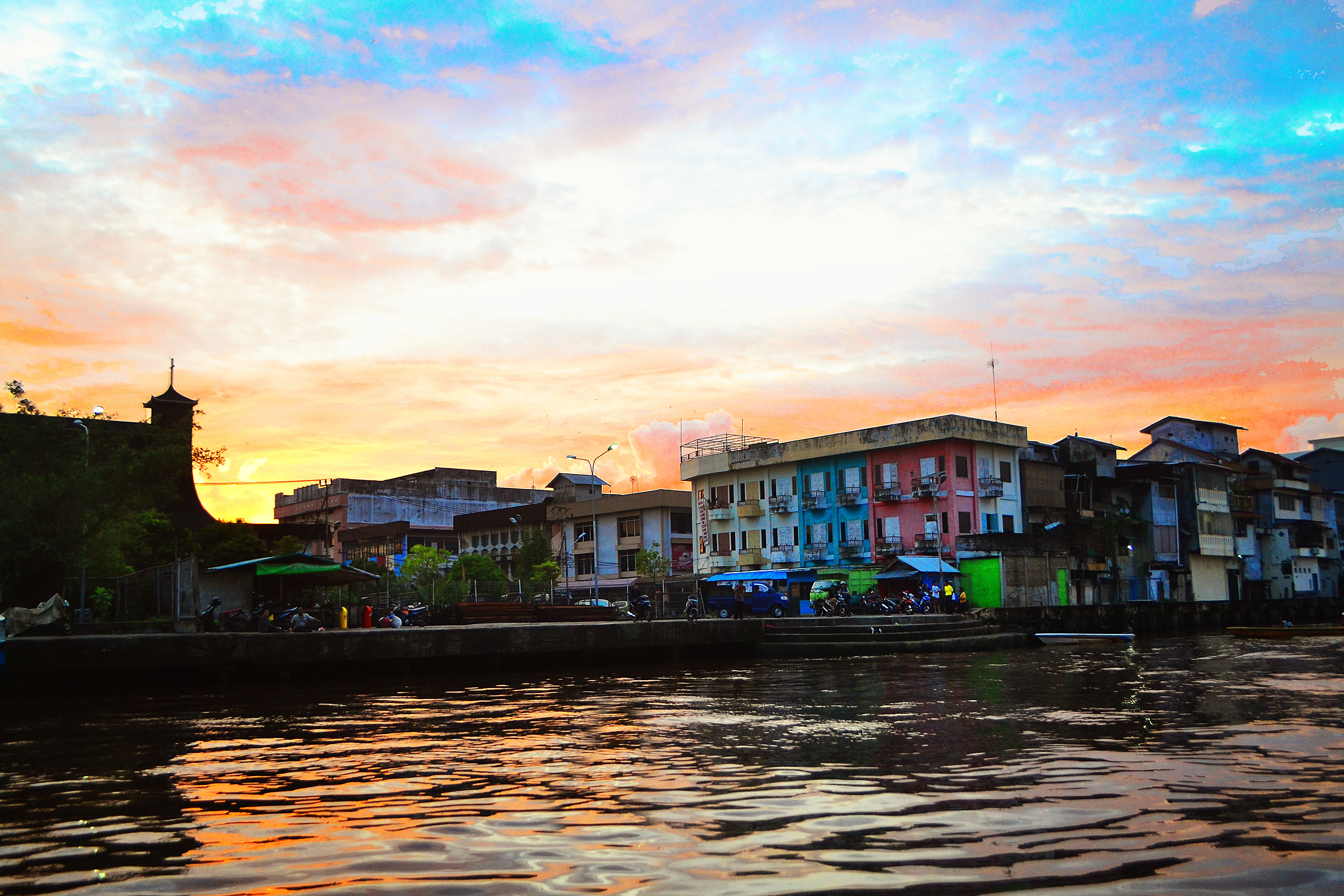
The Seng Hie port, the oldest port in Pontianak, lies along the banks of Kapuas river.

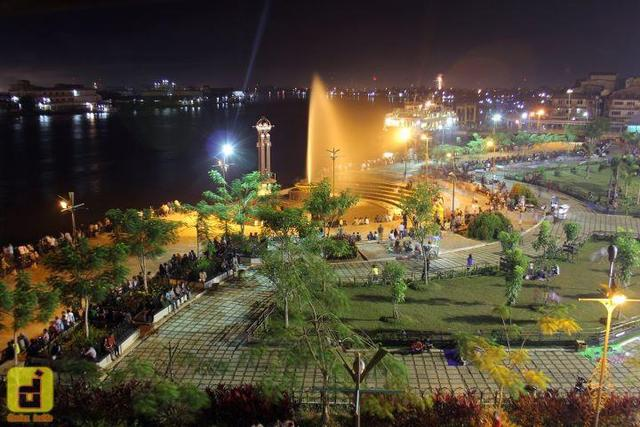
Pontianak Town park

Pontianak lies on the equator at a height ranging from 0.1 to 1.5 meters above sea level. It is divided into three parts by the Kapuas Besar and its major tributaries – the Kapuas Kecil and Landak rivers. The city lies on flat land in the delta of the Kapuas River with a ground level elevation ranging from 0.1 to 1.9 meters above sea level.

The city is built on fall peneplain and alluvial sediments that are physically a clay type. This type of soil is in the form of peat and silt deposits of Kapuas river. Under these conditions, the soil is very unstable and has a very low carrying capacity. The soil composition along the river is formed from a precipitation process that produces a tropaquent area coupled with tropofluevent and under permanently saturated fluvawuent conditions. It is derived from the new sapphire sediment from various compositions and shapes, including organic matter.

Pontianak consists of a kind of soil organosol, gray, humus, and alluvial with different characteristics. At some points, the thickness of the peat soils reaches up to 1–6 meters, thus causing a poor carrying capacity if it is designated to construct large buildings to make it as a farm.

=== Time zone ===
Singapore, Kalimantan and storm clouds over the South China Sea, October 28, 2026. Lights of Pontianak at right center.

In 1963 by Presidential Decree No. 243, the city entered into the Central Indonesian Time (WITA) zone (GMT+8).

On 1 January 1988 by Presidential Decree No. 41, West Kalimantan (together with Central Kalimantan) moved back 1 hour from the Central Indonesian Time (WITA) zone, to the Western Indonesian Time (WIB) zone. As such, in 1988 the city of Pontianak celebrated the New Year twice: at 00:00 on GMT+8 and then 00:00 on GMT+7.

=== Climate ===
Pontianak features a tropical rainforest climate (Af under the Köppen climate classification) with no distinct seasons at all and with heavy to very heavy rainfall year-round. The city experiences a large amount of rainfall throughout the year, averaging 2,934 millimetres or 116 inches of precipitation annually. Only in the months from June to September does the average monthly precipitation fall below 250 millimetres or 10 inches. Temperatures are consistent throughout the course of the year, with average high temperatures of 32 °C (89.6 °F) and average low temperatures of 23.3 °C (73.9 °F).

Climate data for Pontianak (Supadio International Airport) (1991–2020 normals, extremes 2006–2023)
Month	Jan	Feb	Mar	Apr	May	Jun	Jul	Aug	Sep	Oct	Nov	Dec	Year
Mean daily maximum °C (°F)	31.6 (88.9)	31.8 (89.2)	32.1 (89.8)	32.3 (90.1)	32.4 (90.3)	32.3 (90.1)	32.1 (89.8)	32.3 (90.1)	32.2 (90.0)	31.9 (89.4)	31.7 (89.1)	31.4 (88.5)	32.0 (89.6)
Daily mean °C (°F)	25.9 (78.6)	26.0 (78.8)	26.4 (79.5)	26.6 (79.9)	26.9 (80.4)	26.8 (80.2)	26.5 (79.7)	26.6 (79.9)	26.4 (79.5)	26.1 (79.0)	26.0 (78.8)	25.9 (78.6)	26.3 (79.3)
Mean daily minimum °C (°F)	23.1 (73.6)	23.1 (73.6)	23.3 (73.9)	23.6 (74.5)	23.7 (74.7)	23.4 (74.1)	23.0 (73.4)	23.1 (73.6)	23.2 (73.8)	23.3 (73.9)	23.3 (73.9)	23.2 (73.8)	23.3 (73.9)
Average rainfall mm (inches)	281.2 (11.07)	216.9 (8.54)	233.4 (9.19)	269.8 (10.62)	255.9 (10.07)	203.2 (8.00)	182.0 (7.17)	161.9 (6.37)	175.2 (6.90)	311.4 (12.26)	331.2 (13.04)	312.1 (12.29)	2,934.2 (115.52)
Average rainy days (≥ 1.0 mm)	16.6	13.6	15.0	16.5	17.1	12.6	11.7	11.0	13.2	19.2	20.7	19.6	186.8
Source 1: World Meteorological Organization
Source 2: Starlings Roost Weather (extremes)

== Administrative divisions ==
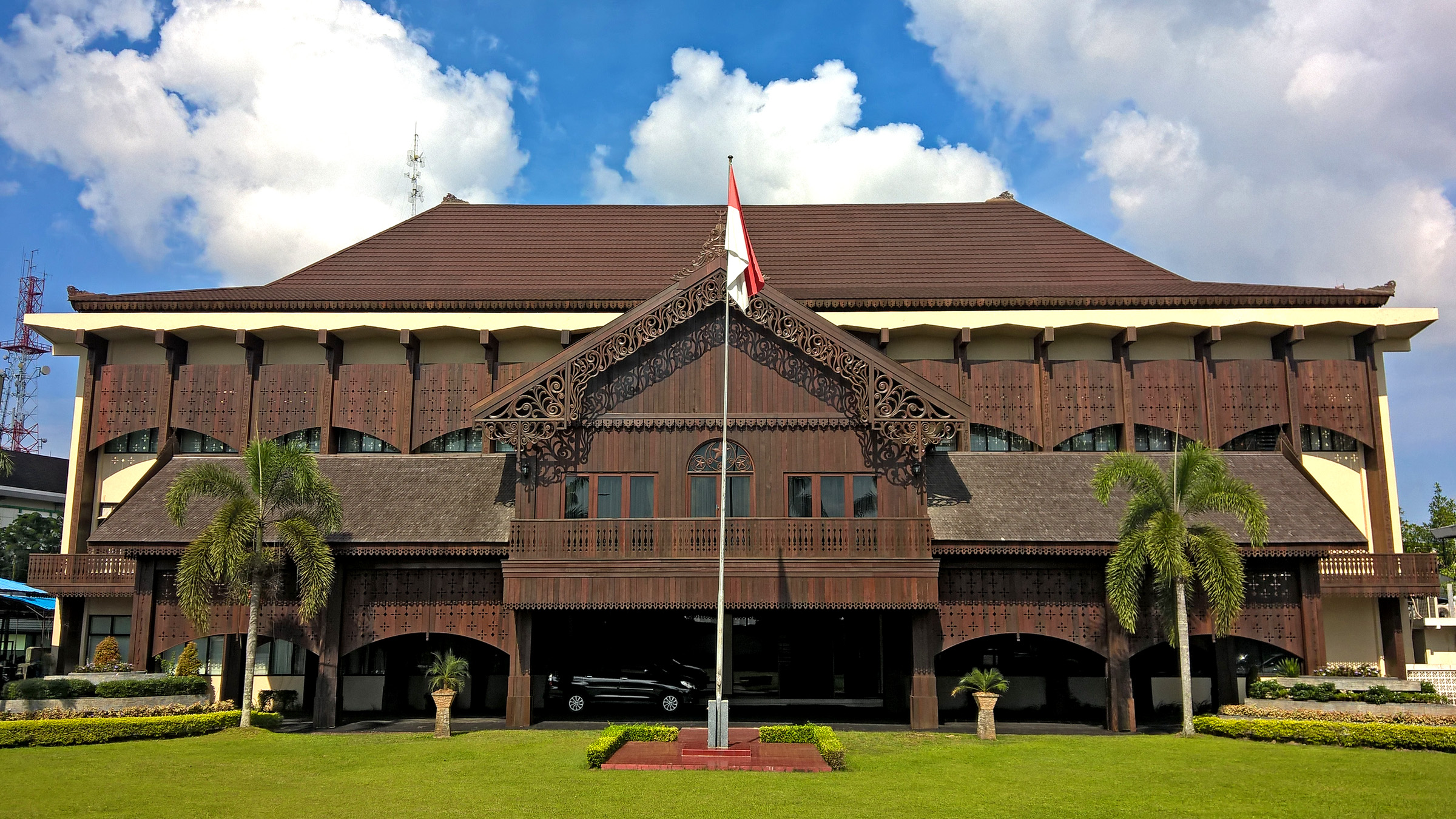
Pontianak City Hall

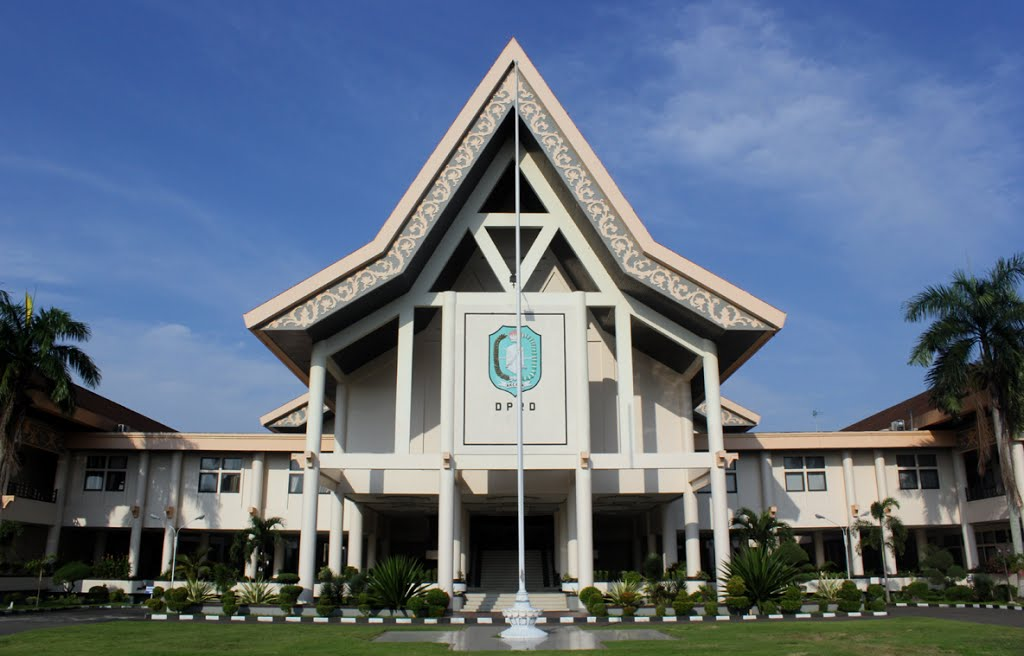
The West Kalimantan Council (DPRD) building

Pontianak City comprises six administrative districts (kecamatan), listed below with their areas and their populations at the 2010 Census and the 2020 Census, together with the official estimates as at mid 2025. The table also includes the number of urban villages (all classed as urban kelurahan) in each district, and its post code.

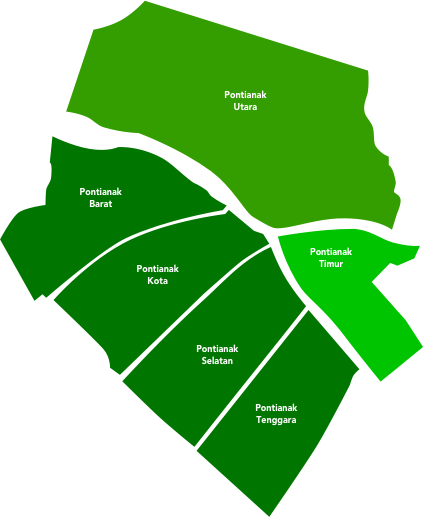

Kode Wilayah	Name of District (kecamatan)	Area in km^{2}	Pop'n Census 2010	Pop'n Census 2020	Pop'n Estimate mid 2025	No. of urban villages	Post code
61.71.01	Pontianak Selatan (South Pontianak)	16.52	81,821	90,839	91,483	5	78123 & 78124
61.71.06	Pontianak Tenggara (Southeast Pontianak)	16.13	44,856	49,127	49,189	4	78124
61.71.02	Pontianak Timur (East Pontianak)	12.06	82,370	105,787	114,199	7	78132 – 78136
61.71.03	Pontianak Barat (West Pontianak)	16.38	123,029	146,700	152,877	4	78113 – 78136
61.71.05	Pontianak Kota (Pontianak Town)	16.02	110,111	123,028	124,282	6	78111 – 78117
61.71.04	Pontianak Utara (North Pontianak)	41.10	112,577	143,204	153,989	4	78241 – 78244
	Totals	118.21	554,764	658,685	686,019	29	

The first four of the above districts lie on the south bank of the Kapuas River (listed from west to east), while the last two districts lie on the north bank (the East and North districts are separated by the Landak River, which joins with the Kapuas Kecil River at this point to create the Kapuas Besar River). The built-up or urbanized area continues southeastwards along the south bank of the Kapuas River into the "town" of Sungai Raya, now sub-divided into 13 desa which comprise the urbanised northwestern part of Sungai Raya District of Kubu Raya Regency.

== Demographics ==
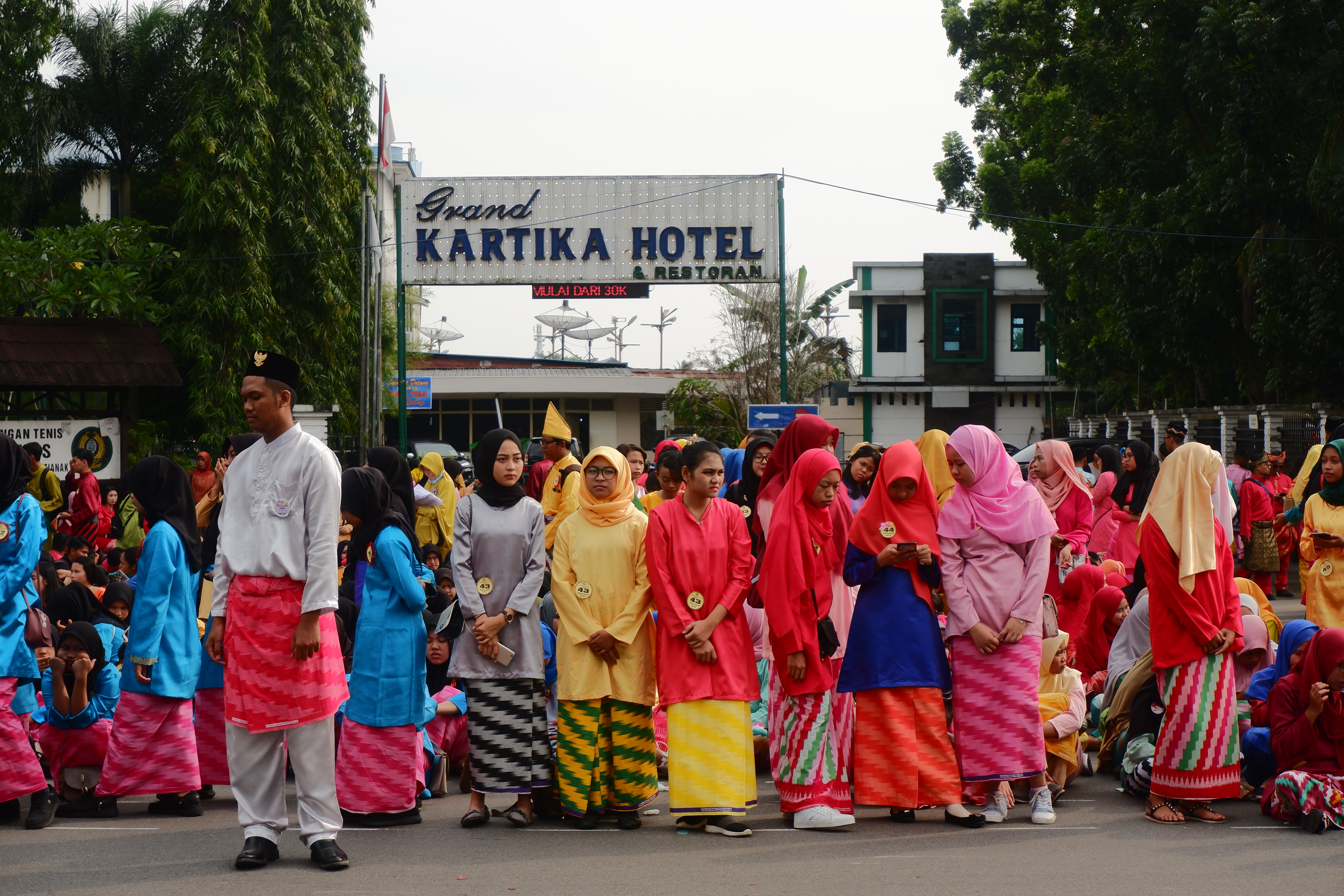
The Malay people in Pontianak, wearing traditional costume

The 2010 census enumerated Pontianak's population at 554,764, while the 2020 Census resulted in a population of 658,685; the latest official estimate (as at mid 2024) is 686,019.

Researchers conducted research on population data in the city of Pontianak during the years from 2010 onwards, collected by the Central Bureau of Statistics (BPS) Pontianak by accessing the data online. According to the data obtained, the population growth rate in Pontianak City in 1990–2000 is 0.7 percent per year, while for the period 2000-2010 increased to 1.8 percent per year; the average for 2020-2025 was 0.86 percent per year.

=== Ethnicities ===
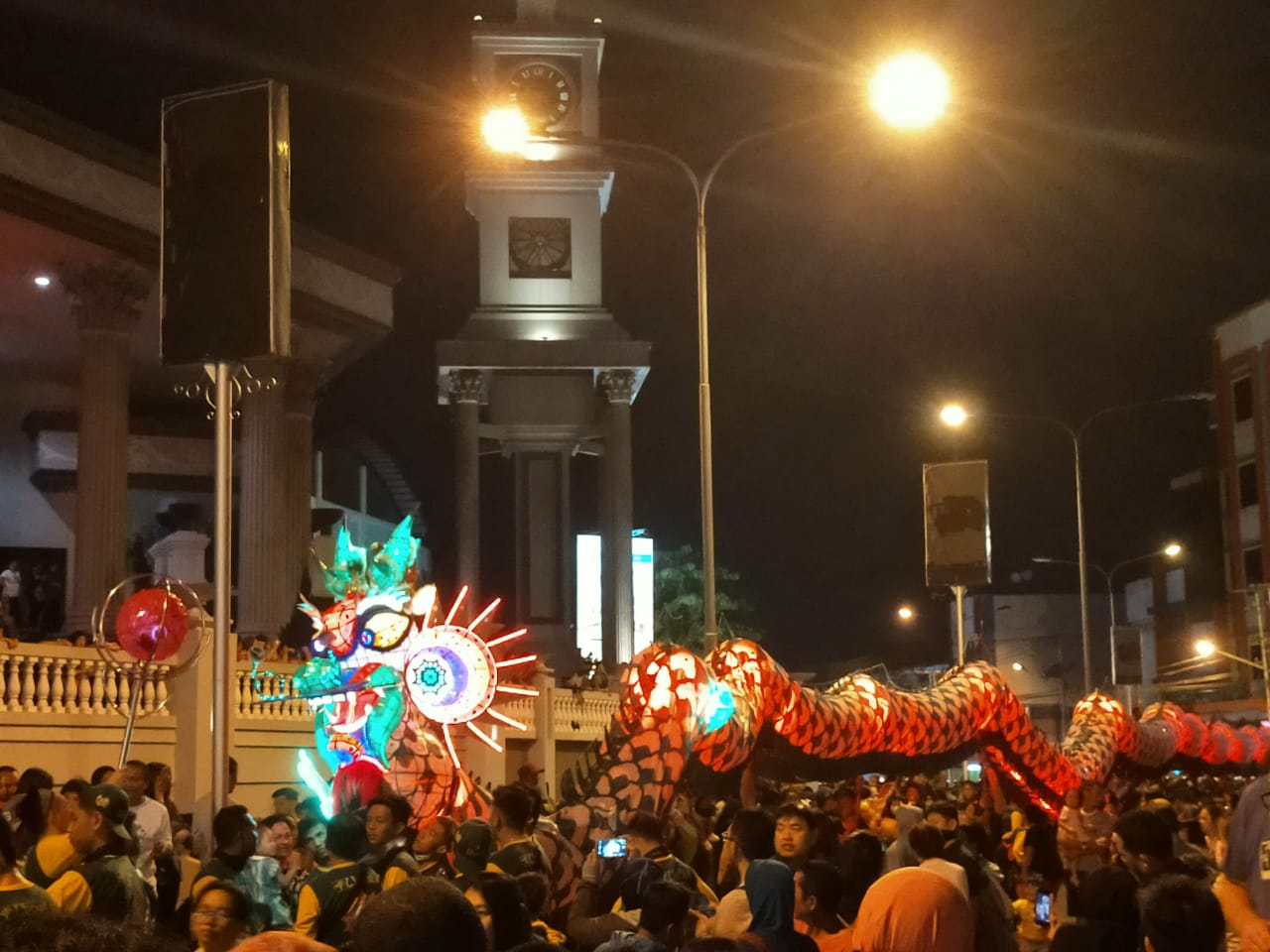
The Chinese celebrate Cap Go Meh festival in Pontianak.

Currently (as of 2026), the website of Statistics Indonesia for Pontianak City (BPS Kota Pontianak) does not show ethnic composition in its population data. The BPS data below was reported by news sites in 2019, and again in 2022:

Ethnic groups in Pontianak
Ethnicity	Percentage
Malay	30.50%
Chinese	29.81%
Dayak	18.92%
Javanese	12.84%
Madurese	4.96%
Others	2.98%

In 2009, the government website of Pontianak City posted this ethnicity data:

Ethnic groups in Pontianak
Ethnicity	Percentage (%)
Chinese descent	32.24
Malay	31.05
Dayak	13.12
Javanese	11.67
Madurese	3.35
Others	4.57
TOTAL	100 [sic]

Intermarriage between different ethnic groups is common in Pontianak.

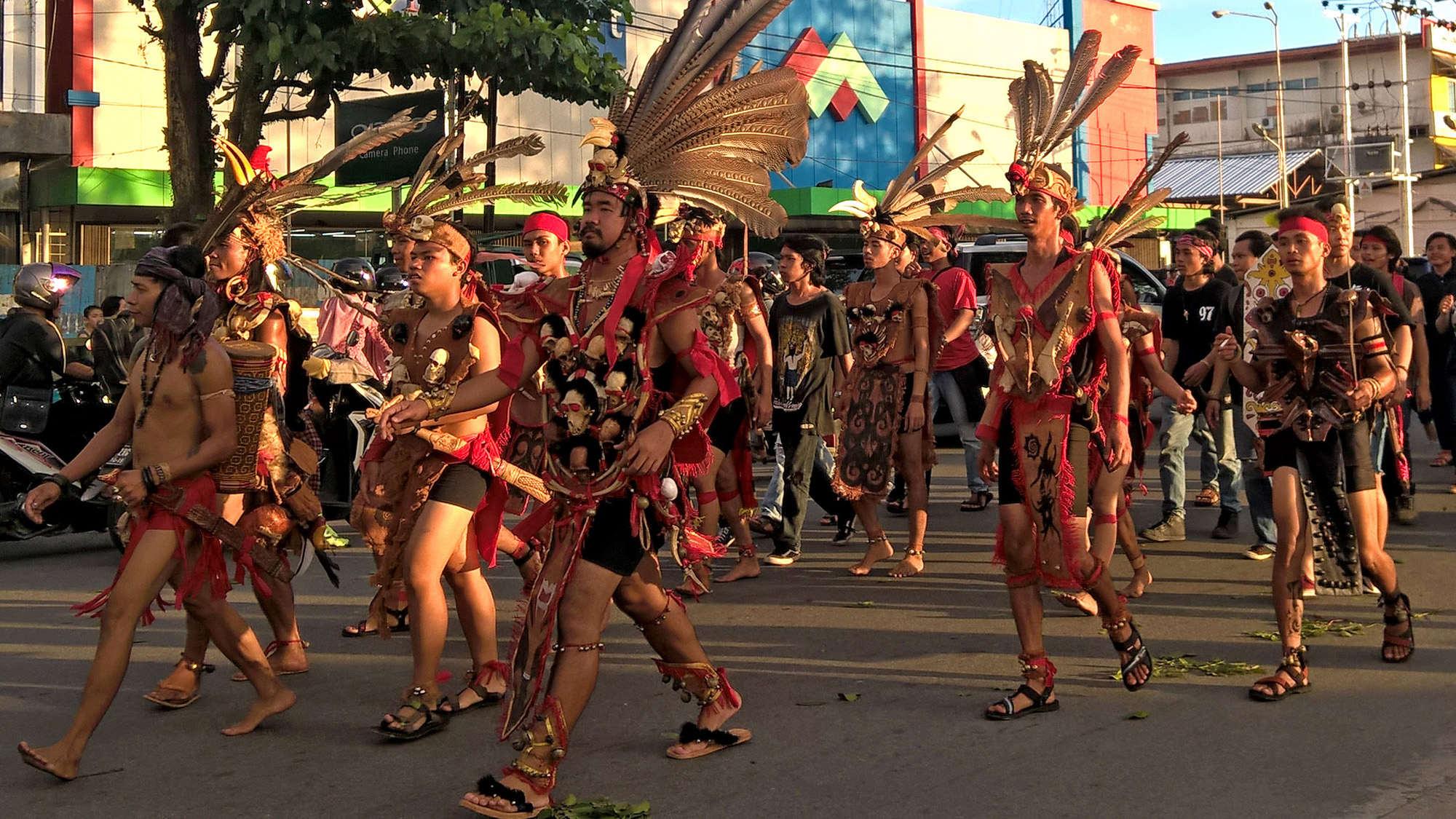
Gawai Dayak Festival in Pontianak

Compared to other Indonesian cities, Pontianak is one of the few cities with a significant number of Chinese Indonesians. The Chinese have lived in Pontianak for centuries. Most of the Chinese were passing through west Borneo from the third century for a last rest on their sailing journeys before returning to China. Beginning in the 7th century many Chinese had started to trade in western Borneo. Apart from the Chinese traders, in the 17th century Dutch colonization brought in mass Chinese for mining gold. Most of these Chinese miners originated from the Fujian or Guangdong provinces.

The two largest sub-groups of the Pontianak Chinese are the Teochew and Hakka. The Teochew people are from the northeastern coast of Guangdong and Hakka people from the interior of Fujian come to West Kalimantan. The Hakka people are pioneer groups living in villages and mining areas, working as miners, farmers, and also small traders. This is in contrast to the Teochew people who prefer to live in urban areas for trade. Even now the Teochew people form the largest ethnic Chinese population in the city of Pontianak and south of Pontianak. The Hakka people mostly live in the northern area of Pontianak.

The second largest ethnic group in Pontianak is the Malay people. The Pontianak Malay are one of the early inhabitants of the city. Pontianak was the seat of the Pontianak Sultanate, a great Malay kingdom for centuries. The Malay people mostly live on the bank of the Kapuas River and other rivers in Pontianak. They also live in coastal areas of the city. Most of the Pontianak Malay work as traders, government officials, and in other jobs.

Other significant ethnic groups living in Pontianak are the Dayak, Bugis, Madurese, and Javanese. Most of the Dayak living in Pontianak are the indigenous/native people of the interior part of West Kalimantan. Some of the Dayak still practice animism, which involves traditional rituals and dances. However, most of the Dayaks have converted to Christianity and are more urbanized. The Bugis, Javanese, and Madurese are immigrants from other parts of Indonesia. They migrated to Pontianak due to the Transmigration program enacted by the Dutch and continued during the New Order. Conflicts often erupted between the Madurese and the Dayak.

=== Language ===
Indonesian is the official language of Pontianak as well as other parts of Indonesia. The native language and main lingua franca of the city is Pontianak Malay, a distinct variety of Malay that is closely related to Johor-Riau Malay in Malaysia, Riau, and the Riau Islands in Indonesia and Singapore. As an example of the differences between Pontianak Malay and Indonesian, they use kamek instead of kami (lit. 'I, me'), and kitak instead of kalian (lit. 'you'), which is more similar to Sarawak Malay, given their proximity. However, many people in the city also use Indonesian as their second language.

The other prevailing language family in Pontianak is Chinese. The most widely spoken varieties of Chinese in Pontianak are Teochew and Hakka. Teochew is a variety of Southern Min originating from Guangdong. It is mostly mutually intelligible with Hokkien. Teochew is mostly spoken in the central and southern parts of the city, as well as suburbs south of the city. Hakka is spoken in the northern part of the city, as well as in suburbs north of the city. There are more Teochew speakers than Hakka speakers in Pontianak. These varieties of Chinese have been influenced by local languages such as Malay and Indonesian. Therefore, native speakers from China may find it difficult to communicate using Teochew and Hakka with the people from Pontianak. Other Chinese varieties such as Cantonese and Hokkien have fewer speakers.

Other languages such as the Javanese, Madurese, Buginese, and different dialects of Dayak are also spoken.

=== Religion ===
The majority of the population are Muslims (63.4%); the rest are Buddhists (23.2%), Catholics (9.1%), Protestants (3.2%), Confucians (1.3%), Hindus (0.1%), and others (0.1%). Most of the Muslims are Malay, Javanese, Madurese, etc. While most of the people who adhere to Buddhism and Confucianism are Chinese Indonesian, many Chinese also adhere to Christianity. The Dayak people adhere to either Catholicism or Protestantism, while also incorporating local beliefs. Some of the Dayak also adheres to Kaharingan, a local folk religion. However, the Indonesian government does not recognize Kaharingan as a religion and therefore classifies those who adhere to Kaharingan beliefs as Hindus.

Several places of worship are located in Pontianak, such as the Jami Mosque of Pontianak, which is considered the great mosque of Pontianak. Located in the complex of the palace of the former Pontianak Sultanate, this mosque is the oldest mosque and is one of the two buildings that witnessed the establishment of the city of Pontianak. At first, this mosque was also used as a center of government for the Sultanate of Pontianak. The name of this mosque was given by Syarif Usman Alkadri who is the son of Sultan Sharif Abdurrahman, who continued the construction of the mosque until it was completed.

Other places of worship are the Cathedral of Saint Joseph, Pura Giripati Mulawarman, Vihara Budhisatva Karaniya Metta, and the Pontianak Congregation of West Kalimantan Christian Church. Some of these have existed since the Dutch colonial era, while some are constructed by the Indonesian government.

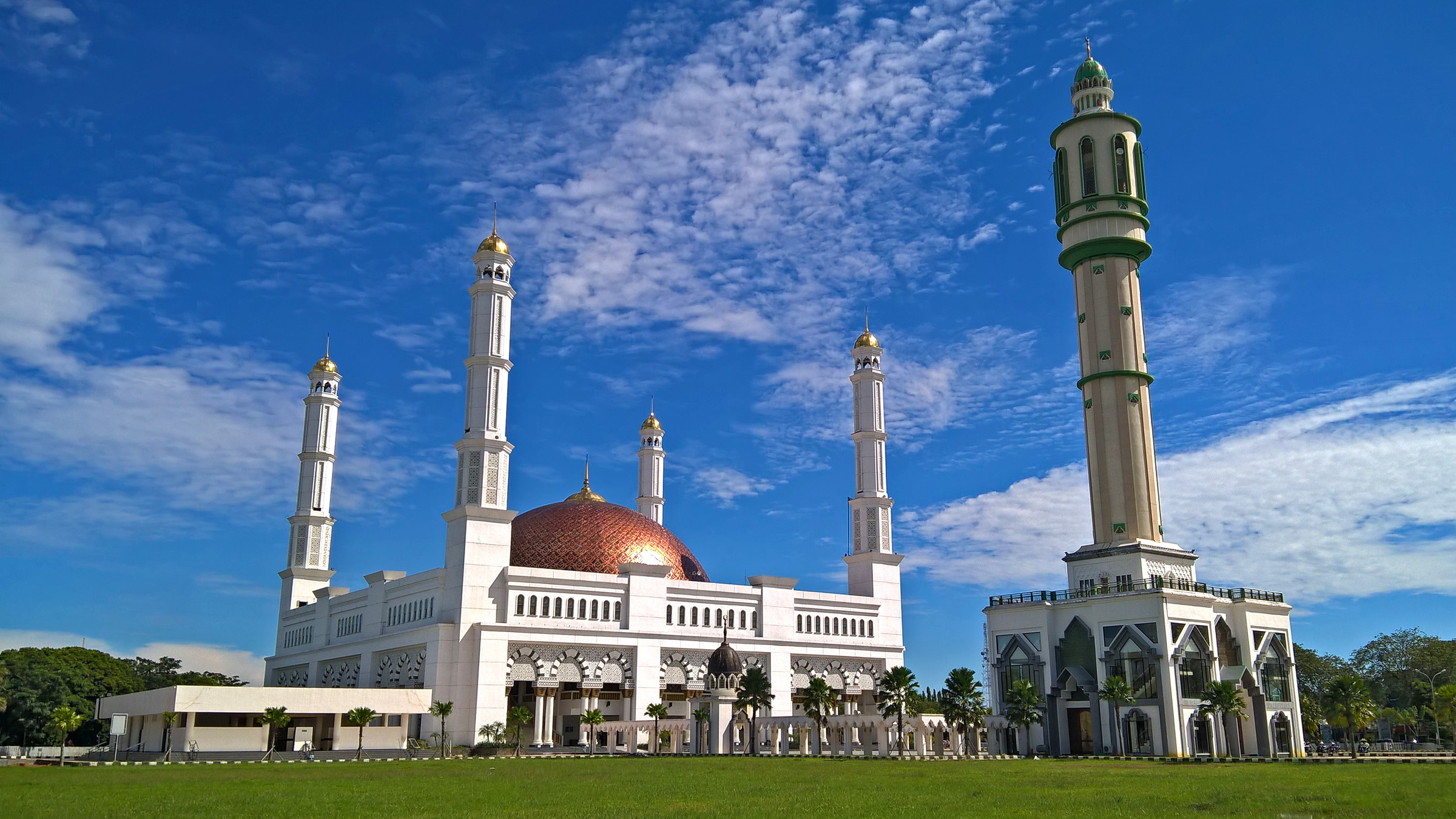
Mujahidin Grand Mosque, the largest mosque in Pontianak

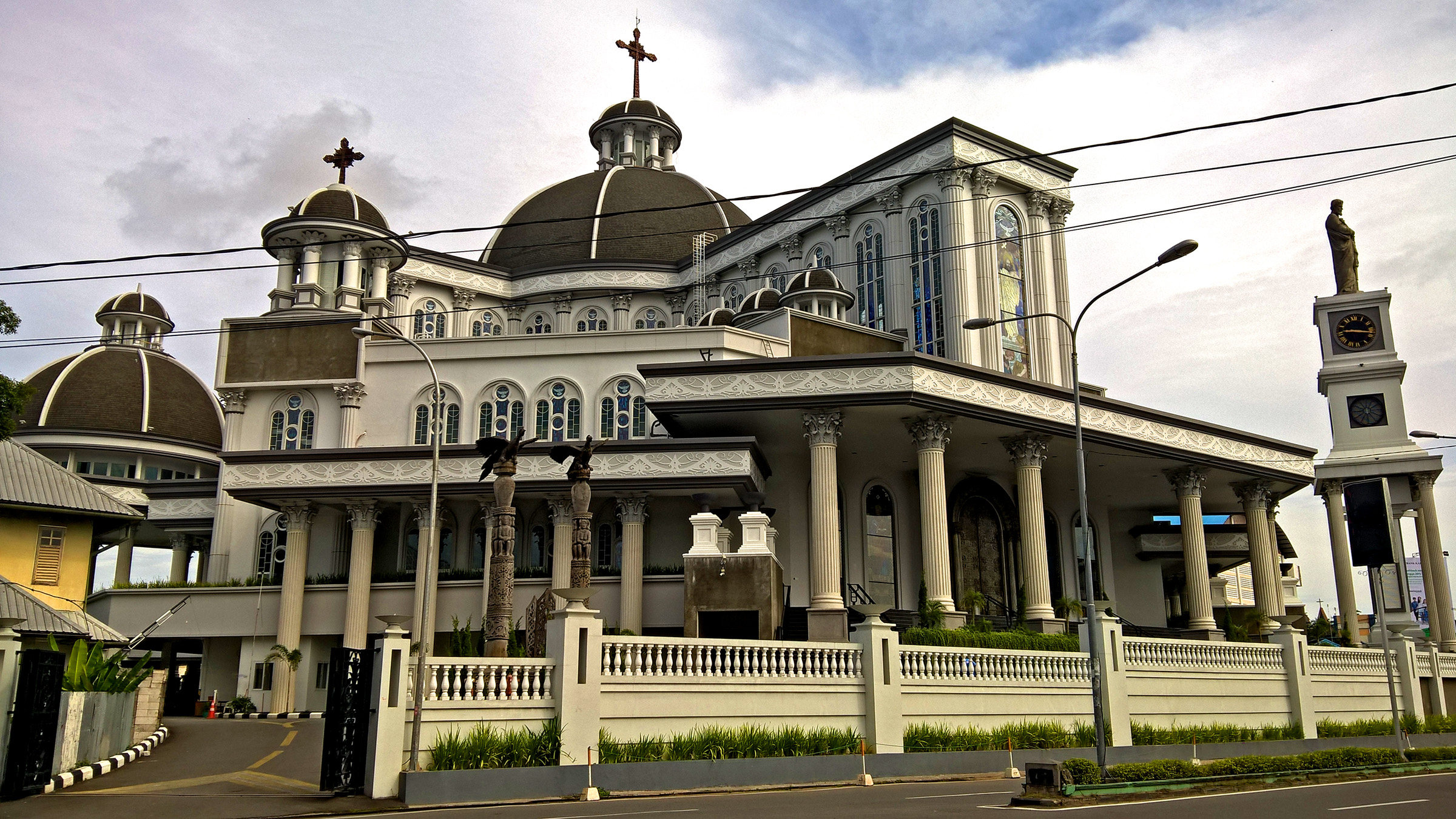
Santo Yosef cathedral

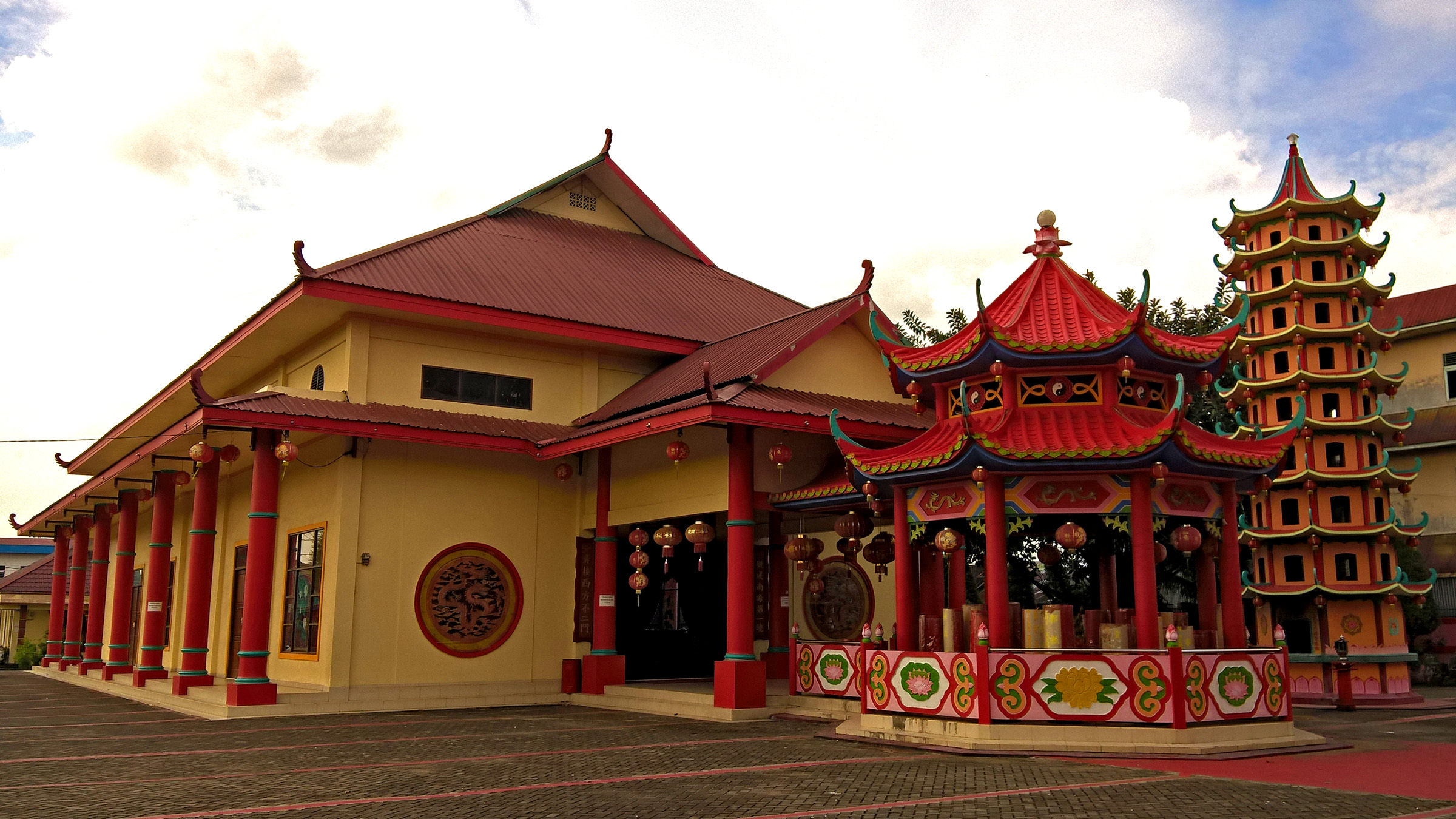
Kwan Im Chinese temple

== Economy ==
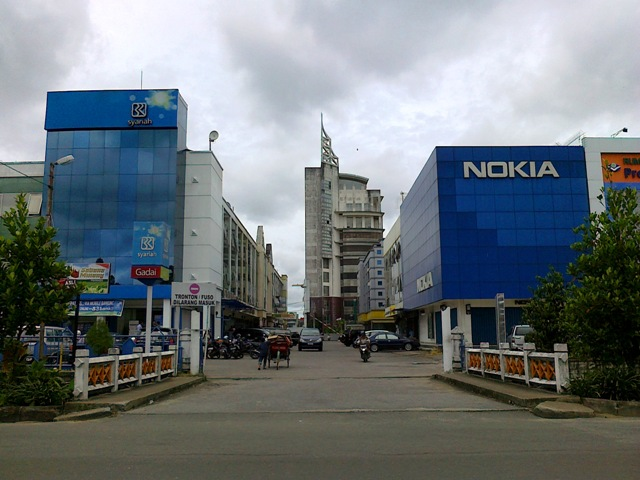
Pontianak Town center

Equator monument

The gross regional domestic product of Pontianak City, according to the ADHK 2010 business field in 2015, reached 20.80 trillion rupiah. When compared to 2014, the production volume of goods and services produced in Pontianak City in 2015 increased by 0.96 trillion rupiah, or by 4.84 percent. Most of Pontianak city's economy relies on industry, agriculture, and trade. The trade, hotel, and restaurant sectors have been the largest economic base in Pontianak City in recent years.

This can be seen from the percentage distribution of GDP, where the large and retail trade sector has the greatest role in total GDP compared to other sectors, which is 18.30 percent. In terms of usage, the value of GDP shows how products of goods and services are used for consumption, investment, or trading purposes with foreign/regional parties. Based on the percentage of GDP, aggregate demand in Pontianak City in 2015 as a whole experienced a growth of 4.84 percent compared to the previous year, whereas the household consumer component contributed as much as 10.61 trillion rupiah or by 51 percent.

=== Industry ===
The number of large and medium industrial enterprises in the city of Pontianak as of 2005 was 34 companies. Labor absorbed by industrial enterprises amounted to 3,300 people, consisting of 2,700 production workers and other workers and 600 administrators. Moderate or major industrial companies located in the District of North Pontianak have the largest labor force of around 2,952 people.

The resulting output value of large industrial enterprises or medium amounted to 1.51 trillion rupiah, where large industrial enterprises or are located in the District of North Pontianak dominated by rubber industry companies. The smallest output value derived from companies located in the District Pontianak City, worth 2.85 billion Rupiahs.

For Gross Value Added (NTB) obtained from all large and medium-sized industrial enterprises in Pontianak City during 2005, this amounted to 217.57 billion rupiah and indirect taxes obtained amounted to 462.78 million rupiah. The value added at factor fees earned amounted to 217.10 billion rupiah.

For small industrial centers, the industry results for agriculture and forestry (IHPK) shows that the snack food industry, centered in Sungai Kuhl, is the largest local small industry, employing as many as 329 people. Investment value reached 249.50 million and the sales amounted to 780.50 million. The water taro weaving industry has 16 business units with an investment of 17.5 million and sales of 110 million rupiah, mostly located in Tanjung Hulu, Pontianak East.

=== Agriculture ===
As of 2006, cassava, rice, and yams were the most prominent crops in Pontianak. Residents also farmed vegetables and aloe vera. Jackfruit, banana, and pineapple are also grown in the city. Farms in Pontianak raise cattle (beef and dairy), goats, pigs, and chickens.

In the surrounding areas of Pontianak, the herb Mitragyna speciosa, known colloquially as kratom, is grown, and Pontianak is a major center for exportation of the herb.

=== Trade ===
Trade is one of the rapidly growing businesses in the city of Pontianak. Modern trade began to develop in 2001 with the founding of Mal Sun Apartments in Dubai City. Modern shopping centers began to be built in various corners of the city, such as Ayani Mega Mall and Mall Pontianak. Various national retail companies are starting to do business in Pontianak.

== Education ==
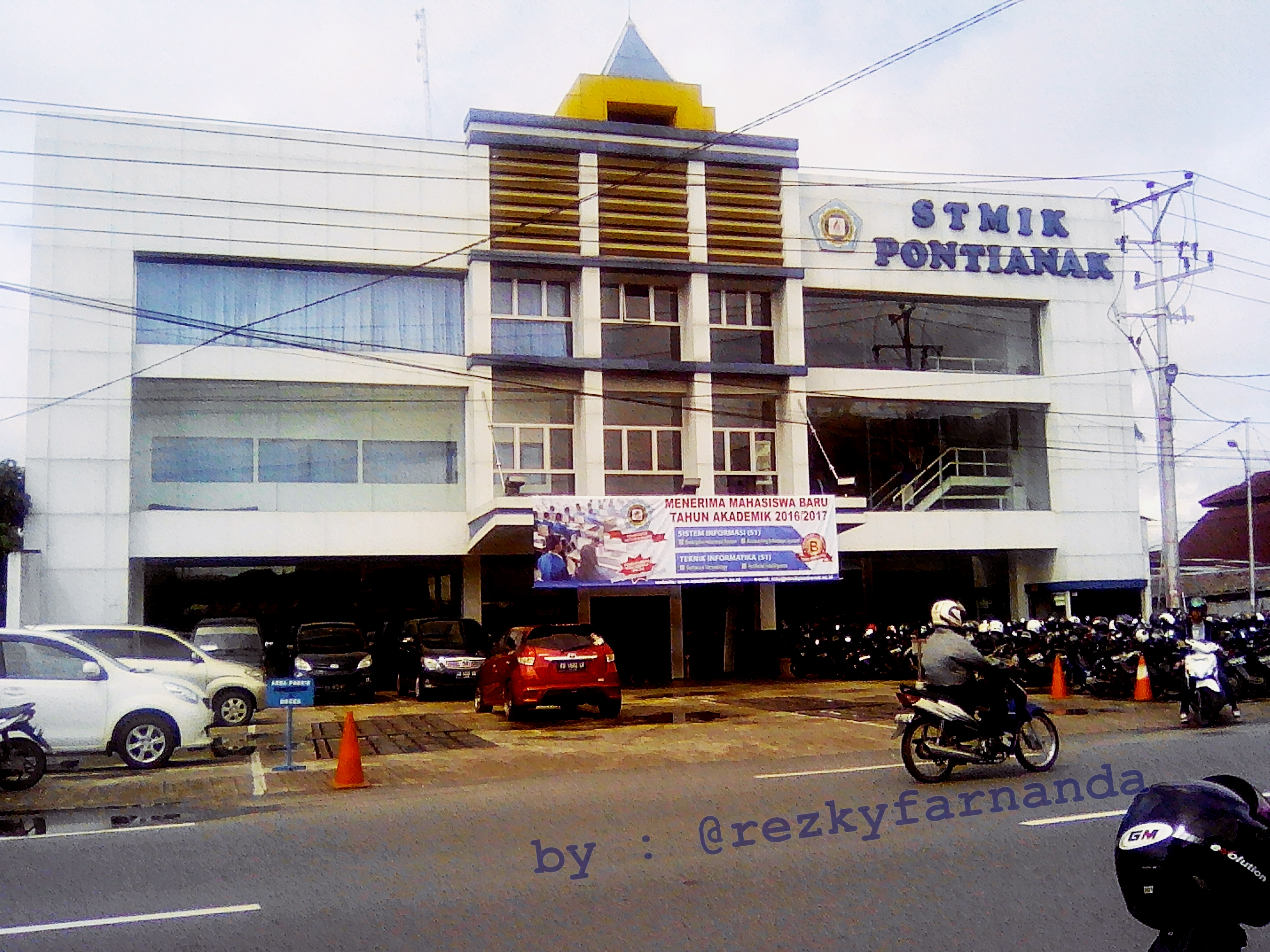
STMIK Pontianak

Based on data from the Pontianak City Education Office, in 2015 Pontianak has 111 kindergartens, 161 elementary schools, 76 junior high schools, 44 high schools, and 29 vocational high schools. The primary school education level (SD) has the highest student-teacher ratio at 22:1.

School Participation Rate (APS) in Pontianak for 7–12 years age group during the last three years has been around 100 percent. In the 13-15-year age group, school participation in this age group has fluctuated considerably in recent years. However, school participation of children aged 13–15 years continues to increase to close to 100 percent.

There are colleges and universities operated by both state authorities, as well as private and religious institutions. The University of Tanjung Pura, a state university, was established in Pontianak in 1963. Other universities are maintained by private institutions: Muhammadiyah University, University of Widya Dharma, Institut Teknologi dan Bisnis Sabda Setia, University of Panca Bhakti, STMIK, STAIN, POLNEP, and AKBID St Benedicta.

== Culture ==
The cultural diversity in Pontianak presents various events throughout the year. The Tionghua/Indonesian Chinese community celebrates Lunar New Year, Cap Go Meh (Lantern Festival, which falls on the fifteenth day of the first month of lunar calendar), and Cheng Meng (Tomb Sweeping Festival, on first day of the fifth solar term of the lunar calendar). The Malay celebrates Idul Fitri, Idul Adha, and Maulidur Rasul. The Dayak People celebrates the harvest season, locally known as Gawai Dayak. These events are usually marked with extravagant cultural parades around the city.

The equatorial line passing Pontianak is marked by a monument north of the city center. Between 19 and 21 March and 21–23 September (the equinoxes), solar culmination can be observed near the monument, where the setting of the sun will be exactly at 0° at noon (12:00), causing shadows at the monument and everything nearby to disappear for a few seconds, a phenomenon known in English as Lahaina noon.

=== Cuisine ===
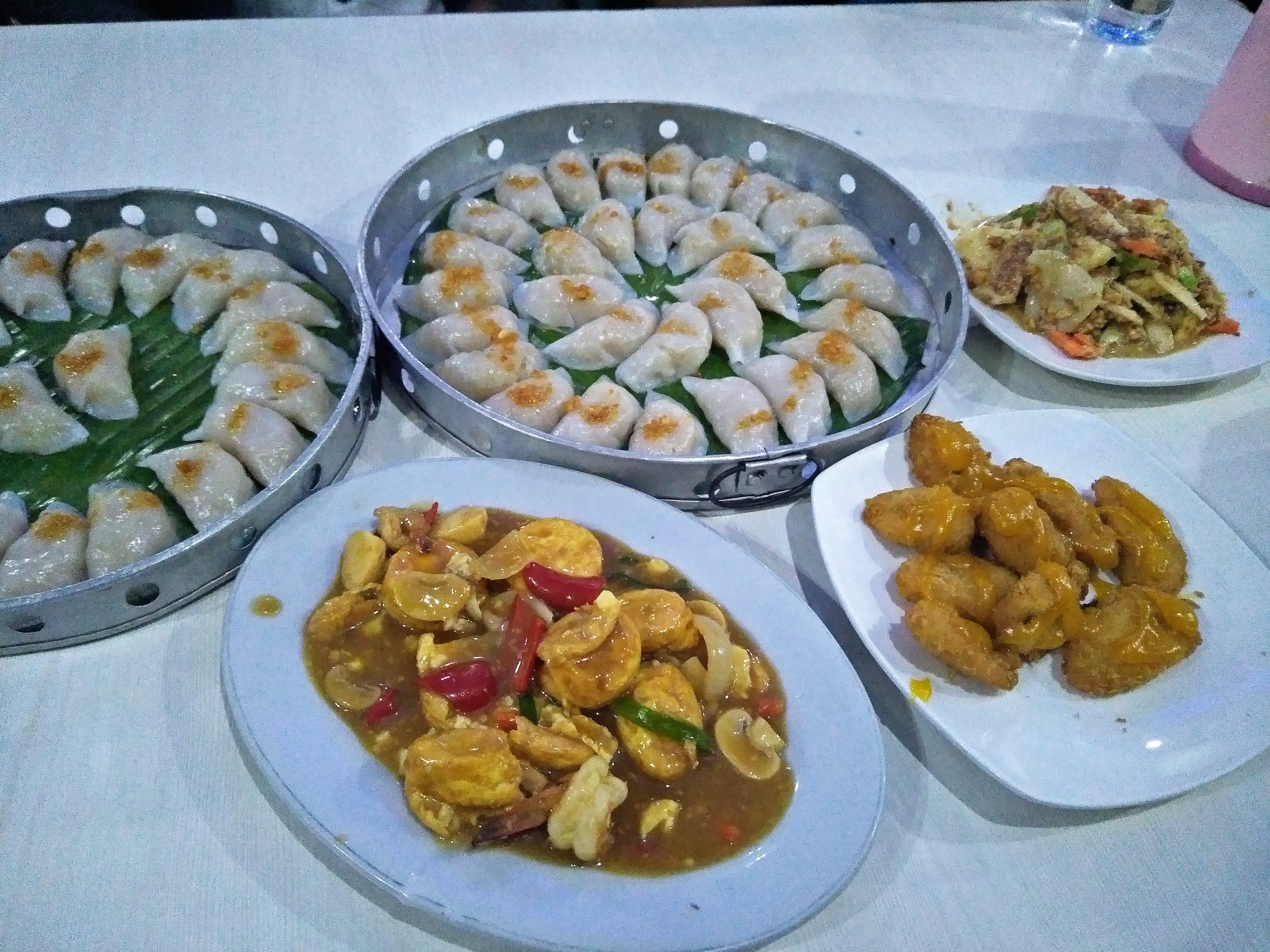
Various type of foods from Pontianak

Pontianak is also known for its culinary attractions, with its mix of Tionghua/Indonesian Chinese, Malay, local Dayak, and Javanese influences. Diversity makes Pontianak food a culinary paradise. The food is well known for the following:

- Nasi Cap Cai, rice mixed with a variety of other dishes to order.
- Otak Otak Ikan Tenggiri, mackerel fish cakes wrapped in banana leaves and grilled, is sometimes eaten with peanut sauce.
- Bakpao, bun with variety of fillings.
- Batang Burok
- Choi pan or chai kue, a Chinese dish made from a thin chai kue skin with the filling of the chai kue can be yam, taro, or chives.
- Lek Tau Suan (Chinese: 绿豆爽 (mung bean dessert with crispy rice crisp)
- Bubur pedas
- Yammie (stirred noodles with a variety of egg noodle, slim noodle, rice noodle "kwetiau"), mini-dumpling "Kiaw".
- Paceri Nanas
- Ikan asam pedas
- Pwe Ki Mue (bubur pesawat, rice porridge with many side dishes)
- Tart durian
- Nasi ayam "koi peng"
- Kaloci
- Mooncake or "gwek pia"
- Kwe Kia Theng
- Tencalok
- Lemang
- He Mue (rice and a choice from a variety of fish)
- Lempok Durian
- Nasi kari
- Roti kap
- Tempoyak
- Bingke
- Hekeng (prawn spring roll)
- Tar Susu
- Chai Kwee

== Transportation ==
Pontianak is well-connected by road, air, and sea. There are multiple city and intercity public transportation options.

=== Air ===
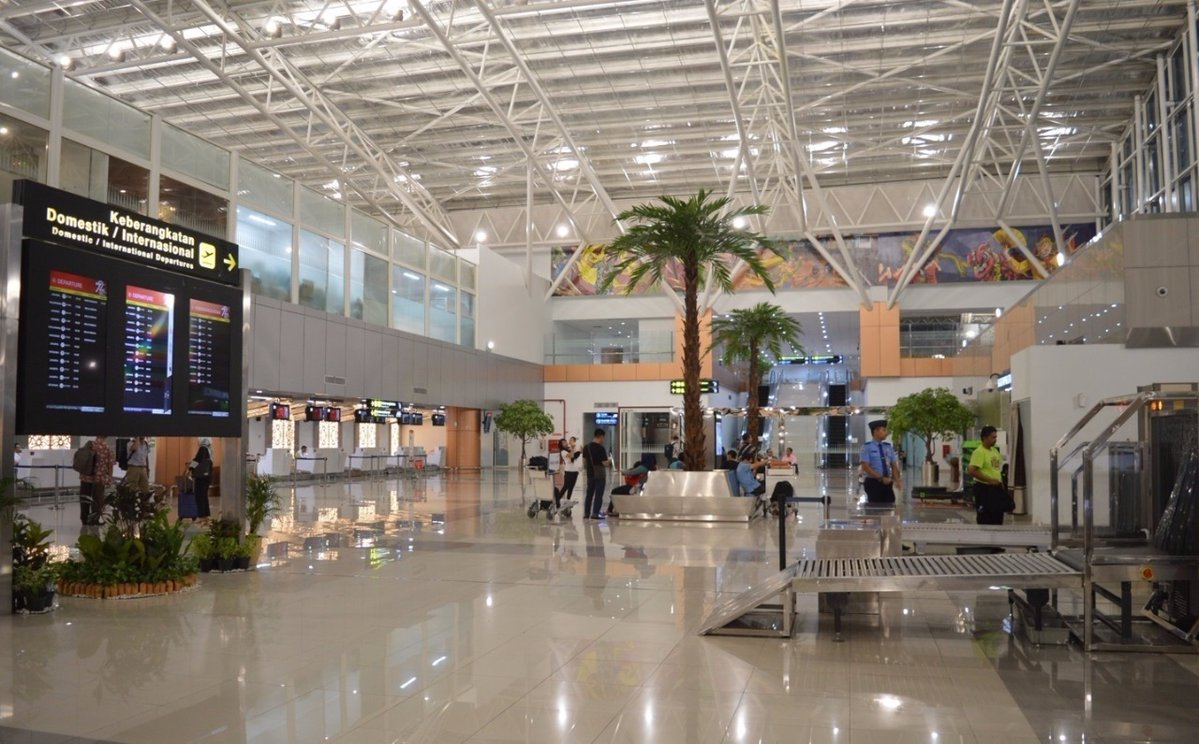
Inside of Supadio Airport terminal

Supadio International Airport is the main airport for Pontianak and West Kalimantan, built by the Japanese during World War II. The Indonesian government then developed the airport, resulting in its present form. The airport is not located within the city limits, but in Kubu Raya Regency which is 17 km away from the city center. Currently it is the second-largest airport in Kalimantan in terms of terminal size, after Sultan Aji Muhammad Sulaiman Airport in Balikpapan.

After construction of a new modern terminal to replace the old and overutilised terminal, the airport currently has a capacity of 3.8 million passengers annually, double the previous terminal's capacity. The airport serves direct domestic flights to other major cities in Indonesia, mostly in Java and Kalimantan. Moreover, the airport also has international flights to some cities in Malaysia, such as Kuala Lumpur and Kuching. The airport is expected to be expanded again in the future to cater to the increasing number of passengers travelling to and from Pontianak. Currently, the only ways to get to the airport are by taxi, private cars, or using DAMRI buses.

=== Sea ===
The Port of Pontianak, located on the banks of the Kapuas River, is the economic pulse of the city and connects an area of 146.8 thousand km2 in West Kalimantan Province. The size of this area is comparable to the island of Java plus the island of Madura combined. Main cities and towns served include Pontianak, Sintete, Sambas, Sintang, Sanggau, Kapuas, Hulu, Telok Air, Ketapang, and Singkawang.

There are two port areas under the auspices of PT. Pelindo II (Persero), namely the Port of Sintete and Ketapang Port.

This port's hinterland is dominated by plantations, the forestry sector, the mining sector, and raw materials processing industry. To cater for increased economic activity in this region, Pelindo II has operated the container terminal for Pontianak's port. It has been equipped with two container cranes and various modern equipment that can provide optimal support for loading and unloading activities in the region.

The Pontianak Crossing Port is the main passenger port. It allows ferry connection to other cities in Indonesia such as Jakarta, Surabaya, Medan, Batam, etc. The port currently does not serve international destinations such as Singapore and Malaysia.

=== Land ===
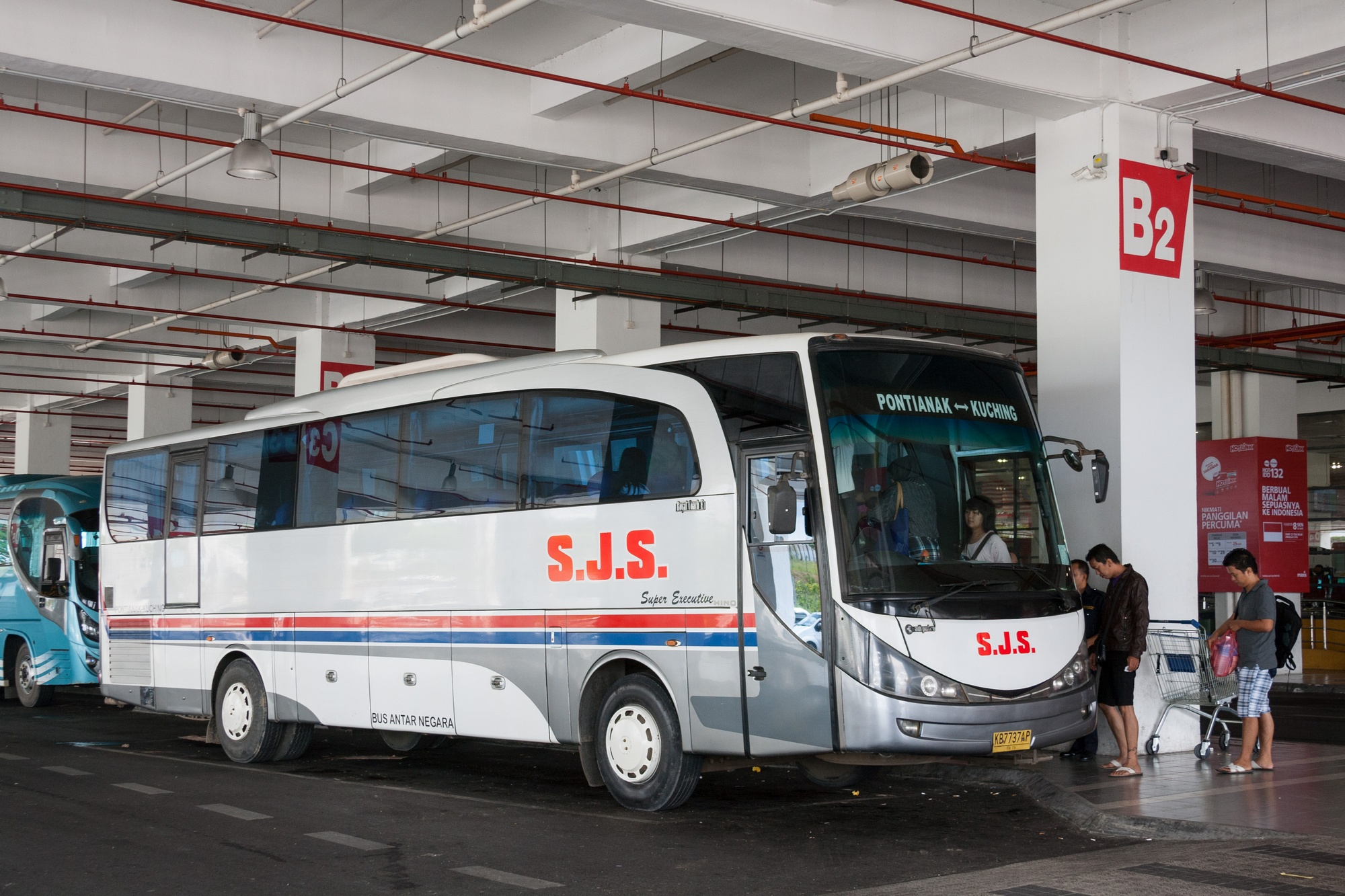
A front view of S.J.S Bus, connecting Pontianak to Kuching, Sarawak

Pontianak lies on the Trans Kalimantan Highway. The highway allows Pontianak to be connected to other major cities in Kalimantan such as Palangka Raya, Banjarmasin, and Samarinda. Moreover, it is possible to travel to East Malaysia and Brunei using the Trans-Kalimantan Highway. The distance from Pontianak to Kuching in Sarawak, Malaysia is about 340 km and takes about 6 hours 30 minutes. The distance from Pontianak to Bandar Seri Begawan in Brunei is about 1,100 km and takes about 18 hours. All people travelling to either Malaysia or Brunei must pass through the Entikong border checkpoint, the main Indonesian border checkpoint in Kalimantan.

Pontianak currently does not have a toll road. However, there is a proposal to build a highway connecting Pontianak with Singkawang, and to the Entikong border checkpoint near Malaysia.

== Sister cities ==
Pontianak has sister relationships with these cities:

- Kuching, Sarawak, Malaysia

== See also ==
- Lanfang Republic
- Roman Catholic Archdiocese of Pontianak
- Tadashige Daigo re: the massacre at Pontianak
