= Sejangkung =

District in West Kalimantan, Indonesia

- District
- Location within Kalimantan Location within Indonesia
- Coordinates: 01°25′35″N 109°19′21″E
- Country: Indonesia
- Province: West Kalimantan
- Regency: Sambas
- Established: 20 April 1963

Area
  - Total: 608.7 km^{2} (235.0 sq mi)
- Elevation: 17 m (56 ft)

Population (2010)
  - Total: 22,318
  - Density: 36.67/km^{2} (94.96/sq mi)
- Ministry of Home Affairs Code: 61.01.06

Sejangkung is a district in Sambas Regency, West Kalimantan, Indonesia. It is located on the western side of the island of Borneo, bordering Galing and Sajingan Besar to the north, Jagoi Babang and Seluas to the east, Subah and Sajad to the south, as well as Sambas and Teluk Keramat to the west. The district has an average elevation of 17 meters above the sea level. In the year 2010, the population of Sejangkung was 22,318.

== History ==
Sejangkung was established on 20 April 1963, after being split off from the eastern part of Sambas district. On 17 June 1996, two of its northeastern villages (Kaliau and Sebunga), became part of newly-established Sajingan Besar district.

== Administrative divisions ==
Sejangkung has the following 12 villages under its administration:

- Parit Raja
- Penakalan
- Perigi Landu
- Perigi Limus
- Piantus
- Sekuduk
- Semanga
- Sendoyan
- Senujuh
- Sepantai
- Setalik
- Sulung

== Education ==
There are 33 schools within Sejangkung.

Type	Number	
Type	Public	Private
Primary schools (SD)	24	0
Junior High Schools (SMP)	4	0
Madrasah Ibtidaiyah (MI)	1	1
Madrasah Tsanawiyah (MTs)	0	3
