= 2024 Sambas regency election =

2024 Sambas regental election
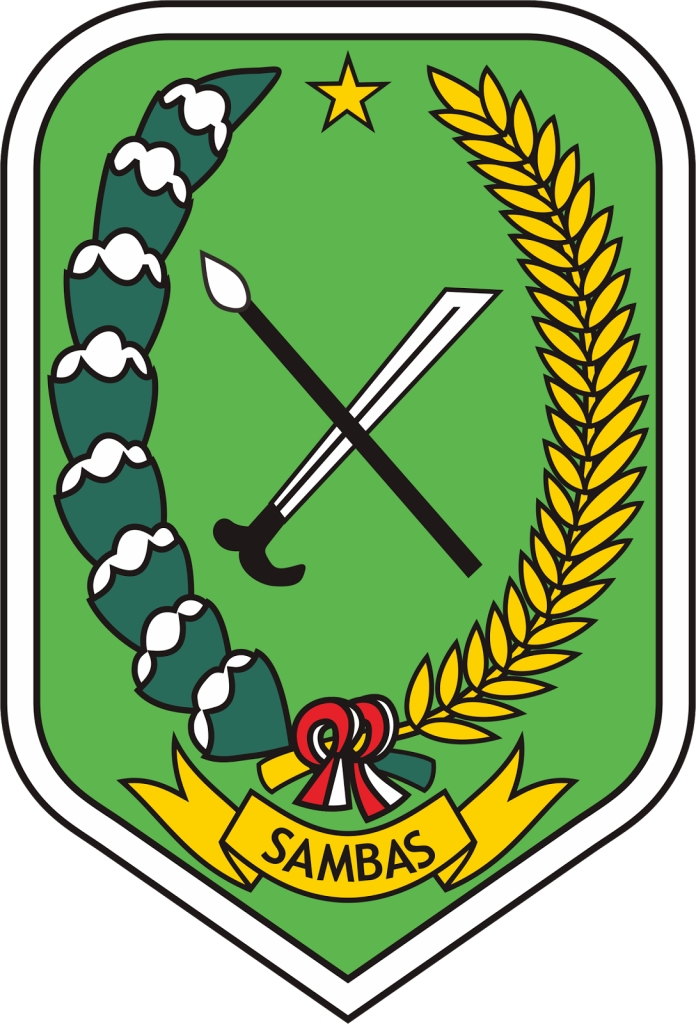
- 27 November 2024
- Registered: 458,025
- Turnout: 296,522 (64.74%)
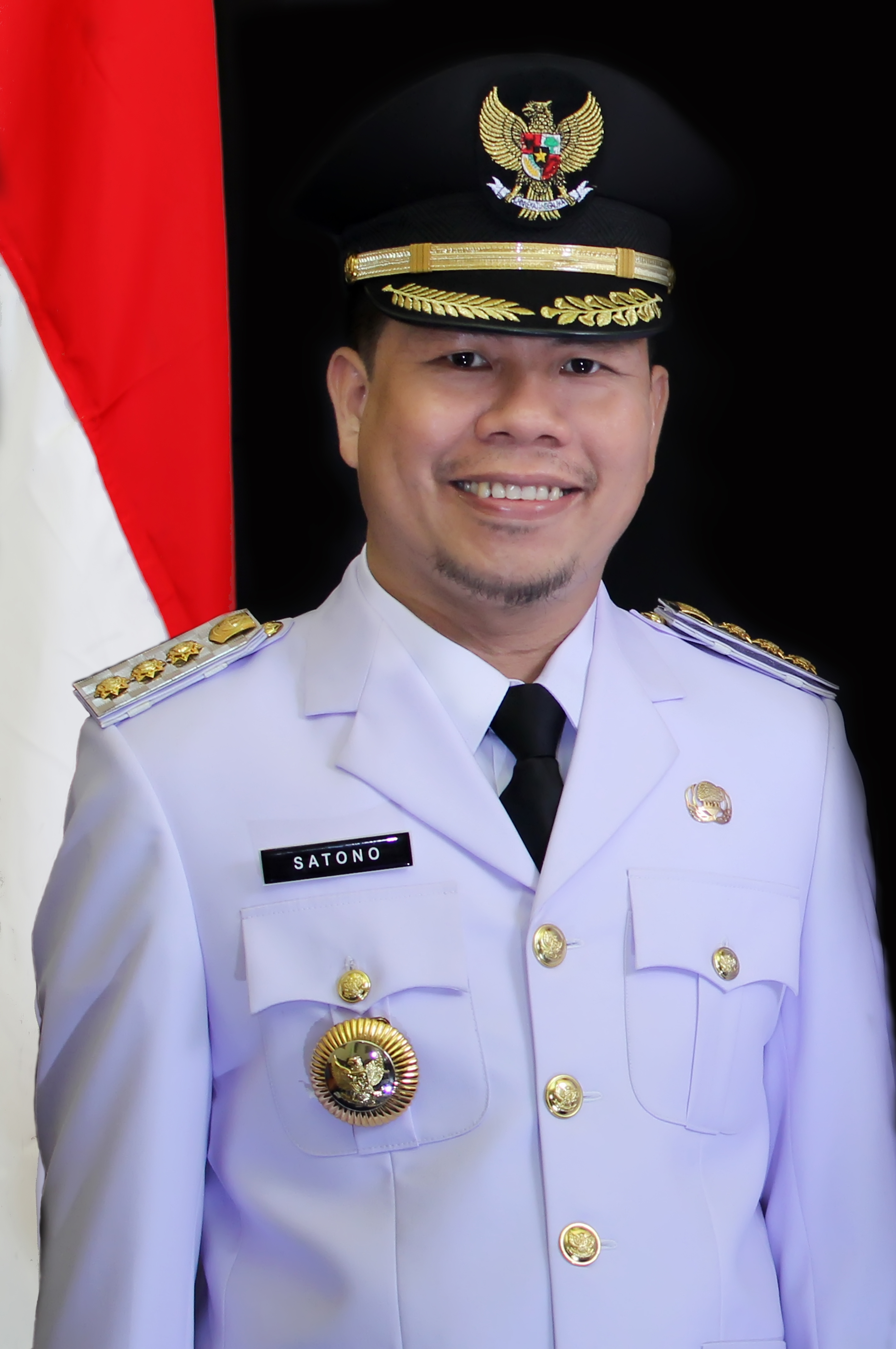

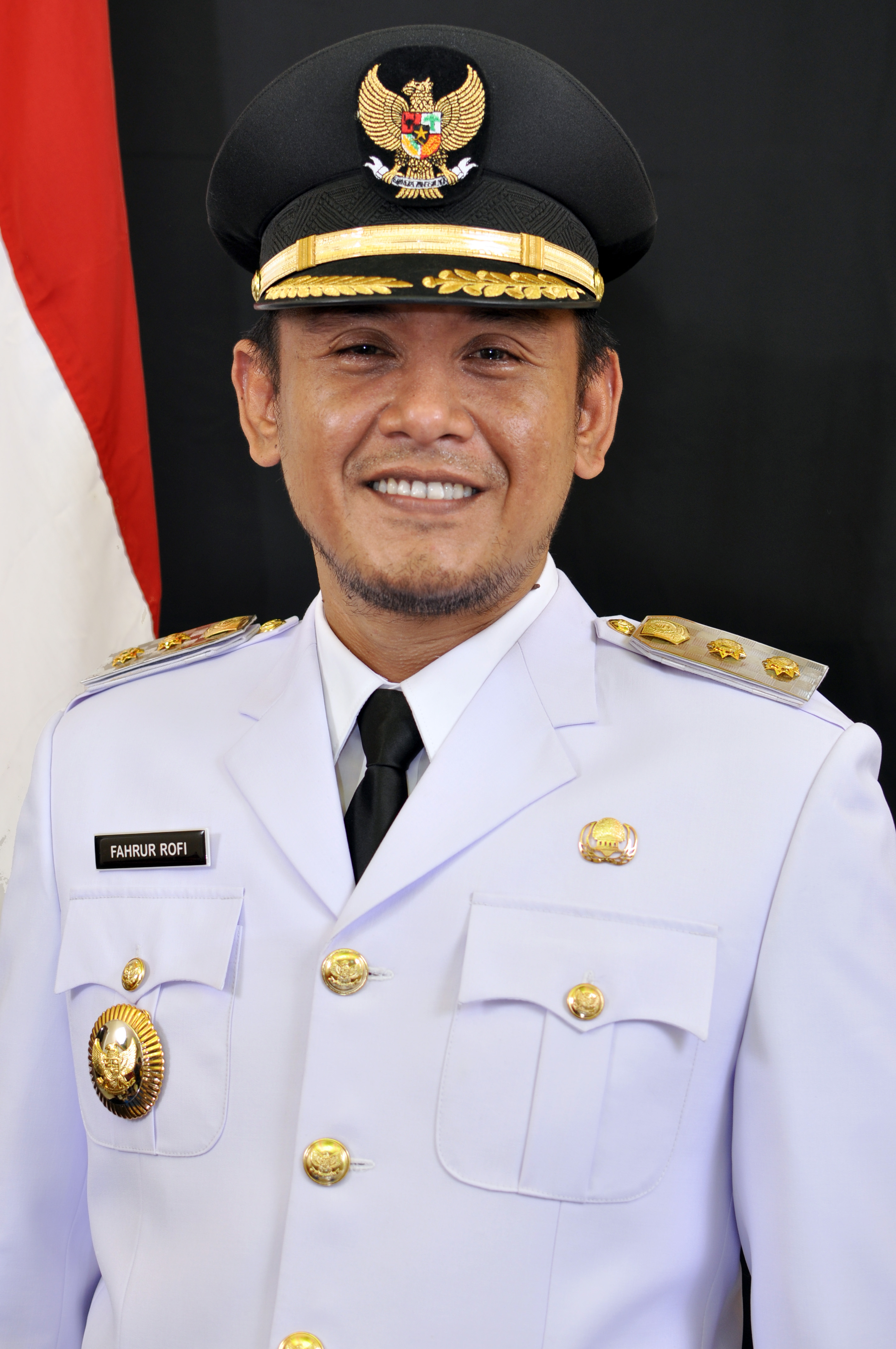
Candidate	Satono	Fahrur Rofi	Misni Safari
Party	Gerindra	PAN	Independent
Running mate	Heroaldi Djuhardi Alwi	Sabib	Mariadi
Popular vote	142,909	125,863	20,470
Percentage	49.41%	43.51%	7.08%
Regent before election
Satono
Gerindra
Elected Regent
Satono
Gerindra

The 2024 Sambas regental election was held on 27 November 2024 as part of nationwide local elections to elect the regent of Sambas Regency in West Kalimantan for a five-year term. The previous election was held in 2020. Incumbent regent Satono won against incumbent vice regent Fahrur Rofi and independent candidate Misni Safari.

== Electoral system ==
The election, like other local elections in 2024, follow the first-past-the-post system where the candidate with the most votes wins the election, even if they do not win a majority. It is possible for a candidate to run uncontested, in which case the candidate is still required to win a majority of votes "against" an "empty box" option. Should the candidate fail to do so, the election will be repeated on a later date.

== Candidates ==
=== Rofi - Sabib ===
1
Candidate from PAN and PKS
Fahrur Rofi	Sabib
for Regent	for Vice Regent
Vice Regent of Sambas (2021–2025)	Head of Sambas Regency Public Works Department (2018–2023)
Parties
NasDem; PKS; Gelora

=== Satono - Heroaldi ===
2
Candidate from Gerindra and Perindo
Satono	Heroaldi Djuhardi Alwi
for Regent	for Vice Regent
tepi	tepi
Regent of Sambas (since 2021)	Head of Settlements Preparation and Development Division at the Sambas Regency Department of Manpower and Transmigration (2017–2020)
Parties
Gerindra; Golkar; PDI-P; PKB; PAN; Demokrat; PPP

=== Misni - Mariadi ===
3
Candidate from Independent
Misni Safari	Mariadi
for Regent	for Vice Regent
Deputy Speaker of Sambas Regency Regional People's Representative Council (2014–2019)	Bengkayang Regency Malay Ethnic Community Functionary Chairman

== Results ==
=== Official results ===
Candidate	Running mate	Party	Votes	%
Satono	Heroaldi Djuhardi Alwi	Gerindra	142,909	49.41
Fahrur Rofi	Sabib	PAN	125,863	43.51
Misni Safari	Mariadi	Independent	20,470	7.08
Total			289,242	100.00
Valid votes			289,242	97.54
Invalid/blank votes			7,280	2.46
Total votes			296,522	100.00
Registered voters/turnout			458,025	64.74
Source: Sambas Regency General Elections Commission
