= Sambas =

Sambas may refer to:

- Sambas Regency, a regency in West Kalimantan
- Sambas (town), a town in West Kalimantan
- Sultanate of Sambas, a Malay sultanate in West Kalimantan
- Plural of samba, a Brazilian music and dance style
