= Archaeology of Indonesia =

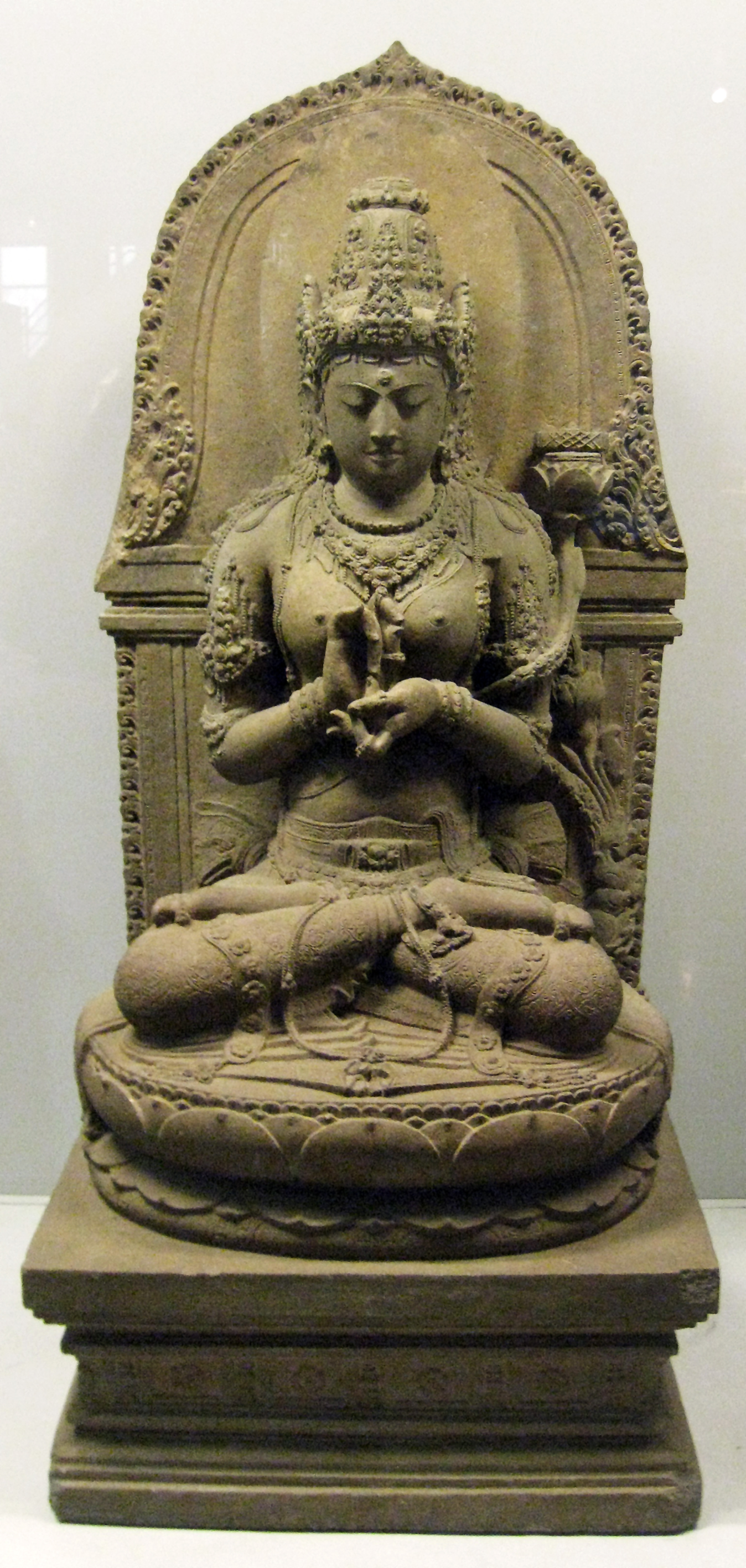
Prajnaparamita of Java has become perhaps the best known icon of ancient Indonesian art, as one of the rare images that successfully combines aesthetic perfection and spirituality.

The archaeology of Indonesia is the study of the archaeology of the archipelagic realm that today forms the nation of Indonesia, stretching from prehistory through almost two millennia of documented history. The ancient Indonesian archipelago was a geographical maritime bridge between the political and cultural centers of Ancient India and Imperial China, and is notable as a part of ancient Maritime Silk Road.

The first government institution of archaeology was officially formed in 1913 with the establishment of Oudheidkundige Dienst in Nederlandsch-Indië (Archaeological Service in the Dutch East Indies) under Professor Dr. N.J. Kromm.

Today, the national institution of archaeology in Indonesia is the Pusat Penelitian Arkeologi Nasional (National Archaeology Research Institute).

== History ==
=== Early period ===
During the early period of archaeological discovery in Indonesia, from the 16th to the 18th century, ancient statues, temples, ruins and other archaeological sites and artifacts were usually left intact, undisturbed by locals. This was mainly due to local taboo and superstitious beliefs connecting statues and ancient ruins with spirits that might cause misfortune. For example, two old Javanese chronicles (babad) from the 18th century mention cases of bad luck associated with "the mountain of statues", which was actually the ruins of the Borobudur Buddhist monument. According to the Babad Tanah Jawi, the monument was a fatal factor for Mas Dana, a rebel who revolted against Pakubuwono I, the king of Mataram in 1709. It was recorded that the "Redi Borobudur" hill was besieged and the insurgents were defeated and sentenced to death by the king. In the Babad Mataram (or the History of the Mataram Kingdom), the monument was associated with the misfortune of Prince Monconagoro, the crown prince of the Yogyakarta Sultanate in 1757. In spite of a taboo against visiting the monument, "he took what is written as the knight who was captured in a cage (a Buddha statue in one of the perforated stupas)". Upon returning to his palace, he fell ill and died a day later.

Another example: the Prambanan and Sewu temple compound is connected to the Javanese legend of Roro Jonggrang; a wondrous folklore about a multitude of demons that built almost a thousand temples, and a prince who cursed a beautiful but cunning princess causing her to become a stone statue. Nevertheless, several Javanese Keratons did collect archaeological artifacts, including Hindu-Buddhist statues. For example, Keraton Surakarta, Keraton Yogyakarta, and Mangkunegaran collected archaeological artifacts in their palace museums. In areas where the Hindu faith survived, especially Bali, archaeological sites such as Goa Gajah cave sanctuary and the Gunung Kawi temples still served their original religious purposes as sacred places of worship.

=== Dutch East Indies period ===
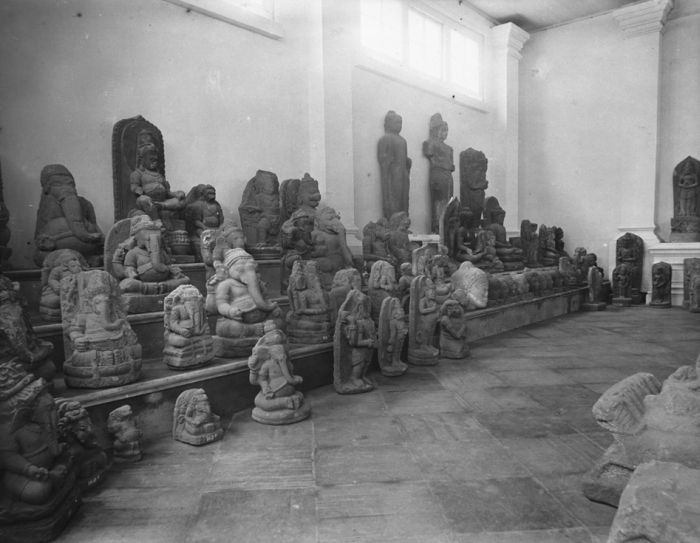
Hindu-Buddhist sculptures in the Museum of the Royal Batavian Society of Arts and Sciences (today the National Museum of Indonesia), Batavia, c.1896

Formal archaeological study in Indonesia has its roots in 18th-century Batavia, when a group of Dutch intellectuals established a scientific institution under the name Bataviaasch Genootschap van Kunsten en Wetenschappen, (Royal Batavian Society of Arts and Sciences) on 24 April 1778. This private body had the aim of promoting research in the field of arts and sciences, especially in history, archaeology, ethnography and physics, and publishing the various findings.

Sir Thomas Stamford Raffles, the Governor General of British Java (1811 to 1816) had a personal interest in the history, culture, and the antiquity of ancient Java, writing The History of Java, which was published in 1817. During his administration, the ancient ruins of Borobudur, Prambanan and Trowulan came to light. This sparked a wider interest in Javanese archaeology. A number of temple ruins were surveyed, recorded and catalogued systematically for the first time. However, by the 19th century, the sudden surge of interest in Javanese art had led to the looting of archaeological sites by "souvenir hunters" and thieves. This period saw the decapitation of a Buddha's head at Borobudur. Of the original 504 ancient Buddha statues in Borobudur, over 300 are damaged (mostly headless), and 43 are missing. The looted Borobudur Buddhas' heads were mostly sold abroad, ending up in private collections or acquired by Western museums such as the Tropenmuseum in Amsterdam and The British Museum in London.

In 1901, the colonial government of the Dutch East Indies set up the Commissie in Nederlandsch Indie voor Oudheidkundige Onderzoek van Java en Madoera, headed by Dr J. L. A. Brandes. It was officially recognized on 14 June 1913, with the formation of the Oudheidkundige Dienst in Nederlandsch-Indië (Archaeological Service of the Dutch East Indies), often abbreviated as "OD", under Professor Dr. N.J. Kromm. Kromm is credited as the pioneer who established the organizational foundation of archaeological study in the East Indies. The object of this was to attempt to ensure that every archaeological find, discovery, exploration and study was conducted and recorded correctly and in accord with the scientific approach of modern archaeology. During Kromm's administration, numbers of journals, books and catalogues were composed and published which systematically recorded the archaeological finds in the colony. Several initial restoration works on the temple ruins of Java were also conducted during this period.

=== Republic of Indonesia period ===
After the turbulent period of World War II Pacific War (1941–45) and the ensuing Indonesian Revolution (1945–49) the Oudheidkundige Dienst ("OD") was nationalized by the newly recognized United States of Indonesia in 1950 as Djawatan Poerbakala Repoeblik Indonesia Serikat (Archaeological Service of the United States of Indonesia). In 1951, the organization of Djawatan Purbakala was improved as Dinas Purbakala as a part of Djawatan Kebudajaan Departemen Pendidikan dan Kebudajaan (Cultural Service of Department of Education and Culture), with independent archaeological offices in Makassar, Prambanan and Bali.

In 1953, two of the first native Indonesian archaeologists graduated, one of them was R. Soekmono, who subsequently succeeded Bernet Kemper as the chief of Djawatan Poerbakala Repoeblik Indonesia. Later, the national archaeological institution changed to Lembaga Poerbakala dan Peninggalan Nasional (Institute of Archaeology and National Heritage) or LPPN.

In 1975 the LPPN was separated into two institutions: Direktorat Pemeliharaan dan Pelestarian Peninggalan Sejarah dan Purbakala which focussed on preservation efforts; and Pusat Penelitian Purbakala dan Peninggalan Nasional which focussed on archaeological research.

In 1980, the institution was changed to Pusat Penelitian Arkeologi Nasional (National Archaeological Research Center) under the Ministry of Education and Culture. In 2000 the institution was transferred to Ministry of Culture and Tourism. In 2005 the institution name was changed to Pusat Penelitian dan Pengembangan Arkeologi Nasional (National Archaeological Research and Development Center). In 2012 it changed again to Pusat Arkeologi Nasional (National Archaeological Center) with authority transferred back from the Ministry of Tourism to the Ministry of Education and Culture.

Today, several Indonesian public universities have archaeology study programmes, including Gadjah Mada University in Yogyakarta, University of Indonesia in Jakarta, Udayana University in Bali, Hasanuddin University in Makassar, Haluoleo University in Kendari and Jambi University in Jambi.

In January 2021, archaeologists announced the discovery of at least 45,500 years old cave art in Leang Tedongnge cave. According to the journal Science Advances, cave painting of a warty pig is the earliest evidence of human settlement of the region. An adult male pig, measuring 136 cm x 54 cm, was depicted with horn-like facial warts and two handprints above its hindquarters. According to co-author Adam Brumm, two other pigs that were partly preserved suggest that the wart pig was observing a fight between two of them.

== Notable sites ==
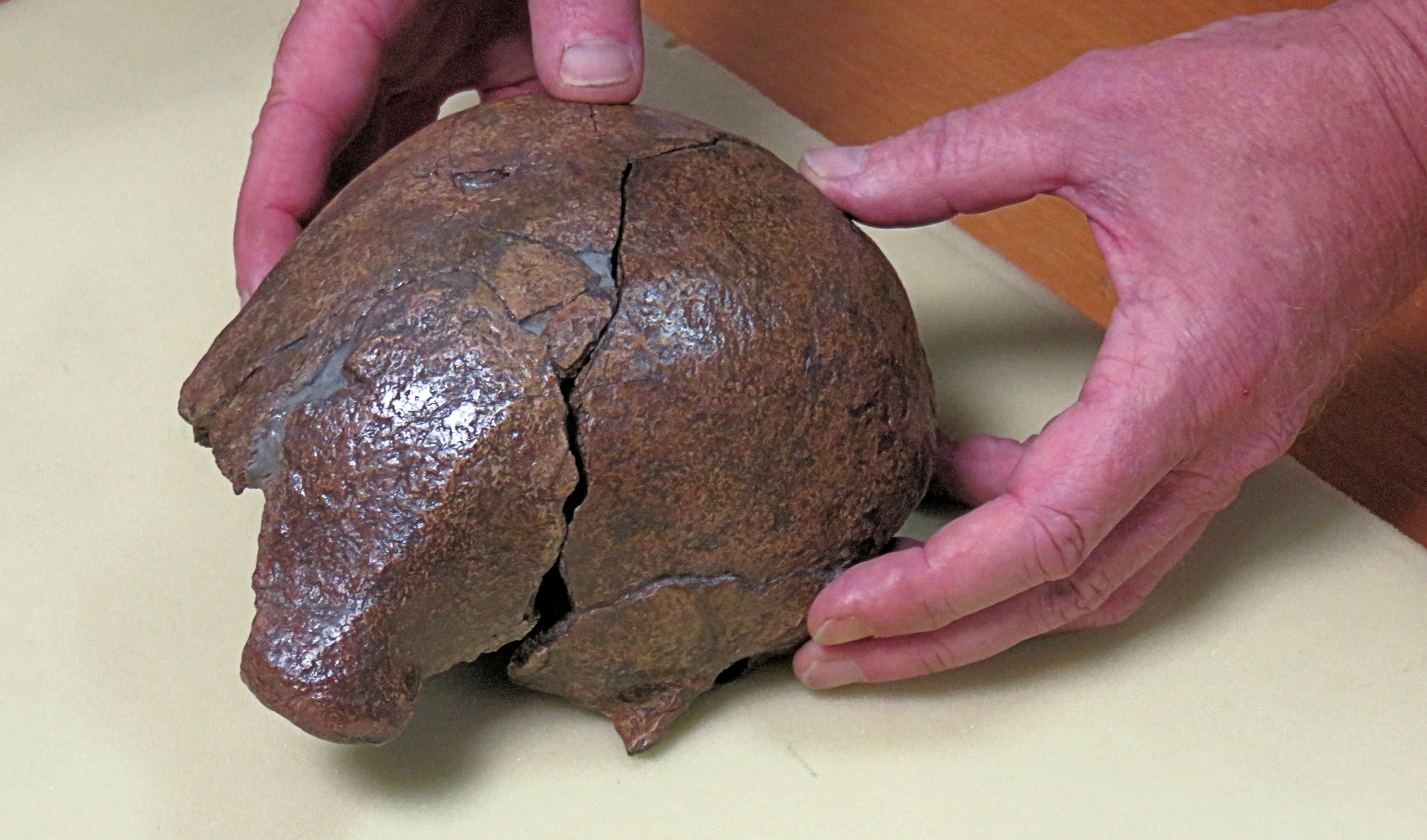
The cranial skull of Homo erectus discovered at Sangiran

- Sangiran: one of the most important sites in the world for studying hominid fossils, including Homo erectus.
- Trinil: the site of the discovery of Java Man, an early human fossil.
- Liang Bua: the limestone cave on the island of Flores where the fossil of Homo floresiensis, nicknamed the Hobbit, was discovered in 2003.
- Gunung Padang: a megalithic site located in Karyamukti village, Cianjur Regency, West Java Province of Indonesia, 30 km southwest of the city of Cianjur or 6 kilometers from Lampegan station.
- Buni: a prehistoric clay pottery culture that flourished in coastal northern West Java and Banten around 400 BC to 100 AD and probably survived until 500 AD. The culture was named after its first discovered archaeological site, Buni village in Babelan, Bekasi, east of Jakarta.

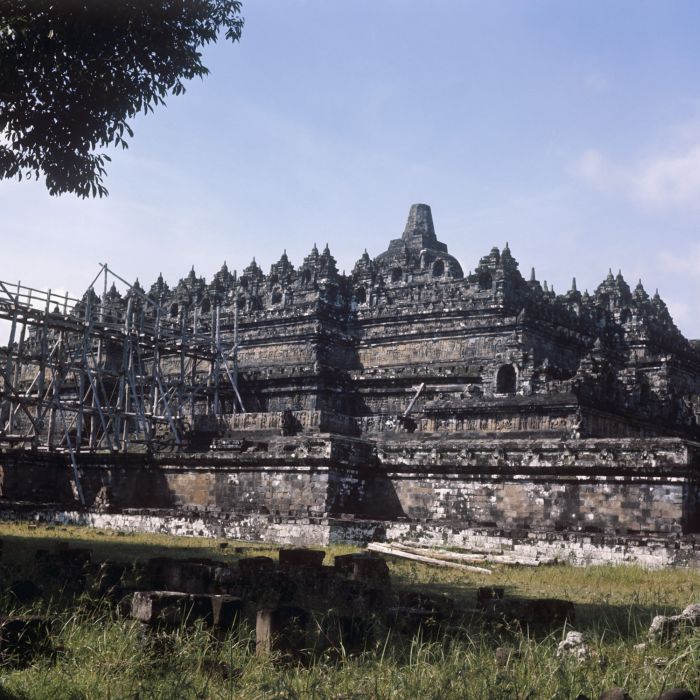
Borobudur restoration circa 1980

- Borobudur Temple Compounds: the archaeological area of three Buddhist temples in the fertile Kedu Plain of Central Java, comprises Borobudur, Mendut, and Pawon. These three temples are located in a straight line, and are considered to have been built during the Shailendra dynasty circa 8th–9th centuries.
- Prambanan Temple Compounds: the archaeological area of several Hindu-Buddhist temples in Prambanan Plain, including its main site the Prambanan Trimurti Hindu temple, and nearby Sewu, Lumbung and Bubrah temples. The Sewu Buddhist temple compound dates from the 8th century, while the main Hindu temple compound of Prambanan dates from the 9th century. Other nearby but separated sites including Plaosan, Sojiwan, Ratu Boko, Banyunibo and Ijo temple.
- Muara Takus: the 11th to 12th century red brick Buddhist temple complex linked to the Srivijaya empire, located in Kampar Regency, Riau province.
- Muaro Jambi Temple Compounds: an extensive site of Buddhist temples of red brick structure estimated to date from the 11th to 13th century CE, and linked to Srivijaya and Melayu Kingdom. The archaeological site includes eight excavated temple sanctuaries and covers about 12 square kilometers, stretching 7.5 kilometers along the Batang Hari River. 80 menapos, or mounds of temple ruins, are not yet restored.
- Sriwijaya Kingdom Archaeological Park: the remnants of ancient man-made canals, moats, ponds and artificial islands discovered near the northern bank of Musi river in the vicinity of Palembang. It is suggested that the site is a 9th-century settlement related to the Srivijaya empire.
- Padang Lawas archaeological site: the remains of an 11th to 13th century Buddhist temple complex, located in Padang Lawas Regency and North Padang Lawas Regency in North Sumatra. The most well-preserved temple are the Bahal temple complex, however most of other temples are in ruins.

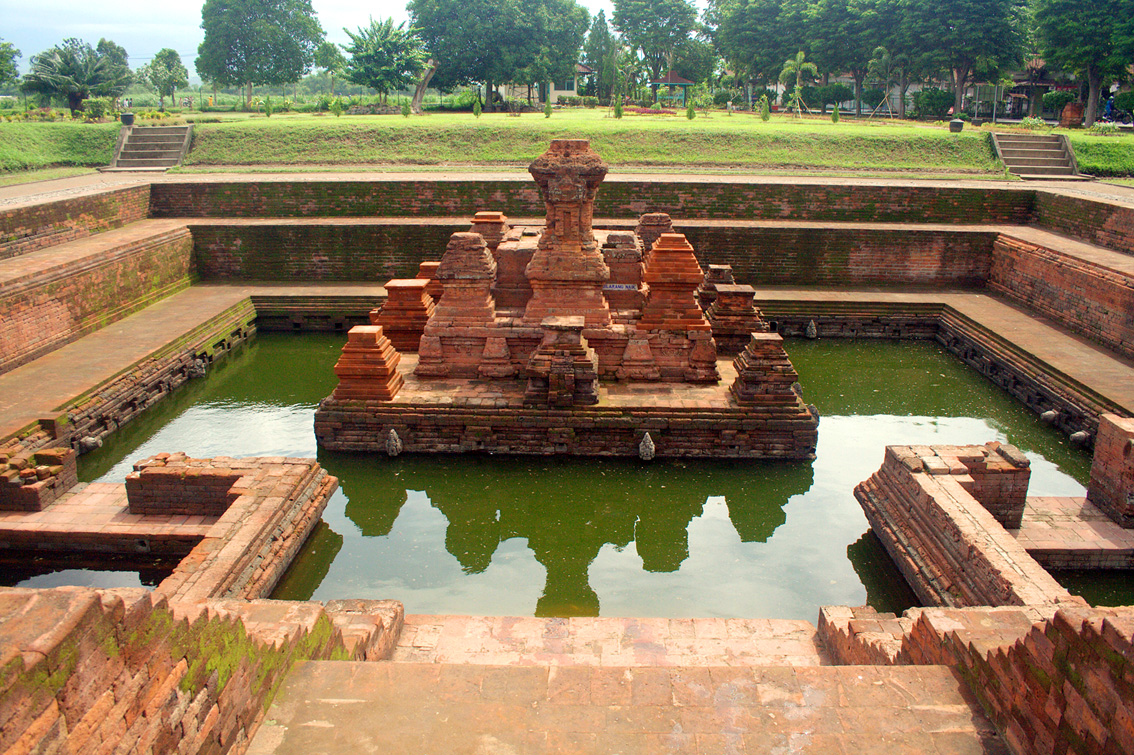
Candi Tikus, a 14th-century bathing pool of Trowulan, discovered in 1914

- Archaeological sites of former Singhasari kingdom around Malang area in East Java: the remnant of 13th century Kutaraja, the royal capital of Singhasari centered in present-day Singosari district in Malang Regency. The sites including Jago and Kidal temple, Sumberawan stupa, Giant Dvarapala and Singhasari temple.
- Trowulan: a 100 square kilometres archaeological site in Trowulan Subdistrict, Mojokerto Regency, that was the royal capital of the 13th to 15th century Majapahit empire.
- Archaeological sites of Central Bali, including Goa Gajah and Gunung Kawi: the remnants of sacred sanctuary and funerary temples dated to the 9th to 11th century Hindu Bali Kingdom. Goa Gajah contains a cave sanctuary and ritual bathing pools, probably served as a Hindu hermitage. The cave was rediscovered by Dutch archaeologists in 1923, but the fountains and pool were not uncovered until 1954. While Gunung Kawi is an 11th-century temple and funerary complex in Tampaksiring north east of Ubud in Bali
- Gunongan Historical Park: a 17th-century palace and garden located in Aceh, with a white circular structure known as the Gunongan, after which the park has been named. Possibly built by Iskandar Muda of Aceh.
- Fort Nassau, Banda Islands: the first Dutch fort built on Banda (or Bandaneira) Island, the main island of the Banda Islands, part of Maluku in Indonesia, completed in 1609. Its purpose was to control the trade in nutmeg, which at that time was only grown in the Banda Islands.
- Old Batavia: the old town of Jakarta contains Dutch-style structures mostly dating from the 17th century, when the port city was served as the Asian headquarters of the VOC during the heyday of the spice trade. It covers 1.3 square kilometres within North Jakarta and West Jakarta.
- Tambora culture: a lost village and culture on Sumbawa Island buried by ash and pyroclastic flows from the massive 1815 eruption of Mount Tambora. People and houses are preserved as they were in 1815. Sigurdsson dubbed it the Pompeii of the East.

== Notable findings and artifacts ==
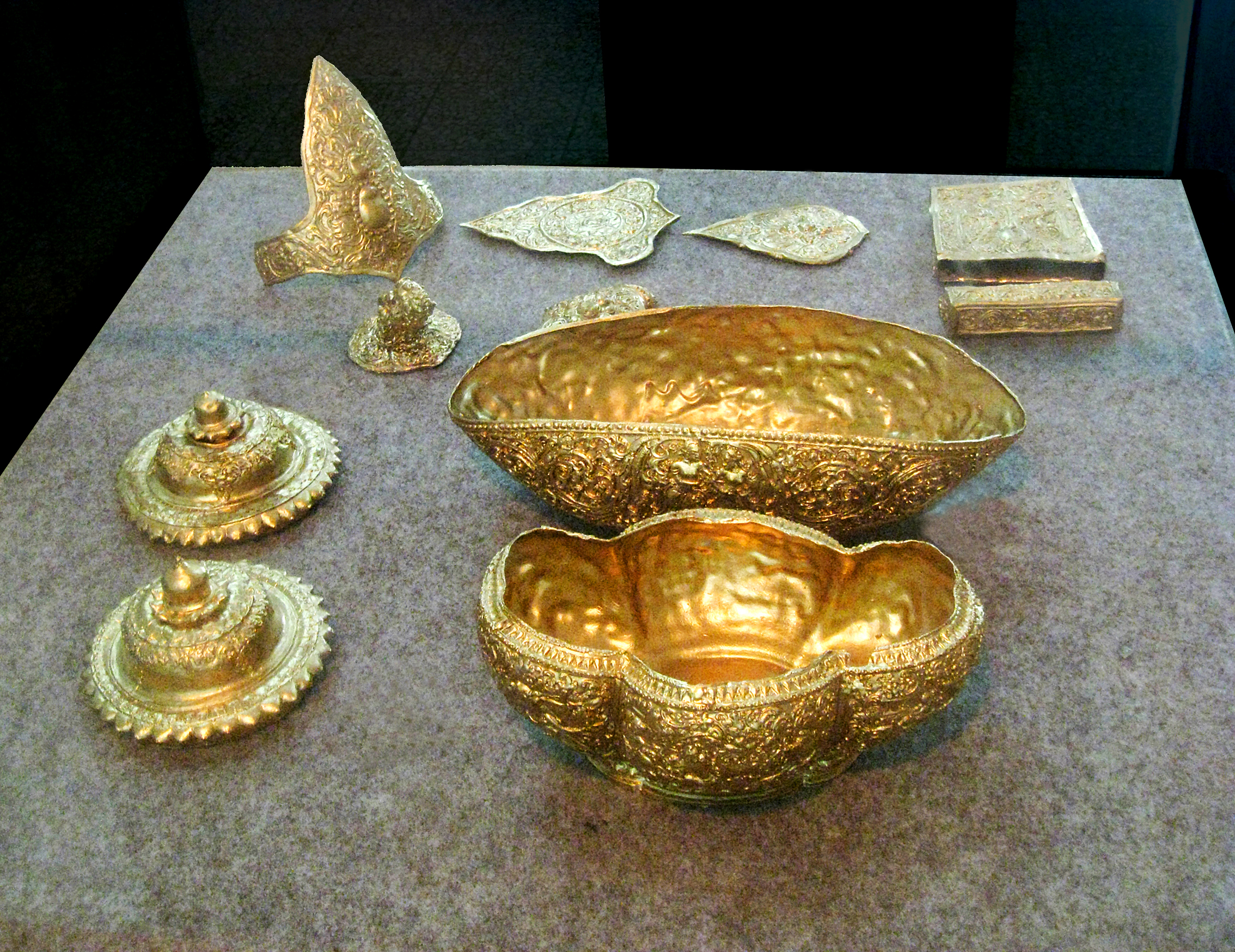
The 9th century Central Javanese Wonoboyo Hoard, discovered in 1990

- Wonoboyo Hoard: golden and silver artifacts from the 9th century Mataram kingdom in Central Java. It was discovered in October 1990 in Plosokuning hamlet, Wonoboyo village, Klaten, Central Java, near Prambanan.
- Sambas Treasure: a hoard of ancient gold and silver Buddhist sculptures found near the town of Sambas in West Kalimantan that now form part of the British Museum's collection. Dating from 8th–9th centuries AD they were probably made in Java.
- Belitung shipwreck: the wreck of an Arabian dhow which sailed en route from Africa to China around 830 CE. The ship completed the outward journey, but sank on the return journey, approximately 1 mile (1.6 km) off the coast of Belitung Island, Indonesia. The cargo contains Chinese Tang gold and ceramics artifacts.
- Cirebon shipwreck: a 10th-century shipwreck discovered in 2003 offshore of Cirebon. It contains a large amount of Chinese Yue ware and important evidence of the Maritime Silk Road.
- Prajnaparamita of Java: a masterpiece of Javanese classical Hindu-Buddhist art; it is a depiction of Prajñāpāramitā from the 13th century Singhasari kingdom of East Java. A prized item in the collection of the National Museum of Indonesia.
- Kris of Knaud: the oldest known kris surviving in the world, dated to the Majapahit period (c. 14th century). Today it is displayed in the Tropenmuseum, the Royal Tropical Institute in Amsterdam.

== Institutions ==
- National Archaeology Research Institute (Indonesia)
- Balai Arkeologi
- National Archives of Indonesia
- Indonesian Institute of Sciences

== See also ==
- List of museums and cultural institutions in Indonesia
- Candi of Indonesia
- History of Indonesia
