= Salatiga District =

Salatiga
- District
- Interactive map of Salatiga
- Country: Indonesia
- Province: West Kalimantan
- Regency: Sambas

Area
  - Total: 66.82 km^{2} (25.80 sq mi)

Population (mid 2024 estimate)
  - Total: 18,912
  - Density: 283.0/km^{2} (733.0/sq mi)

Salatiga is one of the nineteen administrative districts ([kecamatan) in Sambas Regency in West Kalimantan. It was formed through a Regional Regulation in 2007, and was previously the southern portion of Pemangkat District.
