= Jacobus Luna =

Indonesian politician (1941–2022)

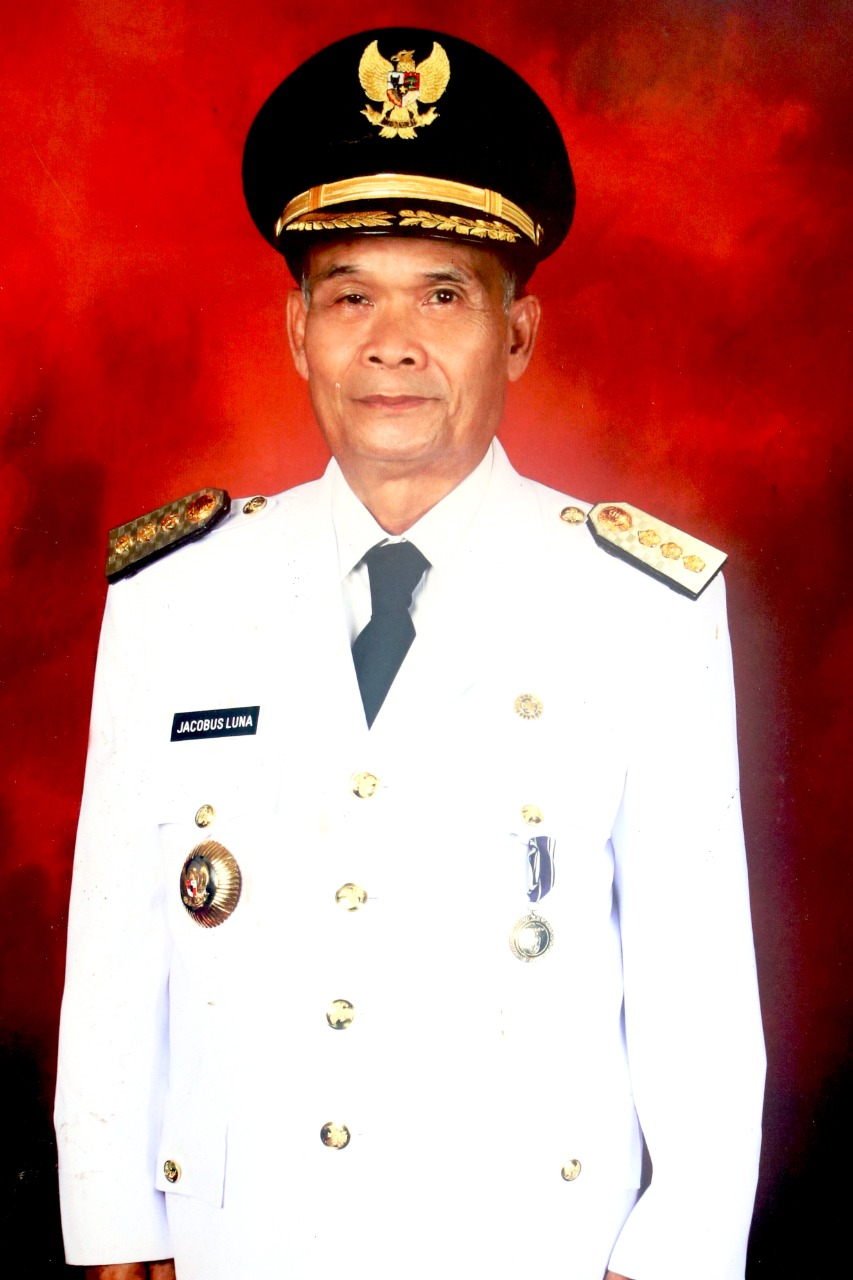

Regent of Bengkayang
- In office 4 May 2000 – 10 August 2010
- Preceded by: position established
- Succeeded by: Suryadman Gidot

Personal details
- Born: 12 December 1941 Sambas Regency, Dutch East Indies
- Died: 11 March 2022 (aged 80) Bengkayang Regency, Indonesia
- Party: Golkar (1982–1985); PDI-P (2004–2010)
- Education: Tanjungpura University

Jacobus Luna (12 December 1941 – 11 March 2022) was an Indonesian politician. A member of the Indonesian Democratic Party of Struggle, he served as regent of Bengkayang from 2000 to 2010. He died on 11 March 2022, at the age of 80.
