= Cirebon shipwreck =

9th or 10th-century shipwreck

The Cirebon shipwreck is a late 9th to 10th-century shipwreck discovered in 2003, in the Java Sea offshore of Cirebon, West Java, Indonesia. The shipwreck contains a large amount of Chinese Yue ware, and is notable as important marine archaeology evidence of the Maritime Silk Road trading activity in Maritime Southeast Asia.

== Discovery, location and findings ==
Local fishermen in the Java Sea acquired fragments of Chinese ceramics in their fishing nets back in 2003. These ceramics were found at a depth of about 54 metres (177 ft), located about 100 kilometres (62 mi) from the port city of Cirebon. The wreck was salvaged by a private company from 2004 to 2006. About 250,000 artefacts were recovered, 65% of which consisted mainly of Chinese ceramics dated from Five Dynasties period of 10th-century Imperial China, and also other ceramics from other parts of Asia. 10% was Near East and Indian glassware and gemstones, and the rest consisted of ingots, iron and other metals.

== Sunken ship ==
The ship was identified as a Western-Austronesian vessel of about 30 metres (98 ft) length, possibly built in the area around the Straits of Malacca. A number of repairs visible on the remains of the hull imply that the vessel had been in use for a considerable time before her sinking. The site of her foundering lies on a straight course from the Bangka Straits of southern Sumatra to the area around today's Semarang on Java. The stowage pattern of the cargo signals that most of the stoneware and ceramic cargo had been taken aboard in ports of Southern China, most possibly Guangzhou, where around that time the Nanhan Kingdom, one of the Ten Southern Kingdoms during the era of the Five Dynasties, was coming to an end; Fine Paste Ware kendis and vases from the Satingpra / Kra Isthmus area found in the higher layers of the site imply a stop there; Middle Eastern glasswares and semi-precious stones and Malay tin were added at a stop in one of the southern Sumatran ports of the Srivijayan federation. An analysis of the Chinese coins in the cargo allows pinpointing the sinking to around 970 CE.

== Auction ==
The salvaged artefacts were auctioned in 2006, subsequently salvagers split the sale 50-50 percent with Indonesian government. Considering the importance of this find for the studies of economy and trade history, also marine archaeology; experts, historians and archaeologists urged the Indonesian government to keep and preserve most of the wreck's contents intact. The government decided to keep 10 percent of the 76,000 recovered artefacts intact as the collection of Indonesian museum.

== See also ==
- Belitung shipwreck
- Borobudur ship
- Djong (ship)
- Srivijaya
- Archaeology of Indonesia
