= Subah, Sambas =

Subah
- District
- Interactive map of Subah
- Coordinates: 1°9′N 109°28′E
- Country: Indonesia
- Province: West Kalimantan
- Regency: Sambas
- Established: 31 May 2001
- District seat: Balai Gemuruh

Area
  - Total: 752.74 km^{2} (290.63 sq mi)

Population (2024)
  - Total: 25,333
  - Density: 33.654/km^{2} (87.164/sq mi)

Subah is a district in Sambas Regency, West Kalimantan, Indonesia. In 2024, it was inhabited by 25,333 people, and had a total area of 752.74 km^{2}.

== History ==
Subah was established on 31 May 2001, after being split off from the southern part of Sambas district.

== Geography ==
Subah District consists of eleven villages (desa):

- Balai Gemuruh
- Bukit Mulya
- Karaban Jaya
- Madak
- Mensade
- Mukti Raharja
- Sabung
- Sempurna
- Sungai Deden
- Sungai Sapa'
- Tebuah Elok
