= Sambas River =

River in Indonesia

Sambas River Sungai Sambas, Sungai Sambas Besar
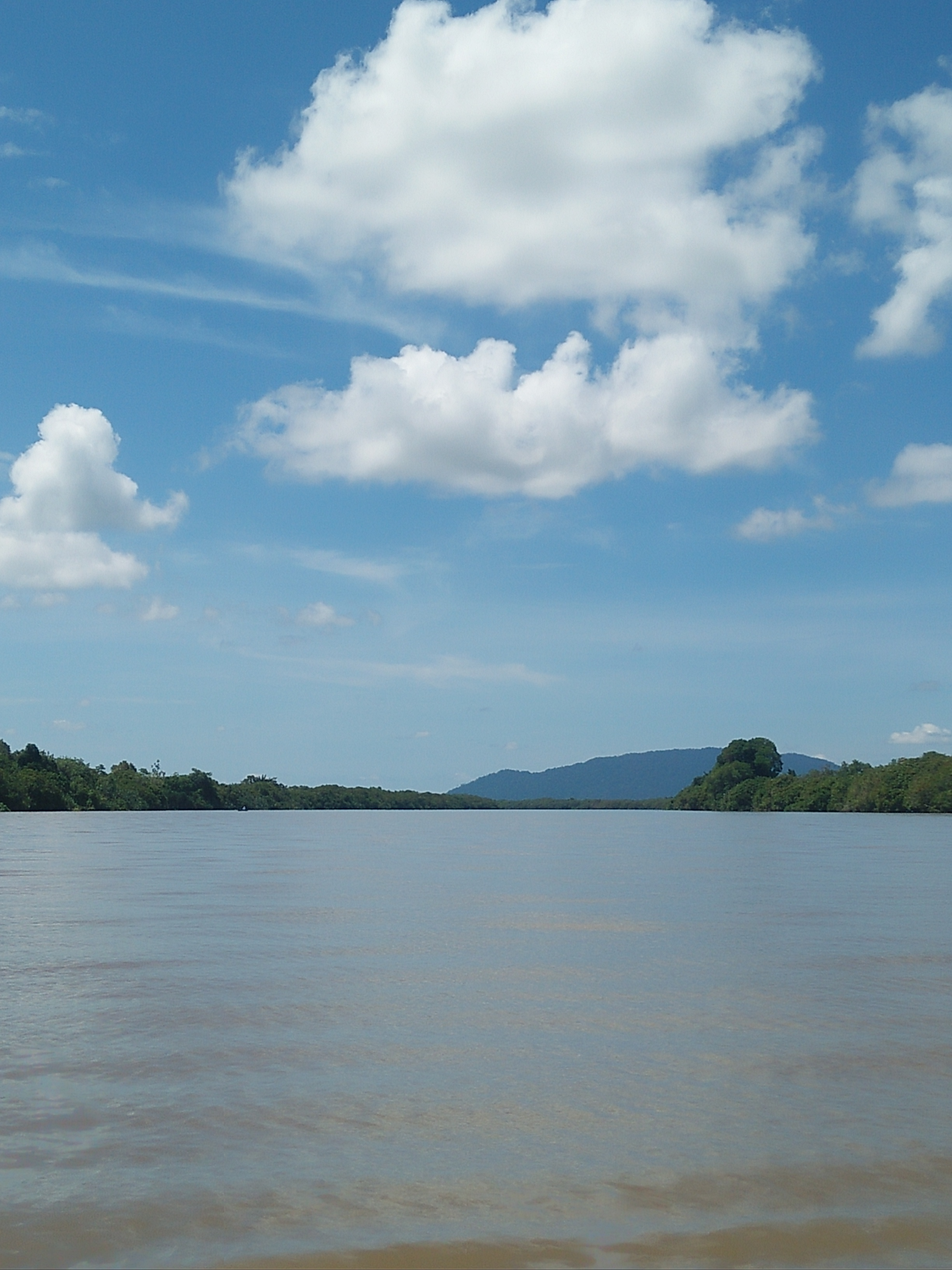
- Sambas river in Sambas Regency, West Kalimantan, viewed from the middle, at Sejangkung.

- River mouth location Sambas River (Indonesia)

Location
- Country: Indonesia

Physical characteristics
- Source
  - location: Bengkayang
- Mouth: South China Sea
  - location: Pemangkat
  - coordinates: 1°11′26″N 108°58′02″E
- Length: 233 km (145 mi)
- Width
  - minimum: 150 m (490 ft)
  - maximum: 400 m (1,300 ft)
- Depth
  - minimum: 10 m (33 ft)
  - maximum: 30 m (98 ft)

Sambas River, or specifically referred to Big Sambas River (Indonesian: Sungai Sambas Besar), is a river in Sambas Regency, West Kalimantan, Indonesia. The upriver part is located in Kabupaten Bengkayang, and flows through the town of Sambas, continuing to Pemangkat where it discharges into South China Sea.

== Hydrology ==
The river is considered deep. In its mouth area, the depth reaches 30 m, whereas in the upriver part it is about 10 m. The width of the river is 400 m on average, while only 150 m in upstream part. The length of river is about 233 km.

== Geography ==
The river flows in the western area of Borneo island with predominantly tropical rainforest climate (designated as Af in the Köppen-Geiger climate classification). It has a drainage area of 7,479 km^{2}. The annual average temperature in the area is 23 °C. The warmest month is May, when the average temperature is around 25 °C, and the coldest is January, at 21 °C. The average annual rainfall is 3542 mm. The wettest month is December, with an average of 485 mm rainfall, and the driest is June, with 106 mm rainfall.

== See also ==
- List of drainage basins of Indonesia
- List of rivers of Indonesia
- List of rivers of Kalimantan
