= Jagoi Babang =

- District
- Interactive map of Jagoi Babang
- Country: Indonesia
- Province: West Kalimantan
- Regency: Bengkayang
- Established: 17 June 1996
- District seat: Jagoi

Area
  - Total: 655.02 km^{2} (252.90 sq mi)

Population (2024)
  - Total: 10,012
  - Density: 15.285/km^{2} (39.588/sq mi)
- Time zone: UTC+07:00 (WIB)
- Postal code: 79286
- Regional code: 61.07.07

Jagoi Babang is a district in Bengkayang Regency, West Kalimantan, Indonesia . This area is located on the border of West Kalimantan with Sarawak (eastern border, approximately 1 hour to Sarawak City), Malaysia.

== History ==
Jagoi Babang District was officially established on 17 July 1996 from the northern part of Seluas District, which at the time was still part of Sambas Regency. Following the establishment of Bengkayang Regency in 1999, the district officially became part of the newly-established regency.

In 2004, the eastern portion of the district was cut off to form Siding District.

== Geography ==
Jagoi Babang District covers a diverse landscape characterized by tropical rainforests, rolling hills, and river valleys. The district's terrain includes a mix of lowland and upland areas, with the natural environment supporting a variety of flora and fauna. The region's geographical location contributes to its strategic importance and influences its local climate, which is typically hot and humid with significant rainfall throughout the year.

== Demographics ==
The population of Jagoi Babang District is ethnically diverse, with various indigenous groups residing in the area. The majority of the population consists of ethnic Malays and Dayaks, along with other smaller ethnic communities. The demographic composition influences the cultural practices, languages, and traditions observed in the district. The district is known for its cultural heritage, with traditional ceremonies, festivals, and local arts being an integral part of community life.

== Economy ==
The economy of Jagoi Babang District primarily relies on agriculture, with local farmers engaged in cultivating crops such as rice, rubber, and palm oil. Additionally, small-scale mining activities and forestry contribute to the local economy. The district's proximity to the Malaysian border also facilitates cross-border trade and economic interactions.

== Infrastructure ==
Jagoi Babang has a developing infrastructure, with road networks connecting it to other parts of Bengkayang Regency and neighboring regions. Access to essential services such as education and healthcare is improving, although challenges remain in reaching remote areas. The district is also working on enhancing its infrastructure to support economic growth and improve the quality of life for its residents.

== Challenges and development ==
Jagoi Babang faces several challenges, including infrastructure development, access to education and healthcare, and environmental sustainability. The local government and various organizations are actively working on development projects aimed at improving living conditions, promoting economic growth, and preserving the district's natural resources.

Overall, Jagoi Babang District is a region with a growing economy, reflecting both the opportunities and challenges of development in West Kalimantan.
