= Pemangkat =

Coordinates: 1.1768°N 108.9624°E

- Town
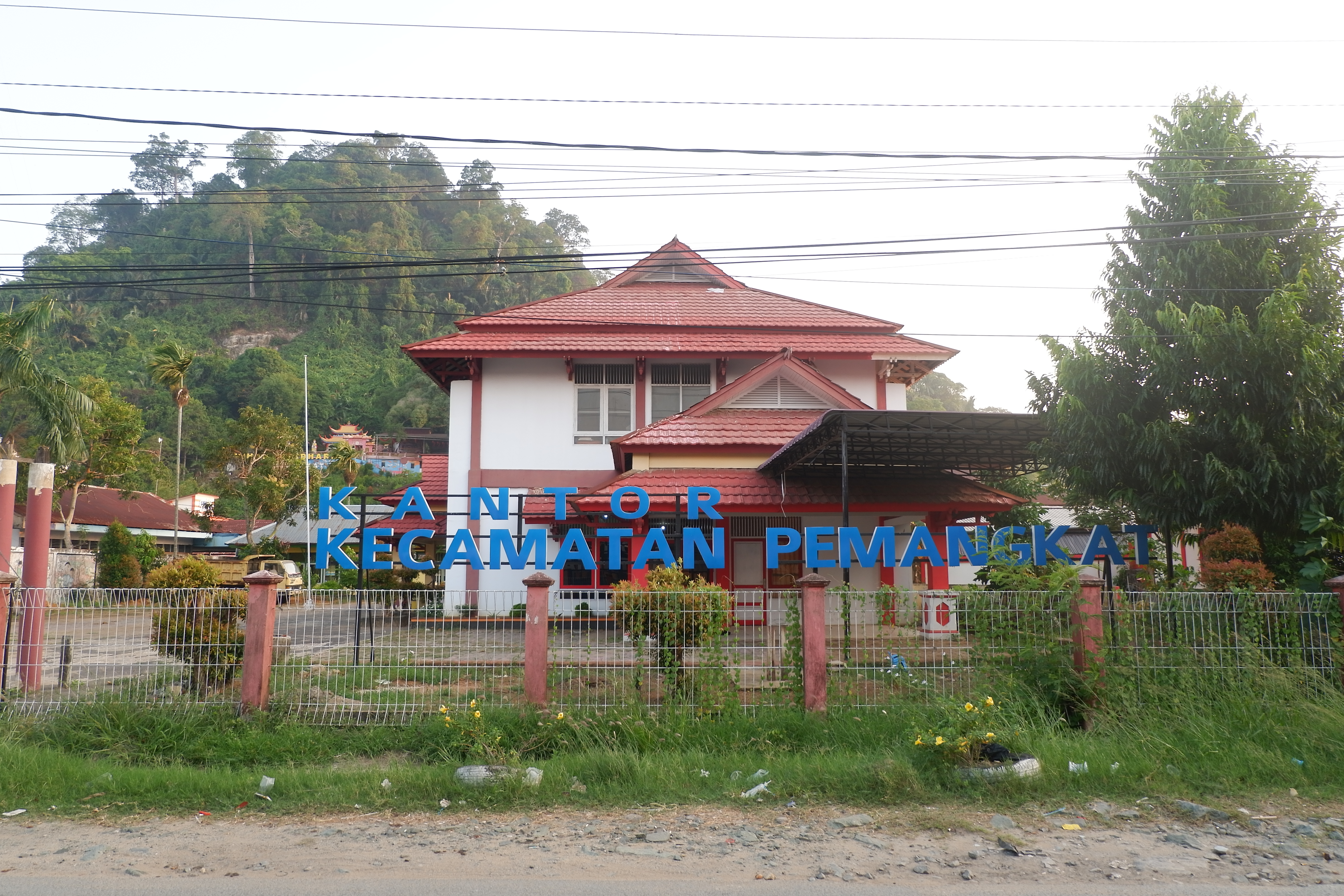
- Pemangkat district office
- Interactive map of Pemangkat
- Country: Indonesia
- Province: West Kalimantan
- Regency: Sambas Regency
- Villages/Sub-districts: 8

Government

Area
  - Total: 97.05 km^{2} (37.47 sq mi)

Population
  - Total: 54,259
  - Density: 559.1/km^{2} (1,448/sq mi)

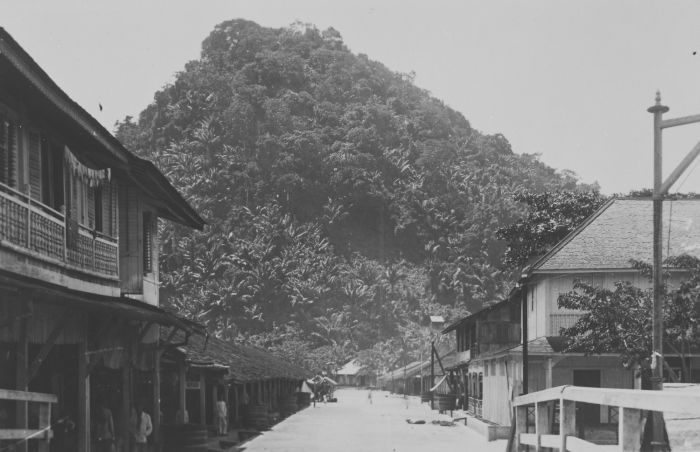
Pemangkat in the 1920s

Pemangkat (Chinese: 邦戛, Pinyin: Bāngjiá) is a coastal town and an administrative district (kecamatan) at the mouth of the Sambas River in Sambas Regency, West Kalimantan Province of Indonesia. It is located to the northwest of the provincial capital Pontianak, and had 54,259 inhabitants in mid 2025.

== Demographic ==
Most of the Pemangkat population are Malay and Tionghoa. The natives of Pemangkat are commonly referred to in Hakka language as Pangkatnyin, meaning people of Pemangkat. The district is subdivided into eight administrative villages (desa), listed below with their populations as at mid 2024.

- Pemangkat Kota (town) (10,447)
- Sebatuan (3,710)
- Jelutung (4,994)
- Perapakan (5,117)
- Lonam (6,357)
- Penjajap (12,072)
- Harapan (5,600)
- Gugah Sejahtera (3,781)

== Geography ==
Pemangkat has a famous temple, Hakka: Shin Mu Nyong, which is located on the Elephant mount (Indonesian: Gunung Gajah). This temple is a worship place to a god whom local Chinese believe to be protecting fishermen when sailing out on the sea. This small town still practices many traditional Chinese cultures which can rarely be seen in other places. It has many natural resorts, such as Selindung waterfall, Tanjung Batu beach and Sinam beach.
