= Sambas Treasure =

Hoard of Buddhist sculptures

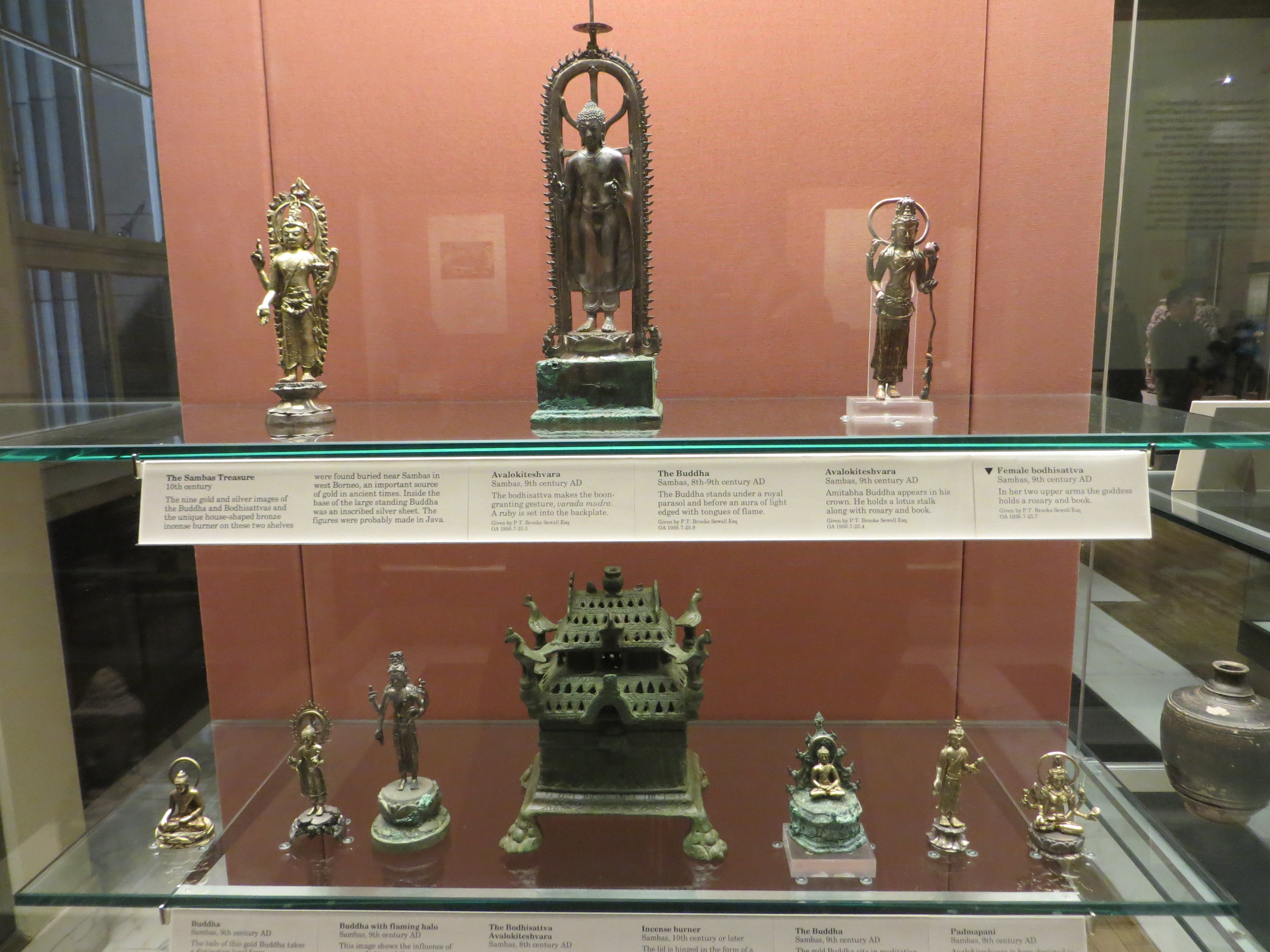
- Sambas Treasure as displayed in the British Museum
- Material: Gold, silver, and bronze
- Created: 8th–9th centuries AD
- Present location: British Museum, London

The Sambas Treasure is a hoard of ancient gold and silver buddhist sculptures found near the town of Sambas in west Borneo that now form part of the British Museum's collection. Dating from 8th–9th centuries AD, they pre-date the coming of Islam to the Indonesian archipelago by four centuries and were probably made in Java.

== History of Buddhism in Southeast Asia ==
Until Islam became the dominant religion in Indonesia in the 13th Century, both Buddhism and Hinduism were adopted from the India subcontinent as the principal local religions. Over time, many buddhist sculptures were transported to the islands by pilgrims returning from holy sites in eastern India. These in turn inspired local craftsmen who developed their own styles and traits. The buddhist sculptures from Sambas Treasure were almost certainly made in Java based on artistic models that were developed in eastern India centuries before.

== Discovery and ownership ==
The Sambas Treasure was found in a large earthenware pot on the south-west coast of Borneo sometime during the 1940s. It was then owned by the collector Tan Yeok Seong, a Singaporean historian of Southeast Asia and a collector of historical artifacts. The treasure was subsequently bought by the philanthropist PT Brooke Sewell, who donated it to the British Museum in 1956.

== Description ==
The hoard is composed of nine gold and silver buddha and bodhisattva images. The largest figure is approximately 18 cm high and represents a standing Buddha made of sold silver. In addition to the Buddhist sculptures, the treasure includes a bronze incense burner in the shape of a house and a silver votive plaque with text in dhāraṇī, which was found in the base of the large Buddha figure. The high quality of the craftsmanship and the use of precious metals such as gold and silver suggest they were originally made for an important local dignitary or patron.

== Gallery ==
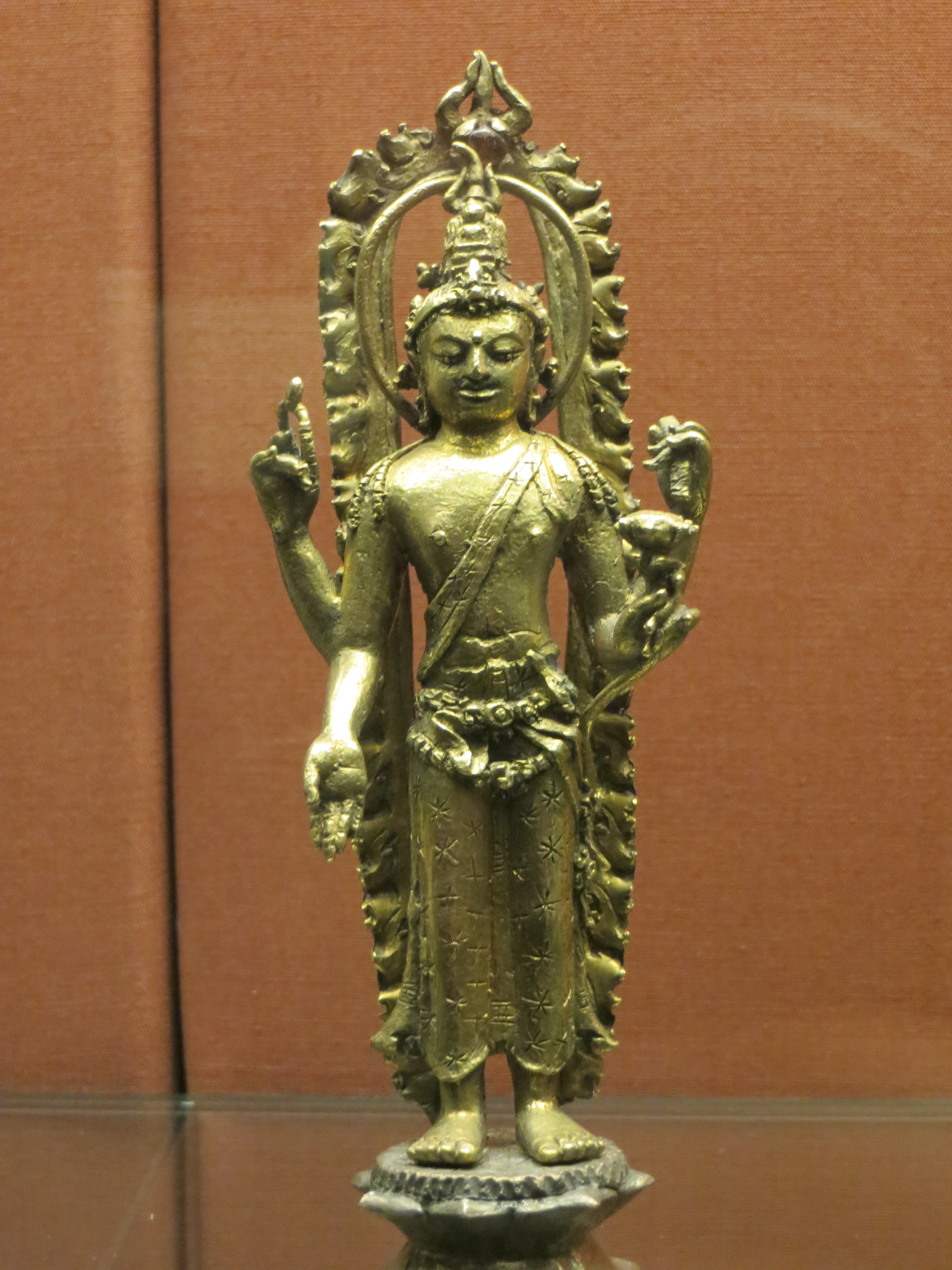
Avalokiteshvara figure with ruby in the backplate

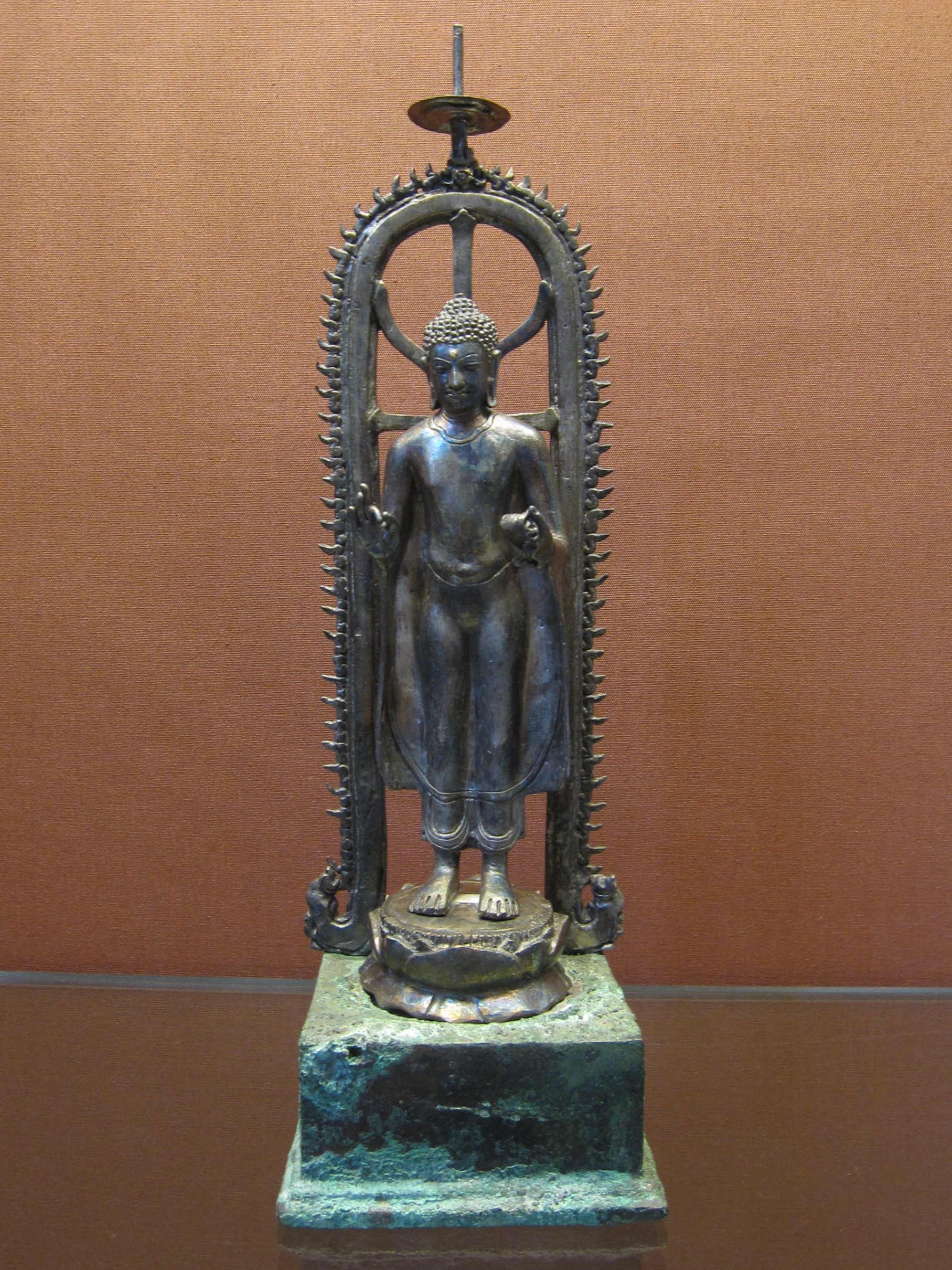
Silver standing Buddha under a parasol

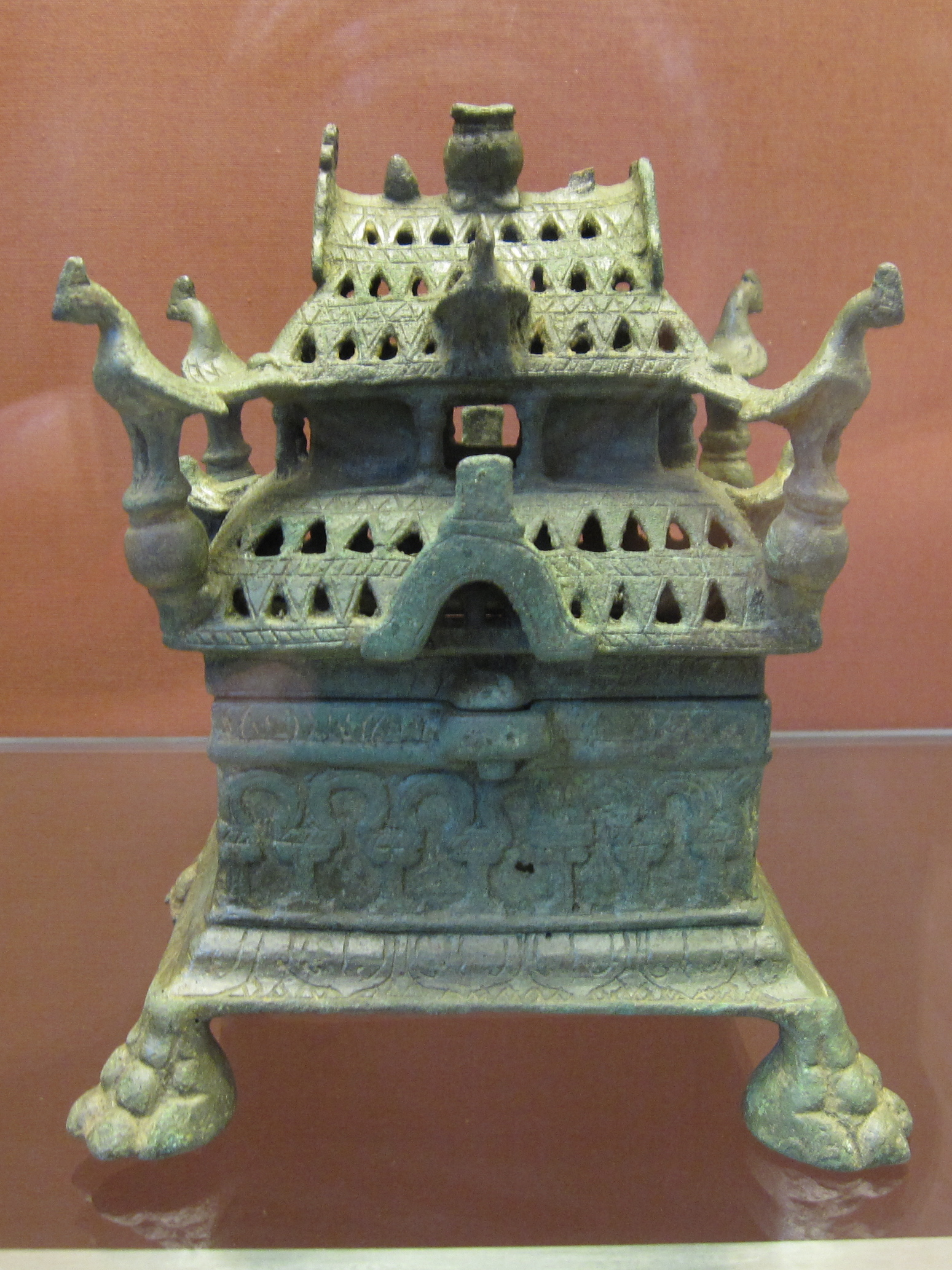
Bronze incense burner in the shape of a house

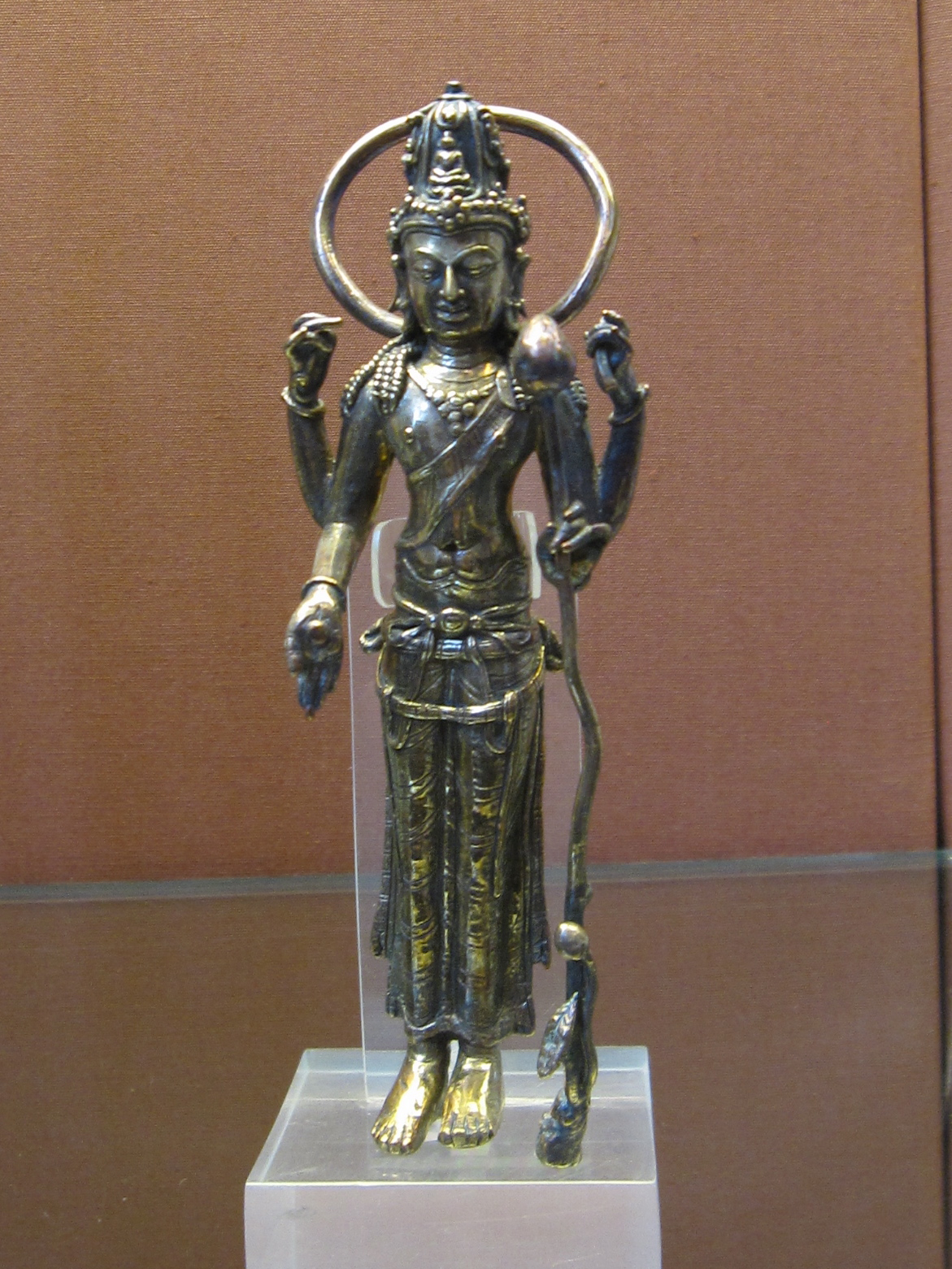
Avalokiteshvara holding a rosary and a book

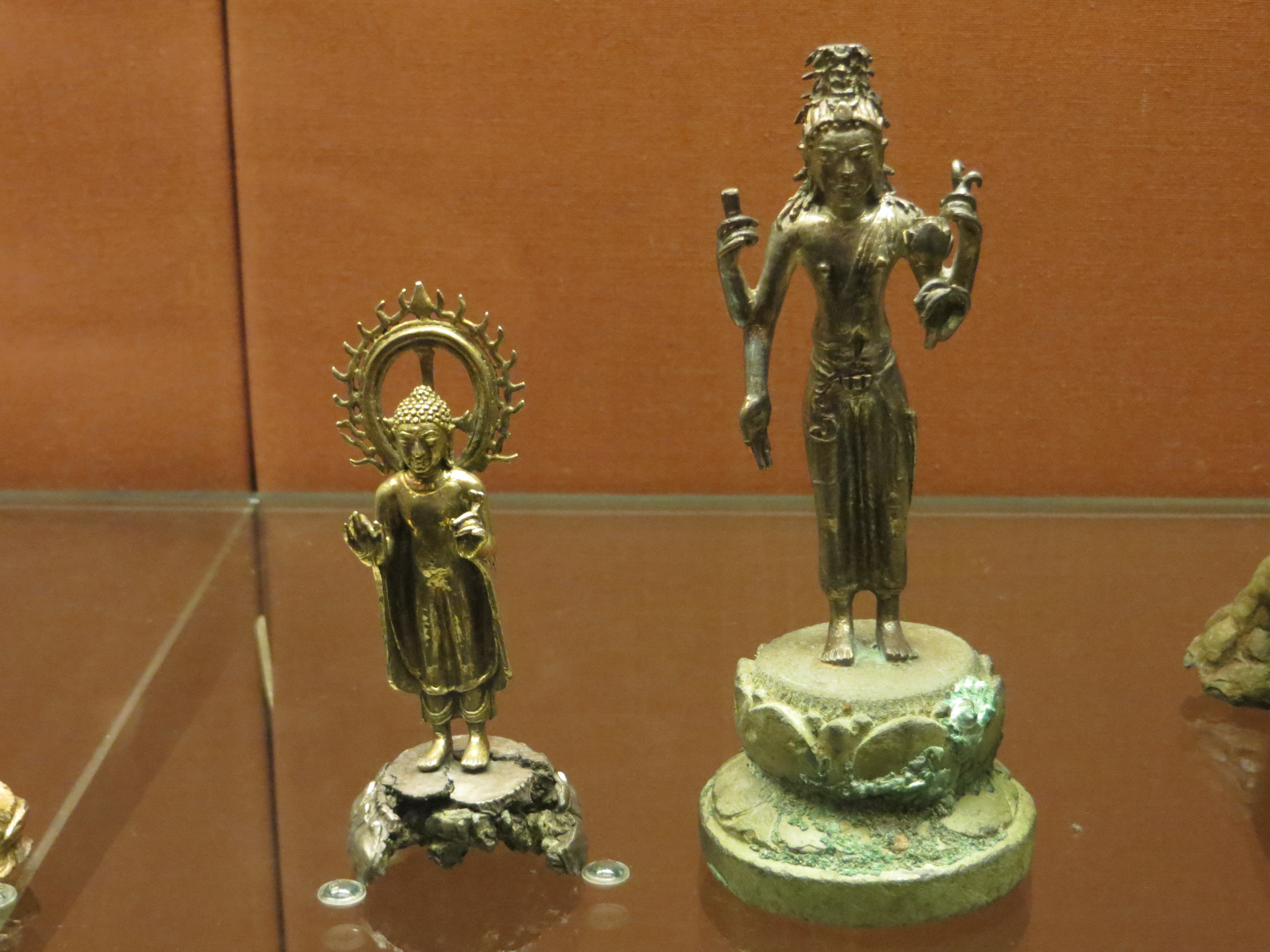
Buddha with flaming halo and bodhisattva avalokiteshvara

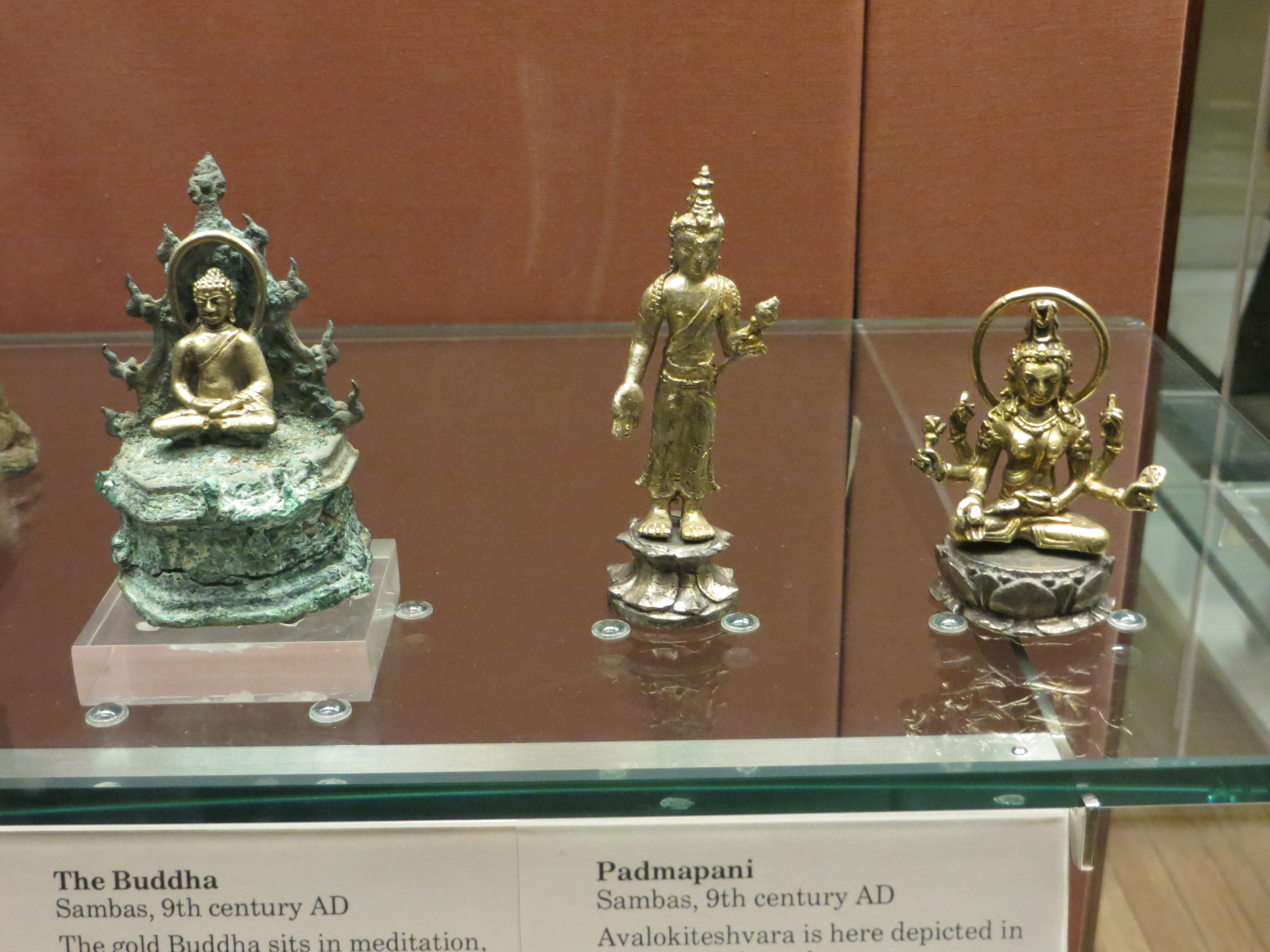
Seated Buddha, Padmapani and female bodhisattva

== Bibliography ==
- N. Tarling, The Cambridge History of South East Asia (Cambridge University Press, 1992)
- R. Fisher, Buddhist art and architecture (London, Thames & Hudson, 1993)
