= Sajingan Besar =

- District
- Interactive map of Sajingan Besar
- Country: Indonesia
- Province: West Kalimantan
- Regency: Sambas
- Established: 17 June 1996
- District seat: Kaliau

Area
  - Total: 1,035.59 km^{2} (399.84 sq mi)

Population (mid 2024)
  - Total: 12,909
  - Density: 12.465/km^{2} (32.285/sq mi)
- Time zone: UTC+07:00 (WIB)
- Postal code: 79467
- Regional code: 61.01.09

Sajingan Besar is an administrative district ([kecamatan) located in the northern part of Sambas Regency, part of West Kalimantan Province of Indonesia. The district is characterized by its diverse landscape, which includes tropical forests, rivers, and lowland areas. The district is bordered by Malaysia to the north, highlighting its strategic geographical location in Borneo.

== History ==
Sajingan Besar was officially established on 17 July 1996, and was formed from five villages (desa) taken from three different districts (Santaban and Senatab villages in the centre from Teluk Keramat District, Kaliau and Sebunga villages in the south from Sejangkung District, and Sungai Bening village in the north from Paloh District).

== Geography ==
Sajingan Besar is part of the Sambas Regency, which is one of the administrative regencies in West Kalimantan (Provinsi Kalimantan Barat). The district's geographic location makes it significant due to its proximity to the international border.

== Administrative Structure ==
The district is administratively divided into five administrative villages (desa), which are the basic units of local governance. Each village is managed by a headman who oversees local affairs and coordinates with the district administration. Sajingan Besar operates under the jurisdiction of the Sambas Regency government, which provides oversight and coordination of development activities within the district.

== Demographics and Culture ==
The population of Sajingan Besar is diverse, with various ethnic groups contributing to the cultural tapestry of the district. The local culture is influenced by traditional Dayaks and Malays heritage, reflected in local customs, festivals, and community practices.

== Environmental and Conservation Efforts ==
Sajingan Besar is home to significant natural resources and areas of environmental importance. Conservation efforts are ongoing to manage and protect the district's natural habitats, which are vital for local biodiversity and ecological balance.

== Infrastructure and Development ==
Sajingan Besar has been experiencing gradual development in infrastructure, including improvements in transportation and public services. The district's road networks and transportation facilities are essential for connecting it with other regions of West Kalimantan and facilitating trade and mobility.

Overall, Sajingan Besar is a district with a unique geographic and cultural profile within the Sambas Regency, contributing to the broader socio-economic and cultural fabric of West Kalimantan Province.
