= Sambas (town) =

- Town
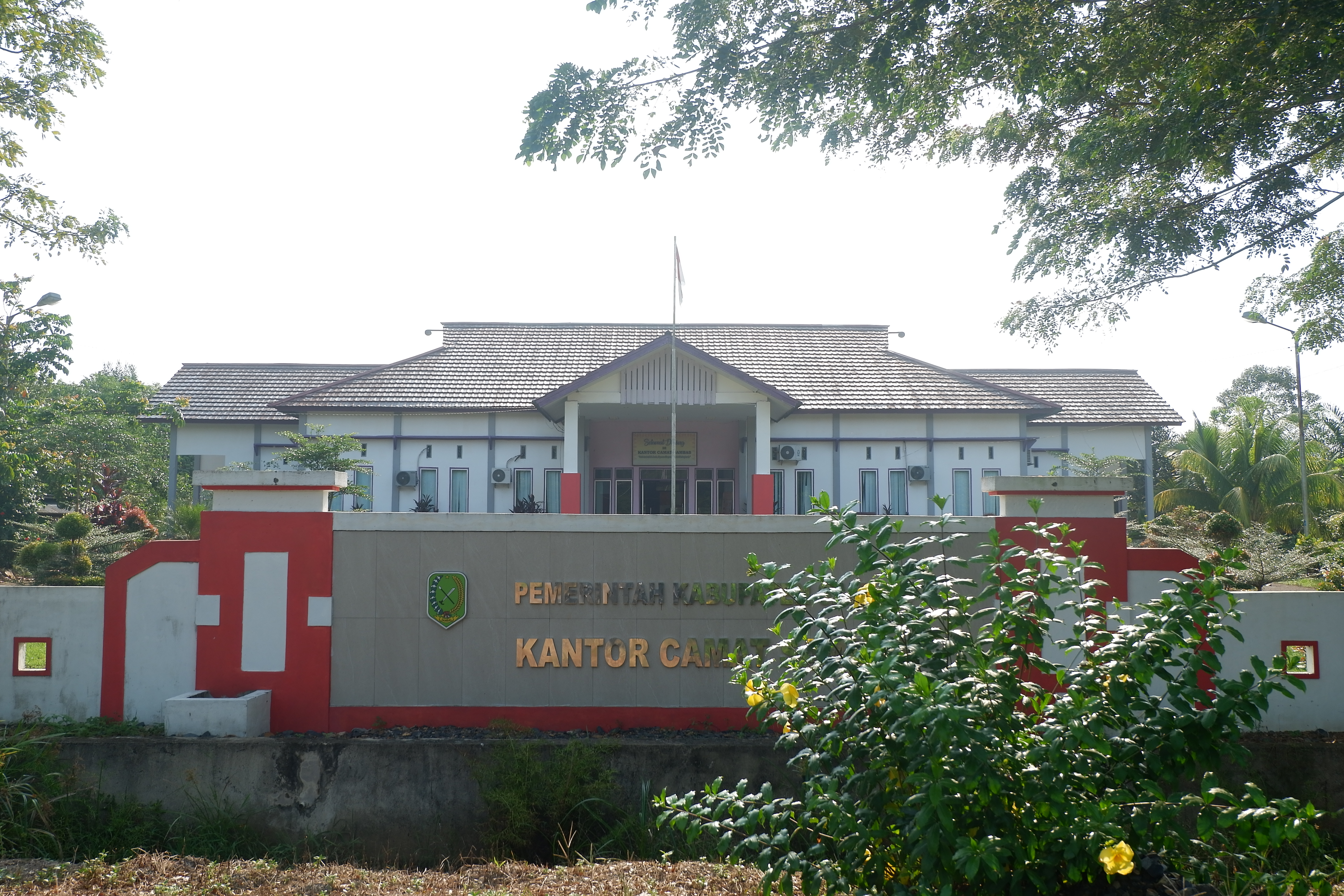
- Sambas District office

- Location within Kalimantan Location within Indonesia
- Coordinates: 1°21′45″N 109°18′15″E
- Country: Indonesia
- Province: West Kalimantan
- Regency: Sambas Regency

Sambas is a town and the regency seat of Sambas Regency (Kabupaten Sambas), on the island of Kalimantan. Sambas Regency is one of the regencies of West Kalimantan province in Indonesia.

== History ==
The town was the center of the Sultanate of Sambas. In 1813, it was captured by the British in the second Sambas expedition, but the British did not occupy the town for long and the Sultan was restored later that year.

In 1963, a new district named Sejangkung District was established from the northeastern portion of Sambas District. On 21 June 2001, a new Subah District was cut out from the southern part of Sambas District. In 2004, new Sebawi and Sajad Districts were split off from the western and eastern portions of Sambas District, respectively.

== Geography ==
Sambas town is located on the south side of the Sambas River between 1°11'20" and 1°24'48" north latitude and between 109°09'16" and 109°26'23" east longitude. With an area of 220.03 square kilometres (84.95 sq mi), Sambas town area covers just 3.7% of the area of Sambas Regency. The town district had 57,295 inhabitants at the 2020 Census, and had increased to 60,880 at the official estimates for mid 2024.

The following are the boundaries of Sambas town:

North	Teluk Keramat District and Sejangkung District
South	Subah District
West	Sebawi District
East	Subah District

== Villages ==
The town district is composed of 18 villages (desa), listed below with their populations as at mid 2024.

- Sungai Rambah (3,886)
- Gapura (4,565)
- Kartiasa (6,407)
- Saing Rambi (4,946)
- Lumbang (5,618)
- Durian (2,531)
- Pasar Melayu (1,168)
- Pendawan (2,514)
- Tanjung Bugis (1,929)
- Lubuk Dagang (3,859)
- Dalam Kaum (5,591)
- Tanjung Mekar (2,202)
- Tumuk Manggis (2,449)
- Jagur (1,361)
- Lorong (3,757)
- Sebayan (3,212)
- Sumber Harapan (3,052)
- Semangau (1,833)

== Climate ==
Sambas has a tropical rainforest climate (Af) with heavy to very heavy rainfall year-round.

Climate data for Sambas
Month	Jan	Feb	Mar	Apr	May	Jun	Jul	Aug	Sep	Oct	Nov	Dec	Year
Mean daily maximum °C (°F)	29.4 (84.9)	29.6 (85.3)	30.6 (87.1)	31.2 (88.2)	31.7 (89.1)	31.3 (88.3)	31.2 (88.2)	31.0 (87.8)	31.1 (88.0)	31.0 (87.8)	30.6 (87.1)	30.0 (86.0)	30.7 (87.3)
Daily mean °C (°F)	25.9 (78.6)	26.0 (78.8)	26.6 (79.9)	27.0 (80.6)	27.3 (81.1)	27.0 (80.6)	26.8 (80.2)	26.7 (80.1)	26.9 (80.4)	26.9 (80.4)	26.6 (79.9)	26.2 (79.2)	26.7 (80.0)
Mean daily minimum °C (°F)	22.4 (72.3)	22.5 (72.5)	22.6 (72.7)	22.8 (73.0)	22.9 (73.2)	22.7 (72.9)	22.5 (72.5)	22.5 (72.5)	22.7 (72.9)	22.8 (73.0)	22.6 (72.7)	22.5 (72.5)	22.6 (72.7)
Average rainfall mm (inches)	360 (14.2)	256 (10.1)	237 (9.3)	223 (8.8)	200 (7.9)	174 (6.9)	141 (5.6)	185 (7.3)	191 (7.5)	275 (10.8)	322 (12.7)	368 (14.5)	2,932 (115.6)
Source: Climate-Data.org

== Gallery ==
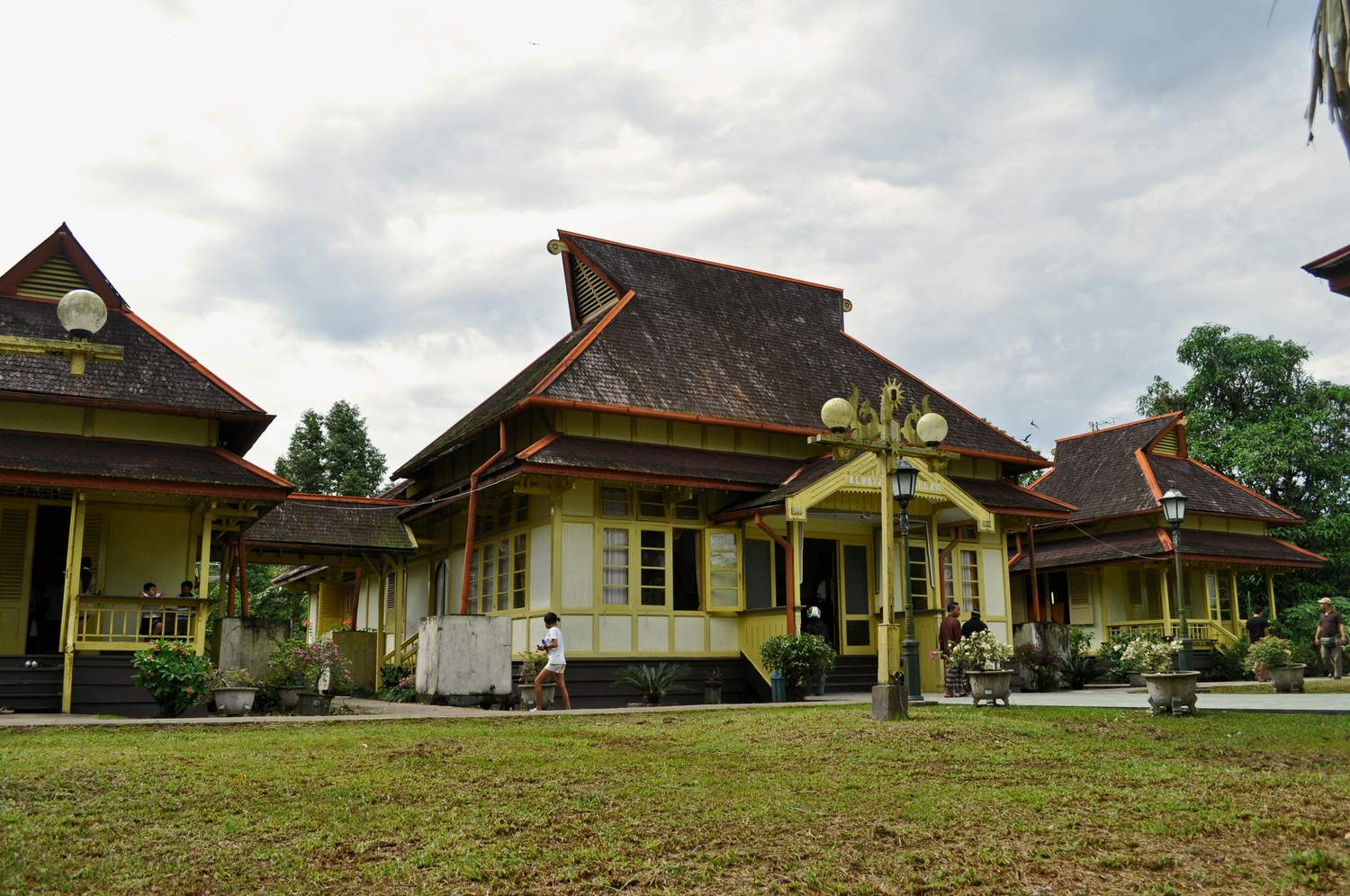
Alwatzikhoebillah Palace

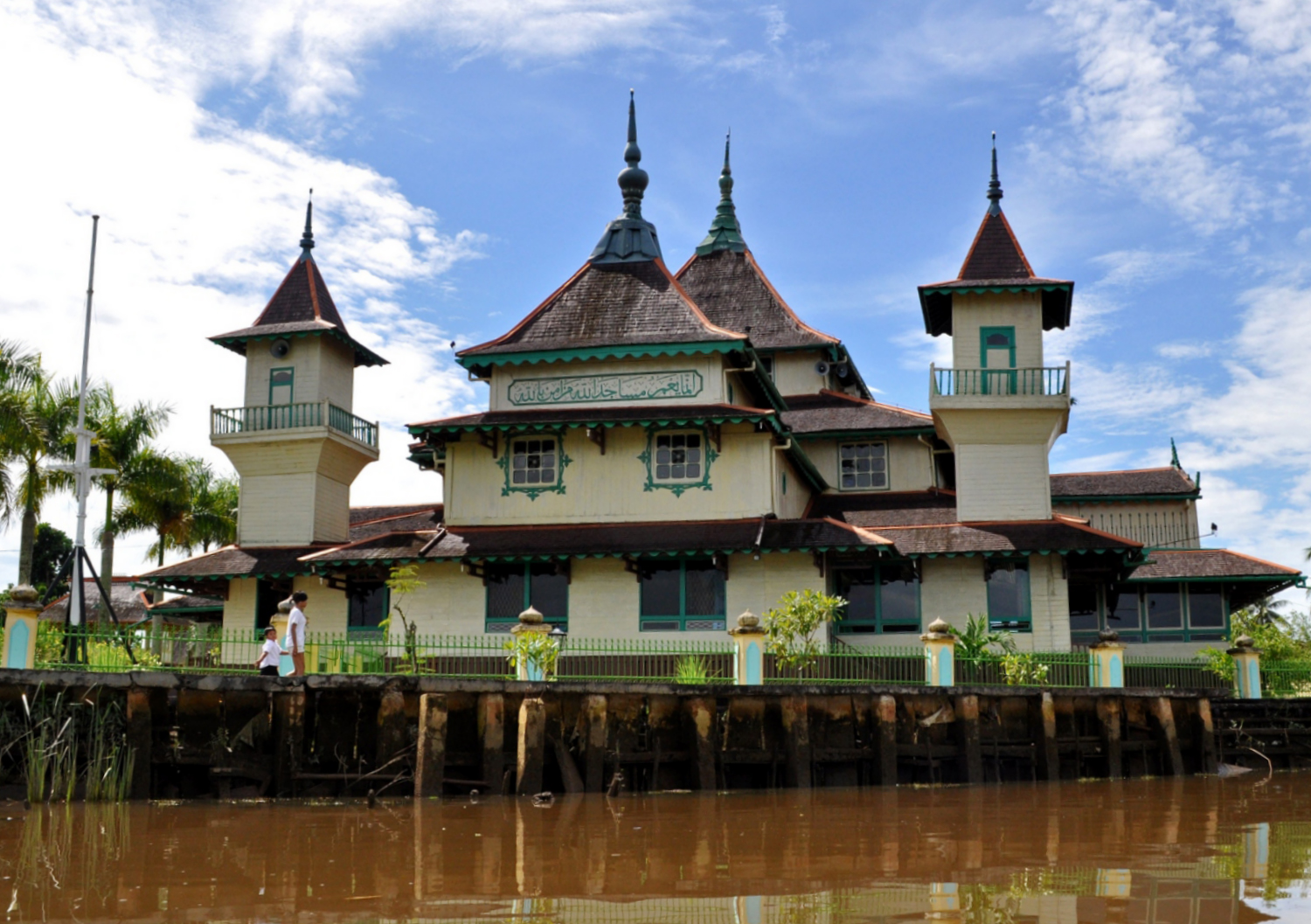
Sultan Muhammad Syafi'oeddin II Mosque

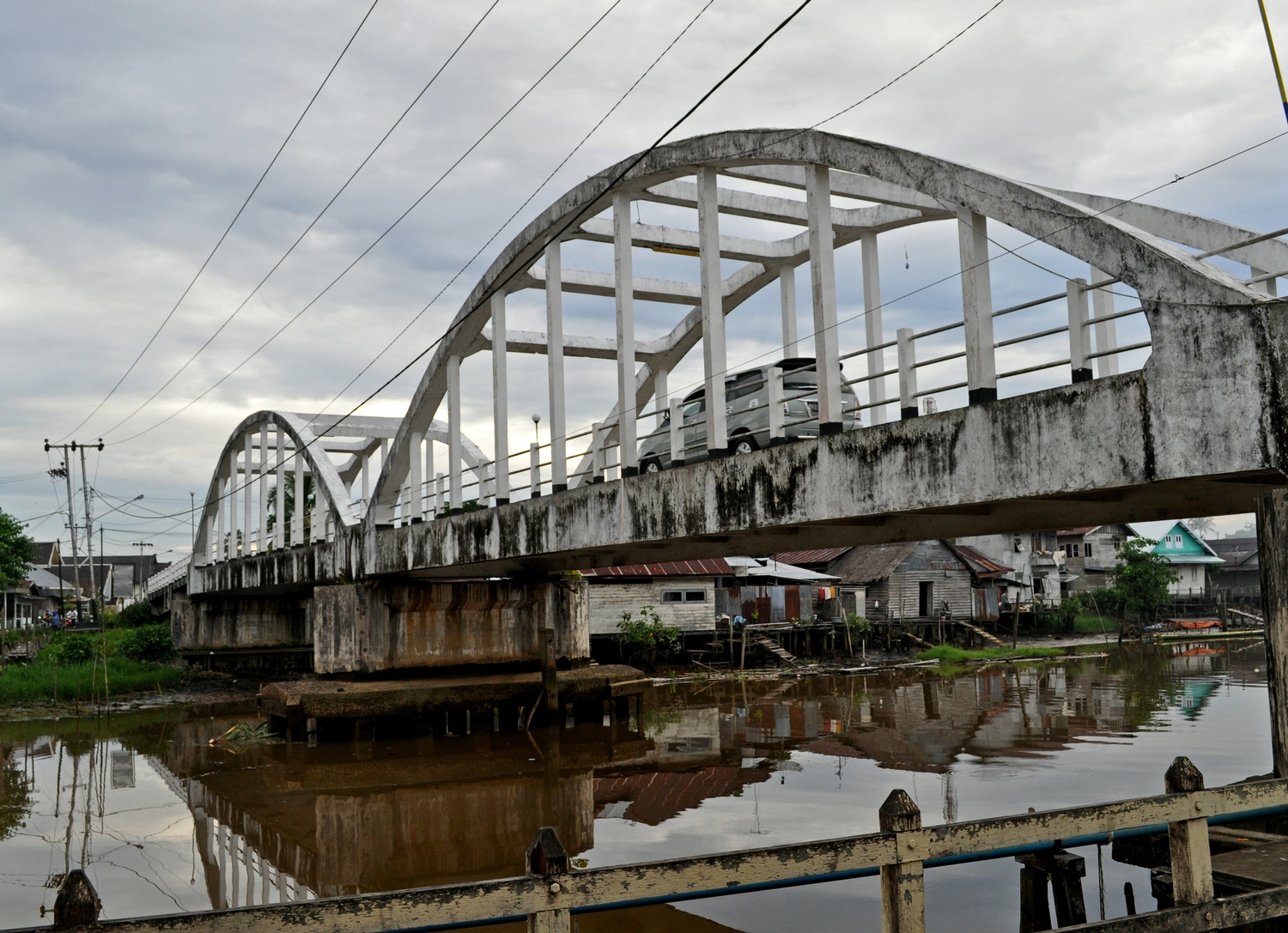
Old bridge made by Dutch

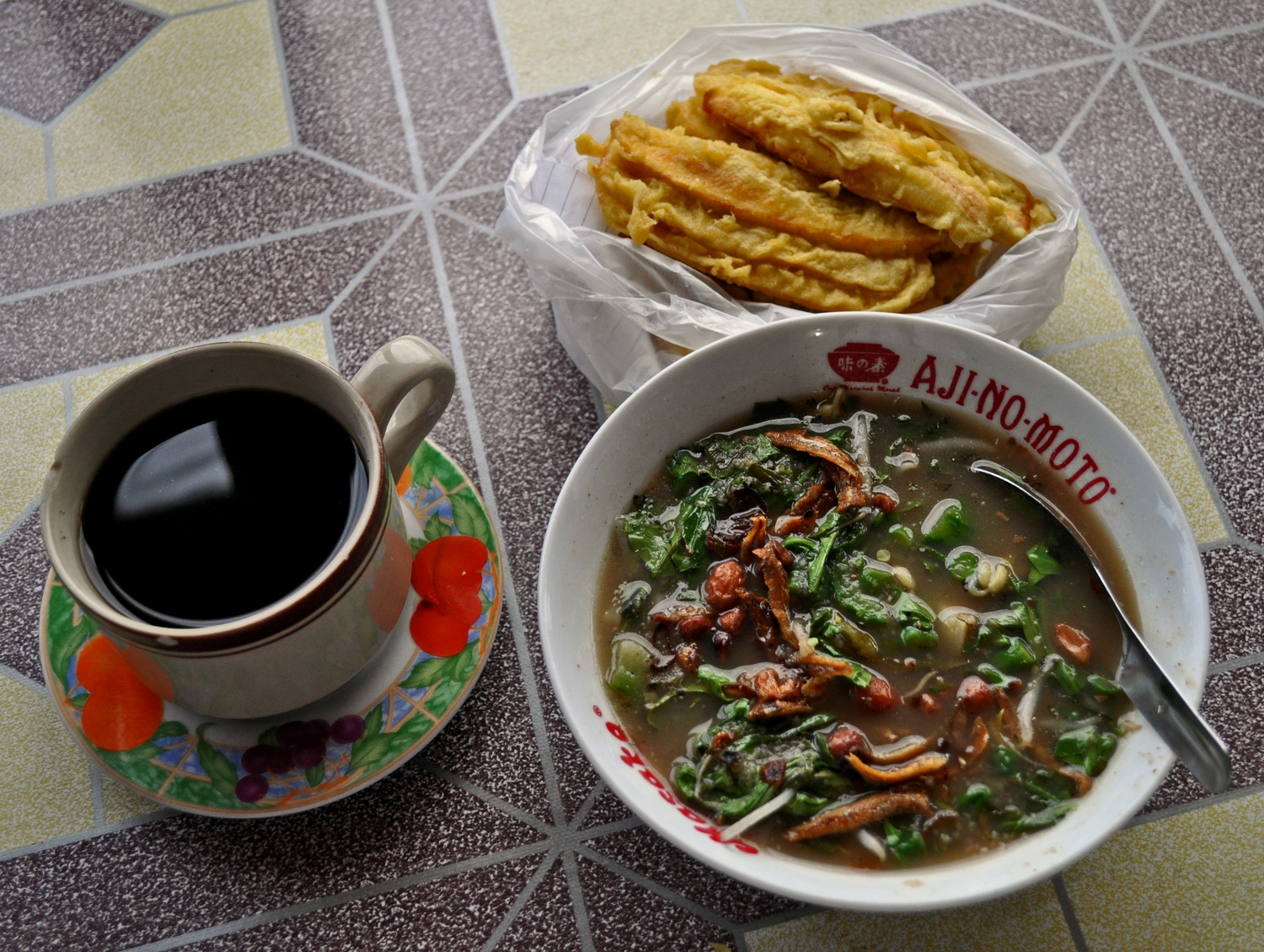
Bubur pedas, Sambas cuisine
