= Bengkayang Regency =

Regency in West Kalimantan, Indonesia

Bengkayang Regency Kabupaten Bengkayang
- Regency
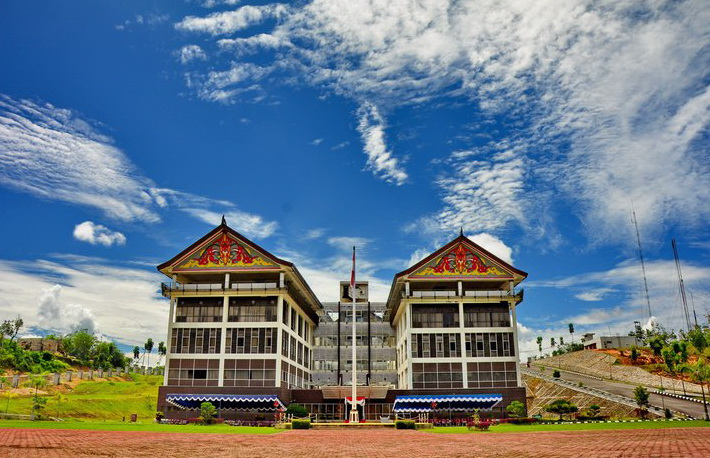
- Office building of Bengkayang Regent

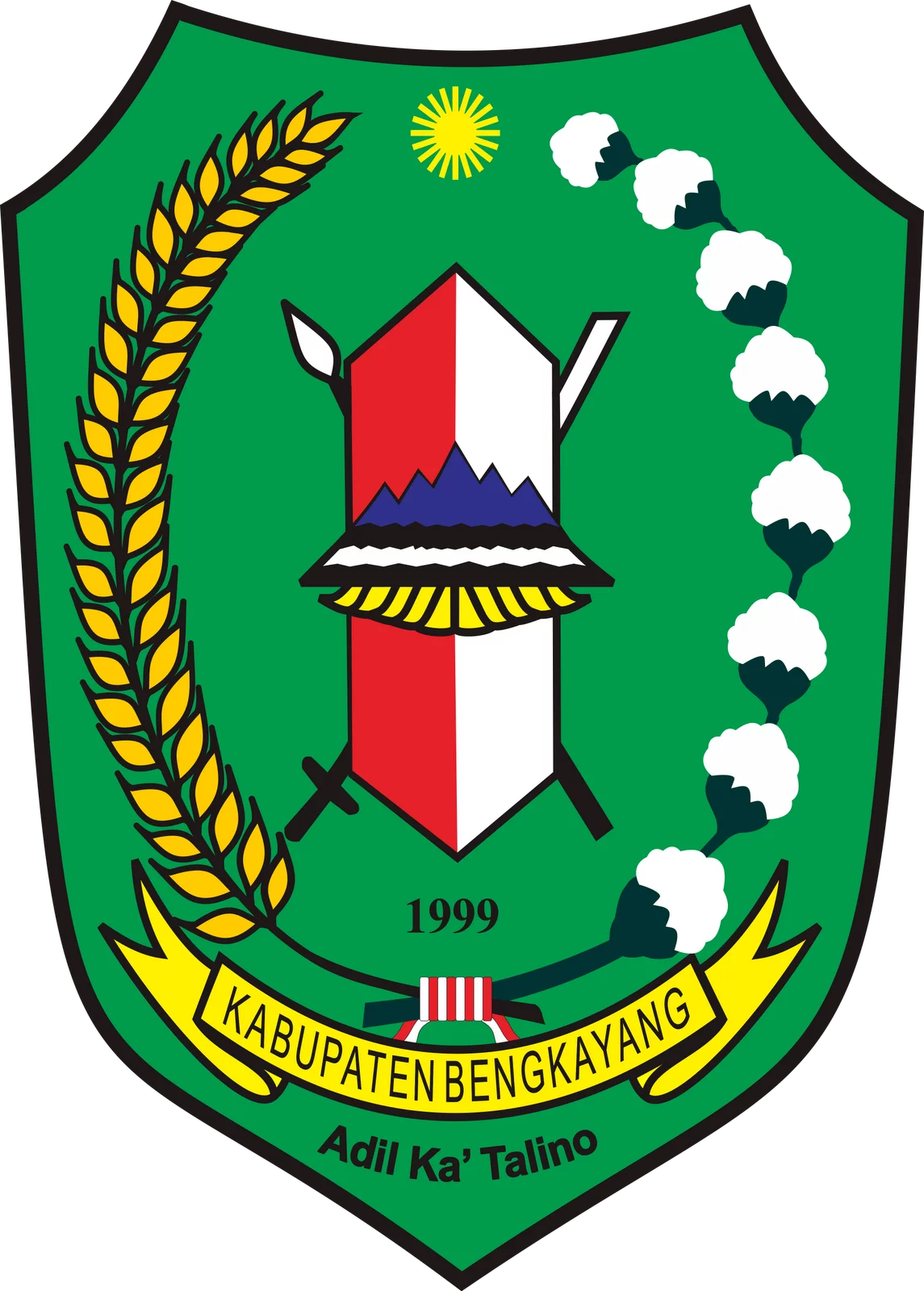
- Coat of arms
- Motto: Adil Ka' Talino (Fair to Others)
- Location within West Kalimantan

- Location in Kalimantan and Indonesia Bengkayang Regency (Indonesia)
- Coordinates: 1.0691°N 109.6639°E
- Country: Indonesia; Sarawak (part of the Borneo States)
- Province: West Kalimantan
- Capital: Bengkayang

Government
  - Regent: Sebastianus Darwis
  - Vice Regent: Syamsul Rizal

Area
  - Total: 5,382.74 km^{2} (2,078.29 sq mi)

Population (mid 2025 estimate)
  - Total: 307,823
  - Density: 57.1870/km^{2} (148.114/sq mi)
- Time zone: UTC+7 (IWST)
- Area code: (+62) 562
- Website: bengkayangkab.go.id

Bengkayang Regency (Chinese: 孟嘉影) is a regency ("kabupaten") in West Kalimantan Province of Indonesia, (on the island of Borneo). The area was originally a part of Sambas Regency, but following the expansion of the population in that area, Sambas Regency was divided into a smaller Sambas Regency and a new Bengkayang Regency on 20 April 1999, and then Singkawang City was subsequently cut out of Bengkayang Regency on 21 June 2001. The regency now covers an area of 5,382.74 km^{2}, and had a population of 215,277 at the 2010 Census and 286,366 at the 2020 Census; the official estimate as at mid 2025 was 307,823 (comprising 159,583 males and 148,240 females). The administrative centre is in the town of Bengkayang.

Bengkayang is in northern West Kalimantan, sharing a border with Sarawak in Malaysia. With arable land and favourable relief, the agricultural sector is the main economic source. Bengkayang is also rich in natural resources.

Bengkayang is still lagging in term of economic development, but there is a hope that providing local autonomy will catalyze development. A water processing plant has been developed, so the population can enjoy access to clean water.

== Administrative districts ==
When Bengkayang Regency was established in 1999, it originally composed of ten districts (including three districts within the administrative city of Singkawang), with the most recent at that time being Jagoi Babang, which was split off from the northern part of Seluas district in 1996 when the regency is still part of Sambas Regency. On 21 June 2001, Singkawang was officially established as an autonomous city by splitting it off from Bengkayang Regency, reducing the number of districts of that regency to seven. In 2002, three new districts were established (Monterado District was split off from the western part of Samalantan District, Teriak District was split off from the eastern part of Bengkayang District, and Suti Semarang District was split off from the western part of Ledo District), increasing the quantity of districts back to ten. In 2004, another four new districts were established (Capkala District was cut out from the eastern part of Sungai Raya District, Sungai Betung District was cut out from the western part of Bengkayang District, Lumar District was cut out from the southern part of Ledo District, and Siding District was split off from the western part of Jagoi Babang District), increasing the number to fourteen districts. In 2006, three more districts were established (Sungai Raya Kepulauan District was split off from the northern part of Sungai Raya District, Lembah Bawang District was split off from the northern part of Samalantan District, and Tujuh Belas District was re-established by splitting off from the eastern part of Sanggau Ledo District).

The regency is thus now divided into seventeen districts (kecamatan), tabulated below with their areas and their populations at the 2010 Census and the 2020 Census, together with the official estimates as at mid 2025. They are grouped below into three geographical sectors, which have no administrative significance. The table also includes the locations of the district administrative centres, the number of administrative villages in each district (a total of 122 rural desa and 2 urban kelurahan - the latter both in Bengkayang District), and its post code.

Kode Wilayah	Name of District (kecamatan)	Year formed	Area in km^{2}	Pop'n Census 2010	Pop'n Census 2020	Pop'n Estimate mid 2025	Admin centre	No. of villages	Post code
61.07.01	Sungai Raya (Raya River) ^{(a)}	—	75.85	18,333	23,497	24,790	Sungai Duri	5	79272
61.07.11	Capkala	2004 (from Sungai Raya)	46.36	7,579	9,655	10,156	Capkala	6	79271
61.07.15	Sungai Raya Kepulauan (Raya River Islands) ^{(b)}	2006 (from Sungai Raya)	237.87	20,922	29,015	31,802	Sungai Raya	5	79273
Sub-totals	for coastal sector		360.08	46,834	62,167	66,748		16	
61.07.02	Samalantan	—	234.69	18,240	22,882	23,892	Samalantan	7	79280
61.07.08	Monterado	2002 (from Samalantan)	317.17	24,453	33,530	36,550	Monterado	11	79181
61.07.16	Lembah Bawang (Onion Valley)	2006 (from Samalantan)	360.80	5,191	6,476	6,744	Papan Uduk	8	79281
61.07.04	Bengkayang (district)	—	167.05	23,764	33,385	36,823	Sebalo	6 ^{(c)}	79212 & 79213
61.07.09	Teriak	2002 (from Bengkayang)	299.70	12,464	17,001	18,485	Bana	18	79214
61.07.14	Sungai Betung (Betung River)	2004 (from Bengkayang)	182.39	8,919	12,193	13,272	Suka Maju	4	79211
61.07.03	Ledo	—	408.48	11,076	14,274	15,100	Lesabela	12	79283
61.07.10	Suti Semarang	2002 (from Ledo)	357.85	4,579	5,972	6,354	Suti Semarang	8	79288
61.07.13	Lumar	2004 (from Ledo)	373.51	5,764	8,111	8,953	Tiga Berkat	5	79282
Sub-totals	for central sector		2,701.64	114,460	153,824	166,173		79	
61.07.06	Sanggau Ledo	—	273.05	11,198	15,197	16,483	Lembang	5	79284
61.07.17	Tujuh Belas	2006 (from Sanggau Ledo)	323.13	11,216	15,243	16,544	Pisak	4	79250
61.07.05	Seluas	—	506.50	17,051	20,930	21,625	Seluas	6	79285
61.07.07	Jagoi Babang	1996 (from Seluas)	655.02	8,277	10,848	11,569	Jagoi	6	79286
61.07.12	Siding	2004 (from Jagoi Babang)	563.32	6,251	8,157	8,681	Hlibuie	8	79287
Sub-totals	for northern sector		2,321.02	53,983	70,375	74,902		29	
Totals	for regency		5,382.74	215,277	286,366	307,823	Bengkayang	124	

Note: (a) the southern part of the regency's coastal strip. (b) the northern part of the regency's coastal strip, including 12 offshore islands. (c) comprising 2 kelurahan (Sebalo and Bumi Emas) and 4 desa.

== List of Bengkayang Regents and Vice Regents ==
Regent	Vice Regent	Took office	Last Office	Notice
Jacobus Luna		1999	2000	
Jacobus Luna	Moses Ahie	2000	2005	First Period
Jacobus Luna	Suryadman Gidot	2005	2010	Second Period
Suryadman Gidot	Agustinus Naon	2010	2015	First Period
Suryadman Gidot	Agustinus Naon	2015	2019	Second Period
Agustinus Naon		2019	2020	Acting
Yohanes Budiman		2020	2020	Acting
Sebastianus Darwis	Syamsul Rizal	2021	present	

== Climate ==
Bengkayang has a tropical rainforest climate (Af) with heavy rainfall year-round.

Climate data for Bengkayang
Month	Jan	Feb	Mar	Apr	May	Jun	Jul	Aug	Sep	Oct	Nov	Dec	Year
Mean daily maximum °C (°F)	29.4 (84.9)	29.7 (85.5)	30.4 (86.7)	30.8 (87.4)	31.3 (88.3)	31.0 (87.8)	30.8 (87.4)	30.8 (87.4)	30.7 (87.3)	30.7 (87.3)	30.3 (86.5)	29.9 (85.8)	30.5 (86.9)
Daily mean °C (°F)	25.7 (78.3)	25.9 (78.6)	26.2 (79.2)	26.5 (79.7)	26.8 (80.2)	26.6 (79.9)	26.3 (79.3)	26.4 (79.5)	26.4 (79.5)	26.5 (79.7)	26.3 (79.3)	26.0 (78.8)	26.3 (79.3)
Mean daily minimum °C (°F)	22.0 (71.6)	22.2 (72.0)	22.1 (71.8)	22.3 (72.1)	22.4 (72.3)	22.2 (72.0)	21.9 (71.4)	22.0 (71.6)	22.2 (72.0)	22.4 (72.3)	22.3 (72.1)	22.2 (72.0)	22.2 (71.9)
Average rainfall mm (inches)	307 (12.1)	237 (9.3)	243 (9.6)	268 (10.6)	240 (9.4)	172 (6.8)	142 (5.6)	190 (7.5)	211 (8.3)	307 (12.1)	331 (13.0)	325 (12.8)	2,973 (117.1)
Source: Climate-Data.org

== Notable people ==
- Prajogo Pangestu (born 1944), business magnate, investor, philanthropist and billionaire; currently the richest person in Southeast Asia
