= Sambas Regency =

Regency in West Kalimantan, Indonesia

Sambas Regency Kabupaten Sambas
- Regency
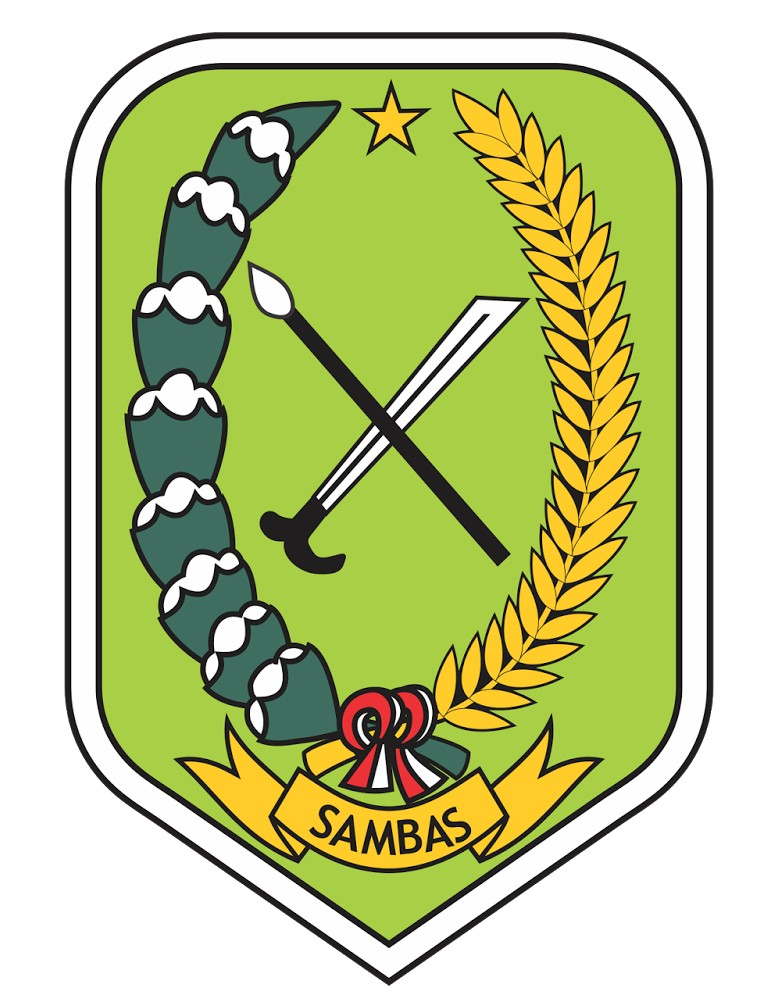
- Coat of arms

- Location within West Kalimantan

- Location in Kalimantan and Indonesia Sambas Regency (Indonesia)
- Coordinates: 1.4167°N 109.3333°E
- Country: Indonesia
- Province: West Kalimantan
- Capital: Sambas

Government
  - Regent: Satono
  - Vice Regent: Heroaldi Djuhardi Alwi

Area
  - Total: 5,938.48 km^{2} (2,292.86 sq mi)

Population (mid 2025 estimate)
  - Total: 661,452
  - Density: 111.384/km^{2} (288.483/sq mi)
- Time zone: UTC+7 (IWST)
- Area code: (+62)
- Website: sambas.go.id

Sambas Regency is the most northerly regency in West Kalimantan Province of Indonesia. The regency is one of the original regencies in West Kalimantan, but on 20 April 1999 the southern districts were removed from Sambas Regency to form a new Bengkayang Regency (then including the town of Singkawang). The residual regency now covers 5,938.48 km^{2}, and had a population of 496,120 at the 2010 census and 629,905 at the 2020 census; the official estimate as at mid 2025 was 661,452 (comprising 336,918 males and 324,534 females). The administrative centre is at the town of Sambas.

== History ==
The famous Sambas Treasure, a collection of 9th century Buddhist sculptures, was found near Sambas Town. It is now part of the British Museum's collection.

Sambas was also part of the Sultanate of Sambas until the Dutch occupied the area in 1819.

In the Sambas riots in 1999, Malays and Dayaks joined to massacre the Madurese during the conflict. Madurese were mutilated, raped, and killed by the Malays and Dayaks; 3,000 of them died in the massacres, with the Indonesian government doing little to stop the violence.

Following the establishment of Bengkayang Regency on 27 April 1999, the administrative centre of Sambas Regency was formally moved from Singkawang (now in the new regency) to Sambas (town) on 15 July.

== Adjoining regencies and city ==
North	Lundu, Kuching Division, Sarawak, Malaysia
South	Singkawang, Indonesia
West	Natuna Sea, Indonesia
East	Bengkayang Regency, Indonesia

== Population ==
At the 2010 census, Sambas Regency had a population of 496,120. According to the 2020 census this had grown to 629,905 people. By mid 2025, the population was estimated at 661,452 (consisting of 336,918 males and 324,534 females), with an average density of 111.38 people per km^{2}.

== Watershed ==
Sambas has three watersheds (with a total area of 516,200 ha): the Sambas watershed (258,700 ha), the Paloh watershed (64,375 ha), and the Sebangkau watershed (193,125 ha).

== Administrative districts ==
When Sambas Regency was originally created, it consisted of the ten districts of Bengkayang, Ledo, Pemangkat, Sambas, Samalantan, Sanggau Ledo, Singkawang, Sungai Raya, Seluas and Teluk Keramat. In 1956, a new district named Selakau was established by splitting off from the northern part of Singkawang District. In 1958, two new districts were cut out from Pemangkat District, namely Jawai (from the northern part) and Tebas (from the eastern part). In 1963, another two districts were established (Paloh District was split off from the northern part of Teluk Keramat District, and Sejangkung District was split off from the northeastern part of Sambas District). On 12 December 1981, when Singkawang became an administrative city within the regency, it was split into three separate districts, namely Roban, Pasiran and Tujuhbelas. On 17 June 1996, Sajingan Besar District was established by splitting off from the five villages of three different districts (two from Sejangkung, two from Teluk Keramat, and one from Paloh) and Jagoi Babang (from the northern part of Seluas district). After Bengkayang Regency was established in 1999, the southern districts (including the administrative city of Singkawang), became part of that newly-created regency.

In 2001, two new districts were established (Galing District was split off from the eastern part of Teluk Keramat District, and Subah District was split off from the southern part of Sambas District). In 2003, another two districts were established (Semparuk District was split off from the eastern part of Pemangkat District, and Tekarang District was split off from the northern part of Tebas District). In 2004, three new districts were established (Sebawi District and Sajad District were cut out from the western and eastern parts of Sambas District respectively, and South Jawai District was cut out from the southern part of Jawai District). In 2006, a new district named Tangaran was carved out from the western part of Teluk Keramat District. A year later, two more districts were established (Selakau Timur District was split off from the eastern part of Selakau District and Salatiga District was split off from the southern part of Pemangkat District).

Sambas Regency thus now consists of nineteen districts (kecamatan), tabulated below with their areas and their populations at the 2010 census and the 2020 census, and the official estimates as at mid 2025. The table also includes the locations of the district administrative centres, the number of administrative villages in each district (all classed as rural desa), and its post code.

Kode Wilayah	Name of District (kecamatan)	Year formed	Area in km^{2}	Pop'n census 2010	Pop'n census 2020	Pop'n estimate mid 2025	Admin centre	No. of villages	Post code
61.01.07	Selakau	1956 (from Singkawang)	96.05	30,072	37,811	39,502	Sungai Nyirih	11	79452
61.01.19	Selakau Timur (East Selakau)	2007 (from Selakau)	186.10	10,200	12,515	12,921	Selakau Tua	4	79451
61.01.05	Pemangkat	1958	97.05	44,589	53,248	54,259	Pemangkat Kota	8	79455
61.01.13	Semparuk	2003 (from Pemangkat)	71.97	23,765	30,176	31,676	Semparuk	5	79457
61.01.18	Salatiga	2007 (from Pemangkat)	66.82	14,671	18,315	19,068	Salatiga	5	79456
61.01.04	Tebas	1958	636.85	63,613	80,268	84,000	Tebas Kuala	23	79461
61.01.12	Tekarang	2003 (from Tebas)	68.71	13,293	17,541	18,759	Tekarang	7	79468
61.01.01	Sambas	1952	220.03	44,979	57,295	60,235	Sambas (town)	18	79460
61.01.10	Subah	2001 (from Sambas)	752.74	17,527	23,762	25,746	Balai Gemuruh	11	79417
61.01.15	Sebawi	2004 (from Sambas)	100.89	15,598	20,248	21,483	Sebawi	7	79464
61.01.14	Sajad	2004 (from Sambas)	116.58	9,936	13,641	14,870	Tengguli	4	79462
61.01.03	Jawai	1957	231.25	35,042	47,307	51,152	Sentebang	13	79454
61.01.16	Jawai Selatan (South Jawai)	2004 (from Jawai)	107.70	17,660	22,167	23,139	Matang Terap	9	79154
61.01.02	Teluk Keramat (Keramat Bay)	1952	403.96	58,675	74,182	77,706	Sekura	25	79469
61.01.11	Galing	2001 (from Teluk Keramat)	420.99	19,653	24,864	26,054	Galing	10	79453
61.01.17	Tangaran	2006 (from Teluk Keramat)	138.19	20,789	25,838	26,842	Simpang Empat	8	79465
61.01.06	Sejangkung	1963 (from Sambas)	528.23	22,318	27,538	28,508	Parit Raja	12	79463
61.01.09	Sajingan Besar (Great Sajingan)	1996 (from three districts)	1,037.06	9,848	13,286	14,361	Kaliau	5	79467
61.01.08	Paloh	1963 (from Teluk Keramat)	657.31	23,892	29,903	31,171	Liku	8	79466
	Totals		5,938.48	496,120	629,905	661,452	Sambas (town)	193	

== List of Sambas Regents and Vice Regents ==
Regent	Vice Regent	Took office	Last Office	Notice
R. Djenal Asikin Judadibrata		1950	1951	
Sudjana		1951	1952	
Raden Prayitno Tjokro Hadi Suryo		1952	1954	
Raden Abubakar Arya Diningrat		1954	1955	
Loemban Tobing		1955	1958	
Muhammad Zaini Noer		1958	1960	
Firdaus		1960	1967	
Muhammad Nurdin		1967	1973	
Soemardji		1973	1978	First Period
Soemardji		1978	1983	Second Period
Saksono		1983	1988	
Saidi A.S.		1988	1990	
Tamar Abdulsalam		1990	1991	
Syafei Djamil		1991	1996	
Tarya Aryanto		1996	2001	
Burhanuddin A. Rasyid	Prabasa Ananta Tur	2001	2006	First Period
Burhanuddin A. Rasyid	Djuliarti Djuhardi Alwi	2006	2011	Second Period
Djuliarti Djuhardi Alwi	Pabali Musa	2011	2016	
Atbah Romin Suhaili	Hairiah	2016	2021	
Satono	Fahrur Rofi	2021	present	
