= Japanese occupation of the Dutch East Indies =

1942–1945 occupation during World War II

Japanese-occupied Dutch East Indies 蘭印 Ran-in
- 1942–1945
- Flag Imperial Seal
- Motto: Hakkō ichiu (八紘一宇)
- Anthem: 君が代 ("Kimigayo") 'His Majesty's Reign' Indonesia Raya (unofficial) "Great Indonesia"
- The former Dutch East Indies (dark red) within the Empire of Japan (light red) at its furthest extent
- Status: Military occupation by the Empire of Japan
- Capital: Djakarta (Occupied Java); Bukittinggi (Occupied Sumatra; from 1943, previously in Singapore); Makassar (Occupied Borneo and Eastern Indonesia); Hollandia (Occupied New Guinea)
- Common languages: Japanese, Indonesian
- Emperor
  - 1942–1945: Hirohito
- Prime Minister
  - 1942–1944: Hideki Tojo
  - 1944–1945: Kuniaki Koiso
- Historical era: World War II, Pacific War
  - Occupation begins: 11 January 1942
  - First Battle of the Java Sea: 27 February 1942
  - Second Battle of the Java Sea: 1 March 1942
  - Dutch capitulation: 9 March 1942
  - Pontianak incidents (Pontianak massacres): 1943–1944
  - PETA insurgency: 14 February 1945
  - Surrender of Japan: 15 August 1945
  - Independence proclaimed: 17 August 1945
  - Disestablished: 12 September 1945
- Currency: Netherlands Indian roepiah
Preceded by
Dutch East Indies
Portuguese Timor
Succeeded by
Indonesia
Dutch East Indies
Portuguese Timor
- Today part of: Indonesia; East Timor

The Empire of Japan occupied the Dutch East Indies (now Indonesia) during World War II from March 1942 until after the end of the war in September 1945.

In May 1940, Germany occupied the Netherlands, and martial law was declared in the Dutch East Indies. Following the failure of negotiations between the Dutch authorities and the Japanese, Japanese assets in the archipelago were frozen. The Dutch declared war on Japan following the 7 December 1941 attack on Pearl Harbor. The Japanese invasion of the Dutch East Indies began on 10 January 1942, and the Imperial Japanese Army overran the entire colony in less than three months. The Dutch surrendered on 8 March. Initially, most Indonesians welcomed the Japanese as liberators from their Dutch colonial masters. The sentiment changed, however, as between 4 and 10 million Indonesians were recruited as forced labourers (rōmusha) on economic development and defence projects in Java. Between 200,000 and 500,000 were sent away from Java to the outer islands, and as far as Burma and Siam. Of those taken off Java, not more than 70,000 survived the war. Four million people died in the Dutch East Indies as a result of famine and forced labour during the Japanese occupation, including 30,000 European civilian internee deaths.

In 1944–1945, Allied troops largely bypassed the Dutch East Indies and did not fight their way into the most populous parts such as Java and Sumatra. As such, most of the Dutch East Indies was still under occupation at the time of Japan's surrender in August 1945.

The invasion and subsequent occupation formed a fundamental challenge to Dutch colonial rule and brought about changes so extensive that the subsequent Indonesian National Revolution became possible. However, the Indonesian independence movement initially lacked international recognition, and following the surrender the Netherlands regained control of most of the Indies. A bitter five-year diplomatic, military and social struggle ensued, resulting in the Netherlands recognising Indonesian sovereignty in December 1949.

== Background ==
After the Meiji Restoration of 1868, the Nanshin-ron policy focused on southeast Asia and Pacific Islands as Japan's sphere of influence and as objects for trade and emigration. During the early Meiji period, Japan derived economic benefits from Japanese emigrants to Southeast Asia, among whom there were prostitutes (Karayuki-san) who worked in brothels in the Dutch East Indies and other western colonies in Southeast Asia.

Until 1942, what is now Indonesia was a colony of the Netherlands and was known as the Dutch East Indies. In 1929, during the Indonesian National Awakening, Indonesian nationalist leaders Sukarno and Mohammad Hatta (later founding president and vice president, respectively), foresaw the Pacific War and that a Japanese advance on the Dutch East Indies might be advantageous for the independence cause.

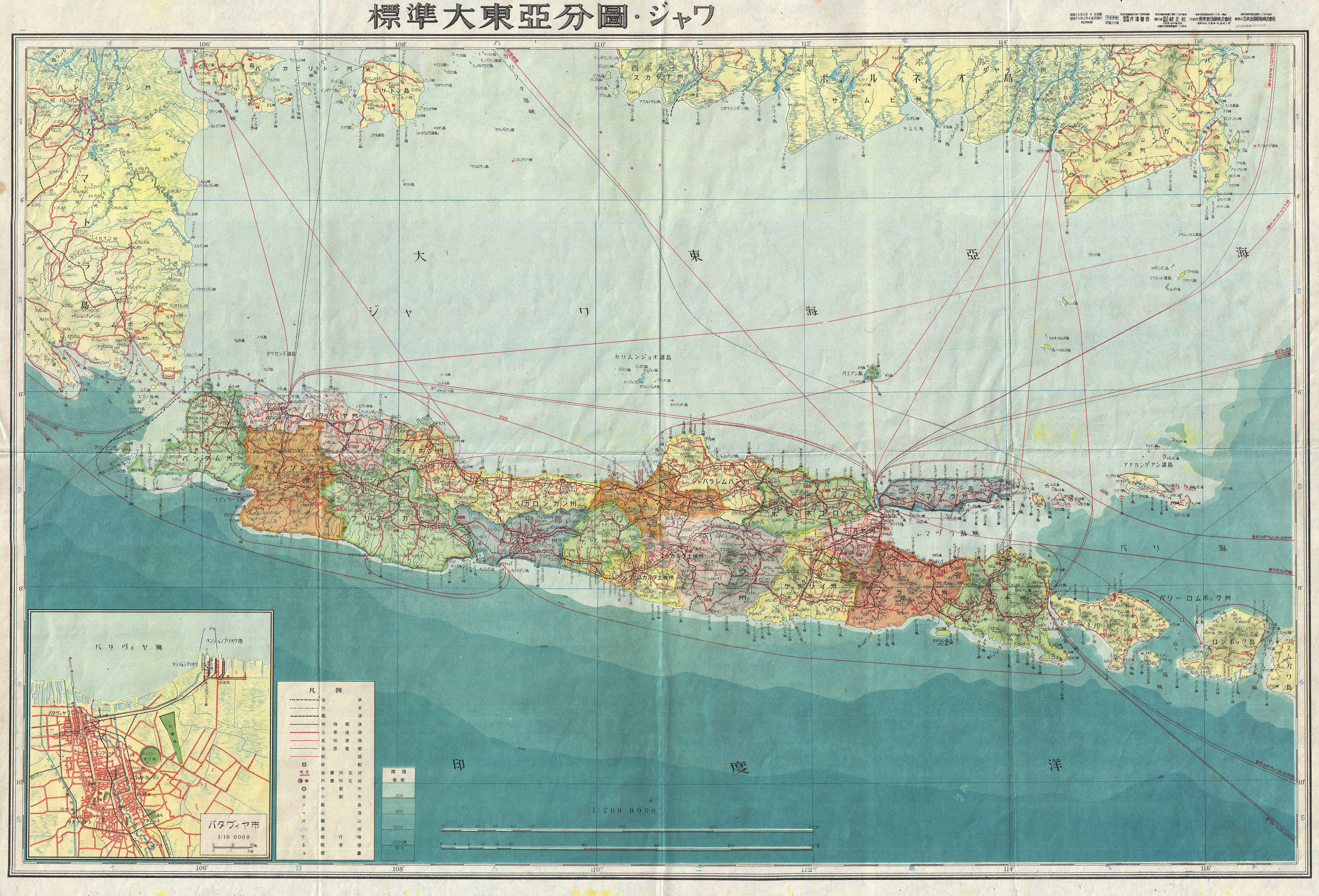
Map prepared by the Japanese during World War II, depicting Java, the most populous island in the Dutch East Indies

The Japanese spread the word that they were the "Light of Asia". Japan was the only Asian nation that had successfully transformed itself into a modern technological society by the end of the 19th century. It had remained independent when most Asian countries had been under European or American control, and had beaten a European power, Russia, in war. Following its military campaign in China, Japan turned its attention to Southeast Asia, advocating to other Asians a Greater East Asia Co-Prosperity Sphere, which they described as a type of trade zone under Japanese leadership. The Japanese had gradually spread their influence throughout Asia in the first half of the 20th century, and during the 1920s and 1930s had established business links to the Indies. These ranged from small town barbers, photographic studios and salesmen, to large department stores and firms such as Suzuki and Mitsubishi becoming involved in the sugar trade.

The Japanese population in Indonesia peaked in 1931 at 6,949 residents before starting a gradual decrease, largely as a result of economic tensions between Japan and the Dutch East Indies government. Many Japanese had been sent by their government to establish links with Indonesian nationalists, particularly with Muslim parties, while Indonesian nationalists were sponsored to visit Japan. Such encouragement of Indonesian nationalism was part of a broader Japanese plan for an "Asia for the Asians". While most Indonesians were hopeful for the Japanese promise of an end to the racially based Dutch system, Chinese Indonesians, who enjoyed a privileged position under Dutch rule, were less optimistic. In the late 1930s, Japanese aggression in Manchuria and China caused anxiety amongst the Chinese in Indonesia, who set up funds to support the anti-Japanese effort. Dutch intelligence services also monitored Japanese living in Indonesia.

In November 1941, the Madjlis Rakjat Indonesia (the Indonesian People's Assembly), an Indonesian organisation of religious, political, and trade union groups, submitted a memorandum to the Dutch East Indies government requesting the mobilisation of the Indonesian people in the face of the war threat. The memorandum was rejected because the government did not consider Madjlis Rakyat Indonesia to be representative of the people. Less than four months later, the Japanese had occupied the archipelago.

== Invasion ==
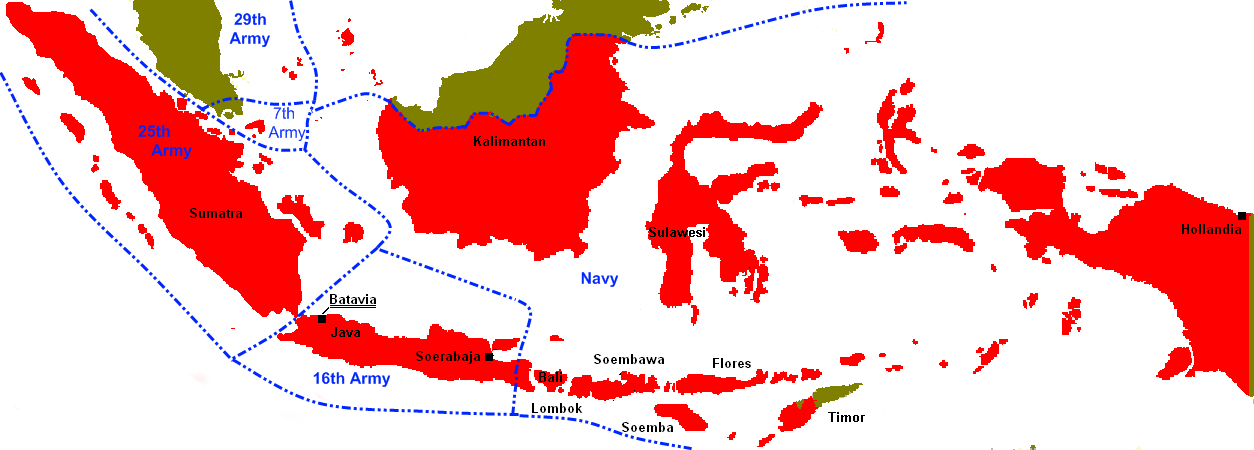
Map of the Japanese administrative areas after April 1943

On 8 December 1941, the Dutch government-in-exile declared war on Japan. In January 1942 the American-British-Dutch-Australian Command was formed to co-ordinate Allied forces in Southeast Asia, under the command of General Archibald Wavell. In the weeks leading up to the invasion, senior Dutch government officials went into exile, taking political prisoners, family, and personal staff to Australia. Before the arrival of Japanese troops, there were conflicts between rival Indonesian groups where people were killed, vanished or went into hiding. Chinese-owned and Dutch-owned properties were ransacked and destroyed.

The invasion in early 1942 was swift and complete. By January 1942, parts of Sulawesi and Kalimantan were under Japanese control. By February, the Japanese had landed on Sumatra where they had encouraged the Acehnese to rebel against the Dutch. On 19 February, having already taken Ambon, the Japanese Eastern Task Force landed in Timor, dropping a special parachute unit into West Timor near Kupang, and landing in the Dili area of Portuguese Timor to drive out the Allied forces which had invaded in December.

On 27 February, the Allied navy's last effort to contain Japan was swept aside by their defeat in the Battle of the Java Sea. From 28 February to 1 March 1942, Japanese troops landed on four places along the northern coast of Java almost undisturbed. The fiercest fighting had been in invasion points in Ambon, Timor, Kalimantan, and on the Java Sea. In places where there were no Dutch troops, such as Bali, there was no fighting. On 8 March, Japanese soldiers seized the NIROM radio station in Batavia and ordered broadcasts to continue. The radio employees defiantly played Wilhelmus which resulted in the Japanese executing 3 of them. On 9 March, the Dutch commander surrendered along with Governor General Jonkheer A.W.L. Tjarda van Starkenborgh Stachouwer.

The Japanese occupation was initially greeted with optimistic enthusiasm by Indonesians who came to meet the Japanese army waving flags and shouting support such as "Japan is our older brother" and "banzai Dai Nippon". As the Japanese advanced, rebellious Indonesians in virtually every part of the archipelago killed groups of Europeans (particularly the Dutch) and informed the Japanese reliably on the whereabouts of larger groups. As famed Indonesian writer Pramoedya Ananta Toer noted: "With the arrival of the Japanese just about everyone was full of hope, except for those who had worked in the service of the Dutch."

== Japanese administration ==
Expecting that Dutch administrators would be kept by the Japanese to run the colony, most Dutch had refused to leave. Instead, they were sent to detention camps and Japanese or Indonesian replacements were installed in senior and technical positions. Japanese troops took control of government infrastructure and services including ports and postal services. In addition to the 100,000 European (and some Chinese) civilians interned, 80,000 Dutch, British, Australian, and US Allied troops went to prisoner-of-war camps where the death rates were between 13 and 30 percent. The Indonesian ruling class (composed of local officials and politicians who had formerly worked for the Dutch colonial government) co-operated with the Japanese military authorities, who in turn helped to keep the local political elites in power and employ them to supply newly arrived Japanese industrial concerns and businesses and the armed forces (chiefly auxiliary military and police units run by the Japanese military in the Dutch East Indies). Indonesian co-operation allowed the Japanese military government to focus on securing the large archipelago's waterways and skies and using its islands as defense posts against any Allied attacks (which were assumed to most likely come from Australia).

The Japanese military administration in the Dutch East Indies implemented a series of policies and guidelines for governance, as outlined in Southern Occupied Territories Administrative Guidelines.

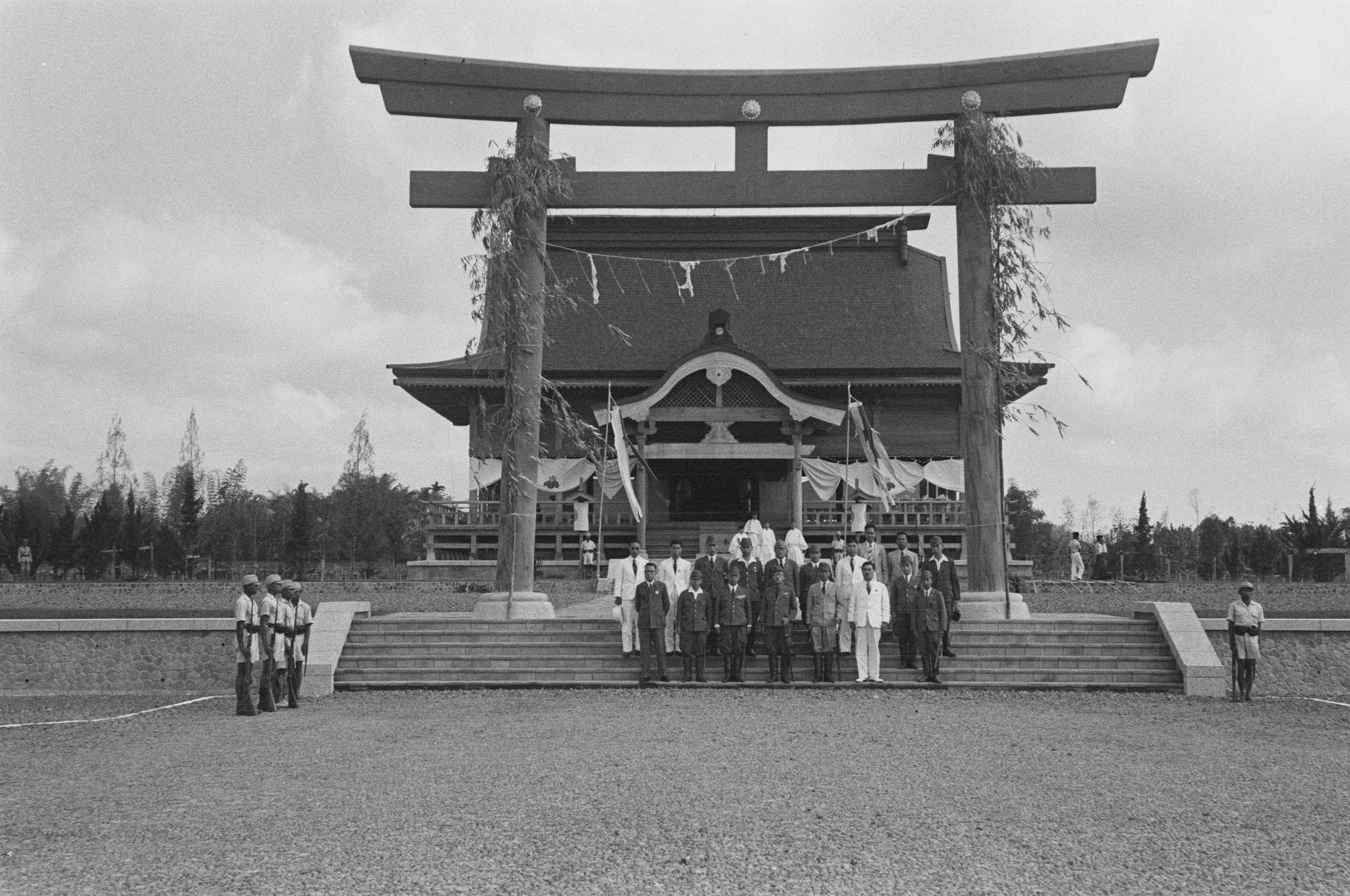
Ching Nan Shrine in Malang, East Java. One out of 11 Shinto shrines built in Indonesia.

The Japanese divided Indonesia into three separate regions; Sumatra (along with Malaya) was placed under the 25th Army, Java and Madura were under the 16th Army, while Borneo and eastern Indonesia were controlled by the 2nd South Fleet of the Imperial Japanese Navy (IJN) based in Makassar. The 16th Army was headquartered in Jakarta and the 25th Army was based in Singapore until 1 May 1943, when its command was narrowed to just Sumatra and the headquarters moved to Bukittinggi to ensure the island had military self-sufficiency in the even of an Allied attack.

=== Japanese administration in Java under the 16th Army ===
In Java, the 16th Army had planned to manage Java as a single entity. However the army had not brought enough administration experts to set up a separate body. A large number of Japanese residents in Java, who could have advised the occupiers, were taken to Australia at the outbreak of war, while a group of civilian administrators were killed in the Battle of the Java Sea. Problems were compounded by the fact that very few Indonesians spoke Japanese. In August 1942, the administration was formally separated from the army command. The military government structure consisted of three positions, namely Gunshirekan, Gunseikan, and Gunseibu. The personnel was similar to the structure of 16th Army.

- Army Commander (gunshireikan (軍司令官; commonly Romanized as gunshirekan in Indonesia)) who was also called Supreme Commander (saikou shikikan (最高指揮官) sometimes Romanized as Seiko Shikikan in Indonesia), was the supreme commander and highest leader. The first army commander was General Hitoshi Imamura, continued with Kumakichi Harada, Moichiro Yamamoto (acting), and Yuichiro Nagano.
- The head of the military government (gunseikan (軍政官) was also the chief of staff. The first chief of staff to serve was Major General Seizaburo Okasaki, then Kokubun Shinshichiro, and lastly Moichiro Yamamoto, who also became acting Gunshirekan. His deputy headed the most important section of the administration, the Department of General Affairs (Japanese: 総務部, romanized: sōmubu), which acted as a secretariat and issued policies. Other than this department there were 9 other departments.
- Gunseibu (軍政部) was a government coordinator tasked with restoring order and security, or a kind of governor. There were five Gunseibu, representing West Java, Central Java, East Java, Kochi Surakarta, and Kochi Yogyakarta. Hence while the Japanese formally abolished the three provinces and the two governorates, it never disappeared.

The local government structure in Java was as follows:

- Shū (州) or romanized in Indonesian as Syuu, or the former residencies. The Kanji used mean the provinces, similar to the Provinces of Japan even though it is translated as prefectures. This would formally become the highest government level following the formal abolishment of the provinces and governorates. There were 17 Syuu formalized by Law 28/1942 since August 7, 1942. It has no modern Indonesian equivalent, as it was abolished in 1963 by Regulation of the President of the Republic of Indonesia No. 22 Tahun 1963.
- Shi or Syi (市) and Ken (県), represented the former Dutch Stadsgemeente or municipality, and the regencies respectively. The literal meaning of the kanjis used mean cities and prefecture respectively. Its modern equivalents are City and Regency.
- Gun (郡), represented the former Dutch district kewedanaan, similar to the Districts of Japan. Its modern equivalent was also abolished in 1963 by the same regulation as the residency.
- Son (村), represented the former Dutch onderdistrict (subdistrict), similar to Japanese villages even though it would be the modern equivalent of districts of Indonesia.
- Ku (区), represented the former pseudo-level of villages, which during the Dutch era was functioning despite its not a formal administrative division. It was the first time the villages were part of official administrative hierarchy, and would be inherited by the Republic of Indonesia as villages

Informal:

- Azajōkai or Azazyookai (字常会) represented the modern rukun warga. It was not an official administrative division but a grouping of territorial neighborhood associations.
- Tonarigumi (隣組) represented the modern rukun tetangga. It was not an official administrative division but a territorial neighborhood association.

=== Japanese administration in Sumatra under the 25th Army ===
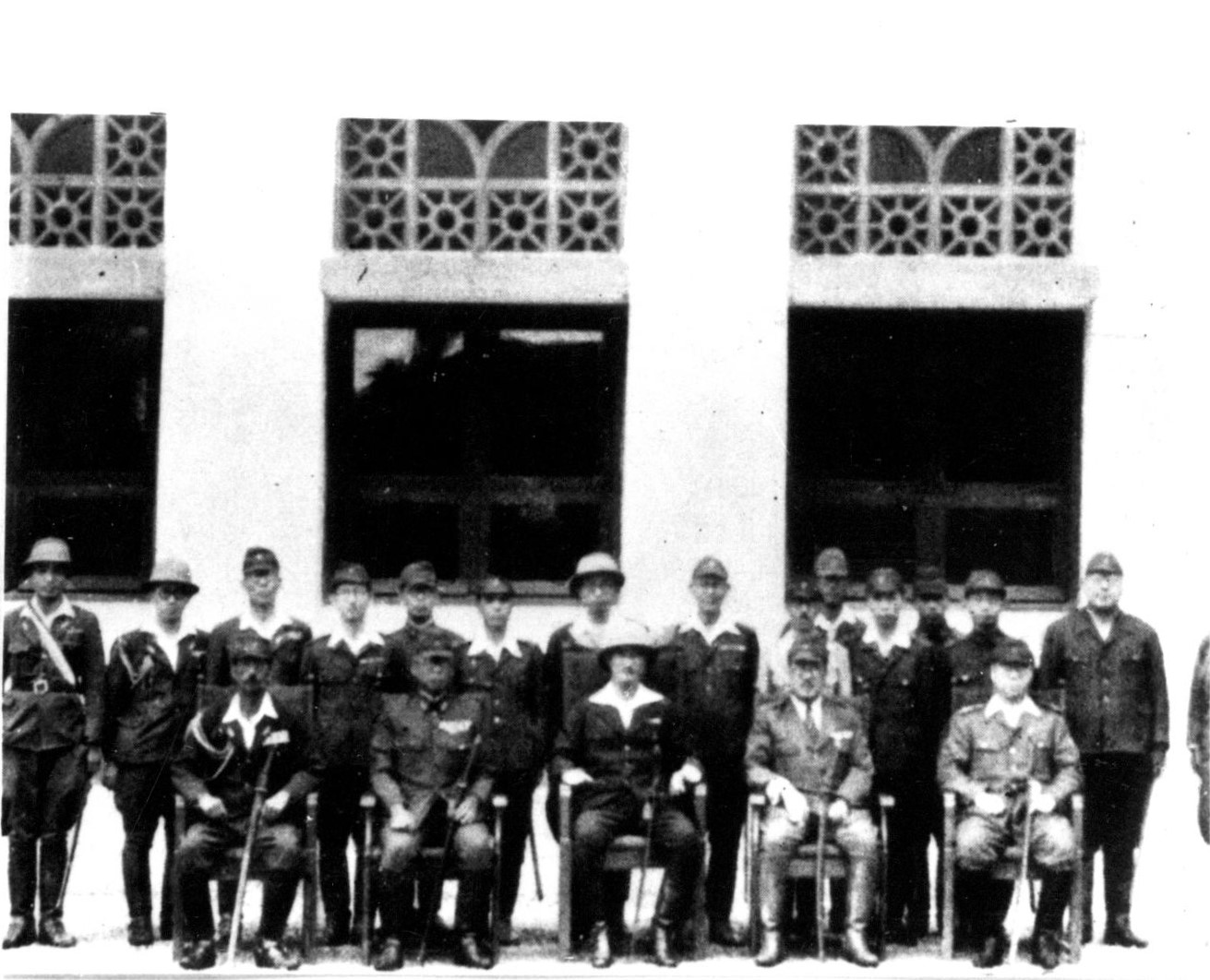
Occupation government of West Sumatra run by the 25th Army. (Left to right: Staff officer Nishiooeda, Field Marshal Hisaichi Terauchi, General Moritake Tanabe, and Governor Yano Kenzo.)

In Sumatra, the 25th Army had the same structure. The first Gunshirekan was Tomoyuki Yamashita. The division however was as follows:

Held by Japanese:

- Shū (州), the former residencies. There were 10 in Sumatra, the same as during the Dutch era.
- Shi (市) and Bunshū (分周) which respectively represented the former Dutch Stadsgemeente and the former afdeeling. Led by Shichō (市長) and Bunshūchō (分周長) who occasionally also acted as the chief of police (keimu-buchō (警務部長). There were 6 Shi and 26 Bunshū, three less Shi and one less Bunshū than the Dutch era as the Shi were merged back to the surrounding Bunshū and the Riau islands fell under the jurisdiction of Singapore.

Held by Native Indonesians

- Fukubunshū (副分周) in some Shū, like Aceh, East Sumatra, West Sumatra, and Palembang, equivalent with onderafdeeling led by a kantokukan which was equivalent to controleur.
- Gun (郡), represented the Sumatran landschap which was equivalent to onderdistrict/asisten kewedanaan in Java
- Fukugun (副郡), a new grouping of several villages, actually more similar to the Javanese Son
- Son (村), represented the former pseudo-level of villages

=== Japanese administration in other islands under the Japanese Navy ===
In the region controlled by the navy, the plan was to turn to area into a permanent colony administered by civilian Japanese bureaucrats, but still subordinate to the navy. Therefore, the IJN brought administrators with them.

Initially the military administration of Minami Borneo or the Dutch Borneo fell under the jurisdiction of the Southwest Area Fleet led by a commander-in-chief, who in turn, appointed a superintendent-general or chief civil administrator or Japanese: 総官, romanized: sōkan for civil government. The sōkan oversaw the Naval Civil Administration Office (Japanese: 民政府, romanized: minseifu) established in Makassar.

Japanese held:

- Shū (州), the former Residency, when a Residency coincided with the seat of a Minseibu, such as residentie Zuider-en-Oosterafdeeling van Borneo with Banjarmasin as its capital, it became a "Direct Rule Area" under the Minseibu, in this case, the Borneo Minseibu.
- Bunken (分遣, area) represented the Dutch Afdeeling.

Native held:

- Gun (郡) or district, a new grouping of the former onderdistrict
- Fukugun (副郡), represented the outer islands landschap which was equivalent to onderdistrict/asisten kewedanaan in Java.
- Son (村) or Kampung (village), the former pseudo-level of villages

== Treatment of the Indonesian population ==
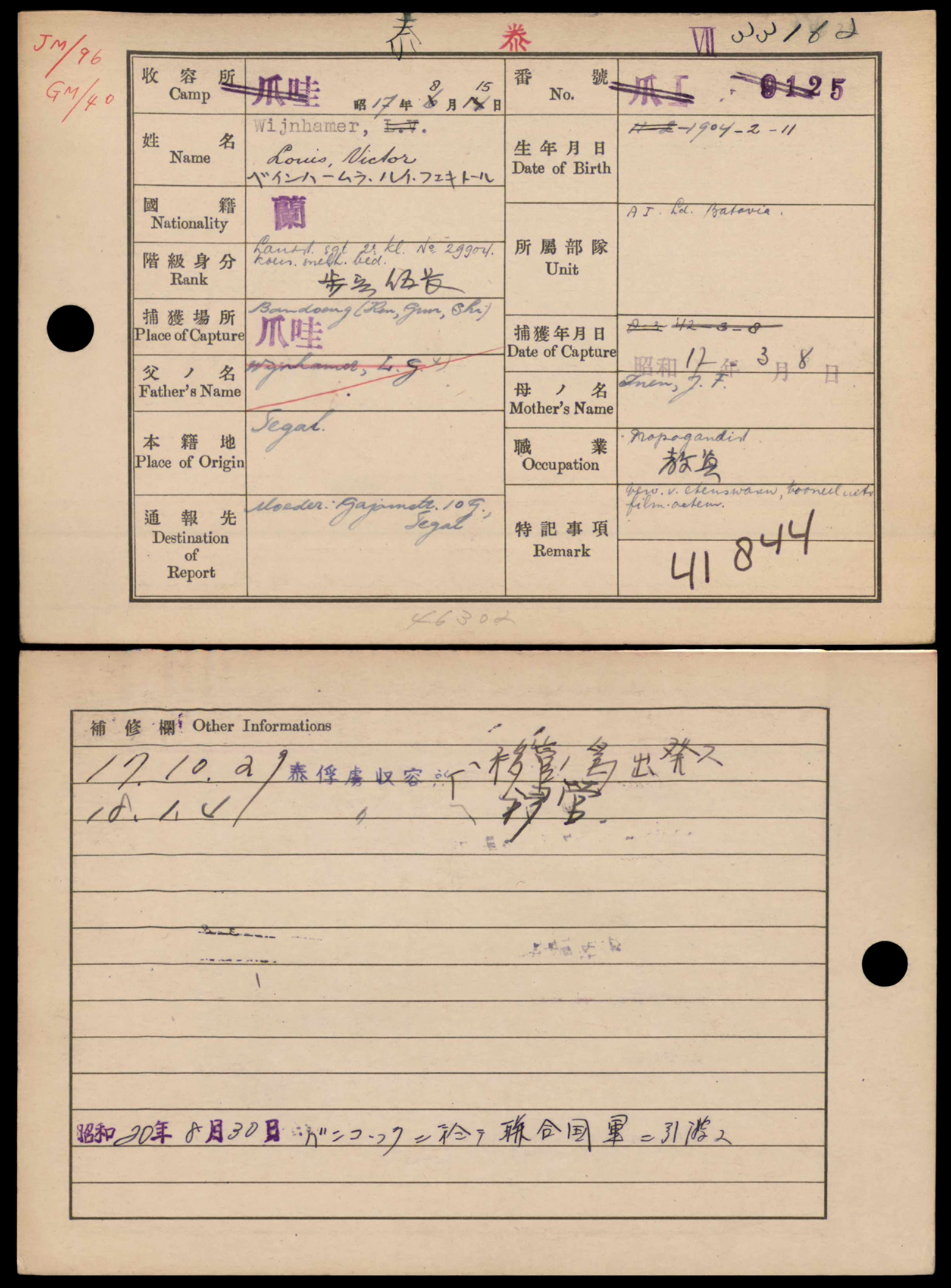
Japanese identity card issued to Louis Victor Wijnhamer, Jr., a local Indo-European man, during the occupation.

Experience of the occupation varied considerably, depending upon location and social position. Many who lived in areas considered important to the war effort experienced torture, sex slavery, arbitrary arrest and execution, and other war crimes. Thousands of people were taken away from Indonesia as forced labourers (romusha) for Japanese military projects, including the Burma-Siam and Saketi-Bayah railways, and suffered or died as a result of ill-treatment and starvation. Between 200,000 and 500,000 romusha recruited from Java were forced to work by the Japanese military.

Tens of thousands of Indonesians starved, worked as slave labourers, or were forced from their homes. In the National Revolution that followed, tens, even hundreds, of thousands, would die in fighting against the Japanese, Allied forces, and other Indonesians, before independence was achieved. A later United Nations report stated that 4,000,000 people died in Indonesia as a result of famine and forced labour during the Japanese occupation, including 30,000 European soldiers and European civilian internee deaths. A Dutch government study describing how the Japanese military recruited women as prostitutes by force in Indonesia concluded that among the 200 to 300 European women working in the Japanese military brothels, "some sixty five were most certainly forced into prostitution." Other young women (and their families), faced with various pressures in the internment camps or in wartime society, agreed to offers of work, the nature of which was frequently not explicitly stated.

=== War crimes ===
The Japanese brought Indonesian Javanese girls to British Borneo as comfort women to be raped by Japanese officers at the Ridge road school and Basel Mission Church, and the Telecommunication Center Station (former rectory of the All Saints Church) in Kota Kinabalu as well as ones in Balikpapan and Beaufort. Japanese soldiers raped Indonesian women and Dutch women in the Netherlands East Indies. Many of the women were infected with STDs as a result. Sukarno prostituted Indonesian girls from ethnic groups like Minangkabau to the Japanese. The Japanese destroyed many documents related to their rape of Indonesian Javanese girls at the end of the war so the true extent of the mass rape is uncountable, but testimony witnesses records the names and accounts of Indonesian Javanese comfort women.

The Japanese, in one instance, tried to disguise the Javanese comfort girls they were raping as red cross nurses with red cross armbands when they surrendered to Australian soldiers in Kupang, Timor.

In addition to disguising the Java girls with Red Cross armbands some Dutch girls were also brought to Kupang and native girls from Kupang were also kidnapped by the Japanese while the native men were forced into hard labour.

Indian and Javanese captives in Biak were freed from Japanese control by Allied forces.

Only 70,000 Javanese survived out of 260,000 Javanese forced to labour on the death railway between Burma and Thailand.

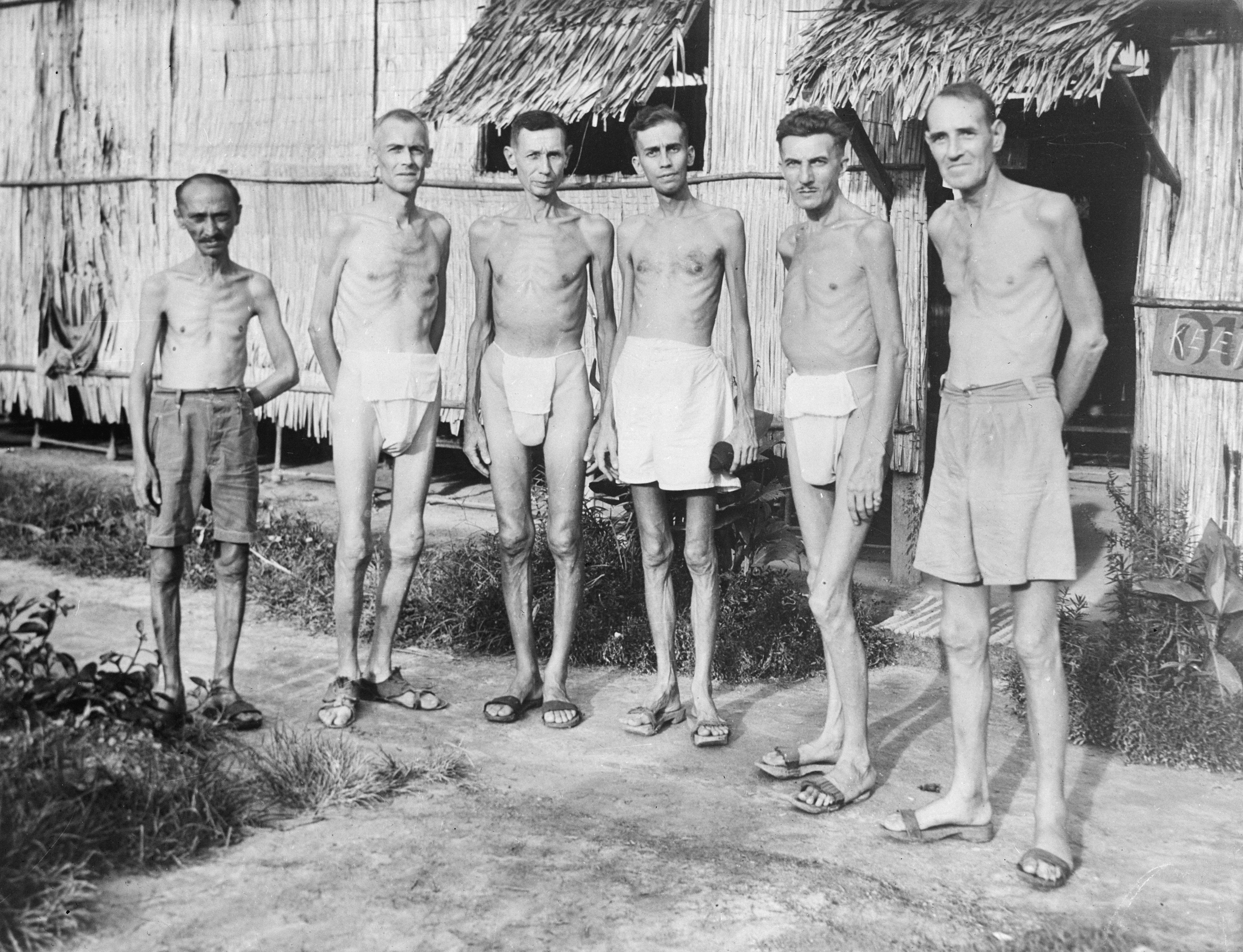
Liberated Dutch prisoners in 1945

In August 1945 the Japanese were getting ready to execute female European internees by shooting in the Dutch East Indies and their plans were only stopped by the atomic bomb with the plans and list of detainees already written down.

Francis Stanley (Frank) Terry, an Australian sailor on a naval vessel participated in the repatriation of Indonesian Javanese comfort women from islands across Indonesia back to their home.

The Japanese forced Javanese women to work in brothels and Javanese men to become forced labour at airstrips in Labuan, Borneo. The Javanese men were worked to starvation, resembling skeletons, barely able to move and were sick with beri beri by the time they were freed in June 1945 by Australians. The Japanese reserved a house as a brothel and officer's club on Fox Road in Labuan.

On 28 August 1945 the British and Australians gave medical treatment to 300 Javanese and Malay male slaves of the Japanese who were malnourished and starving from forced labour.

Many Indonesian comfort women were reluctant to talk about their experiences due to shame. A 10 year old Indonesian girl named Niyem from Karamangmojo in Yogyakarta was repeatedly raped for 2 months by Japanese soldiers along with other Indonesian girls in West Java. She did not tell her parents what the Japanese did to her when she managed to flee.

The Japanese killed four million Indonesians. After the defeat of Japan, the Dutch generally did not care about Japanese rape of non-white, native Indonesian Muslim girls and most of the time they only charged Japanese war criminals for rape of white Dutch women.

As the Dutch implemented a war of attrition and scorch earth, they forced Chinese on Java to flee inland and the Dutch destroyed all important assets including Chinese factories and property. Local Indonesians joined in on the Dutch violence against the Chinese looting Chinese property and trying to attack Chinese. However, when the Japanese troops landed and seized control of Java from the Dutch, to people's surprise, the Japanese forced the native Indonesians to stop looting and attacking Chinese and warned the Indonesians they would not tolerate anti-Chinese violence in Java. The Japanese viewed the Chinese in Java and their economic power specifically as important and vital to Japanese war effort so they did not physically harm the Chinese of Java with no execution or torture of Chinese taking place unlike in other places. The Japanese also allowed Chinese of Java in the Federation of Overseas-Chinese Associations (Hua Chiao Tsung Hui) to form the Keibotai, their own armed Chinese defence corps for protection with Japanese military instructors training them how to shoot and use spears. The Chinese viewed this as important to defending themselves from local Indonesians. The majority of Chinese of Java did not die in the war. It was only after the war ended when Japanese control fell and then the native Indonesians again started attacks against the Chinese of Java when the Japanese were unable to protect them.

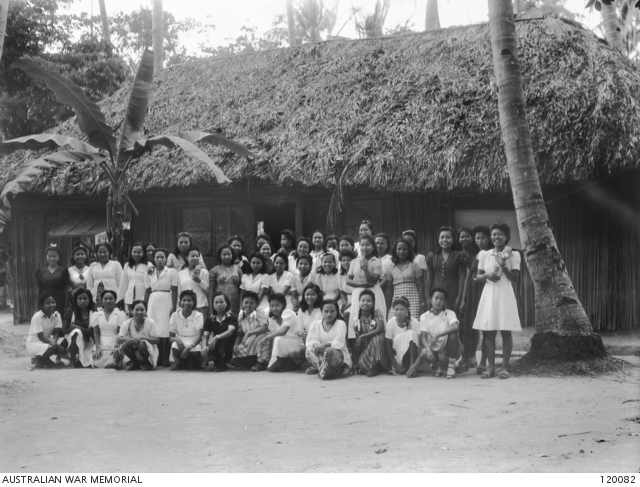
Javanese girls liberated by Australian troops from a Japanese brothel in Koepang, Timor, 2 October 1945

In Java, the Japanese heavily recruited Javanese girls as comfort women and brought them to New Guinea, Malaysia, Thailand and other areas foreign to Indonesia besides using them in Java itself. The Japanese brought Javanese women as comfort women to Buru island, and Kalimantan. The Japanese recruited help from local collaborator police of all ethnicities to recruit Javanese girls, with one account accusing Chinese recruiters of tricking a Javanese regent into sending good Javanese girls into prostitution for the Japanese in May 1942. The Japanese also lied to the Javanese telling them that their girls would become waitresses and actresses when recruiting them. The Japanese brought Javanese women as comfort women prostitutes to Kupang in Timor while in East Timor the Japanese took local women in Dili. In Bali, the Japanese sexually harassed Balinese women when they came and started forcing Balinese women into brothels for prostitution, with Balinese men and Chinese men used as recruiters for the Balinese women. All of the brothels in Bali were staffed by Balinese women. In brothels in Kalimantan, native Indonesian women made up 80% of the prostitutes. Javanese girls and local girls were used in a Japanese brothel in Ambon in Batu Gantung. European Dutch women were overrepresented in documents on Dutch East Indies comfort women which didn't reflect the actual reality because the Dutch did not care about native Indonesian women being victimised by Japan, refusing to prosecute cases against them since Indonesia was not a UN member at the time. Javanese comfort women who were taken by Japanese to islands outside Java were treated differently depending on whether they stayed on those islands or returned to Java. Since Javanese society was sexually permissive and they kept it secret from other Javanese, the Javanese women who returned to Java fared better, but the Javanese women who stayed on the islands like Buru were treated harsher by their hosts since they locals in Buru were more patriarchal. The Japanese murdered Christians and forced girls into prostitution in Timor and Sumba, desecrating sacred vessels and vestments in churches and using the churches as brothels. Javanese girls were brought as prostitutes by the Japanese to Flores and Buru. Eurasians, Indians, Chinese, Dutch, Menadonese, Bataks, Bugis, Dayaks, Javanese, Arabs and Malays were arrested and massacred in the Mandor affair.

Indonesian leader Suharto silenced public discussion in Indonesian on Japanese war crimes in Indonesia in order to stop anti-Japanese sentiment building up but it happened regardless when the film Romusha came out in 1973 and the Peristiwa Malari (Malari incident) riots broke out in Indonesia in 1974 against Japan. Suharto also sought to silence discussion on Japanese war crimes due to Indonesia's own war crimes in East Timor after 1975, but Indonesians started talking about Indonesian comfort women in the 1990s following the example of Korea. Mardyiem, a Javanese Indonesian comfort woman talked about what happened to her after Indonesian comfort women were interviewed by Japanese lawyers, after decades of being forced to stay silent.

Three major revolts happened against Japan by Indonesians in Java. Japanese forced Indonesians of West Java in Cirebon to hand over a massive quota of rice to the Japanese military with Japanese officers using brutality to extract even more than the official quota. The Indonesians in Cirebon rebelled twice and targeted Indonesian collaborator bureaucrats and Japanese officers in 1944. Japanese forces killed many Indonesian rebels and crushed revolts with deadly force. In Sukmana, Singapurna, the Tasikmalaya regency, the conservative religious teacher Kiai Zainal Mustafa told his followers that in the month when Muhammad was born they would gain divine protection when he gave a sign. In February 1943, Japanese Kempeitai caught wind of what was happening and came to the area but the roads were blocked to stop them. The Indonesian villagers and students began to fight the Japanese and seized the sabre of the Japanese chief to kill him. More Japanese arrived and 86 Japanese and 153 Indonesian villagers died in the fighting. The Japanese then arrested Zainal and 22 others for execution. Supriyadi lead a PETA mutiny against the Japanese in February 1945.

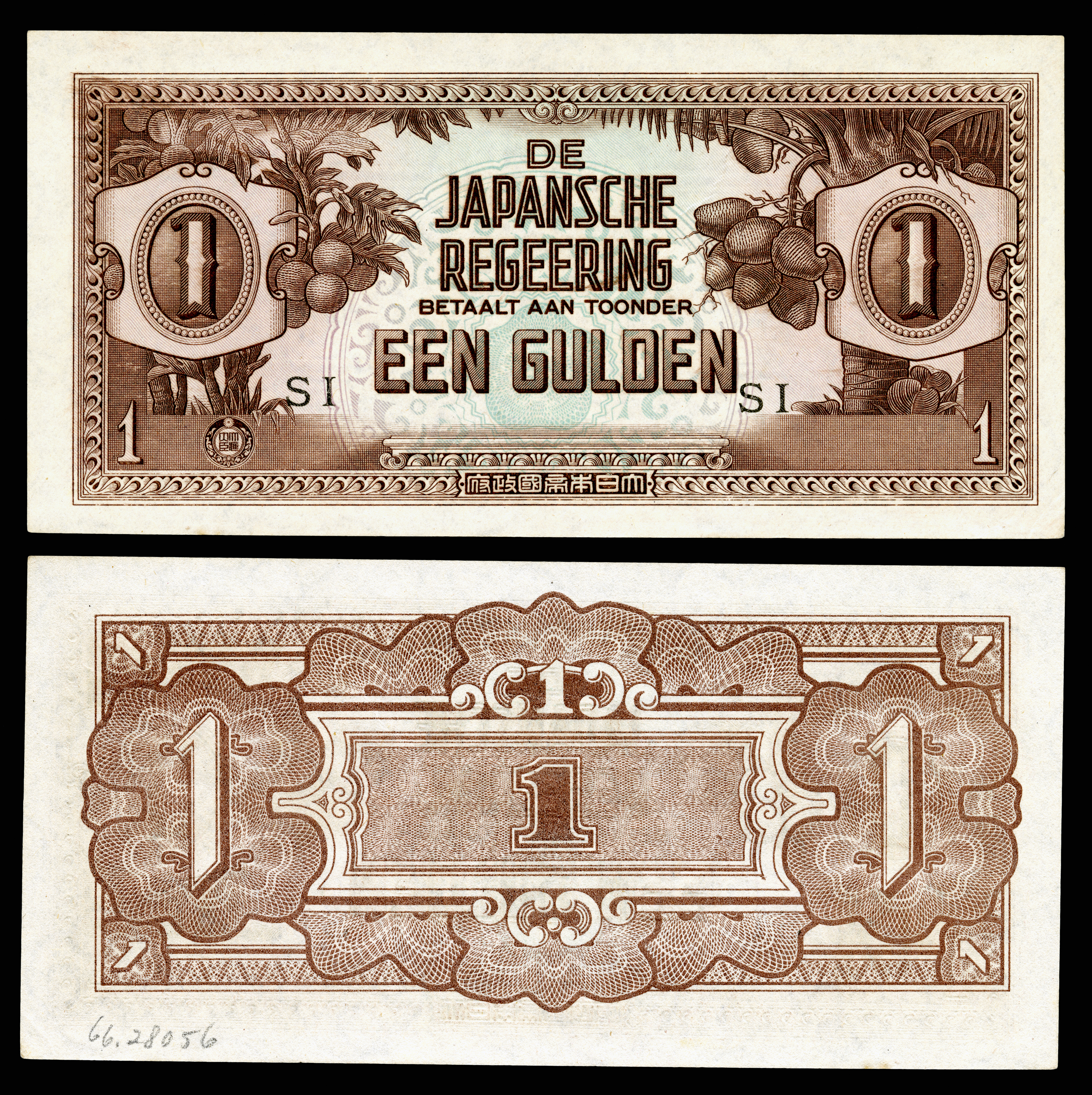
Netherlands Indian Gulden – the Japanese occupation currency

=== Underground resistance ===
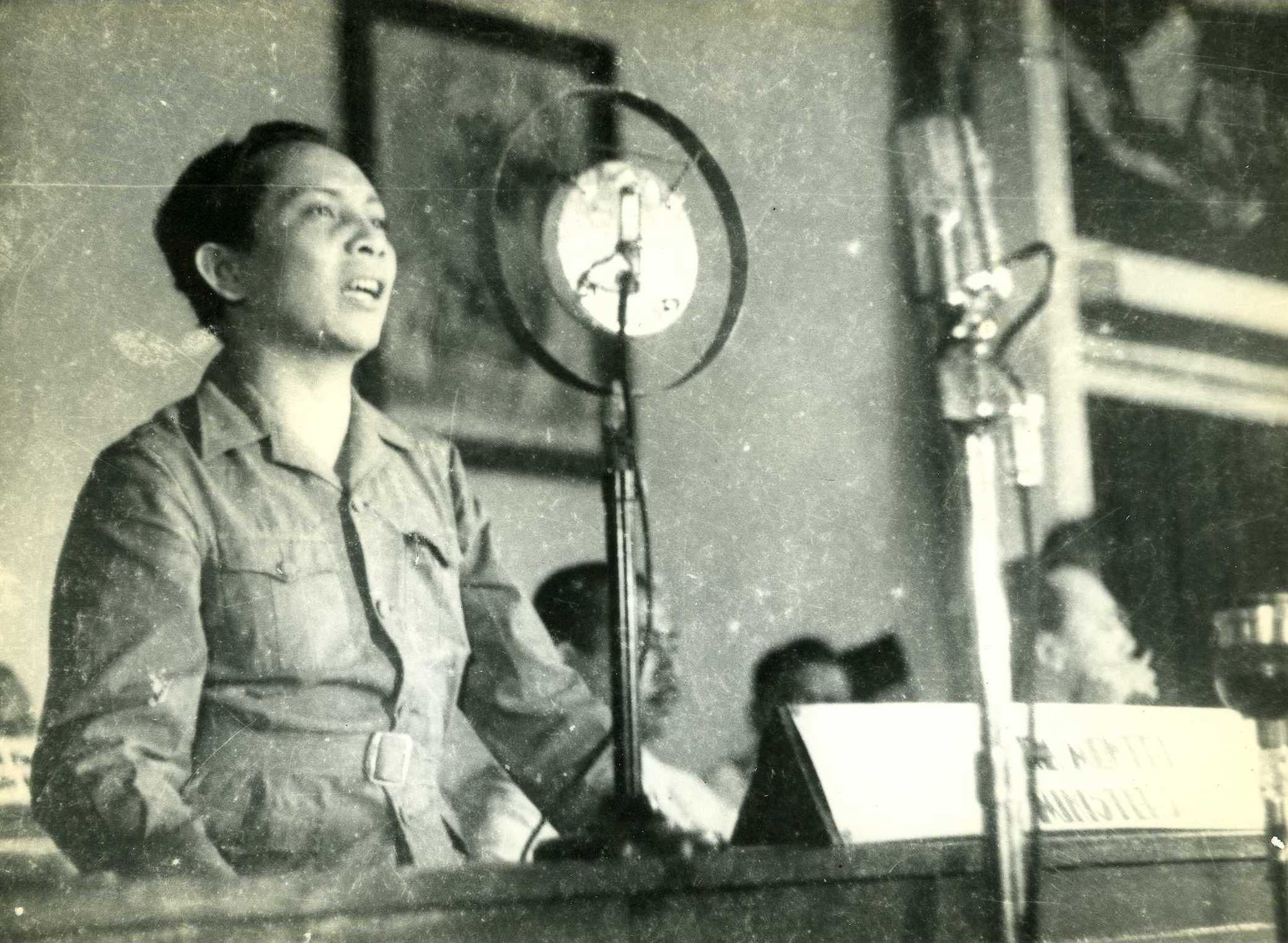
Sjahrir in 1947 in Malang.

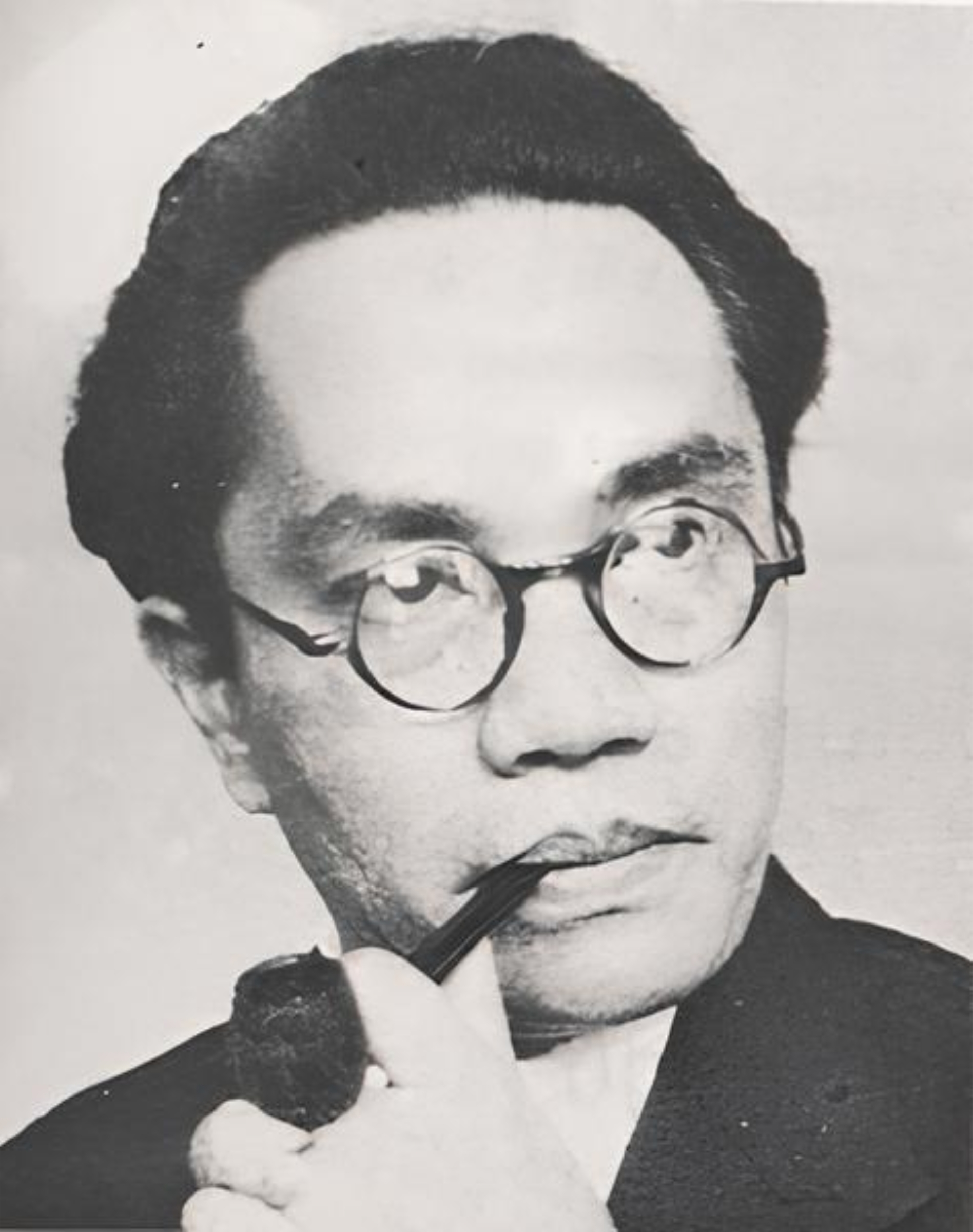
Indonesian nationalist Amir Sjarifuddin organized an underground resistance against the Japanese occupation.

Next to Sutan Sjahrir who led the student (Pemuda) underground, the only prominent opposition politician was leftist Amir Sjarifuddin who was given 25,000 guilders by the Dutch in early 1942 to organize an underground resistance through his Marxist and nationalist connections. The Japanese arrested Amir in 1943, and he only escaped execution following intervention from Sukarno, whose popularity in Indonesia and hence the importance to the war effort was recognized by the Japanese. Apart from Amir's Surabaya-based group, the active pro-Allied activities were among the Chinese, Ambonese, and Minahasans.

In September 1943 at Amuntai in south Kalimantan there was an attempt to establish an Islamic state, but this was soundly defeated. In the 1943–1944 Pontianak incidents (also known as the Mandor Affair), the Japanese orchestrated a mass arrest of Malay elites and Arabs, Chinese, Javanese, Manadonese, Dayaks, Bugis, Bataks, Minangkabau, Dutch, Indians, and Eurasians in Kalimantan, including all of the Malay Sultans, accused them of plotting to overthrow Japanese rule, and then massacred them. The Japanese falsely claimed that all of those ethnic groups and organisations such as the Islamic Pemuda Muhammadijah were involved in a plot to overthrow the Japanese and create a "People's Republic of West Borneo" (Negara Rakyat Borneo Barat). The Japanese claimed "Sultans, Chinese, Indonesian government officials, Indians and Arabs, who had been antagonistic to each other, joined to massacre Japanese", naming the Sultan of the Pontianak Sultanate as one of the "ringleaders" in the planned rebellion. Up to 25 aristocrats, relatives of the Sultan of Pontianak, and many other prominent individuals were named as participants in the plot by the Japanese and then executed at Mandor. The Sultans of Pontianak, Sambas, Ketapang, Soekadana, Simbang, Koeboe, Ngabang, Sanggau, Sekadau, Tajan, Singtan, and Mempawa were all executed by the Japanese, respectively, their names were Sjarif Mohamed Alkadri, Mohamad Ibrahim Tsafidedin, Goesti Saoenan, Tengkoe Idris, Goesti Mesir, Sjarif Saleh, Goesti Abdoel Hamid, Ade Mohamad Arif, Goesti Mohamad Kelip, Goesti Djapar, Raden Abdul Bahri Danoe Perdana, and Mohammed Ahoufiek. They are known as the "12 Dokoh". In Java, the Japanese jailed Syarif Abdul Hamid Alqadrie, the son of Sultan Syarif Mohamad Alkadrie. Since he was in Java during the executions, the future Hamid II was the only male in his family not killed, while the Japanese beheaded all 28 other male relatives of Pontianak Sultan Mohammed Alkadri.

Later in 1944, the Dayaks assassinated a Japanese man named Nakatani, who was involved in the incident and who was known for his cruelty. Sultan of Pontianak Mohamed Alkadri's fourth son, Pengeran Agoen (Pangeran Agung), and another son, Pengeran Adipati (Pangeran Adipati), were both killed by the Japanese in the incident. The Japanese had beheaded both Pangeran Adipati and Pangeran Agung, in a public execution. The Japanese extermination of the Malay elite of Pontianak paved the way for a new Dayak elite to arise in its place. According to Mary F. Somers Heidhues, during May and June 1945, some Japanese were killed in a rebellion by the Dayaks in Sanggau. According to Jamie S. Davidson, this rebellion, during which many Dayaks and Japanese were killed, occurred from April through August 1945, and was called the "Majang Desa War". The Pontianak Incidents, or Affairs, are divided into two Pontianak incidents by scholars, variously categorised according to mass killings and arrests, which occurred in several stages on different dates. The Pontianak incident negatively impacted the Chinese community in Kalimantan.

The Acehnese Ulama (Islamic clerics) fought against both the Dutch and the Japanese, revolting against the Dutch in February 1942 and against Japan in November 1942. The revolt was led by the All-Aceh Religious Scholars' Association (PUSA), and was centred around Tjot Plieng village religious school. Japanese troops armed with mortars and machine guns were attacked by sword-wielding Acehnese led by Tengku Abdul Djalil. The Japanese suffered 18 dead in the uprising while over a hundred Acehnese died, and the school and village mosque were destroyed.

=== Support for independence ===
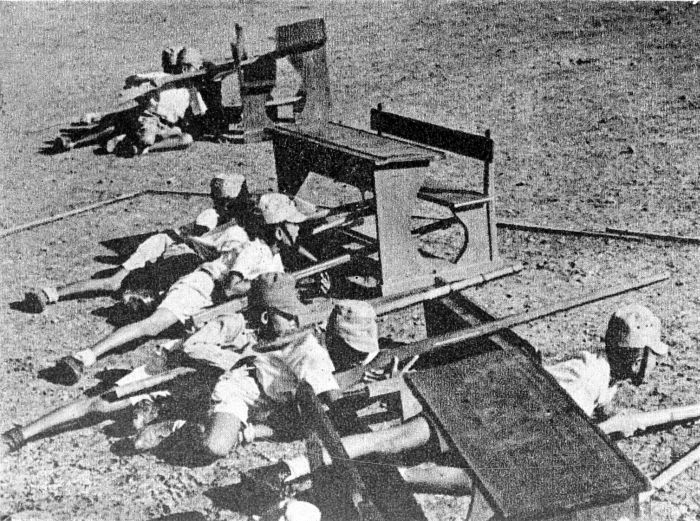
Young Indonesian boys being trained by the Imperial Japanese Army

Before the war, the Dutch colonial authorities had successfully repressed the Indonesian nationalist movement. In the initial stages of the occupation, the Japanese were completely opposed to independence because of possible disruption to the exploitation of the resources in the archipelago that were so important to the war effort. In contrast, the occupied Philippines and Burma were granted independence in 1943, and in March that year, the Japanese decided to include Indonesia within the Japanese Empire but to allow "political participation of the natives", a decision strongly opposed by the 25th Army in Sumatra and the Navy in the eastern islands.

In November 1943, the Japanese held a Greater East Asia Conference in Tokyo attended by the notionally independent countries of the Co-Prosperity Sphere, including Thailand, the Philippines and Burma, but no Indonesian representatives were invited. By way of compensation, pre-war independence figure Sukarno, Hatta and Hajar Dewantara were invited to Tokyo just after the conference, and were granted an audience with Emperor Hirohito and met Prime Minister Tojo. However, they were given no positive indications about future Indonesian independence, and there was to be no lifting of the ban on the flag or national anthem.

As Japan's territorial expansion was halted, then reversed, Japan, the 16th Army in Java in particular, became more favorable to the idea of Indonesian involvement in the governance of Java. A Central Advisory Board was established, headed by pre-war independence figure Sukarno, with Indonesians appointed as advisors. In October 1943, the Japanese established a volunteer force to defend against a future allied invasion, the Defenders of the Homeland (Indonesian: Pembela Tanah Air, PETA; Japanese: 郷土防衛義勇軍, romanized: kyōdo bōei giyūgun). Then in 1944 the Java Service Association (Jawa Hokokai) was formed to mobilise the masses for Japanese interests.

On 7 September 1944, Japanese Prime Minister Kuniaki Koiso promised independence for the East Indies "in the future". The authorities in Java then allowed the flying of the Indonesian flag at Jawa Hokokai buildings. Naval liaison officer in Batavia Rear-admiral Tadashi Maeda provided official funds for tours around the archipelago by Sukarno and fellow independence activist Hatta, officially as part of their Jawa Hokokai responsibilities. In October 1944, Maeda established a Free Indonesia Dormitory to prepare youth leaders for an independent Indonesia. With the war situation becoming increasingly dire, in March 1945 the Japanese announced the formation of an Investigating Committee for Preparatory Work for Independence (Indonesian: Badan Penyelidik Usaha Persiapan Kemerdekaan (BPUPK); Japanese: 独立準備調査会, Dokuritsu Junbi Chōsakai), comprising members of the older political generation, including Sukarno and Hatta, to work on "preparations for independence in the region of the government of this island of Java". Established on 29 April 1945 by Lt. Gen. Kumakichi Harada, the commander of the 16th Army in Java, it was chaired by Rajiman Wediodiningrat. In two sessions in May and June, it decided on the basis for an independent nation and produced a draft constitution. Meanwhile, the younger activists, known as the pemuda, wanted much more overt moves towards independence than the older generation were willing to risk, resulting in a split between the generations.

1966 ABC report examining Sukarno's alliance between imperial Japan and the Indonesian nationalist movement

== End of occupation ==
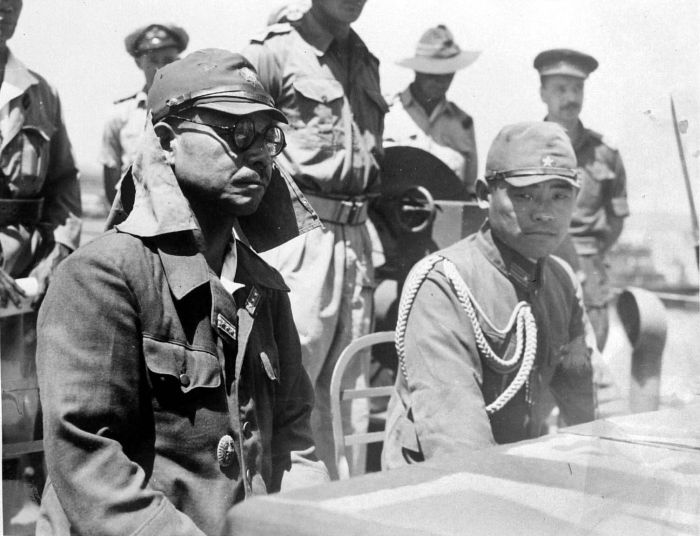
Japanese commanders listening to the terms of surrender

General Douglas MacArthur wanted to fight his way with Allied troops to liberate Java in 1944–45 but was ordered not to by the Joint Chiefs and President Franklin Roosevelt. He did successfully conduct the Western New Guinea campaign in 1944 which liberated much of Dutch New Guinea. The US-built Naval Base Morotai, which opened in September 1944 after the Battle of Morotai, so they could use the facilities for the Philippines campaign. Some Australian bases were built during the war. The Borneo campaign between May and July 1945 was ordered by MacArthur to liberate British Borneo and Dutch Borneo. The Japanese occupation officially ended with the Japanese surrender in the Pacific, and two days later Sukarno declared Indonesian Independence; Indonesian forces spent the next four years fighting the Dutch for independence. According to historian Theodore Friend, American restraint from fighting their way into Java saved Japanese, Javanese, Dutch, and American lives, but also impeded international support for Indonesian independence.

At the end of the war, there were around 300,000 Japanese civilian and military personnel in the East Indies. The Dutch East Indies, alongside French Indochina, were transferred from the American-led South West Pacific Area command to the UK-led South East Asia Command effective 15 August 1945. Consequently, the UK became the lead nation in the reoccupation of the territories. The priorities for the UK occupation was to take the surrender of, and repatriate, Japanese forces, and also the Recovery of Allied Prisoners of War and Internees operation. Repatriation of Japanese prisoners of war was delayed because of their low priority for sea-borne transport in the Allied Shipping Pool. By April 1946, only 48,000 had been repatriated; the majority were evacuated in May and June. However, around 100,000 Japanese prisoners of war were retained for use as labour until early 1946. It was reported that approximately 25,000 Japanese soldiers allied themselves with Indonesian nationalists and were subsequently beyond Allied control. Some eventually assimilated themselves into local communities. Many of these soldiers joined the TNI or other Indonesian military organizations, and some of these former Japanese soldiers died during the Indonesian National Revolution, such as Abdul Rachman (Ichiki Tatsuo).

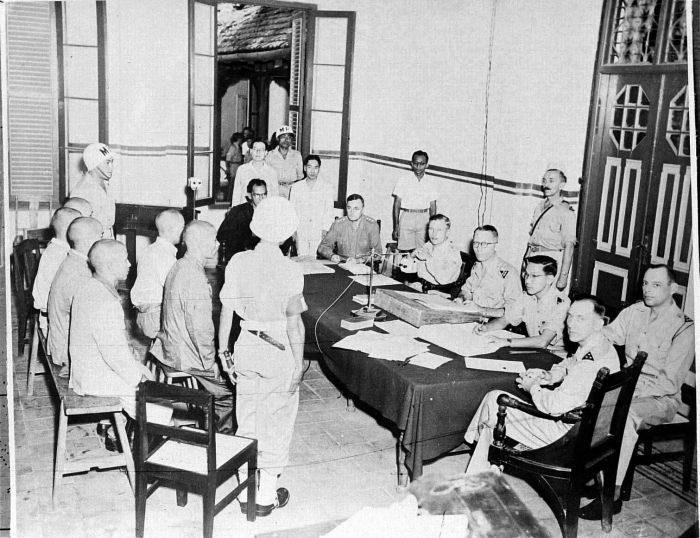
Japanese soldiers on trial

The final stages of warfare were initiated in October 1945 when, in accordance with the terms of their surrender, the Japanese tried to re-establish the authority they relinquished to Indonesians in the towns and cities. Japanese military police killed Republican pemuda in Pekalongan (Central Java) on 3 October, and Japanese troops drove Republican pemuda out of Bandung in West Java and handed the city to the British, but the fiercest fighting involving the Japanese was in Semarang. On 14 October, British forces began to occupy the city. Retreating Republican forces retaliated by killing between 130 and 300 Japanese prisoners they were holding. Five hundred Japanese and 2,000 Indonesians had been killed and the Japanese had almost captured the city six days later when British forces arrived.

I, of course, knew that we had been forced to keep Japanese troops under arms to protect our lines of communication and vital areas ... but it was nevertheless a great shock to me to find over a thousand Japanese troops guarding the nine miles of road from the airport to the town.

— Lord Mountbatten of Burma in April 1946 after visiting Sumatra, referring to the use of Japanese Surrendered Personnel.

From 6 March 1946 to 24 December 1949, the returning Dutch authorities held 448 war crimes trials against 1,038 suspects. 969 of those were condemned (93.4%) with 236 (24.4%) receiving a death sentence.

== See also ==
- Bulu prison massacre
- Japanese colonial empire
  - Japanese occupation of West Sumatra
- Japanese-run internment camps
