= Pontianak incidents =

1943–1944 massacres in Indonesia by Japan

Pontianak incident
- Part of World War II
- Location: Kalimantan, Dutch East Indies
- Target: Mainly Malay, Javanese and other natives (these included Menadonese, Dayaks, Bugis, Bataks, Minangkabau). A relatively small number of Chinese, Arabs, and Indians were among the victims.
- Attack type: Massacre
- Deaths: 21,000+ killed
- Perpetrator: Kempeitai

The Pontianak incident consisted of two massacres which took place in Kalimantan during the Japanese occupation of the Dutch East Indies. One of them is also known as the Mandor Affair. The victims were from a wide variety of ethnic groups, and the killings devastated the Malay elite of Kalimantan, with all the Malay Sultans of Kalimantan executed by the Japanese.

== The massacres ==
In the 1943–1944 Pontianak incident, the Japanese orchestrated a mass arrest of Chinese, Malay elites, Javanese, Menadonese, Dayaks, Bugis, Bataks, and Minangkabau in Kalimantan, including all of the Malay Sultans, accused them of plotting to overthrow Japanese rule, and then massacred them. The Japanese falsely claimed that all of those ethnic groups, and organisations such as the Islamic Pemuda Muhammadijah, were involved in a plot to overthrow the Japanese and create a "People's Republic of West Borneo" (Negara Rakyat Borneo Barat).

The Japanese claimed that, "Sultans, Chinese, Indonesian government officials, Indians and Arabs, who had been antagonistic to each other, joined together to massacre Japanese", naming the Sultan of the Pontianak Sultanate as one of the "ringleaders" in the planned rebellion. Up to 25 aristocrats, relatives of the Sultan of Pontianak, and many other prominent individuals were named as participants in the plot by the Japanese and then executed at Mandor.

The Sultans of Pontianak, Sambas, Ketapang, Soekadana, Simpang, Koeboe, Ngabang, Sanggau, Sekadau, Tajan, Sintang, and Mempawa were all executed by the Japanese; respectively, their names were Sjarif Mohamed Alkadri, Mohamad Ibrahim Tsafidedin, Goesti Saoenan, Tengkoe Idris, Goesti Mesir, Sjarif Saleh, Goesti Abdoel Hamid, Ade Mohamad Arif, Goesti Mohamad Kelip, Goesti Djapar, Raden Abdul Bahri Danoe Perdana, and Mohammed Ahoufiek. They are known as the "12 Tokoh". In Java, the Japanese jailed Syarif Abdul Hamid Alqadrie, the son of Sultan Syarif Mohamad Alkadrie (Sjarif Mohamed Alkadri). Since he was in Java during the executions Hamid II was the only male in his family not killed, while the Japanese beheaded all 28 other male relatives of Pontianak Sultan Mohammed Alkadri.

Among the 29 people of the Sultan of Pontianak's family who were beheaded by the Japanese was the heir to the Pontianak throne. Later in 1944, the Dayaks assassinated a Japanese officer named Nakatani, who was involved in the incident and who was known for his cruelty. Sultan of Pontianak Mohamed Alkadri's fourth son, Pengeran Agoen (Pangeran Agung), and another son, Pengeran Adipati (Pangeran Adipati), were both beheaded by the Japanese in a public execution.

The Japanese extermination of the Malay elite of Pontianak paved the way for a new Dayak elite to arise in its place. According to Mary F. Somers Heidhues, during May and June 1945, some Japanese were killed in a rebellion by the Dayaks in Sanggau. According to Jamie S. Davidson, this rebellion, during which many Dayaks and Japanese were killed, occurred from April through August 1945, and was called the "Majang Desa War". The Pontianak Incidents, or Affairs, are divided into two Pontianak incidents by scholars, variously categorised according to mass killings and arrests, which occurred in several stages on different dates.

The Pontianak incident negatively impacted the Chinese community in Kalimantan.

== See also ==
- Tadashige Daigo
- Japanese war crimes
