= Syarif Abdurrahman Alkadrie =

Founder and the first Sultan of Pontianak

Syarif Abdurrahman Alkadrie شريف عبدالرحمن القادري
- Sultan of Pontianak

Sultan of Pontianak
- Reign: 31 August 1778 – 28 February 1808
- Coronation: 31 August 1778
- Predecessor: Title created
- Successor: Syarif Kasim Alkadrie
- Born: 1729/30
- Died: 28 February 1808
- Spouse: Utin Candramidi; Nyai Kusuma Sari; Utin Kasmiri
- Issue: Syarif Kasim Alkadrie; Syarif Osman Alkadrie; Syarif Husein Alkadrie; Syarif Muhammad Alwi Alkadrie; Syarifah Salmah Alkadrie; Syarifah Aisyah Alkadrie
Names
- Syarif Abdurrahman bin Habib Husein Alkadrie (شريف عبدالرحمن بن حبيب حسين القادري)
Regnal name
- Sultan Syarif Abdurrahman bin Habib Husein Alkadrie (سلطان شريف عبدالرحمن بن حبيب حسين القادري)
- House: Alkadrie
- Father: Syarif Habib Husein bin Ahmad Alkadrie
- Mother: Nyai Tua Utin Kabanat
- Religion: Sunni Islam

Sultan Syarif Abdurrahman bin Syarif Habib Husein Alkadrie (Jawi: سلطان شريف عبدالرحمن بن شريف حبيب حسين القادري; b. 1729/30 – d. 28 February 1808) was the founder and the first Sultan of Pontianak. He was born in 1729/30, the son of Syarif Habib Husein bin Ahmad Alkadrie, an Arab Islamic preacher, and Nyai Tua Utin Kabanat, daughter of Sultan Muhammad Zainuddin of Matan.

== Biography ==
Three months after his father died in Mempawah, Abdurrahman together with his brothers agreed to find a new residence. They set off with 14 boats down the Peniti River. When it was time for Dhuhr prayer, they arrived at a headland, where Syarif Abdurrahman and his followers settled, which is now known as Kelapa Tinggi Segedong. However, Abdurrahman felt that the place was not suitable to live in and decided to continue his journey upstream. While walking down the Kapuas River, they found an island which is now called Batu Layang, where Abdurrahman and his descendants are buried. On the island, they got disturbed by the ghost of Pontianak or Kuntilanak and Abdurrahman then ordered all his followers to fight the ghosts. The group later continued their journey down the Kapuas River.

Towards the dawn of the 23rd of October 1771, they arrived at the junction of the Kapuas River and the Landak River. After eight days of cutting down trees on the island, Abdurrahman then built a house and a hall, and then the place was named Pontianak. In that place now stands the Jami Mosque and the Kadriyah Palace.

Finally, on the 31st of August 1778, attended by the Yang di-Pertuan Muda of Riau, the Raja of Mempawah, the Raja of Landak, the Raja of Kubu, and the Sultan of Matan, Abdurrahman was crowned Sultan of Pontianak with the title Sultan Syarif Abdurrahman bin Syarif Habib Husein Alkadrie. Under his leadership, the Sultanate developed as a port and trade city that was quite respected.

=== Reign ===
In the beginning of his reign, there was conflict between Pontianak and the Landak Kingdom regarding a territorial dispute. The Dutch used this conflict to exert influence in Kalimantan. In late 1778, the Dutch sent their envoys to Pontianak to begin negotiations with Abdurrahman, but failed. However, because the power of Banten, which controlled the conflicted area, was weakening, its territory in Borneo was finally transferred to the Dutch. The Dutch, eager to establish a representative office in Pontianak, sent envoys in mid-1779. Finally, an agreement was agreed with Abdurrahman, which stated that the Dutch would lend the Pontianak and Sanggau areas to Abdurrahman.

This event marked the start of Dutch control in Pontianak, which later developed into a trade monopoly. After that, Pontianak was obliged to hand over all the commodities that the Dutch wanted. The planting of crops was also closely monitored by the Dutch. In addition, export and import taxes must be shared between the Dutch and Pontianak. The Pontianak Sultanate also allowed the Dutch to build a fort west of the Kapuas River.

=== Death ===
Abdurrahman died on a Friday evening, on 28 February 1808. He was succeeded by his son, Syarif Kasim Alkadrie.

Syarif Abdurrahman Alkadrie House of Alkadrie Cadet branch of the Ba 'Alawi sada Born: 1729/1730 Died: 28 February 1808
Regnal titles
| Preceded by Title created | Sultan of Pontianak; 31 August 1778 – 28 February 1808 | Succeeded by Syarif Kasim Alkadrie |
