= Mempawah Kingdom =

Islamic Malay-Dayak kingdom

Mempawah Kingdom کرجاءن ممڤاوه Kerajaan Mempawah
- 1740–1944
- Flag
- Status: Kingdom
- Capital: Mempawah
- Common languages: Malay
- Religion: Animism-Hinduism then Sunni Islam
- Panembahan Sultan
  - 1740-1761: Pangeran Mas Surya Negara @ Opu Daeng Menambun
  - 1820-1831: Sultan Muhammad Zainal Abidin
  - 1902-1944: Sultan Muhammad Thaufik Accamuddin
- History
  - Established: 1740
  - Disestablished: 1944
Preceded by	Succeeded by
Bangkule Sultankng Kingdom; Sidiniang Kingdom	Indonesia
- Today part of: Indonesia

The Mempawah Kingdom (Malay: کرجاءن ممڤاوه, romanized: Kerajaan Mempawah) also known as the Mempawah Sultanate, was a Malay-Dayak kingdom located in a territory now known as the Mempawah Regency, West Kalimantan, Indonesia. The name Mempawah is taken from the term "Mempauh", which is the name of a tree that grows in the upper reaches of the river, also known as the Mempawah River. In its development, Mempawah became known as the name of one of the kingdoms and sultanates that developed in West Borneo. The history of Mempawah is divided into two periods, namely the Malay-Dayak kingdom based on Hindu teachings and the period of Islamic influence.

== History ==
=== Dayak-Hindu period ===
The forerunner of Mempawah is closely related to the history of several predecessor kingdoms, including the Bangkule Sultankng Kingdom and the Sidiniang Kingdom. The Bangkule Sultankng Kingdom is a Dayak kingdom founded by Ne'Rumaga in a place called Bahana.

The Dayak kingdom led by Patih Gumantar is an independent kingdom that has existed since around 1380. Because the center of this kingdom is in the Sidiniang Mountains, it was known as the Sidiniang Kingdom.

It is said that Patih Gumantar had an agreement with Gajah Mada from the Majapahit Empire to unite the countries in the archipelago under the control of the Majapahit Empire. Patih Gumantar and Gajah Mada are said to have traveled together to Muang Thai to resist the attack of Kublai Khan of the Mongol Empire. Evidence of the relationship between the Sidiniang Kingdom and the Majapahit Empire is the existence of a keris (ceremonial knife) that was presented to Patih Gumantar. This knife is still stored in Hulu Mempawah, and the heirloom is referred to as "Keris Susuhunan".

The existence of the Sidiniang Kingdom was always being threatened. One of the attacks on the kingdom was from a Biaju kingdom. In the battle that took place around 1400, there was a beheading war that resulted in the death of Patih Gumantar. With the death of Patih Gumantar, the history of the Sidiniang Kingdom came to an end. However, there is an opinion that the position of Patih Gumantar was continued by his son named Patih Nyabakng. However, the reign of Patih Nyabakng did not last long because the Sidiniang Kingdom was involved in a dispute with the Lara Kingdom which was centered in Sungai Raya Negeri Sambas. After the leadership of Patih Nyabakng, the history of the Sidiniang Kingdom could not be traced again.

Two hundred years later, or around 1610, a new government was established that was built on the former ruins of the Sidiniang Kingdom. The relationship between the founder of this new kingdom and Patih Gumantar is not yet known. Also, several references found mentioned that the leader of this new kingdom was named Raja Kodong or Raja Kudung. Raja Kudung then moved the center of his government from Sidiniang to Pekana.

Around the year 1680, Raja Kudung died and was buried in Pekana. The successor of Raja Kudung was Panembahan Senggaok, also known as Senggauk or Sengkuwuk, who ruled since 1680. The mention of the name "Senggaok" was used in conjunction with the transfer of the central government from Pekana to Senggaok, an area upstream of the Mempawah River. Panembahan Senggaok married the daughter of Raja Kahar of the Batu Rizal Kingdom in Sumatra, named Putri Cermin, and they had a daughter named Putri Utin Indrawati. Putri Utin Indrawati was then married to Sultan Muhammad Zainuddin of the Tanjungpura Kingdom. From this marriage, they had a daughter named Putri Kesumba. Putri Kesumba was then married to Opu Daeng Menambun, a pioneer of Islamic influence in Mempawah and one of the five Bugis brothers.

=== Opu Daeng Menambun's reign and Islamic influence ===
Opu Daeng Menambun comes from the Bugis Luwu Kingdom in South Sulawesi. Opu Daeng Menambun's father named Opu Tendriburang Daeng Rilaga traveled from Sulawesi to the countries in the Malayan Peninsula. Opu Tendriburang Daeng Rilaga is the son of Opu La Maddusila, the first Bugis king to convert to Islam. Opu Tenrri borong Daeng Rilekke had five sons who were invited to travel to the Malayan Peninsula. The five children of Opu Tendriburang Daeng Rilaga were Opu Daeng Menambun, Opu Daeng Parani, Opu Daeng Chelak, Opu Daeng Marewah, and Opu Daeng Kemasi. Their arrival to the Malayan Peninsula became one of the migration stages of the Bugis people that occurred in the 17th century. Opu Tendriburang Daeng Rilaga and his five sons played an important role in the Malayan Peninsula and Borneo, especially in the spread of Islam.

The arrival of Opu Daeng Menambun to Borneo was actually at the request of Sultan Muhammad Zainuddin (1665–1724), to reclaim the throne of the Matan Sultanate which was forcibly taken by Pangeran Agung, brother of Sultan Muhammad Zainuddin. Opu Daeng Menambun's brothers, who were in the Johor Sultanate at the time helping quell the upheaval there, immediately left for Matan. With the help of the Bugis brothers, the throne of Sultan Muhammad Zainuddin was saved. Opu Daeng Menambun was then married to Ratu Kesumba, daughter of Sultan Muhammad Zainuddin. Not long after, Opu Daeng Menambun's brothers returned to the Johor Sultanate.

After the death of Opu Daeng Menambun's brothers, internal turmoil occurred again in the Matan Sultanate. Sultan Muhammad Zainuddin's children argued over who had the right to inherit the throne of the Matan Sultanate if their father died. Sultan Muhammad Zainuddin again asked for help from Opu Daeng Menambun who had returned to the Johor Sultanate. Opu Daeng Menambun complied with Sultan Muhammad Zainuddin's request and immediately headed to Matan for the second time, while his four other brothers did not participate because their energy was needed to help the Johor Sultanate.

Thanks to Opu Daeng Menambun, disputes in the Matan Sultanate could soon be resolved peacefully. For the services of Opu Daeng Menambun, Sultan Muhammad Zainuddin was pleased to bestow Opu Daeng Menambun with the honorary title of Pangeran Mas Surya Negara. Opu Daeng Menambun decided to stay in the Matan Sultanate with his wife, and they had several children together named Putri Candramidi, Gusti Jamiril, Syarif Ahmad, Syarif Abubakar, Syarif Alwi, and Syarif Muhammad.

In 1724, Sultan Muhammad Zainuddin passed away. His successor was Gusti Kesuma Bandan who holds the title Sultan Muhammad Muazzuddin (1724–1738). Meanwhile, in Mempawah, Panembahan Senggaok died in 1737. Due to Panembahan Senggaok not having a son, the throne of Mempawah was given to Sultan Muhammad Muazzuddin who was none other than Panembahan Senggaok's grandson from Putri Utin Indrawati who married Sultan Muhammad Zainuddin. However, a year later or in 1738, Sultan Muhammad Muazzuddin also died and was replaced by his son named Gusti Bendung or Pangeran Ratu Agung with the title Sultan Muhammad Tajuddin (1738–1749).

In 1740, power over Mempawah, which was concurrent with the Matan Sultanate, was handed over to Opu Daeng Menambun who later adopted the title Pangeran Mas Surya Negara, a title previously given by the late Sultan Muhammad Zainuddin. Meanwhile, Opu Daeng Menambun's wife, Ratu Kesumba, holds the title Ratu Agung Sinuhun. It was during the Opu Daeng Menambun's era that Islam became the official religion of the kingdom. Opu Daeng Menambun moved the center of his government from Senggaok to Bukit Rama which was a fertile, prosperous, and strategic area, and was crowded with traders.

The influence of Islam in Mempawah during Opu Daeng Menambun's reign was even greater thanks to the role of Syarif Habib Husein Alkadrie (father of Syarif Abdurrahman Alkadrie), a traveler who came from Hadhramaut or South Yemen. Husein Alkadrie had previously served as the main judge in the Matan Sultanate during the reign of Sultan Muhammad Muazzuddin. Husein Alkadrie was married to the daughter of Sultan Muhammad Muazzuddin named Nyai Tua Utin Kabanat. In the Matan Sultanate, Husein Alkadrie served until the reign of the 4th Sultan of Matan, namely Sultan Ahmad Kamaluddin, who succeeded Sultan Muhammad Tajuddin in 1749. However, in 1755, Husein Alkadrie disagreed with Sultan Ahmad Kamaluddin about the application of the death penalty.

Seeing this condition, Opu Daeng Menambun offered Husein Alkadrie to live in Mempawah. The offer was accepted by Husein Alkadrie who immediately moved to the Opu Daeng Menambun's Palace. Husein Alkadrie was later appointed as Patih and Mufti of Mempawah. In addition, Husein Alkadrie was allowed to occupy the Kuala Mempawah (Galah Herang) area to serve as a center for teaching Islam. To further strengthen the relationship between Husein Alkadrie's family and Mempawah, marriage was held between Husein Alkadrie's son, Syarif Abdurrahman Alkadrie, and Utin Candramidi (Opu Daeng Menambun's daughter). Later, in 1771, Syarif Abdurrahman Alkadrie founded the Pontianak Sultanate.

In 1761, Opu Daeng Menambun died and was buried in Bukit Rama. The next successor of Mempawah was the son of Opu Daeng Menambun, namely Gusti Jamiril who had the title Panembahan Adiwijaya Kusumajaya. Under the leadership of Panembahan Adiwijaya, Mempawah's territory expanded and became known as a bustling trading port.

=== Dutch intervention and colonization ===
Not long after the Dutch landed in Mempawah in about 1787, there was a battle against the troops of Mempawah led by Panembahan Adiwijaya. Syarif Kasim Alkadrie, son of Syarif Abdurrahman Alkadrie, was persuaded by the Dutch to join in the attack on Mempawah. Panembahan Adiwijaya finally withdrew to Karangan in Mempawah to arrange a counterattack. However, in 1790, Panembahan Adiwijaya died before he could launch a counterattack and left 8 children from two wives.

Around 1794, the dispute between Mempawah and the Pontianak Sultanate grew worse because the Dutch succeeded in persuading Syarif Kasim Alkadrie to expand the Kadriyah Palace to the upper reaches of the river close to the borders of Mempawah. As a result, the war flared up again in which the Pontianak Sultanate was assisted by the Chinese in Pontianak. The stronghold of Mempawah, which at that time did not have a new king to replace Panembahan Adiwijaya, received support from the Dayak people and the Singkawang Sultanate. However, because the Pontianak Sultanate was fully supported by the Dutch, Mempawah was defeated in the war.

Subsequently, the Dutch appointed Syarif Kasim Alkadrie as the ruler of Mempawah with the title Panembahan Mempawah. His father, Sultan Syarif Abdurrahman Alkadrie, did not approve of the appointment because between Mempawah and the Pontianak Sultanate there were still close kinship ties. Sultan Syarif Abdurrahman Alkadrie's wife, Utin Candramidi, is the daughter of Opu Daeng Menambun, the first ruler of Mempawah. The appointment of Syarif Kasim Alkadrie as Panembahan was enshrined in the agreement dated 27 August 1787.

In 1808, Sultan Syarif Abdurrahman Alkadrie died and the Dutch appointed Syarif Kasim Alkadrie as ruler of the Pontianak Sultanate with the title Sultan Syarif Kasim Alkadrie. After Syarif Kasim Alkadrie became the Sultan of Pontianak, his position in Mempawah was replaced by his brother, Syarif Husein Alkadrie. However, Syarif Husein Alkadrie's power did not last long because the Dutch power in Mempawah began to falter due to the resistance led by two sons of Panembahan Adiwijaya, namely the crown prince, Gusti Jati, and his brother, Gusti Mas. When the Dutch were finally expelled from Mempawah, Gusti Jati was crowned the Sultan of Mempawah. The Dutch then retreated to the Pontianak Sultanate under the protection of Sultan Syarif Kasim Alkadrie.

Gusti Jati was crowned the leader of Mempawah around 1820 with the title Sultan Muhammad Zainal Abidin. Gusti Mas helps his brother develop the lives and security of the people of Mempawah. Sultan Muhammad Zainal Abidin moved the center of the government to the banks of the Mempawah River, to be precise on Pulau Pedalaman. It was in this era that Mempawah became increasingly famous as a trading center and a strong fortress. Seeing Mempawah getting more and more prosperous, the Dutch devised tactics. The Dutch tried peaceful means to deal with Sultan Muhammad Zainal Abidin, while the army of the Pontianak Sultanate was prepared to attack immediately when Mempawah was off guard.

The Dutch tactics worked. When the courtiers of Mempawah were lulled by the Dutch call for peace, the Pontianak Sultanate's war fleet invaded Pulau Pedalaman. Evidence of this attack can still be seen in the former fortifications built on the right and left sides of the Mempawah Palace. As a result of the sudden attack, Sultan Muhammad Zainal Abidin was forced to return to Bukit Rama to gather strength. Sultan Muhammad Zainal Abidin's counterattack paid off, the Pontianak Sultanate's army was defeated. However, Sultan Muhammad Zainal Abidin did not return to Pulau Pedalaman, he chose to march upstream of the Mempawah River.

There was another vacancy in the leadership of Mempawah, and again the Dutch took advantage of this opportunity by appointing Sultan Muhammad Zainal Abidin's younger brother, Gusti Amin, as the Sultan of Mempawah with the title Panembahan Adinata Krama Umar Kamaruddin. In 1831, Mempawah weakened due to Dutch intervention. Since then, every succession of Mempawah has become a political game orchestrated by the Dutch. In addition, Mempawah had to comply with the rules made by the Dutch.

After Gusti Amin died in 1839, the Dutch crowned Gusti Mukmin as Sultan of Mempawah with the title Panembahan Mukmin Nata Jaya Kusuma. Furthermore, in 1858, the Dutch installed Gusti Makhmud as the Sultan of Mempawah with the title Panembahan Muda Makhmud Alauddin. In 1858 Gusti Usman was also appointed as the Sultan of Mempawah. From that writing, it is possible that Gusti Makhmud died not long after being crowned. Gusti Usman, son of Gusti Mukmin, was temporarily appointed Sultan of Mempawah. This possibility is close to the truth because when Gusti Usman died in 1872, the appointed Sultan of Mempawah was Gusti Ibrahim with the title Panembahan Ibrahim Muhammad Syafiuddin, who was none other than the son of Gusti Makhmud.

When Gusti Ibrahim died in 1892, the crown prince, Gusti Muhammad Thaufik Accamuddin, was deemed not old enough to be appointed as his successor. Therefore, Gusti Intan, the older sister of Gusti Muhammad Thaufik Accamuddin, was temporarily made regent of Mempawah. Gusti Muhammad Thaufik Accamuddin only ascended the throne in 1902. This sultan built the Amantubillah Wa Rasulillah Palace on Pulau Pedalaman in 1922. The reign of Sultan Muhammad Thaufik Accamuddin continued until the arrival of the Japanese in Indonesia in 1942.

=== Japanese invasion ===
The Japanese invasion of South East Asia caused tragedy for the kingdoms in West Borneo, including Mempawah and the Pontianak Sultanate. In 1944, Sultan Muhammad Thaufik Accamuddin was taken prisoner by the Japanese army until the end of his life. Until now, the body or tomb of Sultan Muhammad Thaufik Accamuddin has not been found. Because the crown prince, Gusti Jimmi Muhammad Ibrahim, was not yet an adult, the Japanese appointed Gusti Mustaan as Deputy Panembahan of Mempawah who served until 1955. However, at that time Gusti Jimmi Muhammad Ibrahim was not willing to be crowned Sultan of Mempawah because he still wanted to complete his education in Yogyakarta. Therefore, Sultan Muhammad Thaufik Accamuddin is considered to be the last Sultan of Mempawah.

=== Present-day Mempawah ===
After Indonesia's independence in 1945, followed by the full recognition of sovereignty from the Netherlands to Indonesia in 1949, there was a significant overhaul in the system of government, including the system of government in the regions. This also happened in West Kalimantan, with the formation of the Republic of Indonesia, all authority that had been delegated to the Special Region of West Kalimantan was returned to the Republic of Indonesia.

In the end, at the urging of the people and the Dayak and Malay-Bugis traditional leaders, Gusti Jimmi Muhammad Ibrahim finally agreed to be crowned as the customary holder of the Mempawah. Because they have joined and become part of the Republic of Indonesia, the leadership of Gusti Jimmi Muhammad Ibrahim, who holds the title of Panembahan XII of Mempawah, no longer has political authority.

On 12 August 2002, due to an incurable illness, Panembahan Gusti Jimmi Muhammad Ibrahim handed over the power of the Mempawah Sultanate to his son, Pangeran Ratu Mulawangsa Mardan Adijaya Kesuma Ibrahim, who was crowned as Panembahan XII of Mempawah and reigns to this day. In 2005, Panembahan Jimmi Muhammad Ibrahim died at the age of 73 and was buried in a traditional ceremony of Mempawah.

== List of Mempawah rulers and genealogy ==
=== Hindu-Dayak rulers ===
1. Patih Gumantar (c. 1380)
2. Raja Kudung (c. 1610)
3. Panembahan Senggaok (c. 1680)

=== Muslim rulers ===
1. Pangeran Mas Surya Negara @ Opu Daeng Menambun (1740 – 1761), one of the five Buginese-Malays brothers from Sulawesi
2. Gusti Jamiril with the title Panembahan Adiwijaya Kusumajaya (1761 – 1787), son of Opu Daeng Menambun
3. Syarif Kasim Alkarie with the title Panembahan Mempawah (1787 – 1808), grandson of Opu Daeng Menambun and son of Sultan Syarif Abdurrahman of Pontianak
4. Syarif Husein Alkadrie (1808 – 1820), brother of Syarif Kasim
5. Gusti Jati with the title Paduka Sri Sultan Muhammad Zainal Abidin (1820 – 1831), son of Gusti Jamiril
6. Gusti Amin with the title Panembahan Adinata Krama Umar Kamaruddin (1831 – 1839), son of Gusti Jamiril
7. Gusti Mukmin with the title Panembahan Mukmin Nata Jaya Kusuma (1839 – 1858), son of Gusti Amin
8. Gusti Makhmud with the title Panembahan Muda Makhmud Alauddin (1858), son of Gusti Mukmin
9. Gusti Usman with the title Panembahan Usman (1858 – 1872), son of Gusti Mukmin
10. Gusti Ibrahim with the title Panembahan Ibrahim Muhammad Syafiuddin (1872 – 1892), son of Gusti Makhmud
11. Gusti Intan with the title Ratu Permaisuri (1892 – 1902), daughter of Gusti Ibrahim
12. Gusti Muhammad Thaufik Accamuddin with the title Sultan Muhammad Thaufik Accamuddin (1902 – 1944), son of Gusti Ibrahim

=== Family tree of Mempawah monarchs ===
the House of Opu Daeng Menambun of the House of Royal Buginese Luwu

Pangeran Mas Surya Negara @ Opu Daeng Menambun^{(1)} r. 1740-1761
Adiwijaya; Kusumajaya^{(2)} r. 1761-1787	♀ Utin; Candramidi	Syarif; Abdurrahman; Sultan of Pontianak
Muhammad; Zainal Abidin^{(5)} r. 1820-1831	Adinata; Krama Umar; Kamaruddin^{(6)} r. 1831-1839	Syarif Kasim^{(3)} r. 1787-1808	Syarif Husein^{(4)} r. 1808-1820
Mukmin Nata; Jaya Kusuma^{(7)} r. 1839-1858
Makhmud; Alauddin^{(8)} r. 1858	Usman^{(9)} r. 1858-1872
Ibrahim; Muhammad; Syafiuddin^{(10)} r. 1872-1892
♀ Ratu; Permaisuri^{(11)} r. 1892-1902	Muhammad; Thaufik; Accamuddin^{(12)} r. 1902-1944
