= Tadashige Daigo =

Japanese officer, war criminal 1891–1947

Marquis Tadashige Daigo
- 醍醐 忠重
- Born: October 15, 1891; Chiyoda, Tokyo, Japan
- Died: December 6, 1947 (aged 56); Pontianak, Borneo, Dutch East Indies
- Cause of death: Execution by shooting
- Military career
- Allegiance: Empire of Japan
- Branch: Imperial Japanese Navy
- Service years: 1912–1945
- Rank: Vice Admiral
- Commands: SS-27, SS-57, Ro-64, Yubari, Naka, Kuma, Iwate, Tokiwa, Yakumo, Ashigara; Submarine Squadron 5, Eastern Attack Group, 22nd Special Base Force, Naval Submarine School, Kure Submarine Squadron, 6th Fleet
- Conflicts: World War II; Invasion of Sarawak; Battle of Midway

Marquis Tadashige Daigo (醍醐 忠重, Daigo Tadashige; 15 October 1891 – 6 December 1947) was a vice admiral in the Imperial Japanese Navy during World War II.

== Biography ==
Born in Chiyoda, Tokyo into the Daigo family, a kuge family of court nobility related to the Fujiwara aristocracy, Daigo was a graduate of the Gakushuin Peers' school. He went on to graduate from the 40th class of the Imperial Japanese Naval Academy in 1912. His rank on entering was only 126th out of 150 cadets, but he improved his scores, so that he graduated at 17th out of 144.

Daigo served as a midshipman on the cruiser Azuma and battleship Shikishima. As an ensign, he was assigned to the cruiser Tokiwa.

After his promotion to sub-lieutenant in 1913, he took time out to attend a session of the House of Peers as was obligatory for members of his social class. He then returned to active service on the battleship Kongō and destroyer Urakaze.

Daigo was promoted to lieutenant in 1918, and after taking courses in torpedo warfare, was assigned to submarines, serving on SS-26, and then becoming captain of SS-27, followed by SS-57. He also served on the cruiser Aso in 1924. After promotion to lieutenant commander in 1924, he was captain of Ro-64 in 1926, and chief torpedo officer on the battleship Yamashiro later the same year.

In the 1930s, Daigo was captain of a large number of cruisers in rapid succession: Yubari, Naka, Kuma, Iwate, Tokiwa, Yakumo and Ashigara. He was promoted to rear admiral on 15 November 1940.

Daigo commanded Submarine Squadron 5 (Subron 5), with his flag on the light cruiser Yura at the start of the Pacific War. At the time of the attack on Pearl Harbor, Subron 5 was covering the first wave of the Malaya Invasion Force south of the Cape of Camau, French Indochina.

On 9 December 1941, Subron 5 was ordered to pursue and sink the Royal Navy Force Z (battleship HMS Prince of Wales, battlecruiser Repulse and supporting destroyers). Although Yura received word from I-65 that the British ships were spotted, due to poor wireless reception, the signal was unclear and the British vessels were overwhelmed by torpedo bombers of the 22nd Air Flotilla from bases in Indochina before Yura and her submarines could take action.

Subron 5 was then assigned to the invasion of Sarawak from 13–26 December, covering landings in Brunei, Miri, Seria, and Kuching. The 2,500 men of the "Kawaguchi Detachment" and the No. 2 Yokosuka Special Naval Landing Force (SNLF) quickly captured Miri's airfield and oil fields. The operation was completed, and Yura returned to its base at Camranh Bay, Indochina by the end of the year.

Subron 5 was also part of the advance screening force for the Battle of Midway.

Daigo became vice admiral on 1 November 1943. He was assigned command of the Eastern Attack Group which carried out midget submarine and merchant shipping attacks on the east coast of Australia.

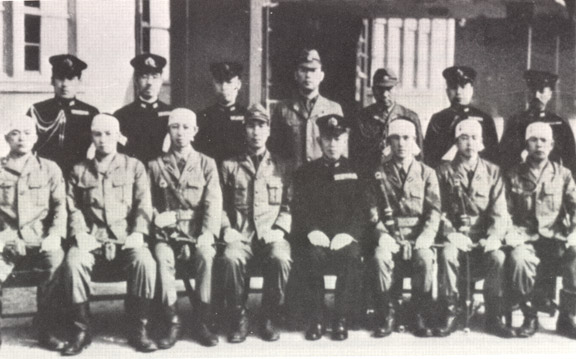
Vice Admiral Daigo (seated, in uniform) with members of his staff and kaiten pilots (wearing hachimaki) of the submarine I-36

Daigo was Commandant of the Naval Submarine School from 23 August 1944 and final Commander in Chief of the IJN 6th Fleet from 1 May 1945. During these assignments, he was involved in the kaiten human-torpedo program.

In December 1946 Daigo was arrested and imprisoned at Sugamo Prison by SCAP authorities at the request of the Netherlands government. In 1947 he was extradited to Batavia in the Dutch East Indies, where he was charged with war crimes in connection with the kidnapping, torture and massacre of 21,000 people (including women and children) by Japanese troops in Pontianak during the Pontianak incidents. These coincided with Daigo's command of the 22nd Special Base Force, headquartered in Balikpapan with responsibility for law and order in Southern-Borneo, from November 1943 to mid-August 1944. Testimony from a subordinate alleges that Daigo ordered hundreds of summary executions. A final trial was held on 22 September 1947, followed by a death sentence handed down on October 3rd. Daigo was executed by a 12 men firing squad on 6 December 1947.

At some point between March 1959 and October 1967, Daigō's name was added to the "Book of Souls" (Reiji-bo 霊璽簿) enshrined at Yasukuni Shrine; the initiative came from the temple's head priest himself, the former Prince and Marquis Fujimarō Tsukuba, who in total enshrined 983 other Class B and Class C criminals in the shrine. He died in March 1978 and was succeeded in July by Nagayoshi Matsudaira, Daigo's son-in-law, who in the following October added the names of the fourteen Japanese Class A criminals hanged in November 1948 or who died during the long Tokyo trial.

== Notable Positions Held ==
- Crewmember, BB Kongo - 1 December 1916 – 1 April 1917
- Chief Equipping Officer, SS RO-64 - 15 January 1925 – 30 April 1925
- Commanding Officer, SS RO-64 - 30 April 1925 – 1 December 1925
- Staff Officer, Yokosuka Naval District - 1 December 1925 – 1 March 1926
- ComSubDiv 9–1 December 1932 – 15 November 1933
- ComSubDiv 19–15 November 1933 – 15 November 1934
- Commanding Officer, CL Yubari - 15 November 1934 – 25 May 1935
- Commanding Officer, CL Naka - 25 May 1935 – 15 November 1935
- Commanding Officer, CL Kuma - 15 November 1935 – 1 December 1936
- Commanding Officer, CA Takao - 1 December 1936 – 3 June 1938
- Commanding Officer, CA Ashigara - 3 June 1938 – 1 December 1938
- ComSubRon 5–20 October 1941 – 10 July 1942
- Acting Commanding Officer, Kure SubRon - 31 August 1942 – 1 April 1943
- ComSubRon 11–1 April 1943 – 20 October 1943
- Commanding Officer, 22 Special Base Force - 8 November 1943 - 23 August 1943
- Principal, Kure Naval Submarine School - 23 August 1944 - 1 May 1944
- Commander-in-Chief, 6th Fleet - 1 May 1945 – 15 September 1945

== Dates of Promotion ==
- Midshipman - 17 July 1912
- Ensign - 1 December 1913
- Sublieutenant - 13 December 1915
- Lieutenant - 1 December 1918
- Lieutenant Commander - 1 December 1924
- Commander - 30 November 1929
- Captain - 15 November 1934
- Rear Admiral - 15 November 1940
- Vice Admiral - 1 November 1943

== Ancestry ==
Ancestors of Tadashige Daigo

16. Daigo Teruhisa (1760-1801)
8. Daigo Teruhiro (1791-1859)
17. Hachisuka Sachiko (1771-1838)
4. Daigo Tadaosa, 1st Marquis (1830-1900)
18. Takatsukasa Masahiro (1761-1841)
9. Takatsukasa Tatsuko (1805-1884)
2. Lord Daigo Tadayuki (1849-1899)
1. Daigo Tadashige, 2nd Marquis
