= Jami Mosque of Pontianak =

Mosque in Pontianak, West Kalimantan Indonesia

- Masjid Jami' Pontianak
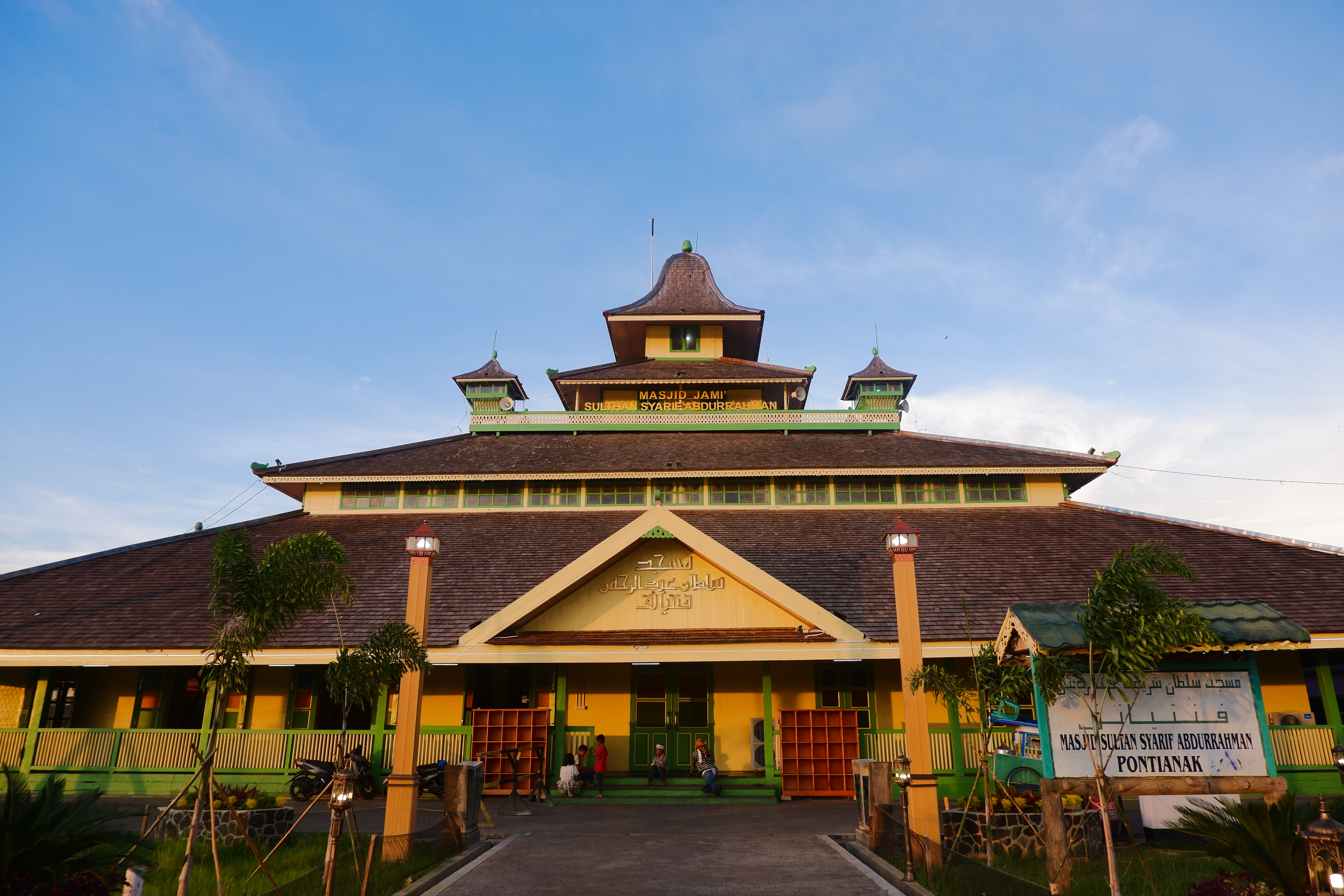

Religion
- Affiliation: Islam
- Branch/tradition: Sunni

Location
- Location: Pontianak, Kalimantan Barat, Indonesia
- Interactive map of Jami Mosque of Pontianak
- Coordinates: 0.026738°S 109.347678°E

Architecture
- Type: Mosque
- Style: Malay (with additional Middle Eastern, European and Javanese influences)
- Completed: 1827
- Capacity: 1,500

Jami Mosque of Pontianak, also known as Sultan Syarif Abdurrahman Mosque, is the oldest mosque of Pontianak, in Kalimantan, Indonesia. The large wooden mosque, together with the royal palace of Kraton Kadriyah, was among the first buildings constructed in the city following the establishment of Pontianak in 1771.

== History ==
The Jami Mosque of Pontianak was built following the founding of Pontianak by its founder, Syarif Abdurrahman Alkadrie. He was the son of al Habib Hussein, a Muslim scholar from Semarang who moved to West Kalimantan in 1733, was received by the Sultan of Matan, Kamaluddin, and then elected to be his Mufti of Religious Matters. He married the daughter of the Sultan, Nyai Tua. From this marriage, Syarif Abdurrahman Alkadrie was born.

Because of a conflict between Hussein and Sultan Kamaluddin, Hussein moved to the Mempawah Kingdom. He died in Mempawah, and so his role as a Muslim scholar was replaced by his son Alkadrie. To establish a Muslim Sultanate in Kalimantan, Alkadrie disembarked to the downstream of the river Kapuas together with his envoys of fourteen boats. Alkadrie's entourage reached the confluence of the Kapuas River and Landak River on October 23, 1771. They cleared the area near the estuary to start a new settlement. From this spot, Alkadrie founded a new Sultanate, the Pontianak Sultanate, where he established a royal palace and a royal mosque.

The original mosque was a small-sized wooden mosque topped with thatched roofs. Alkadrie died in 1808 AD, leaving a son named Sharif Usman. Sharif Usman was a child when Alkadrie's died, so he could not continue his father's sovereignty. The royal administration decided that the kingdom would be led by the brother of Syarif Abdurrahman, named Sharif Kasim. When Syarif Usman matured, he succeeded his uncle as the Sultan of Pontianak from 1822 to 1855. Syarif Usman rebuilt the mosque in the month of Muharram year 1827. At its completion, he named it Abdurrahman Mosque as a tribute to his father.

== Architecture ==
In a typical feature of Indonesian mosques, the mosque consists of main posts (saka guru) which supported the multi-tiered roofs. These main posts numbered six and was created out of belian wood, a type of high-quality hardwood native to the island.

The most prominent feature of the mosque is its multi-tiered pyramidal roofs. There are three tiers of roofs, topped with the fourth tier in the form of a bell-shaped cupola. Glass windows provide light into the interior between the lowest and second-lowest tier. On the upper terrace situated above the second-lowest tier, four rooms or gardu topped with cupolas acted as a kind of finials on the upper ridges of the second roof-tier. A six-sided cupola roofed the mihrab of the mosque. The roof is covered in shingles made of belian pieces.

In the typical architecture of West Kalimantan, the mosque is built over a wooden platform, a common feature of river settlements in West Kalimantan. This stage is approximately 50 centimetres (20 in) high above the ground. Today, a cement base improves the stability of the mosque.

== See also ==
- List of mosques in Indonesia

== Cited works ==
- Zein, Abdul Baqir (1999). Masjid-masjid bersejarah di Indonesia. Gema Insani. ISBN 979561567X.
