= Pontianak Sultanate =

State in Indonesia, 1950–1771

Pontianak Kadriyah Sultanate کسلطانن قدريه ڤنتيانق Kesultanan Kadriyah Pontianak
- 1771–1950
- Flag Coat of arms
- Status: Part of the Dutch East Indies (from 1779)
- Capital: Pontianak
- Common languages: Malay
- Religion: Sunni Islam
- Government: Islamic absolute Monarchy
- Sultan
  - 1778-1808: Sultan Syarif Abdurrahman Alkadrie
  - 1945-1978: Sultan Syarif Hamid II Alkadrie
  - 2017-present: Sultan Syarif Machmud Melvin Alkadrie
- History
  - Established: 23 October 1771
  - Coronation: 1 September 1778
  - Integration with Indonesia: 17 August 1950
  - Disestablished: 1950
Preceded by	Succeeded by
Tanjungpura Kingdom; Mempawah Kingdom	Indonesia

The Pontianak Kadriyah Sultanate (Jawi: کسلطانن قدرية ڤنتيانق ) was a Arab-Malay state that existed on the western coast of the island of Borneo from the late 18th century until its disestablishment in 1950. It was founded in 1771 by Sultan Syarif Abdurrahman Ibni Alhabib Husein bin Ahmad Alkadrie, a descendant of Husayn ibn Ali, in the area of the mouth of the triple junction of the small Kapuas River and the porcupine river which included a small area ceded by the Sultan of Banten to the Dutch VOC. He had two political marriages in Kalimantan, the first to the princess of the Mempawah Kingdom, Utin Chandramidi, and the second in 1768 to Ratu Syahranum (Ratoe Sarib Anom) of the Banjar Sultanate (daughter or brother of Sultan Saat/Sulaiman Saidullah I), earning him the title Pangeran Nur Alam.

The sultanate was located at the mouth of the Kapuas River in what is today the Indonesian province of West Kalimantan, and the sultan's residential palace was situated in what later grew to become the modern-day Indonesian city of Pontianak.

== History ==
=== Founding ===
The Pontianak Sultanate was founded in 1771 by explorers from Hadhramaut led by al-Sayyid Syarif Abdurrahman al-Kadrie, a son of a Hadramaut Arab cleric from the Mempawah Kingdom and descendant of Imam Ali al-Uraidhi ibn Ja'far al-Sadiq, on Wednesday, 23 October 1771 (14 Rajab 1185 H) which was marked by clearing the forest at the junction of the Landak River, Kapuas Kecil River, and Kapuas Besar River to build a hall and house as a residence. He had two political marriages in Kalimantan, first with the daughter of Panembahan Mempawah and then with the daughter of the sultan of Banjar.

In 1778 (1192 AH), Syarif Abdurrahman was confirmed as the Sultan of Pontianak. The location of the centre of government is marked by the establishment of the Jami Mosque of Pontianak (also named Sultan Syarif Abdurrahman Mosque) and Kadariyah Palace which is now located in Dalam Bugis Village, East Pontianak District, Pontianak City, West Kalimantan.

=== Colonial period ===
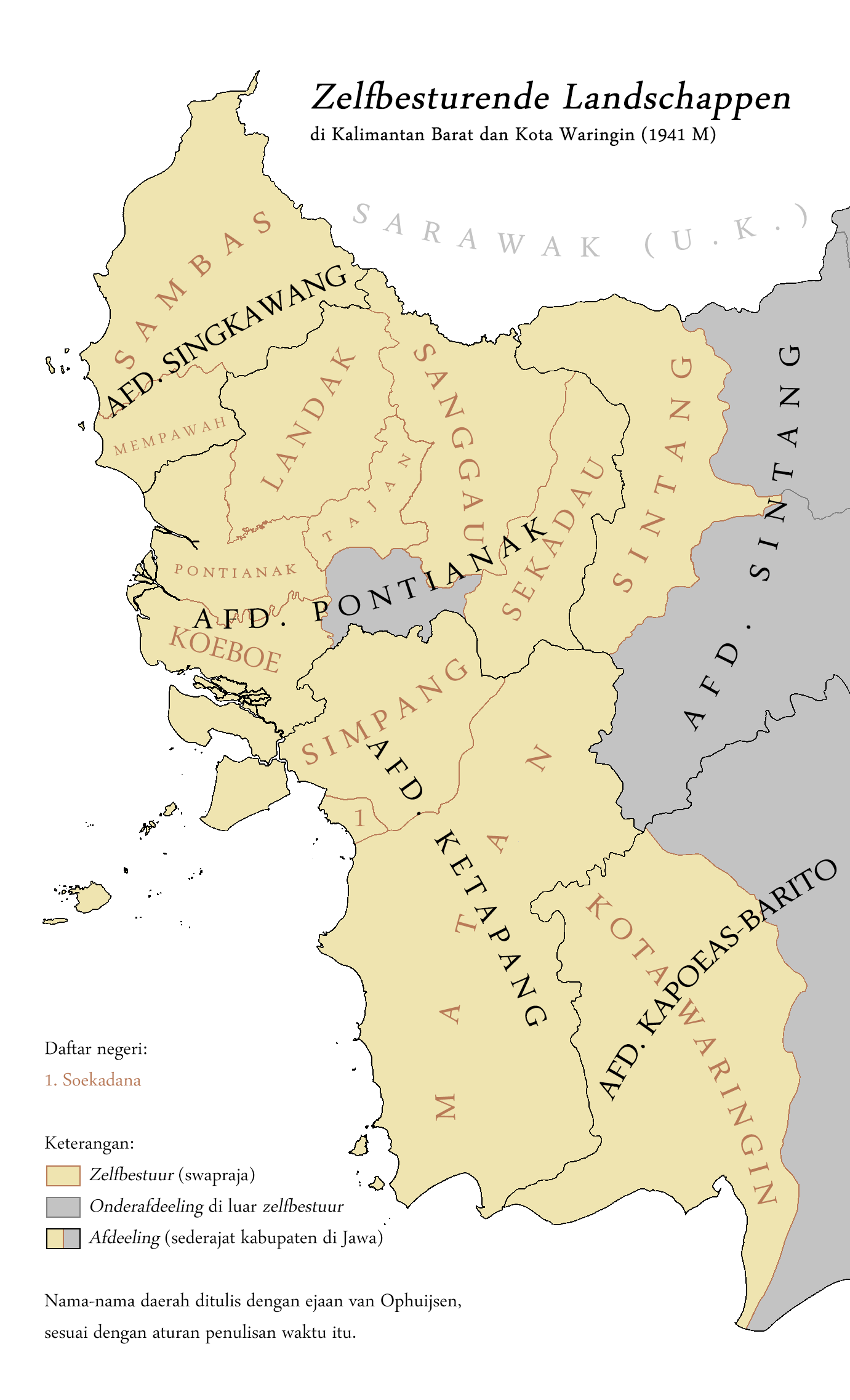
Zelfbestuur territories in West and Central Kalimantan, including Pontianak, 1941.

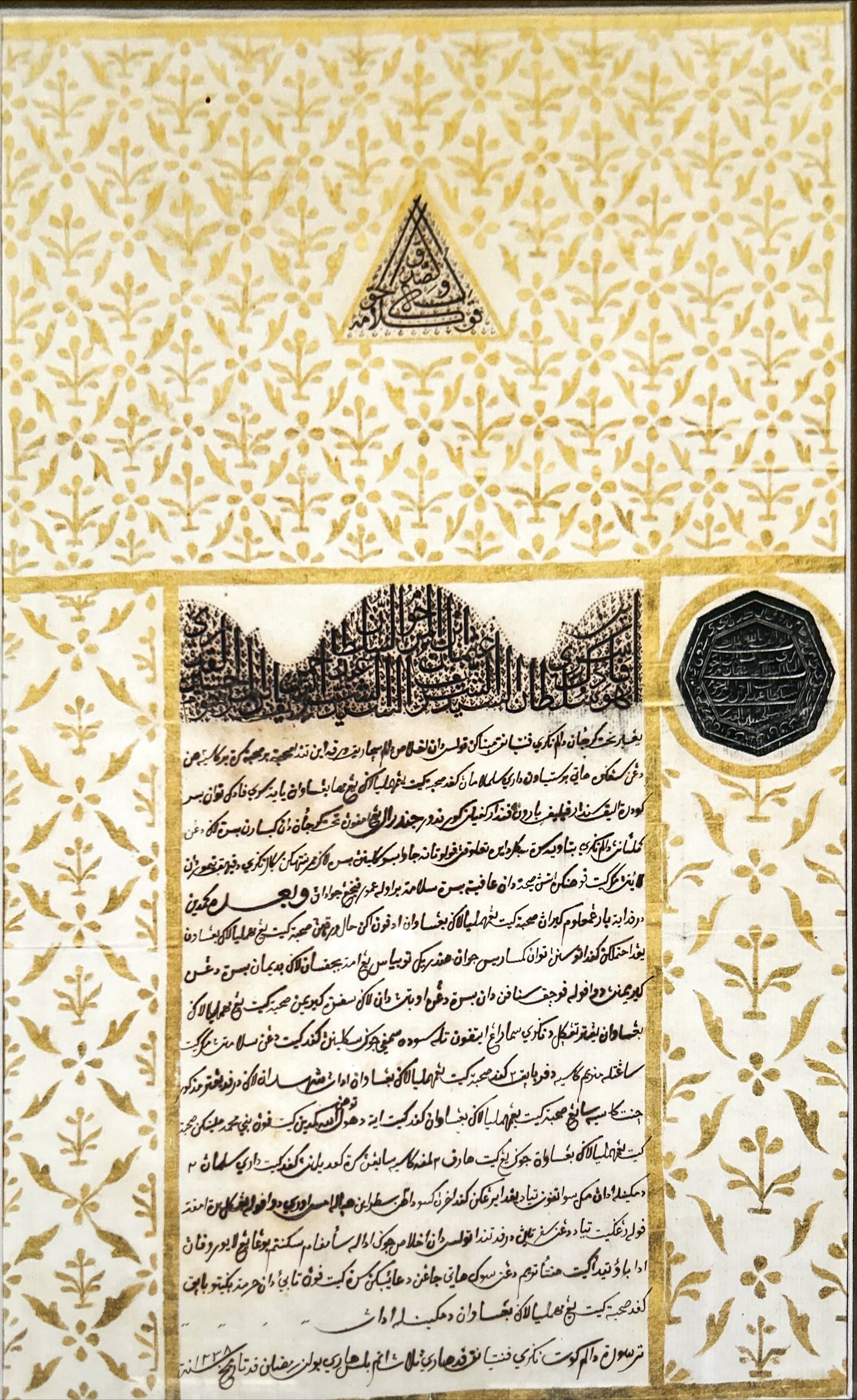
Syarif Usman Alkadrie's letter to VOC Commissioner General Van der Capellen (1823)

In 1778, Dutch colonialists from Batavia entered Pontianak led by Willem Adriaan Palm. The sultan gave permission to the Dutch to occupy the area opposite the sultanate palace, now known as Tanah Seribu or Verkendepaal. Palm was later replaced by Wolter Markus Stuart who acted as Resident van Borneo's Wester Afdeling I (1779-1784) with a seat in Pontianak. Initially, Sultan Syarif Abdurrahman Alkadrie refused the offer of co-operation with foreigners. But after the envoy came for the second time, Syarif accepted the Dutch as a commonwealth partner with open arms.

On 5 July 1779, the Dutch made an agreement with the Sultan regarding the inhabitants of Tanah Seribu so that it could be used as an area of Dutch activities which later became the seat of government of the Regional Head of the West Borneo Prefecture (Resident het Hoofd Westeraffieling van Borneo) and the Assistant Resident Head of Pontianak Regency (Asistent Resident het Hoofd der Affleeling van Pontianak). This area later became Controleur het Hoofd Onderafdeeling van Pontianak or Hoofd Plaatselijk Bestuur van Pontianak. After the explorers arrived in Pontianak, they established the Kadariah Palace and received endorsement as the sultan of Pontianak by the Dutch East India Company in 1779.

In 1808, Sultan Syarif Abdurrahman died. He was buried in Batu Layang, Pontianak. Subsequently, Syarif Kasim Alkadrie (1808-1819) ascended the throne to become Sultan of Pontianak in place of his father. Under the reign of Sultan Syarif Kasim, the Pontianak Sultanate further strengthened its cooperation with the Dutch Kingdom and later the neighboring British since 1811.

After Sultan Syarif Kasim died on 25 February 1819, Syarif Usman Alkadrie (1819-1855) ascended the throne as Sultan of Pontianak. During the reign of Sultan Syarif Usman, many beneficial policies were issued by him, including by continuing the construction project of the Jami' Mosque in 1821 and the expansion of Kadriyah Palace in 1855. In April 1855, Sultan Syarif Usman gave up his position as sultan and later died in 1860.

Sultan Syarif Usman's eldest son, Syarif Hamid Alkadrie (1855-1872), was then crowned Sultan of Pontianak on 12 April 1855. And when Sultan Syarif Hamid died in 1872, his eldest son, Syarif Yusuf Alkadrie (1872-1895) ascended the throne after a few months of his father's death. Sultan Syarif Yusuf is known as the only sultan who interfered the least in government affairs. He was more active in the religious field, as well as concurrently spreading Islam.

Sultan Sharif Yusuf's reign ended on 15 March 1895. He was succeeded by his son, Syarif Muhammad Alkadrie (1895-1944) who was crowned Sultan of Pontianak on 6 August 1895. During this period, the Pontianak Sultanate's co-operative relationship with the Dutch became closer and stronger. The reign of Sultan Syarif Muhammad was the longest reign in the history of Pontianak Sultanate. He was very instrumental in encouraging renewal and modernisation in Pontianak. In the social and cultural fields, he was the first Malay sultan in West Kalimantan to dress in European regalia in addition to Malay clothing, Teluk Belanga, as official clothing. He was also the one who supported the advancement of education and health. In addition, he also encouraged the entry of European and Chinese private capital, and supported the Malays and Chinese to develop rubber, coconut and copra plantations and the coconut oil industry in Pontianak. In the political aspect, the Sultan facilitated the establishment and development of political organisations, both by sultanate relatives and community leaders.

The Pontianak Sultanate had friendly relations with the Lanfang Republic.

=== Japanese occupation ===
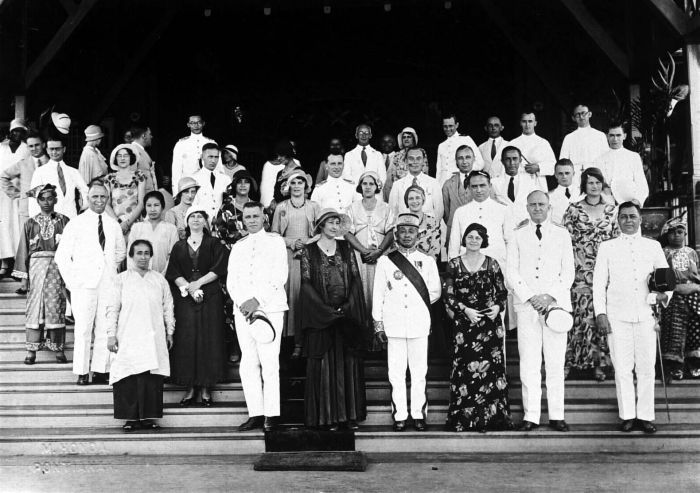
Sultan Syarif Muhammad Alkadrie and guests (circa 1930)

The era of Sultan Syarif Muhammad's reign faded quickly with the arrival of the Imperial Japanese army to Pontianak in 1942. On 24 January 1944, considered rebellious and allied with the Dutch, the Japanese destroyed the Pontianak Sultanate and several Malay sultanates in West Kalimantan.

The Japanese had actually suspected that in West Kalimantan there were plots consisting of scholars, nobles, kings, sultans, community leaders, Chinese people, and officials. So they took the initiative to crush them with arrests. These arrests took place between September 1943 and early 1944. Not only making arrests, the Japanese also tortured and mass murdered thousands of residents of Pontianak and its surroundings. On 28 June 1944, the Japanese killed Sultan Syarif Muhammad along with several family members and relatives of the sultanate, traditional leaders, scholars, and community leaders of Pontianak. Two of his sons were also beheaded by the Japanese. The same fate also befell other kings and sultans and communities in West Kalimantan. This bloody tragedy became known as the Mandor Incident. The murder of Sultan Syarif Muhammad and the arbitrary actions of the Japanese were one of the main factors in the Dayak Desa War.

The body of Sultan Syarif Muhammad was only found in 1946 by his son named Syarif Hamid Alkadrie. Syarif Hamid survived the genocide because he was not in Pontianak. At that time he had been a Japanese prisoner of war in Batavia since 1942 and was released in 1945.

=== After the proclamation of independence ===
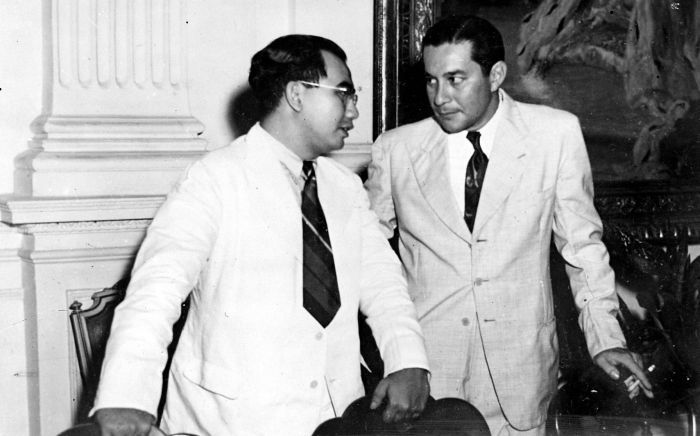
Sultan Hamid II in conversation with Ida Anak Agung Gde Agung, King of Gianyar (circa 1949)

The last sultan was Syarif Hamid Alkadrie, who was interned by the occupying Japanese forces, returned to Pontianak and was crowned Sultan of Pontianak (1945-1978) on 29 October 1945 with the title Sultan Syarif Hamid II, or better known as Sultan Hamid II.

After the Proclamation of Indonesian Independence in 1945, at the initiative of Sultan Hamid II, the Pontianak Sultanate and the Malay sultanates in West Kalimantan joined the Republic of Indonesia. He supported the federal state of RIS. During this time Sultan Hamid II served as President of the State of West Kalimantan (Head of the Special Region of West Kalimantan) from 1947-1950. Sultan Hamid II designed the national emblem of indonesia, Garuda Pancasila, and adopted it as the national emblem of Indonesia. Besides being the Chairman of the Federal Consultative Assembly (Bijeenkomst voor Federaal Overleg / BFO) in 1949, he was also Minister of State Zonder Porto Folio in the Cabinet of the United Republic of Indonesia.

On 28 October 1946, the Civil Government of the Dutch East Indies as the Council of West Borneo formed the Special Region of West Kalimantan and was granted the status of Special Region on 12 May 1947. The Special Region of West Kalimantan included the monarchies (swapraja) in West Kalimantan, including the Pontianak Sultanate. At that time, Sultan Hamid II was appointed as the Head of the Special Region of West Kalimantan. Prior to 5 April 1950, the Special Region of West Kalimantan joined the Republic of Indonesia (RIS). The area then became part of the Administrative Province of Kalimantan. After the dissolution of the Republic of Indonesia on 17 August 1950, the Pontianak Sultanate area became part of West Kalimantan Province. He was deposed when he was involved in a coup d'état attempt of APRA led by Raymond Westerling.

After Sultan Hamid II died on 30 March 1978, there was a vacancy in the position of sultan in the Paontianak Sultanate family. The vacancy lasted for 25 years. However, on 15 January 2004, the Kadriyah Palace nobles appointed Syarif Abubakar Alkadrie as the 8th Sultan of Pontianak. Long before that, on 29 January 2001 a senior noble, Syarifah Khadijah Alkadrie bint Sultan Syarif Muhammad Alkadrie bin Sultan Syarif Yusuf Alkadrie, inaugurated the Kadriyah Palace Young Relatives of the Pontianak Sultanate. This kinship aims to maintain all Pontianak Malay cultural traditions and values, including reviving and preserving them.

== List of sultans of Pontianak ==
Sultan of Pontianak
- Royal Coat of arms

Details
- First monarch: Syarif Abdurrahman Alkadrie
- Last monarch: Syarif Machmud Alkadrie
- Formed: 23 October 1771
- Residence: Kadriyah Palace
- Appointer: Hereditary

Photo	Sultan	Reign
1	Syarif Abdurrahman Alkadrie	1771–1808
2	Syarif Kasim Alkadrie	1808–1819
3	Syarif Osman Alkadrie	1819–1855
4	Syarif Hamid I Alkadrie	1855–1872
5	Syarif Yusuf Alkadrie	1872–1895
6	Syarif Muhammad Alkadrie	1895–1944
7	Syarif Hamid II Alkadrie (Sultan Hamid II)	1945–1978
8	Syarif Abubakar Alkadrie	2004–2017
9	Syarif Machmud Alkadrie	2017–present

=== Family Tree ===
Alkadrie Dynasty

Abdurrahman; Sultan of Pontianak r. 1771-1808; 1729/30-1808
Osman; Sultan of Pontianak r. 1819-1855	Kasim; Sultan of Pontianak r. 1808-1819
Hamid I Sultan of Pontianak r. 1855-1872
Yusuf; Sultan of Pontianak r. 1872-1895
Muhammad; Sultan of Pontianak r. 1895-1944
Hamid II; Sultan of Pontianak r. 1945-1978; 1913-1978	Syarif Mahmud
Abubakar; Sultan of Pontianak r. 2004-2017; 1944-2017
Machmud; Sultan of Pontianak r. 2017-present
