= Dayak Desa War =

1945–1948 war in Indonesia

- Part of the Resistance during World War II (until 31 August 1945) and the Indonesian National Revolution (from 1945 to 1948)
| Date | 1945–1948 |
| Location | West Kalimantan |
| Result | Dayak Tribe victory |

Belligerents
| Japan (Note: until 1945); Netherlands (Note: from 1945) | Dayak Desa tribe (Note: until 1945) (Indonesia) Angkatan Perang Majang Desa (Note: from 1945) |

Commanders and leaders
| Lieutenant Nagatani † | Pang Suma †; Pang Linggan |

The Dayak Desa War or Majang Desa War was an armed uprising by the Dayak Desa tribe in West Kalimantan against the Japanese Empire during World War II, and shortly thereafter by Indonesian nationalists against the Dutch East Indies. The war was initially caused by the local population's opposition against the rōmusha system and disappointment with Japanese occupation (which was initially thought to be liberation from European rule). In the initial phase of Japanese occupation, several Japanese companies entered the region to gain natural resources in order to support the Japanese war effort in the Pacific. Occupying Japanese forced locals to work for free for these companies, mainly in coal mining and timber production. After that, a Japanese foreman working in a company wanted to marry the daughter of Pang Linggan, a respected Dayak chief in the region, which caused more tension between locals and the Japanese. Dayak tribes in the region initiated mangkuk merah (red bowl) ritual, as a sign to mobilise men from villages and prepare for war. The Japanese were driven out of the Borneo interior in June 1945, but returned on 17 July and continued until 31 August 1945 when Japanese forces there surrendered and left the region, replaced by Allied forces including the Dutch, who would later be opposed again until recognition of Indonesian independence in 1949.

== Background ==
Japanese forces landed in Pontianak, West Kalimantan on 19 December 1941 and quickly overran Dutch defenses in the region. By late December, interior towns and cities such as Putussibau and Sanggau fell into Japanese control. With the fall of Banjarmasin, a major city of Dutch Borneo, in 1942, the Japanese assumed control over the entire island. During the war and subsequent occupation, the flow of goods in and out of the island was disrupted, causing widespread starvation. Mass forced labour and poor working conditions caused deaths of native workers and created discontent among the local population. Most of the labourers, numbering around 80,000, worked in timber or mining. The situation became worse on 13 May 1945, when a Japanese man named Osaki, a foreman of a timber company in the region, intended to marry a Dayak girl, who was a daughter of Pang Linggan, a respected Dayak chief in the village of Sekucing Labai. Osaki threatened to kill Pang Linggan and Pang Linggan soon reported his behaviour to the village chief (tumenggung), Pang Dadan. At first, Pang Linggan was willing to resolve the problem with discussion mediated by other village elders such as Pang Dadan and Pang Suma. However, Osaki attacked Pang Linggan and got himself into a fight, and was killed by Pang Linggan. Elsewhere, workers of the Japanese timber company Sumitomo Shokusan Kabushiki Kaisan rioted after not receiving salaries. After the riot was suppressed, Japanese foremen put the workers under tight surveillance. Another Japanese foreman, Yamamoto, got into fight with Pang Rontoi, another village chief who sided with the workers.

== Armed uprising ==
=== During Japanese occupation ===
As tensions rose, Dayak tribes from Ketapang to Sekadau initiated the mangkuk merah (red bowl) ritual as a symbol of hostility to the Japanese and as a message to mobilize men from villages. Workers from Sumitomo Shokusan Kabushiki Kaisan also joined the uprising, and massacred several Japanese foremen and officials, with Pang Suma as the leader of the uprising. As the news of the uprising reached Pontianak, the Japanese sent an expeditionary force led by Lieutenant Nagatani. Nagatani's force, however, failed to capture the town of Meliau in Sanggau and his force was massacred on 24 June 1945. Nagatani was killed in action and beheaded.

The town of Meliau remained under Dayak control until 17 July 1945, when another Japanese force advanced on the town. Pang Suma ordered some of his men to defend the town together with four other chief elders. The Japanese won the battle, and Pang Suma was killed and Pang Linggan mortally wounded in it. The town would remain under Japanese control until 31 August 1945.

=== Continuation against return of Dutch rule ===
After receiving news of the proclamation of Indonesian independence on 24 August 1945, surviving fighters from the uprising formed the Angkatan Perang Majang Desa (lit: "Majang Desa Armed Force") with the aim of opposing the return of Dutch rule. The newly-organized men from the Dayak Desa war collaborated with Indonesian nationalist guerillas in the region during the Kalimantan Physical Revolution. The group occasionally raided Pontianak between 1945 and 1948. On 1946, the town of Bengkayang was occupied briefly by Indonesian nationalists. However, nationalist uprisings in West Kalimantan were largely suppressed and mostly stopped by 1948. The Dutch attempted to create an autonomous West Kalimantan state under the United States of Indonesia. Independence was recognized in 1949 and autonomous states were absorbed into the modern country of Indonesia, and many Dayaks joined the new republican government, filling a power vacuum left by a lack of Malay rulers who formerly ruled the region and were killed by the Japanese during the Pontianak incidents.

== Legacy ==
Pang Suma is regarded by Indonesians as a hero, and several places and roads are named after him. Local politicians and military officers often visit his grave to pay respects. Among places named after Pang Suma are Pangsuma Airport in Kapuas Hulu Regency and a sports complex Pangsuma in Pontianak. A weather station in Kalimantan operated by Indonesia's Meteorology, Climatology, and Geophysical Agency was named Pangsuma Meteorology Station. A monument named after him was built in Meliau.

On 30 July 1981, families of those involved in the Dayak Desa war returned five skulls of Japanese soldiers in coordination with the Japanese embassy in Indonesia back to the soldiers' families in Japan. The remains included those of Lieutenant Nagatani, as well as a katana that belonged to him.
