= List of kongsi =

The kongsi federations of West Borneo were Chinese autonomous entities that conducted the mining of gold, and later expanded to other fields of business, based mainly in the Monterado and Mandor areas. The region never unified into one kongsi federation, and rather was a conglomeration of small kongsi organizations that mainly pledged to two zongting (assembly halls): the Heshun Confederation and Lanfang Republic in Montrado and Mandor, respectively. The following is a list of all mentioned kongsis and general Chinese organizations that we have from existing records and later Dutch accounts.

== Kongsis before the formation of Heshun (mid-18th century – 1776) ==
=== Organizations mentioned in the Chronicle of the Lanfang Kongsi ===
The ''Chronicle of the Lanfang Kongsi'' details the first clan-based organizations that existed in Borneo, around the mid-18th century. Four were documented:

- Shanxin Jinhu 山心金湖 (Shanxin gold-lake)
- Jusheng kongsi 聚勝公司 (Jusheng kongsi)
- Sida Jiawei 四大家围 (Four Great Families)
- Lanheying 兰和营 (Lanhe guild)

*Note that "clan-based organizations" was a very general term, as there appeared to be many names for these fraternities, including the aforementioned hui, but also jinhu 金湖, jiawei 家围, shansha 山沙, bali 把坜 and fen 分. Even though one of the mentioned organizations has the kongsi 公司 suffix, it is uncertain if any of these organizations had the full capacities of the standard kongsi that will become the norm later in history.

=== Non-mining related organizations ===
Chinese organizations were not limited to mining. Other groups of Chinese, either connected by similar beliefs or occupations, created similar organizations, also called hui. There were two recorded:

- Tiandihui (Thien-Thi-Foei) 天地會- The Heaven and Earth Society, an anti-Qing secretive folk organization, found its way among the merchants and farmers of West Borneo. They existed separately from the mining kongsis and harassed the miners, and was one of the reasons the Heshun Confederation was created. They lost influence following the initial wars waged between them and the Heshun Confederation.
- Lanfanghui (Lan-Fong-Foei) 蘭芳會- A separate association that can be considered to have a connection with the Tiandihui. They were recorded to have a settlement near Kulor, before being kicked out after they attempted to conquer the city's Teochew merchants. Here, they moved south to Mandor, where Luo Fangbo rose to its leader and reformed it into the Lanfang kongsi.

== Kongsis during their height (1776–1840) ==
=== Montrado Region ===
Order	Pinyin	Hakka Dialect	English meaning
01 [H]	Dagang kongsi (大港公司)	Thai-Kong, Thai-kwong kongsi	Large river
02 [H]	Xin Bafen kongsi (新八分公司)	Sin-Pat-Foen, Sien-pak-foen kongsi	New eight shares
03 [H]	Shiwufen kongsi (十五分公司)	Sjip-Ng-Foen, Sjip-ung-foen kongsi	Fifteen shares
04 [H]	Lao Bafen kongsi (老八分公司)	Lo-Pat-Foen kongsi	Old eight shares
05 [H]	Santiaogou kongsi / Sanda futing (三條溝公司/三達副廳)	Sam-Thiao-Keoe kongsi	Three gullies / Three reaches deputy hall
06 [H]	Taihe, Shiliufen kongsi (泰和公司/十六分公司)	Thai-Fo, Sjip-Lioek-Foen kongsi	Great harmony / Sixteen shares
07 [H]	Jiufentou kongsi (九分頭公司)	Kioe-Foen-Theoe kongsi	Old nine shares
08 [H]	Manhe kongsi (滿和公司)	Man-Fo kongsi	Full harmony
09 [H]	Lao Shisifen kongsi (老十四分公司)	Lo-Sjip-Foen kongsi	Old fourteen shares
10 [H]	Shisanfen kongsi (十三分公司)	Sjip-Sam-Foen kongsi	Thirteen shares
11 [H]	Xinwu, Xin Shisifen kongsi (新屋公司/新十四分公司)	Sin-Woek, Sien-Woek kongsi	New house / New fourteen shares
12 [H]	Shi'erfen or Dayi kongsi (十二分公司/大義公司)	Sjip-Ngi-Foen or Thai-Ngi kongsi	Twelve shares / Great righteousness
13 [H]	Jielian kongsi (結連公司)	Kiet-Lien kongsi	Union
14 [H]	Kengwei kongsi (坑尾公司)	Hang-Moei kongsi	End of the pit
15	Jinhe kongsi (金和公司)	Kim-fo-kong-si	Golden harmony
16	Guanghe kongsi (廣和公司)	Kong-fo-kong-si	Wide harmony
17	Liufentou kongsi (六分头公司)	Lioek-Foen-Theoe kongsi	Six shares
18	Dasheng kongsi (大盛公司)	Thai-Sjin kongsi	Most abundant
19	Heshun zongting (和順總廳)	Fo-Sjoen-Tsoeng-Thang	Harmonious profit

=== Lara Region ===
Order	Pinyin	Hakka Dialect	English meaning
01	Yuanhe kongsi (元和公司)	Njan-fo-kong-si	First harmony
02	Zanhe kongsi (贊和公司)	Tshan-fo-kong-si	Supporting harmony
03	Yinghe kongsi (應和公司)	Djin-fo-kong-si	True harmony
04	Huihe kongsi (惠和公司)	Soeng-fo-kong-si	Favorable harmony
05	Shenghe kongsi (升和公司)	Sjin-fo-kong-si	Rising harmony
06	Shuanghe kongsi (雙和公司)	Soeng-fo-kong-si	Double harmony
07	Xiawu kongsi / Xi Santiaogou kongsi (下屋公司/細三條溝公司)	Ha-woek-kong-si, Klein-sam-thiao-keoe-kong-si	Lower harmony, Thin (Little) Santiaogou

=== Budok Region ===
Order	Pinyin	Hakka Dialect	English meaning
01	Lintian or Xinle kongsi (霖田/新樂公司)	Lim-Thian or Sin-Lok kongsi	Misty fields

=== Mandor Region ===
Order	Pinyin	Hakka Dialect	English meaning
01	Lanfang kongsi (蘭芳公司)	Lan-Fong kongsi	Sweet orchids

*[H] denotes a member of the Heshun / Fosjoen zongting. Italicized kongsis denote privatized mines, some of whom were called "kongsi".

Other minor kongsis with little to no information included: the Dahong kongsi (打洪公司), He’an kongsi (和安公司), Jusheng kongsi (聚勝公司), and the Mianyuan kongsi (綿遠公司).

== Post-autonomous period (1850–1900) ==
Following the destruction of the Dagang kongsi, and with association, the Heshun zongting, the Chinese attempted to reorganize into a new movement. The Jiulong kongsi (Kioe-lioeng-kong-si) 九龍公司, as it was called, they harassed Dutch soldiers. In 1854, they burned down Montrado, the former Heshun capital, and attempted to reorganize before they were caught and executed. The movement lasted less than a year.

Yet another secret organization resurfaced, from the ancient remnants of the Tiandihui. The Sandianhui (Sam-Tiam-Foei) 三點會, which the Dutch called the Three Fingered Society, aimed instead for general civil obedience and elimination of pro-Dutch Chinese. Unlike the Jiulong kongsi, the Sandianhui were able to extend their reach and cause disturbances to the new Dutch occupied West Borneo.
