= Lintian Republic =

The Lintian Republic (Chinese: 霖田公司, Hakka/Dutch: Lim-Thian; "Misty fields company"), known post-1850 as Xinle Republic (Chinese: 新樂公司, Hakka/Dutch: Xim-Lok; "New happiness company") was an autonomous Chinese kongsi federation located in Budok (Chinese: 烏落, Hakka: Boedok), Lembah Bawang kecamatan, Bengkayang Regency of West Kalimantan, Indonesia. It joined the Heshun Confederation in 1850 and was dissolved in 1854 at the hands of the Dutch East Indies.

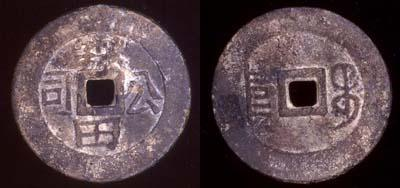
Pre-1850 coin circulated among the Lintian kongsi. The front says in Chinese 霖田公司 "Lintian kongsi", while the back has an unknown Manchu legend (possibly a corruption of the words "boo ciowan", the mark of the Ministry of Revenue mint in Beijing)

== Demographics ==
Early on, settlers in Lintian were mainly banshanke ("half-mountain Hakkas"), a bilingual group that spoke both Hakka and Hokkien, all exclusively from the Jiexi County. In fact, Lintian was named so after a temple in Jieyang, a city of Jiexi County, the Jieyang Lintian ancestral temple (揭阳霖田祖庙), dedicated to the Sanshan Guowang (Lords of the Three Mountains). Indeed, the Sanshan Guowang cult also played a very important role in the Lintian overseas community; its own branch temple in Budok was founded in the 1780s, and became the center of Lintian's activity. Thus, the Lintian kongsi was an example of a kaixiang kongsi 开香公司 (lit. "open incense kongsi"), or a kongsi who can trace its roots back to a temple cult organization in mainland China. The members of Lintian kongsi bore the surnames of Zhang 张, Cai 蔡, Liu 刘, and Huang 黄.

== History ==
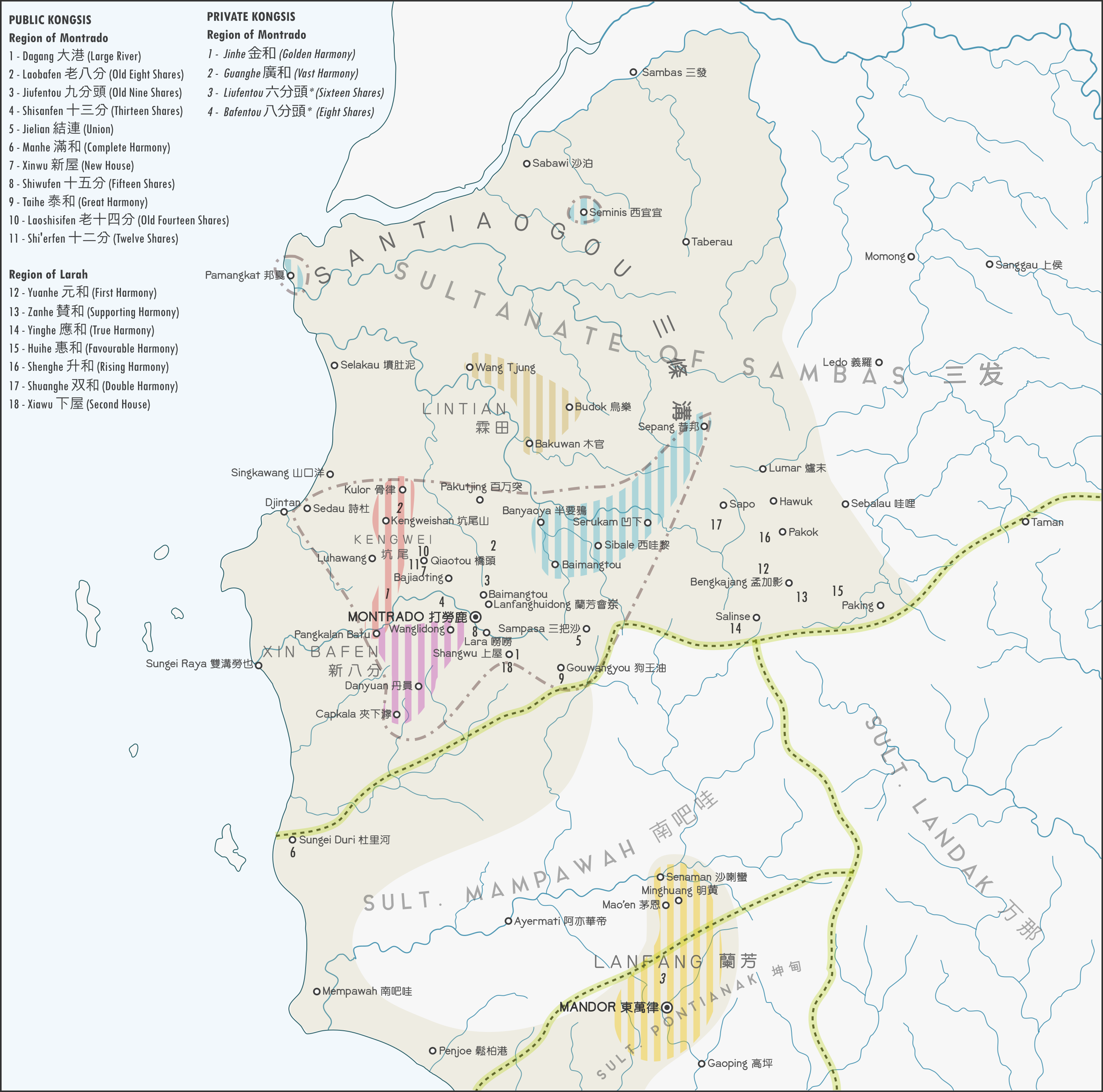
Map of Kongsi republics in West Borneo

The Lintian Republic in dark green Other Kongsis in light green

Lintian kongsi's early history is very obscure, and kongsi was also absent during the founding of the Heshun zongting (assembly hall) in 1776 for unknown reasons. However, they maintained agreeable relationships with the Heshun, and remained a uninfluential but independent polity until the 1850s. During the 1823 treaty headed under J. H. Tobias in which the Chinese kongsi recognized the Dutch administration over them, Lintian's seal was present. As the Dagang kongsi of Heshun began absorbing the other smaller kongsis, only the Lintian and Shiwufen kongsi of Lumar, out of all the small kongsis, survived.

In 1851, Budok and Lumar was reported to have been attacked by hostile Dayaks, who massacred the members of the Lintian kongsi and cut off contact between Budok and the larger Chinese settlement of Montrado. When the larger Dagang kongsi came to liberate the miners at Budok, the kongsi leader of Lintian accused the Santiaogou Federation (another powerful kongsi that was the enemy of Dagang) of orchestrating the attack. It is later revealed that the sultan of Sambas, the overlords of the Chinese kongsis, feared an attack of the hostile Dagang on the capital of Sambas, and called on the Dayaks to attack the Chinese villages (provided they were not with the Santiaogou, who were their ally). These attacks were so brutal that both Lintian and Shiwufen kongsi hastily allied with the Dagang, whom before they pledged neutrality between Dagang and Santiaogou's conflicts.

Later that year, after Dagang had attacked the Dutch and were forced to neogotiate peace terms, the Lintian also signed the treaty, which affirmed full Dutch subjugation of the Chinese kongsis. The Dutch now wielded the power to appoint representatives of Lintian, along with Dagang and Shiwufen. The Lintian kongsi was also commended for their loyalty during the Willer Conferences of 1853, and were officially subdivisions of the Heshun zongting. Lastly, as all the remaining kongsis had to change their name, Lintian's name was henceforth referred to as Xinle (新樂).

When the Dagang kongsi refused to meet the demands of the Willer Conferences in early 1854, an expedition against the Dagang was conducted by Willer. Following the Dagang's defeat once again, the Dutch argued the Dagang ought to be eradicated and Budok dissociated from Dagang and placed under a separate government. After the Dutch occupied Singkawang, a hotspot for Chinese rebellious activity, the Lintian kongsi sent a representative to offer their full submission. Finally, the July decree against the kongsi declared Heshun will be officially dissolved, and Budok will be administered by government-appointed officers. Budok's miners will also have to leave West Borneo, or be condemned to hard labor and exile. Thus, along with other kongsis of Montrado, the Lintian/Xinle kongsi was abolished in July 1854.
