= Luo Fangbo =

Chinese politician (1738–1795)

- 羅芳伯
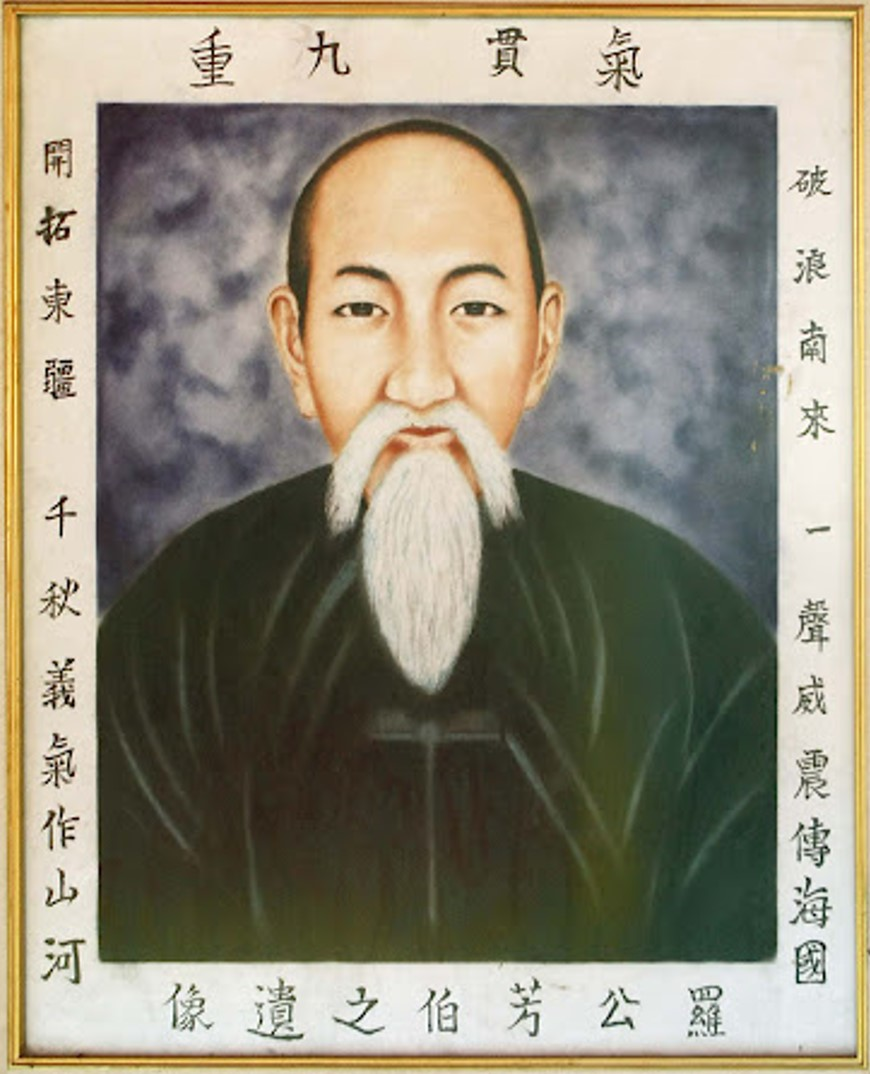

President of the Lanfang Republic
- In office 1777–1795
- Preceded by: None (established position)
- Succeeded by: Jiang Wubo

Personal details
- Born: 1738 Meixian, Guangdong, Qing dynasty
- Died: 1795 (aged 56–57) Khuntien, West Kalimantan

Chinese name
- Chinese: 羅芳伯
Transcriptions
Standard Mandarin
- Hanyu Pinyin: Luófāng bó
- Wade–Giles: Lo^{2}-fang^{1} po^{2}
Hakka
- Pha̍k-fa-sṳ: Lò Fông-phek

Luo Fangbo (Chinese: 羅芳伯; pinyin: Luófāng bó; Jyutping: lo4 fong1 baak3; Dutch: De thaiko Lo Fong-phak; Indonesian: Lo Fang Pak, 1738-1795), formerly known as Lo Fong Pak, was born in Sak-san-po, Guangdong Province. He was the first Chinese person to hold the government position of 'president' and the founding father of the Lanfang Republic.

== Early life ==
Luo Fangbo, was born into a family of farmers and students in Meixian Shifan Town, Guangdong, with the birthname of Luo Fong Pak. As a teenager, he was described as generous and especially joyful about marriage. From a young age, he learnt literature and martial arts, earning recognition among his friends. He tried to study various subjects and practiced swordsmanship, while also trying to master farming and livestock management. Known for his ambition and diligence, the townspeople held him in high regard. Until he was 34 years old, Luo Fangbo was still a poor scholar in Jiaying Prefecture who was not appreciated for his talent for scholarly acts and "lived by working hard in the fields with his tongue and writing with his inkstone for a living."

=== Southern Crossing ===
In 1772 (the 37th year of the Qianlong reign in the Qing Dynasty), Luo Fangbo had failed in the rural examination (鄉試) at 35 Years old. Luo Fangbo's Confucian beliefs and ambitions led him to seek a life beyond the countryside. Unwilling to spend his life confined to rural life, he "harboured the ambition to travel with great vigour" and sailed with more than a hundred relatives and friends to Borneo via Humen. Luo also wrote a poem entitled "The Journey to Jinshan" to recount the event. This drive for exploration and achievement is captured in Xie Fusheng's "Meixian Essentials," which notes his desire to cross the sea in search of greater opportunities. After multiple storms, he landed in Sanfa, Borneo.

At that time, Borneo was already inhabited by many Chinese. At the beginning, Luo Fangbo made a living in Kundian in the west with the career of teaching. He actively contacted local Chinese and indigenous people and began to use his innate communication skills. Luo Fangbo, who had just arrived, was immediately respected by the Hakka community because of his knowledge of literature and his decisiveness in doing things. He was known as "Luo Fangkou." By the time when he arrived in Dongwanlu (東萬律), modern-day Pontianak, he enjoyed high prestige among the Chinese in the Pontianak area and was elected as the leader by the local clansmen's associations. Thus establishing the Lan Fang Hui, an organization dedicated to protecting Chinese communities in businesses. Its main opponent was the Tiandihui and after many battles, the Tiandihui was destroyed, and the Lan Fang Hui grew stronger. He also had "one hundred and eight like-minded people" and began to try to make achievements. For his administrative skills, high cultural background, courage, Confucian education, and knowledge of martial arts, he was not only able to unite the Chinese, but also able to co-operate with the natives, and was very popular with the natives as well as the overseas Chinese. Later, in 1777, the reputation of the subordinate Luo Fangbo gradually surpassed that of Wu Yuansheng of the "Jusheng Company." Wu Yuansheng was a Jiaying native and bandit who fled to Borneo Island for plotting to launch an uprising against the Qing government. Due to this mass popularity, Luo Fangbo became Wu Yuansheng's superior and thus leader of the "Jusheng Company." Luo Fangbo then reestablished the company under the name, "Lanfang Company."

However, at that time, more than seven mining companies were fighting with each other in Borneo. Social order on the island was extremely chaotic as bandits were rampant and pirates dominated, causing the people to live in poverty while the indigenous leaders were helpless. In response, Luo Fangbo first united the Chinese and organized a "fellow countrymen association" (同乡会) where he assembled and personally trained guards in martial arts and arms to secure positions and fend off wrongdoers. Word later spread of an impending armed invasion of Borneo by the Dutch East India Company in Java. Luo Fangbo actively contacted the indigenous leaders of Sultan and the local people to set up an army combining the Chinese and the local people, which defeated the Dutch army twice and gained the jurisdiction of East Borneo. Leading a force of more than 30,000 troops, Luo Fangbo joined forces with the Sultan, believed to be from the Sultanate of Sambas, to pacify the rebellion. During the battle, Luo Fangbo's outstanding organizational skills and brave fighting spirit made his companions admire him and unanimously elected him as the leader. The Sultan prepared a banquet to celebrate the victory. Wen Xiongfei once wrote;

"The Yue natives sought to rebel, the Sultan prepared for the military expenses, bequeathed to Luo Fangbo to conquer. Phuong Bo is used in the open, secretly set up, the fruit of a great victory, the natives were killed and wounded. The sultan was pleased to get the report, and made wine and music, for Fangbo's birthday. From the table, the drink lifted up and said, 'There is a big trouble in our family. We are brothers. We will never forget each other from generation to generation. Fang Boweizhi.'"

=== Family and genealogy ===
According to the Luo genealogy, Luo Fangbo's (also known as Luo Fangbai) ancestors, from southern Jiangxi to Jiaying Prefecture (now Meixian District); after five generations, and then relocated to Shishan Town to open the residence and establish a business. From the founding ancestor of Luo Jiucheng to Luo Fangbo, after fourteen generations. Luo Fangbo's father Luo Qilong (the 13th ancestor), his wife Yang, gave birth to three sons Fangbai, Kuibai, and Taibai. Luo Fangbo had a younger brother named Luo Zhenbo. Luo Fangbo's first wife, Li, gave birth to a son Luo Zizeng (the 15th generation). Luo Zizeng married Guo and gave birth to sons Yuanhan and Yuanheng, the 16th generation, who are the descendants of Luo Fangbo left in Shishan. It is found that Luo Zizeng never went to Pontianak with his father, as there were little to no mention of Luo Zizeng in records in Pontianak. After Luo Fangbo pacified Dongwanlu, he married an indigenous person of Dayak ethnicity. It is not known whether Luo Fangbo's second wife gave birth to any children due to the lack of information. Throughout the ages, the Luo family has been engaged in farming and studying, and some of them have also been engaged in farming and trading. Luo Fangbo's Indonesian lineage however remains mostly a mystery, with many that connects lineages to Luo Fangbo scattered across Southeast Asia.

== Establishment of Langfang ==
Later, in the lower reaches of the Kapuas River, there was a native tribal chief who often separated the unity of the natives and the Chinese. When the tribesmen living downstream of the Kapuas River insulted the Chinese, Luo Fangbo's subordinate Wu Yuansheng led an army to quell them and went southward. Whist traveling south, the Kun Tien, also known as the Pontianak sultanate, was newly established after its leader, Syarif Abdurrahman Al Qadri had left the Kingdom of Mempawah to found his own Kingdom who was supported by the Dutch VOC. Luo Fangbo, who was skilled in diplomacy and seeking an opportunity, liaised with the newly created and weak Sultanate of Pontianak to fight against the Chinese bandits and rebellious Kongsis' in the east and the west together. With cooperation, they both won great victory. The sultan of Pontianak, Syarif Abdurrahman Alkadrie, realised that he was no match for the tribesmen and could not control them, so he split the land into separate territories, to which Luo Fangbo was given control over the land of Dongwanlu as a sign of gratitude and a way to administer the land much more effectively. The land under Luo Fangbo's jurisdiction was bounded by Molor in the east, Kapuas River in the west, Dayuan (also known as Daiyan Tayan, today's upper and lower Daiyan Townships in Shanghou regency), Shanghou and Sekadau in the south, and Lara and Singkawang in the north.

Luo Fangbo's alliance with the Pontianak Sultanate had brought great returns as in 1789, the Pontianak Sultanate with the help of the Dutch succeeded in capturing the territory of the Mempawah Sultanate, supported by Luo Fangbo. Initially persuaded by the Dutch, the Pontianak sultanate tried to build a palace on the fringes of the Mempawah kingdom's border on the upper reaches of the river. Dispute over the authority of the river and vagueness over the border eventually led to a war between the two. Historian Musni Umberan, suggested that Luo Fangbo himself persuaded Syarif Abdurrahman to attack Mempawah which at the time was led by Syarif Abdurrahman's own brother-in-law, namely Gusti Daeng Jamiril. The Mempawah Sultan lost the war and joined forces with the Dayak to counter-attack. Luo Fangbo again broke the Mempawah Sultan's power and was pushed further north to Singkawang, ending with the Sultan of Singkawang (possibly referring to the Sultanate of Sambas) and the Mempawah Sultan signing a peace treaty with Luo Fangbo mediated by the Sultanate of Pontianak after a siege lasting 9 months. Soon after, at 57 years old, Luo Fangbo's popularity soared dramatically. As a result, since 1793, the Sultan of Pontianak gave Luo Fangbo even broader authority to manage the Chinese kongsi under his management. It is also said that the Sultan wasn't able to resist Luo Fangbo's military, so the Sultan himself sought protection from Luo Fangbo to ensure the longevity of the newborn nation. After that, the people, and the Chinese in the area joined Luo Fangbo to seek refuge and work for him.

Lanfang's Presidential Flag

Inspired by the success of Heshun Confederation in negotiations with the local sultan through unified organization, Luo Fangbo began to establish a republican self-government with Dongwanlu Town (modern-day Mandor) as the capital. Later renaming the Langfang company to the Lanfang Republic after successfully uniting 14 Kongsis'. In 1777, he organized the "Lanfang Grand General System" and introduced the Lan Phuong New Year. The people unanimously supported him and referred to him as the "Chief of the Tang Dynasty" (大唐總長), later bestowing upon him the noble title of 'Bo'. As a result, he was no longer known as Lo Fong Pak but as Luo Fangbo. In 1941, historian Luo Xianglin noted that since the establishment of the Lanfang Grand General System, Fangbo's prestige, both internally and externally, could have led him to proclaim himself as the chief leader or King. WIth many wanting Luo Fangbo becoming the status of King or a Sultan. However, Fangbo remained humble, choosing to refer to himself as the headman (President), which reflected the spirit of people's rule. In addition to the Lan Fang General Administration, the Dai Yan Kingdom was also established. This kingdom was established purely for General Wu Yuansheng, where he ruled as a feudal state. The Lanfang system was one of the earliest attempts to establish a democratic system of government in Southeast Asia. It featured a general office at the top, supported by officials at all levels. Luo Fangbo organized local self-governing bodies and appointed overseas Chinese and native chiefs as heads of these bodies. The governance was virtuous and well received by the local populace. The land in Dongwanlu was fertile, suitable for farming and herding. The region also had mountains, forests, gold mines, and abundant resources, along with harbors and bays that facilitated the development of transport. During his reign, taking from what he learned back home, he led the people to improve farming techniques, expand mineral mining, develop transport businesses, roads, establish schools, and improve the material and cultural life of the people. To safeguard the area's security, he implemented military training for all people. He organized the young and strong to participate in military training, and they worked as laborers, farmers, and merchants in normal times, assembling to fight in times of war. He also set up an arsenal to manufacture guns, and built strong defenses. When Lanfang was annexed by the Dutch colonial empire in 1884, the "Grand General System" created by Luo Fangbo had elected 12 governors over its 108-year existence in Kalimantan.

=== Expelling crocodiles and political tenure ===
Soon after the establishment of the Lanfang Republic, a crocodile crisis broke out in the country. Groups of crocodiles were moving in Lanfang's domestic waters, with rampant activities, and from time to time, they boarded the shore to devour people and animals, which made the people extremely alarmed and disturbed, and seriously jeopardised the safety of the people's lives and properties. Upon receiving the news, Luo Fangbo immediately travelled to the affected area in person and commanded the people to expel the crocodiles successfully. At that time, Luo Fangbo designed to secretly bring people to poison and ambush bows and arrows on the crocodile gathering point on the one hand, and on the other hand, he also followed the method of Han Yu's crocodile sacrifice in Chaozhou, set up the sacrificial table, read the sacrificial text, and ordered the crocodile to "leave the country immediately." It is said that the local "crocodile problem" was eliminated before long. The local natives and overseas Chinese admired Luo Fangbo's crocodile cure and regarded him as an extraordinary person with magical ability. Later Luo Fangbo occupied a gold-producing area of dozens of miles in the north and south, centred on Mando, and appointed himself as the supreme head of the Mando General Office, the governing body of the area, thus establishing an internally self-governing Chinese community. He implemented independent laws and regulations in the area, collected taxes on his own, put troops in the people's hands, and vigorously supported the development of mining, agriculture, transport, culture and education. Under the governance of Luo Fangbo, the Mando region practised a high degree of autonomy and established a semi-independent republican political region. He tried to secure vassalship to the Qing Dynasty and sent emissaries to meet the Qianlong Emperor, requesting to become a vassal state, hoping to incorporate the land of West Borneo into the Qing territory or turn it into a vassal state. Much to the dismay of Luo Fangbo, Emperor Qianlong did not took interest of the "abandoned people of the Celestial Empire" and did not recognize the country established by Southeast Asian Chinese. However, this did deterred the Dutch from raiding Lanfang for 108 years, as they believed Lanfang was a tributary state of the Qing Dynasty.

== Final years ==
On 8 June 1793, The Times, published in London, reported on the first page of the "Lanfang Company", stating: "The marvellous contribution of Lafontaine, the head of the Republic of the Grand Master of Lanfang, that is, Lofangbo, is in the organic liaison with the Sultan of Borneo, the coordination of the various ethnic groups, and the implementation of the primitive Athenian republican institutions. The economy also developed on a large scale. Although the power of the state was behind the western countries, its significance was no less than that of 1787. Its significance is no less than the democratic and republican direction of the United States of America, where Washington was elected as the first President in 1787 and the Union was realized..." For one final time, Luo Fangbo returned to his hometown in Sishan to visit his relatives. He brought back a bag of gold jewelry and distributed it to the villagers. He had also invited his close friend, Xie Qinggao to witness his good deeds back in Borneo, to which he later wrote a book about the journey. 19 years after the establishment of the "Lan Fang Da General System" and the second year after Luo Fangbo had calmed down the riots in Xingang and had worked for the cause for nearly 20 years, passed away at the age of 58 due to illness In 1795. Prior to his passing there is a story that in 1794, Luo Fangbo once sent a man named Huang Anba from Zhenping, Guangdong, to purchase food with the gold and silver jewelry donated by Luo Fangbo's wife. Huang Anba actually ran away with the money. Luo Fangbo swore that: "From now on, the position of "elder" of Lan Fang can only be succeeded by someone from Jiaying Prefecture, and the deputy leader will be taken over by someone from Dapu. The positions of headman, 'tail brother', and 'old lady' in other places are not limited to the region." On his deathbed, he told his people. He left his will: "Choose the wise and appoint them." He also said, "I have drifted overseas and got what I have today, which is the gift of all the brothers, I dare not be selfish with the land. As a guest elder, I will only guard the land and wait for the wise," so he recommended Jiang Wubo (江戊伯), who had meritorious achievements and excellent martial arts skills, to succeed him.

== Selected works ==
Luo Fangbo is the earliest known author of Chinese ekphrasis in Indonesia, and his major works include "Ode to the Golden Mountain" (金山赋), "Dispel Anguish" (遣怀), and "Crocodile Writings" (鳄鱼文). He also wrote poems and stories during his tenure such like "Three Years of Suppressing the Barbarians and Bandits" (平蛮荡寇经三载) and "Sacrificial Offering to the Gods to Drive Away the Crocodiles" (祭诸神驱鳄文).

== Legacy ==
=== In China ===
The Hai Lu (Sea Records), written in 1820, was authored by Xie Qinggao, a traveller and navigator of the Qing Dynasty, who was known as China's "Marco Polo". In the article "Kun Dian Guo" in the volume of "Hai Lu", it was said that Luo Fangbo was a man of "great chivalry and is good at fighting." Xie had personally visited the place, but some scholars believe that the article is not Xie's own memoirs, but may be a collection of information excerpted by the author from newspapers or recorded conversations of others.

In 1905, Chinese politician Liang Qichao published "Chinese Colonial Eight Great Men Biography" in the 63rd issue of the "Xinmin Congbao." Luo Fangbo was listed as one of the eight great men of China's overseas colonial history. In an era of crisis when China faced invasion and oppression from Western powers, this publication promoted China's history of foreign exchanges and celebrated grand historical events and heroes. The aim was to invigorate the spirit of the nation and inspire countrymen to promote the fine traditions of pioneering and enterprising to revitalize the country. Since then, Luo Fangbo and the Lanfang Republic began to gradually come into the vision of the general public in China and it is generally believed that this history has been known to the people in China since then.

Some scholars also wrote books to celebrate the achievements of Luo Fangbo in establishing the Lanfang Republic. As early as the famous Hakka historian Luo Xianglin wrote a book entitled "The Republic of West Borneo built by Luo Fangbo", in which he examined the life of Luo Fangbo and the rise and fall of the Lanfang Republic, and enthusiastically praised this once-existing Chinese self-governance as a "Republic of Full Sovereignty". He wrote: "Those who speak of democracy and republicanism in recent times say that this system originated in the United States, and has been practised in France recently, without knowing that their forefathers also acted in the same way." As well as returned overseas writers Zhang Yonghe, Zhang Kaiyuan from western Fujian Province wrote a new book-length biography of Luo Fangbo. These works have brought the history of the Lanfang Republic back to the public's eyes. In 2004, a hundred Indonesian experts, scholars and local celebrities formed a special propaganda team to travel thousands of miles to commemorate the history of the Lanfang Republic.

On 19 December 2015, the memorial hall of Luo Fangbo's former residence was inaugurated and opened in his hometown in the Meixian District, Meizhou City, Guangdong Province, The memorial hall of Luo Fangbo's former residence has five exhibition halls (rooms), which introduce Luo Fangbo's life performance and the history of the Lanfang Republic through the combination of graphics and text, respectively.

On 13 March 2020, Luo Fangbo's former residence was announced by the Meizhou Municipal People's Government as one of the seventh batch of Meizhou Municipal Cultural Relics Protection Units (serial number 15).

In 27 February 2022, Luo Fangbo Memorial Park was formally inaugurated and opened, with plaques describing Luo Fangbo's exploits in Southeast Asia, serving the dual functions of commemorating history and recreation.

=== Outside and in Indonesia ===
In addition to his high reputation in Borneo, Luo Fangbo's influence in Southeast Asia was also far-reaching. In Southeast Asia, it is said that many overseas Chinese leaders and local politicians admire Luo Fangbo in high regard. Such like Singapore's founding Prime Minister Lee Kuan Yew, often simply compared himself to Luo Fangbo, and is thought to have descended from Langfang Hakkas'. Former President of Indonesia, Abdulrahman Wahid, once remarked about Luo Fangbo, comparing him and George Washington. Stating that "in 1787, Washington was elected as the first President of the United States of America, realizing the federation and establishing a republican system. However, the leader of our Hakka region, Law Fong Poh, established the republican system of the 'Lan Fong Grand General System' in 1776 in East Borneo (present-day West Kalimantan), the third largest island in the world, 10 years before the United States. In terms of this historical contribution, Lo Fang Pak is no less than Washington. Lo Fang Pak is one of the world's great men alongside Washington."

In Pontianak, Indonesia, there is a commemorative institution named "Lan Fang Public School." Additionally, there are memorial halls and cemeteries dedicated to him in Pontianak, along with various temples. In these memorials, a couplet that is commonly displayed in these temples reads, "Hundreds of battles to occupy rivers and mountains, to overturn the earth and the sky, one can imagine his spirit in those days; three chapters abide by the law, the classics and the military, the crown and etiquette of the old country are still preserved." The stone tombstone in the cemetery records his remarkable achievements. Every year on the ninth day of the second month of the lunar calendar, Luo Fangbo's birthday, people gather for a tomb sacrificial ceremony. The local community holds Luo Fangbo in high esteem, commemorating him in various temples, many located in the Pontianak area in his honor. On his birthday and the anniversary of his death (the second day of the ninth month of the lunar calendar), locals consistently visit these temples to pay tribute to him. The most infamous of which is Klenteng Lo Fang Pak, located in Sungai Purun Besar, Sungai Pinyuh Sub-district, Mempawah, Pontianak. The original structure survived for 107 years before being destroyed by the Dutch during their capture of Pontianak. Resident Cornelis Kater desecrated Lanfang's deities by removing the effigy of the kongsi's patron god Guan Di and the tablets of Luo Fangbo from the kongsi headquarters. Infuriated, followers of Luo Fangbo, ethnic Chinese, and some allying Dayaks' led a massive uprising under the name of the Third Kongsi War that ended only in September 1885. At some point parts of the Klenteng was rebuilt by his followers and thus continued in use for approximately more than 281 years in Sungai Purun Kecil Village.

On 24 March 2018, the ribbon-cutting ceremony to commemorate the 280th anniversary of the birth of Luo Fangbo and the opening of Lanfang Garden was held in Mandor (Dongwanlu), Wana Regency, West Kalimantan Province, Indonesia. In order to commemorate the Lan Fang Republic, a Chinese independent regime founded by Luo Fang Bo in East Wanlue in that year, the organisers named Luo Fang Bo's cemetery Lan Fang Yuan. In November, in collaboration between China and Indonesia that same year, a monograph on Luo Fangbo was released.
