= Kengwei Republic =

Chinese kongsi federation in Borneo (–1839)

The Kengwei Republic (Chinese: 坑尾公司, Hakka/Dutch: Hang-Moei; "End of the Pit Company") was an autonomous Chinese kongsi federation that associated with Monterado (Chinese: 打勞鹿, Hakka: Montradok), a district in Bengkayang Regency, West Kalimantan, Borneo, but operated mainly in territories west of Montrado. It joined the Heshun Confederation in 1776 and was dissolved in 1839 at the hands of the Dagang Republic.

== History ==
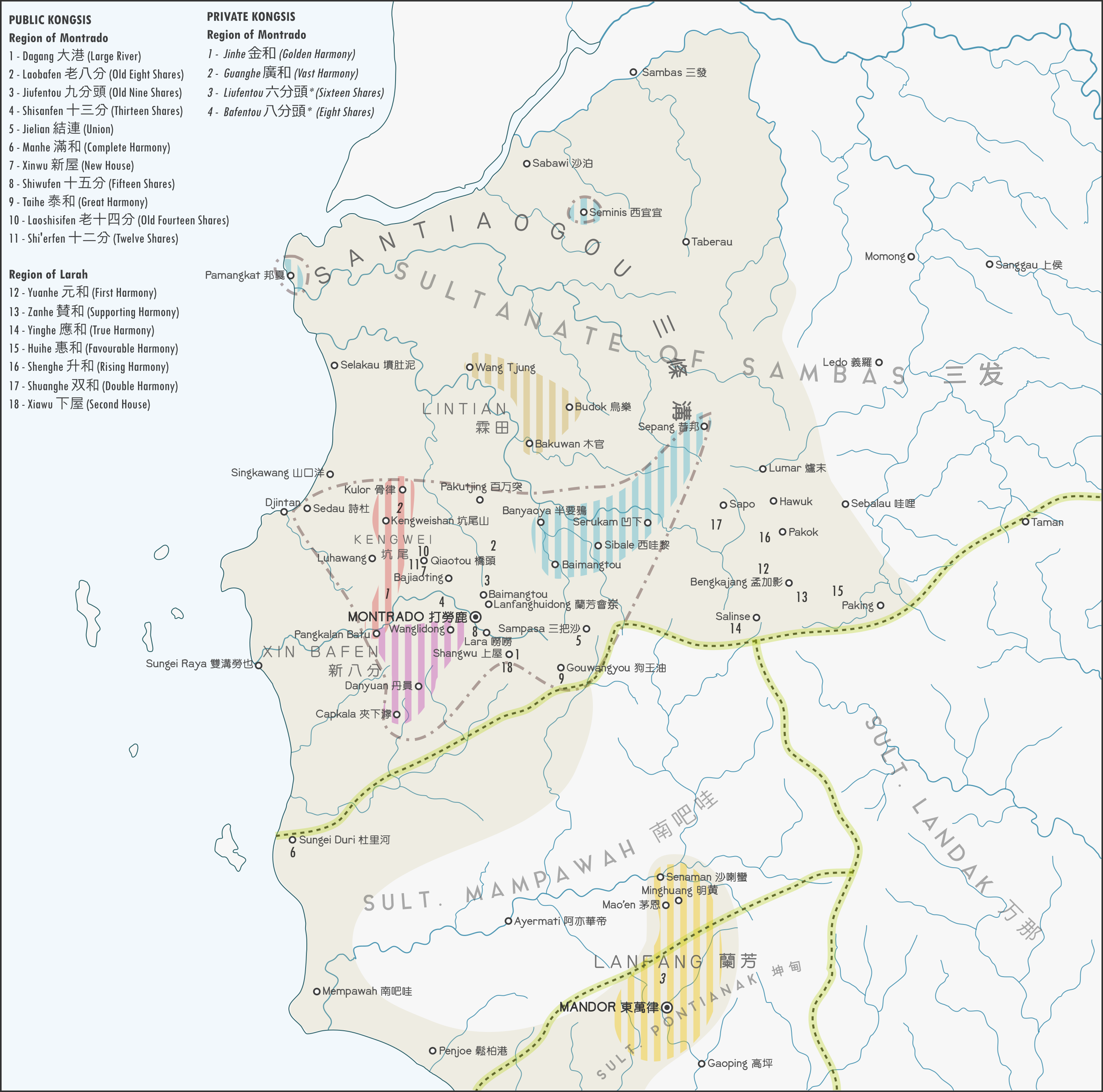
Map of Kongsi republics in West Borneo with Kengwei Republic in red stripe fill. The extent of the Heshun Confederation outlined by the tan dash-dot line.

The Kengwei Republic in dark green Other Kongsis in light green

Records document that the members of the Kengwei kongsi came mainly from Guishan (Koei-sjan) in Huizhou Prefecture (Foei-tsjioe), Guangdong Province. They were moderately powerful, having mines that operated in Pangkalan Batu (Chinese: 祭下港, Hakka: Pangkalan-Batoe), Luxiaheng (Chinese: 路下橫, Hakka: Loehawang), Kulor (Chinese: 骨律, Hakka: Koelor), and the Kengweishan (Chinese: 坑尾山, Hakka: Hang-moei-san), a hill named after the kongsi. When they joined the Heshun Confederation in 1776, the Kengwei also owned two privatized mines, the Jinhe 金和 and Guanghe 廣和 kongsis. Both old Larah-based kongsis can be traced back to Macao. Like many of the other Montrado-based kongsis, they had a strong affiliation to the Huizhou branch of the Tua Pek Kong (Thai-pak-koeng) cult. It is recorded that a Dabogong temple was present in Larah, which was controlled by Kengwei. In 1777, Luo Fangbo, the founder of the Lanfang Republic, passed through the territory of Kengwei kongsi in Kengweishan to escape from rival organizations before they recruited troops to found the aforementioned republic in Mandor.

In 1807, during the first internal quarrels of the Heshun Confederation, Kengwei joined the side of Dagang, the most powerful kongsi in Heshun, in fighting the Jielian Republic over a water reservoir and had even convinced the Xinwu kongsi to come to Dagang's side. When Xin Bafen was eliminated in 1808 by Dagang, Kengwei took some of the land of Xin Bafen and then that of Shisanfen, which soon dissolved. In 1814, when Liu Guibo of the Xinwu ascended as president of the Heshun, he attempted to integrate Xinwu with Kengwei to create a third powerful bloc in the confederation, the others being Dagang and Samtiaokioe (Santiaogou). The move was met with so much outcry that Guibo was forced to resign after ten days.

In 1818, when the Dutch-appointed magistrate G. Muller informed the Chinese kongsi they were now Dutch subjects, Kengwei's representative was present during the conference. During the 1823 treaty by J. H. Tobias in which the Chinese kongsi recognized the Dutch administration, Kengwei's seal was present as well.

=== Kengwei-Dagang Conflict (1837–1839) ===
With the Dutch retreating from West Bornean affairs, Dagang and Kengwei's relationship deteriorated considerably. In 1836, Kengwei, along with its ally Xiawu, conspired to build a new mine and water reservoir around Kulor before the Dagang can, in the face of exhaustion of mining sites. Wen Guanshou, now the president of Heshun from Dagang, found out about the plot and told Kengwei that they had to destroy the mine and the reservoir to avoid trouble.

After Kengwei and Xiawu sent their delegations to Dagang to defend themselves, they were promptly arrested and a meeting date was decided later, and guards were sent to station at Pangkalan Batu. Tensions heightened when the Shiwufen kongsi house burned down, and Kengwei and Xiawu were accused of causing it. Guanshou attempted to mediate by releasing the prisoners but forgot to recall the guards at Pangkalan Batu, who killed the delegation when they arrived.

That was the last straw for the two kongsis. A letter was sent to the Kengwei and Xiawu miners in Larah that told them to flee to Lanfang in the middle of the night. The miners rallied around Kengwei's clerk, one Wu Jinlai and did not know that he was already in association with the Dagang. There, he fled to join the Dagang kongsi, who marched to Xiawu and found the Kengwei had abandoned the kongsi.

As Dagang celebrated its victory, Xiawu send a contingent of men to the Sambas sultan and requested land to be opened in Baluo to allow them to settle there, away from the pressure of Dagang. The sultan agreed, and a plot of land was opened up near Baluo, near present-day Tayan. In 1839, 700 men and women packed and left. Dagang absorbed the former lands of the Kengwei and Xiawu and told those who remained that they were welcome as members of Dagang. That ended the Kengwei kongsi.
