= Expedition to the West Coast of Borneo =

Dutch-Kongsi war (1823)

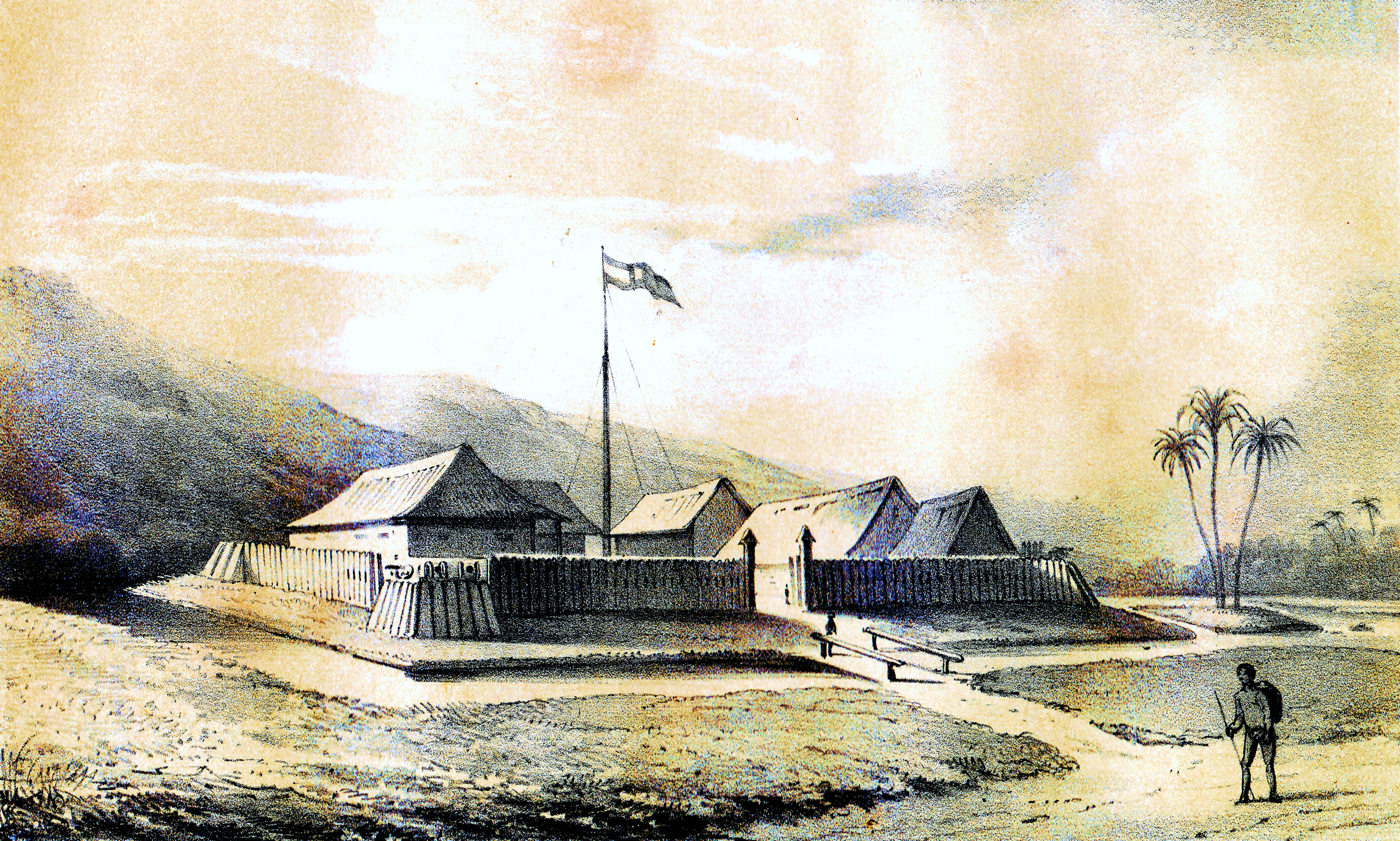
- Dutch fort in Sambas, built in 1823.
Date	1823
Location	Pontianak, Mandor, and Monterado
Result	Dutch victory; Rebellion suppressed

Belligerents
Netherlands	Kongsi republics Chinese Borneo rebels

Strength
Unknown	Unknown

Casualties and losses
Unknown	Unknown

The Expedition to the West Coast of Borneo was a punitive expedition of the Royal Netherlands East Indies Army against the Chinese people of Borneo independence republic at Pontianak, Mandor, and Monterado in 1823.

== Sources ==
- 1900. W.A. Terwogt. Het land van Jan Pieterszoon Coen. Geschiedenis van de Nederlanders in oost-Indië. P. Geerts. Hoorn
- 1900. G. Kepper. Wapenfeiten van het Nederlands Indische Leger; 1816–1900. M.M. Cuvee, Den Haag.'
- 1876. A.J.A. Gerlach. Nederlandse heldenfeiten in Oost Indë. Drie delen. Gebroeders Belinfante, Den Haag.
