= Lanfang Republic =

1777–1884 Qing tributary state in western Borneo

Lanfang Republic 蘭芳共和國 (Chinese)
- 1777–1884
- Reconstructed flag (Note: "...The flag is a rectangle yellow flag with the word Lan Fang Ta Tong Chi. The president flag is a triangular yellow flag with the word Chuao (General)..." Quoted from the web as a summary from the book Hakka people - Jews of the Orient by Kao Chung Xi.)

- National seal: 蘭芳公司

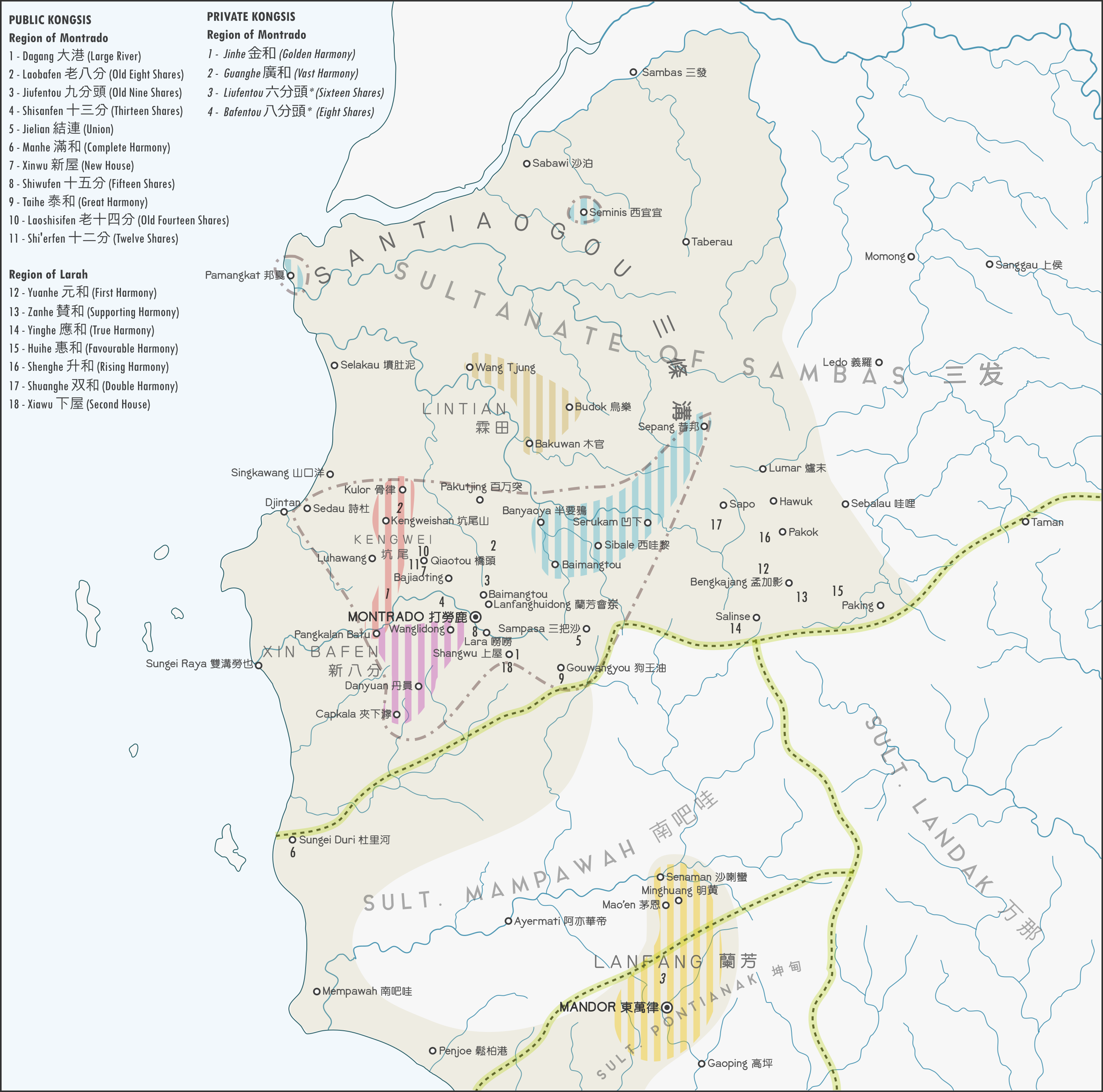
- The Lanfang Republic in dark green Other Kongsis in light green
- Status: Kongsi federation under Sultanate of Pontianak and Mempawah; Qing tributary
- Capital: Dōng Wàn Lǜ (東萬律) (now Mandor)
- Common languages: Hakka, Malay, Dayak languages
- Demonym: Hakka or Lánfāngrén (蘭芳人)
- Government: Presidential kongsi republic
- President
  - 1777–1795: Luo Fangbo
  - 1795–1799: Jiang Wubo
  - 1799–1804: Yan Sibo
  - 1804–1811: Jiang Wubo
  - 1811–1823: Song Chabo
  - 1823–1838: Liu Taiji
  - 1838–1842: Gu Liubo
  - 1842–1843: Xie Guifang
  - 1843–1845: Ye Tenghui
  - 1845–1848: Liu Ganxing
  - 1848–1876: Liu Asheng
  - 1876–1880: Liu Liang
  - 1880–1884: Liu Asheng
- Historical era: New Imperialism
  - Founding: 1777
  - Expedition to the West Coast of Borneo: 1823
  - Dutch conquest: 1884
Succeeded by
Dutch East Indies
- Today part of: Indonesia

The Lanfang Republic (Chinese: 蘭芳共和國; pinyin: Lánfāng Gònghéguó, Pha̍k-fa-sṳ: Làn-fông Khiung-fò-koet), also known as Lanfang Company (Chinese: 蘭芳公司; pinyin: Lánfāng Gōngsī), was a Kongsi republic in Western Borneo, in the territory of Sultanate of Sambas. It was established by a Hakka Chinese named Luo Fangbo in 1777 until it was ended by Dutch occupation in 1884.

== Arrival of the Chinese ==
The sultans of Western Borneo, including Sambas, Sukadana and Landak all imported Chinese laborers in the 18th century to work in gold or tin mines. A number of mining companies enjoyed some political autonomy, but Lanfang is the best known because its history was written by Yap Siong-yoen, the son-in-law of the last kapitan of the Lanfang Company, which was translated into Dutch in 1885, and J. J. M. de Groot, a Dutch sinologist who recorded Lanfang's history with the help of its last President, Liu Asheng. None of the other Chinese mining organizations in western Kalimantan left written accounts; the records of the others were documented by Dutch sinologists.

== Rule of Low Lan Pak ==
The founding father of the Lanfang Kongsi was Low Fong Pak (羅芳伯), who came from Meizhou in Guangdong Province. Chinese settlers have long lived on Borneo, with most engaging in trading and mining. They formed their own companies, among which was the Southern Company headed by Low.

Low established the Lanfang Company in 1777 (with its capital in Mandor), and it quickly emerged as the leading government in the region. The settlers subsequently elected Low as their inaugural leader. At the beginning of the Low's leadership, he knew that they would not survive long on a land surrounded by western colonizers. To seek protection, Low insisted on claiming Lanfang Republic as a company to seek asylum from the Qing empire. Unfortunately, the Qianlong Emperor didn't accept Low's proposal of becoming the Qing Empire's tributary state but accepted the trade agreement. After Low received the official response from Qianlong, he promptly showcased it as evidence of loyalty to the Qing Empire. This action effectively intimidated the Dutch and forced them to cease their hostile activities against the Lanfang Republic.

After Low had secured the Lanfang Republic's future, he implemented many democratic principles, including the idea that all matters of state must involve the consultation of the republic's citizenry. The republic had not a standing army but a defense ministry, which administered a national militia based on conscription. During peacetime, the populace mostly engaged in farming, production, trading, and mining. Lanfang's administrative divisions included three tiers (province, prefecture, and county) with the people electing leaders for all levels. Lanfang was allied, with Sultan Abdurrahman of the Pontianak Sultanate.

Low served as head of state until his death in 1795. Afterwards, Lanfang citizens elected Jiang Wubo (江戊伯) as their next president. They elected a total of twelve leaders, who helped improve agricultural techniques, expand mine production, develop cultural education, and organize military training.

== Dutch conquest ==
In the mid-to-late 19th century, the Chinese Qing Empire weakened substantially. Thus, the Lanfang Company's vigorous development suffered from the eventual expansion of the Dutch. The Mandor community waged a tenacious resistance but ultimately failed because of its poor weaponry. Lin Ah Sin was the last leader of Lanfang. Many of Lanfang's citizens and their descendants made their way to Sumatra or Singapore. The three campaigns waged by the Dutch East Indies Army against the Lanfang Company:

- Expedition to the West Coast of Borneo (1822–24)
- Expedition against the Chinese in Montrado (1850–54)
- Chinese uprising in Mandor, Borneo (1884–85)

This last campaign resulted in the subjugation of the Chinese and the loss of autonomy.

Wary of Qing intervention, the Dutch did not openly annex the lands controlled by the Lanfang Company but created another puppet regime. It was not until 1912, after the Qing dynasty's collapse, that the Dutch proclaimed their occupation.

== See also ==
- Kengwei Republic

== Sources ==
- Blussé, Léonard; Zurndorfer, Harriet Thelma; Zürcher, Erik Jan, eds. (1993). Conflict and Accommodation in Early Modern East Asia: Essays in Honour of Erik Zürcher. Vol. 29 of Sinica Leidensia (illustrated ed.). BRILL. ISBN 9004097759.
- Chin, John M. (1981). The Sarawak Chinese (illustrated ed.). Oxford University Press, Incorporated. ISBN 0195804708.
- Gakuen, Seijō (1967). Uchida, Naosaku; Ikeda, Kōtarō (eds.). Social and economic aspects of Japan: Seijo Gakuen jubilee year, 1917-1967. Economic Institute of Seijo University.
- Gerber, James; Guang, Lei, eds. (2006). Agriculture and Rural Connections in the Pacific, 1500-1900. Vol. 13 of The Pacific World: Lands, Peoples And History of the Pacific, 1500–1900 (illustrated ed.). Ashgate/Variorum. ISBN 0754639789.
- Gernet, Jacques (1996). A History of Chinese Civilization (illustrated, reprint, revised ed.). Cambridge University Press. ISBN 0521497817.
- Heidhues, Mary F. Somers (2003). Golddiggers, Farmers, and Traders in the "Chinese Districts" of West Kalimantan, Indonesia. Vol. 34 of Southeast Asia publications series (illustrated ed.). SEAP Publications. ISBN 0877277338.
- Irwin, Graham (1955). Nineteenth-century Borneo: A Study in Diplomatic Rivalry. Part 15 of Verhandelingen van het Koninklijk Instituut voor Taal-, Land- en Volkenkunde. M. Nijhoff.
- Lindsey, Timothy; Pausacker, Helen; Coppel, Charles A. (2005). Lindsey, Timothy; Pausacker, Helen; Coppel, Charles A. (eds.). Chinese Indonesians: remembering, distorting, forgetting (illustrated ed.). Institute of Southeast Asian Studies. ISBN 9812302867.
- Luo, Xianglin; Luo, Fangbo (1941). Luo Fangbo suo jian Boluozhou Kundian Lanfang da zong zhi kao (illustrated ed.).
- 羅, 香林 (1961). 西婆羅洲羅芳伯等所建共和國考. 中國學社.
- Museum für Völkerkunde zu Leipzig (1997). Jahrbuch des Museums für Völkerkunde zu Leipzig, Volume 41. Lit-Verlag. ISBN 3825834328.
- Oelschlägel, Anett C.; Nentwig, Ingo; Taube, Jakob, eds. (2005). "Roter Altai, gib dein Echo!": Festschrift für Erika Taube zum 65. Geburtstag (in German). Contributor: Erika Taube. Leipziger Universitätsverlag. ISBN 3865830625.
- Reece, Bob; Persatuan Kesusasteraan Sarawak (1993). Datu Bandar Abang Hj. Mustapha of Sarawak: some reflections of his life and times. Sarawak Literary Society.
- Reid, Anthony; Alilunas-Rodgers, Kristine, eds. (1996). Sojourners and Settlers: Histories of Southeast China and the Chinese (illustrated, reprint ed.). University of Hawaii Press. ISBN 0824824466.
- Reid, Anthony (2008). Reid, Anthony (ed.). The Chinese Diaspora in the Pacific. Vol. 16 of The Pacific World Lands, Peoples and History of the Pacific, 1500–1900. Ashgate. ISBN 978-0754657491.
- Yong, Paul (1994). A dream of freedom: the early Sarawak Chinese (2, illustrated ed.). Pelanduk Publications. ISBN 9679783774.
- YUNOS, ROZAN (May 23, 2011). "Saga of Lanfang Republic". THE BRUNEI TIMES. BANDAR SERI BEGAWAN. Archived from the original on 14 July 2014.
- Setyautama, Sam; Mihardja, Suma (2008). Tokoh-tokoh etnis Tionghoa di Indonesia (in Malay). Kepustakaan Populer Gramedia. ISBN 978-9799101259.
- Suryadinata, Leo, ed. (1997). Political Thinking of the Indonesian Chinese: 1900-1977; a Sourcebook. Singapore: Institute of Southeast Asian Studies. ISBN 9789971692018.
- Tai Peng, Wang (1994). The origins of Chinese kongsi. Pelanduk Publications. ISBN 9679784495.
- Zhang, Delai (2002). The Hakkas of Sabah: A Survey of Their Impact on the Modernization of the Bornean Malaysian State. Sabah Theological Seminary. ISBN 9834084005.
- Zheng, Dekun (1982). Studies in Chinese Archaeology. Vol. 3 of Centre for Chinese Archaeology and Art Hong Kong: Studies series. Chinese University Press. ISBN 9622012612.
- Zheng, Dekun (1969). Archaeology in Sarawak (illustrated ed.). Heffer. ISBN 0852700113. Archived from the original on Jul 20, 2006.
- "The Eurozone as a Lan Fang Republic". Manifesta Journal. 2012. Archived from the original on 9 February 2018.
- The Sarawak Museum Journal. Vol. 9 of The Sarawak Museum Journal: For the Promotion of Scientific Knowledge and Study of the Natives and Natural History of the Island of Borneo, Sarawak Museum. Contributor: Sarawak Museum. Sarawak Museum. 1959.
- The Sarawak Museum Journal, Volume 19. Sarawak Museum (Contributor). Sarawak Museum. 1971.
- Contributor: Royal Numismatic Society (Great Britain) (1993). The Numismatic Chronicle, Volume 153. Royal Numismatic Society.
- Excerpta Indonesica, Issues 58-62. Contributors: Koninklijk Instituut voor Taal-, Land- en Volkenkunde (Netherlands). Afdeling Documentatie Modern Indonesie, Koninklijk Instituut voor Taal-, Land- en Volkenkunde (Netherlands). Bibliotheek. Centre for Documentation of Modern Indonesia, Royal Institute of Linguistics and Anthropology. 1998.
- Mitteilungen der Gesellschaft für Natur- und Völkerkunde Ostasiens, Volume 75; Volume 77c. Contributors: Deutsche Gesellschaft für Natur- und Völkerkunde Ostasiens, Tokyo. 1979.
- China Today, Volume 6. Contributors: China Today Society, Taiwan, Taipei (City). Institute for Chinese Culture, Institute of Chinese Culture, T'ai-pei, Institute for Advanced Chinese studies, Chung-kuo wen hua hsüeh yüan. Chung-Kuo wen hua yen chiu so, Chinese Translation Society, Chung-Kuo wen hua yen chiu so, Tai pei, United Publishing Center, Inc, Chinese Institute of Translation and Research. Institute of Chinese Culture. 1963.
- Revue bibliographique de sinologie, Volumes 6-7 (in French). Contributors: Ecole des hautes études en sciences sociales, Ecole pratique des hautes études (France). Section des sciences économiques et sociales, École pratique des hautes études (France). Section des sciences historiques et philologiques. Editions de l'Ecole des hautes études en sciences sociales. 1988.
- Taiwan guang Hua za zhi, Volume 33, Issues 7-12. 光華畫報雜誌社. 2008.
- Tempo: Indonesia's Weekly News Magazine, Volume 4, Issues 43-52. Arsa Raya Perdana. 2004.
- Heidhues, Mary Somers (2001), "Chinese Settlements in Rural Southeast Asia: Unwritten Histories", in Anthony Reid (ed.), Sojourners and Settlers: Histories of Southeast Asia and the Chinese, Honolulu: University of Hawaii Press.
