= Mandor rebellion =

19th-century uprising against Dutch East Indies

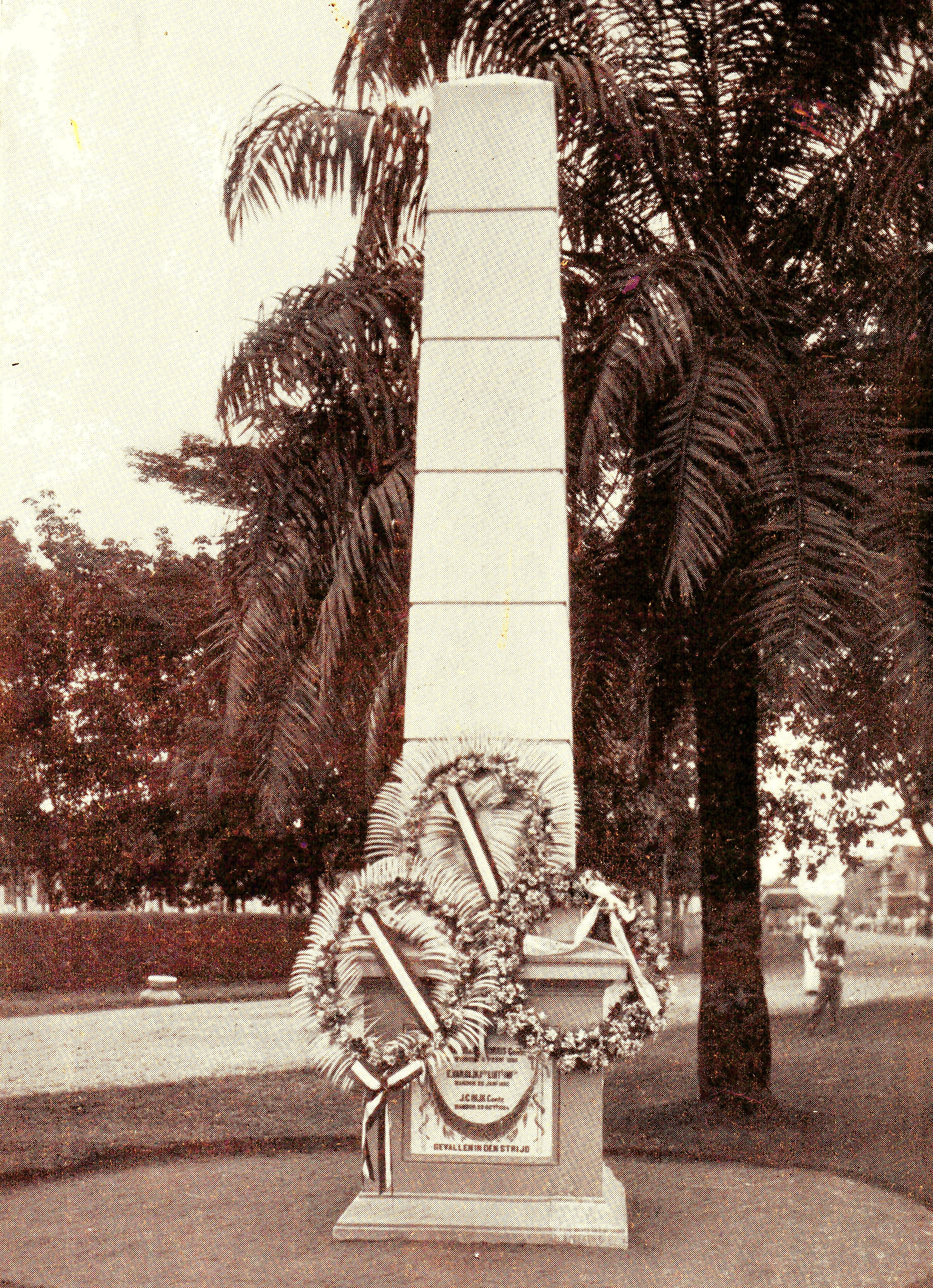
- Mandor monument at Pontianak
| Date | October 23, 1884 – February 5, 1885 |
| Location | West Borneo (present day West Kalimantan) |
| Result | Dutch victory |
| Territorial changes | Lanfang Republic annexed into the Dutch East Indies |

Belligerents
| Dutch East Indies | Lanfang Republic; Dayak and Chinese militia |

Commanders and leaders
| (Dutch East Indies) A.J. Tengbergen (Dutch East Indies) L.T.H. Cranen (Dutch East Indies) Erik S. Shore (Dutch East Indies) Frederick van Braam Morris | Lin Ah Sin (surrendered); Xelen Chi Tong (WIA) (surrendered); Zhou Wu Li (surrendered); Peng Shilun (surrendered) (POW) |

Strength
| Unknown | Unknown |

Casualties and losses
| Unknown | Unknown |

The Mandor rebellion (Chinese: 工頭叛亂) in 1884 and 1885, also called the Third Kongsi War, was an uprising of ethnic Chinese, assisted by the Dayaks, against the Dutch East Indies government in present-day West Kalimantan, Indonesia. Mandor can be translated to construction foreman in Indonesian language.

This was the Dutch view of events — i.e. as an area already under Dutch rule, where that rule was threatened by an uprising. The rebels appear to have seen things differently, evidently considering themselves as the last-ditch defenders of the overwhelmingly Chinese Lanfang Republic, a kongsi federation that had existed in the area since the late 18th century, upholding it against a Dutch invasion which put a final end to its existence in 1884–85.

== Background ==
In western Borneo the Chinese established their first major mining settlement in 1760 and ousted Dutch settlers and the local Malay princes, including establishing a state of their own, the Lanfang Republic. The Lanfang Republic was one of the three largest kongsi federations that controlled territory in western Borneo. By 1819 they came into conflict with the new Dutch government and were seen as "incompatible" with its objectives, yet indispensable for the development of the region. Thus, there was a long history of conflict preceding the outbreak of 1884-1885.

Most of the kongsi federations were dismantled by the Dutch after the Kongsi Wars. The Lanfang Republic was one of the last kongsi federations to survive because they negotiated a deal with the Dutch that allowed them to remain autonomous. Lanfang could still select its own rulers, but the Dutch had the right to approve the federation's leaders. By the mid-nineteenth century, the Dutch sought to limit the authority of the Lanfang Republic.

== Start of the uprising ==
In a sudden outbreak of rebellion among the Chinese in Mandor on October 23, 1884, Controller De Rijk and 4 or 5 of his aides were killed in or near his home. The revolt spread very quickly because the Chinese were helped by the Dayaks and thus armed groups emerged which repeatedly attacked the Dutch patrols. There were defined as "gangs" by the Dutch authorities, and by their method of operation could also be termed as guerrilla bands.

== Further events ==
Dutch colonial records provide details of various incidents and of the soldiers killed in them, defined - as was common usage at the time - as either "European" or "Native". As can be seen, these records provide little information on the motivation and grievances of the Chinese and Dayak insurgents, and take for granted that they had to be fought and suppressed.

The following incidents were marked in Dutch records:

- On December 24, 1884, a patrol was traveling through Landak, searching for the Dayak chief Goenang Pa who was allegedly hiding two prominent Chinese insurgents. However, at Kpg. Sebadoe the patrol came suddenly under attack by Chinese and Dayak insurgents shooting from entrenchments. The Dutch had to withdraw, leaving the badly wounded European rifleman van den Berg (No. 16923) in the hands of their enemies.
- On January 3, 1885 a reconnaissance patrol came under fire near Mamie and had to retreat. During this attack, infantry captain A.J. Tengbergen was injured.
- On January 6 near Theo Toe Kong, a patrol of 30 men led by first lieutenant L.T.H. Cranen encountered the same "gang". During this encounter, the European Sergeant A.H. Schwartz (No. 12698) was killed and the patrol commander and three Europeans were injured.
- After Dutch patrols had been beaten back with heavy losses several times, the Chinese became more reckless and they repeatedly attacked the supply transports between Ko Phiang and Mandor.
- A transport on January 20, 1885 suffered two killed, namely the European rifleman Schoonheere (No. 4923) and the native rifleman Bangoeloeng (No. 9606). as well as three wounded.
- During a convoy on 24 January 24th, 1885 the European rifleman Ramel (No. 9606) was killed.
- On January 25 the convoy was again attacked. During this attack the European Corporal De Bruyn (No. 14788), the European rifleman Segalas (no. 1157) and the native rifleman Batong (No. 9152) were killed. Native rifleman Inan (No. 13915) was seriously wounded and died later; first lieutenant E. van Dijk died during this transport due to a heat stroke.
- During an attack on the Steamer Emanuel traveling from Pontianak to Mentidoeng, Rifleman Simoel (No. 13,976) was wounded. He fell into the river Mempawah and drowned.
- F. van Braam Morris, the controller of Mempawah District, and a detachment of soldiers, were joined by some Dayaks. They tried to reconquer an outpost at Mentidoeng that had been abandoned on the on January 27 and was now held by the Chinese. The attempt failed and controller van Braam Morris was killed. The European rifleman Zuurveen (No. 5994) was seriously injured and died February 7. The native rifleman Sajat was also wounded.
- On February 3, 1885 a survey from Mandor to Theo Toe Kong was carried out by a column with 100 bayonets and two mortars. At a quarter of an hour's travel from Theo Toe Kong, the party was fired upon heavily from a fortress in the forest. The native rifleman May (No. 90561) was seriously wounded and later died.

== The Mandor monument ==
In memory of the fallen in the Mandor revolt in 1889, the Dutch colonial authorities erected in Pontianak a memorial column.

At the front of the obelisk was a marble plate with the following names:

- F. van Braam Morris, Controller. Mentidoeng, February 5, 1885.
- E. van Dijk, infantry, first lieutenant, Mandor, June 25, 1885.
- J.C. de Rijk, Controller, Mandor October 23, 1884.

The text underneath reads: Fallen in battle.
The text at the back reads: In memory of:

- Sergeant Schwartz, Corporal de Bruyn.
- Riflemen Van den Berg, Ramel, Schoonheere, Segalas, Zuurveen, Bangoeloeng, Batong, Inan, Simoel, May.
  1884- Mandor - 1885.

The number and names of fallen Chinese and Dayak insurgents were not recorded with such exactitude.
