= Kongsi =

Hokkien transcription term meaning "company"

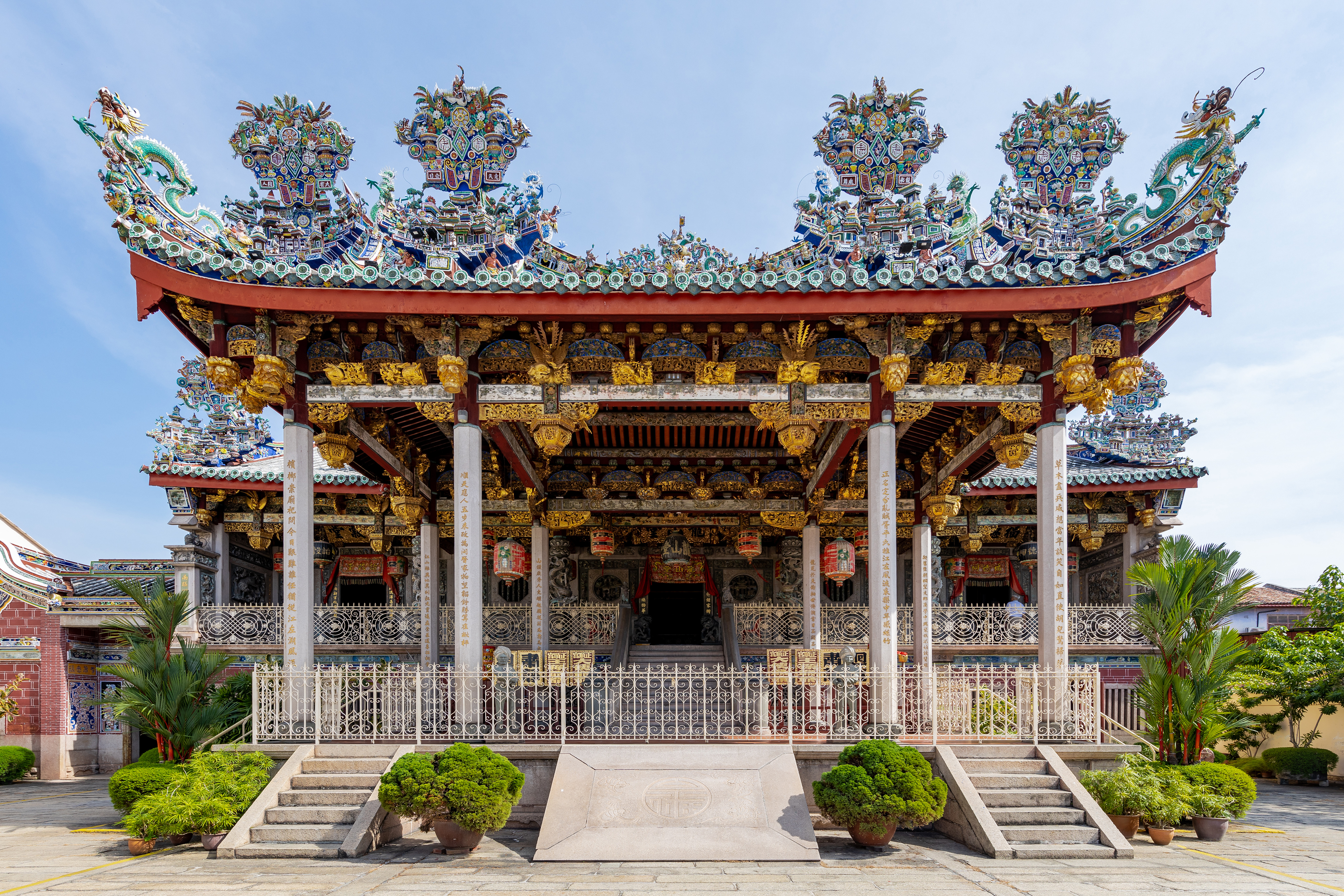
Khoo Kongsi Clan House, Georgetown, Penang

Kongsi (Chinese: 公司; Pe̍h-ōe-jī: kong-si; pinyin: gōngsī; Jyutping: gung1 si1) is a Hokkien transcription of a Chinese term meaning "company", especially businesses which have been incorporated. However, the word has other meanings under different historical contexts. Kongsi were most commonly known as Chinese social organizations or partnerships, but the term was also used for various Chinese institutions.

Amongst overseas Chinese, the word kongsi was applied to reference both clan organizations, whose members shared a common descent, and to district-dialect clubs, for Chinese immigrants originating from the same district speaking the same dialect. In the late 19th century, these district-dialect associations came to be known as wui gun (huiguan; traditional Chinese: 會館; simplified Chinese: 会馆; Jyutping: wui^{6}gun^{2}; pinyin: huìguǎn), especially in San Francisco, California where many Chinese from eight districts on the west side of the Pearl River Delta near the City of Canton went for the California gold rush.

== Southeast Asia ==
In Southeast Asia, the kongsi republics were made up of Hakka Chinese mining communities that united into political entities that functioned as self-governing states. By the mid-nineteenth century, the kongsi republics controlled most of western Borneo. The three largest kongsi republics were the Lanfang Republic, the Heshun Republic (Fosjoen), and the Santiaogou Federation (Samtiaokioe).

== Functions ==
The system of kongsi was utilized by Cantonese throughout the diaspora to overcome economic difficulty, social ostracism, and oppression. In today's Cantonese communities throughout the world, this approach has been adapted to the modern environment, including political and legal factors. The kongsi is similar to modern business partnerships, but also draws on a deeper spirit of cooperation and consideration of mutual welfare. It is believed by some that the development and thriving of Cantonese communities worldwide are the direct result of the kongsi concept. A vast number of Cantonese-run firms and businesses that were born as kongsi ended up as multinational conglomerates.

== See also ==
- Chinese ancestral worship
- Ancestral shrine and ancestral tablets
- Zupu and Chinese lineage associations
- Penghu Shuixian Temple (Taixiajiao Kongsi)
- Eng Chuan Tong Tan Kongsi, Malaysia
- Khoo Kongsi, Malaysia
- Ngee Ann Kongsi (義安公司), Singapore
- Kongsi republic (Lanfang Republic)
- Tong (organization)
- Hui (secret society)
- Ghee Hin Kongsi (義興公司)
- Ngee Heng Kongsi of Johor
- Hai San Secret Society
