= Expedition against the Chinese in Montrado =

Dutch-Kongsi war in Borneo (c. 1854–1855)

Date	1854–1855
Location	Borneo
Result	Dutch victory; Rebellion suppressed.

Belligerents
Netherlands; Pro-Dutch Indonesian volunteers	Pro-Chinese rebels Chinese volunteers

Commanders and leaders
(Netherlands) Erik S. Shore	Unknown

Strength
Dutch: 2,200 men in Kalimantan; 1,700 men in Sambas and Pontianak; Pro-Dutch volunteers: Unknown	Unknown

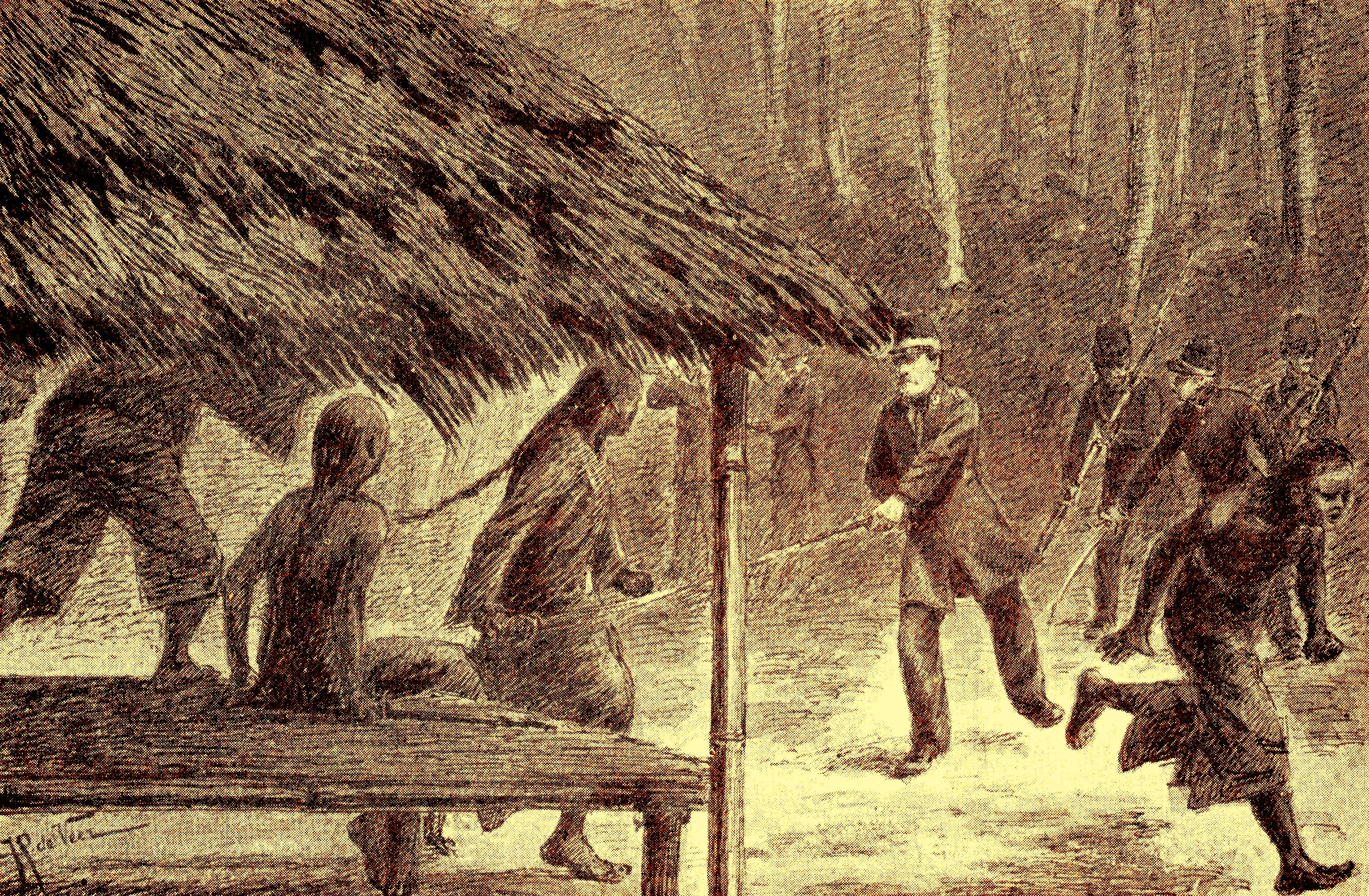
Attacking the Sam-tjam-foei by the KNIL led by captain Gustave Verspijck.

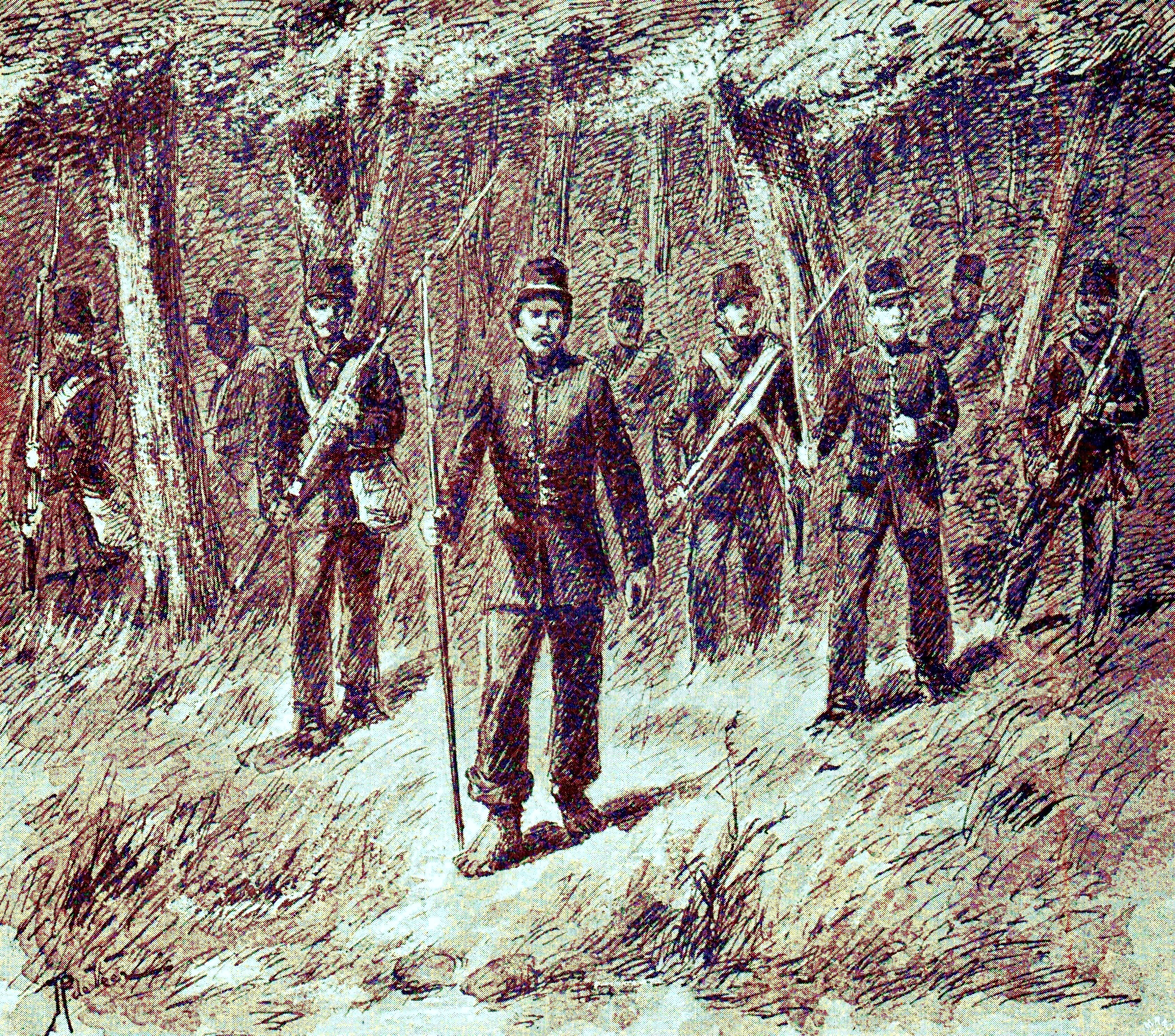
Major De Brabant near Singkawang.

The expedition against the Chinese in Montrado (1854–1855) was a punitive expedition of the Royal Netherlands Indies Army against Chinese kongsi in Montrado (Borneo).

== Background ==
The situation after a preview rebellion in West Kalimantan was not satisfactory to the Dutch. In May 1854, a 2,200 men strong expedition was sent to West Kalimantan led by Augustus Johannes Andresen, which had to advance to Monterado. The steam ships Celebes, Borneo and Onrust, junk Banda as well as the schooners Haai and Doris, carrying 1,700 men and artillery landed in Sambas and Pontianak. Attacks were launched from three directions. Singkawang was the first to be conquered.

== Battle ==
Battalion XIII and half of Battalion VII landed at Bentunai, and found no resistance, while the navy kept watch at the mouth of the Singkawang River. The journey from Bentunai to Singkawang was very difficult because of sporadic attacks from the enemy and various close-quarters battles using bayonets, although in the end the Chinese were repelled.

After a long march through heavy rains, Dutch troops arrived in Singkawang and the Chinese were hit from both sides and fell apart. The 18th Army under Major De Brabant raided the forts of the Chinese, and Singkawang became the base for further operations. A. J. Andresen began issuing statements encouraging residents to return to their homes, but the three Chinese kongsi refused to comply. Later, De Brabant was sent to Lohabang (between Singkawang and Monterado) with two companies; the Chinese were disclocated from their strongholds and Fort Kulor fell on 26 May. A few days later, prominent Chinese elders from Monterado came to surrender. Hanging placards with Chinese, Malay and Dutch contained statements that resistance had been quelled and peace had been requested. The kongsi council was declared disbanded and replaced by the Dutch; those caught possessing weapons or ammunition were sentenced to death. Andresen left Monterado on July 1, 1854, headed for Pontianak.
