= Monterado, Indonesia =

District in Indonesia

Monterado
- District
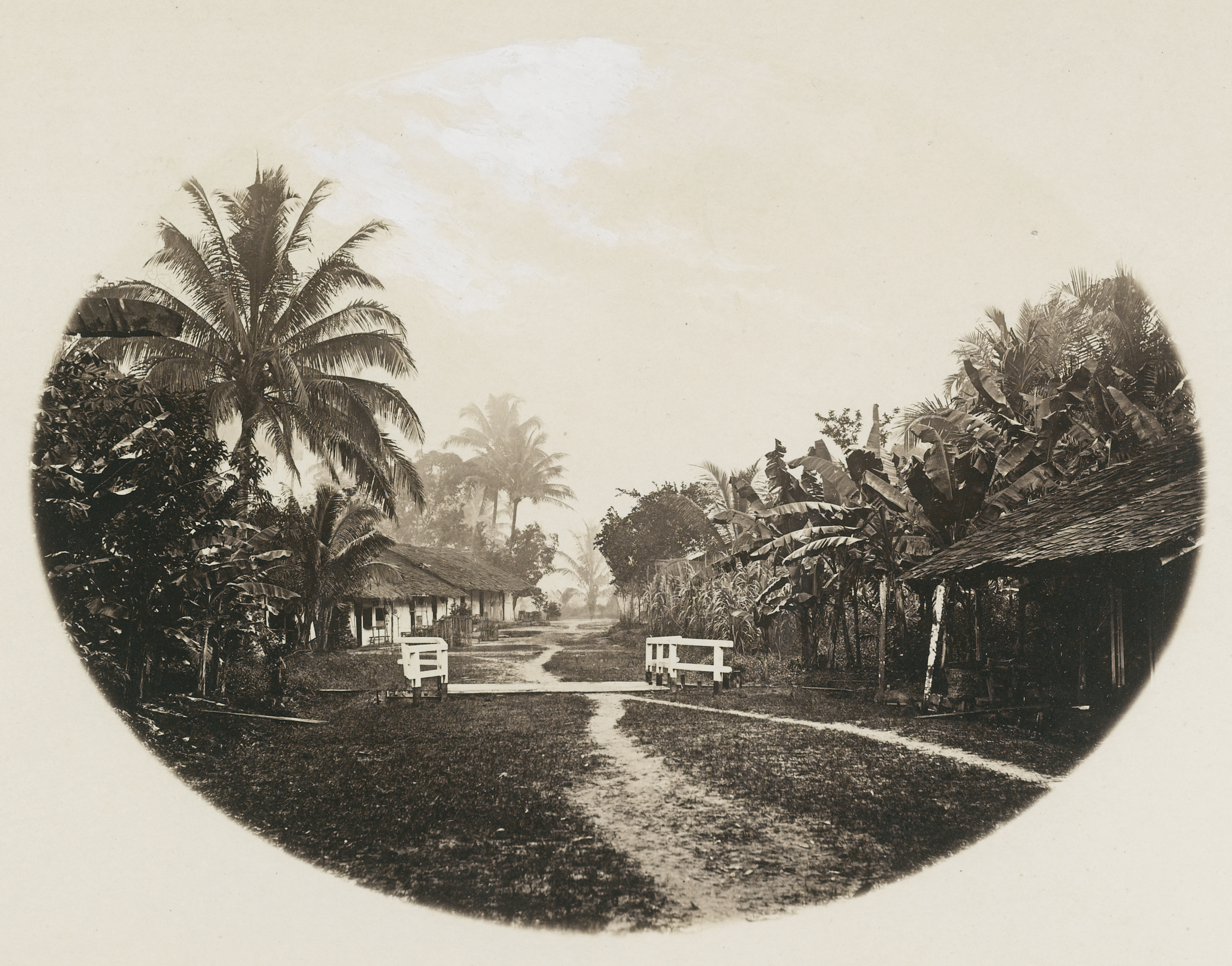
- Monterado in 1867

- Location within West Kalimantan Location within Kalimantan Location within Indonesia
- Coordinates: 0°45′27.7693″N 109°8′28.5014″E
- Country: Indonesia
- Province: West Kalimantan
- Regency: Bengkayang
- District seat: Monterado

Area
  - Total: 317.17 km^{2} (122.46 sq mi)

Population (2024)
  - Total: 35,928
  - Density: 113.28/km^{2} (293.39/sq mi)

Monterado is a district in Bengkayang Regency, West Kalimantan, Indonesia. In the mid 2024 estimate, it was inhabited by 35,928 people, and has a total area of 317.17 km^{2}.

== History ==
Monterado was established as a district in 2002, after being split off from the western part of Samalantan district.

== Geography ==
Monterado District consists of eleven villages (desa):

- Beringin Baru
- Gerantung
- Goa Boma
- Jahandung
- Mekar Baru
- Monterado
- Nek Ginap
- Rantau
- Sendoreng
- Serindu
- Siaga

== See also ==
- List of kongsi
