= ISO 639 macrolanguage =

Language scope defined in the ISO 639-3 standard

A macrolanguage is a group of mutually intelligible speech varieties, or dialect continuum, that have no traditional name in common, and which may be considered distinct languages by their speakers. Macrolanguages are used as a book-keeping mechanism for the ISO 639 international standard of language codes. Macrolanguages are established to assist mapping between different sets of ISO language codes. Specifically, there may be a many-to-one correspondence between ISO 639-3, intended to identify all the thousands of languages of the world, and either of two other sets, ISO 639-1, established to identify languages in computer systems, and ISO 639-2, which encodes a few hundred languages for library cataloguing and bibliographic purposes. When such many-to-one ISO 639-2 codes are included in an ISO 639-3 context, they are called "macrolanguages" to distinguish them from the corresponding individual languages of ISO 639-3. According to the ISO,

Some existing code elements in ISO 639-2, and the corresponding code elements in ISO 639-1, are designated in those parts of ISO 639 as individual language code elements, yet are in a one-to-many relationship with individual language code elements in [ISO 639-3]. For purposes of [ISO 639-3], they are considered to be macrolanguage code elements.

— ISO 639-3: Relationship between ISO 639-3 and the other parts of ISO 639

ISO 639-3 is curated by SIL International; ISO 639-2 is curated by the Library of Congress (USA).

The mapping often has the implication that it covers borderline cases where two language varieties may be considered strongly divergent dialects of the same language or very closely related languages (dialect continua); it may also encompass situations when there are language varieties that are considered to be varieties of the same language on the grounds of ethnic, cultural, and political considerations, rather than linguistic reasons. However, this is not its primary function and the classification is not evenly applied.

For example, Chinese is a macrolanguage encompassing many languages that are not mutually intelligible, but the languages "Standard German", "Bavarian German", and other closely related languages do not form a macrolanguage, despite being more mutually intelligible. Other examples include Tajiki not being part of the Persian macrolanguage despite sharing much lexicon, and Urdu and Hindi not forming a macrolanguage despite forming a mutually intelligible dialect continuum. All dialects of Hindi are considered separate languages. Basically, ISO 639-2 and ISO 639-3 use different criteria for dividing language varieties into languages, 639-2 uses shared writing systems and literature more whereas 639-3 focuses on mutual intelligibility and shared lexicon. The macrolanguages exist within the ISO 639-3 code set to make mapping between the two sets easier.

The use of macrolanguages was applied in Ethnologue, starting in the 16th edition. The most recent registered macrolanguage is Sanskrit with code san, adopted in 15 December 2023, though it already existed as individual language for several years.

As of 21 December 2023, there are fifty-nine language codes in ISO 639-2 that are counted as macrolanguages in ISO 639-3. Some of the macrolanguages had no individual language (as defined by 639-3) in ISO 639-2, e.g. "ara" (Arabic), but ISO 639-3 recognizes different varieties of Arabic as separate languages under some circumstances. Others, like "nor" (Norwegian) had their two individual parts (nno Nynorsk, nob Bokmål) already in 639-2. That means some languages (e.g. "arb" Standard Arabic) that were considered by ISO 639-2 to be dialects of one language ("ara") are now in ISO 639-3 in certain contexts considered to be individual languages themselves. This is an attempt to deal with varieties that may be linguistically distinct from each other, but are treated by their speakers as forms of the same language, e.g. in cases of diglossia. For example,

- Generic Arabic, 639-2
- Standard Arabic, 639-3

ISO 639-2 also includes codes for collections of languages; these are not the same as macrolanguages. These collections of languages are excluded from ISO 639-3, because they never refer to individual languages. Most such codes are included in ISO 639-5.

== Types of macrolanguages ==
- elements that have no ISO 639-2 code: 4 (bnc, hbs, kln, luy)
- elements that have no ISO 639-1 code: 29
- elements that do have ISO 639-1 codes: 34
- elements whose individual languages have ISO 639-1 codes: 4
  - aka – tw
  - hbs – bs, hr, sr
  - msa – id
  - nor – nb, nn

== List of macrolanguages ==
This list only includes official data from SIL International.

ISO 639-1	ISO 639-2	ISO 639-3	Number of individual languages	Name of macrolanguage
ak	aka	aka	2	Akan language
ar	ara	ara	28 + retired 2	Arabic language
ay	aym	aym	2	Aymara language
az	aze	aze	2	Azerbaijani language
(-)	bal	bal	3	Baluchi language
(-)	bik	bik	8 + retired 1	Bikol language
(-)	(-)	bnc	5	Bontok language
(-)	bua	bua	3	Buriat language
(-)	chm	chm	2	Mari language (Russia)
cr	cre	cre	6	Cree language
(-)	del	del	2	Delaware language
(-)	den	den	2	Slavey language (Athapascan)
(-)	din	din	5	Dinka language
(-)	doi	doi	2	Dogri language
et	est	est	2	Estonian language
fa	fas/per	fas	2	Persian language
ff	ful	ful	9	Fulah language
(-)	gba	gba	6 + retired 1	Gbaya language (Central African Republic)
(-)	gon	gon	3 + retired 1	Gondi language
(-)	grb	grb	5	Grebo language
gn	grn	grn	5	Guaraní language
(-)	hai	hai	2	Haida language
(-)	(-)	hbs	4	Serbo-Croatian
(-)	hmn	hmn	25 + retired 1	Hmong language
iu	iku	iku	2	Inuktitut language
ik	ipk	ipk	2	Inupiaq language
(-)	jrb	jrb	4 + retired 1	Judeo-Arabic languages
kr	kau	kau	3	Kanuri language
(-)	(-)	kln	9	Kalenjin languages
(-)	kok	kok	2	Konkani language
kv	kom	kom	2	Komi language
kg	kon	kon	3	Kongo language
(-)	kpe	kpe	2	Kpelle language
ku	kur	kur	3	Kurdish language
(-)	lah	lah	7 + retired 1	Lahnda language
lv	lav	lav	2	Latvian language
(-)	(-)	luy	14	Luyia language
(-)	man	man	6 + retired 1	Manding languages
mg	mlg	mlg	11 + retired 1	Malagasy language
mn	mon	mon	2	Mongolian language
ms	msa/may	msa	36 + retired 1	Malay language
(-)	mwr	mwr	6	Marwari language
ne	nep	nep	2	Nepali language
no	nor	nor	2	Norwegian language
oj	oji	oji	7	Ojibwa language
or	ori	ori	2	Oriya language
om	orm	orm	4	Oromo language
ps	pus	pus	3	Pashto language
qu	que	que	43 + retired 1	Quechua language
(-)	raj	raj	6	Rajasthani language
(-)	rom	rom	7	Romany language
sa	san	san	2	Sanskrit language
sq	sqi/alb	sqi	4	Albanian language
sc	srd	srd	4	Sardinian language
sw	swa	swa	2	Swahili language
(-)	syr	syr	2	Syriac language
(-)	tmh	tmh	4	Tuareg languages
uz	uzb	uzb	2	Uzbek language
yi	yid	yid	2	Yiddish language
(-)	zap	zap	58 + retired 1	Zapotec language
za	zha	zha	16 + retired 2	Zhuang languages
zh	zho/chi	zho	19	Chinese language
(-)	zza	zza	2	Zaza language
34	59	63	444 + retired 15	total codes
ISO 639-1	ISO 639-2	ISO 639-3	Number of individual languages	Name of macrolanguage

ISO 639-2/RA Change Notice
ISO 639-1 Code	ISO 639-2 Code	English name of Language	French name of Language	Date Added or Changed	Category of Change	Notes
[-sh]	(none)	Serbo-Croatian	serbo-croate	2000-02-18	Dep	This code was deprecated in 2000 because there were separate language codes for each individual language represented (Serbian, Croatian, and then Bosnian was added). It was published in a revision of ISO 639-1, but was never included in ISO 639-2. It is considered a macrolanguage (general name for a cluster of closely related individual languages) in ISO 639-3. Its deprecated status was reaffirmed by the ISO 639 JAC in 2005.
sr	srp [scc]	Serbian	serbe	2008-06-28	CC	ISO 639-2/B code deprecated in favor of ISO 639-2/T code
hr	hrv [scr]	Croatian	croate	2008-06-28	CC	ISO 639-2/B code deprecated in favor of ISO 639-2/T code

== List of macrolanguages and the individual languages ==
This is a complete list of the individual language codes that comprise the macrolanguages in the ISO 639-3 code tables as of 6 March 2023.

=== aaa–ezz ===
==== aka ====
aka is the ISO 639-3 language code for Akan. Its ISO 639-1 code is ak. There are two individual language codes assigned:

- fat – Fanti
- twi – Twi

==== ara ====
ara is the ISO 639-3 language code for Arabic. Its ISO 639-1 code is ar. There are twenty-eight individual language codes assigned:

- aao – Algerian Saharan Arabic
- abh – Tajiki Arabic
- abv – Baharna Arabic
- acm – Mesopotamian Arabic
- acq – Ta'izzi-Adeni Arabic
- acw – Hijazi Arabic
- acx – Omani Arabic
- acy – Cypriot Arabic
- adf – Dhofari Arabic
- aeb – Tunisian Arabic
- aec – Saidi Arabic
- afb – Gulf Arabic
- apc – Levantine Arabic
- apd – Sudanese Arabic
- arb – Standard Arabic
- arq – Algerian Arabic
- ars – Najdi Arabic
- ary – Moroccan Arabic
- arz – Egyptian Arabic
- auz – Uzbeki Arabic
- avl – Eastern Egyptian Bedawi Arabic
- ayh – Hadrami Arabic
- ayl – Libyan Arabic
- ayn – Sanaani Arabic
- ayp – North Mesopotamian Arabic
- pga – Sudanese Creole Arabic
- shu – Chadian Arabic
- ssh – Shihhi Arabic

The following codes were previously part of ara:

- ajp – South Levantine Arabic (merged with apc (formerly for the North one) to be a single Levantine Arabic)
- bbz – Babalia Creole Arabic (Non-existent; Code retired 23 January 2020)

==== aym ====
aym is the ISO 639-3 language code for Aymara. Its ISO 639-1 code is ay. There are two individual language codes assigned:

- ayc – Southern Aymara
- ayr – Central Aymara

==== aze ====
aze is the ISO 639-3 language code for Azerbaijani. Its ISO 639-1 code is az. There are two individual language codes assigned:

- azb – South Azerbaijani
- azj – North Azerbaijani

==== bal ====
bal is the ISO 639-3 language code for Baluchi. There are three individual language codes assigned:

- bcc – Southern Balochi
- bgn – Western Balochi
- bgp – Eastern Balochi

==== bik ====
bik is the ISO 639-3 language code for Bikol. There are eight individual language codes assigned:

- bcl – Central Bikol
- bln – Southern Catanduanes Bikol
- bto – Rinconada Bikol
- cts – Northern Catanduanes Bikol
- fbl – West Albay Bikol
- lbl – Libon Bikol
- rbl – Miraya Bikol
- ubl – Buhi'non Bikol

The following code was previously part of bik:

- bhk – Albay Bicolano (Split into Buhi'non Bikol [ubl], Libon Bikol [lbl], Miraya Bikol [rbl], and West Albay Bikol [fbl] on 18 January 2010)

==== bnc ====
bnc is the ISO 639-3 language code for Bontok. There are five individual language codes assigned:

- ebk – Eastern Bontok
- lbk – Central Bontok
- obk – Southern Bontok
- rbk – Northern Bontok
- vbk – Southwestern Bontok

==== bua ====
bua is the ISO 639-3 language code for Buriat. There are three individual language codes assigned:

- bxm – Mongolia Buriat
- bxr – Russia Buriat
- bxu – China Buriat

==== chm ====
chm is the ISO 639-3 language code for Mari, a language located in Russia. There are two individual language codes assigned:

- mhr – Eastern Mari
- mrj – Western Mari

==== cre ====
cre is the ISO 639-3 language code for Cree. Its ISO 639-1 code is cr. There are six individual language codes assigned:

- crj – Southern East Cree
- crk – Plains Cree
- crl – Northern East Cree
- crm – Moose Cree
- csw – Swampy Cree
- cwd – Woods Cree

In addition, there are six closely associated individual codes:

- nsk – Naskapi (part of the Cree language group but not included under the cre macrolanguage designation)
- moe – Montagnais (part of the Cree language group but not included under the cre macrolanguage designation)
- atj – Atikamekw (part of the Cree language group but not included under the cre macrolanguage designation)
- crg – Michif language (Cree-French mixed language with strong influences from Ojibwe language group and not included under the cre macrolanguage designation)
- ojs – Ojibwa, Severn (Ojibwa, Northern) (part of the Ojibwa language group with strong influences from the Cree language group and not included under the cre macrolanguage designation)
- ojw – Ojibwa, Western (part of the Ojibwa language group with strong influences from the Cree language group and not included under the cre macrolanguage designation)

In addition, there is one other language without individual codes closely associated, but not part of, this macrolanguage code:

- Bungee language (mixed language of Cree, Ojibwa, French, English, Assiniboine and Scottish Gaelic)

==== del ====
del is the ISO 639-3 language code for Delaware. There are two individual language codes assigned:

- umu – Munsee
- unm – Unami

==== den ====
den is the ISO 639-3 language code for Slave. There are two individual language codes assigned:

- scs – North Slavey
- xsl – South Slavey

==== din ====
din is the ISO 639-3 language code for Dinka. There are five individual language codes assigned:

- dib – South Central Dinka
- dik – Southwestern Dinka
- dip – Northeastern Dinka
- diw – Northwestern Dinka
- dks – Southeastern Dinka

==== doi ====
doi is the ISO 639-3 language code for Dogri. There are two individual language codes assigned:

- dgo – Dogri (individual language)
- xnr – Kangri

==== est ====
est is the ISO 639-3 language code for Estonian. Its ISO 639-1 code is et. There are two individual language codes assigned:

- ekk – Standard Estonian
- vro – Võro

=== faa–jzz ===
==== fas ====
fas is the ISO 639-3 language code for Persian. Its ISO 639-1 code is fa. There are two individual language codes assigned:

- pes – Iranian Persian
- prs – Dari

==== ful ====
ful is the ISO 639-2 and ISO 639-3 language code for Fulah (also spelled Fula). Its ISO 639-1 code is ff. There are nine individual language codes assigned for varieties of Fulah:

- ffm – Maasina Fulfulde
- fub – Adamawa Fulfulde
- fuc – Pulaar
- fue – Borgu Fulfulde
- fuf – Pular
- fuh – Western Niger Fulfulde
- fui – Bagirmi Fulfulde
- fuq – Central-Eastern Niger Fulfulde
- fuv – Nigerian Fulfulde

==== gba ====
gba is the ISO 639-3 language code for Gbaya located in the Central African Republic. There are six individual language codes assigned:

- bdt – Bokoto
- gbp – Gbaya-Bossangoa
- gbq – Gbaya-Bozoum
- gmm – Gbaya-Mbodomo
- gso – Southwest Gbaya
- gya – Northwest Gbaya

The following code was previously part of gba:

- mdo – Southwest Gbaya (Split into Southwest Gbaya [gso] (new identifier) and Gbaya-Mbodomo [gmm] on 14 January 2008)

==== gon ====
gon is the ISO 639-3 language code for Gondi. There are three individual language codes assigned:

- esg – Aheri Gondi
- gno – Northern Gondi
- wsg – Adilabad Gondi

The following code was previously part of gon:

- ggo – Southern Gondi (Split into [esg] Aheri Gondi and [wsg] Adilabad Gondi on 15 January 2016)

==== grb ====
grb is the ISO 639-3 language code for Grebo. There are five individual language codes assigned:

- gbo – Northern Grebo
- gec – Gboloo Grebo
- grj – Southern Grebo
- grv – Central Grebo
- gry – Barclayville Grebo

==== grn ====
grn is the ISO 639-3 language code for Guarani. Its ISO 639-1 code is gn. There are five individual language codes assigned:

- gnw – Western Bolivian Guaraní
- gug – Paraguayan Guaraní
- gui – Eastern Bolivian Guaraní
- gun – Mbyá Guaraní
- nhd – Chiripá

==== hai ====
hai is the ISO 639-3 language code for Haida. There are two individual language codes assigned:

- hax – Southern Haida
- hdn – Northern Haida

==== hbs ====
hbs is the ISO 639-3 language code for Serbo-Croatian. It formerly had an ISO 639-1 code sh but deprecated in 2000. There are four individual language codes assigned:

- bos – Bosnian
- cnr – Montenegrin
- hrv – Croatian
- srp – Serbian

==== hmn ====
hmn is the ISO 639-3 language code for Hmong. There are twenty-five individual language codes assigned:

- cqd – Chuanqiandian Cluster Miao
- hea – Northern Qiandong Miao
- hma – Southern Mashan Hmong
- hmc – Central Huishui Hmong
- hmd – Large Flowery Miao
- hme – Eastern Huishui Hmong
- hmg – Southwestern Guiyang Hmong
- hmh – Southwestern Huishui Hmong
- hmi – Northern Huishui Hmong
- hmj – Ge
- hml – Luopohe Hmong
- hmm – Central Mashan Hmong
- hmp – Northern Mashan Hmong
- hmq – Eastern Qiandong Miao
- hms – Southern Qiandong Miao
- hmw – Western Mashan Hmong
- hmy – Southern Guiyang Hmong
- hmz – Hmong Shua
- hnj – Hmong Njua
- hrm – Horned Miao
- huj – Northern Guiyang Hmong
- mmr – Western Xiangxi Miao
- muq – Eastern Xiangxi Miao
- mww – Hmong Daw
- sfm – Small Flowery Miao

The following code was previously part of hmn:

- blu – Hmong Njua (Split into Hmong Njua [hnj] (new identifier), Chuanqiandian Cluster Miao [cqd], Horned Miao [hrm], and Small Flowery Miao [sfm] on 14 January 2008)

==== iku ====
iku is the ISO 639-3 language code for Inuktitut. Its ISO 639-1 code is iu. There are two individual language codes assigned:

- ike – Eastern Canadian Inuktitut
- ikt – Inuinnaqtun

==== ipk ====
ipk is the ISO 639-3 language code for Inupiaq. Its ISO 639-1 code is ik. There are two individual language codes assigned:

- esi – North Alaskan Inupiatun
- esk – Northwest Alaska Inupiatun

==== jrb ====
jrb is the ISO 639-3 language code for Judeo-Arabic. There are four individual language codes assigned:

- aju – Judeo-Moroccan Arabic
- jye – Judeo-Yemeni Arabic
- yhd – Judeo-Iraqi Arabic
- yud – Judeo-Tripolitanian Arabic

The following code was previously part of jrb:

- ajt – Judeo-Tunisian Arabic (Moved to Tunisian Arabic [aeb] on 20 January 2022)

=== kaa–ozz ===
==== kau ====
kau is the ISO 639-2 and ISO 639-3 language code for the Kanuri. Its ISO 639-1 code is kr. There are three individual language codes assigned in ISO 639-3 for varieties of Kanuri:

- kby – Manga Kanuri
- knc – Central Kanuri
- krt – Tumari Kanuri

There are two other related languages that are not considered part of the macrolanguage under ISO 639:

- bms – Bilma Kanuri
- kbl – Kanembu

==== kln ====
kln is the ISO 639-3 language code for Kalenjin. There are nine individual language codes assigned:

- enb – Markweeta
- eyo – Keiyo
- niq – Nandi
- oki – Okiek
- pko – Pökoot
- sgc – Kipsigis
- spy – Sabaot
- tec – Terik
- tuy – Tugen

==== kok ====
kok is the ISO 639-3 language code for Konkani (macrolanguage). There are two individual language codes assigned:

- gom – Goan Konkani
- knn – Konkani (individual language)

Both languages are referred to as Konkani by their respective speakers.

==== kom ====
kom is the ISO 639-3 language code for Komi. Its ISO 639-1 code is kv. There are two individual language codes assigned:

- koi – Komi-Permyak
- kpv – Komi-Zyrian

==== kon ====
kon is the ISO 639-3 language code for Kongo. Its ISO 639-1 code is kg. There are three individual language codes assigned:

- kng – Koongo
- kwy – San Salvador Kongo
- ldi – Laari

==== kpe ====
kpe is the ISO 639-3 language code for Kpelle. There are two individual language codes assigned:

- gkp – Guinea Kpelle
- xpe – Liberia Kpelle

==== kur ====
kur is the ISO 639-3 language code for Kurdish. Its ISO 639-1 code is ku. There are three individual language codes assigned:

- ckb – Central Kurdish
- kmr – Northern Kurdish
- sdh – Southern Kurdish

==== lah ====
lah is the ISO 639-3 language code for Lahnda. There are seven individual language codes assigned.

- hnd – Southern Hindko
- hno – Northern Hindko
- jat – Jakati
- phr – Pahari-Potwari
- pnb – Western Panjabi
- skr – Saraiki
- xhe – Khetrani

lah does not include Panjabi/Punjabi (pan).

The following code was previously part of lah:

- pmu – Mirpur Panjabi (Moved to code "phr" on 12 January 2015)

==== lav ====
lav is the ISO 639-3 language code for Latvian. Its ISO 639-1 code is lv. There are two individual language codes assigned:

- ltg – Latgalian
- lvs – Standard Latvian

==== luy ====
luy is the ISO 639-3 language code for Luyia. There are fourteen individual language codes assigned:

- bxk – Bukusu
- ida – Idakho-Isukha-Tiriki
- lkb – Kabras
- lko – Khayo
- lks – Kisa
- lri – Marachi
- lrm – Marama
- lsm – Saamia
- lto – Tsotso
- lts – Tachoni
- lwg – Wanga
- nle – East Nyala
- nyd – Nyore
- rag – Logooli

==== man ====
man is the ISO 639-3 language code for Mandingo. There are six individual language codes assigned:

- emk – Eastern Maninkakan
- mku – Konyanka Maninka
- mlq – Western Maninkakan
- mnk – Mandinka
- msc – Sankaran Maninka
- mwk – Kita Maninkakan

The following codes were previously part of man:

- myq – Forest Maninka (Non-existent; Code retired 23 January 2013)

==== mlg ====
mlg is the ISO 639-3 language code for Malagasy. Its ISO 639-1 code is mg. There are eleven individual language codes assigned:

- bhr – Bara Malagasy
- bmm – Northern Betsimisaraka Malagasy
- bzc – Southern Betsimisaraka Malagasy
- msh – Masikoro Malagasy
- plt – Plateau Malagasy
- skg – Sakalava Malagasy
- tdx – Tandroy-Mahafaly Malagasy
- tkg – Tesaka Malagasy
- txy – Tanosy Malagasy
- xmv – Antankarana Malagasy
- xmw – Tsimihety Malagasy

The following codes were previously part of mlg:

- bjq – Southern Betsimisaraka Malagasy (Split into Southern Betsimisaraka [bzc] and Tesaka Malagasy [tkg] on 18 May 2011)

==== mon ====
mon is the ISO 639-3 language code for Mongolian. Its ISO 639-1 code is mn. There are two individual language codes assigned:

- khk – Halh Mongolian
- mvf – Peripheral Mongolian

==== msa ====
msa is the ISO 639-3 language code for Malay (macrolanguage). Its ISO 639-1 code is ms. There are thirty-six individual language codes assigned:

- bjn – Banjar
- btj – Bacanese Malay
- bve – Berau Malay
- bvu – Bukit Malay
- coa – Cocos Islands Malay
- dup – Duano
- hji – Haji
- ind – Indonesian
- jak – Jakun
- jax – Jambi Malay
- kvb – Kubu
- kvr – Kerinci
- kxd – Brunei
- lce – Loncong
- lcf – Lubu
- liw – Col
- max – North Moluccan Malay
- meo – Kedah Malay
- mfa – Pattani Malay
- mfb – Bangka
- min – Minangkabau
- mqg – Kota Bangun Kutai Malay
- msi – Sabah Malay
- mui – Musi
- orn – Orang Kanaq
- ors – Orang Seletar
- pel – Pekal
- pse – Central Malay
- tmw – Temuan
- urk – Urak Lawoi'
- vkk – Kaur
- vkt – Tenggarong Kutai Malay
- xmm – Manado Malay
- zlm – Malay (individual language)
- zmi – Negeri Sembilan Malay
- zsm – Standard Malay

The following code was previously part of msa:

- mly – Malay (individual language) (Split into Standard Malay [zsm], Haji [hji], Papuan Malay [pmy], and Malay [zlm] on 18 February 2008)

In addition, there is an individual code not part of this macrolanguage because it is categorized as a historical language:

- omy – Old Malay

==== mwr ====
mwr is the ISO 639-3 language code for Marwari. There are six individual language codes assigned:

- dhd – Dhundari
- mtr – Mewari
- mve – Marwari (Pakistan)
- rwr – Marwari (India)
- swv – Shekhawati
- wry – Merwari

==== nep ====
nep is the ISO 639-3 language code for Nepali (macrolanguage). Its ISO 639-1 code is ne. There are two individual language codes assigned:

- dty – Dotyali
- npi – Nepali (individual language)

==== nor ====
nor is the ISO 639-3 language code for Norwegian. Its ISO 639-1 code is no. There are two individual language codes assigned:

- nno – Norwegian Nynorsk
- nob – Norwegian Bokmål

==== oji ====
oji is the ISO 639-3 language code for Ojibwa. Its ISO 639-1 code is oj. There are seven individual language codes assigned:

- ciw – Chippewa
- ojb – Northwestern Ojibwa
- ojc – Central Ojibwa
- ojg – Eastern Ojibwa
- ojs – Severn Ojibwa
- ojw – Western Ojibwa
- otw – Ottawa

In addition, there are three closely associated individual codes:

- alq – Algonquin language (part of the Ojibwe language group but not included under the oji macrolanguage designation)
- pot – Potawatomi language (formerly part of the Ojibwe language group and not included under the oji macrolanguage designation)
- crg – Michif language (Cree-French mixed language with strong influences from Ojibwe language group and not included under the oji macrolanguage designation)

In addition, there are two other languages without individual codes closely associated, but not part of, this macrolanguage code:

- Broken Ojibwa (pidgin language used until the end of the 19th century)
- Bungee language (mixed language of Cree, Ojibwa, French, English, Assiniboine and Scottish Gaelic)

==== ori ====
ori is the ISO 639-3 language code for Oriya (macrolanguage). Its ISO 639-1 code is or. There are two individual language codes assigned:

- ory – Odia
- spv – Sambalpuri

==== orm ====
orm is the ISO 639-3 language code for Oromo. Its ISO 639-1 code is om. There are four individual language codes assigned:

- gax – Borana-Arsi-Guji Oromo
- gaz – West Central Oromo
- hae – Eastern Oromo
- orc – Orma

=== paa–zzz ===
==== pus ====
pus is the ISO 639-3 language code for Pashto. Its ISO 639-1 code is ps. There are three individual language codes assigned:

- pbt – Southern Pashto
- pbu – Northern Pashto
- pst – Central Pashto

==== que ====
que is the ISO 639-3 language code for Quechua. Its ISO 639-1 code is qu. There are forty-three individual language codes assigned:

- qub – Huallaga Huánuco Quechua
- qud – Calderón Highland Quichua
- quf – Lambayeque Quechua
- qug – Chimborazo Highland Quichua
- quh – South Bolivian Quechua
- quk – Chachapoyas Quechua
- qul – North Bolivian Quechua
- qup – Southern Pastaza Quechua
- qur – Yanahuanca Pasco Quechua
- qus – Santiago del Estero Quichua
- quw – Tena Lowland Quichua
- qux – Yauyos Quechua
- quy – Ayacucho Quechua
- quz – Cusco Quechua
- qva – Ambo-Pasco Quechua
- qvc – Cajamarca Quechua
- qve – Eastern Apurímac Quechua
- qvh – Huamalíes-Dos de Mayo Huánuco Quechua
- qvi – Imbabura Highland Quichua
- qvj – Loja Highland Quichua
- qvl – Cajatambo North Lima Quechua
- qvm – Margos-Yarowilca-Lauricocha Quechua
- qvn – North Junín Quechua
- qvo – Napo Lowland Quechua
- qvp – Pacaraos Quechua
- qvs – San Martín Quechua
- qvw – Huaylla Wanca Quechua
- qvz – Northern Pastaza Quichua
- qwa – Corongo Ancash Quechua
- qwc – Classical Quechua
- qwh – Huaylas Ancash Quechua
- qws – Sihuas Ancash Quechua
- qxa – Chiquián Ancash Quechua
- qxc – Chincha Quechua
- qxh – Panao Huánuco Quechua
- qxl – Salasaca Highland Quichua
- qxn – Northern Conchucos Ancash Quechua
- qxo – Southern Conchucos Ancash Quechua
- qxp – Puno Quechua
- qxr – Cañar Highland Quichua
- qxt – Santa Ana de Tusi Pasco Quechua
- qxu – Arequipa-La Unión Quechua
- qxw – Jauja Wanca Quechua

The following code was previously part of que:

- cqu – Chilean Quechua (Moved to code "quh" on 15 January 2016)

==== raj ====
raj is the ISO 639-3 language code for Rajasthani. There are six individual language codes assigned:

- bgq – Bagri
- gda – Gade Lohar
- gju – Gujari
- hoj – Hadothi
- mup – Malvi
- wbr – Wagdi

==== rom ====
rom is the ISO 639-3 language code for Romany. There are seven individual language codes assigned:

- rmc – Carpathian Romani
- rmf – Kalo Finnish Romani
- rml – Baltic Romani
- rmn – Balkan Romani
- rmo – Sinte Romani
- rmw – Welsh Romani
- rmy – Vlax Romani

In addition, there are nine individual codes not part of this macrolanguage but they are categorized as mixed languages:

- emx – Erromintxela
- rge – Romano-Greek
- rmd – Traveller Danish
- rme – Angloromani
- rmg – Traveller Norwegian
- rmi – Lomavren
- rmr – Caló
- rmu – Tavringer Romani
- rsb – Romano-Serbian

==== san ====
san is the ISO 639-3 language code for Sanskrit. Its ISO 639-1 code is sa. As of 2025, it's the only macrolanguage with language type as Historical. There are two individual language codes assigned:

- cls – Classical Sanskrit
- vsn – Vedic Sanskrit

==== sqi ====
sqi is the ISO 639-3 language code for Albanian. Its ISO 639-1 code is sq. There are four individual language codes assigned:

- aae – Arbëreshë Albanian
- aat – Arvanitika Albanian
- aln – Gheg Albanian
- als – Tosk Albanian

==== srd ====
srd is the ISO 639-3 language code for Sardinian. Its ISO 639-1 code is sc. There are four individual language codes assigned:

- sdc – Sassarese Sardinian
- sdn – Gallurese Sardinian
- src – Logudorese Sardinian
- sro – Campidanese Sardinian

==== swa ====
swa is the ISO 639-3 language code for Swahili. Its ISO 639-1 code is sw. There are two individual language codes assigned:

- swc – Congo Swahili
- swh – Swahili (individual language)

==== syr ====
syr is the ISO 639-3 language code for Syriac. There are two individual language codes assigned:

- aii – Assyrian Neo-Aramaic
- cld – Chaldean Neo-Aramaic

==== tmh ====
tmh is the ISO 639-3 language code for Tamashek. There are four individual language codes assigned:

- taq – Tamasheq
- thv – Tahaggart Tamahaq
- thz – Tayart Tamajeq
- ttq – Tawallammat Tamajaq

==== uzb ====
uzb is the ISO 639-3 language code for Uzbek. Its ISO 639-1 code is uz. There are two individual language codes assigned:

- uzn – Northern Uzbek
- uzs – Southern Uzbek

==== yid ====
yid is the ISO 639-3 language code for Yiddish. Its ISO 639-1 code is yi. There are two individual language codes assigned:

- ydd – Eastern Yiddish
- yih – Western Yiddish

==== zap ====
zap is the ISO 639-3 language code for Zapotec. There are fifty-eight individual language codes assigned.

- zaa – Sierra de Juárez Zapotec
- zab – Western Tlacolula Valley Zapotec
- zac – Ocotlán Zapotec
- zad – Cajonos Zapotec
- zae – Yareni Zapotec
- zaf – Ayoquesco Zapotec
- zai – Isthmus Zapotec
- zam – Miahuatlán Zapotec
- zao – Ozolotepec Zapotec
- zaq – Aloápam Zapotec
- zar – Rincón Zapotec
- zas – Santo Domingo Albarradas Zapotec
- zat – Tabaa Zapotec
- zav – Yatzachi Zapotec
- zaw – Mitla Zapotec
- zax – Xadani Zapotec
- zca – Coatecas Altas Zapotec
- zcd – Las Delicias Zapotec
- zoo – Asunción Mixtepec Zapotec
- zpa – Lachiguiri Zapotec
- zpb – Yautepec Zapotec
- zpc – Choapan Zapotec
- zpd – Southeastern Ixtlán Zapotec
- zpe – Petapa Zapotec
- zpf – San Pedro Quiatoni Zapotec
- zpg – Guevea De Humboldt Zapotec
- zph – Totomachapan Zapotec
- zpi – Santa María Quiegolani Zapotec
- zpj – Quiavicuzas Zapotec
- zpk – Tlacolulita Zapotec
- zpl – Lachixío Zapotec
- zpm – Mixtepec Zapotec
- zpn – Santa Inés Yatzechi Zapotec
- zpo – Amatlán Zapotec
- zpp – El Alto Zapotec
- zpq – Zoogocho Zapotec
- zpr – Santiago Xanica Zapotec
- zps – Coatlán Zapotec
- zpt – San Vicente Coatlán Zapotec
- zpu – Yalálag Zapotec
- zpv – Chichicapan Zapotec
- zpw – Zaniza Zapotec
- zpx – San Baltazar Loxicha Zapotec
- zpy – Mazaltepec Zapotec
- zpz – Texmelucan Zapotec
- zsr – Southern Rincon Zapotec
- zte – Elotepec Zapotec
- ztg – Xanaguía Zapotec
- ztl – Lapaguía-Guivini Zapotec
- ztm – San Agustín Mixtepec Zapotec
- ztn – Santa Catarina Albarradas Zapotec
- ztp – Loxicha Zapotec
- ztq – Quioquitani-Quierí Zapotec
- zts – Tilquiapan Zapotec
- ztt – Tejalapan Zapotec
- ztu – Güilá Zapotec
- ztx – Zaachila Zapotec
- zty – Yatee Zapotec

The following codes were previously part of zap:

- ztc – Lachirioag Zapotec (Moved to Yatee Zapotec [zty] on 18 July 2007)

In addition, there is an individual code not part of this macrolanguage because it is categorized as a historical language:

- xzp – Ancient Zapotec

==== zha ====
zha is the ISO 639-3 language code for Zhuang. Its ISO 639-1 code is za. There are sixteen individual language codes assigned:

- zch – Central Hongshuihe Zhuang
- zeh – Eastern Hongshuihe Zhuang
- zgb – Guibei Zhuang
- zgm – Minz Zhuang
- zgn – Guibian Zhuang
- zhd – Dai Zhuang
- zhn – Nong Zhuang
- zlj – Liujiang Zhuang
- zln – Lianshan Zhuang
- zlq – Liuqian Zhuang
- zqe – Qiubei Zhuang
- zyb – Yongbei Zhuang
- zyg – Yang Zhuang
- zyj – Youjiang Zhuang
- zyn – Yongnan Zhuang
- zzj – Zuojiang Zhuang

The following codes were previously part of zha:

- ccx – Northern Zhuang (Split into Guibian Zh [zgn], Liujiang Zh [zlj], Qiubei Zh [zqe], Guibei Zh [zgb], Youjiang Zh [zyj], Central Hongshuihe Zh [zch], Eastern Hongshuihe Zh [zeh], Liuqian Zh [zlq], Yongbei Zh [zyb], and Lianshan Zh [zln]. on 14 January 2008)
- ccy – Southern Zhuang (Split into Nong Zhuang [zhn], Yang Zhuang [zyg], Yongnan Zhuang [zyn], Zuojiang Zhuang [zzj], and Dai Zhuang [zhd] on 18 July 2007)

==== zho ====
zho is the ISO 639-3 language code for Chinese. Its ISO 639-1 code is zh. There are nineteen individual language codes assigned, most of which are not actually languages but rather groups of Sinitic languages distinguished by isoglosses:

- cdo – Min Dong Chinese
- cjy – Jinyu Chinese
- cmn – Mandarin Chinese
- cnp – Northern Ping Chinese
- cpx – Pu-Xian Chinese
- csp – Southern Ping Chinese
- czh – Huizhou Chinese
- czo – Min Zhong Chinese
- gan – Gan Chinese
- hak – Hakka Chinese
- hnm – Hainanese
- hsn – Xiang Chinese
- luh – Leizhou Chinese
- lzh – Literary Chinese
- mnp – Min Bei Chinese
- nan – Min Nan Chinese
- sjc – Shaojiang Chinese
- wuu – Wu Chinese
- yue – Yue Chinese

Although the Dungan language (dng) is a dialect of Mandarin, it is not listed under Chinese in ISO 639-3 due to separate historical and cultural development.

ISO 639 also lists codes for Old Chinese (och) and Late Middle Chinese (ltc)). They are not listed under Chinese in ISO 639-3 because they are categorized as ancient and historical languages, respectively.

==== zza ====
zza is the ISO 639-3 language code for Zaza. There are two individual language codes assigned:

- diq – Dimli (individual language)
- kiu – Kirmanjki (individual language)

== See also ==
- Microlanguage
