= Malay language =

Austronesian language

Malay
- Bahasa Melayu بهاس ملايو
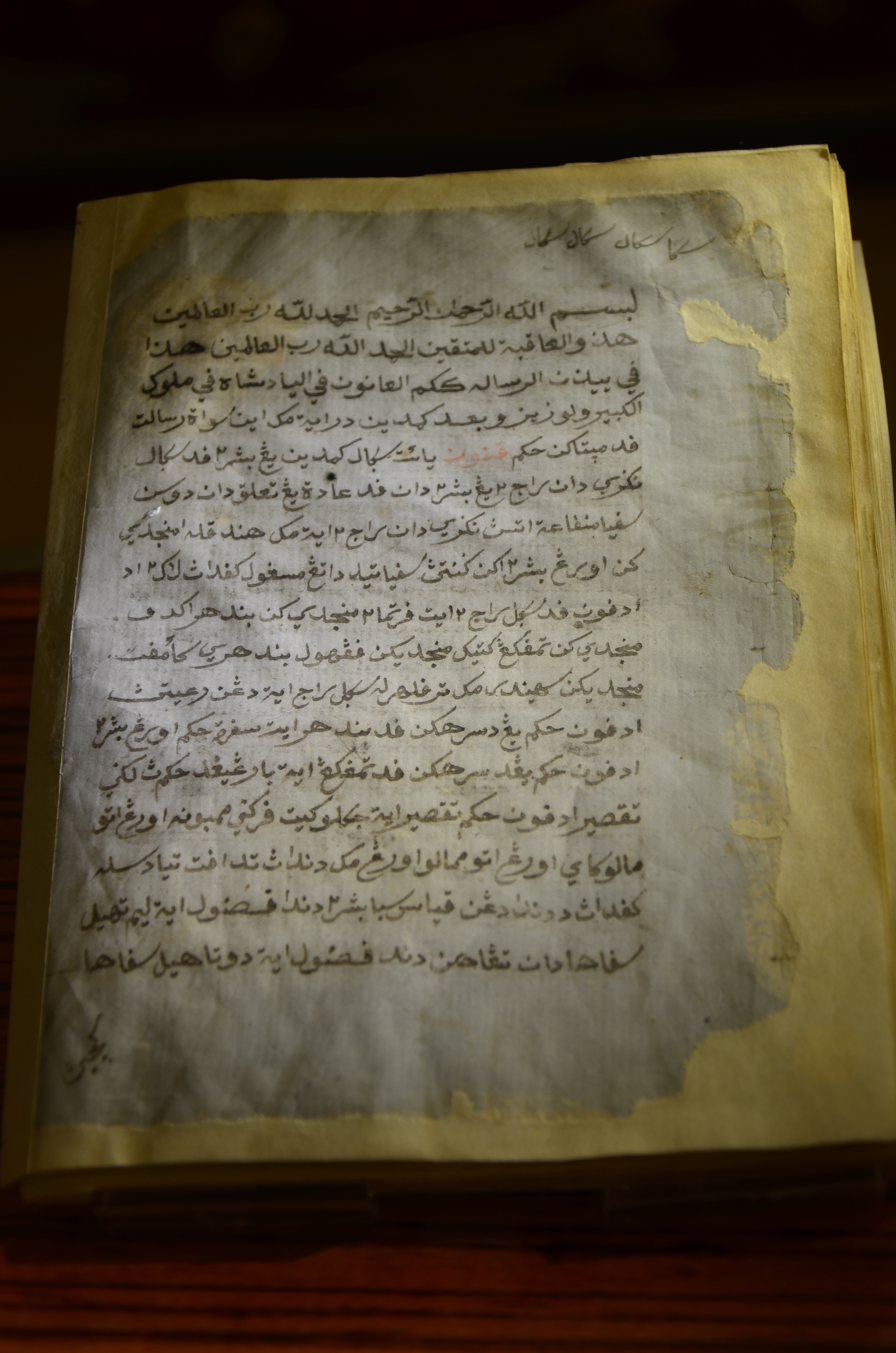
- A manuscript of the Hukum Kanun Melaka a primary legal text in Classical Malay, written in Jawi script.
- Pronunciation: [baˈha.sa məˈla.ju]
- Native to: Brunei, Christmas Island, Cocos (Keeling) Islands, Timor-Leste, Indonesia, Malaysia, Singapore, Southeast Philippines, South Thailand
- Ethnicity: Malays; Various ethnic groups in Brunei, Indonesia, Malaysia and Singapore; (see also Malayophones)
- Speakers: L1: 90 million, perhaps 125 million including local Malay (2020–2023); L2: 180 million (2020)
- Language family: Austronesian: Malayo-Polynesian; Malayo-Sumbawan (?); Malayic; Malay
- Early forms: Proto-Austronesian: Proto-Malayo-Polynesian; Proto-Malayic; Old Malay; Classical Malay; Pre-Modern Malay
- Standard forms: Standard Malay (Malaysian Malay); Indonesian
- Writing system: Latin (Malay alphabet); Arabic (Jawi script); Arabic (Pegon script) (in Indonesia); Thai alphabet (in Thailand); Malay Braille Historically: Pallava script, Kawi script, Ulu scripts, Rejang script, Hebrew script, Gangga script
- Signed forms: Manually Coded Malay

Official status
- Official language in: Brunei; Indonesia (as Indonesian); Malaysia; Singapore; UNESCO (as Indonesian)
- Recognised minority language in: East Timor (beside Dili Malay, Indonesian used as a working language alongside English, and a trade language with Indonesia); Indonesia (beside the national standard of Indonesian, Local Malay enjoys the status of a regional language in Sumatra and Kalimantan); Sri Lanka (as Sri Lankan Malay); Thailand (as Pattani Malay, Syburi Malay, and Bangkok Malay)
- Regulated by: Agency for Language Development and Cultivation in Indonesia; Institute of Language and Literature in Malaysia; Language and Literature Bureau in Brunei; Malay Language Council in Singapore; MABBIM (a trilateral joint venture)

Language codes
- ISO 639-1: ms
- ISO 639-2: may (B) msa (T)
- ISO 639-3: msa – inclusive code Individual codes: zlm – Malay (individual language) ind – Indonesian zsm – Standard Malay abs – Ambon Malay mbf – Baba Malay pea – Baba Indonesian mhp – Balinese Malay bjn – Banjarese mfb – Bangka btj – Bacan bew – Betawi bve – Berau kxd – Brunei Malay ccm – Chetty Malay coa – Cocos Malay liw – Col goq – Gorap hji – Haji jax – Jambi Malay vkk – Kaur meo – Kedah Malay mfa – Kelantan-Pattani Malay kvr – Kerinci mqg – Kota Bangun Kutai mkn – Kupang Malay mfp – Makassar Malay xmm – Manado Malay min – Minangkabau mui – Musi zmi – Negeri Sembilan max – North Moluccan Malay pmy – Papuan Malay pel – Pekal msi – Sabah Malay sci – Sri Lanka Malay language pse – South Barisan Malay vkt – Tenggarong Kutai Malay
- Glottolog: nucl1806
- Linguasphere: 31-MFA-a
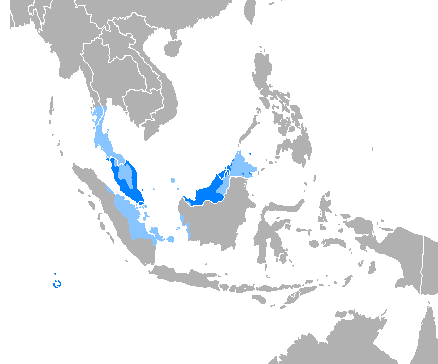
- Malay language sphere: The regions where Malay language is official and spoken predominantly The regions where Malay language spoken and recognized as minority language

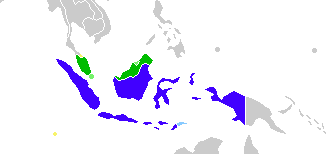
- Areas where Malay is spoken: Indonesia Malaysia Singapore and Brunei, where Standard Malay is an official language East Timor, where Dili Malay is a Malay creole language and Indonesian is used as a working language Southern Thailand and the Cocos Isl., where other varieties of Malay are spoken

Malay (UK: /məˈleɪ/ mə-LAY; endonym: Bahasa Melayu, Jawi script: بهاس ملايو) is an Austronesian pluricentric macrolanguage native to several islands of Maritime Southeast Asia and the Malay Peninsula on mainland Asia. The language is an official language of Brunei, Malaysia, and Singapore, where the standardised forms are known as Standard Malay. Within the Malay language family, another standardised form which is known as Indonesian is the official language in Indonesia and also one of the working languages of Timor-Leste. Malay is the ethnic language of Malays in Sumatra, Borneo and surrounding islands in Indonesia, the Malay Peninsula, southeast Philippines, southern Thailand, and the Southern Province of Sri Lanka. Altogether, it is spoken as a first language by about 80 million people and as a first or second language by close to 300 million.

The language is pluricentric and a macrolanguage, i.e., a group of mutually intelligible speech varieties, or dialect continuum, that have no traditional name in common, and which may be considered distinct languages by their speakers. Several varieties of it are standardised as the national language (bahasa kebangsaan or bahasa nasional) of several nation states with various official names: in Malaysia, it is designated as either Bahasa Melayu ("Malay language") or in some instances, Bahasa Malaysia ("Malaysian language"); in Singapore and Brunei, it is called Bahasa Melayu ("Malay language") where it in the latter country refers to a formal standard variety set apart from its own vernacular dialect; (Note: also described as "Standard Brunei Malay") in Indonesia, an autonomous normative variety called bahasa Indonesia ("Indonesian language") is designated the bahasa persatuan/pemersatu ("unifying language" or lingua franca) whereas the term "Malay" (bahasa Melayu) refers to vernacular varieties of Malay indigenous to areas of Central to Southern Sumatra and West Kalimantan as the ethnic languages of Malay in Indonesia. (Note: Since the standardised varieties of Indonesia, Malaysia, Brunei and Singapore are structurally largely identical and mostly differ in lexicon and to a lesser degree in phonetic details, the umbrella terms "Malay/Indonesian" or "Malay-Indonesian" are often used in the linguistic literature when discussing the structure or history of the language.)

Classical Malay, also called Court Malay, was the literary standard of the pre-colonial Malacca and Johor Sultanates and so the language is sometimes called Malacca, Johor or Riau Malay (or various combinations of those names) to distinguish it from the various other Malayic languages. According to Ethnologue 16, several of the Malayic varieties they currently list as separate languages, including the Orang Asli varieties of the Malay Peninsula, are so closely related to standard Malay that they may prove to be dialects. There are also several Malay trade and creole languages (e.g. Ambonese Malay) based on a lingua franca derived from Classical Malay as well as Makassar Malay, which appears to be a mixed language.

== Origin ==
Malay historical linguists agree on the likelihood of the Malayic homeland being in western Borneo. A form known as Proto-Malayic was spoken in Borneo at least by 1000 BCE, it has been argued to be the ancestral language of all subsequent Malayic languages. Its ancestor, Proto-Malayo-Polynesian, a descendant of the Proto-Austronesian language, began to break up by at least 2000 BCE, possibly as a result of the southward expansion of Austronesian peoples into Maritime Southeast Asia from the island of Taiwan.

== History ==
Map of the expansion of the Srivijaya empire, beginning in Palembang in the 7th century, then extending to most of Sumatra, then expanding to Bangka Belitung, Riau Islands, Malay Peninsula, Singapore, Java, Thailand, Cambodia, South Vietnam, Sarawak, Brunei, Sabah, West Kalimantan, and ended as the Melayu Kingdom in Jambi in the 13th century.

The history of the Malay language can be divided into five periods: Old Malay, the Transitional Period, Classical Malay, Late Modern Malay and Modern Malay. Old Malay is believed to be the actual ancestor of Classical Malay.

Old Malay was influenced by Sanskrit, the ancient Indo-Aryan language of India. Sanskrit loan words can be found in Old Malay vocabulary. The earliest known stone inscription in the Old Malay language was found on the island of Sumatra. Written in the Pallava variety of the Grantha alphabet, it is dated 1 May 683. Known as the Kedukan Bukit inscription, it was discovered by the Dutchman C. J. Batenburg on 29 November 1920 at Kedukan Bukit, on the banks of the Tatang River, a tributary of the Musi River, near Palembang, in what is now South Sumatra, Indonesia. The stone measures approximately 45 by 80 centimetres (18 by 31 in). For centuries, Srivijaya, a maritime empire based on the island of Sumatra from the 7th to the 11th centuries, was responsible for the spread of Old Malay throughout the Malay Peninsula and the Malay Archipelago through its expansion and economic power. Old Malay served as the lingua franca of traders and was widely used in various ports and marketplaces across the region.

The Tanjung Tanah Law was a 14th-century pre-Islamic legal text that was produced during the reign of Adityawarman (1345–1377) of the Melayu Kingdom (also known as Malayu or Dharmasraya Kingdom), a Hindu-Buddhist kingdom that arose after the end of Srivijayan rule in Sumatra. The laws were for the Minangkabau people, who today still live in the highlands of Sumatra, Indonesia.

The Terengganu Inscription Stone (Malay: Batu Bersurat Terengganu; Jawi: باتو برسورت ترڠݢانو) is a granite stele bearing an inscription in Jawi script, discovered in Terengganu, on the east coast of the Malay Peninsula (in what is now Malaysia). It is considered the earliest evidence of Classical Malay. Dated approximately to 702 AH (1303 CE), it represents the oldest known evidence of Jawi writing in the Malay world and stands as one of the earliest testimonies to the advent of Islam as a state religion in the region. The inscription contains a proclamation issued by a ruler of Terengganu, referred to as Seri Paduka Tuan, urging his subjects to uphold and propagate Islam, while outlining 10 basic Sharia laws as guidance.

Classical Malay came into widespread use as the lingua franca of the region during the Malacca Sultanate era (1402–1511), a powerful maritime kingdom strategically located along the Strait of Malacca that became a hub of international trade and Islamic learning in the region. During this period, the Malay language developed rapidly under the influence of Islamic literature, which brought about significant linguistic changes, including a massive infusion of Arabic vocabulary, as well as continued influence from Sanskrit and Tamil. This enriched form of the language came to be known as Classical Malay. It was during this time the language evolved into a form recognisable to speakers of modern Malay.

After the Capture of Malacca by the Portuguese in 1511, marking the fall of the Malacca Sultanate, the royal court re-established itself as the Johor Sultanate. The court continued to use Classical Malay as its literary and administrative language. Over time, this literary tradition became strongly associated with the territories under the sultanate, including the present-day Malaysian state of Johor and the Indonesian province of Riau Islands. As a result, many assumed that the spoken Malay of Johor and Riau was closely related to Classical Malay. However, while the literary language used in the region reflects the classical tradition, the local spoken dialects differ. The fall of Malacca led to the dispersal of Malay literary centres, as many literati and scholars sought refuge in areas outside the immediate control of European colonial powers. As a result, new Malay literary works began to emerge from Aceh, Java, Makassar, the Moluccas, Champa, and other regions.

Among the oldest surviving letters written in Malay are the letters from Sultan Abu Hayat of Ternate, in the Maluku Islands of present-day Indonesia, dated around 1521–1522. The text is addressed to the king of Portugal, following contact with Portuguese explorer Francisco Serrão. The letters show a sign of non-native usage, as the Ternateans used (and still use) the unrelated Ternate language, a West Papuan language, as their first language. Malay was used solely as a lingua franca for inter-ethnic communications.

The 19th century marked a period of strong Western political and commercial domination in the Malay Peninsula and the Malay Archipelago. The colonial demarcation brought by the 1824 Anglo-Dutch Treaty led to Dutch East India Company effectively colonising the East Indies in the south, while the British Empire held several colonies and protectorates in the Malay peninsula and Borneo in the north. Both colonial powers used the Malay language as a tool of centralisation and modernisation. They made use of each other's scholarly publications in developing the standardised versions of the Malay language. The flourishing of pre-modern Malay literature in the 19th century led to the rise of intellectual movements among the locals and the emergence of new communities of Malay linguists.

== Classification ==
Malay is a member of the Austronesian family of languages, which includes languages from Southeast Asia and the Pacific Ocean, with a smaller number in continental Asia. Malagasy, a geographic outlier spoken in Madagascar in the Indian Ocean, is also a member of this language family. Although these languages are not necessarily mutually intelligible to any extent, their similarities are often quite apparent. In more conservative languages like Malay, many roots have come with relatively little change from their common ancestor, Proto-Austronesian language. There are many cognates found in the languages' words for kinship, health, body parts and common animals. Numbers, especially, show remarkable similarities.

Within Austronesian, Malay is part of a cluster of numerous closely related forms of speech known as the Malayic languages, which were spread across Malaya and the Indonesian archipelago by Malay traders from Sumatra. There is disagreement as to which varieties of speech popularly called "Malay" should be considered dialects of this language, and which should be classified as distinct Malay languages. The vernacular of Brunei—Brunei Malay—for example, is not readily intelligible with the standard language, and the same is true with some lects on the Malay Peninsula such as Kedah Malay. However, both Brunei and Kedah are quite close.

== Writing system ==
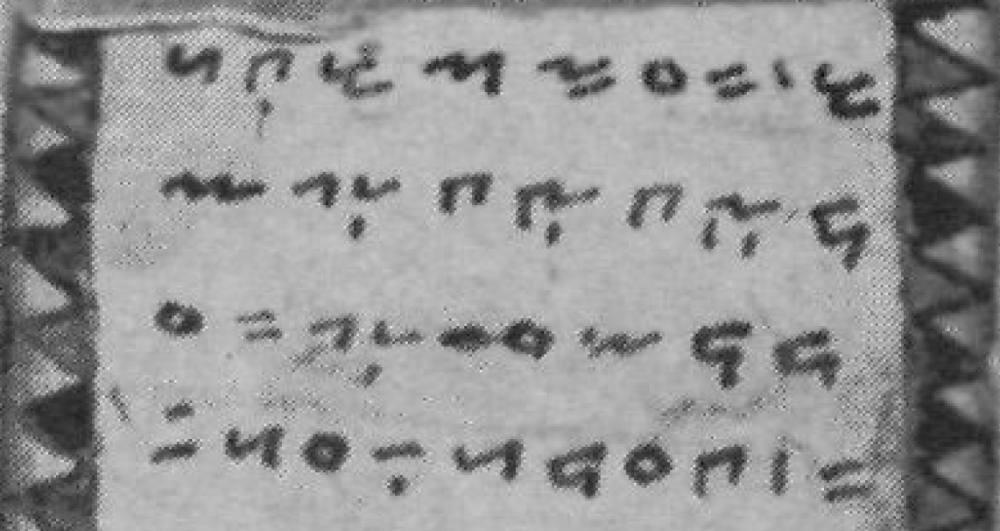
The Rencong alphabet, a native writing system found in central and South Sumatra. The text reads (Voorhoeve's spelling): "haku manangis ma / njaru ka'u ka'u di / saru tijada da / tang [hitu hadik sa]", which is translated by Voorhoeve as: "I am weeping, calling you; though called, you do not come" (hitu adik sa- is the rest of 4th line.

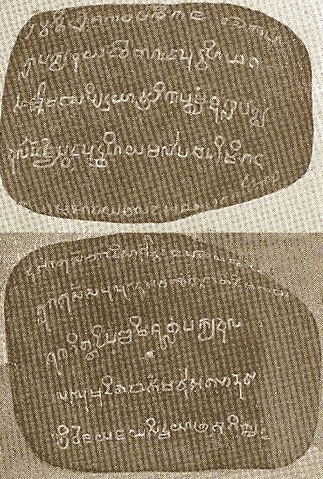
Kedukan Bukit Inscription, using Pallava alphabet, is the oldest surviving specimen of the Old Malay language in South Sumatra, Indonesia.

Malay is now written using the Latin script, known as Rumi in Brunei, Malaysia and Singapore or Latin in Indonesia, although an Arabic script called Arab Melayu or Jawi also exists. Latin script is official in Malaysia, Singapore, and Indonesia. Malay uses Hindu-Arabic numerals.

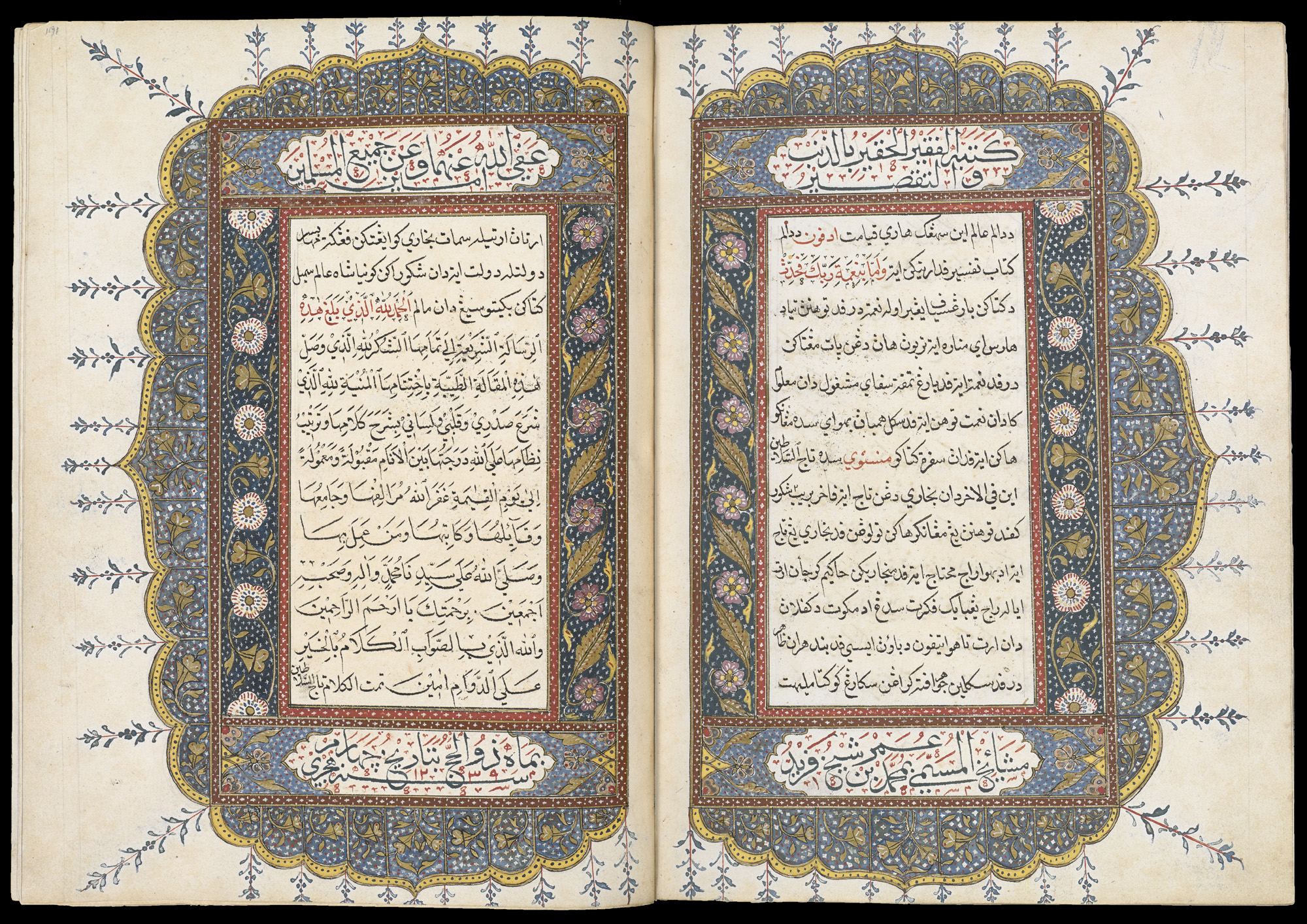
Final pages of the Taj al-Salatin, The Crown of Kings, a Malay "mirror for princes", copied by Muhammad bin Umar Syaikh Farid on 31 July 1824 CE in Penang in Jawi script. British Library

Rumi (Latin) and Jawi are co-official in Brunei and Malaysia only. Names of institutions and organisations have to use Jawi and Rumi (Latin) scripts in Brunei and some parts of Malaysia. Jawi is used fully in schools, especially the religious school, sekolah agama, which is compulsory during the afternoon for Muslim students aged from around 6–7 up to 12–14.

Efforts are currently being undertaken to preserve Jawi in Malaysia, and students taking Malay language examinations in Malaysia have the option of answering questions using Jawi.

The Latin script, however, is the most commonly used in Brunei and Malaysia, both for official and informal purposes.

Historically, Malay has been written using various scripts. Before the introduction of Arabic script in the Malay region, Malay was written using the Pallava, Kawi and Rencong scripts; these scripts are no longer frequently used, but similar scripts such as the Cham alphabet are used by the Chams of Vietnam and Cambodia. Old Malay was written using Pallava and Kawi script, as evident from several inscription stones in the Malay region. Starting from the era of kingdom of Pasai and throughout the golden age of the Malacca Sultanate, Jawi gradually replaced these scripts as the most commonly used script in the Malay region. Starting from the 17th century, under Dutch and British influence, Jawi was gradually replaced by the Rumi script.

== Extent of use ==
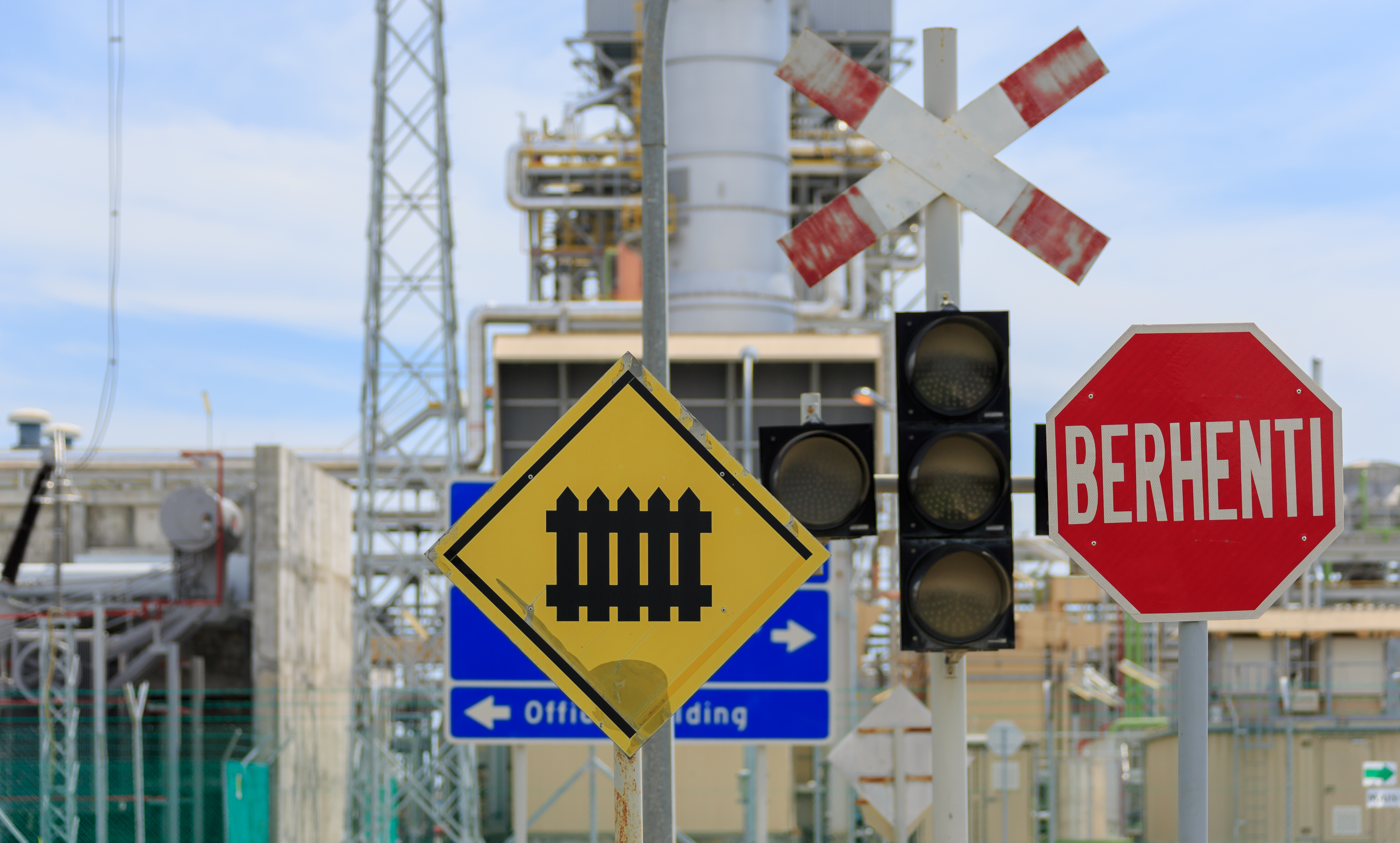
A Malay traffic sign in Malaysia

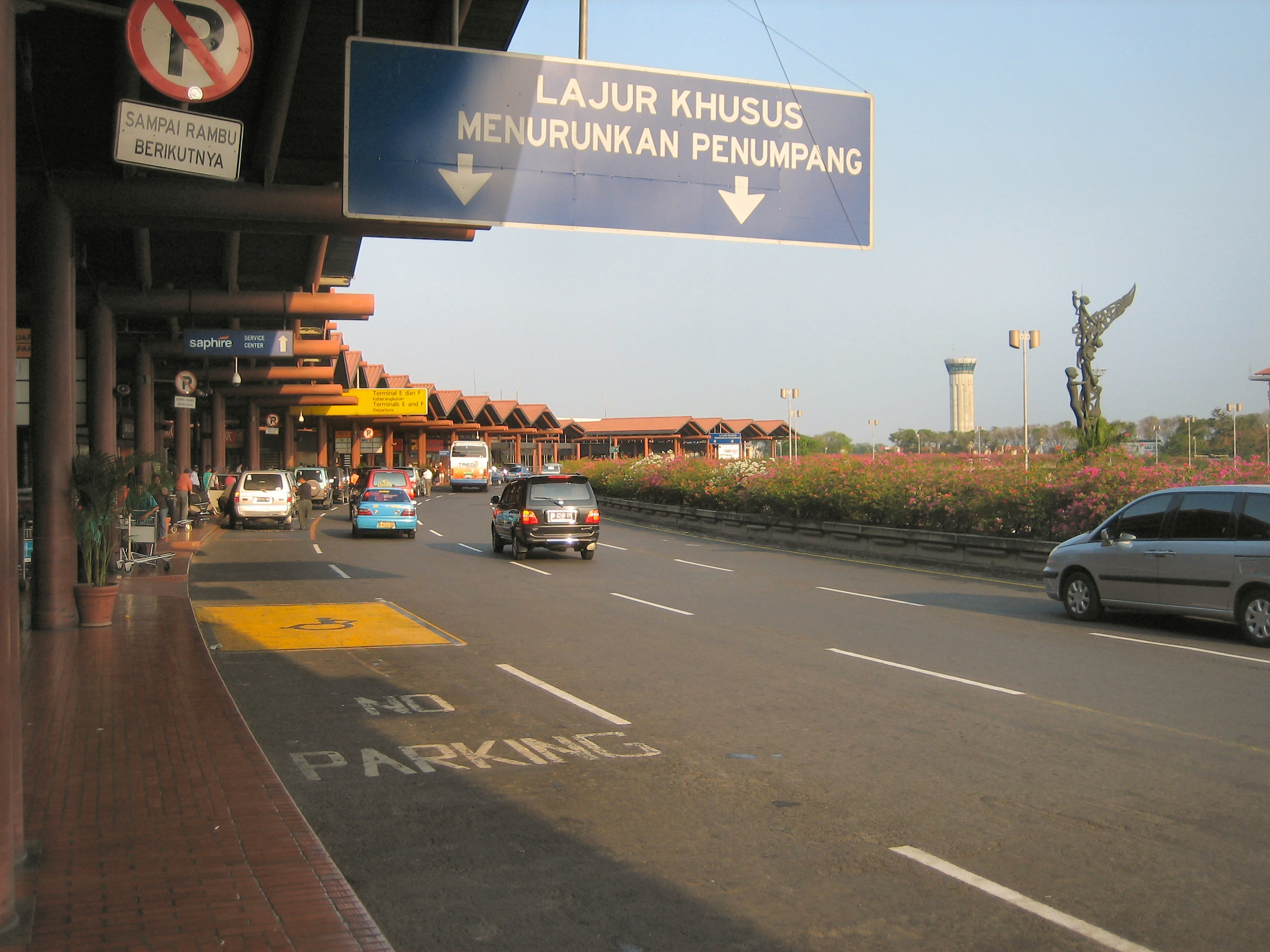
Indonesian road signs in Soekarno–Hatta International Airport. The blue sign reads "Lajur Khusus Menurunkan Penumpang" which means "Lane for dropping passengers only" and the small no-parking sign on the left reads "Sampai Rambu Berikutnya" which means "until next sign" in Indonesian.

Malay is spoken in Brunei, Indonesia, Malaysia, Timor-Leste, Singapore, southeastern Philippines and southern Thailand. Indonesian is the national language in Indonesia by Article 36 of the 1945 Constitution of the Republic of Indonesia, while "Malay" (bahasa Melayu) has been recognised as the ethnic languages of Malay in Indonesia alongside Malay-based trade and creole languages and other ethnic languages. Malaysia and Singapore use a common standard Malay. Brunei, in addition to Standard Malay, uses a distinct vernacular dialect called Brunei Malay. In Timor-Leste, Indonesian is recognised by the constitution as one of two working languages (the other being English), alongside the official languages of Tetum and Portuguese. The extent to which Malay is used in these countries varies depending on historical and cultural circumstances. Malay is the national language in Malaysia by Article 152 of the Constitution of Malaysia, and became the sole official language in Peninsular Malaysia in 1968 and in East Malaysia gradually from 1974. English continues, however, to be widely used in professional and commercial fields and in the superior courts. Other minority languages are also commonly used by the country's large ethnic minorities. The situation in Brunei is similar to that in Malaysia. In the Philippines, Indonesian is spoken by the overseas Indonesian community concentrated in Davao City. Functional phrases are taught to members of the Armed Forces of the Philippines as well as local students.

Bahasa Indonesia (Indonesian) exercises in the development of Malay as an international language as well as a language of science. The VOA and BBC use Indonesian as one of their standard language for broadcasting. In Australia, Indonesian is one of three Asian target languages, together with Japanese and Mandarin, taught in some schools as part of the Languages Other Than English programme. Indonesian has been taught in Australian schools and universities since the 1950s. Indonesian has been recognised as an official language of the General Conference of UNESCO since 2023.

== Phonology ==
=== Consonants ===
The consonants of Malaysian and also Indonesian are shown below. Non-native consonants that only occur in borrowed words, principally from Arabic, Dutch and English, are shown in brackets.

Malay consonant phonemes
		Labial	Dental/ Alveolar	Post‑alv./ Palatal	Velar	Glottal
Nasal		m	n	ɲ	ŋ	
Stop/ Affricate	voiceless	p	t	t͡ʃ	k	(ʔ)
Stop/ Affricate	voiced	b	d	d͡ʒ	ɡ	
Fricative	voiceless	(f)	s	(ʃ)	(x)	h
Fricative	voiced	(v)	(z)		(ɣ)	
Approximant	semivowel	w		j		
Approximant	lateral		l			
Trill			r			

Orthographic note: The sounds are represented orthographically by their symbols as above, except:

- /ð/ is 'z', the same as the /z/ sound (only occurs in Arabic loanwords originally containing the /ð/ sound, but the writing is not distinguished from Arabic loanwords with /z/ sound, and this sound must be learned separately by the speakers).
- /ɲ/ is 'ny'; 'n' before 'c' and 'j'
- /ŋ/ is 'ng'
- /θ/ is represented as 's', the same as the /s/ sound (only occurs in Arabic loanwords originally containing the /θ/ sound, but the writing is not distinguished from Arabic loanwords with /s/ sound, and this sound must be learned separately by the speakers). Previously (before 1972), this sound was written 'th' in Standard Malay (not Indonesian)
- the glottal stop /ʔ/ is final 'k' or an apostrophe ' (although some words have this glottal stop in the middle, such as rakyat)
- /tʃ/ is 'c'
- /dʒ/ is 'j'
- /ʃ/ is 'sy'
- /x/ is 'kh'
- /j/ is 'y'
- /q/ is 'k'

Loans from Arabic:

- Phonemes which occur only in Arabic loans may be pronounced distinctly by speakers who know Arabic. Otherwise they tend to be replaced with native sounds.

Table of borrowed Arabic consonants
Distinct	Assimilated	Example
/x/	/k/, /h/	khabar, kabar "news"
/ð/	/d/, /l/	redha, rela "good will"
/zˤ/	/l/, /z/	lohor, zuhur "noon (prayer)"
/ɣ/	/ɡ/, /r/	ghaib, raib "hidden"
/ʕ/	/ʔ/	saat, sa'at "second (time)"
/θ/	/s/	Selasa "Tuesday"
/q/	/k/	makam "grave"

=== Vowels ===
Malay originally had four vowels, but in many dialects today, including Standard Malay, it has six, with /i/ split into /i, e/ and /u/ split into /u, o/. Many words are commonly pronounced variably, with either [i, u] or [e, o], and relatively few words require a mid vowel [e, o].

Table of vowel phonemes of Standard Malay
	Front	Central	Back
Close	i		u
Mid	e	ə	o
Open		a	

Orthographic note: both /e/ and /ə/ are written with ⟨e⟩. Orthographic /e, o/ are relatively rare, so the letter ⟨e⟩ usually represents /ə/. There are some homographs; for example, perang is used for both /pəraŋ/ "war" and /peraŋ ~ piraŋ/ "blond". (In Indonesia, "blond" is written as pirang instead of perang.)

Some analyses regard /ai, au, oi/ as diphthongs. However, [ai] and [au] can only occur in open syllables, such as cukai ("excise") and pulau ("island"). Words with a phonetic diphthong in a closed syllable, such as baik ("good") and laut ("sea"), are actually two syllables. An alternative analysis therefore treats the phonetic diphthongs [ai], [au] and [oi] as a sequence of a monophthong plus an approximant: /aj/, /aw/ and /oj/ respectively.

There is a rule of vowel harmony: the non-open vowels /i, e, u, o/ in bisyllabic words must agree in height, so hidung ("nose") is allowed but *hedung is not.

Comparison of several standard pronunciations of Malay–Indonesian
	Example	Standard Pronunciation		
	Example	Indonesian–Baku	Johor–Riau (Piawai)	Northern Peninsular
⟨a⟩ in final open syllable	⟨kereta⟩	/a/	/ə/	/a/
⟨i⟩ in final closed syllable with final ⟨n⟩ and ⟨ng⟩	⟨kambing⟩	/i/	/e/	/i/
⟨i⟩ in final closed syllable with other final consonants	⟨itik⟩	/i/	/e/	/e/
⟨u⟩ in final closed syllable with final ⟨n⟩ and ⟨ng⟩	⟨tahun⟩	/u/	/o/	/u/
⟨u⟩ in final closed syllable with other final consonants	⟨lumpur⟩	/u/	/o/	/o/
final ⟨r⟩	⟨lumpur⟩	/r/	silent	/r/

Study by Uri Tadmor which was published in 2003 shows that mutation of ⟨a⟩ in final open syllable is an areal feature. Specifically, it is an areal feature of Western Austronesia. Uri Tadmor classify those types into four groups as below.

Final /a/ mutation in Malay-Indonesian dialects and nearby Austronesian languages
Types	Phonemes	"Malay" homeland	Native languages area
[a] (origin)	[a]	Kedah, Brunei	Arekan (eg. Tengger), Sarawak, Sabah, Kalimantan (except Pontianak), East Indonesia
Raised	[ə], [ɨ]	Johor, Pontianak, Tanah Abang (Jakarta)	Bali
Rounded	[o], [ɔ]	Pattani, Palembang	Minangkabau, Mataraman (eg. Yogyakarta)
Fronted	[ɛ], [e]	Perak, Jakarta, Sambas	

== Grammar ==
Malay is an agglutinative language, and new words are formed by three methods: attaching affixes onto a root word (affixation), formation of a compound word (composition), or repetition of words or portions of words (reduplication). Nouns and verbs may be basic roots, but frequently they are derived from other words by means of prefixes, suffixes and circumfixes.

Malay does not make use of grammatical gender, and there are only a few words that use natural gender; the same word is used for 'he' and 'she' which is dia or for 'his' and 'her' which is dia punya. There is no grammatical plural in Malay either; thus orang may mean either 'person' or 'people'. Verbs are not inflected for person or number, and they are not marked for tense; tense is instead denoted by time adverbs (such as 'yesterday') or by other tense indicators, such as sudah 'already' and belum 'not yet'. On the other hand, there is a complex system of verb affixes to render nuances of meaning and to denote voice or intentional and accidental moods.

Malay does not have a grammatical subject in the sense that English does. In intransitive clauses, the noun comes before the verb. When there is both an agent and an object, these are separated by the verb (OVA or AVO), with the difference encoded in the voice of the verb. OVA, commonly but inaccurately called "passive", is the basic and most common word order.

== Vocabulary ==
The Malay language has many words borrowed from Arabic (in particular religious terms), Sanskrit, Tamil, certain Sinitic languages, Persian (due to historical status of Malay Archipelago as a trading hub), and more recently, Portuguese, Dutch and English (in particular many scientific and technological terms). Indonesian has inclination toward Sanskrit in formulation of new words due to extensive Javanese and Balinese speaking community, while Malaysian and Bruneian Malay prefer Arabic as source for neologism due to acceptance of Islamic Arabic practices. Arabic in Indonesian tends to reside in the (Islamic) religious sphere. The presence of Sanskritised neologism in Malaysian and Bruneian Malay is a result of "importation" from Indonesian. Terminology for various subjects such as administration, business, and law was derived from the languages of respective colonial master, those are Dutch for Indonesian and English for Malaysian and Bruneian Malay. Although the rule for scientific terms development is agreed, the result can be differ because of the difference in traditional vocabulary (such as Dutch vs English and Sanskritic Javanese vs Arabised Malay) and the loan-shift difference on semantics and grammatical feature choice. The divergence between Indonesian and "Standard" Malay are systemic in nature and, to a certain extent, contribute to the way the two sets of speakers understand and react to the world, and are more far reaching with a discernible cognitive gap than the difference between dialects.

== Varieties and related languages ==
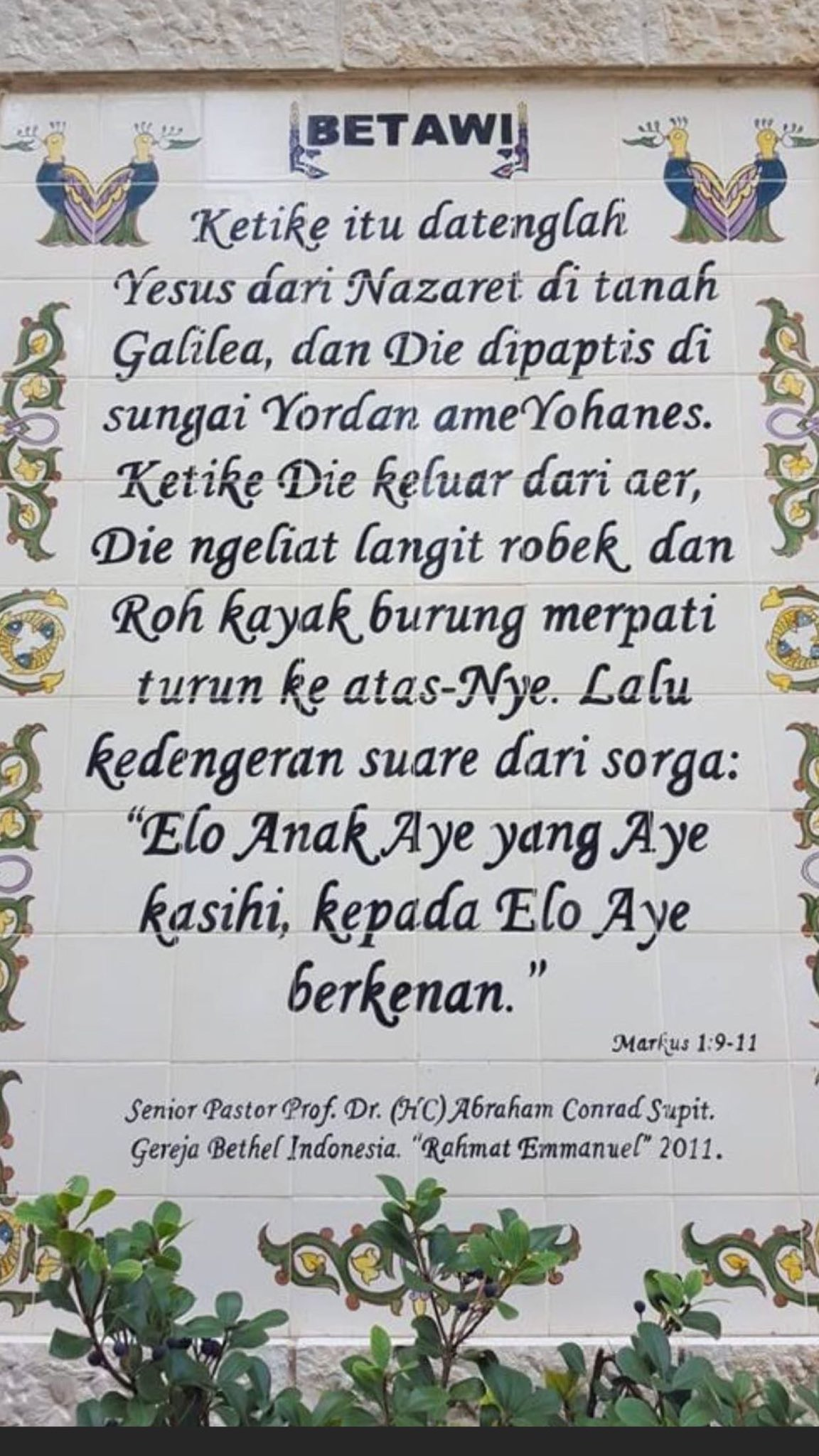
Mural of Mark 1:9-11 written in Betawi language

There is a group of closely related languages spoken by Malays and related peoples across Brunei, Indonesia, Malaysia, Singapore, Southern Thailand, Timor-Leste, and the far southern parts of the Philippines. They have traditionally been classified as Malay, Para-Malay, and Aboriginal Malay, but this reflects geography and ethnicity rather than a proper linguistic classification. The Malayic languages are mutually intelligible to varying extents, though the distinction between language and dialect is unclear in many cases.

Para-Malay includes the Malayic languages of Sumatra. They are: Minangkabau, Central Malay (Bengkulu), Pekal, Talang Mamak, Musi (Palembang), Negeri Sembilan (Malaysia), and Duano'.

The other Malayic languages, included in neither of these groups, are associated with the expansion of the Malays across the archipelago. They include Riau-Johor Malay (Malaysian and Indonesian), Kedah Malay, Brunei Malay, Berau Malay, Bangka Malay, Jambi Malay, Kutai Malay, Terengganu Malay, Riau Malay, Loncong, Pattani Malay, Bacan Malay, and Banjarese. Menterap may belong here.

There are also several Malay-based creole languages, such as Betawi Malay, Cocos Malay, Makassar Malay, Ambonese Malay, Dili Malay, Kupang Malay, Manado Malay, Papuan Malay, Thousand Islands Malay, Larantuka Malay, Alor Malay, Balinese Malay, Sri Lankan Malay and Sabah Malay, which may be more or less distinct from standard (Malaccan) Malay.

Due to the early settlement of a Cape Malay community in Cape Town, who are now known as Coloureds, numerous Classical Malay words were brought into Afrikaans.

=== Usages ===
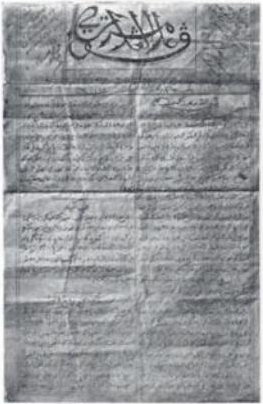
The Alamat Langkapuri from British Ceylon (present-day Sri Lanka). Initially published between 1869 and 1870 and written in Jawi script, it is noted to be among the first Malay-language newspaper. The readership consist of the Malay-diaspora in Ceylon as well as in the Malay archipelago.

The extent to which Malay and related Malayan languages are used in the countries where it is spoken varies depending on historical and cultural circumstances. Malay is the national language in Malaysia by Article 152 of the Constitution of Malaysia, and became the sole official language in West Malaysia in 1968, and in East Malaysia gradually from 1974. English continues, however, to be widely used in professional and commercial fields and in the superior courts. Other minority languages are also commonly used by the country's large ethnic minorities. The situation in Brunei is similar to that of Malaysia.

In Singapore, Malay was historically the lingua franca among people of different nationalities. Although this has largely given way to English, Malay still retains the status of national language and the national anthem, Majulah Singapura, is entirely in Malay. In addition, parade commands in the military, police and civil defence are given only in Malay.

Most residents of the five southernmost provinces of Thailand—a region that, for the most part, used to be part of an ancient Malay kingdom called Pattani—speak a dialect of Malay called Yawi (not to be confused with Jawi), which is similar to Kelantanese Malay, but the language has no official status or recognition.

Owing to earlier contact with the Philippines, Malay words—such as dalam hati (sympathy), luwalhati (glory), tengah hari (midday), sedap (delicious)—have evolved and been integrated into Tagalog and other Philippine languages. This linguistic exchange reflects broader patterns of cultural interaction and mutual influence that have contributed to shared concepts of social values and inclusion within Philippine society.

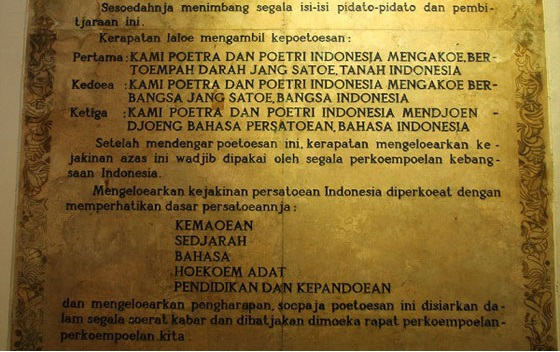
The Youth Pledge was the result of the Second Youth Congress held in Batavia in October 1928. On the last pledge, there was an affirmation of Indonesian language as a unifying language throughout the archipelago.

Indonesian speaker

By contrast, Indonesian has successfully become the lingua franca for its disparate islands and ethnic groups, in part because the colonial language, Dutch, is no longer commonly spoken. (In East Timor, which was governed as a province of Indonesia from 1976 to 1999, Indonesian is widely spoken and recognised under its Constitution as a 'working language'.)

Malaysian speaker

Besides Indonesian, which developed from the Riau Malay dialect, there are many Malay varieties spoken in Indonesia; they are divided into western and eastern groups. Western Malay dialects are predominantly spoken in Sumatra and Borneo, which itself is divided into Bornean and Sumatran Malay; some of the most widely spoken Sumatran Malay dialects are Riau Malay, Langkat, Palembang Malay and Jambi Malay. Minangkabau, Kerinci and Bengkulu are believed to be Sumatran Malay descendants. Meanwhile, the Jakarta dialect (known as Betawi) also belongs to the western Malay group.

A young man speaks Kedah Malay.

The eastern varieties, classified either as dialects or creoles, are spoken in the eastern part of the Malay or Nusantara archipelago and include Makassar Malay, Manado Malay, Ambonese Malay, North Moluccan Malay, Kupang Malay, Dili Malay, and Papuan Malay.

The differences among both groups are quite observable. For example, the word kita means 'we, us' in western, but means 'I, me' in Manado, whereas 'we, us" in Manado is torang and Ambon katong (originally abbreviated from Malay kita orang 'we people'). Another difference is the lack of possessive pronouns (and suffixes) in eastern dialects. Manado uses the verb pe and Ambon pu (from Malay punya 'to have') to mark possession. So 'my name' and 'our house" are translated in western Malay as namaku and rumah kita but kita pe nama and torang pe rumah in Manado and beta pu nama, katong pu rumah in Ambon dialect.

The pronunciation may vary in western dialects, especially the pronunciation of words ending in the vowel 'a'. For example, in some parts of Malaysia and in Singapore, kita (inclusive 'we, us, our') is pronounced as /kitə/, in Kelantan and Southern Thailand as /kitɔ/, in Riau as /kita/, in Palembang as /kito/, in Betawi and Perak as /kitɛ/ and in Kedah and Perlis as /kitɑ/.

Batavian and eastern dialects are sometimes regarded as Malay creole, because the speakers are not ethnically Malay.

== Examples ==
Despite that statement of "all Malay speakers should be able to understand either of the translations below, which differ mostly in their choice of wording," the divergence between Indonesian and "Standard" Malay are systemic in nature and, to a certain extent, contribute to the way the two sets of speakers understand and react to the world, and are more far reaching with a discernible cognitive gap than the difference between dialects. The words for 'article', pasal and perkara, and for 'declaration', pernyataan and perisytiharan, are specific to the Indonesian and Malaysian standards, respectively, but otherwise all the words are found in both (and even those words may be found with slightly different meanings).

Article 1 of the Universal Declaration of Human Rights
English	Malay–Indonesian	
English	Indonesian	Standard "Malay"
Universal Declaration of Human Rights	Pernyataan Umum tentang Hak Asasi Manusia (General Declaration about Human Rights)	Perisytiharan Hak Asasi Manusia Sejagat (Universal Declaration of Human Rights)
Article 1	Pasal 1	Perkara 1
All human beings are born free and equal in dignity and rights. They are endowed with reason and conscience and should act towards one another in a spirit of brotherhood.	Semua orang dilahirkan merdeka dan mempunyai martabat dan hak-hak yang sama. Mereka dikaruniai akal dan hati nurani dan hendaknya bergaul satu sama lain dalam semangat persaudaraan.	Semua manusia dilahirkan bebas dan sama rata dari segi maruah dan hak-hak. Mereka mempunyai pemikiran dan perasaan hati dan hendaklah bertindak di antara satu sama lain dengan semangat persaudaraan.
All human beings are born free and equal in dignity and rights. They are endowed with reason and conscience and should act towards one another in a spirit of brotherhood.	(All human beings are born free and have the same dignity and rights. They are endowed with reason and conscience and should get along with each other in a spirit of brotherhood.)	(All human beings are born free and are equal in dignity and rights. They have thoughts and feelings and should get along with a spirit of brotherhood.)

== See also ==
- Comparison of Standard Malay and Indonesian
- Indonesian language
- Jawi script, an Arabic alphabet for Malay
- Languages of Indonesia
- List of English words of Malay origin
- Malajoe Batawi
- Malaysian English, the English used formally in Malaysia
- Malaysian language
