= Bengkulu Malays =

Malay sub-ethnic in Bengkulu

Orang Melayu Bengkulu اورڠ ملايو بڠكولو

Total population
- 125,120

Regions with significant populations
- Indonesia (Bengkulu)

Languages
- Bengkulu Malay and Indonesian

Religion
- Islam

Related ethnic groups
- Minangkabau; Rejang; Malay; Other South Barisan Malays and indigenous peoples of Bengkulu

The Bengkulu Malays (Malay: Orang Melayu Bengkulu, Jawi: اورڠ ملايو بڠكولو) are a Malay ethnic group native to Bengkulu, a province on the southwest coast of Sumatra, Indonesia. While part of the larger Malay cultural and linguistic sphere, they have developed distinct historical, linguistic and cultural traits shaped by their unique geographic and historical context. They are the fourth-largest ethnic group in Bengkulu, following the Rejang, Javanese, and Minangkabau.

Their origins trace back to indigenous Rejang and Sungai Serut settlers, along with influences from Minangkabau, Javanese, Acehnese, and Palembang migrations. These interactions over centuries have contributed to the formation of a unique Bengkulu Malays identity, reflected in their language, customs, and traditions.

Culturally, the Bengkulu Malays blend indigenous and external influences, which are evident in their philosophy, attire, architecture, and cuisine. One of their most well-known traditions is the Tabot ceremony, a ritual commemorating the martyrdom of Husayn ibn Ali, which has become a major cultural event in Bengkulu.

Their language, Bengkulu Malay, is widely spoken in coastal and urban areas of the province of Bengkulu and serves as a local lingua franca. It has been shaped by influences from Minangkabau, Rejang, Javanese, Arabic, and Dutch. Despite modernization, the Bengkulu Malays continue to preserve their cultural heritage while adapting to contemporary influences.

== History ==
A map showing the location of the province of Bengkulu on the southwestern coast of Sumatra, Indonesia, where the Bengkulu Malays primarily reside, particularly in coastal and lowland areas.

The origins of the Bengkulu Malays are subject to various historical perspectives, with some theories linking them to the Rejang people, also known as Tun Hêjang in the local language, or to the inhabitants of the Sungai Serut Kingdom. These groups are believed to have established early settlements in Bengkulu, forming the foundation of the local Malay identity.

Over time, they assimilated with Minangkabau migrants, particularly during the early period of the Sungai Lemau Kingdom, which had connections to the Pagaruyung Kingdom. This interaction contributed to the cultural and linguistic development of the Bengkulu Malays.

By the early 19th century, European records documented the presence of the Bengkulu Malays along the coastal areas. Colonel Nahuijs (1823), described their settlements near the shoreline in what became known as Kampung Melayu (lit. 'Malay Village'). These communities grew as migrants from surrounding areas joined them, forming a distinct social and economic group.

As their population expanded, many migrated from rural settlements, including the Tiga Belas region and the highlands of West Sumatra. Van der Vinne (1843), identified them as the largest ethnic group in Bengkulu, noting that while many initially arrived in poor conditions, they gradually improved their economic status through artisanal work and trade. Over time, their participation in commerce contributed significantly to Bengkulu’s economic development.

The diverse origins of the Bengkulu Malays are also reflected in Tambo Bangkahoeloe (1933), as cited by Badrul Munir Hamidy (1991 or 1992). This historical record suggests that the Bengkulu Malays emerged from intermarriage between Javanese, Acehnese, Bugis, Lampung, Bantenese, Palembang, and Lembak peoples with the inhabitants of the Sungai Lemau Kingdom. These interethnic unions further enriched Bengkulu Malays culture, reinforcing its unique identity within the Malay world.

This cultural integration occurred during the reign of Datuk Bagindo Maharaja Sakti and Puteri Gading Cempaka, key figures in Bengkulu’s early history. The merging of these diverse groups played a role in shaping the Bengkulu Malays identity, which continued to evolve through subsequent generations.

== Culture and identity ==
=== Philosophy ===
The Bengkulu Malays have a distinct philosophy of life shaped by their natural surroundings, customs and social values. These principles are reflected in proverbs and customary laws, collectively known as Bengkulu Malay customary law (Hukum Adat Melayu Bengkulu). The philosophy emphasizes harmony, mutual assistance, humility, thriftiness, honesty, responsibility and tolerance as core values in daily life and governance.

One of the fundamental aspects of this philosophy is the importance of politeness and respectful communication, as expressed in traditional proverbs. For example, "endak alus baso de'ek basi" encourages speaking gently and politely, while "endak tinggi naikkan budi" promotes noble character and humility. These values guide social interactions, particularly in multiethnic communities such as Bengkulu City, where maintaining peaceful coexistence is essential.

=== Language ===
The Bengkulu Malay people primarily speak Bengkulu Malay, a regional variant of the Malayic languages that has developed through assimilation with various cultures. It serves as the dominant language in Bengkulu City and is widely used as a lingua franca across the province, facilitating communication between different ethnic groups.

Bengkulu Malay has been influenced by several local and foreign languages, including Rejang, Serawai, Pekal, Mukomuko, Minangkabau, Javanese, Arabic, English, and Dutch. Many loanwords from these languages have been incorporated into its vocabulary. For example, words such as kilap 'lightning', maap 'sorry', surgo 'heaven', and nerako 'hell' come from Arabic, while terms like kabat 'cupboard', jel 'jail', and pakit 'pocket' come from English. Meanwhile, Dutch influences can be seen in words like ban 'tire' and bangku 'bench'.

As the most widely spoken language in the province of Bengkulu, Bengkulu Malay holds an important cultural and social role. While native to the Bengkulu Malays, it is also used by other ethnic groups, including Lembak, Batak, and Chinese communities. In rural areas, where indigenous languages such as Rejang and Mukomuko are still spoken, Bengkulu Malay remains a common means of interethnic communication.

Despite linguistic diversity in the province, Bengkulu Malay continues to function as a symbol of identity for the Bengkulu Malays, reflecting their history, traditions, and cultural adaptability.

=== Tabot ceremony ===
The Tabot ceremony (upacara Tabot), also known as Tabut or Tabuik in other regions such as West Sumatra, is a traditional ritual practiced by the Bengkulu Malays. It commemorates the martyrdom of Husayn ibn Ali, the grandson of the Islamic prophet Muhammad, who was killed in the Battle of Karbala. Although originally a Shi'a Islamic ritual, the ceremony has been deeply integrated into the cultural traditions of the Bengkulu Malay community, particularly among the Sipai (Indian) descendants and the broader Bengkulu population. Over time, it has evolved into a local tradition that blends religious, cultural, and tourism aspects.

The Tabot ceremony is held annually from 1st to 10th Muharram in the Islamic calendar. The ritual involves symbolic reenactments of Husayn's death and burial, including the gathering of his body parts and their ceremonial burial. The procession consists of several stages, including mengambil tanah 'taking soil', duduk penja 'hand sitting ceremony', menjara 'procession', meradai 'collecting donations', arak penja 'parading the hand', arak serban 'parading the turban', gam 'mourning period', arak gedang 'grand procession', and tabot terbuang 'tabot disposal ceremony'.

The ceremony has two main aspects:

- Ritual aspect: This is exclusively performed by the descendants of the Tabot families, led by their elders. It follows strict customary rules and religious norms.
- Non-ritual aspect: Open to the general public, this includes cultural performances, music, and public celebrations.

In modern times, Tabot has been recognized as a major cultural event in Bengkulu, with the Indonesian government designating it as part of the national tourism calendar. The Tabot Festival now serves as a tourist attraction, drawing visitors from across Indonesia and abroad. While maintaining its historical significance, the event also features traditional arts, music, dance, and local crafts.

=== Architecture ===
Rumah Bubungan Lima is the traditional house of the Bengkulu Malay people, recognized for its distinctive architectural design and deep philosophical significance. Originating during the Inderapura Kingdom in the 17th century, this stilt house was specifically designed to withstand earthquakes, as Bengkulu is situated in a seismically active region. The name Bubungan Lima refers to its five-ridged roof, shaped like a pyramid.

Structurally, Rumah Bubungan Lima is supported by 15 wooden pillars, each 1.8 meters high, placed on flat stones to prevent decay and absorb seismic shocks. Its roof, traditionally made of ijuk 'palm fiber', is now often replaced with tiles or corrugated metal sheets. A distinguishing feature of the house is its odd-numbered staircase steps, typically 7, 9, or 11, reflecting the Bengkulu Malay people's spiritual and cultural beliefs.

This traditional house was primarily reserved for penghulu 'Village head' or adat leaders and consists of several designated rooms. The berendo 'front veranda' serves as a reception area for guests, while the hall is used for close family gatherings. Private spaces include the bilik gedang 'master bedroom' and bilik gadis 'room for unmarried daughters'. The ruang tengah 'central space' functions as a family living area and a sleeping space for unmarried sons, while the ruang makan 'dining room' and dapur 'kitchen' cater to household needs. Additionally, the garang 'washing area' and kolong 'under-house storage' are used for washing, water storage and keeping livestock or farming tools.

Beyond its architectural function, Rumah Bubungan Lima holds profound philosophical and ritualistic significance. The menaikan bubungan ritual, a protective ceremony performed during house construction, involves hanging agricultural offerings such as black sugarcane, golden bananas and sacred cloths on the roof ridge as a safeguard against misfortune. However, these traditional houses have become increasingly rare, with only a few preserved in areas such as Fatmawati, Tanjung Agung, and Simpang Empat Panorama.

=== Cuisine ===
The Bengkulu Malays, many of whom are involved in the fishing industry, have a cuisine that reflects their coastal environment. While their culinary traditions share similarities with other ethnic groups in Bengkulu, they are distinguished by a strong use of spices and minimal reliance on coconut milk.

One of their most distinctive dishes is bagar hiu, a shark-based dish that resembles rendang but is prepared without coconut milk. Instead, it uses toasted grated coconut and a blend of ground spices. Due to the strong natural odor of shark meat, it undergoes a special preparation process, including cleansing with lime juice and marinating with various seasonings. The availability of bagar hiu depends on the local shark catch, making it an occasional delicacy. Another notable seafood dish is ikan pais, a spicy fish dish wrapped in taro leaves and steamed.

Another notable seafood dish is ikan pais, a spicy fish dish wrapped in taro leaves and steamed, which enhances its aroma and flavor. Other popular fish-based dishes include acar ikan 'pickled fish', ikan santan bumbu kuning 'fish cooked in yellow coconut sauce', and santan putih 'white coconut-based fish dish', each showcasing the region’s diverse culinary traditions.

Vegetables play a significant role in Bengkulu Malay cuisine, with most ingredients sourced from traditional markets. Popular vegetable dishes include gulai keladi 'yam stem curry', gulai pucuk kates 'papaya leaf curry', and gulai pucuk ubi 'cassava leaf curry'. Spicy vegetable-based condiments, such as sambal unji and sambal kabau, are also commonly served.

Among traditional snacks, kue tat is widely enjoyed across Bengkulu. The Bengkulu Malay version is typically square-shaped, whereas the Serawai people version is round or leaf-shaped. Another unique delicacy is kue som, a sponge cake filled with tamarind jam, which is exclusive to the Bengkulu Malay cuisine tradition.

=== Traditional attire ===
The traditional attire of Bengkulu, known as Bengkulu Malay attire, reflects the region’s cultural heritage and Malay influences. This clothing differs for men and women, incorporating distinctive elements that symbolize tradition, social status and craftsmanship.

Men's traditional clothing consists of a teluk belango jacket, long trousers, a sarong, a detar 'headpiece', and a keris 'ceremonial dagger'. The teluk belango jacket is typically made from high-quality fabric such as velvet or wool and is usually dark-colored, often black or deep blue. The trousers are made from the same material to maintain a cohesive appearance. A sarong, often woven with gold or silver thread, is worn around the waist as a decorative and symbolic element. The detar, a folded fabric headdress, signifies dignity, while the keris, traditionally placed at the waist, represents bravery and honor.

The traditional attire for women consists of a baju kurung, a long-sleeved velvet blouse adorned with gold embroidery in circular motifs resembling coins. This embroidery is a symbol of prosperity and status. The baju kurung is commonly available in deep red, royal blue, purple, or black, reflecting elegance and cultural identity. It is paired with a sarong songket, a silk skirt featuring intricate gold or silver threadwork that enhances the attire’s decorative elements.

=== Textile ===
Kain besurek 'Bengkulu batik' is a traditional textile of the Bengkulu Malays, known for its distinctive patterns that incorporate Arabic calligraphy and local floral motifs. The exact origins of this fabric remain uncertain, but oral traditions suggest that its use has long been embedded in Bengkulu's cultural practices, particularly in ceremonial and religious events. Some historical accounts associate the introduction of kain besurek with the arrival of Prince Sentot Alibasya and his followers in Bengkulu, as many of its early artisans and users were believed to be his descendants.

Initially, kain besurek was primarily worn during traditional ceremonies, such as weddings, where it was used by groomsmen (as head coverings), brides (for bathing rituals and teeth-filing ceremonies), and as decorations for the bridal chamber. It was also used for funerary purposes, such as covering the deceased or during baby’s first haircut ceremonies.

The fabric is considered a regional adaptation of batik, passed down through generations. While it reflects Bengkulu Malay craftsmanship, its motifs exhibit strong Islamic influences, particularly through the presence of Arabic calligraphy. Over time, these motifs have evolved to include local elements, such as the Rafflesia flower and other indigenous flora.

There are seven primary motifs of kain besurek, each carrying symbolic meanings:

- Arabic calligraphy – features calligraphic inscriptions, reflecting Islamic influence.
- Moon and Arabic calligraphy – represents divine creation and celestial beauty.
- Arabic calligraphy and jasmine flowers – combines Islamic elements with floral motifs, as jasmine has cultural significance in Bengkulu.
- Arabic calligraphy and great argus pheasant (burung kuau) – depicts both Islamic artistry and local fauna.
- Tree of life with great argus and Arabic calligraphy – symbolizes the interconnectedness of nature and spirituality.
- Arabic calligraphy with clove and magnolia flowers – highlights important plants found in Bengkulu.

== See also ==
- Malay Indonesians
- Minangkabau people
- Rejang people
