= VKK =

VKK may refer to:

- Valta kuuluu kansalle, a political party in Finland
- vkk, the ISO 639-3 code for Kaur language

== See also ==
- Vkk menon, an Indian academic, politician, and statesman
