= Urk (disambiguation) =

Urk is a town in Flevoland province, the Netherlands.

Urk can also refer to:

- Urak Lawoi' language (ISO 639:urk), Malayic language spoken in Thailand
- Urk (crater), a crater on Mars
