= GOQ =

GOQ may refer to:

- Gazette officielle du Québec, the official gazette of the Government of Quebec, Canada
- Genuine occupational qualification
- Golmud Airport, in Qinghai, China
- Gorap language
- Grand Officer of the National Order of Quebec
