= Sawang =

Sawang may refer to:

- Sawang, Bhutan
- Sawang Boriboon, humanitarian rescue Thai based NGO operating within Pattaya
- Sawang Barangay of Romblon, Romblon
