= Seberuang language =

Austronesian language spoken in Indonesia

Seberuang
- Native to: Indonesia
- Region: West Kalimantan
- Native speakers: 37,000 (2007)
- Language family: Austronesian: Malayo-Polynesian; Malayic; Ibanic; Seberuang

Language codes
- ISO 639-3: sbx
- Glottolog: sebe1242

Seberuang is an Ibanic language spoken in the province of West Kalimantan, Indonesia. It is spoken by the Seberuang Dayak people who mainly live in Sintang Regency (especially in the districts of Sepauk, Tempunak, and parts of Sintang) and parts of Sekadau Regency (only in Belitang district). In addition, the speakers also live along the upper Seberuang River and also on the southern provincial road that connects Semitau with Putussibau, the capital of Kapuas Hulu Regency.
