= Proto-Malayic language =

Reconstructed ancestor of the Malayic languages

Proto-Malayic
- Reconstruction of: Malayic languages
- Region: See #Urheimat
- Reconstructed ancestors: Proto-Austronesian: Proto-Malayo-Polynesian

Proto-Malayic is a reconstructed proto-language of the Malayic languages, which are nowadays widespread throughout Indonesia, Malaysia, and Brunei in Maritime Southeast Asia but excluding the Philippines, home to the Philippine languages. Like most other proto-languages, Proto-Malayic was not attested in any prior written work. The most extensive study on the proto-language, Proto-Malayic: The Reconstruction of its Phonology and Parts of its Lexicon and Morphology, was done by K. Alexander Adelaar in 1992.

== Urheimat ==
According to H. Kern's work in 1917, Taalkundige gegevens ter bepaling van het stamland der Maleisch-Polynesische volkeren, the Urheimat (homeland) of the Proto-Malayic speakers was proposed to be at the Malay Peninsula, based on the Malay word selatan "south", being derived from selat "strait". Kerinci sound-changes and phonotactics by D. J. Prentice in 1978, believed that the core of the Malay language was on the both sides of the Strait of Malacca, although the Malayic languages spoken by Dayaks were not included.

However, Adelaar rejected Kern's proposal, and instead placing the Urheimat in Borneo, as the languages there have undergone little Sanskrit or Arabic influence.

== Phonology ==
Proto-Malayic had a total of 19 consonants and 4 vowels. Palatals (except *y) and voiced plosives cannot end a word, while only homorganic nasal–stop or *ŋs sequences are allowed in Proto-Malayic. Adelaar listed *t as a dental consonant, not alveolar. *ʔ, which only occurred word-finally, is preserved in Iban, although it is often not represented orthographically (Iban pakuʔ, Betawi paku ← *pakuʔ "nail").

Proto-Malayic Consonants
| | | Labial | Alveolar | Palatal | Velar | Glottal |
|---|---|---|---|---|---|---|
| Plosive | Voiceless | *p | *t | *c | *k | *ʔ |
| Plosive | Voiced | *b | *d | *j | *ɡ | |
| Nasal | | *m | *n | *ñ | *ŋ | |
| Fricative | | | *s | | | *h |
| Liquid | | | *l | | *r | |
| Approximant | | *w | | *y | | |

Proto-Malayic Vowels
| Height | Front | Central | Back |
|---|---|---|---|
| Close | *i | | *u |
| Mid | | *ə | |
| Open | | *a | |

According to Adelaar, there were only 2 diphthongs: *-ay, and *-aw. However, Anderbeck in 2012 posited an older diphthong *-uy, which is only present in Duano (though this may be due to the non-Malayic substratum), and was merged with -i elsewhere.

=== Word structure ===
Proto-Malayic lexemes are mostly disyllabic, though some have one, three, or four syllables. Lexemes have the following syllable structure:

* [C V (N)] [C V (N)] [C V (N)] C V C

Note: C = consonant, V = vowel, N = nasal

== Phonological changes ==
=== Towards proto-Malayic ===
The following are the phonological changes from Proto-Malayo-Polynesian to Proto-Malayic.

- *-əy, *-iw, *-uy > *-i; *-əw > *-u. Note that *-uy is still preserved in Duano (məloŋoy < *laŋuy "to swim").
- *z > *j (pronounced the same, an orthographic change), *-D-, *-j- > *-d-.
- Final-obstruent devoicing of *-b, *-d, and *-g to *-p, *-t, *-k, except in the case of *-D > *-r.
- *-ə- before *-h > *-a-, e.g. *tanəq > *tanəh > *tanah "land".
- *w- > *∅-.
- *q > *h, *h > *∅.
- *R > *r.
- C¹C² (with the first consonant is non-nasal) became C² in reduplications (affixes escaped this sound change).
- C¹C² (with the first consonant is heterorganic nasal) was changed to homorganic, e.g. *DəmDəm to *dəndəm.
- *ə- caused insertion of homorganic nasals before stops (*həpat > *əmpat "four"). The nasal insertion can also occur in other vowels, for example *utuŋ > *untuŋ and *tukəd > *tuŋkət, but this is sporadic.

=== Post proto-Malayic ===
- *-ə- in final closed syllables was preserved in Proto-Malayic (e.g. *daləm "inside"), but only retained in Betawi (including the Indonesian slang), Bangka Malay and Palembang Malay (specifically the Palembang Lama variety). It was merged with *-a- elsewhere (> *dalam).
- Remaining instances of *-ə- were merged with -a- in Banjarese and Minangkabau, but retained elsewhere.
- *-aba- is only retained in Iban, and changed to *-awa- elsewhere (*laban > *lawan).
- Final *a is still preserved in most of Borneo (excluding the western parts), but in Sumatra or the Malay peninsula, it most often mutates into another vowel, including /ə/, /o/, /e/, or even as high as /ɨ/ and /u/. The outcomes vary by dialect. Uri Tadmor claimed that this change was caused by Javanese influence. A notable exception to this rule is Haji in South Sumatra, which preserved original *a.
