= Musi language =

Malayic variety spoken in southern Sumatera

Musi
- Musi Malay
- Basé Musi
- Native to: Indonesia
- Region: South Sumatra
- Ethnicity: Musi
- Native speakers: (~600,000 cited 2000 census)
- Language family: Austronesian: Malayo-Polynesian; (disputed); Malayic; Musi; Upper Musi; Musi
- Dialects: Sekayu; Kelingi; Penukal

Language codes
- ISO 639-3: mui
- Glottolog: nucl1812
- The distribution of Musi lects across southern Sumatra

Musi (Basé Musi) is a Malayic variety spoken primarily in parts of South Sumatra, Indonesia. While the name Musi in the broad sense can also refer to the wider Musi dialect network comprising both Upper Musi and Palembang–Lowland clusters, it is locally used as an endonym specific to the variety spoken in the upstream parts of Musi River.

== Classification ==
Based on lexicostatistical analyses, mappings of sound changes, and mutual intelligibility tests, McDowell & Anderbeck (2020) classify Malayic varieties in southern Sumatra into two dialect groups, namely 1) South Barisan Malay (also called Central Malay or Middle Malay) and 2) Musi. The Musi grouping can be further divided into two clusters: 1) Upper Musi, containing Musi Proper (i.e. the lect referred to as "Musi" in local usage), Rawas, Pegagan, and Col, and 2) Palembang–Lowland, containing Palembang and Lowland subcluster (Belide, Lematang Ilir, and Penesak varieties).

All Upper Musi lects lost Proto-Malayic *h word-medially, including between like vowels, e.g. *dahan > dan 'branch'. As with other Southern Sumatran Malayic lects, *r is sometimes reflected as [r] and [ʔ], contrasting with a velar/uvular rhotic. More uniquely, Upper Musi lects evince 1) the loss of initial *r, e.g. *rumah 'house' > umah and *rusa 'deer' > use; 2) the shift of final *-ri > -ray, e.g. *jari 'finger' > jaray and *duri 'thorn' > duray, and 3) the merger of final *-ar, *-ur, and *-ir > -[o(ɰ)], e.g. *akar 'root' > ako, *bibir 'lip' > bibo, and *kapur 'lime' > kapo. The last merger did not happen in Rawas, as it only reflects the *-ar > -o shift. In addition, while most Upper Musi lects shifted final *a > [e], Rawas shifted the vowel to [o].

Musi Proper is spoken throughout parts of Musi Banyuasin and Musi Rawas regencies in South Sumatra. Internally, it can be divided into three subdialects, namely 1) Sekayu, 2) Kelingi, and 3) Penukal, each roughly corresponding to the names of the geographical area where they are spoken. Sekayu is spoken in and around the town of Sekayu, Musi Banyuasin, and is the central variety. Kelingi is spoken in parts of Musi Rawas Regency and neighbors the Sindang Kelingi subdialect of Col to the west. Meanwhile, Penukal speech area covers most of Penukal Abab Lematang Ilir Regency, bordering to its south the Lowland lects of Lematang Ilir and Belide, as well as the Highland (Central Malay) lect of Benakat.
