= Jakun language =

Malayic language spoken in Malaysia

Jakun
- Orang Hulu
- Native to: Malaysia
- Region: Johor, Pahang
- Ethnicity: 25,000 (2008)
- Language family: Austronesian: Malayo-Polynesian; Malayic; Jakun
- Dialects: Eastern Johor; Western Johor; Pahang?
- Writing system: Unwritten

Language codes
- ISO 639-3: jak
- Glottolog: jaku1244
- ELP: Jakun

Jakun is a Malayic language from the Austronesian language family spoken in Malaysia. Specifically it is spoken on the east coast and inland of Peninsular Malaysia, around the Pairang River, from Pekan in Pahang to Sri Gading, east to Benut, northwest to middle Muar River area around the districts of Segamat, Muar and Tangkak in Johor.

The language is native to the Jakun tribe belonging to the Proto-Malay branch of the indigenous natives of Malaysia, the Orang Asli.

== Dialects ==
The Jakun language can, at the very least, be divided into two dialects: the Western Johor dialect, and the Eastern Johor dialect.

They differ in mainly two aspects, pronunciation and vocabulary. In terms of pronunciation, the two dialects differ in that instances of final [-aC] in the Western Johor dialect correspond to [-ɔC] in the Eastern Johor dialect. For example, compare Western Johor [a.naʔ] 'child' and [ta.ŋan] 'hand' to Eastern Johor [a.nɔʔ] and [ta.ŋɔn]. Dialectal differences in the lexicon can be seen in the vocabulary section below.

A possible distinct Pahang dialect is reported to exist, although more research is required to verify this claim.

== Phonology ==
=== Vowels ===
The vowel inventory of Jakun consists of eight monophthongs, /a, i, e, ɛ, u, o, ɔ, ə/, and three diphthongs, /aw, aj, oj/.

Monophthongs of Jakun
	Front	Central	Back
Close	i		u
Close-mid	e	ə	o
Open-mid	ɛ	ə	ɔ
Open	a		

Diphthongs of Jakun
Coda	/j/	/w/
/a/	/aj/	/aw/
/o/	/oj/	

=== Consonants ===
The consonant inventory of Jakun consists of 19 consonants as shown in the table below.

Consonants
		Labial	Alveolar	Palatal	Velar	Glottal
Nasal		m	n	ɲ	ŋ	
Plosive/ Affricate	voiceless	p	t	tʃ	k	ʔ
Plosive/ Affricate	voiced	b	d	dʒ	ɡ	
Fricative			s			h
Rhotic			r			
Lateral			l			
Approximant		w		j		

=== Comparison with Proto-Malayic ===
Jakun displays both innovations and retentions when compared to Proto-Malayic, the reconstructed ancestor language of all Malayic languages. Among its innovations is the loss of Proto-Malayic final *-r in [i.ku] 'tail' and [ti.du] 'sleep' (compare Proto-Malayic *ikur and *tidur). Among its retentions, on the other hand, is its lack of lowering of penultimate *i- in certain words such as [ni.niʔ] 'grandmother' and [li.ba] 'wide' (compare its Standard Malay cognates, nenek and lebar). Jakun also shows a more conservative feature in its retention of Proto-Malayic *h in various positions such as in [ha.jam] 'chicken' and [kə.tu.haʔ] 'leader' (compare Standard Malay ayam and ketua).

== Vocabulary ==
Jakun has a lexical similarity of 92% with Standard Malay. That notwithstanding, Jakun has many unique words with no known cognates in Malay. Below is a non-exhaustive list of such words in the dialects of Jakun as spoken in Johor, in IPA transcription, along with their Standard Malay counterparts for comparison.

Vocabulary Comparison
	Western Johor Jakun	Eastern Johor Jakun	Standard Malay	English meaning
1	tunuʔ	baka	bakar	'to burn'
2	təkɛŋ	bənt͡ʃiʔ	benci	'to hate'
3	səɲɔp	ləsɔʔ	senyap	'silent'
4	halaw	iŋa	halau	'to get rid of'
5	usɛl	məsɛl	rindu	'to miss' (to long for)
