= Loncong language =

Austronesian language spoken in Indonesia

Loncong
- Orang Laut
- Sekak
- Native to: Indonesia
- Region: Riau, Riau Islands, Bangka and Belitung islands
- Ethnicity: Orang Laut and sub-groups
- Native speakers: (420 cited 2000)
- Language family: Austronesian: Malayo-Polynesian; Malayic; Loncong

Language codes
- ISO 639-3: lce
- Glottolog: lonc1237

The Loncong language, also known as the Sekak language or Orang Laut language, is a language spoken by the Orang Laut ('Sea people'), Sekak, Sawang, and other related sub-groups of the Orang Laut people. Its speakers are distributed along the eastern coast near the mouths of the Kampar River and Indragiri River and the surrounding islands, as well as along the coasts of Bangka Island and Belitung Island. This language belongs to the Austronesian language family.

Anderbeck considers there to be an Orang Laut genetic grouping of languages, which includes the Kedah, Riau, and Sekak subgroups. The Malayic language Duano is divergent, and does not form part of this group.

== Sources ==
- Anderbeck, Karl. 2012. The Malayic-speaking; Orang Laut Dialects and directions for research. Wacana, 14(2): 265-312.
- Blench, Roger. 2016. "The linguistic background to Southeast Asian sea nomadism". In Sea nomads of Southeast Asia: past and present. Bérénice Bellina, Roger M. Blench & Jean-Christophe Galipaud eds. Singapore: NUS Press.
- Moseley, Christopher and R. E. Asher, ed. Atlas of the Worlds Languages (New York: Routelage, 1994)
