= Yauyos Quechua =

Quechua dialect cluster

- Huangáscar–Topará
- Native to: Peru
- Region: Chincha Province, Yauyos province
- Native speakers: 600 (2017 census)
- Language family: Quechua: Yauyos Quechua

Language codes
- ISO 639-3: qux
- Glottolog: yauy1235 Yauyos
- ELP: Yauyos Quechua
- Yauyos Quechua and neighboring varieties
- Quechua of Yauyos is classified as Critically Endangered by the UNESCO Atlas of the World's Languages in Danger.

Yauyos Quechua is a moribund language cluster of Quechua, spoken in the Yauyos and Chincha districts of Peru. There are numerous dialects: in Yauyos, San Pedro de Huacarpana, Apurí, Madean-Viñac (Madeán), Azángaro-Huangáscar-Chocos (Huangáscar), Cacra-Hongos, Tomás-Alis (Alis), Huancaya-Vitis, Laraos, with similar diversity in Chincha.

The Tana-Lincha (Lincha) dialect included by Ethnologue 25, however, is part of Cajamarca-Lambayeque Quechua.

== Phonology ==
Yauyos Quechua omits several distinctions present in other Quechuan languages. The orthography used below is the one used in A Grammar of Yauyos Quechua.

=== Consonants ===
| | | Bilabial | Labio-dental | Alveolar | Post-alveolar | Retroflex | Palatal | Velar | Uvular | Glottal |
|---|---|---|---|---|---|---|---|---|---|---|
| Stop | voiceless | p ⟨p⟩ | | t ⟨t⟩ | | ʈ ⟨tr⟩ | c ⟨ch⟩ | k ⟨k⟩ | q ⟨q⟩ | |
| Stop | voiced | (b) ⟨b⟩ | | (d) ⟨d⟩ | | | | (g) ⟨g⟩ | | |
| Fricative | voiceless | | (f) ⟨f⟩ | s ⟨s⟩ | ʃ ⟨sh⟩ | | | | | h ⟨h⟩ |
| Fricative | voiced | | (v) ⟨v⟩ | | | | | | | |
| Nasal | | m ⟨m⟩ | | n ⟨n⟩ | | | ɲ ⟨ñ⟩ | | | |
| Approximant | | β ⟨w⟩ | | | | | j ⟨y⟩ | | | |
| Lateral | | | | l ⟨l⟩ | | | ʎ ⟨ll⟩ | | | |
| Flap | | | | ɾ ⟨r⟩ | | | | | | |
| Trill | | | | (r) ⟨rr⟩ | | | | | | |

Sounds in parentheses are only found in loanwords from Spanish.

== Bibliography ==
- Shimelman, Aviva (2017). A Grammar of Yauyos Quechua. Studies in Diversity Linguistics 9. Berlin: Language Science Press. doi:10.5281/zenodo.376355. ISBN 978-3-946234-21-0.
- Bertet, Denis (2013). Éléments de description du parler quechua d'Hongos (Yauyos, Lima, Pérou) : morphologie nominale et verbale [with texts and a lexicon] (MA thesis).

=== Online Dictionaries ===
- Yauyos–English (Aviva Shimelman)
- Yauyos–Castellano (Aviva Shimelman)
