= Sawang Boriboon =

Sawang Boriboon Wittaya School
- Founded: 1948
- Founder: 李賓菊 Dek Seri
- Type: Non-governmental organization, Non-profit organization
- Purpose: Humanitarian rescue, Education
- Location: Pattaya, Thailand
- Region served: Thailand

Sawang Boriboon Wittaya School (th:โรงเรียนสว่างบริบูรณ์วิทยา) is a non-profit humanitarian based organization based and operating in Pattaya, Thailand. Originating as a Thai-Chinese Buddhist community based organization to fulfil the needs of local community, including language education, feeding the needy with vegetarian food, it is well known in the country for its humanitarian rescue teams. The language arm is called Sawang Boriboon Wittaya and began operations in 2001.

Its affiliate Sawang operates throughout the nation.
