= Col language =

Language in Indonesia

Col
- Base Lembak
- Sindang
- Native to: Indonesia
- Region: Sumatra
- Native speakers: (150,000 cited 2000 census)
- Language family: Austronesian: Malayo-Polynesian; (disputed); Malayic; Col

Language codes
- ISO 639-3: liw
- Glottolog: coll1240
- Linguasphere: 33-AFA-dt

Col (pronounced: [tʃɔl]), or Lembak (also known as Bahase Linggau), is a Malayic language from Sumatra, Indonesia. It is spoken by around 145,000 speakers (2000) with most speakers found in Lubuklinggau Municipality, South Sumatra, and the areas surrounding it, all the way to Musi Rawas in South Sumatra. The speakers of this language belong to the Lembak ethnic group, a small ethnic group closely related to ethnic Malays, especially those of Bengkulu Malays and Palembang Malays. Among South Sumatran Malayic varieties, Col is most closely related to Musi. The language has its own ISO code, liw.
