= Menterap language =

Malayic language of Borneo, Indonesia

Menterap
- Native to: Indonesia
- Region: Sekadau River, Borneo
- Language family: Austronesian: Malayo-Polynesian; Malayo-Sumbawan ?; Malayic; Menterap

Language codes
- ISO 639-3: None (mis)
- Glottolog: ment1251

Menterap is a Malayic language of Borneo.
