= Malayic languages =

Subgroup of the Austronesian language family

Malayic
- Geographic distribution: Maritime Southeast Asia
- Linguistic classification: Austronesian: Malayo-Polynesian; disputed: Malayo-Sumbawan or Greater North Borneo; Malayo-Chamic; Malayic
- Proto-language: Proto-Malayic
- Subdivisions: (inconclusive)

Language codes
- Glottolog: mala1538
- Historical distribution of the Malayic languages in Maritime Southeast Asia (including Malay-based creoles): The Ibanic, Western Malayic Dayak (Kanayatn/Kendayan-Salako) subgroups, and southern Malayic Dayak varieties. Other Malayic varieties; genetic relationships between them are still unclear (most often left unclassified).

The Malayic languages are a branch of the Malayo-Polynesian subgroup of the Austronesian language family. The most prominent member is Malay, a pluricentric language given national status in Brunei and Singapore while also providing the basis for national standards Malaysian in Malaysia and Indonesian in Indonesia. The Malayic branch also includes local languages spoken by ethnic Malays (e.g. Jambi Malay, Kedah Malay), further several languages spoken by various other ethnic groups of Sumatra, Indonesia (e.g. Minangkabau) and Borneo (e.g. Banjarese, Iban) even as far as Urak Lawoi in the southwestern coast of Thailand.

In addition, the Malayic languages have been also used as lingue franche throughout Eastern Indonesia, such as Sulawesi, Nusa Tenggara Islands, Maluku Islands, and Papua. The most probable candidate for the urheimat of the Malayic languages is western Borneo prior to spread in Sumatra.

== History ==
The term "Malayic" was first coined by Dyen (1965) in his lexicostatistical classification of the Austronesian languages. Dyen's "Malayic hesion" had a wider scope than the Malayic subgroup in its currently accepted form, and also included Acehnese, Lampung and Madurese. Nothofer (1988) narrowed down the range of Malayic, but included the non-Malayic languages Rejang and Embaloh:

- Rejang
- Embaloh
- Salako
- Iban-Malayan
  - Ibanic
  - Malayan

The present scope of the Malayic subgroup, which is now universally accepted by experts in the field, was first proposed by K.A. Adelaar (1992, 1993), based on phonological, morphological and lexical evidence.

== Languages ==
Malayic languages are spoken on Borneo, Sumatra, the Malay Peninsula, Java and on several islands located in the South China Sea and the Strait of Malacca. This list is limited to Malayic languages traditionally spoken by their respective ethnic groups, for non-traditional languages, see Malay trade and creole languages.

=== Borneo ===
Language	Country or administrative division
Banjar (incl. Bukit Malay)	Central Kalimantan, South Kalimantan, East Kalimantan (as far north as the Berau Regency)
Brunei Malay (incl. Kedayan)	Brunei, Labuan, Sabah, eastern Sarawak
Berau Malay	East Kalimantan (Berau Regency)
Ibanic branch (Iban, Remun, Mualang, Seberuang)	Sarawak, northern West Kalimantan
Kapuas Hulu Malay	West Kalimantan
Kendayan	Western West Kalimantan
Keninjal	West Kalimantan
Ketapang Malay	West Kalimantan
Kotawaringin Malay	Central Kalimantan
Kutai (Kota Bangun and Tenggarong varieties)	East Kalimantan (Kutai)
Malayic Dayak	Central Kalimantan, West Kalimantan
Melawi Malay	West Kalimantan
Pontianak Malay	West Kalimantan
Sanggau Malay	West Kalimantan
Sambas Malay	West Kalimantan
Sarawak Malay	Sarawak
Sintang Malay	West Kalimantan

=== Sumatra ===
- Bilah–Panai Malay, Central Malay, Col, Haji, Jambi Malay, Kaur, Kerinci, Kubu, Langkat Malay, Lubu, Minangkabau (incl. Jamee, Kampar, Kuantan, Mukomuko, and Pesisir), Musi, Palembang, Pekal, Riau Malay, Serdang Malay, Tamiang Malay

=== Malay Peninsula ===
Language	Country or administrative division
Jakun	Pahang, Johor
Johor-Riau-Malacca (Malaccan) Malay	along the western coasts of the Malay Peninsula, starting from southern Perak (Muallim District) to Selangor, Kuala Lumpur, Putrajaya, Negeri Sembilan (Port Dickson District), Malacca, Johor and Singapore.
Kedah Malay	Kedah, Penang, Perlis, northwestern Perak, Satun (Thailand), Tanintharyi (Myanmar)
Kelantan-Patani Malay	Kelantan, Pattani, Yala, Narathiwat, Songkhla (Thepha District and Saba Yoi District), Terengganu (Besut and Setiu)
Negeri Sembilan Malay	Negeri Sembilan, Malacca (Naning), some areas in Pahang and Johor
Pahang Malay	Pahang, Terengganu (around areas of Pasir Raja), Negeri Sembilan (around Jelebu District)
Penang Malay	Penang
Perak Malay	Perak
Reman Malay (offshoot of Kelantan-Patani language)	Kedah (mainly in Baling District but also in Sik District and Yan District), Perak (Hulu Perak District)
Orang Kanaq	Johor
Orang Seletar	Johor
Temuan	Selangor, Kuala Lumpur, Negeri Sembilan, Malacca, Pahang
Terengganu Malay	Terengganu, Pahang (mainly Kuantan District and Rompin District), Johor (Mersing District and Tanjung Sedili)
Tioman Malay	Pahang (Tioman Island), Johor (Aur Island and Pemanggil Island)
Urak Lawoi'	Thailand (Phuket, Krabi, Satun)

=== Java ===
- Betawi (incl. Cocos Malay)

=== South China Sea ===
- Bangka Malay, Duano, Loncong, Orang Seletar

== Subgrouping ==
=== Internal classification ===
While there is general consensus about which languages can be classified as Malayic, the internal subgrouping of the Malayic languages have remained inconclusive.

==== Adelaar (1993) ====
Adelaar (1993) classifies the Malayic languages as follows.

- Malayic
  - Iban
    - Malay
    - Minangkabau
    - Middle Malay
    - Banjarese
    - Betawi
    - Others

==== Ross (2004) ====
Based on grammatical evidence, Ross (2004) divides the Malayic languages into two primary branches:

- Malayic
  - Western Malayic Dayak (Kendayan, Salako)
  - Nuclear Malayic (all other lects)

This classification was mirrored in the Glottolog (Version 3.4).

==== Anderbeck (2012) ====
Following Tadmor (2002), Anderbeck (2012) makes a distinction between Malay and Malayic in his discussion about the dialects of the Sea Tribes in Riau Archipelago. He tentatively classifies all Malayic languages as belonging to a "Malay" subgroup, except Ibanic, Kendayan/Selako, Keninjal, Malayic Dayak (or "Dayak Malayic") and the "fairly divergent varieties" of Urak Lawoi' and Duano. (Note: As with Adelaar, Anderbeck reckons the difficulty in assigning absolute subgrouping within Malayic subfamily, and suggests an alternative approach which is "to dissolve the Malay node and keep everything in the Malayic group".)

- Malayic
  - Ibanic
  - Kendayan/Selako
  - Keninjal
  - Malayic Dayak
  - Urak Lawoi'
  - Duano
  - Malay (including all other Malayic varieties)

Anderbeck's classification has been adopted in the 17th edition of the Ethnologue, with the sole exception of Duano, which is listed in the Ethnologue among the "Malay" languages. (Note: This classification is still in use in the current 22nd edition (2019).)

==== Smith (2017) ====
In his dissertation on the languages of Borneo, Smith (2017) provides evidence for a subgroup comprising Malayic isolects in western Borneo and southern Sumatra, which he labels "West Bornean Malayic".

- Malayic
  - West Bornean Malayic
    - Kendayan-Salako (= Ross' "Western Malayic Dayak")
    - Besemah (Note: Alongside other various South Sumatran isolects which exhibit the *-R > *-ʔ innovation in a specific set of lexemes.)
    - Ibanic
      - Iban
      - Seberuang
      - Mualang
      - Keninjal
  - Other Malayic (not a genetic subgroup)
    - Malay
    - Betawi
    - Ketapang Malay
    - Banjarese
    - Kutai
    - Brunei Malay

==== Glottolog ====
Glottolog 5.2 classifies the Malayic languages into several groups, namely:

- Malayic
  - Duano
  - Haji
  - Malayic Dayak
  - Old Malay
  - Western Malayic Dayak
    - Kendayan–Belangin
    - Menterap
  - Ibanic
    - Keninjal
    - Iban–Mualang–Seberuang
      - Mualang
      - Iban–Seberuang
        - Seberuang
        - Northern Iban
          - Iban
          - Remun
  - Nuclear Malayic
    - South Sumatra Malay
      - Kaur
      - South Barisan Malay
    - Standard Malay–Indonesian
      - Standard Indonesian
      - Standard Malay
    - Betawic
      - Betawi
      - Cocos Islands Malay
      - Peranakan Indonesian
    - Central Sumatran Malay
      - Kubu
      - Music
        - Col
        - Musi
    - East Borneo Malay
      - Kota Bangun Kutai Malay
      - Banjar–Berau–Brunei Malay
        - Banjar–Bukit Malay
          - Banjar
          - Bukit Malay
        - Berau–Brunei Malay
          - Berau Malay
          - Bruneic Malay
            - Sabah Malay
            - Brunei–Bacan Malay
              - Bacanese Malay
              - Brunei
    - Northern Sumatra Malay
      - Jambi Malay
      - Bangka–Belitung Malay
        - Bangka
        - Loncong
      - Kerinci–Minangkabau
        - Kerinci
        - Minangkabauic
          - Lubu
          - Minangkabau
          - Negeri Sembilan Malay
          - Pekal
    - Greater Riau–Johoric
      - Balinese Malay
      - Central Malay
      - Jakun
      - Orang Kanaq
      - Orang Selatar
      - Temuan
      - Tenggarong Kutai Malay
      - Northeastern Peninsular Malay
        - Kedah–Perak Malay
        - Kelantan–Pattani Malay
        - Urak Lawoiʼ
    - Vehicular Malay
      - Baba Malay
      - Makassar Malay
      - Malaccan Creole Malay
      - Sri Lanka Malay
      - Eastern Indonesia Trade Malay
        - Kupang Malay
        - Larantuka Malay
        - Papuan Malay
        - Ambonic Malay
          - Ambonese Malay
          - Banda Malay
        - Manadoic Malay
          - Gorap
          - Manado Malay
          - North Moluccan Malay

=== Position within Austronesian ===
The inclusion of the Malayic languages within the Malayo-Polynesian subgroup is undisputed, and there is general consensus that the Chamic languages are closely related to Malayic. The wider affiliations of the Malayic languages are however controversial. There are two major proposals: Adelaar (2005) places Malayic within the Malayo-Sumbawan subgroup, which comprises the following languages:

- Malayo-Sumbawan
  - Malayo-Chamic-BSS
    - Malayic languages
    - Chamic languages
    - Bali-Sasak-Sumbawa languages
  - Sundanese
  - Madurese

Blust (2010) and Smith (2017) assign Malayic to the Greater North Borneo subgroup:

- Greater North Borneo
  - North Borneo languages
  - Central Sarawak languages
  - Kayan–Murik languages
  - Land Dayak languages
  - Malayo–Chamic
    - Chamic languages
    - Malayic languages
  - Rejang language
  - Sundanese language

The Malayo-Sumbawan hypothesis is mainly based on phonological evidence with a few shared lexical innovations, while the Greater North Borneo hypothesis is based on a large corpus of lexical evidence.

== See also ==
- Languages of Indonesia
- Indonesian language, the Malayic language with the most speakers
