= Cañar Highland Quichua =

Variety of Kichwa

- Native to: Ecuador
- Region: Cañar Province
- Ethnicity: Kichwa people, Cañari
- Language family: Quechuan: Quechua II; Northern; Kichwa; Cañar Highland Quichua

Language codes
- ISO 639-3: qxr
- Glottolog: cana1262
- Linguasphere: 84-FAA-ce

Cañar Highland Quichua is a variety of the Kichwa language spoken in the Cañar Province of Ecuador. The language has received significant influence in its vocabulary from the long-extinct and poorly known Cañari language.
