= South Barisan Malay =

Austronesian spoken language in Indonesia

- Central Malay
- Native to: Indonesia
- Region: Bengkulu; South Sumatra; Lampung
- Native speakers: (1.6 million cited 2000)
- Language family: Austronesian: Malayo-Polynesian; Malayo-Chamic; Malayic; South Barisan Malay
- Dialects: Benakat; Bengkulu; Besemah; Enim; Lematang Ulu; Lintang; Ogan; Rambang; Semende; Serawai

Language codes
- ISO 639-3: pse
- Glottolog: high1292 (partial)
- The distribution of Barisan lects across southern Sumatra.

South Barisan Malay, also called Central Malay or Middle Malay, is a collection of closely related Malayic isolects spoken in the southwestern part of Sumatra. None of them has more than one million speakers.

== Name ==
Traditionally, Malayic lects in southern Sumatra are divided based on river shed and microethnic boundaries, regardless of actual similarities and differences between them. Linguists originally used the term Middle Malay (a calque of Dutch Midden-Maleisch) when referring to the closely related lects in the Pasemah-Serawai cultural region. Later, to avoid misidentification with a temporal stage of Malay language (i.e. the transition between Old Malay and Modern Malay), the term Central Malay began to be used. McDonnell (2016) uses the geographic term South Barisan Malay instead, referring to the southern region of the Barisan Mountains where these lects are spoken. Meanwhile, Glottolog uses the term Central Malay instead to refer Malayic varieties around the strait of Malacca and South China Sea (e.g. Deli Malay, Riau Malay, or Sarawak Malay), grouped under Greater Riau–Johoric branch.

== Varieties ==
McDowell & Anderbeck (2020) classified South Barisan lects into 2 major dialect clusters, namely 1) Oganic and 2) Highland.

- Oganic
  - Ogan
  - Rambang
  - Enim
- Highland
  - Bengkulu
  - Besemah
  - Lematang Ulu
  - Lintang
  - Semende
  - Benakat
  - Serawai
  - Kaur (ISO 639-3: vkk)
  - Pekal (ISO 639-3: pel)

This classification was partially adopted (with the exception of Pekal) by Glottolog in its latest version (4.8). All ISO 639-3 language codes for South Barisan Malay varieties were merged into [pse] in 2007 by the Summer Institute of Linguistics, with the exceptions of [vkk] for Kaur and [pel] for Pekal. The old codes ([bke], [eni], [lnt], [ogn], [sdd], [srj]) are no longer in active use, but still have the meaning assigned to them when they were established in the Standard.
