= Pekal language =

Malayic language in Indonesia

Pekal
- Native to: Indonesia
- Region: Mukomuko Regency, Bengkulu, Sumatra (Indonesia)
- Native speakers: (30,000 cited 2000 census)
- Language family: Austronesian: Malayo-Polynesian; (disputed); Malayic; Pekal

Language codes
- ISO 639-3: pel
- Glottolog: peka1242

Pekal is a Malayic language spoken by around 30,000 people on the island of Sumatra in Indonesia, more specifically in Mukomuko Regency in Bengkulu Province. It should not be confused with Mukomuko language which is much more closely related but distinct from Pekal. It also has a considerable influence from Rejang language, which is the most widely spoken language in the province.

== Comparison ==
Pekal	apo	lawik	liek	kucing	lalui	ulah	kehas	manis	lutuik
Minangkabau	apo	lauik	liaik/caliak	kuciang	pai	ula	kareh	manih	lutuik
Mukomuko	apo	laut	liek	kucieng	paing	ula	kaqeh	manih	lutut
Urak Lawoi’	nama	lawoiʼ	lihai’	mi’aw	pi	ulal	kras	maneh	lutoi’
Indonesian	apa	laut	lihat	kucing	pergi	ular	keras	manis	lutut
