= Gorap language =

Malay creole, spoken in Northern Halmahera Island

Gorap
- Native to: Indonesia
- Region: Northern and western regions of Halmahera Island (mainly)
- Ethnicity: Gorap people
- Native speakers: (1,000 cited 1992)
- Language family: Malay-based creole: Eastern Indonesia Malay; Manadoic Malay; Gorap

Official status
- Recognised minority language in: Indonesia

Language codes
- ISO 639-3: goq
- Glottolog: gora1261
- ELP: Gorap; Gorap
- Gorap language classified as Endangered by UNESCO in its Atlas of the World's Languages at Risk of Extinction.

Gorap is a Malay-based creole language predominantly spoken by Gorap (Bobaneigo) (Note: Bobaneigo is actually the name of a village where the Gorap language is spoken, this overlaps greatly with the ethnic name itself which is actually simply referred to as "Gorap".) ethnic group, indigenous to western and northern regions of the Indonesian island of Halmahera. It shares vocabulary with other Papuan languages and some of languages spoken in Sulawesi, such as Buginese and Cia-Cia. Roughly around 60 out of 200 attested words in this language were indicated sharing vocabulary with those languages.

While the Gorap language is also well documented, the collection mostly contains stimulus-based recordings; namely from Pear Film and Man and Tree Spacegame, but also folklore. The collection is expected to grow gradually in the coming years, covering various genres of speaking events. Many recordings were transcribed in Gorap language and translated into English language and standard Indonesian.

== Distribution ==
Gorap language is spoken natively on the Indonesian island of Halmahera, specifically in the Kao Teluk district which is administratively part of the North Halmahera Regency and also in the East Jailolo district in the West Halmahera Regency. This language is also spoken by its diasporic community, especially those who lives on the island of Morotai (especially South Morotai) and also on the island of Sulawesi (especially Southeast Sulawesi).

This language is spoken in 11 villages in the northern part of Halmahera island and southern part of Morotai island, which from population surveys is inhabited by the Gorap ethnic group as much as 87.68%, Makian 1.29%, Galela 1.37%, Ternate 0.60%, Tobelo 0.55%, Sangir 6.67%, Bugis 1.24%, Javanese 0.77%, and Maba as much as 1.03%. The Gorap speaking villages are Bobaneigo, Nusa Ambu, Sondo-Sondo, Nusa Jaya, Talaga Jaya, Ekor, Saramaake in Halmahera island; Daruba, Galo-Galo, Waringin, Pilowo in Morotai island.

== Classification ==
Gorap is classified as a creole language of Eastern Indonesia Malay. It is creolized because it is used as the lingua franca of the people in the area where other languages in the Austronesian and Papuan family are spoken, so most of its vocabulary is influenced by the surrounding languages. Malay and other Sulawesi languages indicated to be spoken in the Halmahera itself is thought to have spread through trader from the Sulawesi region who traded using the language. According to Glottolog, the Gorap language along with Manado Malay and North Moluccan Malay are grouped into its own sub-branch of East Indonesian Malay creole languages, the Manadoic branch.
