= Urak Lawoiʼ language =

Austronesian language spoken in Thailand

Urak Lawoiʼ
- อูรักลาโวยจ
- Native to: Thailand
- Region: Phuket, Krabi, Satun
- Ethnicity: Urak Lawoiʼ
- Native speakers: 5,000 (2012)
- Language family: Austronesian: Malayo-Polynesian; (disputed); Malayic; Urak Lawoiʼ
- Dialects: Phuket; Lanta (Sangka-u); Adang
- Writing system: Thai script (usually oral)

Official status
- Recognised minority language in: Thailand native to the provinces of Phuket, Krabi, Satun
- Regulated by: Research Institute for Languages and Cultures of Asia, Mahidol University

Language codes
- ISO 639-3: urk
- Glottolog: urak1238
- ELP: Urak Lawoi'
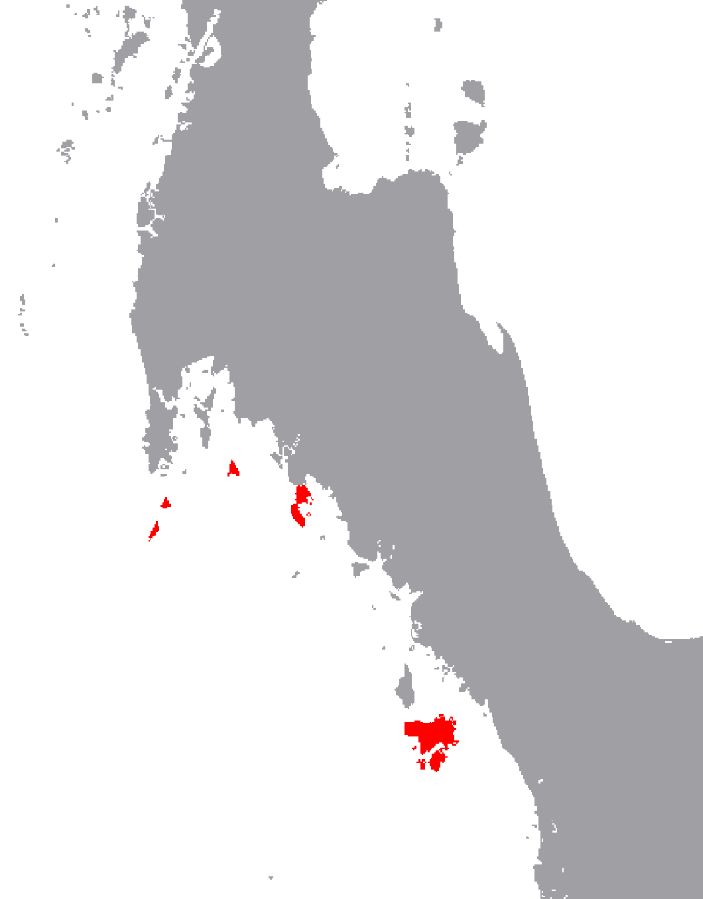

Urak Lawoiʼ or Urak Lawoc (Urak Lawoiʼ: อูรักลาโวยจ, [ˈurʌk ˈlawʊjʔ]) is a Malayic language from the Austronesian language family spoken in southern Thailand.

The Orang (Suku) Laut who live between Sumatra and the Malay Peninsula speak divergent Malayic lects, which bear some intriguing connections to various Sumatran Malay varieties.

== Phonology and orthography ==
=== Vowels ===
Vowel table
	Front	Central	Back
High	/i/		/u/
Mid	/e/	/ə/ [ə~ɨ~ɯ]	/o/
Low	/ɛ/	/a/	/ɔ/

- In closed syllables, some vowels change their quality:
  - /a/ becomes [ʌ] (/ˈrawak/ [ˈraˑwʌk] 'space').
  - /i/ becomes [ɪ] (/ˈbaliʔ/ [ˈbaˑlɪʔ] 'return').
  - /o/ becomes [ʊ] (/ˈproc/ [ˈprʊiʔ] 'stomach').
- Epenthetic /j/ and /w/ are added after high vowels /i/, /u/ respectively (/ˈsiˑjak/ 'light', /ˈbuˑwak/ 'to throw away').
- Vowels are somewhat allophonically lengthened in stressed open syllables.
- Vowels other than /ə/ are slightly nasalized after nasal consonants. If the following syllable has /w/, /j/ as the onset, this onset is also nasalized (/məˈnaŋɛh/ [məˈnãˑŋɛ̃h] 'to cry', /ˈɲawa/ [ˈɲãˑw̃ã] 'body, self').

Orthography (ordered according to Latin letters)
Thai (long & short)		Latin	IPA
◌า	◌ั	a	/a/
แ◌	แ◌	ä	/ɛ/
เ◌อ	เ◌ิ	e	/ə/ [ə~ɨ~ɯ]
เ◌	เ◌	ë	/e/
◌ี	◌ิ	i	/i/
โ◌	โ◌ or absent	o	/o/
◌อ	◌อ	ö	/ɔ/
◌ู	◌ุ	u	/u/

Notes: In the Thai script, the left column represents diacritics for open syllables, while the right one for closed syllables. For syllables with vowel ö, before consonants k, m, n, ng, p, and t, the vowel is not written. Similarly, the diacritic for a is not used before q. Any vowels with separate closed syllable diacritics have an inherent value of /-ʔ/ when not used with a succeeding consonant.

=== Consonants ===
Consonant table
		Labial	Alveolar	Alveolo-palatal	Velar	Glottal
Stop	Aspirated	/pʰ/ พ	/tʰ/ ท	/cʰ/ [t͡ɕʰ] ช	/kʰ/ ค	
Stop	Voiceless	/p/ ป	/t/ ต	/c/ [t͡ɕ] จ	/k/ ก	/ʔ/ อ
Stop	Voiced	/b/ บ	/d/ ด	/ɟ/ [d͡ʑ] ยฺ	/ɡ/ กฺ	
Fricative		/f/ ฟ	/s/ ซ			/h/ ฮ
Nasal		/m/ ม	/n/ น	/ɲ/ ญ	/ŋ/ ง	
Lateral			/l/ ล			
Semivowel		/w/ ว	/r/ ร	/j/ ย		

- [t͡ɕ] and [t͡ɕʰ] allophones are influenced by Thai, whereas [d͡ʑ] is influenced by Malay.
- Aspirated consonants and /f/ only appear in loanwords (mostly from Thai).
- Phonetically, /-c/ and /-s/ is pronounced [-jʔ], and [-jh] (after back vowels and /a/) or [-h] (after front vowels), respectively, syllable-finally.
- /l/ becomes [l] after /i/, /ə/, otherwise [ɭ] in syllable-final positions (/ˈlihəl/ [ˈliˑhəl] 'neck' vs. /ˈbumɔl/ [ˈbuˑmɔɭ] 'doctor').
- /ər/ is compensatorily lengthened to phonetically long [əə]. In stressed positions, the vowel cluster fluctuates between [ɽ], [ər], [rə].
- The coda stop /k/ after a front vowel becomes [kx] (/ˈkamek/ [ˈkaˑmekx] 'sheep').
- Syllable-initial stops /p/, /b/, with the same syllable containing a back vowel and coda /c/, are labialized to /pw/ and /bw/ respectively (/səˈboc/ [səˈbwʊjʔ] 'to utter').

Finals
IPA	/-k/ [-k̚]	/-ŋ/	/-t/ [-t̚]	/-n/	/-p/ [-p̚]	/-m/	/-j/	/-c/ [-jʔ]	/-s/ [-jh]	/-w/	/-h/	/-l/*
Thai	-ก	-ง	-ด	-น	-บ	-ม	-ย	-ยจ	-ยฮ	-ว	-ฮ	-ล*
Latin	-k	-ng	-t	-n	-p	-m	-y	-c	-s	-w	-h	-l*

- /-j/ and /-w/ can be treated as a part of diphthongs or triphthongs.
- /-l/ only exists in the Phuket dialect.

=== Stress and intonation ===
Urak Lawoiʼ does not have tones, except in Thai loans. Words are usually stressed in penultimate syllable, except if the expected stress is placed on the pre-syllable (e.g. open syllables containing /ə/, but not /ər/) the stress moves into the next syllable. Urak Lawoiʼ also has global intonation — for instance, interrogative sentences have rising intonation and negative sentences have lower-pitch intonation.
