= Haji language =

Language in Indonesia

Haji
- Native to: Indonesia
- Region: Sumatra
- Native speakers: (18,000 cited 2000 census)
- Language family: Austronesian: Malayo-Polynesian; (disputed); Malayic; Haji

Language codes
- ISO 639-3: hji
- Glottolog: haji1235

Haji (Aji) is a Malayic language spoken on the island of Sumatra in Indonesia. A third of the vocabulary is derived from Lampung.
