= Kaur language =

Language in Indonesia

Kaur
- Ka'ur
- Native to: Indonesia
- Region: Sumatra (Bengkulu)
- Native speakers: (40,000 cited 2000)
- Language family: Austronesian: Malayo-Polynesian; Malayic; Kaur

Language codes
- ISO 639-3: vkk
- Glottolog: kaur1269

Kaur (Ka'ur) is a Malayic language spoken in Bengkulu province on the southeastern coast of the island of Sumatra in Indonesia. It is difficult for speakers of neighboring Central Malay (Bengkulu) to understand. Many speakers are animists.
