= Duanoʼ language =

Malayic language spoken in Southeast Asia

Duanoʼ
- Region: Indonesia (Sumatra), Malaysia (Malay Peninsula)
- Ethnicity: Orang Kuala
- Native speakers: 16,000 (2006)
- Language family: Austronesian: Malayo-Polynesian; Malayic; Duanoʼ

Language codes
- ISO 639-3: dup
- Glottolog: duan1242
- ELP: Duano'

Duanoʼ is a Malayic language of Indonesia and Malaysia. In Malaysia the language is moribund, being spoken by only a tenth of the ethnic population.

While Duanoʼ is usually considered a Malayic language, it contains a significant amount of words derived from Proto-Malayo-Polynesian that do not follow Malayic sound changes, such as *qulu > kulu "head" and *qatay > ɣati "liver", which indicates that Duanoʼ was originally a non-Malayic language that underwent heavy Malayic influence.
