= Languages of Kalimantan =

There are 74 living languages in Kalimantan, Indonesia. They belong to Malayo-Polynesian subgroup of Austronesian family. Also, Tringgus-Sembaan Bidayuh language is spoken as an immigrant language from Sarawak.

According to Ethnologue, the languages belong to five families:

Family	Code on map
Greater Barito	G
Land Dayak	L
Malayic	M
North Borneo	N
South Sulawesi	S

No. code	Name	Alternative names	Dialects	Population	Year	Region	Classification	Lexical Similarity
1 apg	Ampanang			30,000	1981	Kenohan, Kutai Kartanegara Regency, East Kalimantan.	Greater Barito, Barito-Mahakam	
2 bdb	Basap		Jembayan, Bulungan, Berau, Dumaring, Binatang, Karangan.	15,000	2007	East Kalimantan Province, scattered in Bulungan, Sangkulirang, and Kutai regencies.	North Borneo, Rejang–Sajau	
3 bei	Bakati'	Bakati Nyam, Bakati Riok, Bakatiq, Bekati.		4,000	1986	Northwest near Sarawak border, Sambas and Selvas areas.	Land Dayak, Bakati'	
4 bfg	Busang Kayan	Busang, Kajan, Kajang.	Mahakam Busang, Belayan, Long Bleh.	3,000	1981	East Kalimantan Province, upper Mahakam, Oga, Belayan rivers.	North Borneo, North Sarawakan, Kayan-Kenyah, Kayanic, Kayan Proper	
5 bhv	Bahau			19,000	2007	East Kalimantan Province. Northeast, north, and southeast of Busang. Long Apari, Long Pahangai, Long Bagun, and Long Hubung subdistricts, Kutai Barat Regency.	North Borneo, North Sarawakan, Kayan-Kenyah, Kayanic, Kayan Proper	
6 bjn	Banjar	Bandjarese, Banjar Malay, Banjarese, Labuhan.	Kuala, Hulu.	3,502,300 (3,500,000)	2000	Around Banjarmasin south and east; East Kalimantan, coastal regions of Pulau Laut, Kutai and Pasir; Central Kalimantan as far as Sampit. Also in Malaysia (Sabah).	Malayo-Sumbawan, Malayic, Malay	73% with Indonesian [ind], 66% with Tamuan (Malayic Dayak), 45% with Bakumpai [bkr], 35% with Ngaju [nij].
7 bkn	Bukitan	Bakatan, Bakitan, Beketan, Mangkettan, Manketa, Pakatan.	Punan Ukit, Punan Busang.	860 (570)	2000	East Kalimantan Province, Iwan River, Sarawak border. Also in Malaysia (Sarawak).	North Borneo, Melanau-Kajang, Kajang	
8 bkr	Bakumpai	Bakambai, Bara-Jida.	Bakumpai, Mengkatip (Mangkatip, Oloh Mengkatip).	100,000	2003	Central Kalimantan Province. Kapuas and Barito rivers, northeast of Kuala Kapuas.	Greater Barito	75% with Ngaju [nij], 45% with Banjar [bjn].
9 blj	Bolongan	Bulungan.	May be a dialect of Tidong [tid] or Segai [sge].	30,000	2002	East Kalimantan Province, Tanjungselor area, lower Kayan River.	North Borneo, North Sarawakan, Dayic, Murutic, Tidong	
10 bqr	Burusu	Berusuh, Bulusu.		4,350	2007	East Kalimantan Province, Bulungan Regency, Sesayap subdistrict, Sekatakbunyi area, north of Sajau Basap [sjb] language.	North Borneo, Rejang–Sajau	
11 bth	Biatah Bidayuh	Biatah, Bideyu, Landu, Lundu, Pueh, Siburan.		8,480	2000	Northwest Kalimantan, on Sarawak border. Mainly in Sarawak.	Land Dayak, Bidayuh	
12 bve	Berau Malay	Berau, Merau Malay.		11,200	2007	East Kalimantan Province, central coastal area, Tanjungreder and Muaramalinau north to Sepinang south.	Malayo-Sumbawan, Malayic, Malay	
13 bvk	Bukat			400	1981	West Kalimantan Province, northeast near Sarawak border, Kapuas River, southeast of Mendalam. 3 areas.	North Borneo, North Sarawakan, Kayan-Kenyah, Kayanic, Muller-Schwaner 'Punan'	
14 bvu	Bukit Malay	Bukit, Meratus, Bukat.	A variant of Banjar Malay [bjn].	59,000	2007	East Kalimantan Province, southeast, Sampanahan River, northwest of Limbungan.	Malayo-Sumbawan, Malayic, Malay	
15 byd	Benyadu'	Njadu, Nyadu, Balantiang, Balantian.	Pandu, Nyadu (Balantian, Balantiang, Njadu).	54,000	2007	West Kalimantan Province, northwest near Sarawak border, Landak and Bengkayang regencies.	Land Dayak	
16 djo	Jangkang		Jangkang proper, Pompang.	37,000	2007	West Kalimantan Province, Central Sanggau Regency, south of Balai Sebut.	Land Dayak	
17 dun	Dusun Deyah	Deah, Dejah.		20,000	1981	South Kalimantan Province, Tabalong River northeast of Bongkang.	East Barito	53% with Lawangan [lbx], 52% with Tawoyan [twy].
18 duq	Dusun Malang		Bayan, Dusun Malang. Most similar to Ma'anyan [mhy], Paku [pku], Dusun Witu [duw], Malagasy [plt].	4,500 (2,000 Bayan)	2003	Central Kalimantan Province, North Barito Regency, west of Muarainu, northeast of Muarateweh.	Greater Barito	90% between the 2 dialects.
19 duw	Dusun Witu		Dusun Pepas, Dusun Witu. Most similar to Ma'anyan [mhy], Paku, Dusun Malang [duq], Malagasy [plt].	5,000	2003	Central Kalimantan Province, South Barito Regency, Pendang and Buntokecil regions; south of Muarateweh.	Greater Barito	75% with Ma'anyan, 73% with Paku [pku].
20 emb	Embaloh	Malo, Maloh, Matoh, Mbaloh, Memaloh, Palin, Pari, Sangau, Sanggau.	Kalis (Kalis Maloh, Kalis Dayak). Kalis may be a separate language.	10,000	1991	West Kalimantan Province, Kapuas Hulu Regency, south of Sarawak border, upper Kapuas River: Embaloh, Leboyan, Lauh, Palin, Nyabau, Mandai, and Kalis tributaries.	South Sulawesi, Bugis, Tamanic	
21 hov	Hovongan	Punan Bungan.	Hovongan, Penyavung, Semukung Uheng.	1,000	1991	West Kalimantan Province near Sarawak and East Kalimantan Province borders; Kapuas Hulu Regency, far northeast corner.	North Borneo, North Sarawakan, Kayan-Kenyah, Kayanic, Muller-Schwaner 'Punan'	69% with Kereho [xke], 67% with Aoheng [pni].
22 iba	Iban	Sea Dayak.	Batang Lupar, Bugau, Kantu', Ketungau (Air Tabun, Sigarau, Seklau, Sekapat, Banjur, Sebaru', Demam, Maung, Sesat).	15,000 in Kalimantan	2003	West Kalimantan Province, Sarawak border.	Malayo-Sumbawan, Malayic, Ibanic	
23 kkx	Kohin	Bahasa Seruyan, Seruyan.		8,000	2003	Central Kalimantan Province, Kotawaringin Timur Regency, central and north Seruyan River area. 10 villages.	Western Barito	60%–65% with Ot Danum [otd], 50%–69% with Ngaju [nij].
24 knl	Keninjal	Dayak Kaninjal, Kaninjal, Kaninjal Dayak.	Kubing.	32,000	2007	West Kalimantan Province, Sayan and Melawi rivers, Nangapinoh, Nangaella, Nangasayan, Gelalak areas.	Malayo-Sumbawan, Malayic, Kendayan	
25 knx	Kendayan	Baicit, Kendayan-Ambawang, Kendayan Dayak, Damea, Salako.	Ambawang, Kendayan, Ahe, Selako.	290,700 (280,000)	2007	West Kalimantan Province, northeast of Bengkayang, Ledo area, Madi and Papan jungle area; Sambas regency. Also in Malaysia (Sarawak).	Malayo-Sumbawan, Malayic, Kendayan	
26 kqv	Okolod	Kolod, Kolour, Kolur, Okolod Murut.		4,970 (3,390)	2000	East Kalimantan Province along Sabah border, east of Lumbis, north of Lundayeh; also in Sarawak. Also in Malaysia (Sarawak).	North Borneo, North Sarawakan, Dayic, Murutic, Murut	82% with Okolod of Sabah, 70% with Pensiangan Murut dialect of Tagal Murut [mvv], 34% with Lun Bawang [lnd].
27 kzi	Kelabit	Kalabit, Kerabit, Apo Duat.	Lon Bangag, Tring, Bareo (Bario), Pa' Mada, Long Napir.	(640)	2000	East Kalimantan Province, remote mountains, on Sarawak border, northwest of Longkemuat. Mainly in Sarawak.	North Borneo, North Sarawakan, Dayic, Apo Duat	
28 lbx	Lawangan	Luwangan, Northeast Barito.	Ajuh, Bakoi (Lampung), Bantian (Bentian), Banuwang, Bawu (Bawo), Kali, Karau (Beloh), Lawa, Lolang, Mantararen, Njumit, Purai, Purung, Tuwang, Pasir, Benua, Taboyan. At least 17 dialects. Tawoyan [twy] may be inherently intelligible.	100,000	1981	East central Kalimantan, Karau River area.	Eastern Barito	77% with Tawoyan, 53% with Dusun Deyah [dun].
29 lgi	Lengilu			4	2000	Northeast, between Sa'ban and Lundayeh.	North Borneo, North Sarawakan, Dayic, Kelabitic Nearly extinct.	
30 lnd	Lun Bawang	Southern Murut, Lundayeh, Lun Daye, Lun Dayah, Lun Daya, Lun Dayoh, Lundaya Putuk.	Lun Daye, Papadi, Lun Bawang (Long Bawan, Sarawak Murut). Not Murutic, although sometimes called Southern Murut.	47,500 (23,000)	2007	Interior from Brunei Bay to Padas River headwaters, to Baram headwaters, and into East Kalimantan, Indonesian mountains where Sesayap River tributaries arise. Also in Brunei, Malaysia (Sarawak).	North Borneo, North Sarawakan, Dayic, Kelabitic	
31 lra	Rara Bakati'	Luru, Lara', Bekatiq, Bekati' Nyam-Pelayo, Bekati' Kendayan.	Bina'e.	(12,000)	2007	West Kalimantan Province, upper Lundu and Sambas rivers, Bengkayang area east of Gunung Pendering, and north in Pejampi and 2 other villages.	Land Dayak, Bakati'	
32 mhy	Ma'anyan	Ma'anjan, Maanyak Dayak.	Samihim (Buluh Kuning), Sihong (Siong), Dusun Balangan. Related to Malagasy languages in Madagascar.	150,000	2003	Central Kalimantan, Barito Selatan Regency, South Tamianglayang area, Dusun Hilir, Karau Kuala, Dusun Selatan, Dusun Utara, Gunung Bintang Awai, Dusun Tengah, Awang, and Patangkep Tutui subdistricts. Patai River drainage area.	Greater Barito	77% with Paku [pku], 75% with Dusun Witu [duv].
33 mqg	Kota Bangun Kutai Malay		Not intelligible with Tenggarong Kutai Malay [vkt], but may be intelligible with one of its dialects (Northern Kutai).	80,000	1981	East Kalimantan Province, central Mahakam River basin.	Malayo-Sumbawan, Malayic, Malay	
34 msa	Malay							
35 mtd	Mualang		Mualang Ili’, Mualang Ulu. Similar to Iban [iba].	40,000	2007	West Kalimantan Province, Belitang Hilir, Belitang, and Belitang Hulu Sekadau subdistricts, along Ayak and Belitang rivers, about 320 km upstream from Pontianak.	Malayo-Sumbawan, Malayic, Ibanic	
36 mvv	Tagal Murut	Semambu, Semembu, Sumambu, Sumambu-Tagal, Sumambuq.	Rundum (Arundum), Tagal (Tagol, North Borneo Murut, Sabah Murut), Sumambu (Semembu, Sumambuq), Tolokoson (Telekoson), Sapulot Murut (Sapulut Murut), Pensiangan Murut (Pentjangan, Tagul, Taggal, Lagunan Murut), Alumbis (Lumbis, Loembis), Tawan, Tomani (Tumaniq), Maligan (Mauligan, Meligan, Bol Murut, Bole Murut).	2,000	?	East Kalimantan Province, Nunukan Regency, Pegalan Valley, Alumbis River.	North Borneo, North Sarawakan, Dayic, Murutic, Murut	
37 mxd	Modang		Kelingan (Long Wai, Long We), Long Glat, Long Bento’, Benehes, Nahes, Liah Bing.	15,300	1981	East Kalimantan Province, Segah, Kelinjau, and Belayan rivers. 5 areas.	North Borneo, North Sarawakan, Kayan-Kenyah, Kayanic, Modang	
38 nij	Ngaju	Biadju, Dayak Ngaju, Ngadju, Ngaja, Ngaju Dayak, Southwest Barito.	Ba’amang (Bara-Bare, Sampit), Katingan Ngaju, Katingan Ngawa, Kahayan, Kahayan Kapuas, Mantangai (Oloh Mangtangai), Pulopetak. Related to Bakumpai [bkr].	890,000	2003	Kalimantan, Kapuas, Kahayan, Katingan, and Mentaya rivers, south.	Greater Barito	75% with Bakumpai, 62% with Kohin [kkx], 50% with Ot Danum [otd], 35% with Banjar [bjn].
39 otd	Ot Danum	Dohoi, Malahoi, Uud Danum, Uut Danum.	Ot Balawan, Ot Banu’u, Ot Murung 1 (Murung 1, Punan Ratah), Ot Olang, Ot Tuhup, Sarawai (Melawi), Dohoi, Ulu Ai’ (Da’an), Sebaung, Kadorih, Kuhin.	78,800	2007	Upper reaches of south Borneo River, large area south of Schwaner Range. Ulu Ai’ on Mandai River with 7 villages.	Greater Barito	70% with Siang [sya], 65% with Kohin [kkx], 60% with Katingan dialect of Ngaju [nij], 50% with Ngaju (main dialect) [nij].
40 pku	Paku	Bakau.		3,500	2003	Central Kalimantan Province, East Barito Regency, south of Ampah.	East Barito	77% with Ma’anyan [mhy], 73% with Dusun Witu [duv].
41 pni	Aoheng	Penihing.		2,630	1981	East Kalimantan Province, north central near Sarawak border, upper reaches of Kapuas, Barito, and Mahakam rivers.	North Borneo, North Sarawakan, Kayan-Kenyah, Kayanic, Muller-Schwaner 'Punan'	69% with Kereho [xke], 67% with Hovongan [hov].
42 puc	Punan Merap			200	1981	East Kalimantan Province, east of Longkemuat.	North Borneo, Rejang–Sajau	
43 pud	Punan Aput	Aput.	Allegedly unintelligible to other Penan languages.	370	1981	East Kalimantan Province, west and north of Mt. Menyapa.	North Borneo, North Sarawakan, Kayan-Kenyah, Kayanic, Muller-Schwaner 'Punan'	
44 puf	Punan Merah			140	1981	East Kalimantan Province, Mahakam River, east of Ujohhilang.	North Borneo, North Sarawakan, Kayan-Kenyah, Kayanic, Muller-Schwaner 'Punan'	
45 puj	Punan Tubu		Not a Kenyah language (Soriente 2003).	2,000	1981	East Kalimantan Province, Malinau, Mentarang, and Sembakung rivers, coastal. 8 locations.	North Borneo, North Sarawakan, Punan Tubu	
46 put	Putoh	Putuk.	Pa Kembaloh, Abai. May be the same as Lun Bawang [lnd].	6,000	1981	East Kalimantan Province, east of Lundayeh and Sa'ban, Mentarang River, Longberang, Mensalong, Bangalan areas.	North Borneo, North Sarawakan, Dayic, Kelabitic	
47 rir	Ribun		Ribun, Bekidoh.	45,000	1981	West Kalimantan Province, Kapuas Hulu Regency, Tayan Hulu subdistrict.	Land Dayak	
48 sbr	Sembakung Murut	Sembakoeng, Sembakong, Simbakong, Tingalun, Tinggalan, Tinggalum.		5,180 (3,180)	2000	East Kalimantan Province, Nunukan Regency, Sembakung River mouth into Sabah. Also in Malaysia (Sabah).	North Borneo, North Sarawakan, Dayic, Murutic, Tidong	
49 sbx	Seberuang		Quite similar to Desa.	37,000	2007	West Kalimantan Province, Kapuas area from Nanga Silat to Selimbau, on Belimbing, Lebang, Belitang, Seauk, Tempunak, Selimbau, Silat rivers.	Malayo-Sumbawan, Malayic, Ibanic	
50 scg	Sanggau		Dosan, Mayau, Sanggau. Very heterogeneous dialects, probably more than 1 language in this group—not all Sanggau isolects mutually intelligible. Koman and Semerawai could be part of this group.	45,000	1981	West Kalimantan Province, Sanggau Regency, Kapuas River.	Land Dayak	
51 sdm	Semandang	Kualan-Semandang.	Semandang, Gerai, Beginci, Bihak, Komi.	20,000	?	West Kalimantan Province, Ketapang Regency, Kualan and Semandang rivers.	Land Dayak	
52 sdo	Bukar-Sadong Bidayuh	Buka, Bukar, Bukar Sadong, Bukar Sadung Bidayah, Sabutan, Sadong, Serian, Tebakang.	Bukar Sadong, Bukar Bidayuh (Bidayuh, Bidayah).	?		West Kalimantan Province, Sarawak border, Sanggau and Sintang regencies.	Land Dayak, Bidayuh	
53 sge	Segai	Called Segayi by the Berau, Ga’ay by the Kenyah and Kayan.	Kelai, Segah.	2,000	1981	East Kalimantan province, Berau regency, Kelai River and around Longlaai.	North Borneo, North Sarawakan, Kayan-Kenyah, Kayanic, Modang	
54 sjb	Sajau Basap	Sajau, Sujau.	Punan Sajau, Punan Basap, Punan Batu 2. Related to Basap [bdb].	6,000	1981	East Kalimantan Province, Berau and Bulungan regencies, northeast of Muaramalinau.	North Borneo, Rejang–Sajau	
55 slg	Selungai Murut	Murut.		1,240 (640)	2000	North Kalimantan province, Nunukan Regency east of Lumbis on upper reaches of Sembakung River. Also in Malaysia (Sabah).	North Borneo, North Sarawakan, Dayic, Murutic, Murut	
56 snv	Sa'ban	Saban, Merau.		(850)	2000	North Kalimantan province, Nunukan Regency, Sarawak border, south of Lundayeh.	North Borneo, North Sarawakan, Dayic, Kelabitic	
57 sre	Sara Bakati'	Sara, Riok.	Some dialect differences. Unidirectional intelligibility from Sara to Rara-Bakati’.	4,000	?	West Kalimantan province, near Sanggau-Ledo northeast of Ledo.	Land Dayak, Bakati'	
58 sya	Siang	Ot Siang.	Siang, Murung 2. Related to Dohoi.	60,000	1981	Central Kalimantan Province, Murung Raya Regency, east of Dohoi.	Greater Barito	
59 tid	Tidong	Camucones, Tedong, Tidoeng, Tidung, Tiran, Tirones, Tiroon, Zedong.	Nonukan (Nunukan), Penchangan, Sedalir (Salalir, Sadalir, Saralir, Selalir), Tidung, Tarakan (Terakan), Sesayap (Sesajap), Sibuku.	47,000 (27,000)	2007	North Kalimantan province, Bulungan Regency, Sembakung and Sibuka rivers, coast and islands around Tarakan and interior, Malinau River. Also in Malaysia (Sabah).	North Borneo, North Sarawakan, Dayic, Murutic, Tidong	
60 tjg	Tunjung	Tunjung Dayak.	Tunjung (Tunjung Tengah), Tunjung Londong, Tunjung Linggang, Pahu.	50,000	1981	East Kalimantan Province, West Kutai Regency, between Adas, Dempar, Melak, and east around the lake; south Muntaiwan area.	Greater Barito, Barito-Mahakam	
61 tmn	Taman	Dayak Taman, Taman Dayak.		30,000	2007	West Kalimantan Province, Kapuas Hulu regency, Kapuas River, upriver from Putussibau; Mendalam and Sibau tributaries.	South Sulawesi, Bugis, Tamanic	
62 tsg	Tausug	Joloano Sulu, Moro Joloano, Sooloo, Sulu, Suluk, Taosug, Tausog, Taw Sug.		(12,000)	1981	Northeast Kalimantan coastal settlements, immigrants from Sulu Archipelago in the Philippines.	Philippine, Greater Central Philippine, Central Philippine, Bisayan, Butuan–Tausug	
63 twy	Tawoyan	Tabojan, Tabojan Tongka, Taboyan, Tabuyan, Tawoyan Dayak, Tewoyan.		20,000	1981	East Central around Palori.	Greater Barito	77% with Lawangan [lbx], 52% with Dusun Deyah.
64 ulu	Uma' Lung	Oma Longh.	Marginally intelligible with Uma Lasan [xky].	3,000	2006	East Kalimantan Province, Malinau regency mostly, Pimping, Long Setulang, Batu Kajang, Long Uli, Long Belua villages.	North Borneo, North Sarawakan, Kayan-Kenyah, Kenyah, Upper Pujungan	
65 vkt	Tenggarong Kutai Malay	Kutai, Tenggarong.	Tenggarong Kutai, Ancalong Kutai, Northern Kutai. Many dialects. Tenggarong and Kota Bangun (Malay, Kota Bangun Kutai [mqg]) are not inherently intelligible. Shares phonological innovations with Berau Malay [bve], Banjar [bjn], and Brunei [xkd].	210,000 (100,000 in Tenggarong, 60,000 in Ancalong, 50,000 in Northern Kutai.)	1981	East Kalimantan Province, Mahakam River basin, east central coastal area, from Sepinang and Tg; Mangkalihat north to Muarabadak and Samarinda south.	Malayo-Sumbawan, Malayic, Malay	
66 whk	Wahau Kenyah	Wahau Kenya, Lebu’ Kulit.	Uma Timai, Lebu’ Kulit, Uma’ Ujok.	8,000	2007	East Kalimantan Province, upper Mahakam River, Batu Majang, Buluk Sen, Uma’ Dian, Muara Pedohon, Kampung Baru, Uma’ Bekuai, Tabang Lama villages.	North Borneo, North Sarawakan, Kayan-Kenyah, Kenyah, Kayanic Kenyah	
67 whu	Wahau Kayan	Wahau Kajan.		500	1981	East Kalimantan Province, north of Muara Wahau.	North Borneo, North Sarawakan, Kayan-Kenyah, Kayanic, Kayan Proper	
68 xay	Kayan Mahakam			1,300	1981	East Kalimantan Province, West Kutai and Malinau regencies, 2 areas.	North Borneo, North Sarawakan, Kayan-Kenyah, Kayanic, Kayan Proper	
69 xdy	Malayic Dayak	Bamayo, Bumayoh.	Tapitn, Banana’, Kayung (Kayong), Delang, Semitau, Suhaid, Mentebah-Suruk, Arut (Sukarame), Lamandau (Landau Kantu), Sukamara (Kerta Mulya), Riam (Nibung Terjung), Belantikan (Sungkup), Tamuan, Tomun, Pangin, Sekakai, Silat. Listed dialects form a chain and may constitute 3 or more languages. Related to Kendayan [knx] and Keninjal [knl].	520,000 (300 Tapitn, 100,000 Banana’, 100,000 Kayung, 200,000 Delang, 10,000 Semitau, 10,000 Suhaid, 20,000 Mentebah-Suruk)	1981	Large portions of eastern West Kalimantan and western Central Kalimantan provinces. Banana’ and Tapitn are western, between Singakawang, Bengkayang, Darit, and Sungairaya; Kayung and Delang are southern, between Sandai, Muarakayang, Pembuanghulu, Sukamara, and Sukaraja; Semitau, Suhaid, and Mentebah-Suruk are eastern, southeast of Kapuas River from Sintang to Putus Sibau.	Malayo-Sumbawan, Malayic, Malay	
70 xem	Kembayan	Karambai.		11,000	2007	West Kalimantan Province, near Sarawak border, Balaikarangan, Kembayan, Landak River area.	Land Dayak	
71 xkd	Mendalam Kayan	Mendalam Kajan.		1,500	1981	West Kalimantan Province, northeast of Putus Sibau, Mendalam River.	North Borneo, North Sarawakan, Kayan-Kenyah, Kayanic, Kayan Proper	
72 xke	Kereho	Keriau Punan.	Busang (Kereho-Busang), Seputan, Uheng (Kereho-Uheng).	500	2003	West Kalimantan Province, far east Kapuas Hulu Regency, near Sarawak border, Kereho River.	North Borneo, North Sarawakan, Kayan-Kenyah, Kayanic, Muller-Schwaner 'Punan'	69% with Hovongan [hov], 69% with Aoheng [pni].
73 xkl	Mainstream Kenyah	Usun Apau Kenyah, Highland Kenyah.	Lepo’ Tau, Lepo’ Bem, Uma’ Jalan, Uma’ Tukung, Lepo’ Ke, Lepo’ Kuda, Lepo’ Maut, Lepo’ Ndang, Badeng, Bakung, Lepo’ Tepu’.	32,000 (12,000)	2007	East Kalimantan Province, Malinau Regency, Pimping, Long Setulang, Batu Kajang, Long Uli, Long Belua villages, Kayan, Mahakam, Upper Baram, Bahau, Upper Balui, Malinau, Belayan, and Telen river areas. Also in Malaysia (Sarawak).	North Borneo, North Sarawakan, Kayan-Kenyah, Kenyah	
74 xkn	Kayan River Kayan	Kajang, Kayan River Kajan.	Uma Leken, Kayaniyut Kayan, Uma Laran.	2,000	1981	East Kalimantan Province, Kayan River, 2 areas.	North Borneo, North Sarawakan, Kayan-Kenyah, Kayanic, Kayan Proper	
75 xky	Uma' Lasan	Western Kenyah.	Uma’ Alim, Uma’ Lasan, Uma’ Baka.	(1,500)	2003, 2005	East Kalimantan Province, Malinau regency, primarily Long Pujungan and Long Jelet Mesahan villages, also Long Pejalin (Uma’ Alim).	North Borneo, North Sarawakan, Kayan-Kenyah, Kenyah, Upper Pujungan	

== See also ==
- Greater North Borneo languages
