= List of Dayak groups of West Kalimantan =

The following is a list of Dayak groups and their respective languages in West Kalimantan province, Indonesia:

== List ==
Group	Subgroup	Language	Regency	Branch
Angan		Mali	Landak	Bidayuh
Badat		Badat	Sanggau	Bidayuh
Bakati'	Bakati' Kanayatn Satango	Bakati'	Bengkayang	Bidayuh
Bakati'	Bakati' Kuma	Bakati'	Bengkayang?	Bidayuh
Bakati'	Bakati' Lape	Bakati'	Bengkayang	Bidayuh
Bakati'	Bakati' Lumar	Bakati'	Bengkayang	Bidayuh
Bakati'	Bakati' Palayo	Bakati'	Bengkayang	Bidayuh
Bakati'	Bakati' Payutn	Bakati'	Bengkayang	Bidayuh
Bakati'	Bakati' Rara	Bakati'	Sambas, Bengkayang	Bidayuh
Bakati'	Bakati' Riok	Bakati'	Bengkayang	Bidayuh
Bakati'	Bakati' Sara	Bakati'	Bengkayang	Bidayuh
Bakati'	Bakati' Sebiha'	Bakati'	Bengkayang	Bidayuh
Bakati'	Bakati' Subah	Bakati'	Sambas, Bengkayang	Bidayuh
Bakati'	Bakati' Tari'	Bakati'	Bengkayang	Bidayuh
Balantiatn		Balantiatn-Banyadu'	Sanggau, Landak	Bidayuh
Banyadu'		Banyadu'	Bengkayang, Landak	Bidayuh
Banyuke	Banyuke-Angkabakng	Banyuke (Ba'ampape)	Landak	Malayic
Banyuke	Banyuke-Banokng	Banyuke (Ba'ampape)	Landak	Malayic
Banyuke	Banyuke-Moro Batukng	Bangae' Moro	Landak	Malayic
Banyuke	Banyuke-Sakanis	Banyuke (Ba'ampape)	Landak	Malayic
Banyuke	Banyuke-Satolo	Banyuke (Ba'ampape)	Landak	Malayic
Banyuke	Banyuke-Satona	Banyuke (Ba'ampape)	Landak	Malayic
Banyuke	Banyuke-Songga Batukng	Banyuke (Ba'ampape)	Landak	Malayic
Barai		Barai (Bekotu' Bekoya')	Sintang	Malayic
Batu Entawa'		Batu Entawa'	Melawi	Malayic
Baya		Baya	Ketapang	Malayic
Beginci		Beginci	Ketapang	Malayic
Behe		Kendayan (Balangitn dialect)	Landak	Malayic
Benawas		Benawas	Sekadau	Malayic
Bi Somu		Bi Somu	Sanggau	Bidayuh
Bihak		Bihak	Ketapang	Malayic
Bubung		Bubung (Badeneh)	Landak	Bidayuh
Bugau		Benadai	Sekadau, Sintang	Ibanic
Buket		Buket	Kapuas Hulu	Kayanic
Bukit Talaga		Talaga-Ngabukit	Landak	Malayic
Butok		Butok	Bengkayang	Bidayuh
Dait		Kendayan (Balangitn dialect)	Landak	Malayic
Daro'		Daro'	Sanggau	? Bidayuh
Desa [désa]		Desa	Sanggau	Malayic
Desa [dəsa]		Desa	Sekadau, Sintang	Ibanic
Dosatn		Dosatn	Sanggau	Bidayuh
Ella		Ella beape-ape	Melawi	Malayic
Ensilat		Ensilat	Kapuas Hulu	Ibanic
Entabang		Entabang/Entebang	Sanggau	Bidayuh
Gerai		Gerai	Ketapang	Malayic
Gerunggang		Gerunggang	Ketapang	Malayic
Golik		Golik	Sanggau	Bidayuh
Goneh		Beabon-abon	Sintang	Malayic
Gun		Gun	Sanggau	Bidayuh
Hibun		Hibun	Sanggau	Bidayuh
Iban		Iban (Benaday)	Kapuas Hulu, Sanggau	Ibanic
Inggar Silat		Inggar Silat	Sintang	Ibanic
Jagoi		Jagoi (Bidoi')	Bengkayang	Bidayuh
Jalai	Benatu	Jalai Benatu	Ketapang	Malayic
Jalai	Penyarang	Jalai Penyarang	Ketapang	Malayic
Jalai	Perigi	Jalai Perigi	Ketapang	Malayic
Jalai	Pringkunyit	Jalai Pringkunyit	Ketapang	Malayic
Jalai	Riam	Jalai Riam	Ketapang	Malayic
Jalai	Sumanjawat	Jalai Sumanjawat	Ketapang	Malayic
Jalai	Tanjung	Jalai Tanjung	Ketapang	Malayic
Jalai	Tembiruhan	Jalai Tembiruhan	Ketapang	Malayic
Jangkang	Jangkang Benua	Jangkang	Sanggau	Bidayuh
Jangkang	Jangkang Engkarong	Jangkang	Sanggau	Bidayuh
Jangkang	Jangkang Jungur Tanjung	Jangkang	Sanggau	Bidayuh
Jangkang	Jangkang Kopa	Jangkang	Sanggau	Bidayuh
Jawatn		Jawatn	Sekadau	Malayic
Joka'		Randau Joka'	Ketapang	? Malayic or Bidayuh
Kalis		Kalis	Kapuas Hulu	Tamanic
Kanayatn	Ambawang-Mampawah	Kanayatn (Banana'/Ba'ahe)	Pontianak	Malayic
Kanayatn	Kanayatn-Banana'-Mampawah-Babaras	Kanayatn (Banana'/Ba'ahe)	Landak	Malayic
Kanayatn	Kanayatn-Banana'-Mampawah-Ipuh	Kanayatn (Banana'/Ba'ahe)	Landak	Malayic
Kanayatn	Kanayatn-Banana'-Mampawah-Pulo Padakng Sairi	Kanayatn (Banana'/Ba'ahe)	Landak	Malayic
Kanayatn	Kanayatn-Banana'-Mampawah-Sabawis	Kanayatn (Banana'/Ba'ahe)	Landak	Malayic
Kanayatn	Kanayatn-Banana'-Mampawah Salutukng	Kanayatn (Banana'/Ba'ahe)	Landak	Malayic
Kanayatn	Bukit-Sairi	Kanayatn (Banana'/Ba'ahe)	Landak	Malayic
Kanayatn	Bukit-Samih	Kanayatn (Banana'/Ba'ahe)	Landak	Malayic
Kanayatn	Bukit Sidik	Kanayatn (Banana'/Ba'ahe)	Landak	Malayic
Kanayatn	Bukit Tarap	Kanayatn (Banana'/Ba'ahe)	Landak	Malayic
Kanayatn	Capala	Kanayatn (Banana'/Ba'ahe)	Bengkayang	Malayic
Kanayatn	Mampawah (Kanayatn-Mampawah)	Kanayatn (Banana'/Ba'ahe)	Pontianak	Malayic
Kanayatn	Kanayatn-Mampawah-Banana'-Badamea Sangkikng	Kanayatn (Banana'/Ba'ahe)	Pontianak	Malayic
Kanayatn	Kanayatn-Mampawah-Batukng	Kanayatn (Banana'/Ba'ahe)	Landak	Malayic
Kanayatn	Kanayatn-Mampawah-Buah Muda'	Kanayatn (Banana'/Ba'ahe)	Landak	Malayic
Kanayatn	Kanayatn-Mampawah-Kaca	Kanayatn (Banana'/Ba'ahe)	Landak	Malayic
Kanayatn	Kanayatn-Mampawah-Lumut	Kanayatn (Banana'/Ba'ahe)	Landak	Malayic
Kanayatn	Kanayatn-Mampawah-Moton Buliat	Kanayatn (Banana'/Ba'ahe)	Pontianak	Malayic
Kanayatn	Kanayatn-Mampawah-Ngabakng-Bonsoratn	Kanayatn (Banana'/Ba'ahe)	Pontianak	Malayic
Kanayatn	Kanayatn-Mampawah-Oha'	Kanayatn (Banana'/Ba'ahe)	Landak	Malayic
Kanayatn	Kanayatn-Mampawah-Pak Nungkat	Kanayatn (Banana'/Ba'ahe)	Pontianak	Malayic
Kanayatn	Kanayatn-Mampawah-Pak Utan	Kanayatn (Banana'/Ba'ahe)	Pontianak	Malayic
Kanayatn	Kanayatn-Mampawah-Pinyuh Gersik	Kanayatn (Banana'/Ba'ahe)	Pontianak	Malayic
Kanayatn	Kanayatn-Mampawah-Saba'u	Kanayatn (Banana'/Ba'ahe)	Landak	Malayic
Kanayatn	Kanayatn-Mampawah-Samaya'	Kanayatn (Banana'/Ba'ahe)	Pontianak	Malayic
Kanayatn	Kanayatn-Mampawah-Saputukng	Kanayatn (Banana'/Ba'ahe)	Landak	Malayic
Kanayatn	Kanayatn-Mampawah-Sua' Barangan	Kanayatn (Banana'/Ba'ahe)	Pontianak	Malayic
Kanayatn	Padakng	Bakambai	Landak	Bidayuh
Kanayatn	Samaroa	Kanayatn (Banana'/Ba'ahe)	Landak	Malayic
Kanayatn	Sapari	Kanayatn (Banana'/Ba'ahe)	Landak	Malayic
Kanayatn	Sawak-Badamea	Kanayatn (Banana'/Ba'ahe)	Bengkayang	Malayic
Kanayatn	Soari	Kanayatn (Banana'/Ba'ahe)	Landak	Malayic
Kancikng		Kancikng (Bemedeh)	Ketapang, Sanggau	Bidayuh
Kantu'		Kantu'	Kapuas Hulu	Ibanic
Kayaan		Kayaan	Kapuas Hulu	Kayanic
Kayan		Beabon-abon	Sintang	Malayic
Kayong		Kayong	Ketapang	Malayic
Kebahan		Beabon-abon	Sintang	Malayic
Keluas		Keluas	Melawi	Malayic
Kendawangan	Air Durian	Kendawangan Air Durian	Ketapang	Malayic
Kendawangan	Air Upas	Kendawangan Air Upas	Ketapang	Malayic
Kendawangan	Batu Payung	Kendawangan Batu Payung	Ketapang	Malayic
Kendawangan	Belaban	Kendawangan Belaban	Ketapang	Malayic
Kendawangan	Membulu'	Kendawangan Membulu'	Ketapang	Malayic
Kendawangan	Menggaling	Kendawangan Menggaling	Ketapang	Malayic
Kendawangan	Pelanjau	Kendawangan Pelanjau	Ketapang	Malayic
Kendawangan	Sekakai	Kendawangan Sekakai	Ketapang	Malayic
Kendawangan	Sempadian	Kendawangan Sempadian	Ketapang	Malayic
Keneles		Keneles (Bekay)	Sanggau	Bidayuh
Keninjal		Keninjal	Melawi	Malayic
Kenyilu		Kenyilu	Melawi	Malayic
Kepuas		Kepuas	Melawi	Malayic
Kerabat		Kerabat	Sekadau	Malayic
Keramay		Keramay	Sanggau	Bidayuh
Ketior		Ketior	Sanggau	Malayic
Ketungau	Ketungau Air Tabun	Benadai	Sintang	Ibanic
Ketungau	Ketungau Banjur	Benadai	Sintang	Ibanic
Ketungau	Ketungau Begelang	Benadai	Sintang	Ibanic
Ketungau	Ketungau Demam	Benadai	Sintang	Ibanic
Ketungau	Ketungau Embarak	Benadai	Sintang	Ibanic
Ketungau	Ketungau Kumpang	Benadai	Sintang	Ibanic
Ketungau	Ketungau Mandau	Benadai	Sintang	Ibanic
Ketungau	Ketungau Merakai	Benadai	Sintang	Ibanic
Ketungau	Ketungau Sebaru'	Benadai	Sintang	Ibanic
Ketungau	Ketungau Sekalau	Benadai	Sintang	Ibanic
Ketungau	Ketungau Sekapat	Benadai	Sintang	Ibanic
Ketungau	Ketungau Senangan	Benadai	Sintang	Ibanic
Ketungau Sesae'		Ketungau Sesae'	Sekadau	Ibanic
Kodatn		Kodatn	Sanggau	Bidayuh
Koman		Koman	Sekadau	Bidayuh
Konyeh		Senduruhan	Ketapang	Malayic
Kowotn		Kowotn	Bengkayang	Bidayuh
Krio		Krio	Ketapang	Malayic
Kubitn		Kubitn (Abon)	Melawi	Malayic
Lamantawa		Lamantawa	Melawi	Malayic
Lau'		Lau'	Kapuas Hulu	Tamanic
Laur		Laur	Ketapang	Bidayuh
Laya		Laya	Sanggau	Bidayuh
Lebang		Nado/Nto	Sintang	Malayic
Lemandau		Lemandau	Ketapang	Malayic
Liboy		Liboy	Bengkayang	Bidayuh
Limbai		Limbai	Melawi	Malayic
Linoh		Linoh	Melawi	Malayic
Mahap		Mahap	Sekadau	Malayic
Mali		Mali	Sanggau, Landak, Ketapang	Bidayuh
Mayan		Mayan	Kapuas Hulu	Malayic
Mayau		Mayau	Sanggau	? Bidayuh
Melahoi		Melahoi	Sintang	Malayic
Mentebah		Mentebah	Kapuas Hulu	Malayic
Menterap Kabut		Menterap Kabut	Sekadau	Malayic
Menterap Sekado		Menterap Sekado	Sekadau	Malayic
Mentuka'		Mentuka'	Sekadau	Bidayuh
Mualang		Mualang	Sekadau, Sintang	Ibanic
Muara		Muara	Sanggau	Bidayuh
Mudu'		Mudu'	Sanggau	Bidayuh
Nahaya'		Nahaya'	Landak	Malayic
Nanga		Beabon-abon	Sintang	Malayic
Nyadupm		Beapay-apay	Melawi	Malayic
Oruung Da'an		Oruung Da'an	Kapuas Hulu	Barito
Pandu		Panu	Sanggau	Bidayuh
Pangin		Pangin	Melawi	Barito
Pantu		Pantu Bamak	Landak	Bidayuh
Papak		Beabon-abon	Sintang	Malayic
Paus		Paus	Sanggau	Bidayuh
Pawatn		Pawatn	Ketapang	Malayic
Paya'		Beabon-abon	Sintang	Malayic
Pesaguan	Batu Tajam	Batu Tajam	Ketapang	Malayic
Pesaguan	Kekura'	Kekura'	Ketapang	Malayic
Pesaguan	Kengkubang	Kengkubang	Ketapang	Malayic
Pesaguan	Marau	Marau	Ketapang	Malayic
Pesaguan	Pesaguan Hulu	Pesaguan Hulu	Ketapang	Malayic
Pesaguan	Pesaguan Kanan	Pesaguan Kanan	Ketapang	Malayic
Pesaguan	Sepauhan	Sepauhan	Ketapang	Malayic
Pompakng		Pompakng	Sanggau	Bidayuh
Pruna'		Mali	Sanggau	Bidayuh
Pruwan		Pruwan	Sanggau	Bidayuh
Punan		Punan	Kapuas Hulu	Kayanic
Punti		Punti	Sanggau	Bidayuh
Randu'		Randu'	Melawi	Malayic
Ransa		Ransa	Melawi	Malayic
Rantawan		Rantawan Baaje'	Landak	Bidayuh
Rembay		Rembay	Kapuas Hulu	Ibanic
Salako	Salako Badamea-Gajekng	Salako	Bengkayang	Malayic
Salako	Salako Garantukng Sakawokng	Salako	Sambas	Malayic
Sami		Sami	Sanggau	Bidayuh
Sane		Sane	Melawi	Malayic
Sangku'		Sangku' (Balangin)	Landak	Malayic
Sapatoi		Sapatoi	Landak	Bidayuh
Sawai		Sawai	Sekadau	Malayic
Sebaru'		Sebaru'	Kapuas Hulu	Ibanic
Seberuang		Seberuang	Kapuas Hulu, Sekadau, Sintang	Ibanic
Sekajang		Sekajang	Sanggau	Bidayuh
Sekapat		Sekapat	Kapuas Hulu	Ibanic
Sekubang		Sekubang	Sintang	Malayic
Sekujam		Sekujam	Sekadau, Sintang	Ibanic
Selawe		Selawe	Sintang	Malayic
Selibong		Selibong (Bamak)	Landak	Bidayuh
Senangkatn		Senangkatn	Sanggau	Bidayuh
Sengkunang		Baaje'	Landak	Bidayuh
Seritok		Kendayan (Balangitn dialect)	Landak	Malayic
Sikukng		Sikukng	Bengkayang, Sanggau	Bidayuh
Silatn Muntak		Silatn Muntak	Melawi	Malayic
Simpakng	Banyur	Banyur	Ketapang	Bidayuh
Simpakng	Kualatn	Kualatn	Ketapang	Bidayuh
Simpakng	Sajan	Sajan	Ketapang	Bidayuh
Simpakng	Semanakng	Semanakng	Ketapang	Bidayuh
Sisang		Sisang	Sanggau	? Bidayuh
Sontas		Sontas	Sanggau	Bidayuh
Suaid		Suaid	Kapuas Hulu	Malayic
Sum		Sum	Sanggau	? Bidayuh
Suru'		Suru' Ilir	Kapuas Hulu	Malayic
Suru'		Suru' Ulu	Kapuas Hulu	Malayic
Suruh		Suruh	Sanggau	Bidayuh
Suti		Suti Bamayo	Bengkayang	Bidayuh
Taba		Taba	Sanggau	Bidayuh
Tadietn		Tadietn	Bengkayang	Bidayuh
Tamambalo		Tamambalo	Kapuas Hulu	Tamanic
Taman		Taman	Kapuas Hulu	Tamanic
Taman Sekado		Taman Sekado	Sekadau	Malayic
Tameng		Tameng	Bengkayang	Bidayuh
Tawaeq		Tawaeq	Bengkayang	Bidayuh
Tayap	Kebuai	Kebuai	Ketapang	Malayic
Tayap	Pangkalan Suka	Pangkalan Suka	Ketapang	Malayic
Tayap	Suka Maju	Suka Maju	Ketapang	Malayic
Tebang		Cempede' (Benyupm)	Ketapang, Sanggau	Malayic
Tebidah		Beabon-abon	Sintang	Malayic
Tengon		Tengon	Landak	Bidayuh
Tinying		Tinying	Sanggau	? Bidayuh
Tobak		Tebang/Tobak	Sanggau	Malayic
Tola'		Tola'	Kayong Utara	Malayic
Ulu Sekadau		Ulu Sekado	Sekadau	Malayic
Undau		Undau	Sintang	Malayic
Uud Danum	Cihie	Cihie	Sintang	Barito
Uud Danum	Dohoi	Dohoi	Sintang	Barito

== See also ==
- Dayak people
