= List of districts of West Kalimantan =

The province of West Kalimantan in Indonesia is divided into regencies which in turn are divided administratively into districts, known as Kecamatan.

The districts of West Kalimantan, with the regency each falls into, are as follows:

- Air Besar (Big Water), Landak
- Air Upas (Upas Water), Ketapang
- Ambalau, Sintang
- Anjongan, Pontianak Regency
- Badau, Kapuas Hulu
- Balai, Sanggau
- Banyuke Hulu, Landak
- Batang Lupar, Kapuas Hulu
- Batu Ampar (Ampar Stone), Kubu Raya
- Batu Datu (Datu Stone), Kapuas Hulu
- Beduai, Sanggau
- Belimbing, Melawi
- Belimbing Hulu, Melawi
- Belitang, Sekadau
- Belitang Hilir, Sekadau
- Belitang Hulu, Sekadau
- Bengkayang, Bengkayang
- Benua Kayong, Ketapang
- Bika, Kapuas Hulu
- Binjai Hulu, Sintang
- Bonti, Sanggau
- Boyan Tanjung, Kapuas Hulu
- Bunut Hilir, Kapuas Hulu
- Bunut Hulu, Kapuas Hulu
- Capkala, Bengkayang
- Dedai, Sintang
- Delta Pawan, Ketapang
- Ella Hilir, Melawi
- Embaloh Hilir, Kapuas Hulu
- Embaloh Hulu, Kapuas Hulu
- Embau, Kapuas Hulu
- Empanang, Kapuas Hulu
- Entikong, Sanggau
- Galing, Sambas
- Hulu Gurung, Kapuas Hulu
- Hulu Sungai, Ketapang
- Jagoi Babang, Bengkayang
- Jangkang, Sanggau
- Jawai, Sambas
- Jawai Selatan (South Jawai), Sambas
- Jelai Hulu, Ketapang
- Jelimpo, Landak
- Kalis, Kapuas Hulu
- Kapuas, Sanggau
- Kayan Hilir, Sintang
- Kayan Hulu, Sintang
- Kelam Permai, Sintang
- Kembayan, Sanggau
- Kendawangan, Ketapang
- Ketungau Hilir, Sintang
- Ketungau Hulu, Sintang
- Ketungau Tengah (Central Ketungau), Sintang
- Kuala Behe, Landak
- Kuala Mandor B, Kubu Raya
- Kubu, Kubu Raya
- Ledo, Bengkayang
- Lembah Bawang (Onion Valley), Bengkayang
- Lumar, Bengkayang
- Mandor, Landak
- Manis Mata, Ketapang
- Marau, Ketapang
- Matan Hilir Selatan (South Matan Hilir), Ketapang
- Matan Hilir Utara (North Matan Hilir), Ketapang
- Meliau, Sanggau
- Mempawah Hulu, Landak
- Mempawah Hilir, Pontianak Regency
- Mempawah Timur (East Mempawah), Pontianak Regency
- Menjalin, Landak
- Mentebah, Kapuas Hulu
- Menukung, Melawi
- Menyuke, Landak
- Meranti, Landak
- Monterado, Bengkayang
- Muara Pawan (Pawan Estuary), Ketapang
- Mukok, Sanggau
- Nanga Mahap, Sekadau
- Nanga Pinoh, Melawi
- Nanga Taman, Sekadau
- Nanga Tayap, Ketapang
- Ngabang, Landak
- Noyan, Sanggau
- Paloh, Sambas
- Parindu, Sanggau
- Pemahan, Ketapang
- Pemangkat, Sambas
- Pinoh Selatan (South Pinoh), Melawi
- Pinoh Utara (North Pinoh), Melawi
- Pontianak Barat (West Pontianak), Pontianak City
- Pontianak Kota (the City of Pontianak), Pontianak City
- Pontianak Selatan (South Pontianak), Pontianak City
- Pontianak Tengah (Central Pontianak), Pontianak City
- Pontianak Tenggara (Southeast Pontianak), Pontianak City
- Pontianak Timur (East Pontianak), Pontianak City
- Pontianak Utara (North Pontianak), Pontianak City
- Pulau Maya Karimata (Maya Karimata Island), North Kayong
- Puring Kencana, Kapuas Hulu
- Putussibau Selatan (South Putussibau), Kapuas Hulu
- Putussibau Utara, (North Putussibau), Kapuas Hulu
- Rasau Jaya, Kubu Raya
- Sadaniang, Pontianak Regency
- Sajad, Sambas
- Sajingan Besar (Big Sajingan), Sambas
- Salamantan, Bengkayang
- Salatiga, Sambas
- Sambas, Sambas
- Sandai, Ketapang
- Sanggau Ledo, Bengkayang
- Sayan, Melawi
- Sebangki, Landak
- Sebawi, Sambas
- Seberuang, Kapuas Hulu
- Segedong, Pontianak Regency
- Sejangkung, Sambas
- Sekadau Hilir, Sekadau
- Sekadau Hulu, Sekadau
- Sekayam, Sanggau
- Selakau, Sambas
- Selakau Timur (East Selakau), Sambas
- Selimbau, Kapuas Hulu
- Seluas, Bengkayang
- Semitau, Kapuas Hulu
- Semparuk, Sambas
- Sengah Temila, Landak
- Sepauk, Sintang
- Seponti, North Kayong
- Serawai, Sintang
- Siantan, Pontianak Regency
- Siding, Bengkayang
- Silat Hilir, Kapuas Hulu
- Silat Hulu, Kapuas Hulu
- Simpang Dua, Ketapang
- Simpang Hilir, North Kayong
- Simpang Hulu, Ketapang
- Singkawang Barat (West Singkawang), Singkawang City
- Singkawang Selatan (South Singkawang), Singkawang City
- Singkawang Tengah (Central Singkawang), Singkawang City
- Singkawang Timur (East Singkawang), Singkawang City
- Singkawang Utara (North Singkawang), Singkawang City
- Singkup, Ketapang
- Sintang, Sintang
- Sokan, Melawi
- Sompak, Landak
- Subah, Sambas
- Suhaid, Kapuas Hulu
- Sukadana, North Kayong
- Sungai Ambawang (Ambawang River), Kubu Raya
- Sungai Betung (Betung River), Bengkayang
- Sungai Kakap (Kakap River), Kubu Raya
- Sungai Kunyit (Turmeric River), Pontianak Regency
- Sungai Laur (Laur River), Ketapang
- Sungai Melayu Rayak (Rayak Malay River), Ketapang
- Sungai Pinyuh (Pinyuh River), Pontianak Regency
- Sungai Raya (Raya River), Bengkayang
- Sungai Raya (Raya River), Kubu Raya
- Sungai Raya Kepulauan(Raya River Islands), Bengkayang
- Sungai Tebelian (Tebelian River), Sintang
- Suti Semarang, Bengkayang
- Tanah Pinoh, Melawi
- Tanah Pinoh Barat (West Tanah Pinoh), Melawi
- Tangaran, Sambas
- Tayan Hilir, Sanggau
- Tayan Hulu, Sanggau
- Tebas, Sambas
- Tekarang, Sambas
- Teluk Batang (Batang Bay), North Kayong
- Teluk Keramat (Sacred Bay), Sambas
- Teluk Pakedai (Pakedai Bay), Kubu Raya
- Tempunak, Sintang
- Terentang, Kubu Raya
- Teriak, Bengkayang
- Toba, Sanggau
- Toho, Pontianak Regency
- Tujuh Belas (Seventeen), Bengkayang
- Tumbang Titi, Ketapang
