= Ibanic languages =

Branch of the Malayic languages

Ibanic
- Malayic Dayak
- Geographic distribution: western Borneo
- Linguistic classification: Austronesian: Malayo-Polynesian; (disputed); Malayic; Ibanic

Language codes
- Glottolog: iban1263 (Ibanic)

The Ibanic languages are a branch of the Malayic languages indigenous to western Borneo. They are spoken by the Ibans and related groups in East Malaysia and the Indonesian province of West Kalimantan. Other Dayak languages, called Land Dayak, which are not Ibanic, are found in the northwest corner of Kalimantan, between Ibanic and non-Ibanic Malayic languages such as Kendayan and the Malay dialects of Sarawak and Pontianak.

The term Ibanic is coined by Alfred B. Hudson, who was among the first to investigate the genetic affiliation of various languages lumped together under the name Dayak in West Borneo. Ibanic has been variously classified as belonging to a larger "Malayic Dayak" or "West Bornean Malayic" subgroup along with Kendayan and related varieties, or as a part of the "Nuclear Malayic" subgroup alongside other Malay dialects.

== Languages ==
According to Ethnologue, four languages belong to the Ibanic subgroup: Iban, Remun (or Milikin), Mualang, Seberuang, and Keninjal.

== West Kalimantan groups ==
List of Ibanic-speaking Dayak ethnic subgroups and their respective languages in West Kalimantan province, Indonesia:

Group	Subgroup	Language	Regency
Bugau		Benadai	Sekadau, Sintang
Desa [dəsa]		Desa	Sekadau, Sintang
Ensilat		Ensilat	Kapuas Hulu
Iban		Iban (Benaday)	Kapuas Hulu, Sanggau
Inggar Silat		Inggar Silat	Sintang
Kantu'		Kantu'	Kapuas Hulu
Ketungau	Ketungau Air Tabun	Benadai	Sintang
Ketungau	Ketungau Banjur	Benadai	Sintang
Ketungau	Ketungau Begelang	Benadai	Sintang
Ketungau	Ketungau Demam	Benadai	Sintang
Ketungau	Ketungau Embarak	Benadai	Sintang
Ketungau	Ketungau Kumpang	Benadai	Sintang
Ketungau	Ketungau Mandau	Benadai	Sintang
Ketungau	Ketungau Merakai	Benadai	Sintang
Ketungau	Ketungau Sebaru'	Benadai	Sintang
Ketungau	Ketungau Sekalau	Benadai	Sintang
Ketungau	Ketungau Sekapat	Benadai	Sintang
Ketungau	Ketungau Senangan	Benadai	Sintang
Ketungau Sesae'		Ketungau Sesae'	Sekadau
Mualang		Mualang	Sekadau, Sintang
Rembay		Rembay	Kapuas Hulu
Sebaru'		Sebaru'	Kapuas Hulu
Seberuang		Seberuang	Kapuas Hulu, Sintang
Sekapat		Sekapat	Kapuas Hulu
Sekujam		Sekujam	Sekadau, Sintang
