= Punan Merah language =

Austronesian language spoken in Kalimantan, Indonesia

Punan Merah
- Native to: Indonesia
- Region: East Kalimantan
- Native speakers: (140 cited 1981)
- Language family: Austronesian: Malayo-Polynesian; Greater North Borneo; Central Sarawak; Punan–Müller-Schwaner; Punan; Punan Merah

Language codes
- ISO 639-3: puf
- Glottolog: puna1268
- ELP: Punan Merah

Punan Merah is a Punan language of East Kalimantan, Indonesia, one of several spoken by the Punan people.
