= Land Dayak languages =

Subgroup of the Austronesian language family

Land Dayak
- Bidayuh
- Geographic distribution: Indonesia (Borneo and Sumatra)
- Ethnicity: Bidayuh
- Linguistic classification: Austronesian: Malayo-Polynesian; Greater North Borneo ?; Land Dayak
- Subdivisions: Bekatiʼ; Bida; Southern; (Rejang)

Language codes
- ISO 639-2 / 5: day
- ISO 639-3: (dyk deprecated in 2008 as spurious)
- Glottolog: land1261

The Land Dayak languages are a group of dozen or so languages spoken by the Bidayuh (Land Dayaks) of northwestern Borneo, and according to some sources, also spoken by the Rejang people of southwestern Sumatra, Indonesia.

== Languages ==
=== Glottolog ===
Glottolog classifies the Land Dayak languages as follows.

- Benyadu-Bekatiʼ: Bekatiʼ (Bekatiq), Sara, Laraʼ (Rara), Benyaduʼ
- Bidayuh:
  - Bukar–Sadong (Serian)
  - Biatah–Tringgus, Jagoi (Bau and Jagoi Babang district of Bengkayang Regency)
- Southern: Djongkang, Kembayan (both in Sanggau Regency), Semandang (mainly in northern part of Ketapang Regency), Ribun, Sanggau

In 2020, Semandang was split into Beginci, Gerai, and Semandang for ISO 639-3 by SIL International.

=== Smith (2017) ===
Smith (2017) classifies the Land Dayak languages as follows.

- Banyadu-Bekati (Banyadu, Bekati, Rara, Lara)
- Bidayuh-Southern Land Dayak
  - Bidayuh (Bau-Jagoi, Bukar-Sadong, Sungkung, Hliboi, Biatah)
  - Southern Land Dayak (Golik, Jangkang, Ribun, Sanggau, Simpang)

== West Kalimantan groups ==
List of Bidayuh-speaking Dayak ethnic subgroups and their respective languages in West Kalimantan province, Indonesia:

| Group | Subgroup | Language | Regency |
|---|---|---|---|
| Angan | | Mali | Landak |
| Badat | | Badat | Sanggau |
| Bakati' | Bakati' Kanayatn Satango | Bakati' | Bengkayang |
| Bakati' | Bakati' Kuma | Bakati' | Bengkayang? |
| Bakati' | Bakati' Lape | Bakati' | Bengkayang |
| Bakati' | Bakati' Lumar | Bakati' | Bengkayang |
| Bakati' | Bakati' Palayo | Bakati' | Bengkayang |
| Bakati' | Bakati' Payutn | Bakati' | Bengkayang |
| Bakati' | Bakati' Rara | Bakati' | Sambas, Bengkayang |
| Bakati' | Bakati' Riok | Bakati' | Bengkayang |
| Bakati' | Bakati' Sara | Bakati' | Bengkayang |
| Bakati' | Bakati' Sebiha' | Bakati' | Bengkayang |
| Bakati' | Bakati' Subah | Bakati' | Sambas, Bengkayang |
| Bakati' | Bakati' Tari' | Bakati' | Bengkayang |
| Balantiatn | | Balantiatn-Banyadu' | Sanggau, Landak |
| Banyadu' | | Banyadu' | Bengkayang, Landak |
| Bi Somu | | Bi Somu | Sanggau |
| Bubung | | Bubung (Badeneh) | Landak |
| Butok | | Butok | Bengkayang |
| Dosatn | | Dosatn | Sanggau |
| Entabang | | Entabang/Entebang | Sanggau |
| Golik | | Golik | Sanggau |
| Gun | | Gun | Sanggau |
| Hibun | | Hibun | Sanggau |
| Jagoi | | Jagoi (Bidoi') | Bengkayang |
| Jangkang | Jangkang Benua | Jangkang | Sanggau |
| Jangkang | Jangkang Engkarong | Jangkang | Sanggau |
| Jangkang | Jangkang Jungur Tanjung | Jangkang | Sanggau |
| Jangkang | Jangkang Kopa | Jangkang | Sanggau |
| Kanayatn | Padakng | Bakambai | Landak |
| Kancikng | | Kancikng (Bemedeh) | Ketapang, Sanggau |
| Keneles | | Keneles (Bekay) | Sanggau |
| Keramay | | Keramay | Sanggau |
| Kodatn | | Kodatn | Sanggau |
| Koman | | Koman | Sekadau |
| Kowotn | | Kowotn | Bengkayang |
| Laur | | Laur | Ketapang |
| Laya | | Laya | Sanggau |
| Liboy | | Liboy | Bengkayang |
| Mali | | Mali | Sanggau, Landak, Ketapang |
| Mentuka' | | Mentuka' | Sekadau |
| Muara | | Muara | Sanggau |
| Mudu' | | Mudu' | Sanggau |
| Pandu | | Panu | Sanggau |
| Pantu | | Pantu Bamak | Landak |
| Paus | | Paus | Sanggau |
| Pompakng | | Pompakng | Sanggau |
| Pruna' | | Mali | Sanggau |
| Pruwan | | Pruwan | Sanggau |
| Punti | | Punti | Sanggau |
| Rantawan | | Rantawan Baaje' | Landak |
| Sami | | Sami | Sanggau |
| Sapatoi | | Sapatoi | Landak |
| Sekajang | | Sekajang | Sanggau |
| Selibong | | Selibong (Bamak) | Landak |
| Senangkatn | | Senangkatn | Sanggau |
| Sengkunang | | Baaje' | Landak |
| Sikukng | | Sikukng | Bengkayang, Sanggau |
| Simpakng | Banyur | Banyur | Ketapang |
| Simpakng | Kualatn | Kualatn | Ketapang |
| Simpakng | Sajan | Sajan | Ketapang |
| Simpakng | Semanakng | Semanakng | Ketapang |
| Sontas | | Sontas | Sanggau |
| Suruh | | Suruh | Sanggau |
| Suti | | Suti Bamayo | Bengkayang |
| Taba | | Taba | Sanggau |
| Tadietn | | Tadietn | Bengkayang |
| Tameng | | Tameng | Bengkayang |
| Tawaeq | | Tawaeq | Bengkayang |
| Tengon | | Tengon | Landak |

Some possible Bidayuh-speaking Dayak ethnic subgroups and their respective languages in West Kalimantan province, Indonesia:

| Group | Subgroup | Language | Regency |
|---|---|---|---|
| Daro' | | Daro' | Sanggau |
| Mayau | | Mayau | Sanggau |
| Sisang | | Sisang | Sanggau |
| Sum | | Sum | Sanggau |
| Tinying | | Tinying | Sanggau |
| Joka' | | Randau Joka' | Ketapang |

== Bibliography ==
- Noeb, Jonas; Rensch, Calvin R.; Rensch, Carolyn M.; Ridu, Robert Sulis. 2012. The Bidayuh Language: Yesterday, Today and Tomorrow (Revised and Expanded). SIL Electronic Survey Report. SIL International.
