= Laraʼ language =

Austronesian language spoken on Borneo

Laraʼ
- Native to: Indonesia, Malaysia
- Region: Borneo
- Native speakers: (23,000 cited 2000–2004)
- Language family: Austronesian: Malayo-Polynesian; Land Dayak; Bekati’; Laraʼ

Language codes
- ISO 639-3: lra
- Glottolog: rara1235

Laraʼ (also called Luru, Berkati, Bakati, Bekatiq, Bekatiʼ Nyam-Pelayo, Bekatiʼ Kendayan, and Rara Bakatiʼ) is a language spoken by some 19,000 people in Borneo, on both the Indonesian side (West Kalimantan) and Malaysian side (Sarawak) of the island. Most information about it has been gathered by various Christian missionary groups.
