= Sara Bakati' language =

Austronesian language spoken in Kalimantan, Indonesia

Sara
- Native to: Indonesia
- Region: near Sanggau Ledo, northeast of Ledo, Kalimantan
- Native speakers: 4,000 (2004)
- Language family: Austronesian: Malayo-Polynesian; Land Dayak; Bekati’; Sara

Language codes
- ISO 639-3: sre
- Glottolog: sara1329
- ELP: Sara

The Sara language is a language spoken in Kalimantan in Indonesia by about 200 people.
