= Bukat language =

Language of West Kalimantan, Indonesia

Bukat
- Native to: Indonesia
- Region: West Kalimantan
- Native speakers: (400 cited 1981)
- Language family: Austronesian: Malayo-Polynesian; Greater North Borneo; Central Sarawak; Punan–Müller-Schwaner; Punan; Bukat

Language codes
- ISO 639-3: bvk
- Glottolog: buka1261

Bukat is a language of West Kalimantan, Indonesia, one of several spoken by the Penan people.
