= Ribun language =

Dayak language of Borneo

Ribun
- Native to: Indonesia
- Region: Kalimantan
- Native speakers: (45,000 cited 1981)
- Language family: Austronesian: Malayo-Polynesian; Land Dayak; Southern Land Dayak; Ribun

Language codes
- ISO 639-3: rir
- Glottolog: ribu1241

Ribun is a Dayak language of Borneo.

== Phonology ==
=== Consonants ===
		Labial	Alveolar	Palatal	Velar	Glottal
Nasal		m	n	ɲ	ŋ	
Plosive/ Affricate	voiceless	p	t	tʃ	k	ʔ
Plosive/ Affricate	voiced	b	d	dʒ	ɡ	
Fricative			s			h
Trill			r			
Approximant		w	l	j		

=== Vowels ===
	Front	Central	Back
High	i		u
Mid	e	ə	o
Low		a	
