= Tringgus language =

Austronesian language spoken in Sarawak, Malaysia

Tringgus
- Native to: Malaysia, Indonesia
- Region: Sarawak
- Native speakers: 850 in Malaysia (2007)
- Language family: Austronesian: Malayo-Polynesian; Land Dayak; Bidayuh; Biatah–Tringgus; Tringgus
- Dialects: Gumbang?

Language codes
- ISO 639-3: trx
- Glottolog: trin1271

Tringgus is a Dayak language of Borneo.
