= Modang language =

Austronesian language spoken in Kalimantan, Indonesia

Modang
- Native to: Indonesia
- Region: East Kalimantan
- Native speakers: (15,000 cited 1981)
- Language family: Austronesian: Malayo-Polynesian; Greater North Borneo ?; Kayanic; Modang–Segai; Modang

Language codes
- ISO 639-3: mxd
- Glottolog: moda1244

Modang is a Kayan language spoken in East Kalimantan, Indonesia.
