= Sanggau language =

Dayak language spoken on Borneo

Sanggau
- Native to: Indonesia
- Region: Kalimantan
- Native speakers: (45,000 cited 1981)
- Language family: Austronesian: Malayo-Polynesian; Greater North Borneo; Land Dayak; Sanggau
- Dialects: Sanggau proper; Dosan; Mayau; ?Koman; ?Semerawai

Language codes
- ISO 639-3: scg
- Glottolog: sang1339

Sanggau is a Dayak language of Borneo. Sanggau varieties are quite divergent, and may be distinct languages.
