= Kembayan language =

Dayak language spoken on Borneo

Kembayan
- Mateq
- Native to: Indonesia
- Region: Kalimantan
- Native speakers: 11,000 (2007)
- Language family: Austronesian: Malayo-Polynesian; Land Dayak; Southern Land Dayak; Kembayan

Language codes
- ISO 639-3: xem
- Glottolog: kemb1249

Kembayan, or Mateq (Mate'), is a Dayak language of Borneo.

== Phonology ==
Consonants
	Labial	Alveolar	Palatal	Velar	Glottal
Plosive	p b	t d	tʃ dʒ	k g	ʔ
Prenasalized	ᵐp (ᵐb)	ⁿt ⁿd ⁿs	ⁿtʃ ⁿdʒ	ᵑk ᵑg	
Fricative		s			h
Nasal	m mː	n nː	ɲ	ŋ	
Approximant	w	r, l	j		

- The phoneme /ᵐb/ is only attested in a single word that has likely been borrowed.

Vowels
	Front	Central	Back
High	i ĩ	ɨ ɨ̃	u ũ
Mid-high	e ẽ		o õ
Mid-low			ɔ ɔ̃
Low		a ã	

Additionally, the following diphthongs are attested: /ɨi/, /ai/, /oi/, /ia/, /ɨa/, /ua/, /io/, /ao/, /iu/, /au/, /ou/.
