= Biatah language =

Language

Biatah
- Native to: Malaysia
- Region: Borneo
- Ethnicity: Bidayuh
- Native speakers: (72,000 cited 2000)
- Language family: Austronesian: Malayo-Polynesian; Land Dayak; Bidayuh; Biatah–Tringgus; Biatah

Language codes
- ISO 639-3: bth
- Glottolog: biat1246

The Biatah language is spoken in the Malaysian state of Sarawak and the Indonesian province of West Kalimantan. It belongs to the Malayo-Polynesian branch of the Austronesian language family.

== Phonology ==
=== Consonants ===
		Labial	Alveolar	Palatal	Velar	Glottal
Plosive/ Affricate	voiceless	p	t	(t͡ʃ)	k	ʔ
Plosive/ Affricate	voiced	b	d	d͡ʒ	g	
Fricative			s			h
Nasal		m	n	ɲ	ŋ	
Trill			r			
Approximant		w	(l)	j		

- [t͡ʃ] and [l] are heard in other dialects.

=== Vowels ===
	Front	Central	Back
Close	i	ɨ	u
Mid	e	ə	o
Open		a	ɔ

- /i, u, e, o/ can have allophones of [ɪ, ʊ, ɛ, ɔ].
