= Nyaduʼ language =

Austronesian language spoken in Kalimantan, Indonesia

Nyaduʼ
- Benyaduʼ
- Native to: Indonesia
- Region: Kalimantan
- Native speakers: 54,000 (2007)
- Language family: Austronesian: Malayo-Polynesian; Greater North Borneo; Land Dayak; Bekati; Nyaduʼ

Language codes
- ISO 639-3: byd
- Glottolog: beny1237

A Benyadu', or Nyadu', speaker, recorded in Borneo.

The Nyaduʼ language, Benyaduʼ, is a Dayak language of Borneo.

== Phonology ==
=== Consonants ===
		Labial	Alveolar	Palatal	Velar	Glottal
Nasal	voiced	m	n	ɲ	ŋ	
Nasal	prestopped	ᵖm	ᵗn		ᵏŋ	
Plosive	voiceless	p	t	c	k	ʔ
Plosive	voiced	b	d	ɟ	ɡ	
Fricative			s			h
Trill			r			
Approximant		w	l	j		

- Sounds /c, ɟ/ may also be pronounced as affricates as [cç, ɟʝ] or [tʃ, dʒ].

=== Vowels ===
Vowels are heard as /i, e, a, o, u/.
