= Segai language =

Austronesian language spoken in Kalimantan, Indonesia

Segai
- Punan Kelai
- Native to: Indonesia
- Region: East Kalimantan
- Native speakers: (30,000 cited 1981–2002)
- Language family: Austronesian: Malayo-Polynesian; Greater North Borneo ?; Kayanic; Modang–Segai; Segai
- Dialects: Kelai; Segah

Language codes
- ISO 639-3: sge
- Glottolog: sega1243

Segai, also known as Punan Kelai, is a Kayanic language spoken in several communities along the Kelai River, Berau Regency, East Kalimantan, Indonesia.

== Phonology ==
=== Consonants ===
Consonant phonemes of Punan Kelai
		Labial	Alveolar	Palatal	Velar	Glottal
Nasal		m	n	ɲ	ŋ	
Plosive	voiceless	p	t	c	k	ʔ
Plosive	voiced	b	d	ɟ	ɡ	
Fricative			s			h
Liquid			l, r			
Glide		w				

=== Vowels ===
Vowel phonemes of Punan Kelai
	Front	Central	Back
Close	i		u
Mid	e, ɛ	ə	o
Open	æ	a	ɒ

Diphthongs also occur as [iw, ew, æw, əw], [ao̯, ai̯, ae̯], [uj, oj].
