= Mempawah Regency =

Regency in West Kalimantan, Indonesia

Mempawah Regency Kabupaten Mempawah
- Regency
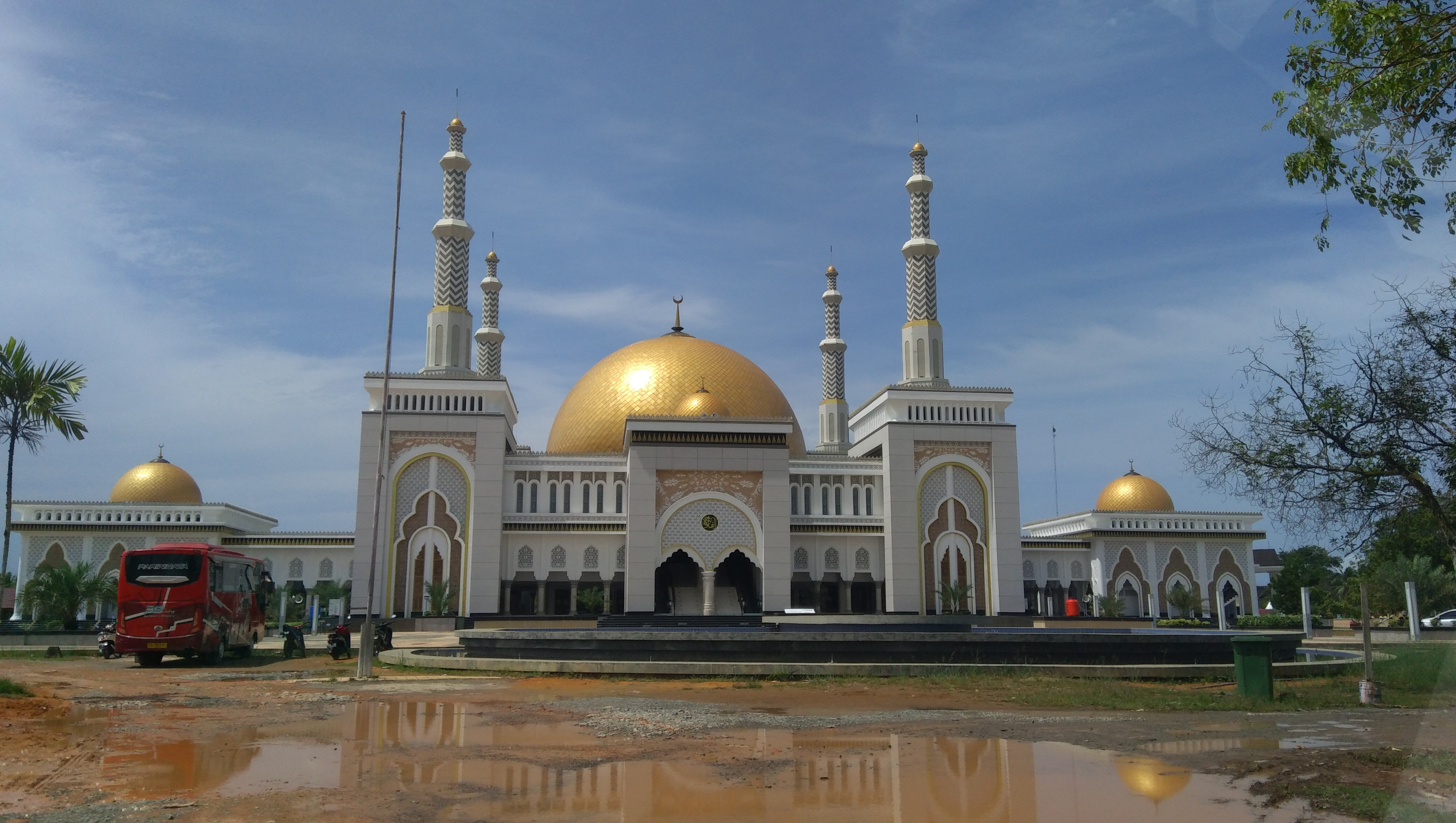
- Al-Falah Great Mosque, Mempawah

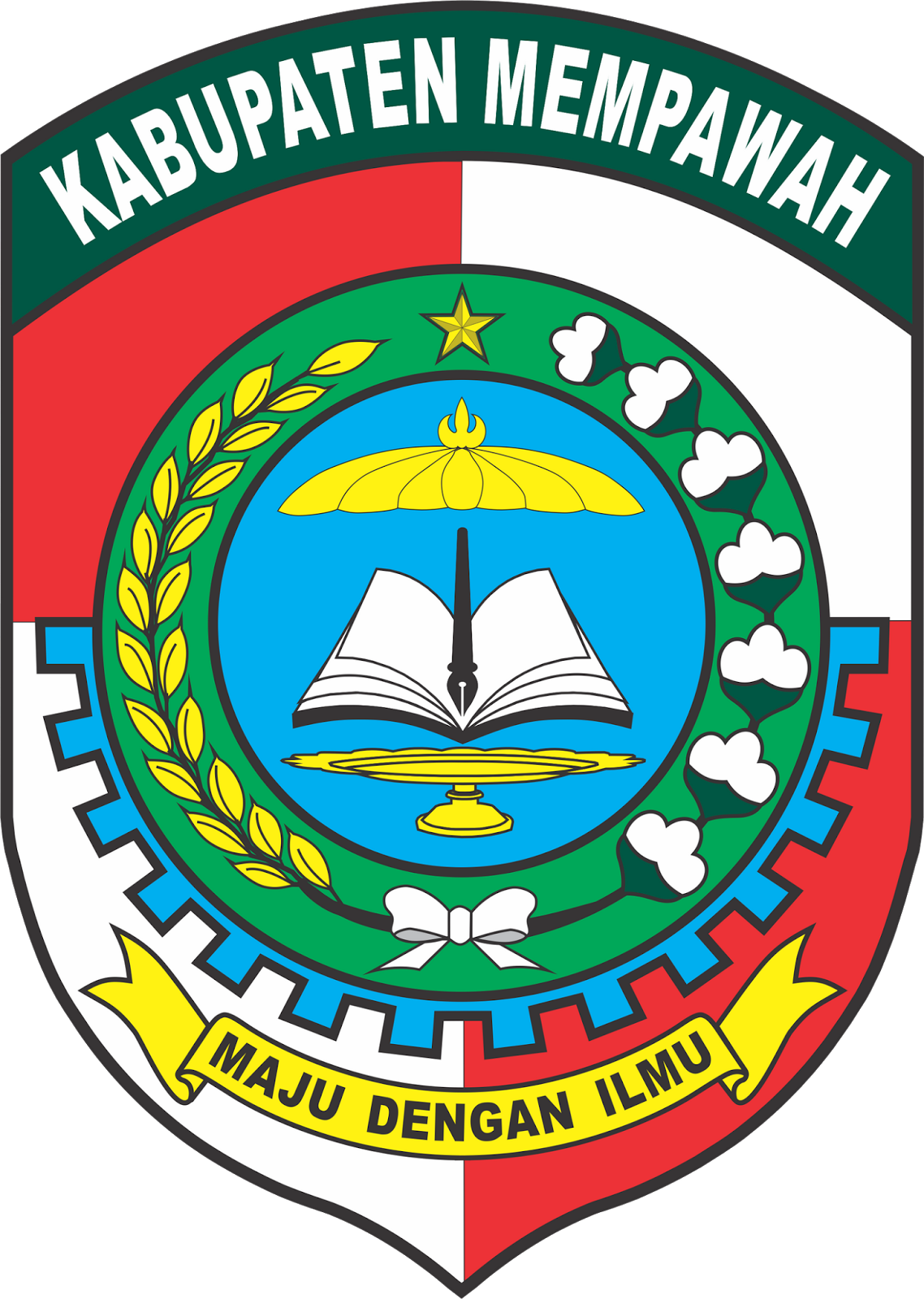
- Coat of arms
- Motto(s): Maju dengan Ilmu; Forward with knowledge
- Location within West Kalimantan

- Location in Kalimantan and Indonesia Mempawah Regency (Indonesia)
- Coordinates: 0.2500°N 109.1667°E
- Country: Indonesia
- Province: West Kalimantan
- Capital: Mempawah

Government
  - Regent: Erlina
  - Vice Regent: Juli Suryadi Burdadi

Area
  - Total: 1,934.83 km^{2} (747.04 sq mi)

Population (mid 2025 estimate)
  - Total: 320,630
  - Density: 165.71/km^{2} (429.20/sq mi)
- Time zone: UTC+7 (IWST)
- Area code: (+62) 561
- Website: mempawahkab.go.id

Mempawah or Mempawah Regency (formerly called the Pontianak Regency) is a regency of West Kalimantan Province of Indonesia. Originally including a wider area of West Kalimantan, this Pontianak Regency was reduced on 4 October 1999 by the north-eastern districts (formerly the majority of the regency's land area) being removed to form a new Landak Regency, and was further reduced on 17 July 2007 by its southern districts cut out to create a new Kubu Raya Regency. Since 2007 the residual regency (renamed Mempawah Regency in 2014) covers 1,934.83 km^{2}, and had a population of 234,021 at the 2010 Census and 301,560 at the 2020 Census; the official estimate as at mid 2025 was 320,630 (comprising 163,915 males and 157,715 females). The administrative centre is at the town of Mempawah, in Mempawah Hilir District.

== History ==
On 5 February 1963, the administrative centre of Pontianak Regency was moved from Pontianak to Mempawah based on Minister of General Government and Regional Autonomy Decree No. Des.52/1/9-11 (Surat Keputusan Menteri Pemerintahan Umum Otonomi Daerah Nomor Des.52/1/9-11).

Based on Government Regulation No. 58 of 2014 (Peraturan Pemerintah Nomor 58 Tahun 2014), Pontianak Regency was formally renamed Mempawah Regency after the name of its administrative centre.

== Administrative districts ==
When Pontianak Regency was originally created, it consists into the districts of Sungai Kunyit, Mempawah Hilir, Sungai Pinyuh, Toho, Siantan, Mandor, Menjalin, Mempawah Hulu, Menyuke, Sengah Temila, Air Besar, Ngabang, Sungai Raya, Sungai Kakap, Kubu, Terentang, Teluk Pakedai and Batu Ampar. On 1 April 1961, a new district named Sungai Ambawang was established from the northern part of Sungai Raya district. On 17 June 1996, Meranti district was established by split off from the northeastern part of Menyuke district. On 25 March 1999, three new districts were established (Kuala Mandor B was cut out from the northern part of Sungai Ambawang district, Kuala Behe and Sebangki districts were cut out from the southern parts of Air Besar and Sengah Temila districts, respectively). When Landak Regency was established in the same year, the north-eastern districts (including Kuala Behe and Sebangki, which were established few months earlier) became part of the newly-created regency.

In 2001, a new district named Rasau Jaya was established from the eastern part of Sungai Kakap district. In 2005, two new districts were established (Segedong district was split off from the northern part of Siantan district and Anjongan district was split off from the north-eastern part of Sungai Pinyuh district). The following year, another two districts were created (Sadaniang district was cut out from the western part Toho and Mempawah Timur was cut out from the eastern part of Mempawah Hilir).

Since the separation of the southern parts of the former Pontianak Regency on 17 July 2007 to form the new Kubu Raya Regency, the residual area - in 2014 renamed as Mempawah Regency - consists of nine districts (kecamatan), tabulated below with their areas and their populations at the 2010 Census and the 2020 Census, together with the official estimates as at mid 2025. The table also includes the locations of the district administrative centres, the number of administrative villages in each district (a total of 60 rural desa and 7 urban kelurahan), and its post code.

| Kode Wilayah | Name of District (kecamatan) | Year formed | Area in km^{2} | Pop'n Census 2010 | Pop'n Census 2020 | Pop'n Estimate mid 2025 | Admin centre | No. of villages | Post code |
|---|---|---|---|---|---|---|---|---|---|
| 61.02.08 | Siantan (Jongkat) | — | 290.93 | 40,360 | 50,275 | 52,571 | Jungkat | 5 | 78352 |
| 61.02.15 | Segedong | 2007 (from Siantan) | 273.45 | 20,249 | 26,149 | 27,824 | Parit Bugis | 6 | 78351 |
| 61.02.07 | Sungai Pinyuh (Pinyuh River) | — | 171.11 | 47,311 | 61,352 | 65,415 | Sungai Pinyuh | 9 ^{(a)} | 78354 |
| 61.02.16 | Anjongan | 2005 (from Sungai Pinyuh) | 124.28 | 16,628 | 20,878 | 21,916 | Anjungan Melancar | 5 ^{(b)} | 78353 |
| 61.02.01 | Mempawah Hilir (Lower Mempawah) | — | 154.13 | 34,328 | 44,936 | 48,130 | Terusan | 8 ^{(c)} | 78911: 78919 |
| 61.02.18 | Mempawah Timur (East Mempawah) | 2006 (from part of Mempawah Hilir) | 120.39 | 25,220 | 33,761 | 36,555 | Antibar | 8 ^{(d)} | 78915 & 78919 |
| 61.02.12 | Sungai Kunyit (Kunyit River) | — | 129.23 | 22,069 | 28,380 | 30,137 | Sungai Kunyit Laut | 12 | 78371 |
| 61.02.06 | Toho | — | 226.01 | 17,724 | 23,613 | 25,508 | Pak Laheng | 8 | 78360 |
| 61.02.17 | Sadaniang | 2006 (from Toho) | 445.30 | 10,132 | 12,216 | 12,574 | Pentek | 6 | 78361 |
| | Totals | | 1,934.83 | 234,012 | 301,560 | 320,630 | Mempawah | 67 | |

Notes: (a) including the kelurahan of Sungai Pinyuh (with 21,449 inhabitants in mid 2024).
(b) including the kelurahan of Anjungan Melancar (with 8,706 inhabitants as at mid 2024).
(c) including the 3 kelurahan of Terusan (with 13,175 inhabitants as at mid 2024), Tengah (6,621) and Tanjung (1,217).
(d) including the 2 kelurahan of Pasir Wan Salim (with 3,824 inhabitants as at mid 2024) and Pulau Pedalaman (742).

== Climate ==
Climate data for Mempawah (1991−2020 normals)
| Month | Jan | Feb | Mar | Apr | May | Jun | Jul | Aug | Sep | Oct | Nov | Dec | Year |
|---|---|---|---|---|---|---|---|---|---|---|---|---|---|
| Mean daily maximum °C (°F) | 31.0 (87.8) | 31.1 (88.0) | 31.4 (88.5) | 31.6 (88.9) | 31.8 (89.2) | 31.7 (89.1) | 31.6 (88.9) | 31.7 (89.1) | 31.5 (88.7) | 31.3 (88.3) | 31.1 (88.0) | 30.9 (87.6) | 31.4 (88.5) |
| Daily mean °C (°F) | 27.5 (81.5) | 27.6 (81.7) | 28.1 (82.6) | 28.6 (83.5) | 28.9 (84.0) | 28.7 (83.7) | 28.1 (82.6) | 28.3 (82.9) | 28.1 (82.6) | 27.9 (82.2) | 27.9 (82.2) | 27.7 (81.9) | 28.1 (82.6) |
| Mean daily minimum °C (°F) | 23.9 (75.0) | 23.9 (75.0) | 24.0 (75.2) | 24.2 (75.6) | 24.4 (75.9) | 24.2 (75.6) | 23.8 (74.8) | 23.8 (74.8) | 23.9 (75.0) | 24.0 (75.2) | 24.1 (75.4) | 24.1 (75.4) | 24.0 (75.2) |
| Average precipitation mm (inches) | 198.7 (7.82) | 131.9 (5.19) | 143.3 (5.64) | 193.6 (7.62) | 227.1 (8.94) | 189.3 (7.45) | 183.3 (7.22) | 136.5 (5.37) | 198.0 (7.80) | 252.2 (9.93) | 274.4 (10.80) | 280.8 (11.06) | 2,409.1 (94.85) |
| Average precipitation days (≥ 1.0 mm) | 15.2 | 11.3 | 12.0 | 14.2 | 14.6 | 12.3 | 11.5 | 9.8 | 12.6 | 18.0 | 19.2 | 18.6 | 169.3 |
Source: World Meteorological Organization

== Gallery ==
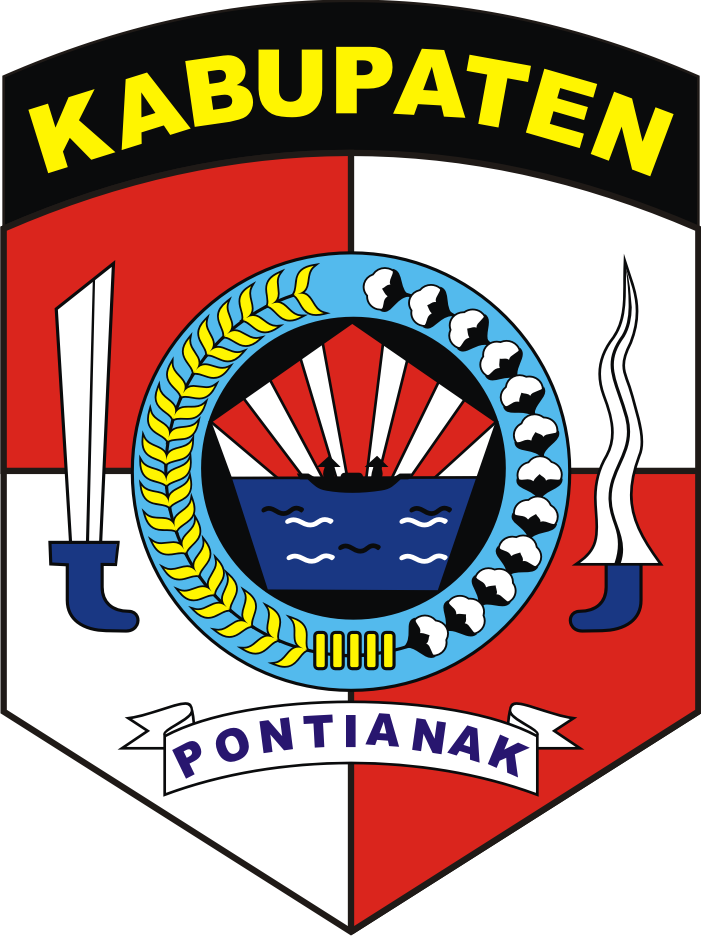
Emblem of the former Pontianak Regency (1963-2014). To prevent confusion with Pontianak City and the creation of Landak Regency and Kubu Raya Regency from its territory, the residual part of this regency was in 2014 renamed as Mempawah Regency.
