= Jangkang language =

Dayak language spoken on Borneo

Jangkang
- Djongkang
- Native to: Indonesia
- Region: Kalimantan
- Native speakers: 37,000 (2007)
- Language family: Austronesian: Malayo-Polynesian; Land Dayak; Southern Land Dayak; Jangkang

Language codes
- ISO 639-3: djo
- Glottolog: jang1257

Jangkang (Djongkang) is a Dayak language of Borneo.
