= Landak Regency =

Regency in West Kalimantan, Indonesia

Landak Regency Kabupaten Landak
- Regency
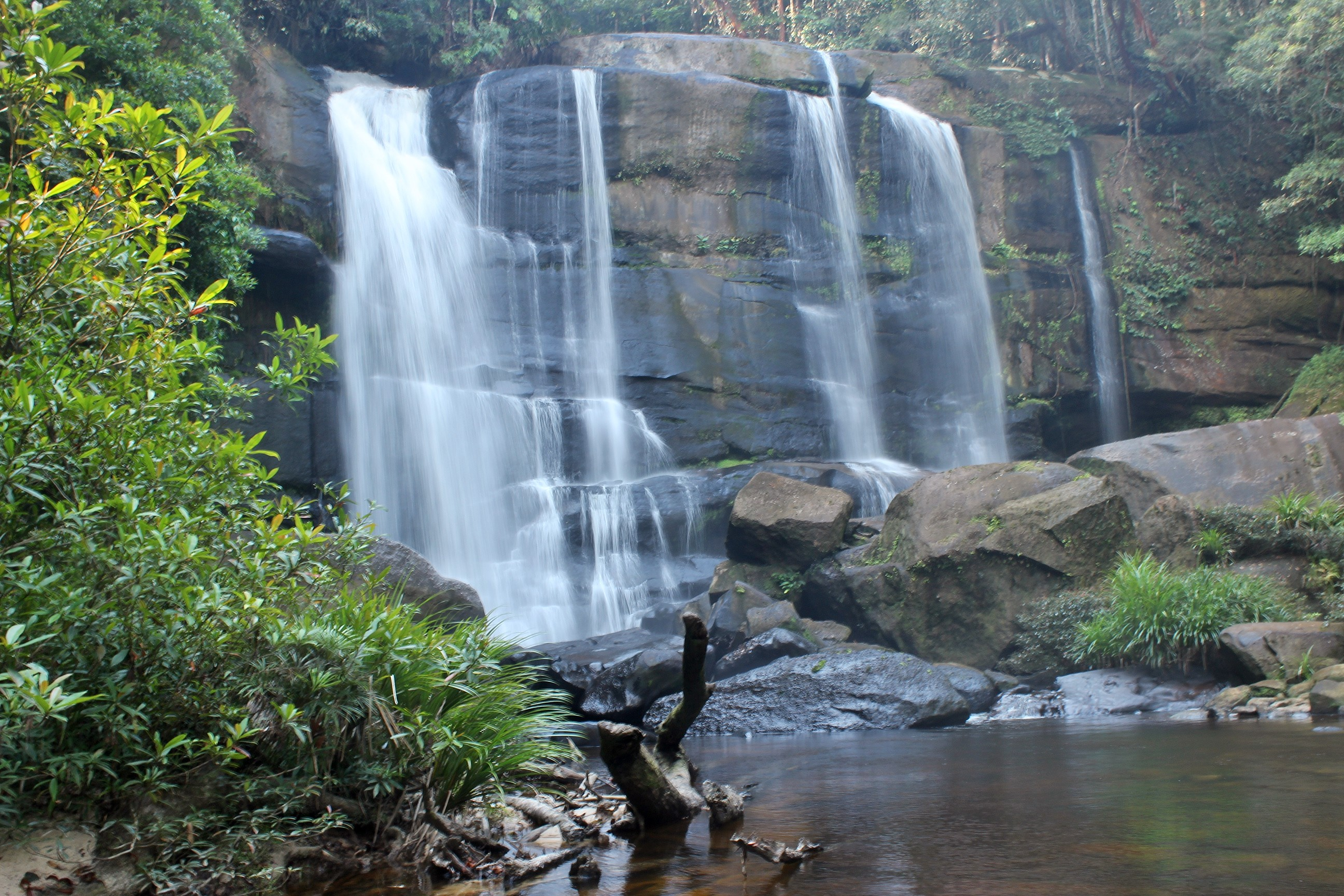
- Rombo Dait Waterfall

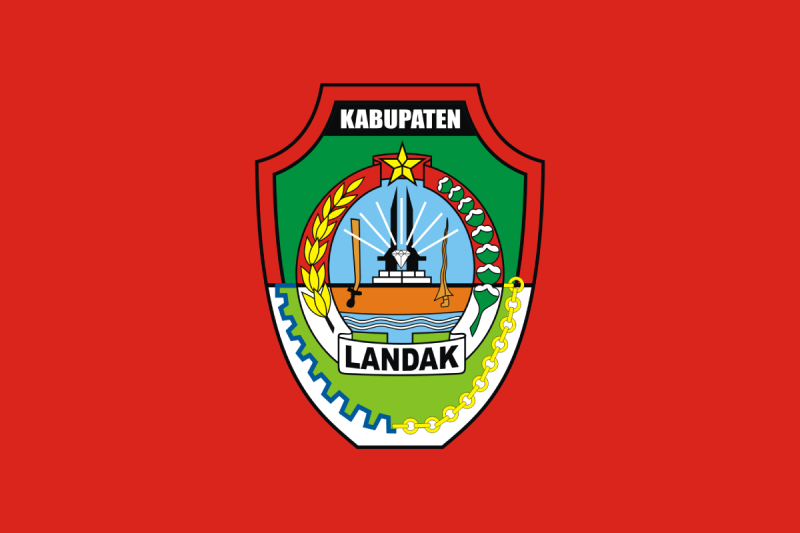
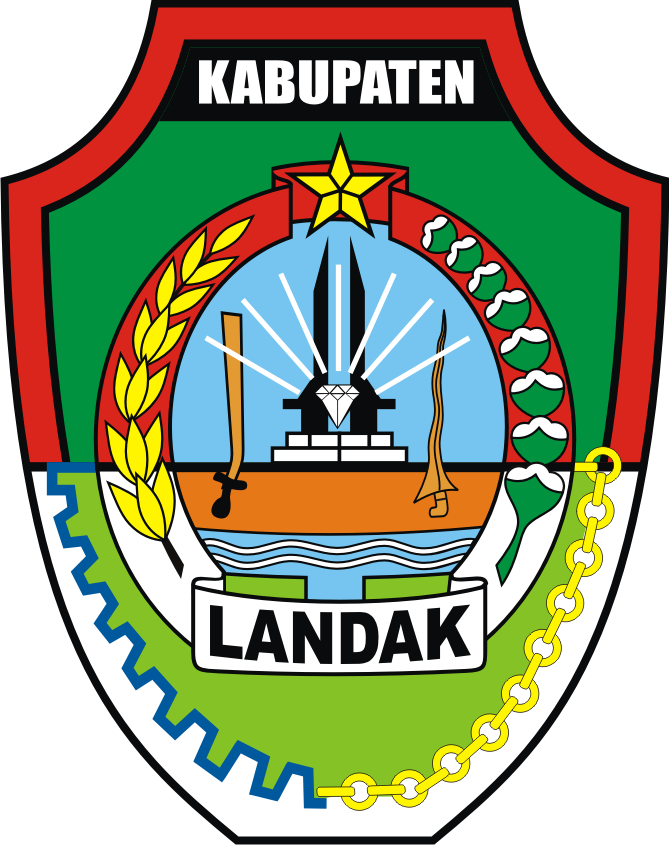
- Flag Coat of arms

- Location within West Kalimantan

- Location in Kalimantan and Indonesia Landak Regency (Indonesia)
- Coordinates: 0.4237°N 109.7592°E
- Country: Indonesia; Sarawak (part of the Borneo States)
- Province: West Kalimantan
- Capital: Ngabang

Government
  - Regent: Karolin Margret Natasa
  - Vice Regent: Erani

Area
  - Total: 9,909.1 km^{2} (3,825.9 sq mi)

Population (mid 2025 estimate)
  - Total: 424,472
  - Density: 42.837/km^{2} (110.95/sq mi)
- Time zone: UTC+7 (IWST)
- Area code: (+62) 563
- Website: landakkab.go.id

Landak Regency is a regency of West Kalimantan province, Indonesia. It was created on 4 October 1999 from the northeastern part of Pontianak Regency. It covers 9,909.10 km^{2} and had a population of 329,649 at the 2010 Census and 397,610 at the 2020 Census; the official estimate as at mid 2025 was 424,472 (comprising 221,612 males and 202,860 females). The principal town lies at Ngabang. Landak is also one of the four regencies in West Kalimantan whose population is predominantly Catholic, the others being Sanggau, Sekadau, and Sintang.

== Administrative districts ==
Landak Regency consists of thirteen districts (kecamatan), tabulated below with their areas and their populations at the 2010 Census and the 2020 Census, together with the official estimates as at mid 2025. The table also includes the locations of the district administrative centres, the number of administrative villages in each district (all classed as rural desa), and its post code.

| Kode Wilayah | Name of District (kecamatan) | Year formed | Area in km^{2} | Pop'n Census 2010 | Pop'n Census 2020 | Pop'n Estimate mid 2025 | Admin centre | No. of villages | Post code |
|---|---|---|---|---|---|---|---|---|---|
| 61.08.10 | Sebangki | 1999 (from Sengah Temila) | 885.60 | 16,653 | 19,582 | 20,642 | Sebangki | 5 | 79358 |
| 61.08.01 | Ngabang | — | 1,148.10 | 60,583 | 78,153 | 86,072 | Amboyo, Ngabang | 19 | 79354 |
| 61.08.11 | Jelimpo | 2006 (from Ngabang) | 848.80 | 23,338 | 28,271 | 30,234 | Jelimpo | 13 | 79357 |
| 61.08.07 | Sengah Temila | — | 1,963.00 | 53,493 | 63,786 | 67,704 | Pahauman | 14 | 79456 |
| 61.08.04 | Mandor | — | 455.10 | 28,387 | 33,452 | 35,290 | Mandor | 17 | 79355 |
| 61.08.03 | Menjalin | — | 322.90 | 18,598 | 21,871 | 23,058 | Menjalin | 8 | 79362 |
| 61.08.02 | Mempawah Hulu (Upper Mempawah) | — | 496.34 | 32,782 | 40,129 | 43,139 | Karangan | 17 | 79363 |
| 61.08.13 | Sompak | 2006 (from Mempawah Hulu) | 219.76 | 13,581 | 15,963 | 16,825 | Sompak | 7 | 79361 |
| 61.08.06 | Menyuke | — | 594.16 | 25,716 | 30,230 | 31,874 | Darit | 16 | 79360 |
| 61.08.12 | Banyuke Hulu (Upper Banyuke) | 2006 (from Menyuke) | 273.80 | 11,864 | 13,669 | 14,267 | Semade | 7 | 79364 |
| 61.08.08 | Meranti | 1996 (from Menyuke) | 372.34 | 9,080 | 10,593 | 11,126 | Meranti | 6 | 79366 |
| 61.08.09 | Kuala Behe | 1999 (from Air Besar) | 968.00 | 13,650 | 16,709 | 17,963 | Kuala Behe | 11 | 79367 |
| 61.08.05 | Air Besar | — | 1,361.20 | 21,924 | 25,202 | 26,278 | Serimbu | 16 | 79365 |
| | Totals | | 9,909.10 | 329,649 | 397,610 | 424,472 | Ngabang | 156 | |

== Climate ==
Ngabang, the seat of the regency has a tropical rainforest climate (Af) with heavy rainfall year-round.

Climate data for Ngabang
| Month | Jan | Feb | Mar | Apr | May | Jun | Jul | Aug | Sep | Oct | Nov | Dec | Year |
|---|---|---|---|---|---|---|---|---|---|---|---|---|---|
| Mean daily maximum °C (°F) | 30.2 (86.4) | 30.7 (87.3) | 31.2 (88.2) | 31.7 (89.1) | 32.0 (89.6) | 31.7 (89.1) | 31.7 (89.1) | 31.7 (89.1) | 31.5 (88.7) | 31.4 (88.5) | 30.9 (87.6) | 30.6 (87.1) | 31.3 (88.3) |
| Daily mean °C (°F) | 26.3 (79.3) | 26.7 (80.1) | 26.9 (80.4) | 27.3 (81.1) | 27.5 (81.5) | 27.2 (81.0) | 27.1 (80.8) | 27.1 (80.8) | 27.0 (80.6) | 27.0 (80.6) | 26.7 (80.1) | 26.6 (79.9) | 27.0 (80.5) |
| Mean daily minimum °C (°F) | 22.4 (72.3) | 22.7 (72.9) | 22.7 (72.9) | 22.9 (73.2) | 23.0 (73.4) | 22.7 (72.9) | 22.5 (72.5) | 22.5 (72.5) | 22.6 (72.7) | 22.7 (72.9) | 22.6 (72.7) | 22.6 (72.7) | 22.7 (72.8) |
| Average rainfall mm (inches) | 279 (11.0) | 237 (9.3) | 233 (9.2) | 288 (11.3) | 239 (9.4) | 193 (7.6) | 173 (6.8) | 196 (7.7) | 246 (9.7) | 304 (12.0) | 313 (12.3) | 314 (12.4) | 3,015 (118.7) |
Source: Climate-Data.org
