= Greater North Borneo languages =

Proposed subgroup of Austronesian languages

Greater North Borneo
- (proposed)
- Geographic distribution: Historically: most of Borneo and Sumatra, western Java and Mainland Southeast Asia Nowadays: Throughout Maritime Southeast Asia
- Linguistic classification: Austronesian: Malayo-Polynesian; Greater North Borneo
- Subdivisions: North Bornean; Central Sarawak; Kayanic; Malayo-Chamic

Language codes
- Glottolog: nort3253 partial match

The Greater North Borneo languages are a proposed subgroup of the Austronesian language family. The subgroup historically covers languages that are spoken throughout much of Borneo (excluding the areas where the Greater Barito and Tamanic languages are spoken) and Sumatra, as well as parts of Java, and Mainland Southeast Asia. The Greater North Borneo hypothesis was first proposed by Robert Blust (2010) and further elaborated by Alexander Smith (2017a, 2017b). The evidence presented for this proposal are solely lexical. Despite its name, this branch has been now widespread within the Maritime Southeast Asia region, with the exception of the Philippines (although this depends on the classification of Molbog).

The proposed subgroup covers some of the major languages in Southeast Asia, including Malay/Indonesian and related Malayic languages such as Minangkabau, Banjar and Iban; as well as Sundanese and Acehnese. In Borneo itself, the largest non-Malayic GNB language in terms of the number of speakers is Central Dusun, mainly spoken in Sabah.

Since Greater North Borneo also includes the Malayic, Chamic, and Sundanese languages, it is incompatible with Alexander Adelaar's Malayo-Sumbawan hypothesis. However, in 2023, Alexander D. Smith reinterpreted the branch as a "zone of lexical diffusion" rather than a proper linguistic branch.

== History ==
Blust connects the GNB expansion with the migration of Austronesian speakers into Maritime Southeast Asia. According to Blust, when Austronesian speakers came from the north through the Philippines, they split into three groups: one that went into Borneo, one that went into Sulawesi, and one that went into the Moluccas. After landing in Borneo, the first group was further split into two: one that moved along the northwestern coast facing the South China Sea, and another one that moved along the eastern coast. The language variety spoken by the northwestern group eventually developed into the Greater North Borneo languages.

== Classification ==
=== Blust (2010) ===
Robert Blust proposed a set of lexical innovations that defined Greater North Borneo. One of these innovations is *tuzuq replacing Proto-Malayo-Polynesian *pitu for 'seven'. The following subgroups are included:

- **Greater North Borneo**
  - North Borneo
    - Northeast Sabah
    - Southwest Sabah
    - North Sarawak
  - Kayanic
    - Kayan-Murik-Merap
    - Segai-Modang
  - Land Dayak
    - Banyadu-Bekati
    - Bidayuh-Southern Land Dayak
  - Malayo-Chamic
    - Malayic
    - Chamic
  - Sundanese
  - Rejang
  - Moken

While Blust assumed that all languages of Borneo other than those in Greater Barito subgroup with GNB, he does not attempt to explicitly classify several languages, including those with insufficient available data.

- (unclassified)
  - Melanau
  - Kajang

=== Smith (2017a, 2017b) ===
Smith recognizes an independent Central Sarawak branch within Greater North Borneo, combining the Melanau, Kajang and Punan–Müller-Schwaner languages. Additionally, he also excludes Moklenic from GNB and places it all the way up as one of the primary branches of Malayo-Polynesian.

- **Greater North Borneo**
  - North Borneo
    - Northeast Sabah
    - Southwest Sabah
    - North Sarawak
  - Central Sarawak
    - Melanau
    - Kajang
    - Punan–Müller-Schwaner
  - Kayanic
    - Kayan-Murik-Merap
    - Segai-Modang
  - Land Dayak
    - Banyadu-Bekati
    - Bidayuh-Southern Land Dayak
  - Malayo-Chamic
    - Malayic
    - Chamic
  - Sundanese
  - Rejang

Proto-Kayanic, Proto-Punan, Proto-Müller-Schwaner, Proto-Land Dayak, and Proto-Kenyah have also been reconstructed in Smith (2017a).

=== Smith (2023) ===
Smith reinterprets the Greater North Borneo branch as a "zone of lexical diffusion", considering its lexical innovations are sparsely attested among the languages. He also removes 8 reconstructed words, attributed to borrowing from other languages such as Malay, leaving only 22 reconstructions (and 4 of them are weak).

- Malayo-Polynesian
  - **Northeast Sabahan**
  - **Northwest Sabahan**
  - **North Sarawakan**
  - **Kayanic**
  - **Central Sarawak**
  - **Malayic**
  - Land Dayak
  - Barito–Basap linkage

Bold denotes the inclusion within GNB lexical diffusion. According to the source, the Land Dayak languages are removed from the branch.

== Austroasiatic influence ==
According to Roger Blench (2010), Austroasiatic languages were once spoken in Borneo. Blench cites Austroasiatic-origin vocabulary words in modern-day Bornean branches such as Land Dayak (Bidayuh, Dayak Bakatiq, etc.), Dusunic (Central Dusun, Bisaya, etc.), Kayan, and Kenyah, noting especially resemblances with the Aslian languages of peninsular Malaysia. As further evidence for his proposal, Blench also cites ethnographic evidence such as musical instruments in Borneo shared in common with Austroasiatic-speaking groups in mainland Southeast Asia.

Blench (2010) claims that lexical forms shared among Bornean and Austroasiatic languages include 'rain', 'to die', 'back (of body)', 'flying lemur', 'monkey', 'barking deer', 'lizard', and 'taro'.

Kaufman (2018) presents further evidence of words in various Austronesian languages of Borneo that are of likely Austroasiatic origin.

== See also ==
- Languages of Kalimantan (Indonesian Borneo)
- Languages of Indonesia
