= Keninjal language =

Malayic language spoken on Borneo

Keninjal
- Native to: Indonesia
- Region: Borneo
- Native speakers: 32,000 (2007)
- Language family: Austronesian: Malayo-Polynesian; Malayic; Ibanic?; Keninjal

Language codes
- ISO 639-3: knl
- Glottolog: keni1248

Keninjal (Dayak Kaninjal) is a Malayic Dayak language of Borneo. Glottolog once classified Keninjal as a Western Malayic Dayak language alongside Kendayan, but Smith (2017) includes it in the Ibanic branch of Malayic based on phonological evidence.
