= Sanggau Regency =

Regency in West Kalimantan, Indonesia

Sanggau Regency Kabupaten Sanggau
- Regency
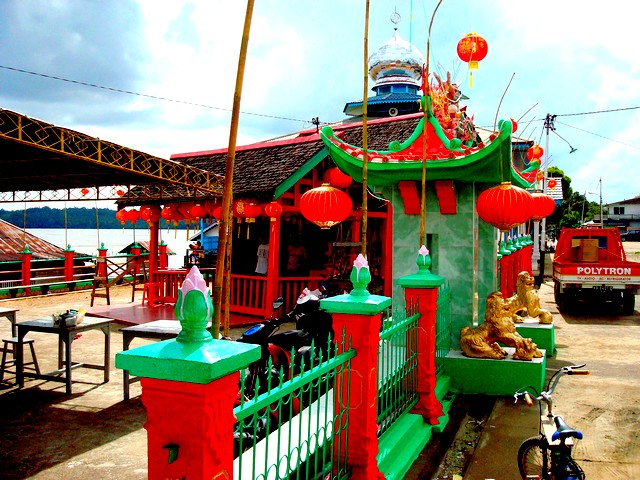
- Toah Pek Kong Temple, Sanggau

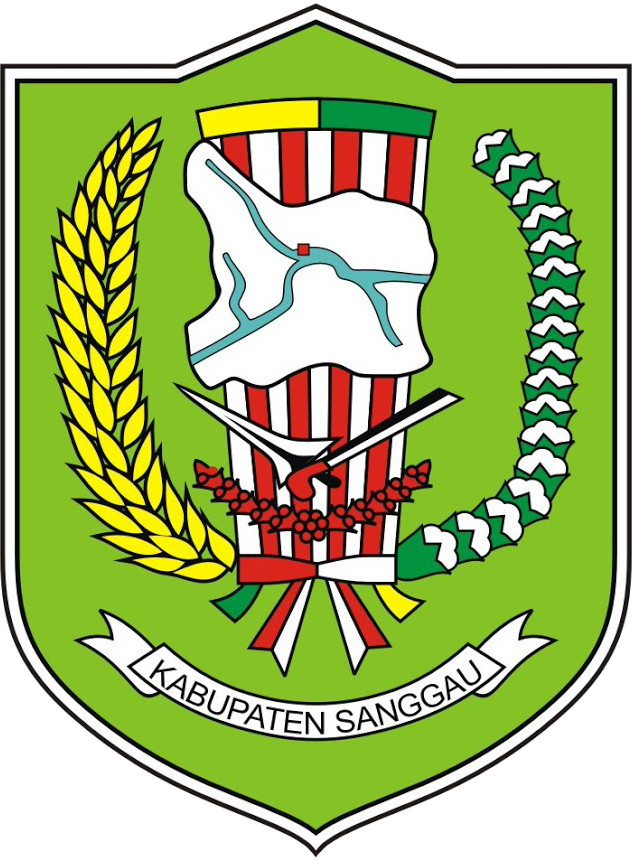
- Coat of arms
- Motto: Sanggau Permai
- Location within West Kalimantan

- Location in Kalimantan and Indonesia Sanggau Regency (Indonesia)
- Coordinates: 0°07′10″N 110°35′20″E
- Country: Indonesia; Sarawak (part of the Borneo States)
- Province: West Kalimantan
- Regency seat: Sanggau

Government
  - Regent: Yohanes Ontot
  - Vice Regent: Susana Herpena

Area
  - Total: 12,452.22 km^{2} (4,807.83 sq mi)

Population (mid 2025 estimate)
  - Total: 516,710
  - Density: 41.495/km^{2} (107.47/sq mi)
- Time zone: UTC+7 (WIB)
- Area code: (+62) 564
- HDI (2019): ▲0.657 (Medium)
- Website: sanggau.go.id

Sanggau Regency (Chinese: 桑高/上侯; Hakka: Sîang-ngau) is a regency in the north-central section of West Kalimantan province of Indonesia. On 18 December 2003, the regency's eastern portion was split off to create a new regency called Sekadau, leaving Sanggau with an area of 12,452.22 km^{2} (4,807.83 sq mi). As of the 2020 census, Sanggau Regency had a population of 484,836; the official estimate as at mid 2025 was 516,710 (comprising 267,262 males and 249,448 females). Alongside the Landak, Sekadau, and Sintang regencies, it is one of four West Kalimantan regencies with a predominantly Catholic populations.

== History ==
=== Etymology ===
Local legend says the name came from that of a plant that grows around the Sekayan River, where the Sanggau Kingdom was founded in the 4th century.

=== Early history ===
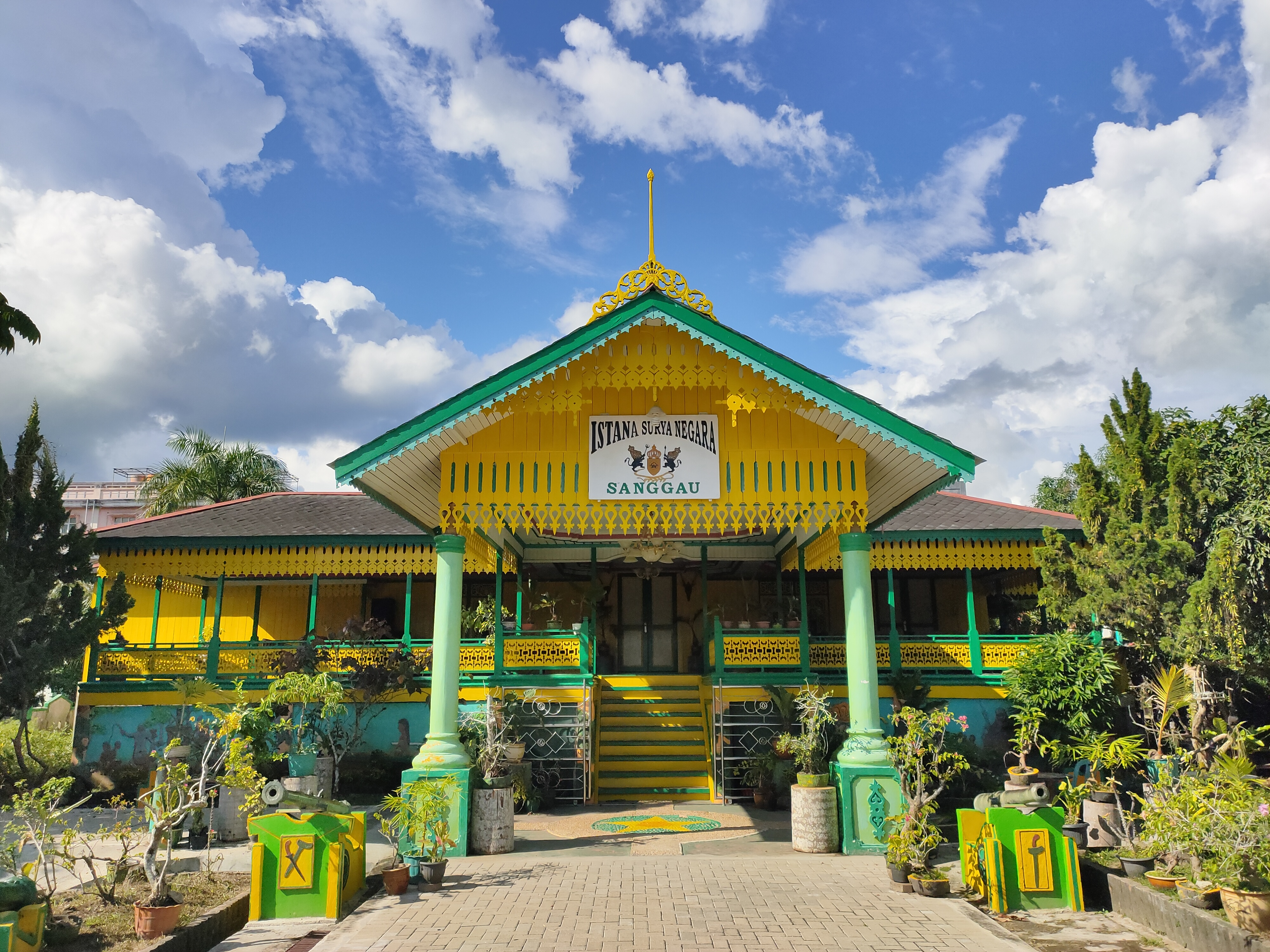
Surya Negara Palace of Sanggau Sultanate

The Kingdom of Sanggau is thought to have been founded on 7 April 1310, which is now commemorated as the anniversary of the founding of Sanggau town, where the regency seat is located. The kingdom was led by the princess Dara Nante, who abdicated and gave the throne to her personal assistant Dakkudak. Dakkudak, who proved to be an incompetent ruler, was unable to lead the kingdom's administration. He fled the kingdom in secret, abandoning the throne and leaving the kingdom paralyzed.^{:171}

After Dakkudak's flight, the state of the kingdom is unclear until 1485, when one of Dara Nante's relatives, a princess named Dayang Mas Ratna took the throne. She moved the kingdom's capital from Labai Lawai to Mengkiang, which is close to the Sekayam river. During this time, she married Nurul Kamal, a Muslim from the Banten Sultanate. It is unclear whether Sanggau has adopted Islam at this point.^{:172} Ratna's successor was a princess named Dayang Puasa, who was related to the royal family of the neighbouring Sintang Kingdom.^{:32} During Puasa's reign, Sanggau and Sintang maintained good relations, and she consolidated power within the realm.^{:32}

Puasa's successor was a king named Abang Gani, the kingdom's first male ruler. During his reign, Sanggau was involved in a conflict with the Matan Kingdom, which was also known as the Tanjungpura Kingdom. The conflict started when Gani's daughter Dayang Seri Gemala married a noble from the Matan royal family. Gemala's husband was unfaithful to her and married again, insulting the Sanggau royal family. Gemala was brought back to Sanggau not long after.^{:172} Following Gani, every ruler of Sanggau was male.^{:97} Gani's reign ended in 1614 and in 1658. Bungsu changed his name to Sultan Mohammad Jamaluddin Kusumanegara. During Jamaluddin's reign, Sanggau moved its capital to its current location, Sanggau town. During this time, Sanggau formed ties with the Cirebon Sultanate in Java.^{:173}

=== 19th century ===
Mohammad Tahir II ruled Sanggau from 1860 to 1876. Tahir II made an agreement that settled the border between Sanggau and Brunei Sultanate, which later defined the modern Indonesia–Malaysia border.^{:175} During Tahir II's reign, Sanggau made its first contact with the Dutch Empire. Tahir II welcomed the Dutch in the kingdom's capital and allowed them to build an outpost in Sanggau.^{:175}

Tahir II died in 1876 and was succeeded by Sultan Sulaiman Paku Negara. The era after Tahir II is defined by the start of Dutch control over the region. In 1877, the sultan of Sanggau and the governor-general of the Dutch East Indies, Johan Wilhelm van Lansberge, signed a treaty leasing land to the Dutch East Indies. in 1921, the Dutch forced Sultan Muhammaid Said Pakunegara to step down and he was replaced by Sultan Tahir III.

=== 20th century ===
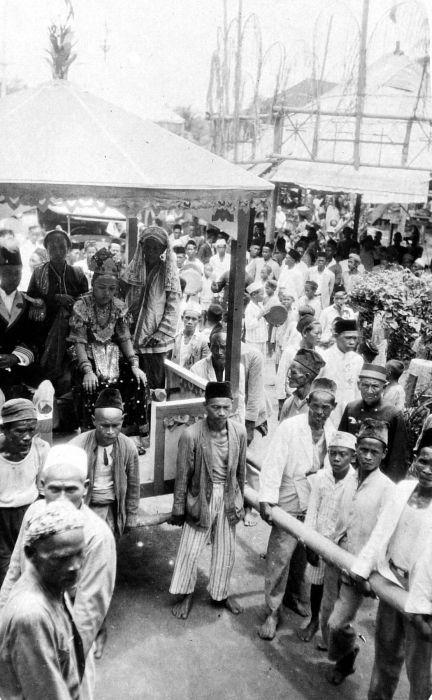
Marriage ceremony of Sanggau noble, presumably before 1943

In 1942, Japan occupied the Dutch East Indies. During that time, the reigning sultan of Sanggau was Sultan Muhammad Arif Pakunegara. His reign only lasted for a year; he was killed by Japanese forces and replaced by pro-Japanese Sultan Marhabah Saleh.^{:98} Marhabah Saleh was succeeded by Gusti Ali Akbar. The region also underwent conflict between natives and Japanese forces over forced labour, known as the Dayak Desa War. The town Meliau in Sanggau was captured briefly by Dayaks and revolting labourers but the Japanese recaptured it on 31 August 1945.

After the Japanese surrendered, the region was left in a power vacuum. Ali Akbar was supportive of the establishment of an Indonesian republic and the returning Dutch staged a coup against him using troops under the command of a Dutchman named Riekerk. Ali Akbar was replaced by Muhammad Taufik Surya Negara,^{:177} whose reign lasted until the abolishment of swapraja (autonomous royal regions) under the newly recognized Indonesian Republic on 2 May 1960, ending the existence of the sultanate.

=== Recent history ===
After fall of Suharto and the rapid decentralization that followed, on 18 December 2003 Sanggau Regency was split to create a new Sekadau Regency, reducing its size. On 26 July 2006, Sanggau Sultanate was revived by cultural figures with the assistance of local government, nearly 49 years after its abolition. The sultanate was only intended for symbolic and cultural purposes, and no longer held political power. The revival ceremony was attended by several other Indonesian ceremonial monarchs such as sultan of Palembang, as well as local politicians.

== Geography ==
Sanggau Regency borders Sintang and Sekadau Regencies in the east, Malaysia in the north, Ketapang Regency in the south, and Landak Regency in the west. Sanggau Regency is located in the interior of Borneo, and is divided by the Kapuas River, which is one of the longest rivers in Indonesia. Its topography is dominated by wetlands and swamps, which are generally low-lying. The regency's soil formation is dominated by podzol, which covers around 44% of the regency's area. In Toba and Meliau District, latosol soil can be found.

=== Climate ===
Sanggau has a tropical rainforest climate with heavy to very heavy rainfall year-round. The wettest months generally are November and December with average rainfall on as many as 20 days while the driest is usually August with average of 5 days rainfall. The regency's highest annual rainfall is also during November, which is around 416 mm (16.4 in) and the lowest is during August which may be as low as 60 mm (2.4 in).

Climate data for Sanggau
Month	Jan	Feb	Mar	Apr	May	Jun	Jul	Aug	Sep	Oct	Nov	Dec	Year
Mean daily maximum °C (°F)	29.3 (84.7)	29.6 (85.3)	30.5 (86.9)	31.0 (87.8)	31.6 (88.9)	31.1 (88.0)	31.1 (88.0)	31.0 (87.8)	30.8 (87.4)	31.0 (87.8)	30.6 (87.1)	30.1 (86.2)	30.6 (87.2)
Daily mean °C (°F)	25.6 (78.1)	25.9 (78.6)	26.3 (79.3)	26.7 (80.1)	27.1 (80.8)	26.6 (79.9)	26.6 (79.9)	26.6 (79.9)	26.5 (79.7)	26.7 (80.1)	26.4 (79.5)	26.1 (79.0)	26.4 (79.6)
Mean daily minimum °C (°F)	22.0 (71.6)	22.2 (72.0)	22.2 (72.0)	22.4 (72.3)	22.6 (72.7)	22.2 (72.0)	22.1 (71.8)	22.2 (72.0)	22.3 (72.1)	22.5 (72.5)	22.3 (72.1)	22.2 (72.0)	22.3 (72.1)
Average rainfall mm (inches)	398 (15.7)	324 (12.8)	250 (9.8)	271 (10.7)	225 (8.9)	141 (5.6)	162 (6.4)	192 (7.6)	199 (7.8)	282 (11.1)	324 (12.8)	339 (13.3)	3,107 (122.5)
Source: Climate-Data.org

== Governance ==
=== Administrative districts ===
Sanggau Regency consists of fifteen districts (kecamatan). The areas and populations as of the 2010 and 2020 censuses are given below, together with the official estimates as at mid 2025. The table also includes the locations of the district administrative centres, the number of administrative villages in each district (totaling 163 rural desa and 6 urban kelurahan - the latter all in Kapuas District), and its post code.

Kode Wilayah	Name of District (kecamatan)	Area in km^{2}	Pop'n 2010 census	Pop'n 2020 census	Pop'n mid 2025 estimate	Admin centre	No. of villages	Post code
61.03.13	Toba	1,133.28	11,954	15,829	17,760	Teraju	7	78572
61.03.20	Meliau	1,350,36	46,150	50,408	51,525	Meliau Hilir	17	78571
61.03.01	Kapuas	1,360.86	78,768	88,308	91,410	Sanggau	26	78511: 78516
61.03.02	Mukok	498.04	18,256	21,240	22,384	Kedukul	9	78581
61.03.04	Jangkang	1,527.07	26,674	29,010	29,591	Balui Sebut	11	78591
61.03.05	Bonti	767.18	20,281	23,288	24,387	Bonti	9	78552
61.03.09	Parindu	774.25	32,426	38,993	41,756	Pusat Damai	14	78561
61.03.11	Tayan Hilir (Lower Tayan)	973.11	29,990	36,710	39,650	Kawat	15	78464
61.03.12	Balai	461.22	22,279	28,891	32,089	Batang Tarang	12	78563
61.03.10	Tayan Hulu (Upper Tayan)	705.38	31,080	38,169	41,292	Sosok	11	78562
61.03.08	Kembayan	610.81	25,796	31,776	34,426	Tanjung Merpati	11	78553
61.03.06	Beduai (Beduwai)	441.39	10,744	13,032	14,014	Bereng Berkawat	5	78555
61.03.03	Noyan	478.39	9,873	11,674	12,400	Noyan	5	78554
61.03.07	Sekayam	780.24	29,639	39,811	44,976	Balai Karangan	10	78556
61.03.21	Entikong	594.66	14,558	17,697	19,050	Entikong	5	78557
	Totals	12,452.22	408,468	484,836	516,710	Sanggau	169	

=== Local government ===
Sanggau is a second-level administrative division that is equivalent to a city. As a regency, it is headed by a democratically elected regent. The heads of districts are directly appointed by the regent with the recommendation of the regency secretary. Executive power lies with the regent and vice regent, and legislative function is exercised by the regency's parliament.

=== Politics ===
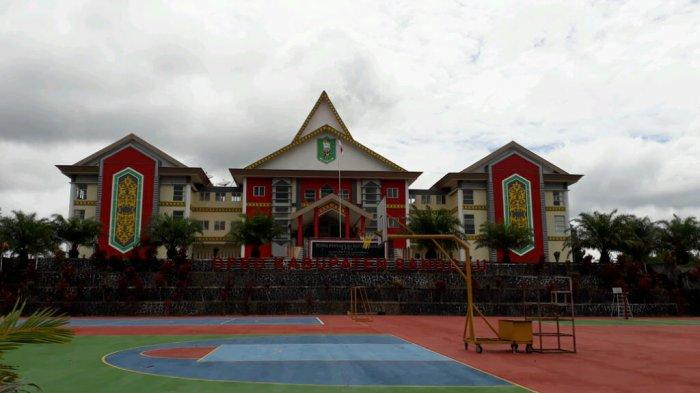
Parliament building of Sanggau Regency

On the provincial level, Sanggau Regency is part of the 6th West Kalimantan electoral district, along with Sekadau Regency; together they send eight out of 65 representatives to the local parliament. The regency is divided into five electoral districts and has 40 representatives. The last election was in 2024.

Electoral district	Administrative districts (kecamatan)	Representatives
1st Sanggau	Kapuas District	7
2nd Sanggau	Meliau, Tayan Hilir, and Toba Districts	9
3rd Sanggau	Balai, Parindu, and Tayan Hulu Districts	9
4th Sanggau	Beduai, Entikong, Kembayan, Noyan, and Sekayam Districts	9
5th Sanggau	Bonti, Jangkang, and Mukok Districts	6
Total		40

== Economy ==
The biggest economic sectors in Sanggau are agriculture and manufacturing. Agriculture consist of 32.10% of regency's gross regional product (GRP) in 2020 while manufacture consist of 17.33%. Other significant sectors are retail and trade with 10.35% of regency's GRP, mining with 10.96%, and construction with 6.44%. The fastest growing sector was healthcare sector with an increase of 17.87% in 2020, followed by electricity and gas with an increase of 14.92%. The regency's workforce is dominated by agriculture, which employs more than 60% of the regency's working population. The regency main agricultural products are rubber, palm oil, and pepper. Other than that, the regency has a significant aquaculture sector, which produces 8,154 tons of freshwater fish in 2020. There are 75 active village cooperatives and 342 non-village cooperatives in Sanggau as of 2020.

Economic growth was 3.89% in 2019 but decreased to 0.70% in 2020 due to the COVID-19 pandemic and restrictions that were implemented. The unemployment rate was 3.52% and the poverty rate was 4.46%.

== Demographics ==
Sannggau had a population of 408,468 at the 2010 census, 444,095 at the 2015 census and 484,836 as of the 2020 census. The regency experienced a population growth of 2.89% in 2020. The official estimate as at mid 2025 was 516,710. The most densely populated district were Balai District with 81 people per km^{2} and Parindu District with 69 people per km^{2}, while the least densely populated was Toba District with 16 people per km^{2}. Kapuas District, where the town of Sangga, the regency seat, is located, has a population of over 90,000 people, making it the most populated district in the regency. The regency's sex ratio was 107.1, meaning there were 107.1 males for each 100 females. Sekayam District is the fastest growing district with an annual population growth of 3.25% between 2020 and 2025, followed by Toba District with 3.07%, while the slowest growing districts are Jangkang and Meliau.

As with most Indonesian regions, the population is relatively young and the workforce is dominated by youths above 15 years old. In 2020, 241,987 of the regency's population are classified as part of the workforce. The 20-to-24 age group is the most populous age group in the regency in 2020. According to 2013 data, the literacy rate was 92.01%, which is lower than that of neighbouring regions.

The regency's population is predominantly Roman Catholic, consisting of 326,648 people in 2022. The second-largest religion is Islam with 170,052 people; this is followed by Protestantism with 59,380 people and Buddhism with 7,405 people. Many of the regency's people speak the local Sanggau language (a Land Dayak language).

== Infrastructure ==
=== Education ===
Sanggau Regency has 457 elementary schools, 122 junior higschools, 29 senior highschools, and 18 vocational highscools (SMK). There are 64 kindergartens in the regency.

There are several higher education institutions in Sanggau. Melawi Teaching and Education College has a campus branch located close to the Malaysian border in Entikong that offers a bachelor's degree in teaching-related majors such as mathematic education and elementary school teaching. Abditama Sanggau Agriculture and Plantation Academy is located close to Sanggau town. Other institutions include Sanggau Agrobusiness Management Academy, Belitang Polytech, and the state-owned Pontianak State Polytech also has campus in Sanggau. The regency government has expressed interest in establishing its own state-owned polytechnic.

The regency has one public library, which is managed by the regency government. In 2019, the old library building was demolished to make way for a new building. The new building was inaugurated in 2021.

=== Healthcare ===
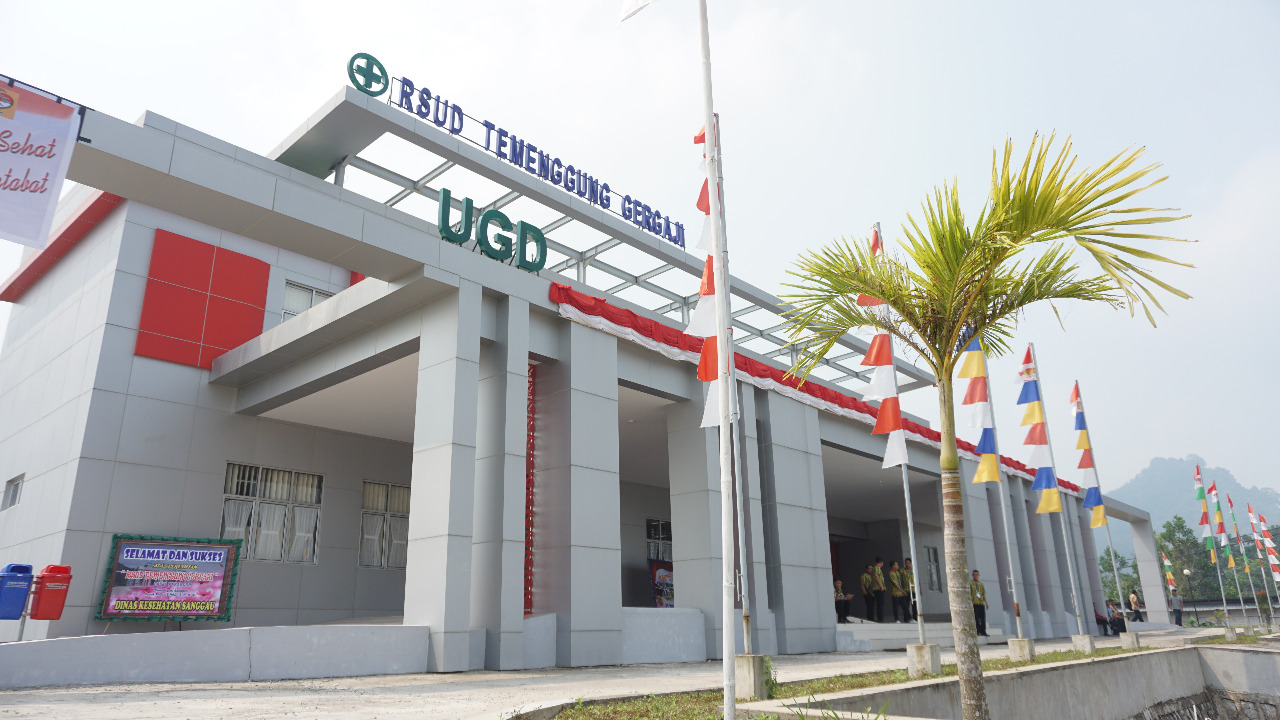
Tumenggung Gergaji Regional Hospital in Sekayam District

The regency has five hospitals including one maternity hospital, seven polyclinics, 89 puskesmas, 10 registered pharmacies, and over 640 healthcare centres. From 89 puskesmas, 18 are open 24 hours and accept inpatient care. The regency's main hospital is Mozes Thadeus Djaman Regional Hospital, which is located in Sanggau town. It is a public hospital owned by the regency government. Indonesia's Ministry of Health classifies it as a C-class hospital.

The regency's other major hospital is the D-class Sentra Medika General Hospital, which is also located in Sanggau town. Other hospitals are located in Tayan Hulu and Sekayam Districts.

Owing to demand for PCR sample tests during the COVID-19 pandemic, which would previously need to be sent to Pontianak, the regency built a separate laboratory for PCR test in 2021.

=== Transport and communications ===
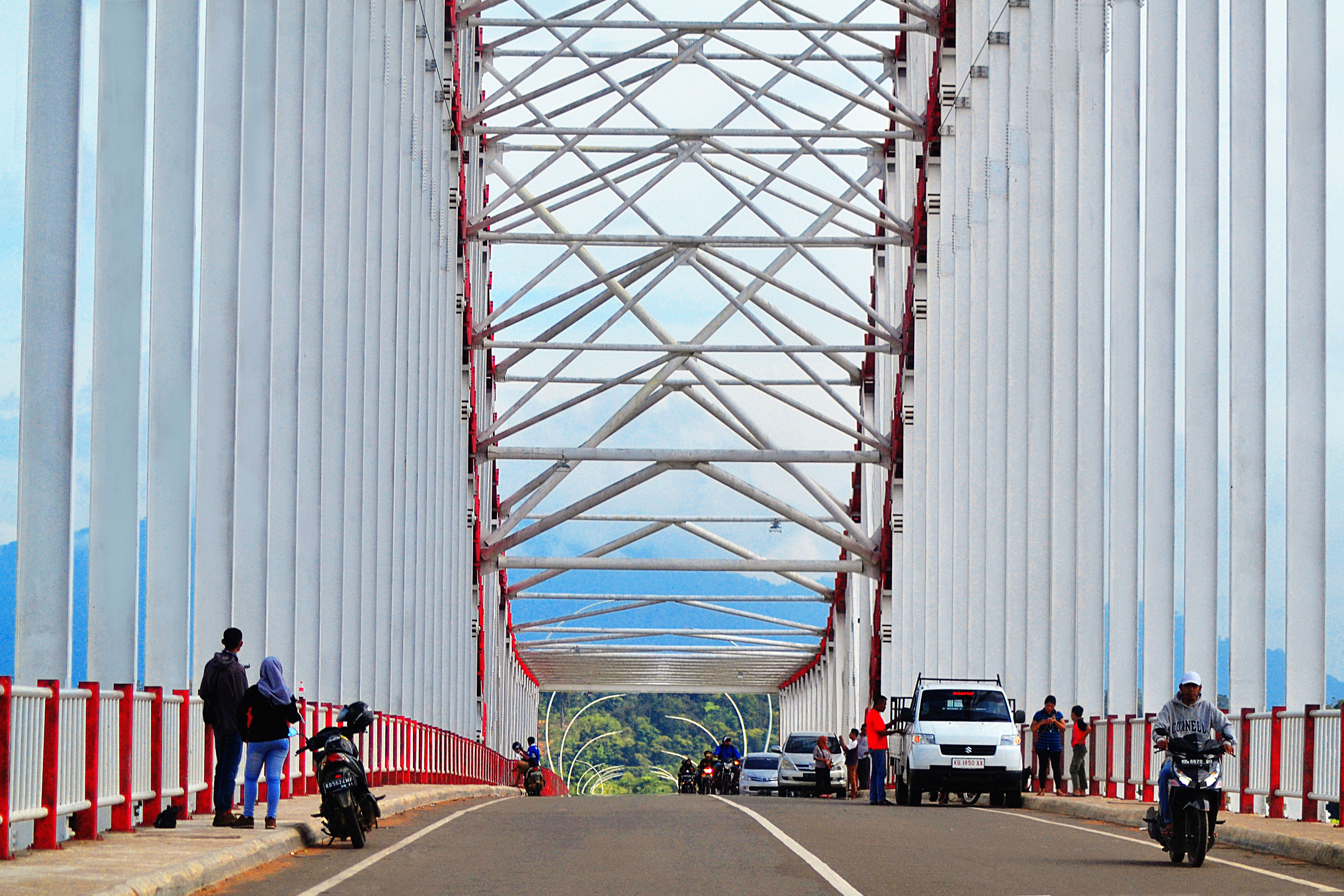
Tayan Bridge across Kapuas River, Sanggau

The regency has 1,001.14 km (622.08 miles) of roads, of which 294 km (183 miles) have not yet been paved. All roads in the regency are maintained by the regency government. The regency has 15 post offices, which are run by the state-owned Pos Indonesia. Being landlocked, the regency has no port; there is no public airport and travel is mostly by land. The closest airport is Tebelian Airport, which is located in Sintang Regency.

Perum DAMRI operates regular bus services between Pontianak and Sanggau. Online ride-hailing services have also established presences in the regency, mostly in Sanggau town.

The regency has access to 4G internet services as well as fibre-optic service provided by Indihome under the state-owned telco Telkomsel. Sanggau town also has several Wi-Fi hotspots, which were initiated by local government.

=== Others ===
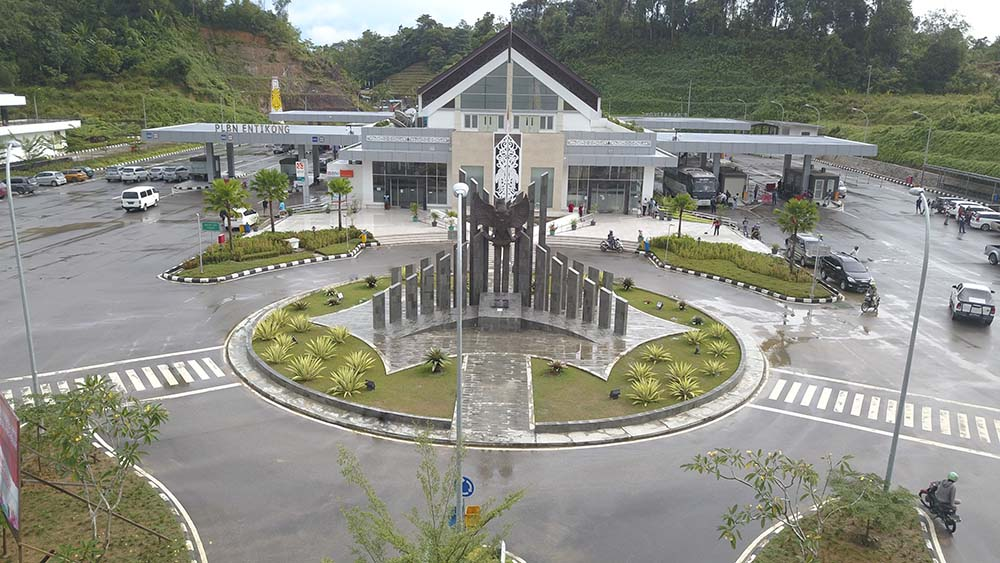
Entikong integrated border post (PLBN)

In 2020, there are 337 mosques, 265 Protestant churches, 556 Catholic churches, two Hindu temples, and three Chinese Buddhist temples (Vihara) in the regency. There is an integrated border-crossing post in Entikong that has quarantine, clinic, and immigration facilities. It was renovated in 2016 and has since become a tourist attraction.

Sanggau town has several public parks such as Sanggau Permai Park, Kehati Green Park, and Sabang Merah Park. A stadium named Indoor Bujang Malaka Sport Complex is also located in Sanggau town. Convenience store chains such as Indomaret have established a presence in Sanggau town.

== See also ==
- Roman Catholic Diocese of Sanggau
