= Bakatiʼ language =

Austronesian language spoken in Kalimantan, Indonesia

Bekatiʼ
- Native to: Indonesia
- Region: Kalimantan
- Native speakers: (4,000 cited 1986)
- Language family: Austronesian: Malayo-Polynesian; Land Dayak; Bekatiʼ languages; Bekatiʼ

Language codes
- ISO 639-3: bei
- Glottolog: beka1241

Yulius speaking Bakati', also called Bekati

Bekatiʼ (Bekatiq, Bakati) is a Dayak language of Borneo.
