= Sekadau Regency =

Sekadau Regency Kabupaten Sekadau
- Regency
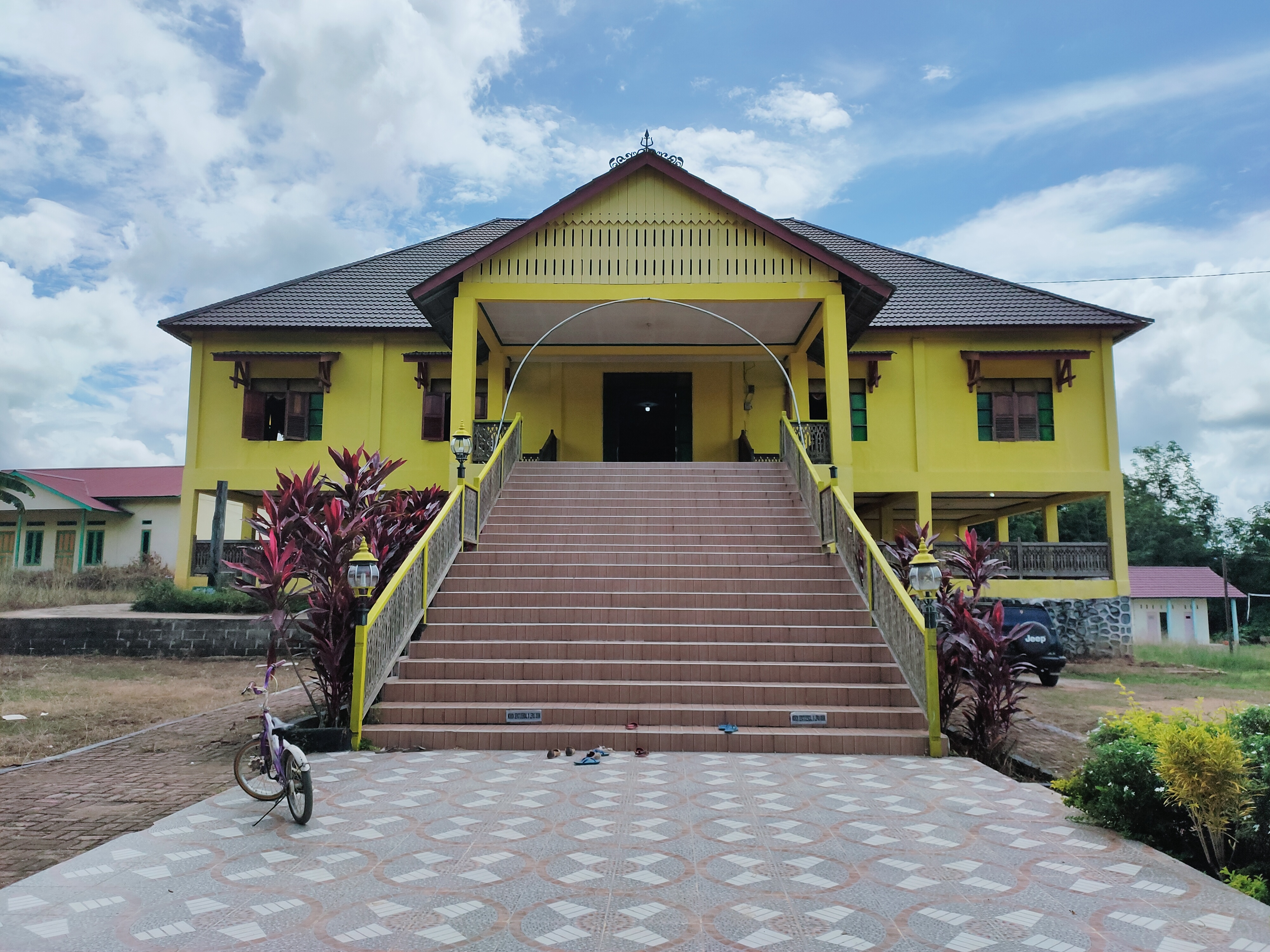
- Palace of the former Sekadau kingdom

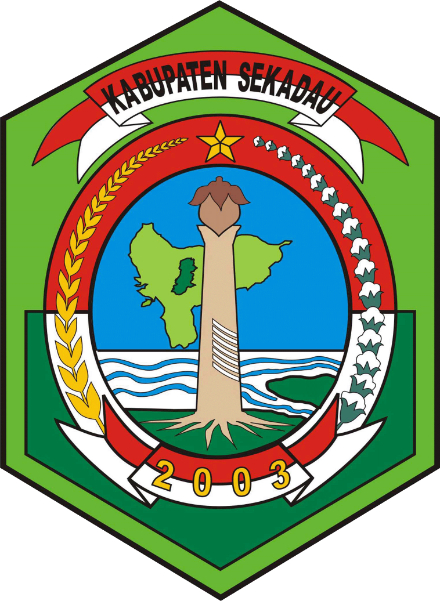
- Coat of arms

- Location within West Kalimantan

- Location in Kalimantan and Indonesia Sekadau Regency (Indonesia)
- Coordinates: 0.0348°N 110.9507°E
- Country: Indonesia
- Province: West Kalimantan
- Regency seat: Sekadau

Government
  - Regent: Aron
  - Vice Regent: Subandrio

Area
  - Total: 5,642.75 km^{2} (2,178.68 sq mi)

Population (mid 2024 estimate)
  - Total: 222,510
  - Density: 39.433/km^{2} (102.13/sq mi)
- Time zone: UTC+7 (IWST)
- Area code: (+62) 564
- Website: sekadaukab.go.id

Sekadau Regency is a regency of West Kalimantan province of Indonesia. It was created on 18 December 2003 from the eastern part of Sanggau Regency. It covers an area of 5,642.75 km^{2}, and had a population of 181,634 at the 2010 Census and 211,559 at the 2020 Census; the official estimate as at mid 2024 was 222,510 (comprising 115,200 males and 107,310 females). The regency seat lies at the town of Sekadau in Sekadau Hilir District.

== Geography ==
=== Climate ===
Sekadau has a tropical rainforest climate (Af) with heavy to very heavy rainfall year-round.

Climate data for Sekadau
Month	Jan	Feb	Mar	Apr	May	Jun	Jul	Aug	Sep	Oct	Nov	Dec	Year
Mean daily maximum °C (°F)	30.3 (86.5)	30.6 (87.1)	31.3 (88.3)	31.8 (89.2)	32.1 (89.8)	31.8 (89.2)	31.9 (89.4)	31.9 (89.4)	31.8 (89.2)	31.6 (88.9)	31.0 (87.8)	30.7 (87.3)	31.4 (88.5)
Daily mean °C (°F)	26.4 (79.5)	26.5 (79.7)	27.0 (80.6)	27.3 (81.1)	27.6 (81.7)	27.2 (81.0)	27.1 (80.8)	27.1 (80.8)	27.2 (81.0)	27.1 (80.8)	26.7 (80.1)	26.5 (79.7)	27.0 (80.6)
Mean daily minimum °C (°F)	22.5 (72.5)	22.5 (72.5)	22.7 (72.9)	22.9 (73.2)	23.1 (73.6)	22.6 (72.7)	22.3 (72.1)	22.3 (72.1)	22.6 (72.7)	22.6 (72.7)	22.5 (72.5)	22.5 (72.5)	22.6 (72.7)
Average rainfall mm (inches)	311 (12.2)	287 (11.3)	275 (10.8)	278 (10.9)	232 (9.1)	183 (7.2)	156 (6.1)	167 (6.6)	230 (9.1)	314 (12.4)	338 (13.3)	268 (10.6)	3,039 (119.6)
Source: Climate-Data.org

== Governance ==
=== Administrative districts ===
Sekadau Regency consists of seven districts (kecamatan), tabulated below with their areas and their populations at the 2010 Census and the 2020 Census, together with the official estimates as at mid 2024. The table also includes the locations of the district administrative centres, the number of villages (all classed as rural desa) in each district, and its post code.

Kode Wilayah	Name of District (kecamatan)	Area in km^{2}	Pop'n 2010 Census	Pop'n 2020 Census	Pop'n mid 2024 Estimate	Admin centre	No. of villages	Post code
61.09.04	Nanga Mahap	508.03	24,680	27,411	28,294	Nanga Mahap	13	79585
61.09.03	Nanga Taman	1,274.28	25,218	27,916	28,778	Nanga Taman	13	79584
61.09.02	Sekadau Hulu (Upper Sekadau)	853.02	24,968	29,685	31,460	Rawak	15	79583
61.09.01	Sekadau Hilir (Lower Sekadau)	911.27	55,897	67,659	72,204	Sekadau	17	78511 - 79516, 79582
61.09.05	Belitang Hilir (Lower Belitang)	764.34	20,687	24,248	25,557	Sungai Ayak	9	79586
61.09.07	Belitang	178.53	11,531	13,634	14,418	Nanga Belitang	7	79588
61.09.06	Belitang Hulu (Upper Belitang)	1,153.29	18,653	21,006	21,799	Balai Sepuak	13	79587
	Totals	5,642.75	181,634	211,559	222,510	Sekadau	87	

=== Local government ===
The regency is a second-level administrative division equivalent to a city. As a regency, it is headed by a regent who is elected democratically. Head of districts are appointed directly by the regent with the recommendation of the regency secretary. Executive power lies with the regent and vice regent, while legislative function is exercised by the regency's parliament.

== Infrastructure ==
=== Education ===
As of 2020, there are 35 kindergartens in the regency, 241 elementary schools, 67 junior high schools, and 23 senior high schools. In addition, the regency has six vocational high schools. It only has one higher educational institution, the Keling Kumang Institute, which is private but partially supported by the regency government. The institute campus is located in the town of Sekadau and focuses on technology-related programs such as agro-technology and computer science. The regency also has one public library maintained by the regency government, also located at its regency seat, the town of Sekadau.

There are also four Islamic boarding schools (pesantren) in the regency as at 2020.

=== Healthcare ===
The regency has one hospital, four polyclinics, 67 puskesmas, and 6 pharmacies. The only hospital in the regency, Sekadau Regional Hospital, is a public hospital owned by regency government. It is classified as C-class by Ministry of Health and located just across the town of Sekadau. In addition, there are two family planning clinics, 10 village medical clinics, 239 healthcare posts, and 109 maternity cottages.

=== Transportation ===
There are 852.85 kilometres of road in the regency, out of which 584.501 kilometres are maintained by regency government. From those 584.501 kilometres, 115.436 kilometres have not yet sealed and still have a soil surface as of 2020. There is no airport in the regency and the main transportation is by using road travel. The closest airport is Tebelian Airport which is located in Sintang Regency.

=== Others ===
There are exactly 272 mosques, 149 Protestant churches, 303 Catholic churches, three Chinese Buddhist temples (Vihara), and seven Confucian temples (klenteng).
