= Selako people =

Sub-ethnic group of Dayak native to Central Kalimantan

Selakau; Silakau; Salako

Total population
- 208,100

Regions with significant populations
- Indonesia (West Kalimantan): 138,100
- Malaysia (Sarawak): 70,000

Languages
- Selako

Religion
- Kaharingan; Christianity (Protestanism and Catholicism)

Related ethnic groups
- Bidayuh; Mualang; Kendayan; Iban

Selako a.k.a. Selakau, Salako or Silakau are the indigenous people native to the Selakau regions (Selakau district and Selakau Timur district) in Sambas Regency of West Kalimantan, Indonesia. Nowadays, the Selako diaspora can be found in the neighbouring Selakau regions as well; including the districts of Pemangkat, Paloh, Tebas, Teluk Keramat, Sejangkung (especially in Perigi Limus), Sajingan Besar in Sambas Regency, the East Singkawang district (especially in Pajintan, Bagak Sahwa, Maya Sopa, and Nyarumkop) in Singkawang, the districts of Tujuh Belas and Samalantan in Bengkayang Regency, and the Lundu district in Sarawak. Selako people are sometimes classified as part of larger Dayaks community (the term used for indigenous people of Kalimantan in general), thus sometimes they are called as Selako Dayaks as well. Their native or indigenous language is the Selako language. Like any other indigenous Dayak groups, the Selako people embraced the Kaharingan religion, but many Selakos diaspora tend to have Christians (mostly adhered to West Kalimantan Christian Church, Bornean Evangelicals, and Anglicans) and Roman Catholics faiths after the mass conversion by missionaries in the 19th century.

== Sub-groups ==
There are at least five Selako sub-groups that are differentiated based on their particular customs:

1. Badamea Selako
2. Gajekng Selako
3. Garantukng Selako
4. Sakawokng Selako
5. Sangkuku' Selako

=== Comparison ===
==== Gajekng vs. Sangkuku' ====
According to William Martin Schneider, there are no significant differences between the group of Gajekng and Sangkuku', but some small difference might be noticeable.

- Food preparation

There are two different ways on how traditional Selako foods are prepared. In Gajekng Selako, the bontokng is wrapped with the lepet amo', meanwhile the Sangkuku' Selako tend to wrap it with the karake' way.

- Procession members

The traditional processions within the Salako Gajekng group should involves the panglima (commander), pamane (expert), and pabanci (people who are famous for being good at custom, intelligent, powerful, and authoritative). Their task is to regulate and determine the types and instruments of customs as well as the conduct of traditional ritual ceremonies. Meanwhile, in Sangkuku' Selako group, the procession is carried out by the common people whose gonna act as the traditional implementers or customary actors.

== Origin ==
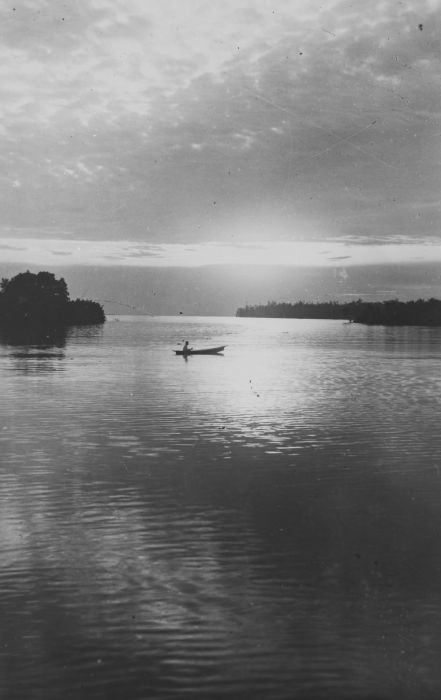
Tropenmuseum collection photo of Nyirih River in Selakau district, Sambas Regency, West Kalimantan

Selako people are originally the inhabitants of the Nyirih riverbank, located in Selakau district of Sambas Regency. Most Selakos still predominantly lived in their ancestral home around the Nyirih River regions (especially in the districts of Selakau and Selakau Timur). However, the Garantukng Selako group acknowledged that they are actually originated from Garantung in the Maliku district in Central Kalimantan.

== Selako ritual festivals and rites ==
=== Babuakng Sia ===
The Babuakng Sia is a form of circumcision within the Selako community, this practice seen (by Selako people) as both native religious rite and cultural tradition. It is an obligation for Selako males (especially during childhood and adolescence), and not obligated for women. Before the procession began, there are several things (a.k.a. offerings) that must be provided by the family, such as enyekng (pork), manok (chicken), sugar, coffee, cooking oil, and so on.

=== Ngabayotn ===
Ngabayotn is an annual ceremony held by the Selako people in year-end period. This ritual is carried out with the aim of conveying gratitude, especially for the rice harvest to the Selako community. The Ngabayotn traditional ceremony is held after the rice harvest which means that the local community will restart the agricultural year by opening new fields which are usually marked by the Sam-sam ritual. Ngabayotn consists of three ritual parts; namely the Nurutni', Nyangohotn, Matekng and accompanied by the Narokng dance performance.
