= Mualang =

Mualang may be,

- Mualang people
- Mualang language
