= Kendayan =

Kendayan may refer to:

- Kendayan language, a Malayic Dayak language spoken in Borneo
- Kendayan people, an ethnic group of the Dayak people group from Borneo
