= Kendayan people =

Indonesian ethnic group

Kendayan people Dayak Kanayatn
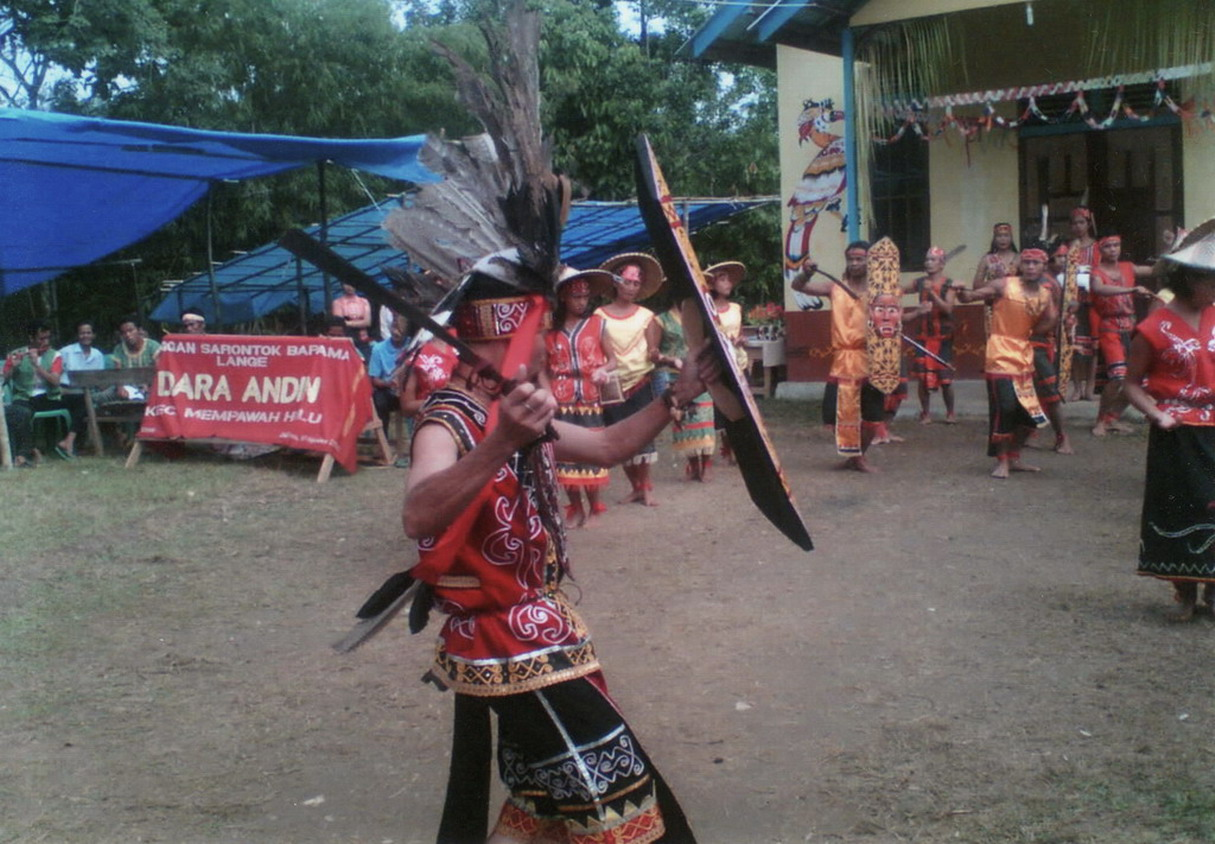
- A Kendayan dancer in traditional attire performs at a church dedication service in Landak Regency, West Kalimantan, Indonesia.

Total population
- 366,000

Regions with significant populations
- Indonesia (West Kalimantan)

Languages
- Kendayan language, Indonesian

Religion
- Folk religion (predominantly), Christianity, Islam

Related ethnic groups
- Bidayuh (Selako people)

The Kendayan (also known as Dayak Kenyan or Kanayatn) are an Indonesian ethnic group native to West Kalimantan, Indonesia in Borneo. The population of the group is around 366,000.

== Language ==
Kanayatn languages has a high dialectal variety, it encompass the Brahe, Badame, Jare, and Bang App dialects. Socio-linguistically, it is very difficult to specify the language repertoire because it is used with various dialects and patois pronunciation. However, these languages are all considered a part of the Malayic language family which also includes Indonesia's official language, Bahasa Indonesia.

The increased adoption of Indonesian words by the Kanayatn has drastically changed Dayak Kanayatn dialects for modern speakers. With many speakers of traditional dialects in the older generations, this change has resulted in communication problems between generations.

== Weapons ==
The Tangkitn is a unique weapon to the Kanayatn people and was used as their primary head-hunting weapon in the past. In the Salako language, the Tangkitn is also referred to as the Parang Pandat. The Kanayatn tribe employed shields to deflect attacks from swords. According to the Kanayatn people in Mempawah (Compaq-mem pa wah Hulu-mental-too-Sada Niang), there are two types of shields in Kanayatn culture: Gun amp and Jabakng. However, according to Kanayatn members in Landak (including sea Ambawang and Kuala Mandor), there is just one type of shield, namely Gun amp.

== Religion ==
The original religion of the Kanayatn people is not the Kaharingan as it is with the Dayak people. Kanayatn Dayak's indigenous religion is inseparable from their customs (Adat). It can even be said their customs assert their religious identity. In daily practice, Kanayatn Dayak people never mention religion as their normative, but Adat (custom). This religious system is not a Hindu Kaharingan system.

Kanayatn people refer to God as Juba. Juba is said to have passed down indigenous customs to the ancestors of Dayak Kanayatn located in Bukit Ba wang (now entering the district Bengkayang). In expressing belief in Jubata, they have a place of worship called "panyugu" or "padagi" (kadiaman). It is also important for the panyangahatn priest to become a liaison between man and God (Jubata).

Today, many Dayak Kanayatn have embraced other religions, including Christianity and Islam. Kenanyatn people who have embraced another religion may no longer consider themselves as Dayak Kanayatn once they have abandoned their customary practices. Similarly, Kanayatn people who have embraced Islam will no longer regard themselves as Dayak, but as Malay people or Orang laut.

== Ethnic origins (disputed) ==
The Kanayatn were grouped into the category clump Land Dayak-Kalimantan by H. J. Mallinckrodt; but according to C. H. Duman, they are part of the Kanayatn Dayak Ot Danum Clump-Maanyan-Ngaju. However, research completed by W. Stohr conflicts with C. H. Duman's theory. Stohr's research suggests that when considering aspects of the region, language and customary law, the Dayak Kanayatn group appears to be more closely associated with the Land Dayak-Kalimantan group than the Ot-Danum-Maanyan-Ngaju group. Landmark District names have been based on the majority Dayak community Kanayatn which is part of the clump Land Dayak (or Land Djak in Dutch spelling). Kanayatn and Salako are, in fact, one tribe and Salako people assume that "Kanayatn" is not the real name of this tribe.

== Folk songs ==
- Kao Ada Ka Atiku
- Tagila-Gila
- Taringat Ka' Kao
- Cintaku Ka' Ia
- Pasatn Urakng Tuha
- Batamu
- Babalas Pantun
- Gawe Panganten
- Nunggu Kao Pulakng
- Bakanalatn
- Lupa Ka' Janji
- Buah Atiku
- Sayang
- Bapantun
- Kambang Bepanggel
- Sayangku Ka Kao
- Ka'o Ningalat'n
- Malam Batabur Bintakng
- Niat Idup Badua
- 4 Tingkakok Nimang Padi
