= Baruk (house) =

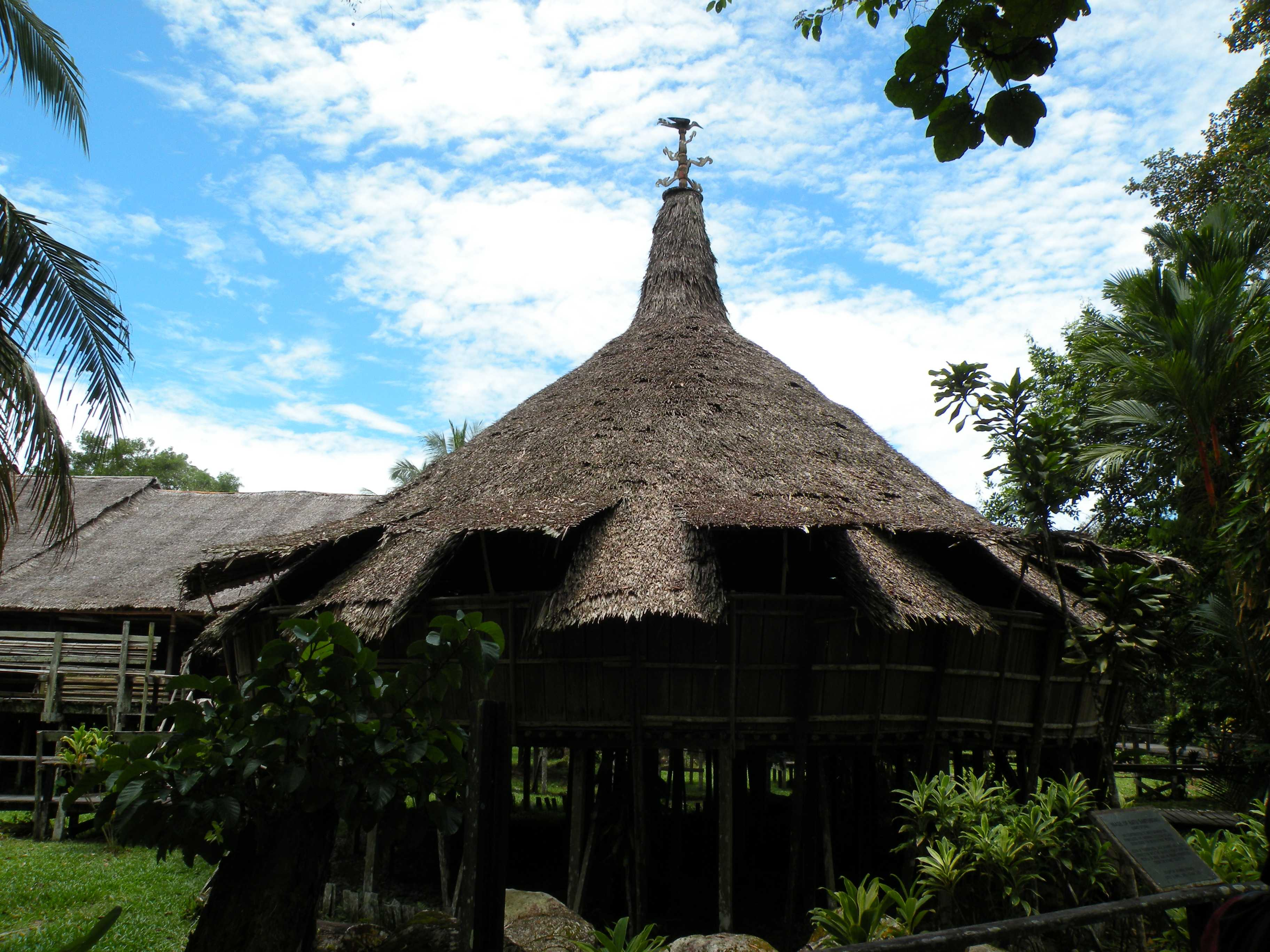
Baruk

Baruk is a traditional Bidayuh communal house characterised by its round shape and conical roof. It has been built in various part of western part of Sarawak, Malaysia like Bau, and Serian and also some parts of West Kalimantan.

== Names ==
The most common name of this house is baruk which comes from Bau Bidayuh language. Several variations of this name includes pangah in Biatah Bidayuh language and balu in Bukar-Sadong Bidayuh language.

== Background ==
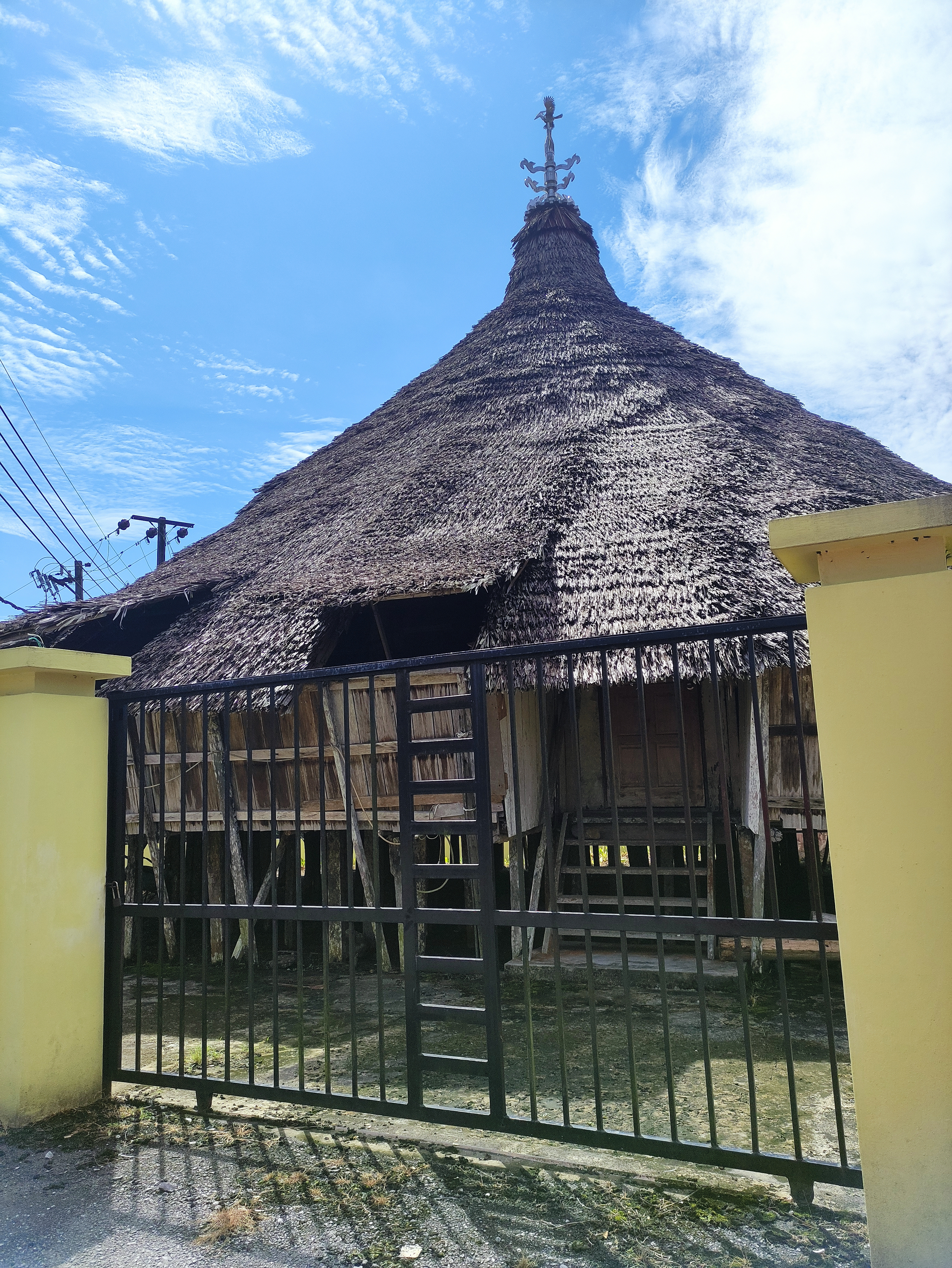
Bidayuh baruk in Kampung Opar, Bau

Baruk is utilised as a traditional headhouse, meeting place, a bachelor residence and also a ritual place. For this reason, baruk is often built in the middle of the village, and either on a hill or taller than the rest of the houses to reflect its importance.

It is believed that the first baruk to be built is situated at Kampung Opar, Bau. This baruk is built with Bornean ironwood and kapur wood, so they could discuss about the solution of disease outbreak among their community. While the earliest documented references to the Bidayuh baruk date to the 1848, when British colonial administrator and naturalist Sir Hugh Low described the structure in his work Sarawak, Its Inhabitants and Productions. In his work, it is reported that baruk is the most standing apart house of every houses or longhouse in a Bidayuh villages.

== Function ==
Apart from a meeting place, baruk is used for keeping skulls which was gained from headhunting as a self-defense. These skulls would be used for ritual performed in the same house. In connection with headhunting practices, the baruk also functioned as a communal sleeping space for unmarried males. Adolescent boys were likewise encouraged to sleep in the structure, and unmarried men typically continued to do so until marriage. This is because the baruk also functioned as a defensive structure, used in the event of a sudden attack on the village.

== Design in modern building ==
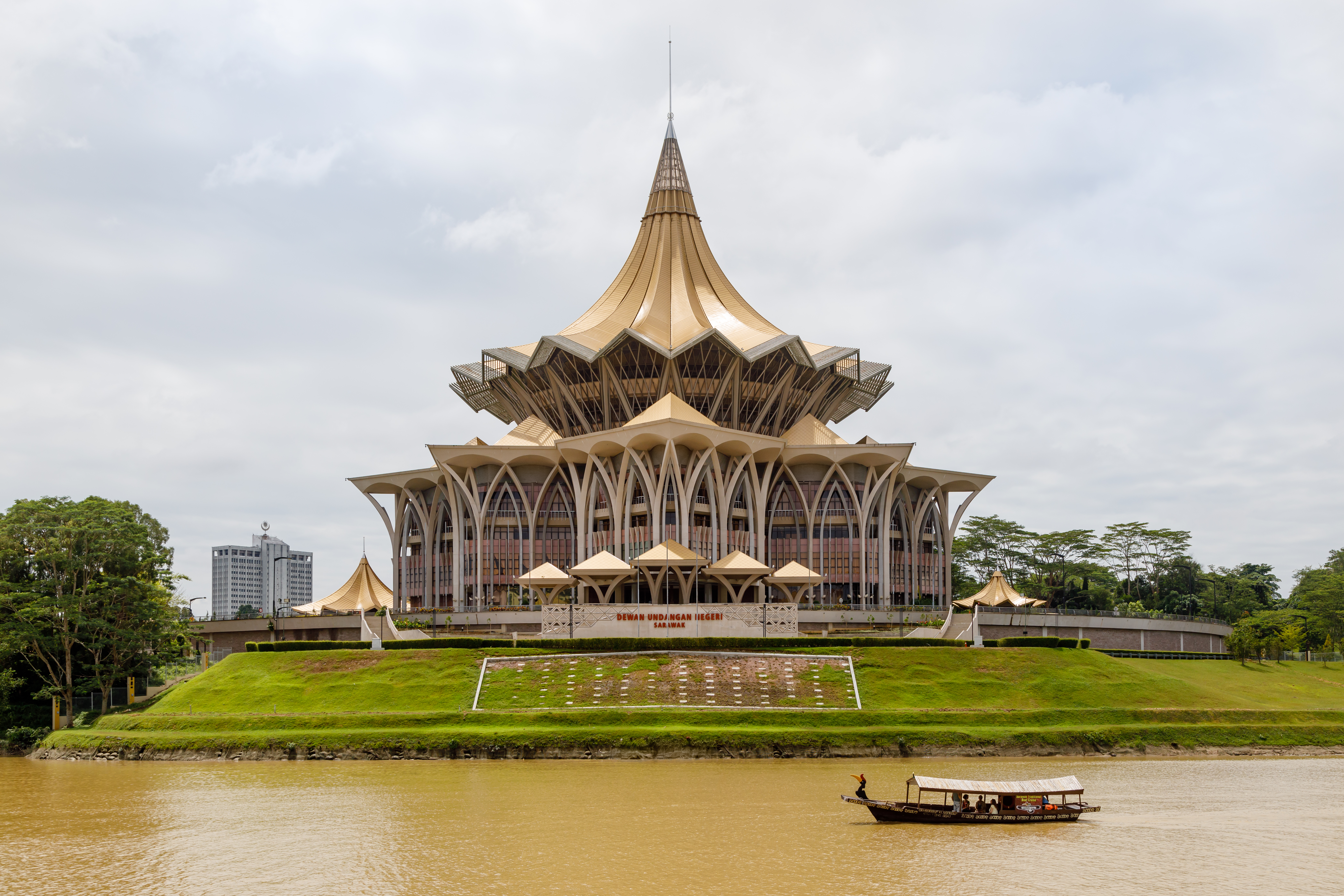
New Sarawak State Legislative Assembly Building

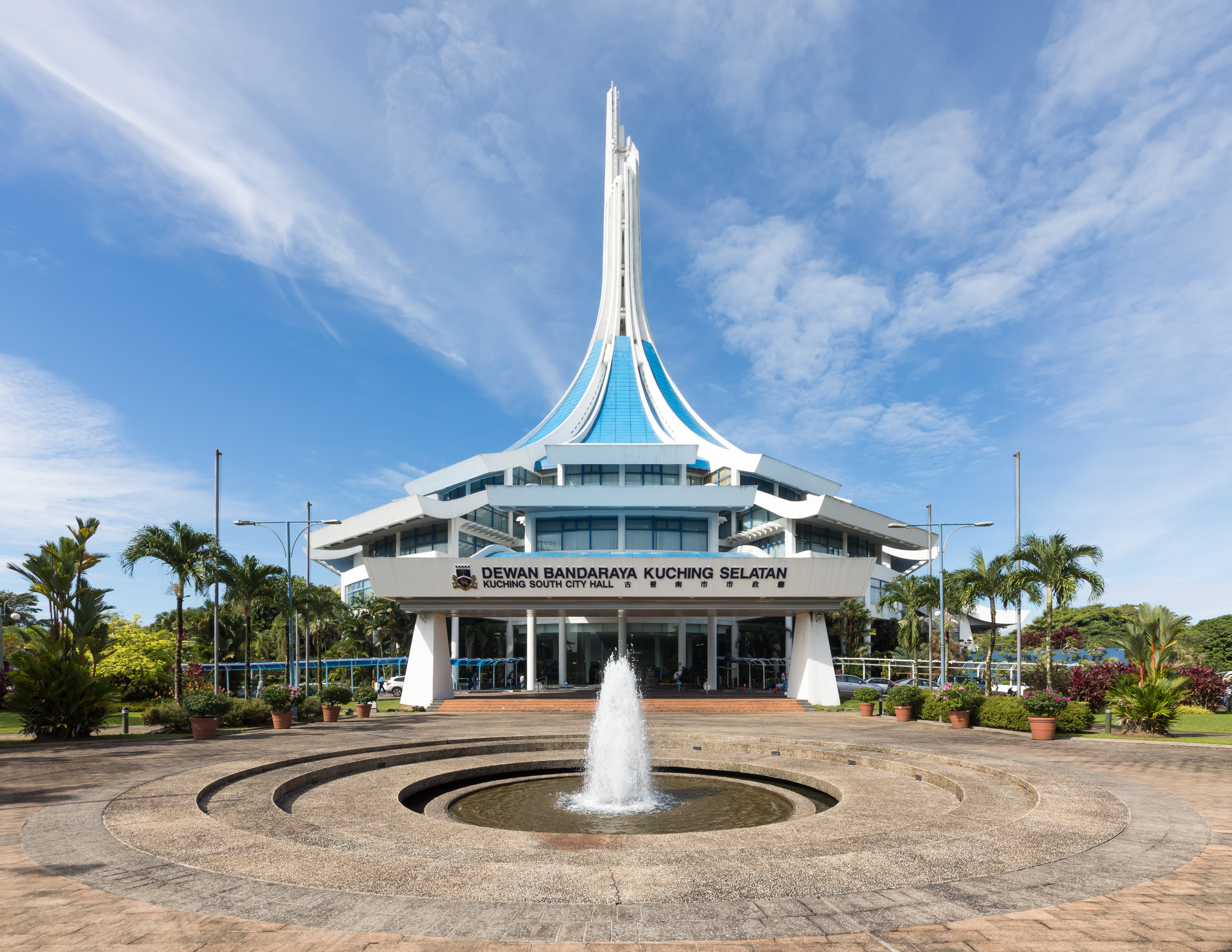
Kuching South City Hall

There are several modern building which takes design inspiration from baruk, including New Sarawak State Legislative Assembly Building, Kuching South City Council Hall, and Bau Civic Centre.
