= Nyobeng =

Ancient ritual performed to show gratitude

The Nyobeng/Nyobong is an ancient Dayak headhunting ritual that was performed to show gratitude for peace and good harvests. The ritual involved bathing or cleaning the skulls of sacrificed humans. The ceremony was performed by the Dayak Nyobeng Bidayu, Sebujit Hamlet, Village Hlibuei, Subdistrict Siding, Bengkayang and West Kalimantan, Indonesia. It was abandoned in 1894.

== Ceremony ==
In the ceremony, humans were decapitated and their skulls preserved. It took place over a three-day period in June, led by elder Nyobeng Sebujit. As the guests arrived, the participants aimed their guns at the sky and fired a salute, intended as a sign of respect for their ancestors before starting the nyobeng. Guests were welcomed to show the bond between the village and people outside the village. Later, a local community leader would throw a puppu into the air as visitors attempted to slash it with swords as it fell, repeating the process if the animal reached the ground alive. The elder then repeated the process with a chicken. Later, residents would toss chicken eggs in the direction of the guests. Breaking eggs in such a way was seen as a demonstration of sincerity. If the egg did not break, it meant that the guests who came to the village were not sincere or genuine.

The elders stored the skulls in a box with a boar necklace. The Dayak Bidayuh consider the head to be a symbol of human identity and the skull to be the world's most powerful magic, capable of increasing crop yields and warding off evil spirits.

While headhunting has long been abandoned by Dayak Bidayuh people, a modified nyobeng ritual continues to be preserved as a traditional way to manifest peace and gratitude for good harvests.
