= Malcolm Sim Mejin =

Malaysian author

- Born: Kuching, Sarawak, Malaysia
- Education: Green Road National Secondary School
- Occupation: Novelist
- Years active: 2010–present
- Notable work: Diary of a Rich Kid
- Website: www.malcolm-mejin.com

Malcolm Mejin is a Malaysian author of contemporary adult novels and children's books. He is the author of the national bestselling novel series, Diary of a Rich Kid. and the latest 2026 series, Really Rich, Really Robin.

== Background and personal life ==
Malcolm was born in Kuching, Sarawak, Malaysia. He is of Bidayuh-Chinese descent. He started writing since he was six years old. He previously worked as a copywriter and editor, before quitting a steady job to be a full-time writer. He currently resides in Johor Bahru.

== Bibliography ==
- Diary of a Rich Kid (2018–present) (series)
- Cool Diary (2012)
- Ivan Joe (story series), for Pelangi Scientist
- Zany Zombie (2010–present) (series)
- Women in Boots (short story), shortlisted in the MPH Search for Young Writers competition and appears in the 2005 collection, Rewind, Fast Forward: An Anthology.
