= Simping Island =

Island in Singkawang, Indonesia

Simping (Indonesian: Pulau Simping), located in Singkawang City, West Kalimantan, is the smallest island in the world with an area of about 0.5 hectares (2,033 square meters). This island was previously known as Kelapa Dua Island before getting the name Simping Island. Its status as the smallest island in the world has been recognized by the United Nations (UN), as stated on the sign on the bridge to the island.

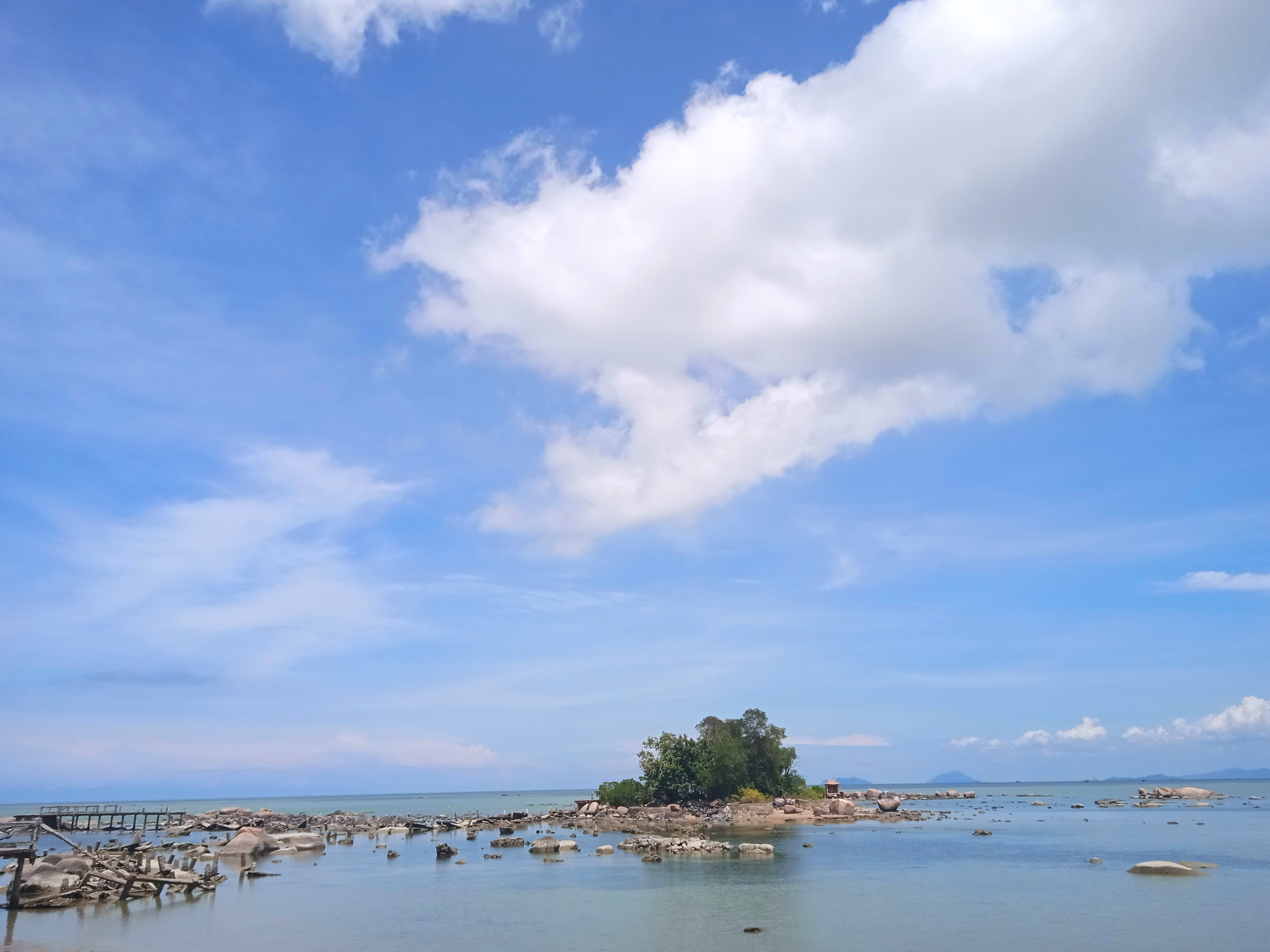
Simping Island

Simping Island is uninhabited and has a history of being inhabited before being abandoned due to severe abrasion. The island consists of sand, rocks, several trees, and a small temple used for praying by Chinese residents.

The island can be access through a 100-meter walk across the bridge from Teluk Mak Jantu. The island offers beautiful views of the beach, sea, and rock formations, and allows activities such as swimming in shallow waters.
