= Bidayuh =

Ethnic group from Borneo

Bidayuh people Land Dayak / Klemantan
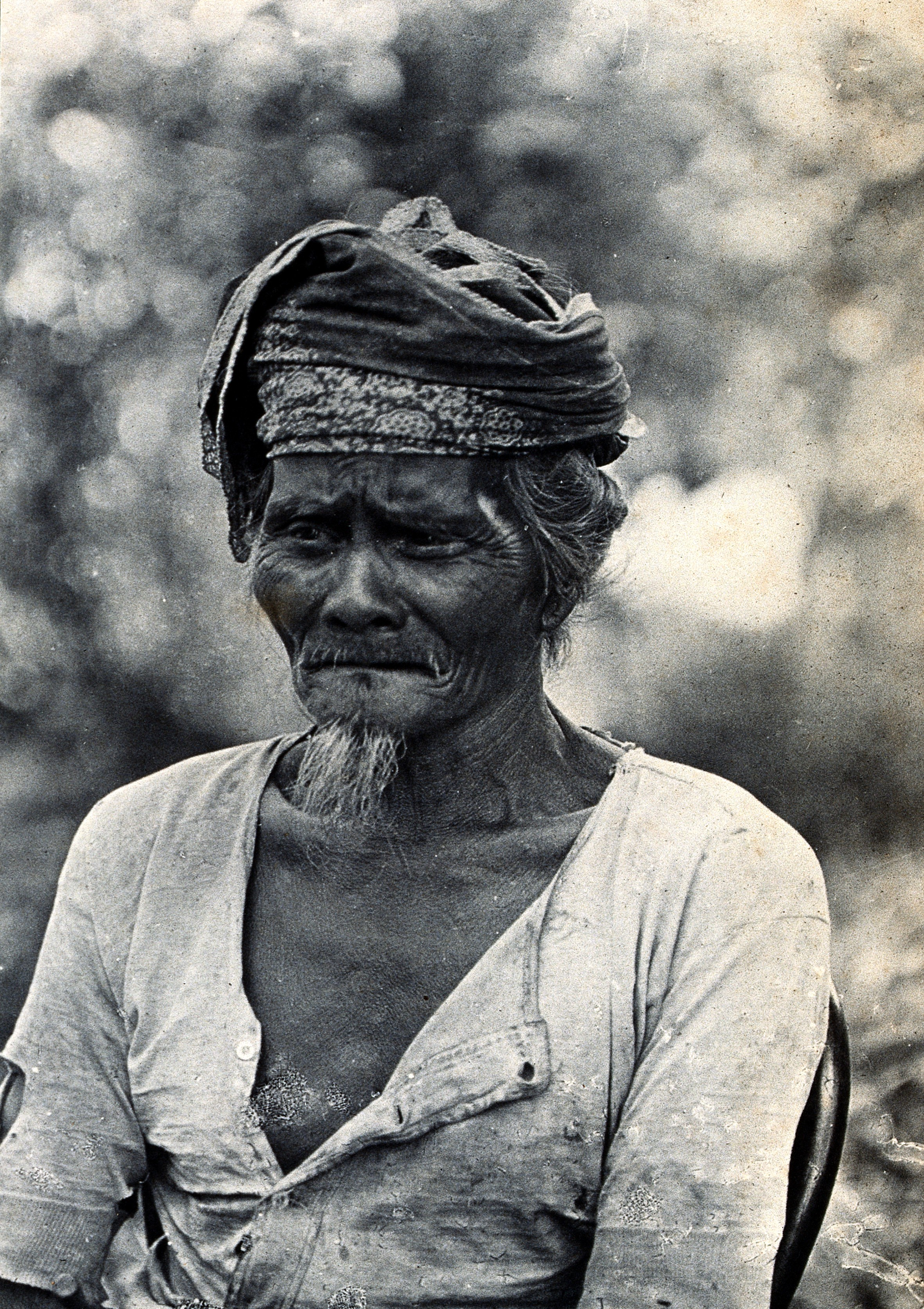
- A native Land Dayak chief in Sarawak, Malaysia.

Total population
- 287,500 (2025)

Regions with significant populations
- Borneo
- Malaysia (Sarawak): 249,570 (2025)
- Indonesia (West Kalimantan): n/a

Languages
- Bidayuh languages: Bukar Sadong, Jagoi, Biatah (Siburan and Padawan), Malaysian (Sarawak Malay dialect) or Indonesian, English, Iban (secondary language)

Religion
- majority Christianity minority: Islam and Animism

Related ethnic groups
- Bekati', Binyadu, Jongkang, Ribun, Selako, Lara', Sanggau, Sara', Tringgus, Semandang, Ahé

Bidayuh is the collective name for several indigenous groups found in southern Sarawak, Malaysia and northern West Kalimantan, Indonesia, on the island of Borneo, which are broadly similar in language and culture (see also issues below). The name Bidayuh means 'inhabitants of land'. Originally from the western part of Borneo, the collective name Land Dayak was first used during the period of Rajah James Brooke, the White Rajah of Sarawak. At times, they were also lesser referred to as Klemantan people. They constitute one of the main indigenous groups in Sarawak and West Kalimantan and live in towns and villages around Kuching and Serian in the Malaysian state of Sarawak, while in the Indonesian province of West Kalimantan they are mainly concentrated in the northern Sanggau Regency. In Sarawak, most of Bidayuh population can be found within 40 km of the geographical area known as Greater Kuching, within the Kuching and Serian Division. They are the second-largest Dayak ethnic group in Sarawak after the Iban and one of the major Dayak tribes in West Kalimantan.

== Settlement areas ==
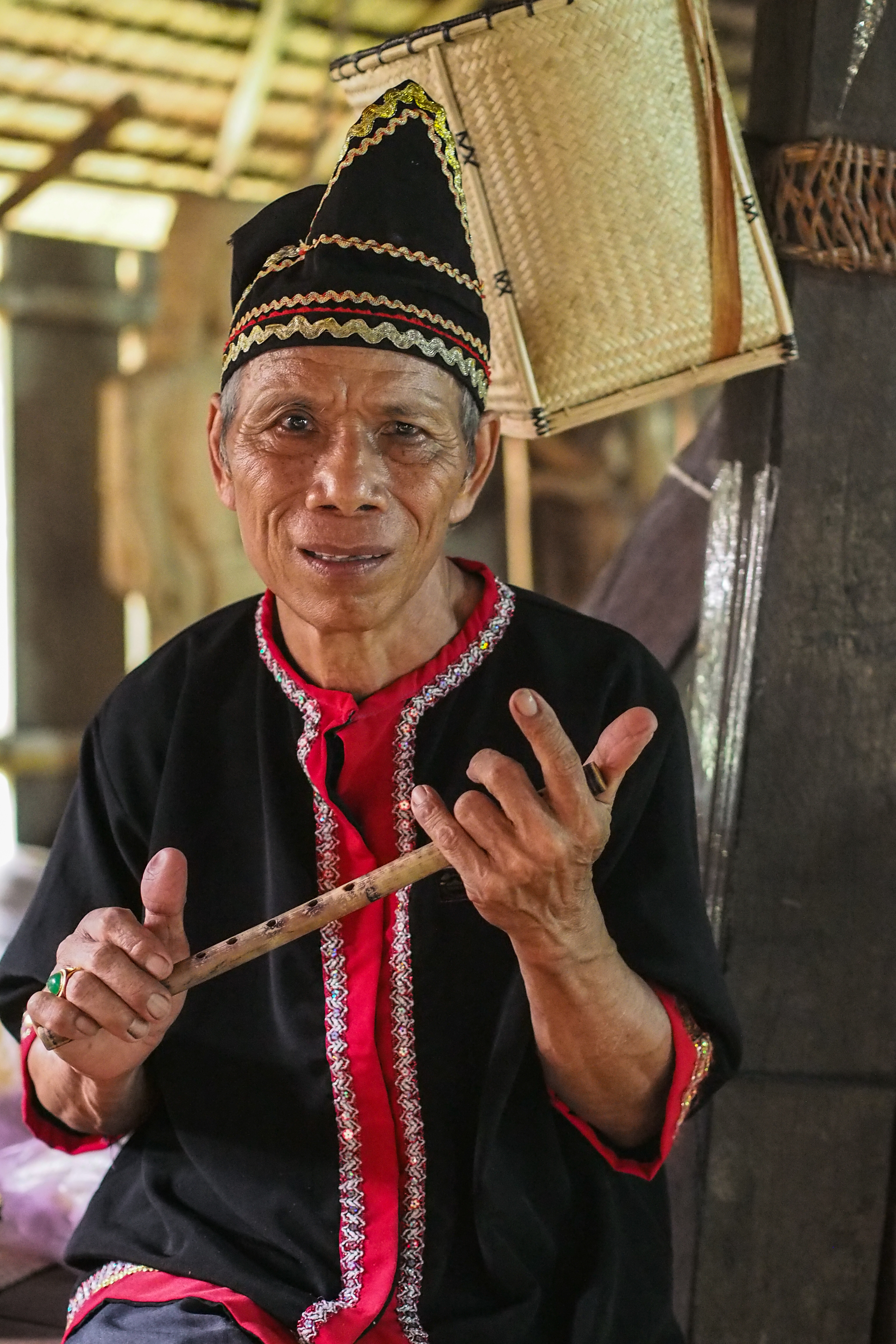
A Bidayuh man with a flute from Sarawak, Malaysia.

Predominantly Bidayuh areas in Sarawak are in the suburban areas of the state capital city of Kuching (Penrissen as well as Padawan areas), Lundu, Siburan, Bau and Serian. Most Bidayuh villages can be found in the rural areas of Padawan, Lundu, Penrissen, Bau and Serian. The area continues up to the adjacent West Kalimantan border, where they reside in Kembayan, Noyan, Sekayam, and Jangkang district in Sanggau Regency. The area in which they live is mainly in the basin of the Sarawak River and hilly to a mountainous forest, traditionally worked by rotational agriculture and hunting based around farms populated from parent villages situated on the hills for protection. Today, almost all the traditional longhouse villages have been replaced by individual houses, by roads and there are some plantation agriculture and a reduced emphasis on the growing of hill padi. Fruit trees, especially Durian, remain important property markers. The distinctive architectural and cultural feature of the Bidayuh is the head-house, now adopted as a symbol.

== Languages ==
There are approximately 25 dialects of Bidayuh (Land Dayak) spoken in Sarawak, Malaysia, which can be grouped into four clusters of dialects: Eastern, Central, Highland, and Western. In Sarawak, there are generally said to be three main linguistic groupings (Biatah, Singai-Jagoi, and Bukar–Sadong), but these can be broken down even beyond the list referenced below as most people can be distinguished by locals down to village level through smaller differences in vocabulary and intonation. Each area speaks its own dialect:

1. Lundu speaks Jagoi, Salako and Lara.
2. Bratak, Singai, Krokong, and Jagoi speak Singai-Jagoi.
3. Kampung Bunuk speak Bunuk (Segu-Benuk).
4. Siburan vicinity speaks Biatah.
5. Bidayuhs who live around Serian such as Tebakang, Mongkos, Tebedu to Tanjung Amo near the border of Kalimantan, Indonesia speak Sadong(Similar To Bukar but different dialects and accent).
6. Bidayuhs who live around Serian such as Baki, Baru, Taee, and Tarat speaks the Bukar language.
7. Bidayuhs in Padawan speak several but related dialects like Bi-Annah, Pinyawa, Braang, Bia', Bisepug, and Bisatang while in Penrissen speak Emperoh/Biperoh.
8. Bidayuh Moden speaks mixed languages, mixed languages between Padawan and Jagoi language (Semeba, Tematu, Bumbok, and Sudad).

The dialects are not mutually intelligible and Malaysian English or Malay are often used as commonly spoken languages within the community.

=== Linguistic issues ===
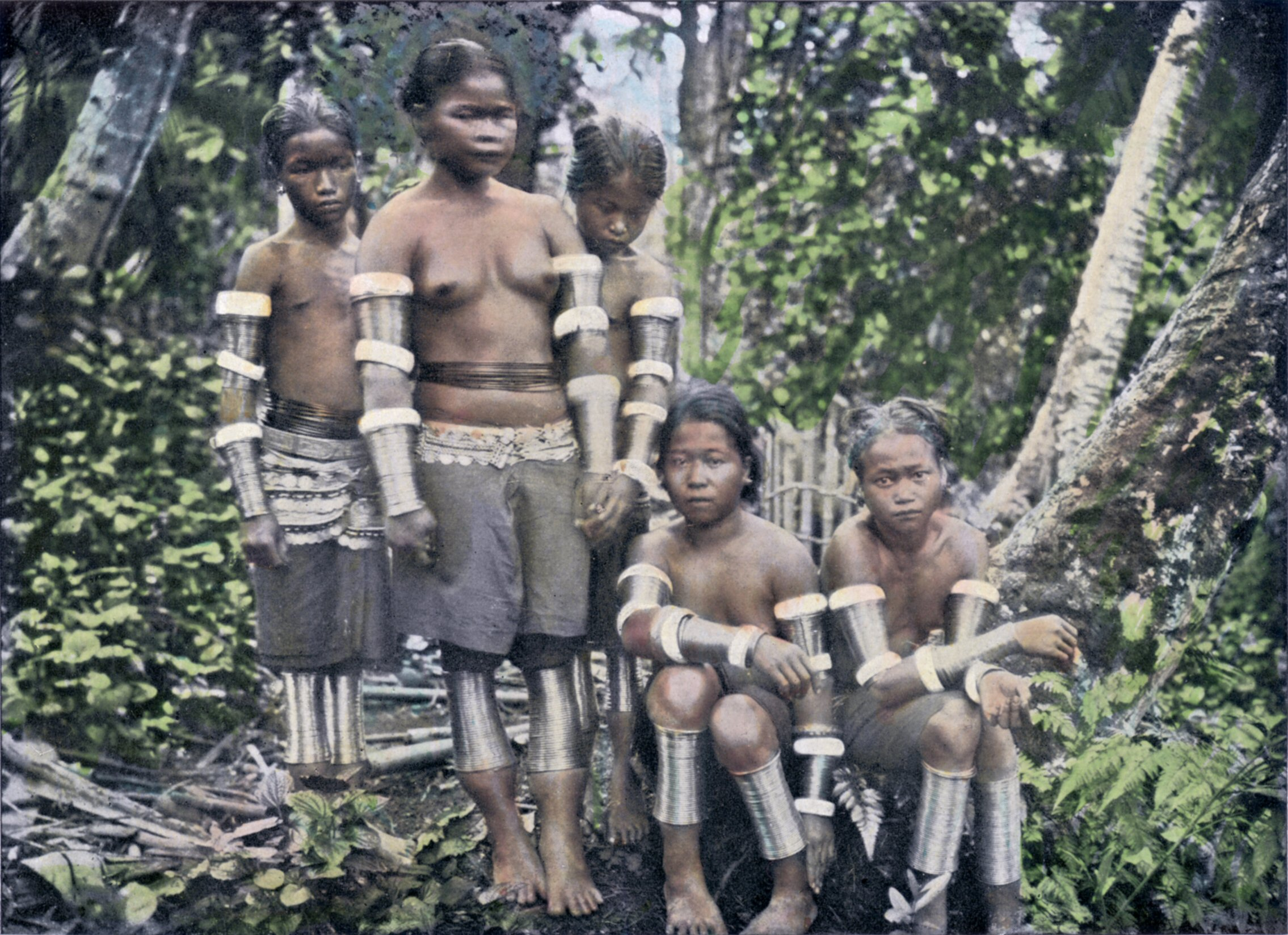
A group of Land Dayak women, possibly from Batang Sadong, Sarawak, Malaysia, 1910.

The Serian Bidayuhs have a distinct dialect known as Bukar–Sadong, which is not intelligible to Bidayuhs from other Districts. Here are some examples of the differences in the various dialects spoken in Serian, with their English and Malay equivalents. Also included are two Philippine languages, Kapampangan and Tagalog:

English	Malay	Bukar–Sadong	Bau-Jagoi	Siburan-Padawan	Bi-Annah	Bra'ang-Pinyawa	Lundu (Salako)	Kapampangan	Tagalog
Father	Bapa	Amang	Sama	Sama	Sama'	Sama'	Apak, Bapak	Ibpâ, (Bapa – Uncle)	Amang, Ama
Mother	Ibu	Andĕ/ayang/a'nek	Sino	Sendo	Sin(d)ū'	Sin(d)o	Inuk, Indok, Umak,	Indû	Inang, Ina
Food	makanan	pima-an	pinguman	pimaan	Pinguman	Pinguman	Pamakanan	Pamangan	Pagkain
Rice	nasi	songkoi/sungkoi	tubi	tubi	Tubi'	Tubi	nasik	nasi	kanin
I	aku	aku	oku	Ěku	Aku'	Ěku	aku	aku/I-aku	ako
You/thee	kamu/anda/engkau/kau	amu/akam	mu-u/ingan	ku-u/kaam	Ku'u/Ka'am(ng)/Angan	(K)u'u/ ka'am	kau	ika (sing.)/ikayu (pl.)	ikaw

== Religion and beliefs ==
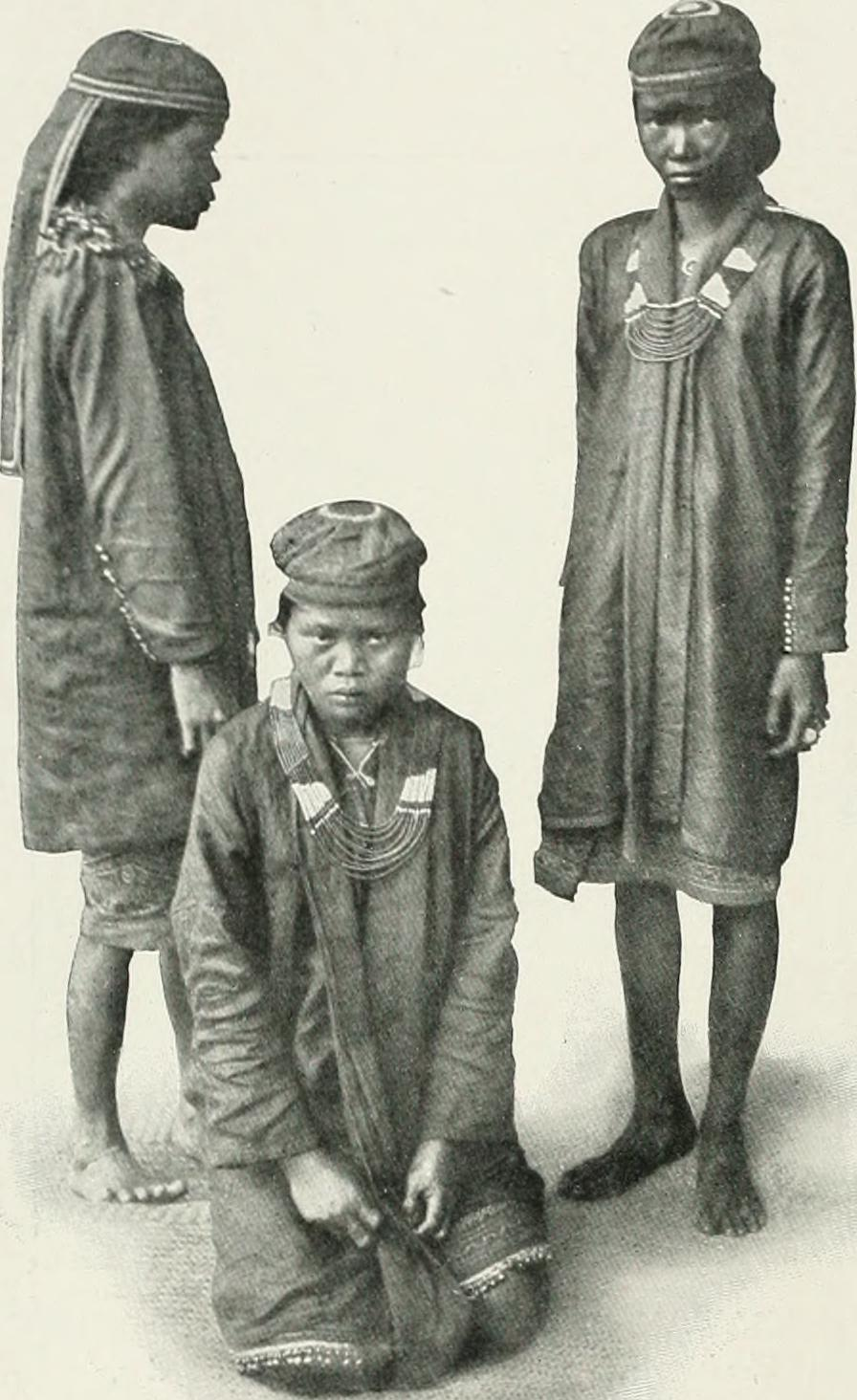
Bidyuh borich or female witch doctors, 1908.

Bidayuhs are traditionally animist or pagans, and vestiges of these beliefs remain. The Brooke family era saw the arrival of Christian missionaries from 1848, bringing education and modern medicine, while a similar process also took place in Dutch Borneo on the Dutch controlled side. The great majority of Bidayuh are now Christians, majority of them being Roman Catholic. Almost 70% of the people of Bidayuh have changed their traditional name to English name since they converted to Christianity and many young indigenous Bidayuh in Sarawak do not practice their traditional ceremonies anymore, weakening their culture as indigenous peoples of Sarawak. The Bidayuh people are the closest relative of the Melanau people and are said to have the same ancestor before splitting into different tribes. The original Bidayuhs are mainly pagans or animists, however 50% already converted to Christianity. They have big festivals like Gawai Dayak, which is a celebration to please the padi spirit for a good harvest.

Most Bidayuh villages have either a Roman Catholic or Anglican church, or a mosque. The Biatah people, who live in the Kuching area (Padawan/Lundu), are mostly Anglican with Catholic minorities. Meanwhile, the people who live in Bau or Serian are mostly Catholic. Catholicism was first introduced to people in Kampung Taee by the Mill Hill Missionaries in the early 1920s.

Some renowned churches were also being established in some villages such as SIB (Sidang Injil Borneo) also known as the Borneo Evangelical Mission (BEM) church, Baptist as well as other denominations like Seventh-Day Adventist (SDA), Assemblies of God, Methodist, Latter Rain, etc.

The Bidayuh of Bukar had a unique tradition of hanging the bodies of the dead on trees and leaving them to rot away. The skeletons are left on trees as a reminder of the dead. The tradition is rarely practiced nowadays.

The Bidayuh or Klemantan celebrate Gawai Padi (Paddy Festival) or Gawai Adat Naik Dingo (Paddy Storing Festival).

The Nyobeng/Nyobong was an ancient headhunting ritual that was performed to show gratitude for peace and good harvests. The ritual involved bathing or cleaning the skulls of sacrificed humans.

== Salako and Lara people ==
Although classified as "Bidayuh" by the Malaysian government, the Salako and Lara culture have little resemblance to other Bidayuh groups and their oral tradition claims different descent and migration histories. Linguistically, the Salako belong to another language family tree which is of the Malayic Dayak family (the same family as the Iban). The Lara, although said to be more related to the Bidayuh (Jagoi-Singai), speak a language almost not mutually intelligible at all with the Bidayuh but belonged to the same language family tree which is the Land Dayak. Even their customary rituals and rites differ from the other Bidayuhs (all Bidayuhs share almost the same ritual and customary rites).

== Culture ==
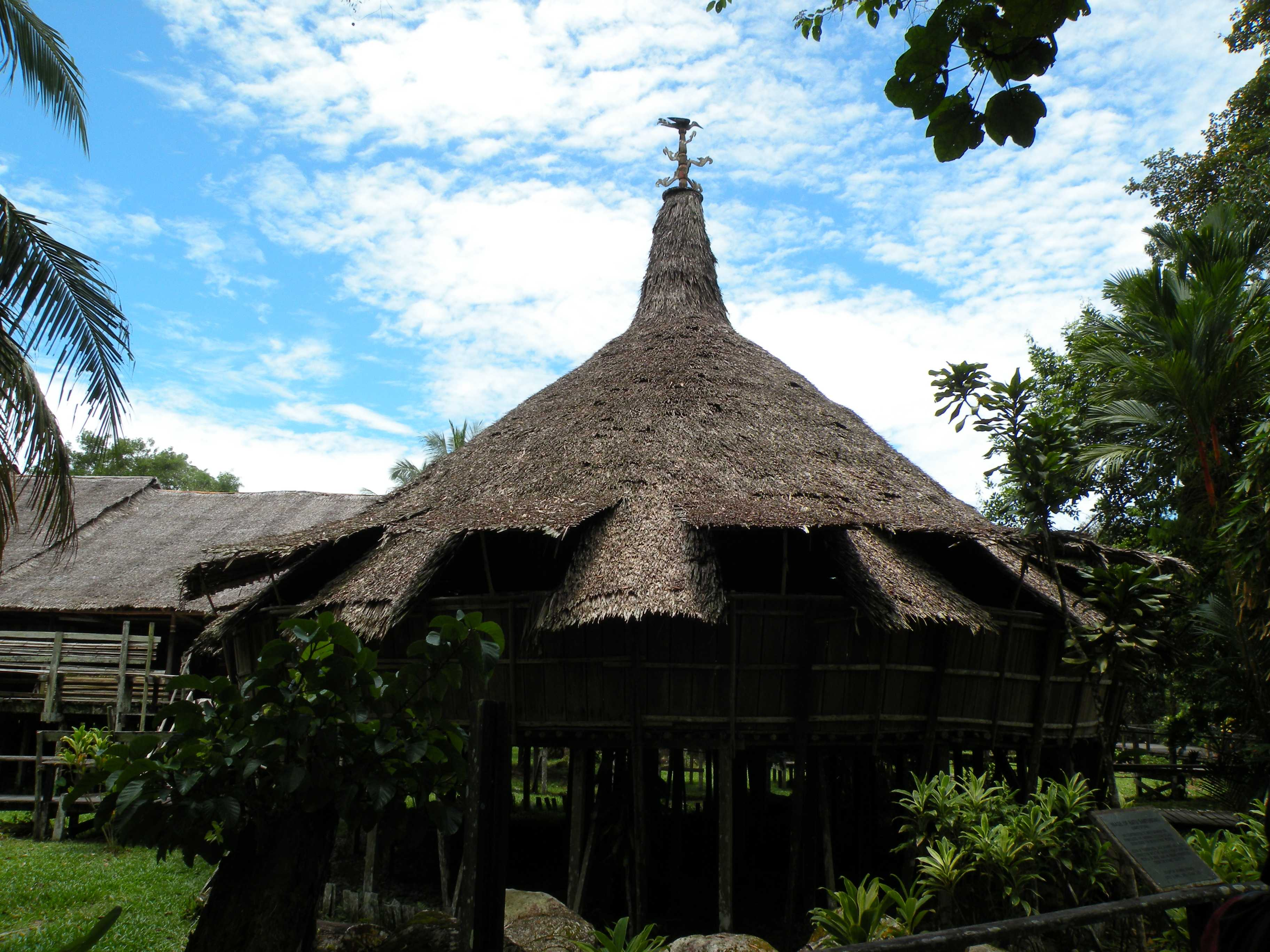
A traditional Bidayuh baruk roundhouse in Sarawak, Malaysia. It is a place for community gatherings.

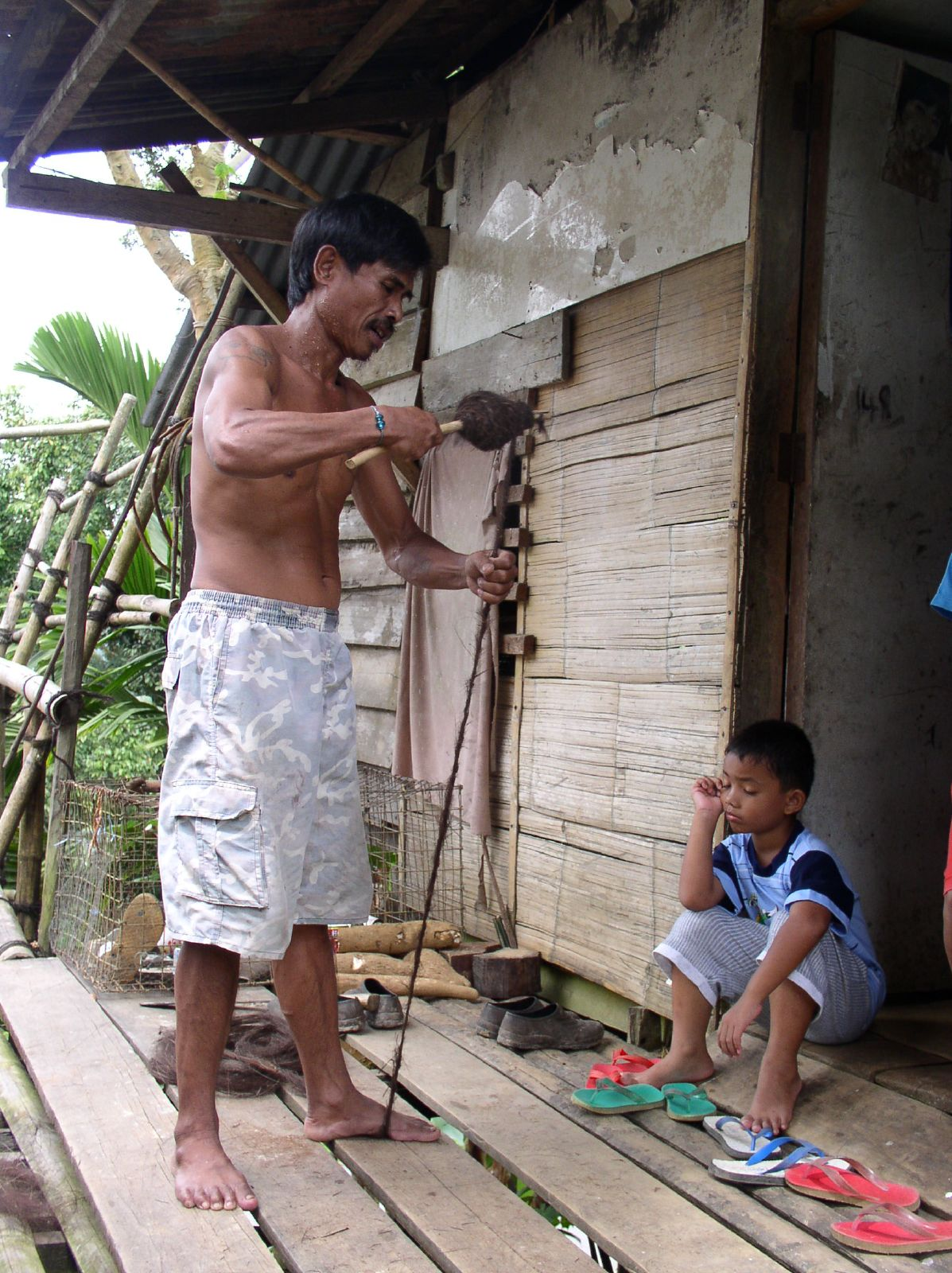
A Bidayuh man making rope in a traditional method.

=== Musical heritage ===
The Bidayuh have a musical heritage consisting of various types of agung ensembles - ensembles composed of large hanging, suspended or held, bossed/knobbed gongs which act as a drone without any accompanying melodic instrument. They also use a bamboo idiochord tube zither called pratuokng.

=== Traditional dance ===
- Nyigar

=== Traditional cuisine ===
Several traditional Bidayuh dishes are:

- Kasam Dihan goreng, fried fermented durian with pork and lemongrass condiment
- Rotung, sago cooked in bamboo
- Kubar, sweet sago pancakes
- Linut, sticky sago paste
- Assam, chicken and tapioca leaves cooked and served in a bamboo stalk
- Tobah / Kasam Pengak, preserved wild animal meat or pork, and fish

== Standard of Living ==
According to Professor Dr Peter Songan (graduate from Cornell University), in Year 2004 the Bidayuh Graduate community by category of qualification. From 1649 Bidayuh graduates, there a majority of the graduates holds a diploma degree (45.1%), followed by bachelor (44.2%), masters (5.2%), Ph.D. (0.9%) and others (4.7%). where the Distribution of Graduates by Degree Frequency Percent, Diploma 743 holders 45.06% Bachelor 729 holders 44.21% Masters 85 holders 5.16% Ph.D. 15 holders 0.91% Others 77 holders 4.67% Total 1649 holders 100.00%

== Notable Bidayuhs ==
=== Politicians ===
- Cornelis, former governor of West Kalimantan.
- James Dawos Mamit, former Malaysian cabinet deputy minister.
- Michael Manyin Jawong, former Sarawak cabinet minister.
- Mordi Bimol, the Malaysian cabinet deputy minister and member of parliament for Mas Gading.
- Richard Riot Jaem, first ethnic Bidayuh to be appointed as a minister in the Malaysian cabinet.
- Willie Mongin, former Malaysian cabinet deputy minister.
- Robert Jacob Ridu, former Sarawak state legislative assembly speaker, also brother-in-law of fellow politician cum corporate figure, Idris Jala.

=== Artisans ===
- Anding Indrawani Zaini, an Akademi Fantasia star, model, actor and singer. He is of mixed Melanau-Bidayuh parentage.
- Tony Eusoff, actor and model.

=== Athletics ===
- Bonnie Bunyau Gustin, national powerlifter who won Malaysia's first ever gold medal in the sport in the men's 72 kg event at the 2020 Summer Paralympics in Tokyo, breaking the Paralympic record in the process.
- Bryan Nickson Lomas, former Malaysian national diving athlete. He was the youngest Malaysian athlete to qualify for 2004 Summer Olympics when he was 14.
- Pandelela Rinong, Malaysian national diving athlete.
- Venice Elphi anak Danny Kaya, Malaysian football player, played for ATM FA.

=== Beauty Pageants ===
- Dewi Liana Seriestha, Miss World 2014 Top 25 and Miss Talent for Miss World Beauty Pageant. She is of mixed Bidayuh-Indonesian parentage.

=== Others ===
- Made Katib, former Anglican bishop of the Diocese of Kuching.
- Malcolm Sim Mejin, author of contemporary adult novels and children's books. He is of mixed Bidayuh-Malaysian Chinese parentage.
