= Singkawang =

City in West Kalimantan, Indonesia

- City
- City of Singkawang; Kota Singkawang

Other transcription(s)
  - Chinese: 山口洋 (Hanzi); Shān kǒu yáng (Pinyin); Sân-gú-yòng (Pha̍k-fa-sṳ)
  - Jawi: سيڠكاوڠ
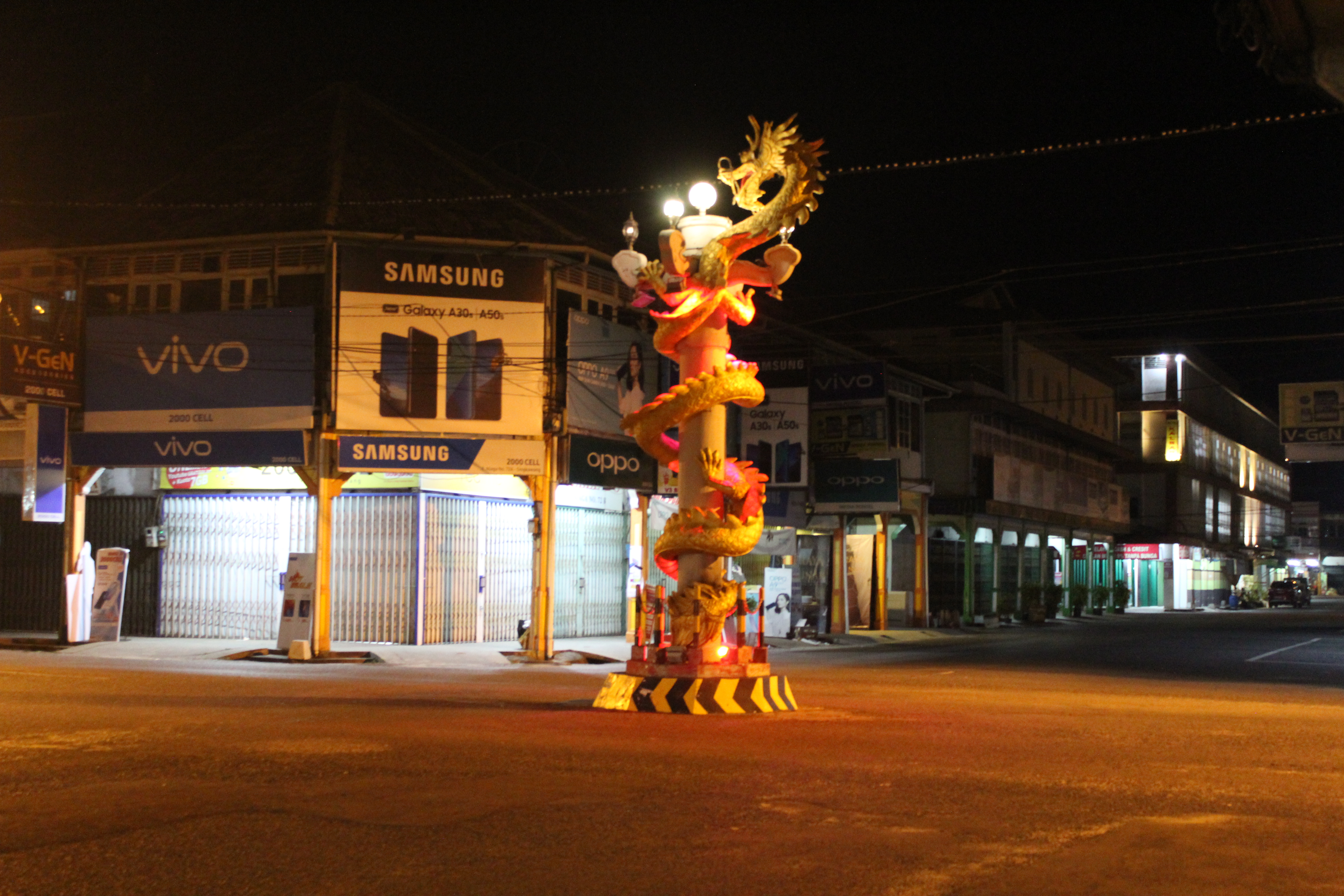
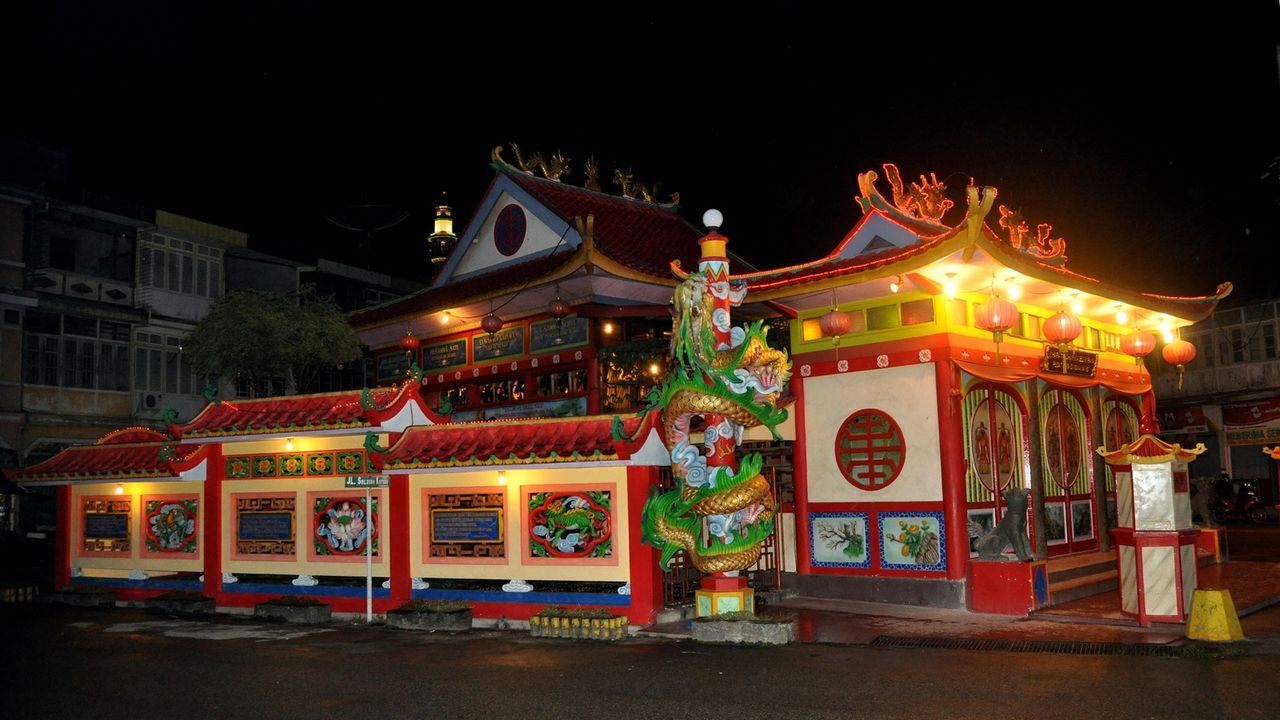
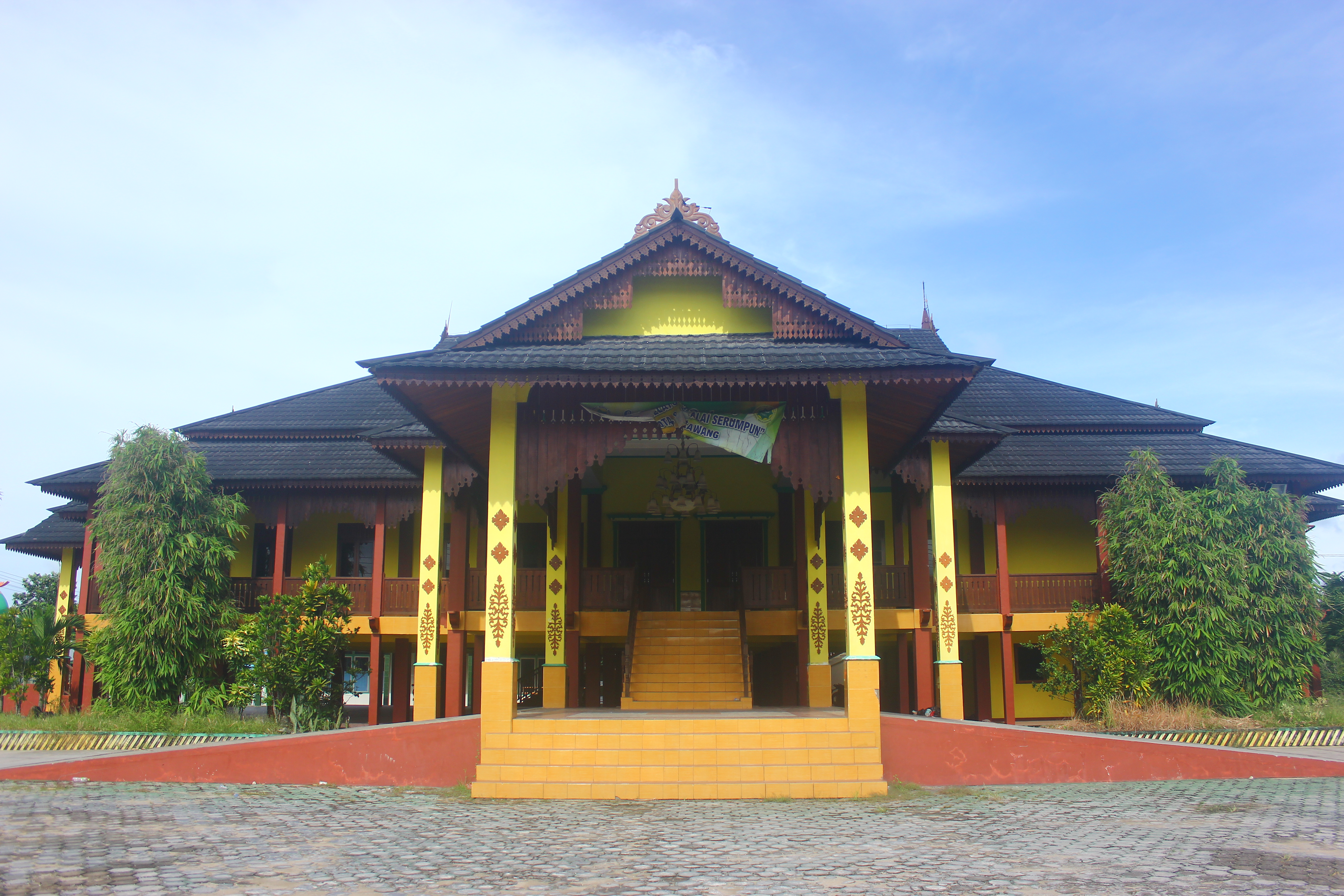
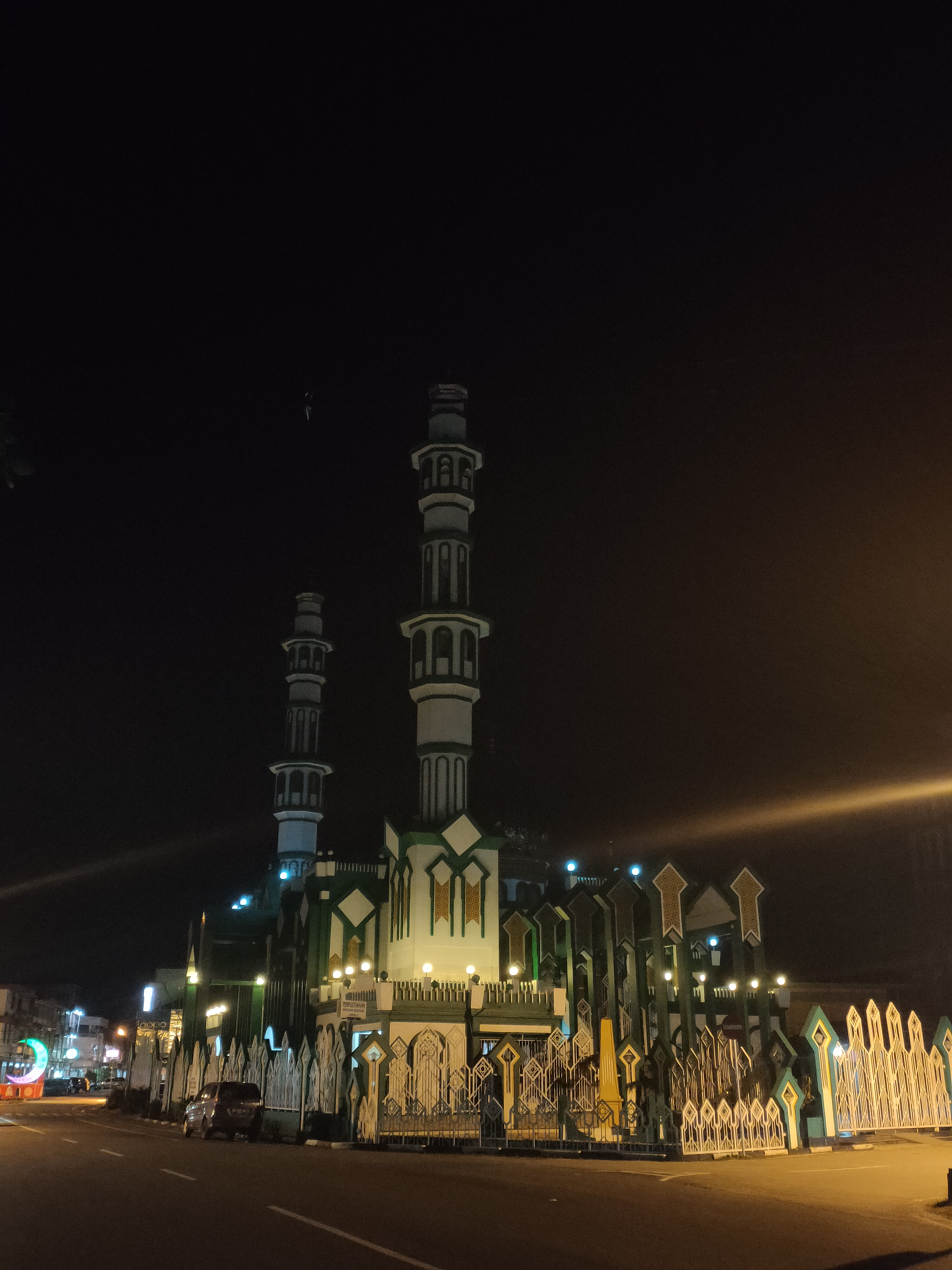
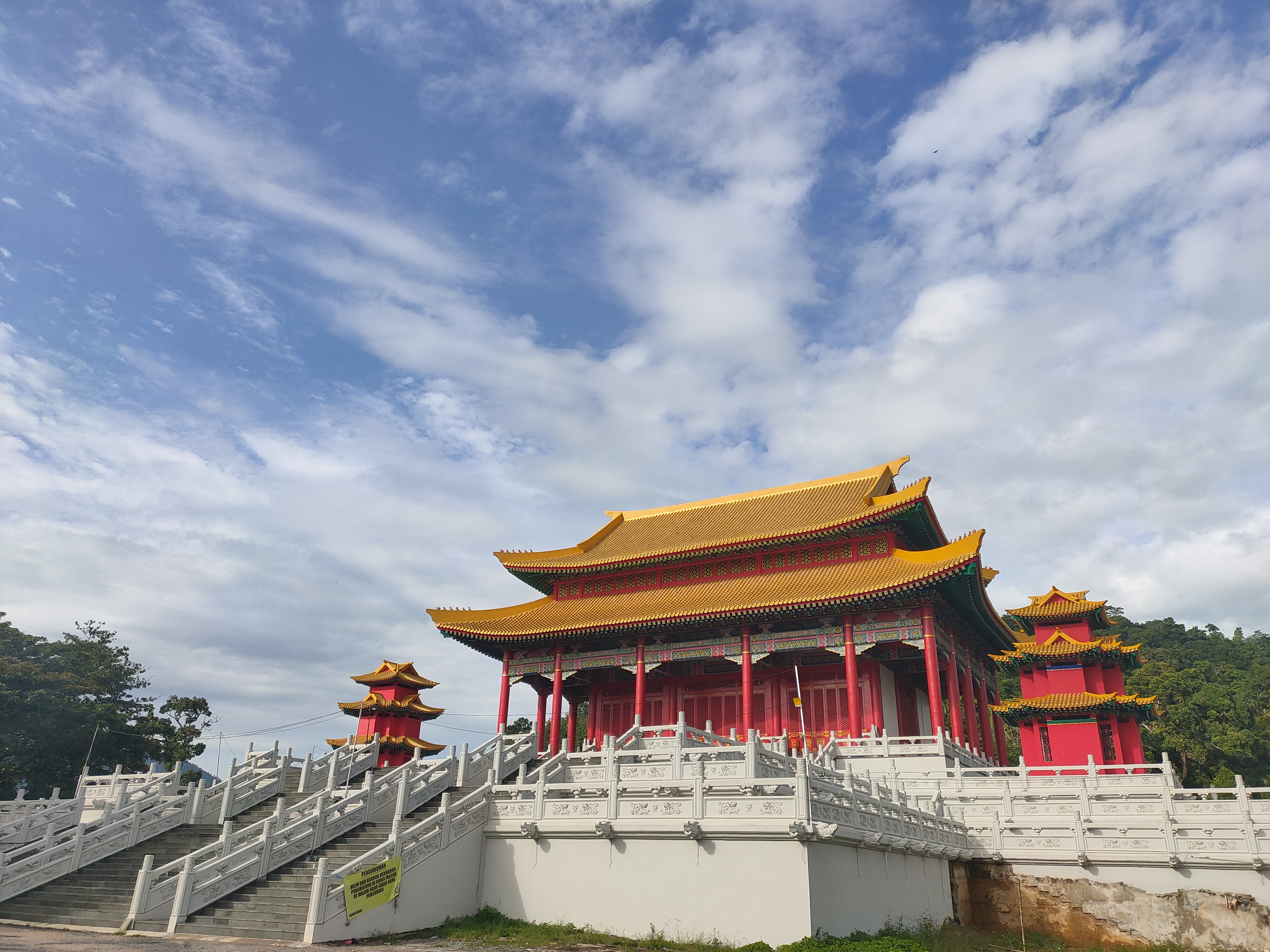
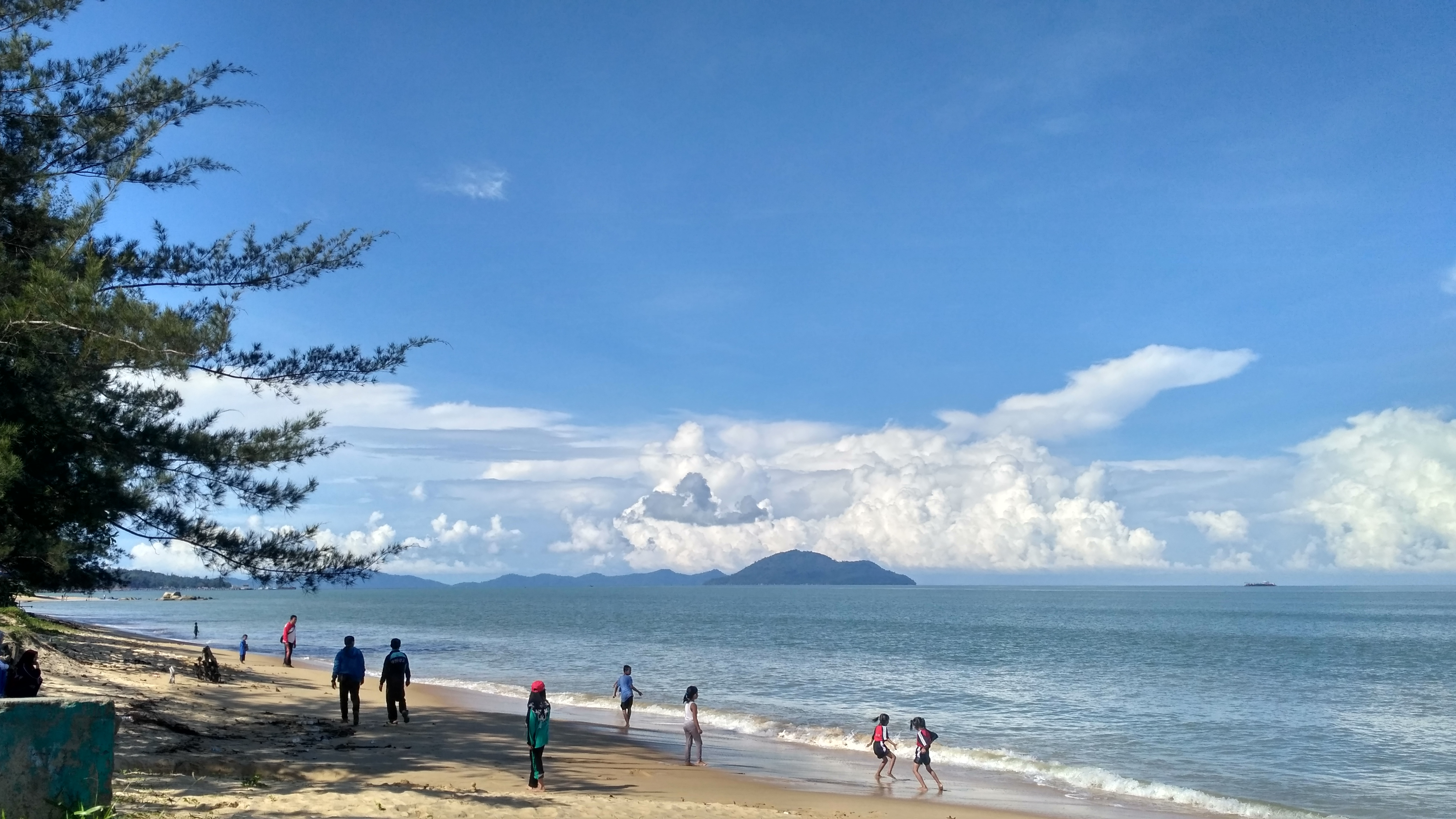
- Dragon statue in Singkawang city center Tri Dharma Bumi Raya buddhist temple Singkawang Malay traditional house Singkawang Grand Mosque Thai Pak Kung temple Pasir Panjang beach

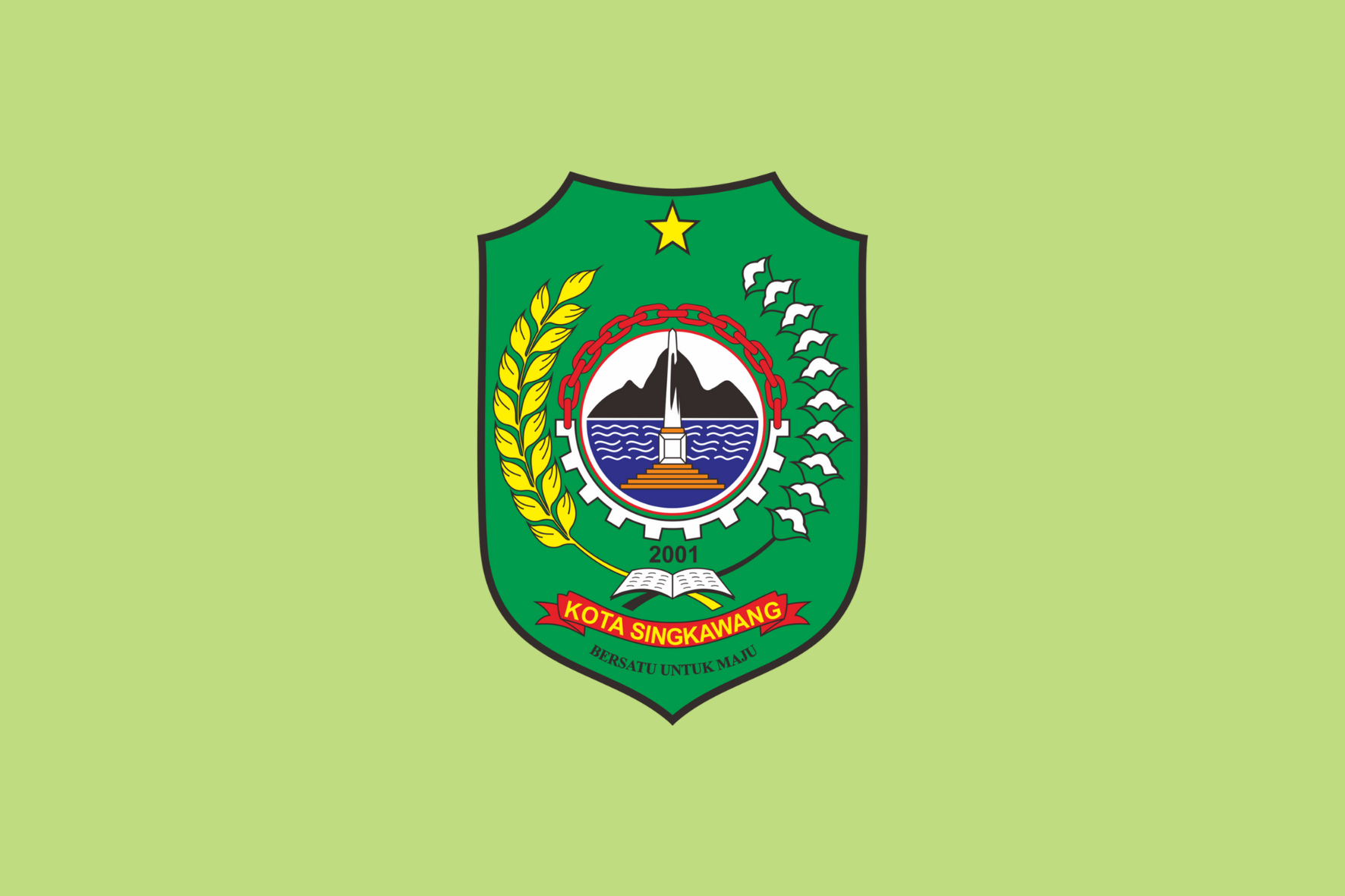
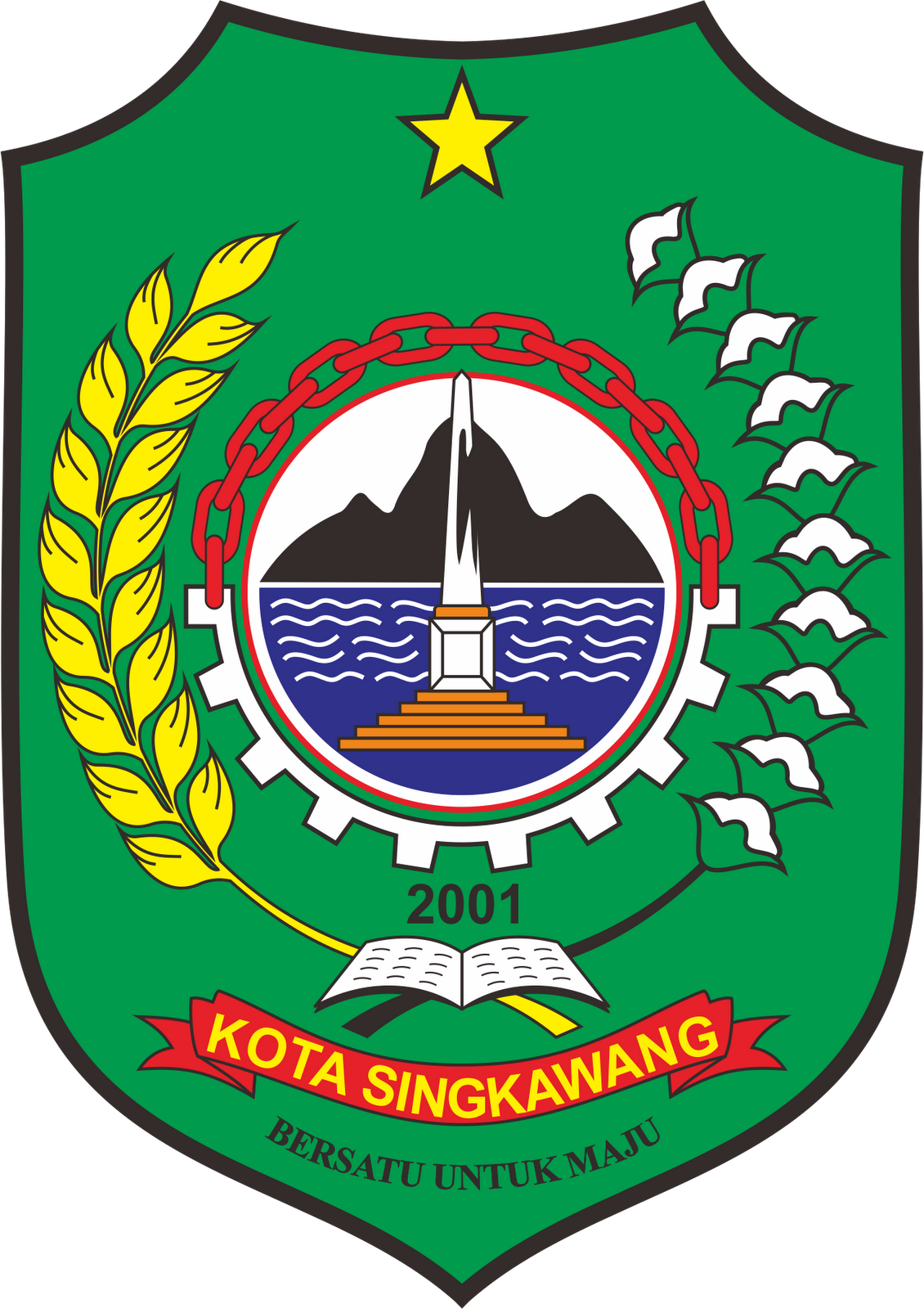
- Flag Coat of arms
- Nicknames: Kota Seribu Kelenteng "City of a Thousand Temples"; Kota Amoy "Amoy City"; Hong Kong van Borneo (Dutch) "Hong Kong of Borneo"
- Motto: Bersatu Untuk Maju, Singkawang Berkualitas "United to Progress, Quality Singkawang"
- Location within West Kalimantan

- Location in Kalimantan and Indonesia Singkawang (Indonesia)
- Coordinates: 0°54′N 108°59′E
- Country: Indonesia
- Province: West Kalimantan
- Established: 12 December 1981 (as administrative city); 21 June 2001

Government
  - Type: Mayor-council
  - Body: Singkawang City Government
  - Mayor: Tjhai Chui Mie (PDI-P)
  - Vice Mayor: Muhammadin
  - Legislature: Singkawang City Regional House of Representatives (DPRD)

Area
  - Total: 550.19 km^{2} (212.43 sq mi)

Population (mid 2025 estimate)
  - Total: 253,812
  - Density: 461.32/km^{2} (1,194.8/sq mi)
  - Demonym: Singkawangite 山口洋人 (Hakka) "San Khew Jong-Nyin"
- Time zone: UTC+7 (Indonesia Western Time)
- Area code: (+62) 562
- Website: singkawangkota.go.id

Singkawang

Chinese name
- Chinese: 山口洋
- Postal: Shankowyang
- Literal meaning: "Mount-Mouth-Sea" (Note: A city located at the foot of a mountain near the sea and has a river that flows up to the mouth of the river (estuary).)
Transcriptions
Standard Mandarin
- Hanyu Pinyin: Shānkǒuyáng
- Bopomofo: ㄕㄢ ㄎㄡˇ ㄧㄤˊ
- Gwoyeu Romatzyh: Shankoouyang
- Wade–Giles: Shan^{1}-kʻou^{3}-yang^{2}
- Tongyong Pinyin: Shan-kǒu-yáng
- IPA: [ʂán.kʰòʊ.jǎŋ]
other Mandarin
- Xiao'erjing: شًاكِوْيَانْ
- Dungan: Санкуён
- Sichuanese Pinyin: San^{1}kou^{3}yang^{2}
Wu
- Romanization: Se^{平} kheu^{去} yan^{去}
- Suzhounese: Se^{1} kheu^{3}-yan^{2}
Gan
- Romanization: San kieu iong
Xiang
- IPA: [san˧ kou˦˩ ian˩˧]
Hakka
- Romanization: San^{1}-kieu^{3}-yong^{2}
- Pha̍k-fa-sṳ: Sân-khiéu-yòng
Yue: Cantonese
- Yale Romanization: Sāanháuyèuhng
- Jyutping: Saan1 hau2 joeng4
- IPA: [san˥.hɐw˧˥.jœŋ˩]
Southern Min
- Hokkien POJ: Soaⁿ-kháu-iûⁿ
- Tâi-lô: Suann-kháu-iûnn
- Teochew Peng'im: Suan^{1}kao^{2}ion^{5}
Eastern Min
- Fuzhou BUC: Săng-kēu-iòng
Pu-Xian Min
- Hinghwa BUC: Sang-kâu-ió̤ng
Northern Min
- Jian'ou Romanized: Súing-kě-iô̤ng
Middle Chinese
- Middle Chinese: Srean khuw^{X} yang

Malay name
- Malay: Singkawang (Rumi) سيڠكاوڠ (Jawi)

Selako Dayak name
- Selako Dayak: Sakawokng (Latin)

Singkawang (Selako Dayak: Sakawokng), or San-Khew-Jong (Chinese: 山口洋; pinyin: Shānkǒuyáng; Pha̍k-fa-sṳ: Sân-gú-yòng), is a coastal city and port located in the province of West Kalimantan, on the island of Borneo in Indonesia. It is located at about 145 km north of Pontianak, the provincial capital, and is surrounded by the Pasi, Poteng, and Sakkok mountains. The name Singkawang is derived from the Salako language, which refers to a very wide area of swamps (all swamps). In addition, the ancestors of the Hakka Chinese community in Sakawokng also named this area in Hakka as "San-Khew-Jong" (Mount-Mouth-Sea), which means "A city located at the foot of a mountain near the sea and has a river that flows up to the mouth of the river (estuary)."

The city was created on 21 June 2001 by separation from Bengkayang Regency. It is bordered to the east and south by Bengkayang Regency, to the west by the South China Sea, and to the north by Sambas Regency. It covers an area of 550.19 km^{2} and had a population of 186,462 at the 2010 Census and 235,064 at the 2020 Census; the official estimate as at mid 2025 was 253,812 (comprising 129,606 males and 124,206 females).

== History ==
The name Singkawang (Chinese: 山口洋) came from the Hakka language: "San" (山), meaning mountain and forest, "Khew" (口) meaning the mouth of the river, and "Jong" (洋) meaning the sea. The miners and traders who came mostly from China, before they headed towards Monterado, first rested in Singkawang, while gold miners from Monterado often rested in Singkawang to remove their tiredness, while Singkawang also served as the transit point for the transportation of gold dust. At that time, they called it Sakawokng (Salakko Dayak language), which means a very wide swampy swamp area located on the beach. Dayak Salako are part of the soldiers and intelligence of the Sultanate of Sambas which was given territorial territory in Binua Sarauntung Sakawokng.

Basically the Salako Dayak tribe has long inhabited the Sakawokng area before it became a bustling trading area. The Hakka Chinese who came from South China, who were mostly farmers, traders, and gold miners at that time entered the Sakawokng area through small rivers in the Sado (Sedau) area. At first, the Singkawang area was still a vast wilderness filled with swamps. Due to its geographical location, the Hakka Chinese immigrants named this area in Hakka as "San Khew Jong" (山口洋).

These three syllables really describe the geographical location of Singkawang which is surrounded by mountains and adjacent to the sea and has a river that flows from upstream to downstream and empties into the mouth of the river (estuary). Coincidentally or not, the name San Khew Jong given by the Hakka Chinese immigrants has the same sound and meaning as the name Sakawokng, which was first named by the Salako Dayak ancestors. This shows that there has been a well-established interaction since time immemorial between the Chinese Hakka community and the indigenous Dayak Salako Sakawokng, especially in terms of language and culture.

Singkawang was previously the administrative centre of Sambas Regency under the status of Singkawang District. On 12 December 1981, Singkawang became an administrative city within that regency. On 27 April 1999, when Bengkayang Regency was established, Singkawang became part of that regency, while the administrative centre of Sambas Regency was moved back to Sambas from the city on 15 July. The city was formed as an autonomous city on 21 June 2001 by separation from Bengkayang Regency.

== Administrative districts ==
Prior to decentralization (in the time during which Singkawang was an administrative city within Sambas Regency) before it was established as an independent city in 2001, the city had three administrative districts, Roban, Pasiran and Tujuhbelas. These three districts were previously part of an undivided Singkawang District until 1981. In 2003, the districts were reorganized by splitting the Tujuhbelas District into three new districts (East Singkawang, North Singkawang and South Singkawang), while the residual districts of Roban and Pasiran were renamed as Central Singkawang and West Singkawang, respectively.

The city is divided into five administrative districts (kecamatan), listed below with their areas and their populations at the 2010 Census and the 2020 Census, together with the official estimates as at mid 2025. The table also includes the number of urban villages (kelurahan) in each district, and its post codes.

Kode Wilayah	Name of District (kecamatan)	Area in km^{2}	Pop'n Census 2010	Pop'n Census 2020	Pop'n Estimate mid 2025	No. of villages	Post code
61.72.05	Singkawang Selatan ^{(a)} (South Singkawang)	207.89	41,432	54,910	60,667	4	79163
61.72.03	Singkawang Timur (East Singkawang)	221.82	19,263	23,366	24,733	5	79251
61.72.04	Singkawang Utara (North Singkawang)	80.38	21,977	30,994	35,289	7	79151
61.72.02	Singkawang Barat (West Singkawang)	13.68	46,890	55,477	58,019	5	79121 - 79124
61.72.01	Singkawang Tengah (Central Singkawang)	26.41	56,900	70,317	75,104	6	79111 - 79116
	Totals	550.19	186,462	235,064	253,812	26	

Note: (a) including the offshore island of Pulau Simping.

== Climate ==
Singkawang has a tropical rainforest climate (Af) with heavy to very heavy rainfall year-round.

Climate data for Singkawang
Month	Jan	Feb	Mar	Apr	May	Jun	Jul	Aug	Sep	Oct	Nov	Dec	Year
Mean daily maximum °C (°F)	29.6 (85.3)	30.1 (86.2)	30.9 (87.6)	31.2 (88.2)	31.8 (89.2)	31.5 (88.7)	31.2 (88.2)	31.3 (88.3)	31.2 (88.2)	31.1 (88.0)	30.6 (87.1)	30.1 (86.2)	30.9 (87.6)
Daily mean °C (°F)	26.0 (78.8)	26.5 (79.7)	26.9 (80.4)	27.0 (80.6)	27.5 (81.5)	27.3 (81.1)	26.9 (80.4)	27.0 (80.6)	27.1 (80.8)	27.1 (80.8)	26.7 (80.1)	26.5 (79.7)	26.9 (80.4)
Mean daily minimum °C (°F)	22.5 (72.5)	23.0 (73.4)	22.9 (73.2)	22.9 (73.2)	23.2 (73.8)	23.1 (73.6)	22.7 (72.9)	22.8 (73.0)	23.0 (73.4)	23.1 (73.6)	22.9 (73.2)	22.9 (73.2)	22.9 (73.3)
Average rainfall mm (inches)	309 (12.2)	215 (8.5)	198 (7.8)	198 (7.8)	200 (7.9)	191 (7.5)	165 (6.5)	186 (7.3)	227 (8.9)	322 (12.7)	358 (14.1)	387 (15.2)	2,956 (116.4)
Source: Climate-Data.org

== Demographics ==
Ethnicities of Singkawang - 2000 Census
ethnic group	percent
Chinese	42%
Malay	30%
Dayak	10%
Javanese	10%
Madurese	5%
Other	3%

A plurality of the population is of Chinese descent (around 42% of whole population). The largest group of Chinese descent is Hakka people (locally called as "Hakka-nyin" who speak -the local Hakka dialect). The other major group of Chinese descent is Chaozhou People which is better known as Teochew. The rest are Malay, Dayak, Javanese, and other ethnicities. The total population was 235,064 at the 2020 Census, and reached 250,000 in mid 2024.

Religion in Singkawang (2022)
1. Islam (53.8%)
2. Buddhism (29.7%)
3. Roman catholic (7.91%)
4. Protestantism (5.21%)
5. Confucianism (2.64%)
6. Hinduism (0.30%)
7. Folk religion (0.10%)

The distribution of the religion practically follows the distribution of the ethnic groups; the largest groups are Islam followed by Buddhism, Catholic, Protestant and Confucianism.

== Food ==
Chinese food especially Hakka style dominates the food stalls or small restaurants, but Teochew style is also available. Minang style food can also be found here. Unique food like Rujak Ju Hie (鱿鱼炒; rojak with dried squid) is one of delicacies in Singkawang. Tofu (bean curd) Singkawang is famous in West Kalimantan, also Kembang Tahu (腐皮; silky smooth tofu with sugar gravy) is very popular in this city. Singkawang is also famous for its cakes. The variety of cakes is surprising and available from early morning till midnight. Choi Pan (菜粄:Steamed vegetable dumplings) is one of the many special traditional Chinese delicacies. Believed to be of Hakka origin, it consists mainly of fragrantly stir-fried yam bean wrapped in a slightly chewy translucent skin and is steamed to perfection. There are also have several Malay food such as Bubur Paddas (Malay's spicy porridge), Pedak (fermented shrimp paste) and Nasi Lemak. Kopi tiam with strong bitter robusta coffee can be found every where.

== Chinatown ==
Besides being well known as the City of Thousands Temples, as there are many small and large temples in any part of the Singkawang region, Singkawang is also known as one of the Indonesian Chinatowns since the majority of the population is of Chinese descent, consisting of mostly Hakka and some other sub-group of Han Chinese. They reside in all areas in the city. They still practice their culture in any ceremony or official events, from weddings to funeral ceremonies. The culture is seen as the closest to the original tradition of Chinese people (mostly refers to Hakka), making Singkawang known as the Indonesian Chinatown.

== Languages ==
Because over 70% of the population of this city is of Chinese Indonesian descent, most people in this city speak Chinese (Hakka). Singkawang people use Indonesian as the primary language in conversation or trading and also use their own mother tongue. As Singkawang consists of three major ethnic groups, Chinese, Malays and Dayaks, the majority of Singkawang people use either Indonesian or Hakka Chinese for conversation. The Indonesian used in Singkawang commonly for daily conversation is not standard Indonesian, but has some Malay influence on vocabulary as Malay is the closest language to Indonesian and the Singkawang people have for years been accustomed to Malay.

== Transportation ==
Recently, Singkawang has had their own airport, around 20 to 25 minutes from the centre. Singkawang is connected by road and can be reached by bus or taxi from Pontianak covering a distance of 150 km. It is also connected by road to Kuching in Malaysia via the Aruk/Biawak border and Sambas. A toll road to Pontianak is under consideration.

A new international airport, which will serve Singkawang and become an alternative for Pontianak airport, is under construction. It will be built in two phases, out of which the first phase is expected to be completed by the end of 2024.

== Festivals ==
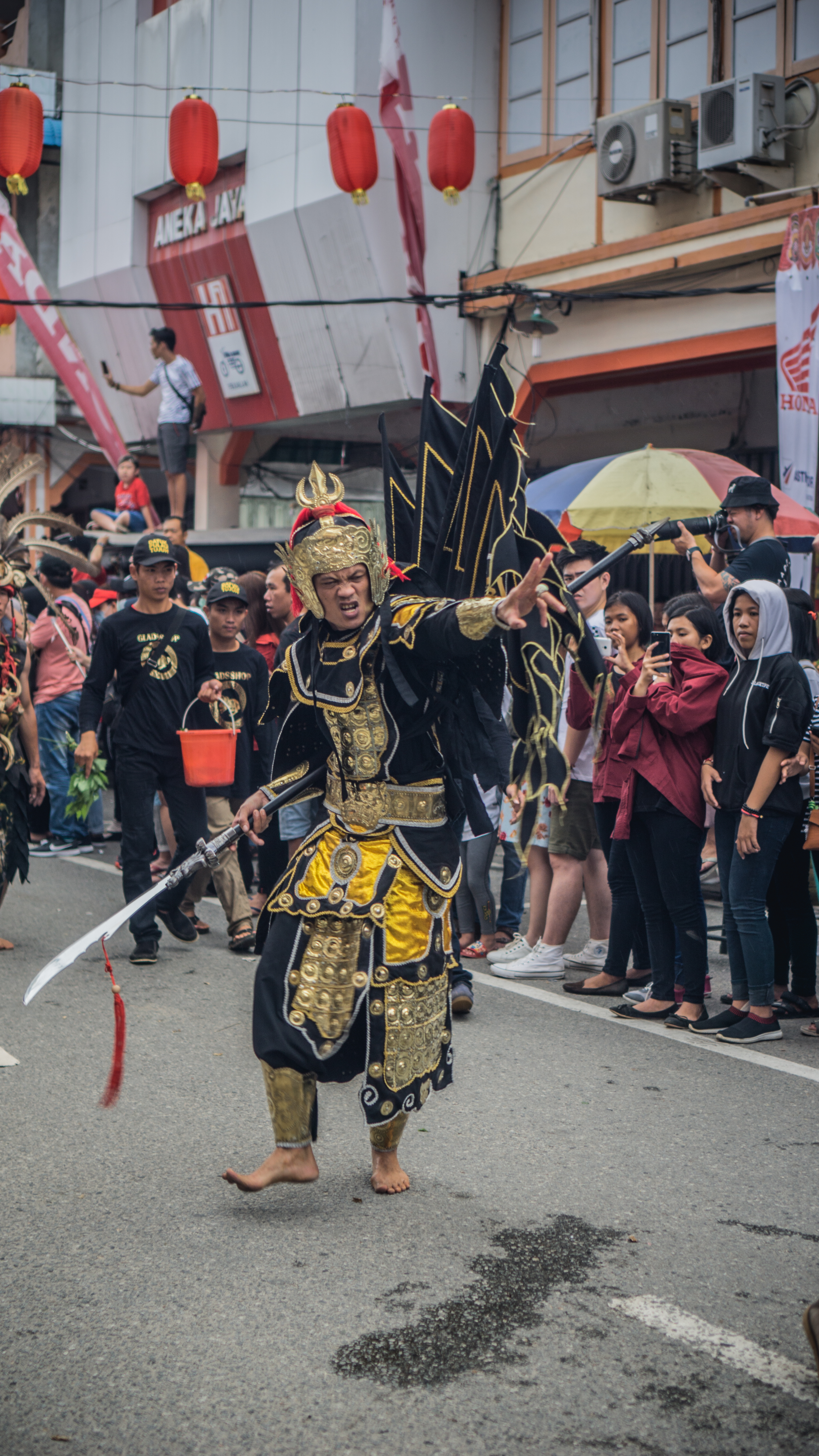
Cap Go Meh Festival in Singkawang, 2020

- Cap Go Meh (正月半 Jang Ngiet Ban in Hakka) is celebrated on the 15th and last day of Chinese New Year, the main spotlight of the day is Tatung (大同) festival, a mixed Chinese and Dayak people rituals;
- Qingming Festival or locally known as Cheng Beng, celebrated on 4–5 April in a given year;
- May: Gawai Dayak Naik Dango is celebrated by the Dayak in the opening of the rice harvest to thank the Gods;
- June 1: Ngabayotn is celebrated by the Dayak people to celebrate the closing form of rice harvest and beginning of the cultivation season;
- August: Wayang Gantung;
- August 17: The Celebration of Indonesian Independence day;
- October: Singkawang 10 km running contest is held on Singkawang's anniversary;
- October: Dragon Cup soccer championship gathers the clubs from the surrounding districts to celebrate Singkawang's anniversary;
- October: Pawai Takbir;
- Festival Bedug on Idul Adha day;
- Karnaval Muharram celebrates Islamic new year

== Around Singkawang ==
Places of interest around the city are:

- Simping Island, the smallest island in the world with an area of less than 0.5 hectares.
- Seran Tangan Lake, surrounded by shady trees give a fantastic impression and are very refreshing to the eye.
- Bukit Bougenville, a botanical garden about 6 km south of Singkawang;
- Chidayu Indah, is a similar garden to that of Bougenville, and lies right next to it;
- Sungai Hangmoy (坑門), a river used for bathing mainly by the Hakka population;
- Kawasan Wisata, a white sanded beach 8 km south of Singkawang;
- Teratai Indah, an artificial lake used for recreation by the locals; lies only 2 km south of Singkawang;
- Thai Pak Kung Temple (大伯公廟)
- Vihara Chikung (济公庙), the largest Taoist temple in the area, funded by Singaporeans, located 3 km south of the city;
- Gunung Roban, a mount with a tiled path up the mountain used by the locals for easy hiking; located 4 km to the east.
- Batu Belimbing, or Starfruit Rock, a rock that resembles a starfruit. lies 8 km east of the city;
- Gunung Poteng is one of the main water resources for the city, and lies 7 km east. The mountain is a Natural Reserve where unique flora such as the Rafflesia Tuan Mudae grows;
- Sinka Island Park location at south of Singkawang in Teluk Karang has access to small Simping Island, recreational park, swimming pool and mini zoo around a hill.
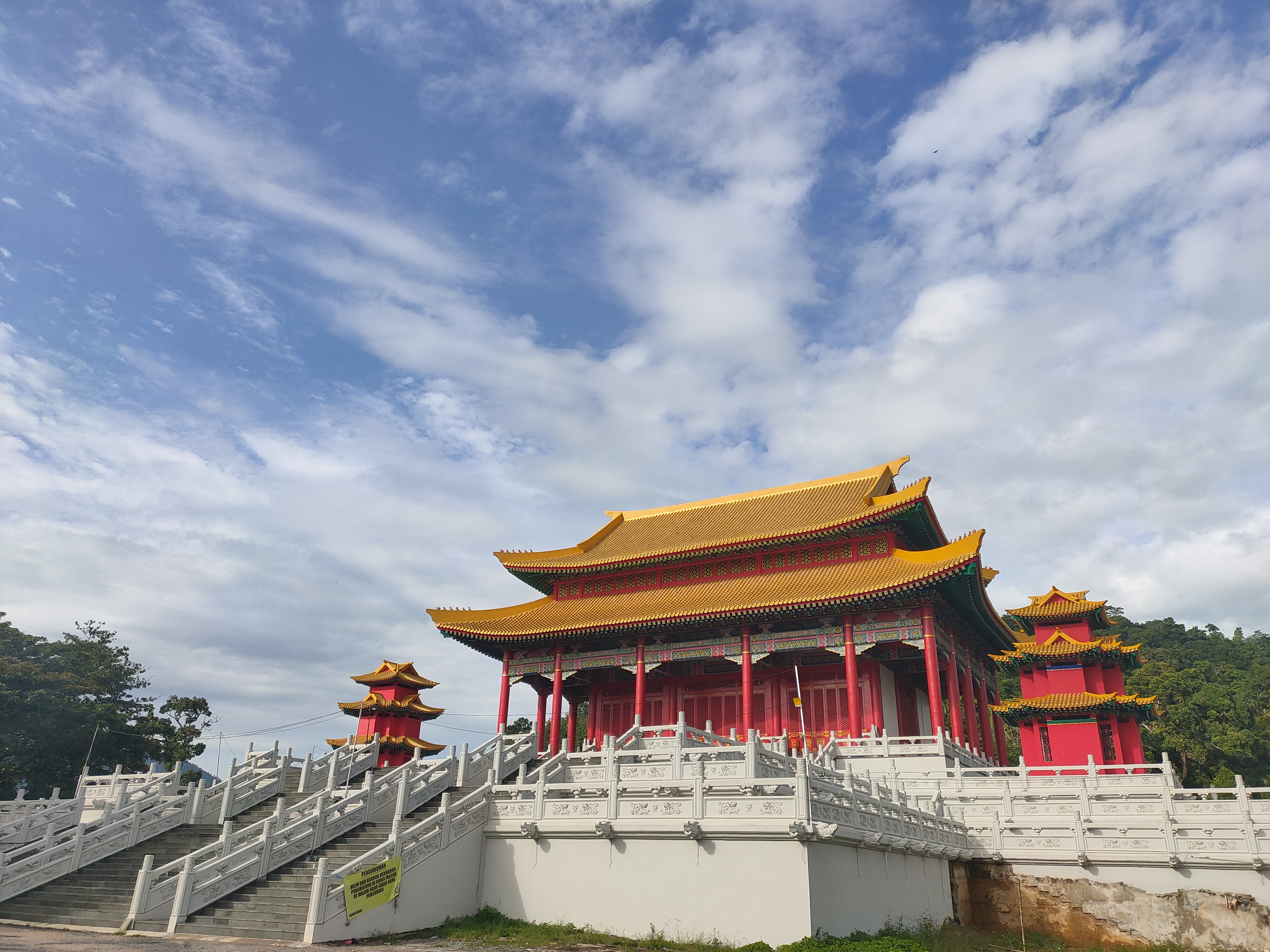
Thai Pak Kung Temple, the newly and largest temple in Singkawang

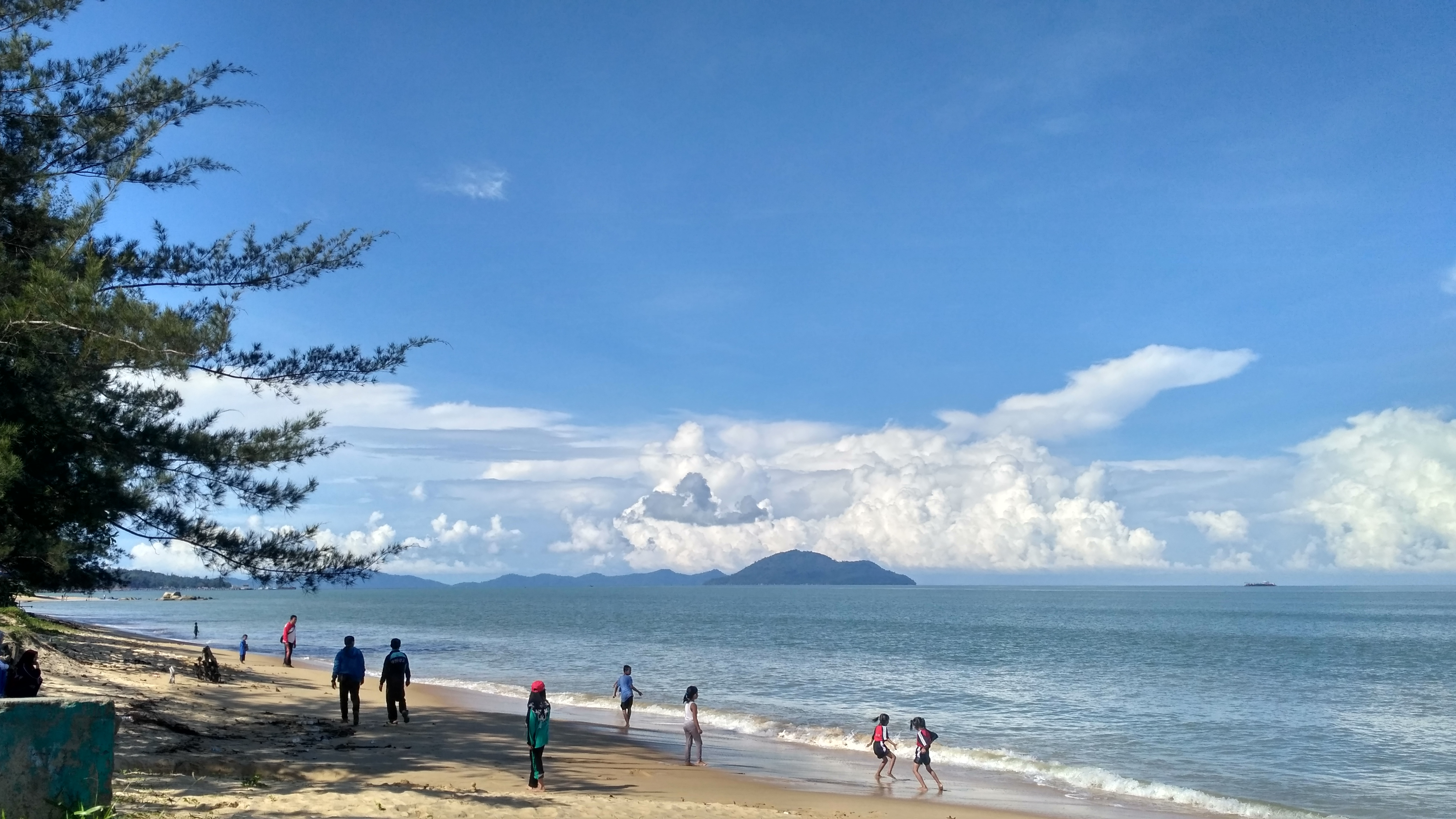
Pasir Panjang Beach

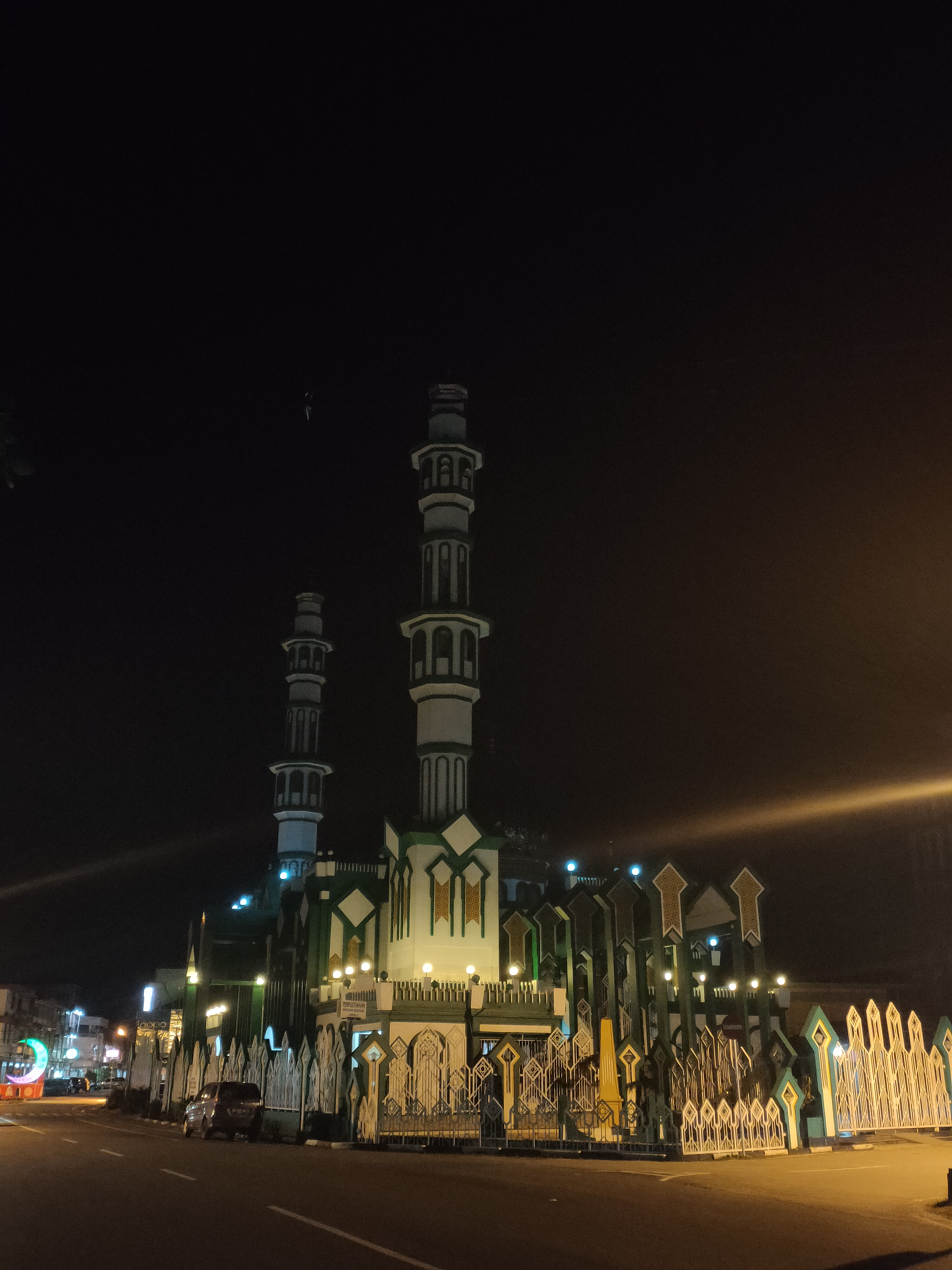
Singkawang Grand Mosque

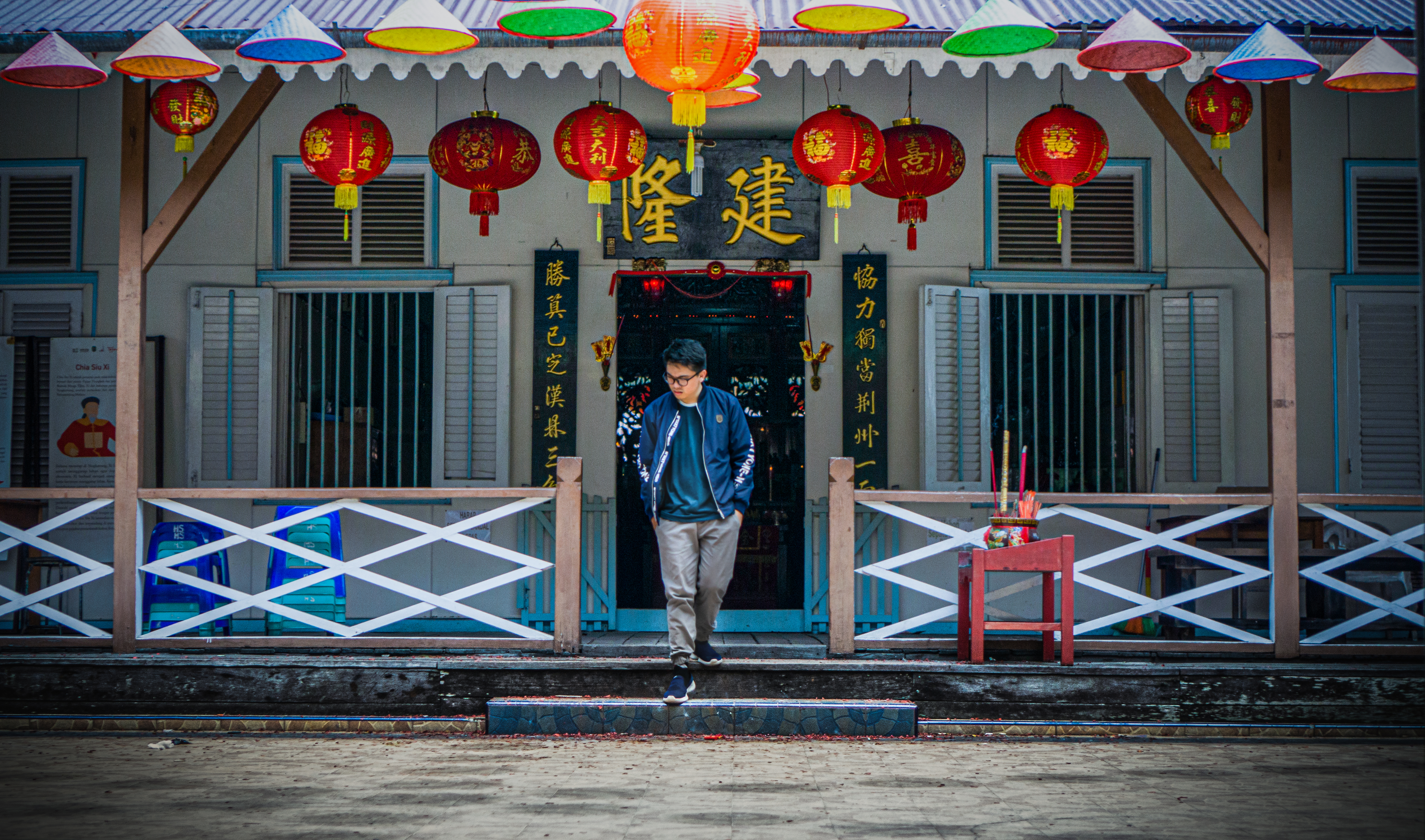
Tjhia ancestral house

== Mail order bride scandal ==
There have been allegations of human trafficking in Singkawang, based upon the town's mail order bride illegal business. Most of the men who travel to Singkawang looking for young women to marry are from Taiwan, Mainland China, or Singapore. These men arrive and get in touch with brokers, these brokers then approach families with suitably aged daughters and generally offers these parents about 6 million rupiahs (about US$450) for each girl.

It is most normal for a majority of these foreign clients to pay an amount exceedingly more than what is requested by the brokers and most payments are at an average of 30 million rupiahs (about US$2,250). Contracts are often drawn between the brokers and the clients. It is a fact that each contract includes a time period clause and most of these marriages are contractually bound for 2 to 4 years, some for even shorter periods of time. It is also common for these relationships to not be legally bound marriages.

Indonesian police actively arrest the offender of mail order bride.

== Sister cities ==
- Bintulu, Sarawak, Malaysia
- Kuching, Sarawak, Malaysia
- Miri, Sarawak, Malaysia
- Sibu, Sarawak, Malaysia
- Kangar, Perlis, Malaysia
- Singapore City, Singapore
- Fuzhou, China
- Gutian County, China
- Minjiang, China
- Matsu, Taiwan
- Yangmei District, Taiwan
- Newcastle upon Tyne, United Kingdom
- Yamaguchi, Japan
- Akita, Japan
- Pamplona, Spain
- Eureka, California, United States
- Nashik, India

== Notable people ==
- Morgan Oey, actor and singer, former member of Indonesian idol group SMASH
- Christiandy Sanjaya (黃漢山), Deputy Governor of West Kalimantan
