= Mualang language =

Ibanic Dayak language of Borneo

Mualang
- Mualang
- Native to: Indonesia
- Region: Kalimantan
- Ethnicity: Dayak Mualang
- Native speakers: 40,000 (2007)
- Language family: Austronesian: Malayo-Polynesian; Malayic; Ibanic; Mualang

Language codes
- ISO 639-3: mtd
- Glottolog: mual1241

Mualang is an Ibanic Dayak language of Borneo. It is mostly spoken by the Dayak Mualang in parts of the Sekadau Regency and Sintang Regency in Indonesia.
