= Bukar–Sadong language =

Austronesian language spoken in Borneo

Bukar–Sadong
- Bidayŭh Bukar-Sadung
- Native to: Malaysia, Indonesia
- Region: Borneo
- Native speakers: (49,000 in Malaysia cited 2000 census)
- Language family: Austronesian: Malayo-Polynesian; Land Dayak; Bidayuh; Bukar–Sadong

Language codes
- ISO 639-3: sdo
- Glottolog: buka1257

Bukar–Sadong is an Austronesian language mainly spoken by Bidayuh people in Sarawak but also in bordering regions of West Kalimantan, Indonesia. McGinn (2009) proposes that it is the closest relative of the divergent Rejang language of Sumatra.

== Phonology ==
Consonants
		Labial	Alveolar	Palatal	Velar	Glottal
Nasal		m	n	ɲ	ŋ	
Plosive	voiceless	p	t	c	k	ʔ
Plosive	voiced	b	d	ɟ	ɡ	
Fricative			s			h
Approximant		w	l	j		
Rhotic			r			

Vowels
	Front	Central	Back
Close	i	ɨ	u
Mid	e	ə	o
Open		a	
