= Dayak Mualang =

Mualang people Dayak Mualang
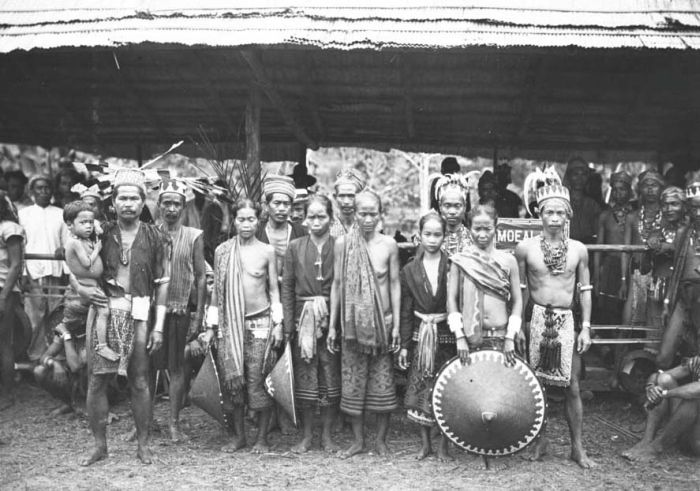
- A group of Mualang Dayaks during a visit to Governor-General J.P. Graaf of Limburg Stirum in Borneo, circa 1920.

Total population
- 44,400

Regions with significant populations
- Indonesia (West Kalimantan)

Languages
- Mualang language, Indonesian language

Religion
- Kaharingan (predominantly), Christianity

Related ethnic groups
- Iban people

Mualang (also Moealang or Dayak Mualang) are an indigenous people of West Kalimantan from the Dayak group and a sub-ethnic of the Iban people. They speak the Mualang language and they are mostly concentrated in areas in the Sekadau Regency and Sintang Regency of West Kalimantan, Indonesia. The specific districts where the Mualang people live include:

1. Belitang Hilir district, Sekadau
2. Belitang district, Sekadau
3. Belitang Hulu district, Sekadau
4. Sepauk, Sintang and its surrounding region

== Language ==
The Mualang language belongs to the Ibanic languages branch along with other Ibanic dialects such as Kantuk, Bugao, Desa, Seberuang, Ketungau and Sebaruk. These dialects mainly differ from one another in their pronunciations of specific phonemes. For example, words that end with "i" can be pronounced as "e" or "y" where "kediri" becomes "kedire", "rari" becomes "rare", "inai" becomes "inay", and "pulai" becomes "pulay". These words still carry the same meaning even though they are pronounced differently. These dialects also have some lexical variation between them.

== Culture ==
=== Traditional Folk Song ===
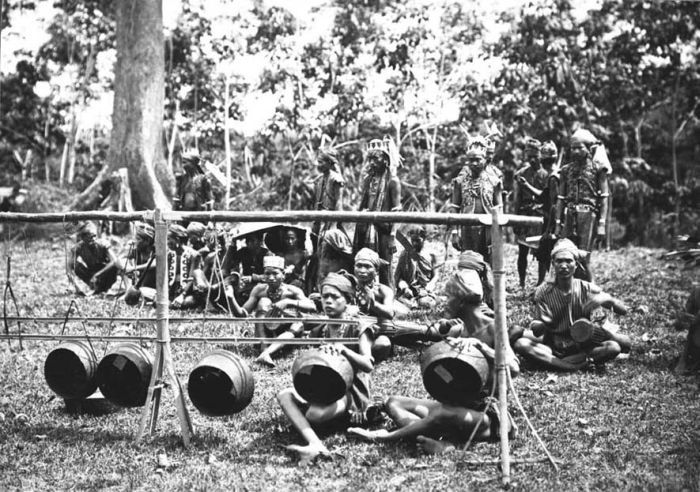
The Mualang Dayaks perform with musical instruments during the visit of Governor General Johan Paul van Limburg Stirum, circa 1920.

- Meh Bujang
- De Kutak Katik
- Aboh Beramay

=== Traditional Dance ===
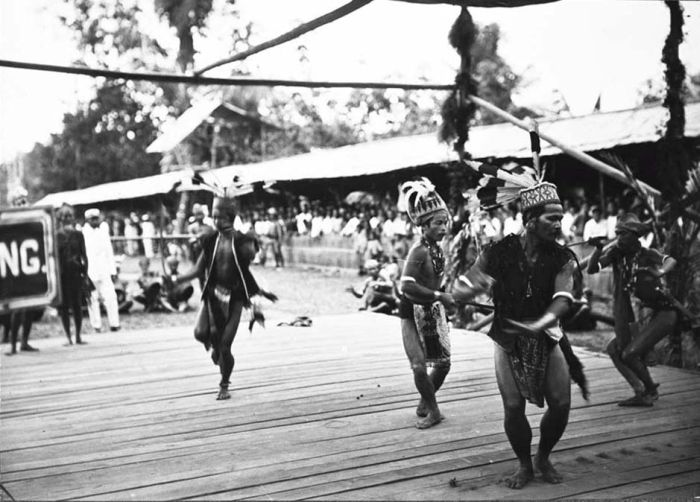
Traditional dance being performed by a group of Mualang Dayak men during the visit of Governor General Johan Paul van Limburg Stirum, circa 1920.

- Mualang Ngajad Kayau, a warrior dance
- Tari Pingan Mualang / Tari Pireng Mualang, found in Belitang Ilek, Belitang Tengah and Belitang Hulu
- Tari Pedang Mualang / Ngajat Bebunoh, a war dance performed by men found throughout Belitang Ilek (Merbang and its surrounding) and Belitang Hulu (Sebetung and its surrounding)
- Ajat Temuai Datai, loosely translated as "Welcoming Guest" dance performed by couples and it is found in Belitang Ilek, Belitung Tengah, Belitung Hulu and its surrounding region

=== Handicraft ===
- Kumpang Ilong weaving in Belitang Hulu district
