= Kendayan language =

Malayic Dayak language of Borneo

Kendayan
- Kanayatn, Salako
- Native to: Indonesia, Malaysia
- Region: Borneo
- Native speakers: 330,000 (2007)
- Language family: Austronesian: Malayo-Polynesian; Malayic; Kendayan
- Dialects: Belangin

Language codes
- ISO 639-3: knx
- Glottolog: kend1254

Kendayan, Kanayatn, or Salako (Selako), is a Malayic Dayak language of Borneo. The exact number of speakers remains unknown, but is estimated to be around 350,000.

The name Kendayan is preferred in Kalimantan, Indonesia, and Salako in Sarawak, Malaysia. It is sometimes referred to as bahasa Badameà, particularly in Bengkayang Regency and the areas near Singkawang City. Other dialects of Kendayan include Ahe, Banana and Belangin. Speakers of any of the dialects can understand speakers of any of the others.

== Language context ==
A speaker of Bedamea.

Salako is spoken in the state of Sarawak in Malaysia and the province of West Kalimantan in Indonesia. There are speakers in Sambas and Bengkayang Regencies and in Singkawang. Other dialects are spoken in the Pontianak, Bengkawang and Landak Regencies of West Kalimantan.

It is said that Singkawang in southern Sambas is the place of origin of Salako speakers.

Dialects spoken in West Kalimantan have been influenced by the Indonesian, which is the national language of Indonesia. This is the language used in official contexts, schools, the media and in church. In Sarawak, the influence of Malay has been less significant, as it became the national language more recently.

Kendayan is a vital language that is used in the community and at home. The Ahe variety is also spoken as a lingua franca by native speakers with Land Dayak groups. However, younger speakers are typically educated through Indonesian away from the villages, which could affect language vitality in the future.

== Comparison with other neighbouring languages ==
English	Malay-Indonesian	Kanayatn	Belangin/Balangin	Banjarese	Ngaju	Bakumpai
that	yang	nang	nang	nang	ijē	ji
old	tua	tuha	tua	tuha	bakas	bakas
people	orang	urakng	urak; uhak	urang	oloh	uluh
quiet (adjective)	diam/sunyi/senyap	diapm	diap	diam	Benyem/Tunis	
woman/female	perempuan	bini	mbini	bibini	bawi	bawi
hometown	kampung halaman	binua	binua	banua	lewun	lebu
face	muka	muha	muá	muha	baụ	
one	satu	asa	satu	asa	ijẹ	ije
two	dua	dua	dua	dua	due	due
three	tiga	talu	tege	talu	telo	telo
single (relationship status)	bujang	bujakng	bujak	bujangan	bujang/salia	
shy	malu	supantn'/supe	malu	supan	hamen/mahamen	
village	kampung	kampokng	kampong	kampung	lewu	
bride	pengantin	panganten	penganten	panganten	panganten	
bald	botak/gundul	pala'	botak	longor	borang	
stupid	bodoh	baga	mangkak; baga	bungul	mameh	
drunk	mabuk	kamabuk	mabu'k	mabuk	busau	
swimming	berenang	ngunanang	benanang; nyon'yong	bakunyung/bananang	hanangui	

== Sources ==
- Adelaar, K. Alexander (2005). Salako or Badamea: Sketch Grammar, Text and Lexicon of a Kanayatn Dialect in West Borneo. Frankfurter Forschungen zu Südostasien, volume 2. Wiesbaden: Harrassowitz.
