= Langkat Malay =

Malayic language spoken in Indonesia

- Bahase Melayu Langkat بهاس ملايو لڠكت
- Pronunciation: [ba.ha.sə mə.la.ju ˈlaŋ.kat]
- Native to: Indonesia (North Sumatra)
- Region: Langkat and Binjai
- Ethnicity: Langkat Malays
- Native speakers: (82,304 cited 1981 estimate)
- Language family: Austronesian: Malayo-Polynesian; (disputed); Malayic; Langkat Malay
- Dialects: Stabat; Tanjung Pura
- Writing system: Latin (Indonesian alphabet); Jawi

Language codes
- ISO 639-3: –
- Glottolog: None
- Regencies and cities in North Sumatra where Langkat Malay is spoken by a significant minority of the population

Langkat Malay (Langkat Malay: Bahase Melayu Langkat, Jawi: بهاس ملايو لڠكت) is a Malayic language primarily spoken by the Malay people living in Langkat Regency in the northernmost part of North Sumatra, Indonesia. Langkat Malay is closely related to other Malay varieties spoken along the eastern coast of Sumatra, including Deli Malay, Serdang Malay, and Tamiang Malay. Several ethnic groups reside in Langkat, including the Malays, Javanese, Banjarese, Batak, and Minangkabau. While the Malays are the indigenous people of Langkat, Javanese has become more widespread due to migration, as Javanese speakers now form the majority of the population. Despite this, Langkat Malay remains widely spoken in Langkat as the lingua franca and a common language for social interaction among residents. It coexists with other migrant languages such as Javanese, Banjar, and Orang Laut. As a result, some Malays can speak Javanese, Banjar, or Orang Laut, while many Javanese, Banjar, and Orang Laut speakers can also speak Langkat Malay.

The Malay people of Langkat use their language in both daily activities and traditional ceremonies. In everyday life, it serves a highly functional role, shaping various aspects of social interaction, including greetings, casual conversations on the street, visiting neighbors, chatting at the mosque before and after prayers, communicating during hunting in the forest, and other communal settings. Compared to its use as a daily communication tool, the use of Langkat Malay in traditional ceremonies exhibits a distinct pattern. This distinct pattern refers to variations that appear different from everyday usage. These variations primarily involve specific word choices or terms that are rarely used in other contexts. Nowadays, under the influence of Indonesian as the national language, many Langkat Malay speakers have begun to code-switch and code-mix between Langkat Malay and Indonesian. The language is currently under threat due to continued migration to Langkat from other parts of Indonesia such as Java, as well as a decline in fluency among Langkat Malays, especially among younger generations, who increasingly prefer to speak Indonesian.

== Classification ==
Langkat Malay is a Malayic language. Speakers of Malayic languages are spread from Brunei, Indonesia, Malaysia, Singapore, Southern Thailand, to the southernmost part of the Philippines. Malay is a member of the Austronesian family of languages, which includes languages from Taiwan, Southeast Asia, and the Pacific Ocean, with a smaller number in continental Asia. Malagasy, a geographic outlier spoken in Madagascar in the Indian Ocean, is also a member of this language family. Although these languages are not necessarily mutually intelligible to any extent, their similarities are often quite apparent. In more conservative languages like Malay, many roots have come with relatively little change from their common ancestor, Proto-Austronesian. There are many cognates found in the languages' words for kinship, health, body parts and common animals. Numbers, especially, show remarkable similarities.

Langkat Malay is closely related to other Malay varieties spoken along the eastern coast of North Sumatra, including Asahan Malay, Batubara Malay, Deli Malay, Serdang Malay, and Tamiang Malay. Collectively, these varieties are classified as the East Sumatran Malay group. The differences between these varieties primarily lie in their phonology and lexicon. Despite these differences, they share a high degree of similarity. For instance, it is estimated that 90% of the lexicon in Langkat Malay and Deli Malay overlaps. Langkat Malay is also closely related to Riau Malay, which is spoken in the Riau to the south of North Sumatra.

== Geographic distribution and usage ==
Langkat Malay is mainly spoken in Langkat Regency, located in the northernmost part of North Sumatra, as well as in the city of Binjai. The language is primarily spoken in areas with a significant Malay population, particularly in coastal regions such as Stabat and, most notably, Tanjung Pura, which serves as both the cultural center of the Malay people in Langkat and the royal seat of the Langkat Sultanate. In contrast, Batak languages, such as Karo, dominate the interior of the regency. Langkat Malay is typically used as a daily communication tool among the Malay community or in informal settings, whereas in formal situations, such as in schools or government institutions, Indonesian is the commonly used language. The use of standard Indonesian, which evolved from Johor-Riau Malay, in schools is believed to have begun around the same time as the establishment of government schools in Langkat Regency during the Dutch East Indies era in the early 20th century, when Johor-Riau Malay served as the lingua franca among native Indonesians. Because Indonesian is the national language, it is common for Langkat Malay speakers, especially younger generations, to code-switch or code-mix between Langkat Malay and Indonesian.

Langkat Malay, as one of the regional languages in Indonesia spoken specifically in North Sumatra, particularly in Langkat, serves as a means of communication, a cultural support, and a symbol of identity for the Langkat Malay community. In the Langkat Malay community, Langkat Malay is used for cultural and traditional purposes, including ceremonies and rituals as well as oral traditions such as local folklores and pantuns, which are traditional Malay poems. In these ceremonies, Langkat Malay plays a significant role. Traditional ceremonies include events such as marriage proposals, weddings, baby bathing rituals, housewarming ceremonies, rituals for blessing farmland, welcoming esteemed guests, and the adoption process. In religious ceremonies, unlike in other regions of Indonesia where regional languages play a significant role, Langkat Malay is not particularly prominent. For example, in West Java, sermons can be delivered in Sundanese alongside Arabic. However, this is not the case for Langkat Malay, which is rarely used in religious contexts. In formal religious events, such as mosque sermons, funeral rites, and marriage contracts, Indonesian is typically used alongside Arabic.

Although Malay is the indigenous language of Langkat, it is no longer spoken by the majority of the population. This shift is largely due to migration from other parts of Indonesia, particularly from Central and East Java, as Javanese migrants brought their native language with them. The transmigration program, which relocated people from Java to Sumatra, began during the Dutch colonial era and continued after Indonesia's independence. Today, the Javanese population in Langkat has surpassed the native Malay population, making Javanese the largest ethnic group in the regency. This has posed a threat to the use of Langkat Malay. Additionally, a language shift is occurring within the Langkat Malay community, particularly among younger generations, who increasingly prefer to speak standard Indonesian over Langkat Malay.

Langkat Malay has two known dialects: the Stabat dialect and the Tanjung Pura dialect. The Tanjung Pura dialect is considered the prestige variety, as Tanjung Pura serves as both the cultural center of the Langkat Malay community and the royal capital of the Langkat Sultanate.

== Phonology ==
Langkat Malay, like many other regional languages in Indonesia, lacks a standardized phonological system. Nevertheless, many of the phonological system designed for Langkat Malay is loosely based on standard Indonesian orthography, especially the system created by the Indonesian Ministry of Education, Culture, Research, and Technology.

=== Vowels ===
Like Indonesian and Standard Malay, Langkat Malay has six vowels. These vowels are /i/, /e/, /ə/, /a/, /u/, and /o/.

	Front	Central	Back
Close	i		u
Mid	e	ə	o
Open		a	

Notes:

- In writing, /e/ and /ə/ are both represented as ⟨e⟩.

=== Consonants ===
Langkat Malay has 20 consonants.

		Labial	Labiodental	Alveolar	Postalveolar	Palatal	Uvular	Velar	Glottal
Nasal		m		n	ɲ			ŋ	
Plosive/ Affricate	voiceless	p		t	t͡ʃ			k	ʔ
Plosive/ Affricate	voiced	b		d	d͡ʒ			ɡ	
Fricative	voiceless		f	s					h
Fricative	voiced								
Approximant		w		l		j			
Trill							ʀ̥		

Notes: In writing, the following phonemes are represented as thus:

- /ŋ/ is ⟨ng⟩
- /ɲ/ is ⟨ny⟩
- /t͡ʃ/ is ⟨c⟩
- /d͡ʒ/ is ⟨j⟩
- /ʔ/ is ⟨k⟩
- /j/ is ⟨y⟩
- /ʀ̥/ is ⟨r⟩

=== Diphthongs ===
Langkat Malay has 10 diphthongs. The following examples illustrate their usage:

- /ia/: alia 'ginger', derian 'durian'
- /iu/: tiup 'to blow', piut 'great-great-grandchild'
- /ee/: peel 'behavior'
- /ai/: kain 'cloth', dain 'salted fish'
- /ae/: kaet 'to link', jaet 'to sew'
- /aa/: saat 'moment', faal 'physiology'
- /ao/: paot 'to hang', daon 'leaf'
- /ui/: kuit 'to touch', duit 'money'
- /ue/: kueh 'cake'
- /ua/: kuari 'window', lengkuas 'blue ginger'

== Grammar ==
Along with Indonesian, standard Malay, and other Malayic languages, the word order in Langkat Malay is typically subject-verb-object (SVO). While there are notable exceptions, the grammar structure of Langkat Malay shares many similarities with Indonesian and Standard Malay.

=== Affixes ===
The affixes found in Langkat Malay are of four types: prefixes, suffixes, circumfixes, and compound affixes. The table below presents a list of some examples of affixes used in Langkat Malay, along with their allomorphs, meanings, and examples:

Type of affixes	Affixes	Allomorphs	Functions and meanings	Example of basic word	Example of derived word
Prefixes	N-	m-, n-, ny-, ng-	Used to form verbs. It denotes the meaning 'to perform a task with....' when combined with a noun and 'to perform a task' when combined with a verb.	sapu 'broom'	nyapu 'to sweep'
Prefixes	ber-	be-, ber-	Used to form verbs. It conveys the meaning of 'having something' when combined with a noun, 'performing an action' when combined with a verb, and 'totaling ... together' when combined with a numeral.	rumah 'house'	berumah 'to have a house'
Prefixes	peN-	pem-, pen-, peng-, peny-, pe-	Used to form nouns. It forms the meaning of 'a person who performs a task' or 'a tool for...' when combined with a noun or a verb.	curi 'to steal'	penyuri 'stealer'
Prefixes	ter-	–	Used to form verbs or adjectives. It conveys the meaning of 'doing a task unintentionally or being able to be ...' when combined with a verb and 'most' when combined with an adjective.	tinggi 'tall'	tetinggi 'tallest'
Prefixes	se-	none	Used to form numerals or adjectives. It conveys the meaning of 'one' when combined with a numeral and 'expressing similarity' when combined with an adjective.	burok 'bad'	seburok 'as bad as'
Prefixes	di-	none	Used to form verbs. It conveys the meaning of 'performing an action using the object mentioned in the root word' when combined with a noun and 'performing an action as described by the root word' when combined with a verb.	lutar 'to throw'	dilutar 'to be thrown'
Suffixes	-i	none	Used to form verbs. It conveys the meaning of 'performing an action using..., giving, or removing what is mentioned in the root word to or from its object' when combined with a noun, 'expressing a repetitive action' when combined with a verb, and 'forming a causative meaning' when combined with an adjective.	garam 'salt'	garami 'to add salt to something'
Suffixes	-ka	none	Used to form verbs. It conveys the meaning of 'an action described by the root word being performed for someone else' when combined with a verb and 'forming a causative meaning' when combined with a verb, adjective or a numeral.	tanak 'to cook'	tanakka 'to cook something for someone'
Suffixes	-an	none	Used to form nouns or adjectives. It conveys the meaning of 'that which is ...' when combined with a verb and 'more' when combined with an adjective.	panjang 'long'	panjangan 'longer'
Circumfixes	ke-...-an	none	Used to form nouns. It conveys the meaning of 'indicating location' when combined with a noun and 'experiencing or suffering from' or 'indicating excess' when combined with an adjective.	sejok 'cold'	kesejokan 'coldness'
Circumfixes	ber-...-an	be-, ber-	Used to form verbs. It conveys the meaning of 'mutual action' or 'an action performed by many subjects at the same time' when combined with a verb and 'many that are ...' when combined with an adjective.	taok 'to call'	betaokan 'to call one another'
Circumfixes	per-...-an	pe-, per-	Used to form nouns. It conveys the meaning of 'a place where something is done' when combined with a noun, 'an object related to the action described by the root word' when combined with a verb, and 'having the characteristic described by the root word' when combined with an adjective.	cakap 'to talk'	pecakapan 'conversation'
Circumfixes	peN-...-an	pem-, pen-, peng-, peny-, pe-	Used to form nouns. It conveys the meaning of 'a method or way' when combined with a noun or a verb.	dapat 'to earn'	pendapatan 'earnings'
Compound affixes	N-...-ka	m-, n-, ny-, ng-	Used to form verbs. It conveys the meaning of 'performing an action as described by the root word' when combined with a noun or a verb.	laboh 'to fall'	ngelabohka 'to make something fall'
Compound affixes	N-...-i	m-, n-, ny-, ng-	Used to form verbs. It conveys the meaning of 'giving or removing something to or from its object' when combined with a noun, 'performing an action repeatedly, continuously, or involving many doers' when combined with a verb, 'giving something to its object' when combined with an adjective, and 'expressing competition' when combined with a numeral.	aer 'water'	ngaeri 'to pour water to something'
Compound affixes	di-...-ka	none	Used to form verbs. It conveys the meaning of 'performing an action as described by the root word' when combined with a verb or an adjective.	betol 'straight'	dibetolka 'to be straighten'
Compound affixes	di-...-kena	none	Used to form verbs. It conveys the meaning of 'performing an action using ...' when combined with a noun and 'performing an action as described by the root word' when combined with a verb.	jala 'net'	dijalakena 'using a net to perform a task'
Compound affixes	ter-...-ka	te-, ter-	Used to form verbs. It conveys the meaning of 'an action done unintentionally or something that can be done' when combined with a noun and 'an action that can be done or is unintentionally performed for someone else' when combined with a verb.	pikir 'to think'	tepikirka 'accidentally or spontaneously thought of'
Compound affixes	ter-...-i	te-, ter-	Used to form verbs. It conveys the meaning of 'something that can be given to or removed from an object' when combined with a noun, 'an action that can be performed or is unintentionally repeated' when combined with a verb, and 'something that can be applied to an object' when combined with an adjective.	pukul 'to hit'	tepukuli 'to be hit'

=== Reduplication ===
In Langkat Malay, as in other Malay varieties, reduplication can also be found. The representation of these reduplicated words can be analyzed from various aspects. Reduplication in Langkat Malay has two forms: base-form reduplication and affixed-form reduplication. Reduplication can also be divided into two types: full reduplication, where the entire word is repeated, and partial reduplication, where only a part of the word is repeated. It has several functions, such as forming nouns, verbs and adjectives. In Langkat Malay, reduplication has several meanings, such as indicating plurality, expressing repeated actions, denoting reciprocal actions, describing a state or characteristic of the root word, and indicating collectivity.

Examples of base-form reduplication are shown below:

- lumbung 'granary' → lumbung-lumbung 'granaries'
- lagak 'pretty' → lagak-lagak 'pretty-pretty'
- kuari 'window' → kuari-kuari 'windows'

Examples of affixed-form reduplication are shown below:

- lari 'to run' → belari-lari 'to run back and forth'
- taba 'to laugh' → betaba-taba 'to laugh repeatedly or continuously'
- ujan 'rain' → berujan-ujan 'to play in the rain continuously'

=== Nouns ===
Some characteristics of nouns in Langkat Malay include the ability to take affixes such as peN-, peN-...-an, per-...-an, -an, and ke-...-an. They can also be pluralized through reduplication and, if referring to a person or a proper name, can be replaced with ia ‘he/she’ or orang ‘they’. The characteristics of nouns that can be affixed are shown in the following examples:

- peN-...-an + jaga 'to guard' → penjagaan 'guarding'
- minum 'to drink' + -an → minuman 'drinks'
- ke-...-an + kecit 'small' → kekecitan 'smallness'

Examples of nouns that can be pluralized through reduplication are shown below:

- seluar 'pants' → seluar-seluar 'multiple pants'
- buah 'fruits' → buah-buah 'fruits'
- kating 'basket' → 'kating-kating 'baskets'

In Langkat Malay, ia 'he/she' and orang 'they' are used when a noun refers to a person or proper name. For example:

- Si Udin so lalu ke pekan 'Si Udin has gone to the market.'
- Ia so lalu ke pekan 'He/she has gone to the market.'
- Abang dan kakak mbuat rumah 'Brother and sister are building a house.'
- Orang yo mbuat rumah 'They are building a house.'

There are four types of nouns in Langkat Malay:

(a) Nouns that can be quantified with buah '(classifier for things)':

- due buah derian 'two durians'

(b) Nouns that can be quantified with ekor 'tail/(classifier for animals)':

- tige ekor ikan 'three fishes'

(c) Nouns that can be quantified with orang 'person':

- lime orang pendudok 'five locals'

(d) Nouns that cannot be quantified:

- kecerditan 'smartness'

=== Verbs ===
Verbs in Langkat Malay can take various affixes, including N-, ber-, ber-...-an, -ka, -i, N-...-ka, N-...-i, ter-...-i, and ter-...-ka. They can also be passivized using the affixes di-, di-...-ka, and di-...-kena. For example:

- selok 'to wear' + -ka → selokka 'to wear someone'
- N- + bawa 'to bring' + -ka → mbawaka 'to bring something'
- ter- + angat 'hot' + -i → terangati 'to get heated by accident'

Verbs in Langkat Malay can be classified into two types: verbs that can be followed by a noun phrase (transitive verbs) and verbs that cannot be followed by a noun phrase (intransitive verbs).

Examples of transitive verbs are shown below:

- mbeli seleper 'buying sandals'
- ngelutar mangga 'throwing a mango'
- nonggak unggas 'catching birds'
- mbuat kepoh ayam 'building a chicken coop'
- mbeli seleper akak 'buying sister’s sandals'
- ngelatahi akar lalang 'removing wild grass roots'

Examples of intransitive verbs are shown below:

- nari 'dancing'
- belari 'running'
- nangis 'crying'

=== Adjectives ===
Adjectives in Langkat Malay have several characteristics: they can follow a noun, be preceded by paling ‘most,’ take the suffix -an, and be followed by kali, bena, or botol, all of which mean ‘very' or 'truly'.

Examples of adjectives that can be followed by a noun are shown below:

- kabar menday 'good news'
- rumah burok 'bad house'
- kelamber tuha 'old coconut'

Examples of adjectives that can be preceded by paling are shown below:

- paling besar 'biggest'
- paling kecil 'smallest'
- paling tinggi 'tallest'

Examples of adjectives that can be affixed with -an are shown below:

- besar + -an → besaran 'bigger'
- itam + -an → itaman 'blacker'
- manis + -an → manisan 'sweeter'

Examples of adjectives that can be followed by kali, bena, and botol are shown below:

- sikit kali 'very little'
- paet kali 'very bitter'
- lantam kali 'very arrogant'
- ajab bena 'very difficult'
- puteh bena 'very white'
- besar botol 'truly big'
- berani botol 'truly brave'
- pandak botol 'truly short'

=== Numerals ===
The characteristics of numerals in Langkat Malay are that they can only be directly followed by a noun or a noun phrase. Numerals in Langkat Malay can be classified into three types: definite numerals, indefinite numerals, and ordinal numerals. Definite numerals specify an exact number. For example:

- satu 'one'
- due 'two'
- tige 'three'
- empat 'four'

Indefinite numerals indicate an unspecified quantity. For example:

- semue 'all'
- sebelah 'half'
- banyak 'many'
- sikit 'few'

Ordinal numerals indicate order or ranking. For example:

- kedue 'second'
- kelime 'fifth'
- kelapan 'eighth'
- kesebelas 'eleventh'

=== Particles ===
Particles in Langkat Malay have several characteristics: they cannot take affixes and can appear before or after nouns, verbs, adjectives, and numerals. Examples of particles that cannot be affixed are shown below:

- ndak 'no'
- tengah 'currently'
- belom 'not yet'
- so, sudah 'already'
- te 'not'
- kat 'to, at'

Examples of particles that can be followed or preceded by other words are shown below:

- dari pekan → 'from the market'
- di laot → 'at sea'
- kat abah → 'to father'
- ke rumah → 'to home'
- so lalu → 'already gone'
- belom tidur → 'not yet asleep'
- tengah anggat-anggat → 'currently warm'
- lagak kali → 'very beautiful'
- ampir seratus → 'almost one hundred'
- te mati → 'not dead'

== Vocabulary ==
Langkat Malay features a distinctive lexicon, with many words not found in other Malay varieties. Like other Malay dialects, it has absorbed loanwords from foreign languages, particularly Arabic, due to the strong influence of Islam among the Langkat Malay people. One example is abah ‘father,’ borrowed from Arabic abā (أَبَاً).In addition to Arabic, Langkat Malay has also incorporated a significant number of words from standard Indonesian, the national language of Indonesia, which is taught in schools and used in official settings such as government institutions. However, traditional Langkat Malay vocabulary is increasingly under threat as Indonesian equivalents replace native terms. This shift is especially noticeable among younger generations, leading to a gradual decline in familiarity with their linguistic heritage.

Below are examples of commonly used Langkat Malay vocabulary along with their Indonesian and English translations:

=== Numerals ===
Number	Langkat Malay	Indonesian	English
1	satu	satu	one
2	due	dua	two
3	tige	tiga	three
4	mpat	empat	four
5	lime	lima	five
6	enam	enam	six
7	tujoh	tujuh	seven
8	lapan	delapan	eight
9	sembilan	sembilan	nine
10	sepuloh	sepuluh	ten
11	sebelas	sebelas	eleven
20	due puloh	dua puluh	twenty
50	lime puloh	lima puluh	fifty
100	seratus	seratus	one hundred
500	lima ratus	lima ratus	five hundred
1000	seribu	seribu	one thousand
5000	lime ribu	lima ribu	five thousand
100,000	seratus ribu	seratus ribu	one hundred thousand
1,000,000	sejute, satu jute	sejuta, satu juta	one million

=== Directions ===
Langkat Malay	Indonesian	English
nin, nen	ini	this
nun, yo	itu	that
sini	sini	here
sian	situ	there (close)
sana	sana	there (far)
disini, tang sini	disini	over here
disian, tang sian	disitu	over there (close)
disana, tang sana	disana	over there (far)
kiri	kiri	left
kanan	kanan	right
atas	atas	up
bawah	bawah	down
utare	utara	north
selatan	selatan	south
timor	timur	east
barat	barat	west

=== Personal Pronouns ===
Langkat Malay	Indonesian	English
aku, amba	aku, saya	I, me
kelian, kamu engko, ko	kamu, engkau	you (informal)
ia	dia	he/she
kami	kami	we (exclusive)
kite	kita	we (inclusive)
orang, mereke	mereka	they/them

=== Interrogatives Pronouns ===
Langkat Malay	Indonesian	English
sape	siapa	who
maya	apa	what
ngape	kenapa, mengapa	why
tang mane, di mane	mana, dimana	where
bile	kapan	when
bagaimane	gimana, bagaimana	how
berape	berapa	how much
mengkale	bila, apabila, kalau	if

=== Nouns ===
Langkat Malay	Indonesian	English
aer	air	water
pokok	pohon	tree
sungai, sei	sungai	river
laot	laut	sea
utan	hutan	forest
pantai	pantai	beach
laki	pria, laki-laki	man
mpuan	wanita, perempuan	woman
tanah	tanah	land, ground, soil
gunong	gunung	mountain
paser	pasir	sand
rumput	rumput	grass
jalan	jalan	road
kude	kuda	horse
anjing	anjing	dog
anak, budak	anak	child, kid
motor	mobil	car
daon	daun	leaf
kulit	kulit	skin
ekor	ekor	tail
telinge	telinga	ear
kepale	kepala	head
leher	leher	neck
ati	hati	heart
mulut	mulut	mouth
idong	hidung	nose
tingkap	jendela	window
pintu	pintu	door

=== Verbs ===
Langkat Malay	Indonesian	English
makan	makan	eat
minum	minum	drink
lari	lari	run
cakap	bicara	to talk
nesah	basuh, cuci	wash
kerja	kerja	to work
bediri	berdiri	to stand
gambar	gambar	to draw (a picture)
terbang	terbang	to fly
keleh	lihat, tengok	see
dengar	dengar	listen
bayar	bayar	pay
bemaen	bermain	to play
ambel	ambil	take
beli	beli	buy
bangket	bangun	to wake up
tidur	tidur	to sleep
pegi	pergi	to go
bagi, kasih	beri, kasih	to give
buni	sembunyi	to hide
ndak	mau	to want

=== Adjectives ===
Langkat Malay	Indonesian	English
meskin	miskin	poor
kaye	kaya	rich
mendai	bagus, baik	good
burok	buruk	bad
lebar	lebar	wide
sempit	sempit	narrow
lagak	cantik	pretty
sedih	sedih	sad
besar	besar, gede	big, large
kecit	kecil	small
angat	panas	hot
sejok	dingin, sejuk	cold
paet	pahit	bitter
manis	manis	sweet
masin	asin	salty
gelap	gelap	dark
berat	berat	heavy
kering	kering	dry
lama	lama	long (time), old
baru	baru	new
lapar	lapar	hungry
aus	haus	thirsty
pedeh	sakit	sick
bersih	bersih	clean
kotor	kotor	dirty
jelak	bosan	bored
banyak	banyak	many
sikit	sedikit	little

== Writing system ==
Like many other Malayic languages, Langkat Malay was historically written in the Jawi script, also known as Arab-Melayu or Pegon. In the Langkat Sultanate, Jawi, a script derived from Arabic and introduced by Arab traders, was widely used for both daily communication and official affairs. The prominence of Jawi script grew alongside the rapid expansion of the Malay language, which became a lingua franca across the Malay Archipelago during the 15th and 16th centuries. During this period, numerous Islamic sultanates in the Malay Archipelago, including Aceh, Serdang, Langkat, Deli, Tanjung Pura, Siak, Jambi, Riau-Lingga, Palembang, and others, adopted Jawi as the official script of their administrations. Jawi was historically used in Langkat to record traditional literatures, such as religious inscriptions, Islamic manuscripts and other works. However, with the introduction of the Latin script during European colonization, the use of the Jawi script in Langkat and other regions declined significantly, eventually becoming almost nonexistent in daily communication. Today, the use of Jawi in Langkat is highly limited and is mostly preserved in Islamic boarding schools, where students learn Jawi calligraphy for Quranic recitations.

== See also ==
- Langkat Regency
- Sultanate of Langkat
- Deli Malay
- Tamiang Malay

== Bibliography ==
- Masindan; Sinar, T. Silvana; Zulkiffi; Muchtar, Muhizar; Harahap, Oliviana (1985). Kamus Melayu Langkat-Indonesia [Langkat Malay-Indonesian Dictionary] (PDF) (in Indonesian). Jakarta: Agency for Language Development and Cultivation.
- Masindan; Bakar, Abu; Sembiring, Matius C.A.; Sinar, T. Silvana (1987). Sastra Lisan Melayu Langkat [Oral Literature of Langkat Malay] (PDF) (in Indonesian). Jakarta: Agency for Language Development and Cultivation.
- Noor, Yusmaniar; Silitonga, Mangasa; Usman, Burhanuddin Ch.; Sihotang, Nasahon (1985). Struktur Bahasa Melayu Langkat [Structure of Langkat Malay] (PDF) (in Indonesian). Jakarta: Agency for Language Development and Cultivation.
- Zulkifli; S., Anni Krisna; Noor, Yusmaniar; Hasan, Syaid (1986). Kata Tugas Bahasa Melayu Langkat [Function Words in the Langkat Malay] (PDF) (in Indonesian). Jakarta: Agency for Language Development and Cultivation.
