= Serdang Malay =

Malayic language of North Sumatra

- Bahase Melayu Serdang بهاسي ملايو سردڠ
- Pronunciation: [ba.ha.sə mə.la.ju sər.daŋ]
- Native to: Indonesia (North Sumatra)
- Region: Deli Serdang, Serdang Bedagai, and Tebing Tinggi
- Ethnicity: Serdang Malays
- Native speakers: (136,930 cited 1991 estimate)
- Language family: Austronesian: Malayo-Polynesian; (disputed); Malayic; Serdang Malay
- Dialects: Lubuk Pakam; Pantai Cermin; Perbaungan; Tanjung Beringin; Teluk Mengkudu
- Writing system: Latin (Indonesian alphabet); Jawi

Language codes
- ISO 639-3: –
- Glottolog: None
- Regencies and cities in North Sumatra where Serdang Malay is spoken by a significant minority of the population

Serdang Malay (endonym: Bahase Melayu Serdang, Jawi: بهاسي ملايو سردڠ) is a Malayic language primarily spoken by the Malay people living in Serdang Bedagai Regency, the city of Tebing Tinggi, and eastern part of Deli Serdang Regency in North Sumatra, Indonesia. It is closely related to other Malay varieties spoken in the eastern coast of Sumatra such as Deli Malay and Langkat Malay. While Serdang Malay is the indigenous language of Serdang, it is no longer dominant due to migration from other parts of Indonesia, including Java and Kalimantan. Despite these influences, Serdang Malay is still widely spoken as the lingua franca and a common language for social interaction in Serdang. It coexists with migrant languages like Javanese and Banjarese. Many migrants, including the Banjar and Batak groups such as the Karo and Mandailing people, are also proficient in Serdang Malay. The language has been influenced by other Indonesian languages, especially Banjarese, brought by Banjar migrants from South Kalimantan. Their influence can be seen in Serdang Malay's phonology and morphology.

Serdang Malay is mainly used in informal settings, while standard Indonesian is reserved for formal contexts such as schools and government institutions. The role of Serdang Malay is evident in daily interactions, including greetings, casual conversations on the street or in markets, and discussions in rice fields, on the beach, and other communal spaces. It is primarily a spoken language, whereas written communication is typically in standard Indonesian. For instance, letters to family members, as well as sermons in mosques and prayer halls, are usually delivered in Indonesian or Arabic. It is also used for traditional Malay ceremonies and rituals. The traditional ceremonies of the Serdang Malay people are closely tied to the belief system of their ancestors, which continues to be practiced today. In these ceremonies, Serdang Malay plays a vital role. The language used in traditional rituals differs from everyday colloquial Serdang Malay. This distinction is marked by specific variations, particularly in word choice kinship terms, and the noble language of the Malay aristocracy, which is rarely used in daily conversation.

== Classification ==
Serdang Malay is a Malayic language. Speakers of Malayic languages are spread from Brunei, Indonesia, Malaysia, Singapore, Southern Thailand, to the southernmost part of the Philippines. Malay is a member of the Austronesian family of languages, which includes languages from Taiwan, Southeast Asia, and the Pacific Ocean, with a smaller number in continental Asia. Malagasy, a geographic outlier spoken in Madagascar in the Indian Ocean, is also a member of this language family. Although these languages are not necessarily mutually intelligible to any extent, their similarities are often quite apparent. In more conservative languages like Malay, many roots have come with relatively little change from their common ancestor, Proto-Austronesian. There are many cognates found in the languages' words for kinship, health, body parts and common animals. Numbers, especially, show remarkable similarities.

Serdang Malay is closely related to other Malay varieties spoken along the eastern coast of North Sumatra, including Asahan Malay, Deli Malay, Langkat Malay, and Panai Malay. Collectively, these varieties are classified as the East Sumatran Malay group. It is estimated that the differences between these dialects ranges from 51% to 71.50%. The differences between these varieties primarily lie in their phonology and lexicon. Despite these differences, they share a high degree of similarity.

== Geographic distribution and usage ==
Serdang Malay is mainly spoken in areas that were once part of the Serdang Sultanate, including Serdang Bedagai Regency, and eastern part of Deli Serdang Regency. It is also spoken in Tebing Tinggi city, where many Serdang Malays migrants from Serdang Bedagai have settled. It is spoken in areas with significant Malay populations, such as Perbaungan, which was the royal capital of the Serdang Sultanate and the cultural center of the Serdang Malays community, as well as Pantai Cermin and Teluk Mengkudu in Serdang Bedagai Regency, and also Lubuk Pakam, the capital of Deli Serdang Regency. In Tanjung Beringin, especially in the village of Nagur on the southeast coast of the regency, Serdang Malay is spoken by the ethnic Malay who are collectively called Tanjung Beringin Malays, also by Javanese minority. This dialect relies mainly on changing the letter [a] to the letter [o], similar to Batubara Malay, unlike other dialects of Serdang Malay which change to the letter [e].

Serdang Malay is primarily used in daily social interactions and traditional ceremonies. Its role is particularly significant in everyday communication, not only among the Serdang Malay community but also among migrant groups such as the Banjar, Mandailing, and Javanese. The traditional ceremonies of the Serdang Malay people are closely tied to the belief system of their ancestors, which continues to be practiced today. These traditions are expressed through various rituals, including engagement, marriage, housewarming, jamu laut (sea offerings), melenggang perut or mandi tian (prenatal rituals), membelah mulut (a baby's first tooth-cutting ceremony), and others. In these ceremonies, Serdang Malay plays a significant role. However, in religious ceremonies, its presence is less prominent. Sermons in mosques, funeral rites, and wedding vows are typically conducted in Arabic, with Indonesian also commonly used.

The use of Serdang Malay in daily life coexists with the languages of migrant communities, such as Banjarese, Javanese, Minangkabau, and Karo. Many Banjar, Karo, and Mandailing people can speak Serdang Malay, and vice versa. In formal education and government, Serdang Malay is no longer used. It remains primarily spoken within families and during traditional ceremonies, while standard Indonesian is used in formal settings. Indonesian, which evolved from Johor-Riau Malay, became the language of instruction in Serdang's formal education system in the early 20th century during the Dutch colonial era. This shift was marked by the establishment of madrasahs, elementary schools, junior high schools, senior high schools, and vocational schools. Many Serdang Malay speakers frequently code-switch or code-mix between Serdang Malay and Indonesian. The growing influence of Indonesian has triggered a language shift, posing a threat to the Serdang Malay community. Younger generations are becoming increasingly reluctant to speak Serdang Malay, while local terms are gradually being replaced by their Indonesian equivalents.

== Phonology ==
Serdang Malay, like many other regional languages in Indonesia, lacks a standardized phonological system. Nevertheless, many of the phonological system designed for Serdang Malay is loosely based on standard Indonesian orthography, especially the system created by the Indonesian Ministry of Education, Culture, Research, and Technology.

=== Vowels ===
Like Indonesian and Standard Malay, Serdang Malay has six vowels. These vowels are /i/, /e/, /ə/, /a/, /u/, and /o/.

	Front	Central	Back
Close	i		u
Mid	e	ə	o
Open		a	

Notes:

- In writing, /e/ and /ə/ are both represented as ⟨e⟩.

=== Consonants ===
Serdang Malay has 19 consonants.

		Labial	Alveolar	Postalveolar	Palatal	Uvular	Velar	Glottal
Nasal		m	n	ɲ			ŋ	
Plosive/ Affricate	voiceless	p	t	t͡ʃ			k	ʔ
Plosive/ Affricate	voiced	b	d	d͡ʒ			ɡ	
Fricative	voiceless		s					h
Fricative	voiced							
Approximant		w	l		j			
Trill						ʀ̥		

Notes: In writing, the following phonemes are represented as thus:

- /ŋ/ is ⟨ng⟩
- /ɲ/ is ⟨ny⟩
- /t͡ʃ/ is ⟨c⟩
- /d͡ʒ/ is ⟨j⟩
- /ʔ/ is ⟨k⟩
- /j/ is ⟨y⟩
- /ʀ̥/ is ⟨r⟩

=== Diphthongs ===
Serdang Malay has 3 diphthongs. The following examples illustrate their usage:

- /au/: ijau 'green'
- /ai/: pantai 'beach'
- /oi/: amboi '(interjection that expresses surprise, pity, or admiration)'

== Grammar ==
Along with Indonesian, standard Malay, and other Malayic languages, the word order in Serdang Malay is typically subject-verb-object (SVO). While there are notable exceptions, the grammar structure of Serdang Malay shares many similarities with Indonesian and Standard Malay.

=== Affixes ===
The affixes found in Serdang Malay are of four types: prefixes, suffixes, circumfixes, and compound affixes. The table below presents a list of some examples of affixes used in Serdang Malay, along with their allomorphs, meanings, and examples:

Type of affixes	Affixes	Allomorphs	Functions and meanings	Example of basic word	Example of derived word
Prefixes	meN-	mem-, men-, me-, ny-, meng, ng-	Used to form verbs or adjectives. It conveys the meaning of ‘performing an action’ when combined with a verb and ‘expressing a quality as described by the root word’ when combined with an adjective.	itam 'black'	ngitam 'to become black'
Prefixes	beR-	be-, ber-	Used to form verbs. It conveys the meaning of ‘having an object as described by the root word’ when combined with a noun, ‘being in a state or performing an action’ when combined with a verb, ‘possessing a quality as described by the root word’ when combined with an adjective, and ‘becoming a group totaling...’ when combined with a numeral.	sabar 'patience'	besabar 'to be patient'
Prefixes	peN-	pem-, pen-, peny-, pe-, peng-	Used to form nouns. It conveys the meaning of ‘forming the meaning of ‘a person who [does something] or a tool for [doing something]’ when combined with a noun or verb, and ‘expressing a quality as described by the root word’ when combined with an adjective.	sapu 'broom'	penyapu 'sweeper'
Prefixes	teR-	te-, ter-	Used to form verbs or adjectives. It conveys the meaning of ‘arriving at…’ when combined with a noun, ‘by accident’ when combined with a verb, and ‘most’ when combined with an adjective.	lagak 'pretty'	telagak 'prettiest'
Prefixes	se-	none	Used to form adjectives and numerals. It conveys the meaning of ‘one’ when combined with a noun and ‘indicating equality’ when combined with an adjective.	burok 'bad'	seburok 'as bad as'
Prefixes	di-	none	Used to form verbs. It conveys the meaning of ‘performing a task with the object described by the root word’ when combined with a noun and ‘performing a task according to the root word’ when combined with a verb.	jale 'net'	dijale 'to be caught using a net'
Suffixes	-i	none	Used to form verbs. It conveys the meaning of ‘performing a task with…’ or ‘discarding or killing’ when combined with a noun, ‘repetitive’ when combined with a verb, and ‘causative’ when combined with an adjective.	kulit 'skin'	kuliti 'to skin something'
Suffixes	-ke	none	Used to form verbs. It conveys the meaning of ‘performing a task as described by the root word’ when combined with a noun, ‘performing a task for someone else’ or ‘causative’ when combined with a verb, and ‘causative’ when combined with an adjective or numerals.	sejok 'cold'	sejokke 'to make something become cold'
Suffixes	-an	none	Used to form nouns. It conveys the meaning of ‘location or what is [verb]-ed’ when combined with a verb and ‘more [adjective]’ when combined with an adjective.	asam 'sour'	asaman 'more sour'
Circumfixes	ke-...-an	none	Used to form nouns. It conveys the meaning of ‘indicating a location’ when combined with a noun, ‘indicating an abstraction or thing’ when combined with a noun and ‘known or suffering or an abstraction’ when combined with an adjective.	raje 'king'	kerajean 'kingdom'
Circumfixes	beR-...-an	be-, ber-	Used to form verbs. It conveys the meaning of ‘mutual’ or ‘an action from the root word performed by many actors at the same time’ when combined with a verb, and ‘many [adjective]’ when combined with an adjective.	pukol 'to hit'	bepukolan 'to hit one another'
Circumfixes	peN-...-an	pem-, pen-, peny-, pe-, peng-	Used to form nouns. It conveys the meaning of ‘thing or result’ when combined with a verb or adjective.	jual 'to sell'	penjualan 'sales'
Circumfixes	peR-...-an	pe-, peR-	Used to form nouns. It conveys the meaning of ‘things related to what is mentioned in the root word,’ ‘area,’ or ‘place’ when combined with a noun or verb.	perang 'war'	peperangan 'things related to wars'
Compound affixes	meN-...-ke	mem-, men-, me-, ny-, meng, ng-	Used to form verbs. It conveys the meaning of ‘performing a task according to the root word’ when combined with a verb, and ‘making it as described by the root word’ when combined with an adjective or verb.	angkat 'to lift'	ngangkatke 'performing the task of lifting'
Compound affixes	meN-...-i	mem-, men-, me-, ny-, meng, ng-	Used to form verbs. It conveys the meaning of ‘giving or discarding as described by the root word’ when combined with a noun, ‘performing a repetitive task or many actors performing the task’ when combined with a verb, and ‘making/causing (the object) as described by the root word’ when combined with an adjective.	garam 'salt'	menggarami 'to add salt to something'
Compound affixes	di-...-ke	none	Used to form verbs.It conveys the meaning of ‘performing a task as described by the root word’ when combined with a verb or adjective.	lebar 'wide'	dilebarke 'to be widened'
Compound affixes	di-...-kenye	none	Used to form verbs. It conveys the meaning of ‘performing a task as described by the root word’ when combined with a noun, verb, or adjective.	cabot 'to pluck'	dicabotkenye 'performing the task of plucking'
Compound affixes	teR-...-i	te-, ter-	Used to form verbs. It conveys the meaning of ‘can be [verb]’ when combined with a noun, verb, or adjective.	dekat 'near'	tedekati 'can be approached'

=== Reduplication ===
In Serdang Malay, as in other varieties of Malay, reduplication is also present. Reduplication in Serdang Malay does not change the word class. Reduplication serves several functions, such as indicating plurality, expressing repeated actions, conveying reciprocity, indicating ‘somewhat’ or ‘rather,’ describing quality, condition, or characteristic as stated in the root word, and denoting distributive quantity within groups. There are two types of reduplication in Serdang Malay: base-form reduplication and affixed-form reduplication.

Examples of base-form reduplication are shown below:

- tingkap 'window' → tingkap-tingkap 'windows'
- daon 'leaf' → daon-daon 'leaves'
- malu 'shy' → malu-malu 'a bit shy'
- panjang 'long' → panjang-panjang 'long things'

Examples of affixed-form reduplication are shown below:

- meriah 'crowded' → semeriah-meriahnye 'as crowded as possible'
- dekap 'to hug' → bedekap-dekapan 'to hug one another'
- bual 'to talk' → bebual-bual 'to chat repetitively'
- lari 'to run' → berlari-lari 'to run around repetitively'

=== Nouns ===
Nouns in Serdang Malay have several characteristics. They can function as the subject, predicate, and object in a sentence. They can be accompanied by the morphemes nun or yan meaning ‘that’ and ne or nen meaning ‘this.’ They can also be followed by the morpheme nang meaning ‘who/which.’ Additionally, nouns can take affixes such as peN-, peN-...-an, peR-...-an, -an, and ke-...-an. They can be pluralized through reduplication and can be replaced by the pronouns die meaning ‘he/she’ and mereke meaning ‘they.’ In Serdang Malay, nouns can be classified into four types based on their ability to be preceded by classifiers when expressing quantity. The first type consists of nouns that can be preceded by the classifier buah, which is used for inanimate objects, large items, or general things. The second type includes nouns that can be preceded by ekor, a classifier specifically used for animals. The third type includes nouns that can be preceded by orang ‘person’ when specifying quantity. The fourth type consists of uncountable nouns.

Examples of nouns that can be preceded by the classifier buah are shown below:

- due buah kelamber 'two coconuts'
- tujoh buah pisang 'seven bananas'

Examples of nouns that can be preceded by the classifier ekor are shown below:

- tige ekor ikan 'three fishes'
- lime ekor ketam 'five crabs'

Examples of nouns that can be preceded by the classifier orang are shown below:

- lapan orang pendudok 'eight locals'
- enam orang nelayan 'six fishermen'

Examples of uncountable nouns are shown below:

- kebahagian 'happiness'
- kesejokan 'coldness'

=== Verbs ===
Verbs in Serdang Malay have several characteristics. They tend to function as predicates, can be followed by adjectives, and can be preceded by particles. They can take various affixes, including me-, beR-, beR-...-an, -ke, -i, meN-...-ke, meN-...-i, teR-, teR-...-ke, and teR-...-i. Additionally, verbs can be made passive by adding the affixes di-, di-...-ke, and di-...-i. Serdang Malay verbs can be categorized into three types: verbs that can be followed by a single noun, verbs that can be followed by a noun phrase, and verbs that are not followed by a noun (intransitive verbs).

Examples of verbs that can be followed by a single noun are shown below:

- membawe padi 'to bring crops'
- menjual mempelam 'to sell mangoes'

Examples of verbs that can be followed by a noun phrase are shown below:

- menebang pokok kelamber 'to cut down a coconut tree'
- nyari jarom jaet 'to find a sewing needle'

Examples of intransitive verbs are shown below:

- beputar 'to turn'
- benyanyi 'to sing'

=== Adjectives ===
Adjectives in Serdang Malay have several characteristics. They can be followed or preceded by nouns, preceded by verbs, followed by particles as intensifiers, and take the suffix -an to indicate a comparative degree. There are three types of adjectives in Serdang Malay: the positive form, the comparative form, and the superlative form. The positive form is used to describe a simple or neutral quality, without any comparison. The comparative form expresses a difference in degree between two entities, typically indicating that something is more or less than another, and can be marked by the prefix se- or the suffix -an. The superlative form indicates the highest or extreme degree of a quality, often describing the most or least of something in comparison, and can be marked by the morpheme kali, sunggoh or betol, all of which in this context means 'so', ‘very’ or ‘extremely'. These comparative structures can be expressed through either bound or free morphemes.

Examples of positive adjectives are shown below:

- kabar mendai 'good news'
- tidor lelap 'deep sleep'

Examples of comparative adjectives are shown below:

- sepokak 'as deaf as'
- meriahan 'more crowded'

Examples of superlative adjectives are shown below:

- sial betol 'very unfortunate'
- lambat kali 'so slow'

=== Numerals ===
Numerals in Serdang Malay have several characteristics. They can be followed by nouns and can undergo reduplication to indicate grouped quantities. There are three types of numerals in Serdang Malay: definite numerals, which express specific quantities; indefinite numerals, which indicate an unspecified amount; and ordinal numerals, which denote ranking or order.

Examples of definite numerals are shown below:

- satu 'one'
- lime 'five'
- sepuloh 'ten'
- tige puloh 'thirty'

Examples of indefi

- banyak 'many'
- sikit 'few'
- semue 'all'

Examples of ordinal numerals are shown below:

- kedue 'second'
- kelime 'fifth'
- kesebelas 'eleventh'

=== Particles ===
Particles in Serdang Malay have distinct characteristics: they cannot take affixes, they can be followed by nouns, verbs, adjectives, or numerals, and they can be preceded by nouns or verbs. Particles can be classified into several types: those that can be followed by nouns, those that can be followed by verbs or adjectives, those that can only be preceded by adjectives, those that can be followed by numerals and adjectives, those that can be followed by both nouns and verbs, and those that function as connectors between words, between words and phrases, or between phrases.

Examples of particles that can be followed by nouns are shown below:

- di pekan 'at the market'
- ke kebun 'to the field'
- dari laot 'from the sea'

Examples of particles that can be followed by verbs or adjectives are shown below:

- belom balek 'have not go home'
- tengah tidor 'is sleeping'
- endah masok 'wants to enter'

Examples of particles that can only be preceded by adjectives are shown below:

- lagak kali 'so pretty'
- malas betol 'so lazy'
- besar sunggoh 'so big'

Examples of particles that can be followed by numerals and adjective are shown below:

- amper putus 'almost disconnected'
- kurang satu 'short by one'
- lebeh tige 'an excess of three'

Examples of particles that can be followed by both nouns and verbs are shown below:

- ia pe 'he too'
- raje pe 'the king too'
- makan pe belom 'have not eaten too'

Examples of particles that function as connectors between words, between words and phrases, or between phrases are shown below:

- lenjar tide datang ie 'and then he did not come'
- raje seberang tekene lenjar tekapar 'the king on the other side was struck until he collapsed'
- emak dan abah 'mom and dad'

== Vocabulary ==
Like other varieties of Eastern Sumatran Malay, Serdang Malay features a wealth of unique lexicons not found in Indonesian or other Malay varieties. As with many Malay dialects, it has absorbed numerous loanwords from foreign languages, particularly Arabic, due to the influence of Islam in both the Serdang region and the wider area. An example of this is abah 'father', which is borrowed from the Arabic abā (أَبَاً). Additionally, Serdang Malay has incorporated loanwords from Indonesian. As Indonesian holds the status of the national language and serves as the lingua franca in schools, many traditional Serdang Malay words have gradually been replaced by their Indonesian counterparts, leading to the decline in usage of many Serdang Malay terms.

Below are examples of commonly used Serdang Malay vocabularies along with their Indonesian and English translations:

=== Numerals ===
Number	Serdang Malay	Indonesian	English
1	satu	satu	one
2	due	dua	two
3	tige	tiga	three
4	mpat	empat	four
5	lime	lima	five
6	enam	enam	six
7	tujoh, tujuh	tujuh	seven
8	lapan	delapan	eight
9	sembilan	sembilan	nine
10	sepuloh	sepuluh	ten
11	sebelas	sebelas	eleven
20	due puloh	dua puluh	twenty
50	lime puloh	lima puluh	fifty
100	seratus	seratus	one hundred
500	lima ratus	lima ratus	five hundred
1000	seribu	seribu	one thousand
5000	lime ribu	lima ribu	five thousand
100,000	seratus ribu	seratus ribu	one hundred thousand
1,000,000	sejute, satu jute	sejuta, satu juta	one million

=== Directions ===
Serdang Malay	Indonesian	English
nen, ne, yen	ini	this
nun, yun, nyan	itu	that
sini	sini	here
sian	situ	there (close)
sana	sana	there (far)
disini, tan sini	disini	over here
disian, tan sian	disitu	over there (close)
disana, tan sana	disana	over there (far)
kiri	kiri	left
kanan	kanan	right
atas	atas	up
bawah	bawah	down
utare	utara	north
selatan	selatan	south
timor	timur	east
barat	barat	west

=== Personal Pronouns ===
Serdang Malay	Indonesian	English
awak, ambe	aku, saya	I, me
kau, kalian, kelen	kamu, engkau	you (informal)
die, ie	dia	he/she
kami	kami	we (exclusive)
kite	kita	we (inclusive)
mereke	mereka	they/them

=== Interrogatives Pronouns ===
Serdang Malay	Indonesian	English
sape	siapa	who
maye	apa	what
nape	kenapa, mengapa	why
mane	mana, dimana	where
bile	kapan	when
maye	gimana, bagaimana	how
berape	berapa	how much
bile, menakale	bila, apabila, kalau	if

=== Nouns ===
Serdang Malay	Indonesian	English
aer	air	water
pokok	pohon	tree
sungai, sei	sungai	river
laot	laut	sea
pantai	pantai	beach
lumpor, lumpur	lumpur	mud
laki-laki	pria, laki-laki	man
empuan	wanita, perempuan	woman
tanak	tanah	land, ground, soil
gunong, gunung	gunung	mountain
paser, pasir	pasir	sand
mateari	matahari	sun
jalan	jalan	road
kude	kuda	horse
anjing	anjing	dog
budak	anak	child, kid
pekan	pasar	market
daon	daun	leaf
kulit	kulit	skin
ekor	ekor	tail
telinge	telinga	ear
kepale	kepala	head
leher	leher	neck
ati	hati	heart
mulut	mulut	mouth
hidung	hidung	nose
tingkap	jendela	window
pintu	pintu	door
tilam, katel, bale-bale	kasur	bed

=== Verbs ===
Serdang Malay	Indonesian	English
makan	makan	eat
minom	minum	drink
lari	lari	run
bicara, bual	bicara	to talk
basoh, nyesah	basuh, cuci	wash
masok	masuk	to enter
tegak	berdiri	to stand
naler	mengalir	to flow
terbang	terbang	to fly
keleh	lihat, tengok	see
dengar	dengar	listen
bayar	bayar	pay
bemain	bermain	to play
ambek	ambil	take
beli	beli	buy
jual	jual	sell
balek	balik	to go back
tidor	tidur	to sleep
pegi	pergi	to go
kasih	beri, kasih	to give
buni	sembunyi	to hide
endak	mau	to want

=== Adjectives ===
Serdang Malay	Indonesian	English
misken	miskin	poor
kaye	kaya	rich
mendai	bagus, baik	good
burok	buruk	bad
lebar	lebar	wide
sempit	sempit	narrow
lagak, mendai	cantik	pretty
sedih	sedih	sad
besar	besar, gede	big, large
kecik	kecil	small
angat	panas	hot
sejok	dingin, sejuk	cold
paet, pait	pahit	bitter
manis	manis	sweet
asin	asin	salty
gelap	gelap	dark
berat	berat	heavy
kering	kering	dry
lame	lama	long (time), old
baru	baru	new
layuh	lemah	weak
kuat	kuat	strong
sakit	sakit	sick
berseh	bersih	clean
kotor	kotor	dirty
muak	bosan, muak	bored
banyak	banyak	many
sikit	sedikit	little

== Writing system ==
Like many other Malay varieties, Serdang Malay was historically written in Jawi script, also known as Arab-Melayu, a modified form of the Arabic script. Jawi served as the royal script of the Sultanate of Serdang and was used in official contexts, such as correspondence with other Malay kingdoms. Jawi was also widely used in Serdang's cultural sphere, including inscriptions and traditional Serdang Malay ceremonies. The use of Jawi script declined significantly during the Dutch colonial era with the introduction of the Latin script. This trend continued after Indonesia's independence, as standard Indonesian, written in the Latin script, became the official medium of instruction in schools. Today, the use of Jawi in Serdang is very limited in daily life and is mostly confined to cultural and religious purposes.

== See also ==
- Serdang Bedagai Regency
- Deli Serdang Regency
- Sultanate of Serdang
- Langkat Malay
- Bilah–Panai Malay
- Deli Malay
- Tamiang Malay

== Bibliography ==
- Noor, Yusmaniar; Naibaho, Jawasi; Fadilla (1995). Struktur Bahasa Melayu Serdang [Structure of Serdang Malay] (PDF) (in Indonesian). Jakarta: Agency for Language Development and Cultivation. ISBN 979-459-492-X.
- R., Rosmawatl; Siregar, Anni Krisna; Siregar, Ahmad Samin; Abidin, Zainal (1990). Struktur Sastra Lisan Melayu Serdang [Structure of Oral Literature in Serdang Malay] (PDF) (in Indonesian). Jakarta: Agency for Language Development and Cultivation. ISBN 979-459-081-9.
- Setia, Eddy; Husni, Chairul; Deliana (1990). Fungsi dan Kedudukan Sastra Lisan Melayu Serdang [Function and Position of Oral Literature in Serdang Malay] (PDF) (in Indonesian). Jakarta: Agency for Language Development and Cultivation. ISBN 979-459-077-0.
