= Tamiang Malay =

Malayic language spoken in Indonesia

- bahase Temiang بهاس تامينڬ
- Pronunciation: [ba.ha.sə təˈmi.aŋ]
- Native to: Indonesia (Aceh)
- Region: Aceh Tamiang and Langsa
- Ethnicity: Tamiang Malays
- Native speakers: (136,270 cited 1981 estimate)
- Language family: Austronesian: Malayo-Polynesian; (disputed); Malayic; Tamiang Malay
- Dialects: Tamiang Hilir; Tamiang Tengah; Tamiang Hulu
- Writing system: Latin (Indonesian alphabet); Jawi

Official status
- Recognised minority language in: Indonesia: Aceh

Language codes
- ISO 639-3: –
- Glottolog: None
- Areas where Tamiang Malay is spoken by the majority of the population Areas where Tamiang Malay is spoken by a significant minority of the population

Tamiang Malay (bahase Temiang, Jawi: بهاس تامينڬ), is a Malayic language spoken in Indonesia, specifically in the Aceh Tamiang and significant minorities in Langsa on southeastern Aceh, bordering North Sumatra. It is primarily spoken by the native Malay people of Tamiang. Tamiang Malay is significantly different from Acehnese, the dominant language in Aceh, and they are mutually unintelligible. Instead, Tamiang Malay shows similarities to Langkat Malay and Deli Malay spoken in neighboring North Sumatra. Additionally, Tamiang Malay has been influenced by other languages, such as Acehnese and Gayonese, forming a distinct Malay dialect unique to the region. Tamiang Malay plays a significant role in the daily lives of the Tamiang community. For example, traditional ceremonies, community activities, and other social interactions are conducted in Tamiang Malay. Additionally, for the Tamiang people, Tamiang Malay is considered as a symbol of pride and a distinct regional identity. Most Tamiang people are proficient in Acehnese and Indonesian, in addition to their mother tongue.

The Malays have inhabited Tamiang since the 7th century. Tamiang was once ruled by various pre-Islamic Malay kingdoms and empires, including the Sriwijaya and the Tamiang Kingdom. The increasing influence of the Samudera Pasai Sultanate led to the Islamization of Tamiang in the 14th century. This has resulted in the assimilation of Tamiang culture with other cultures, such as the Acehnese. The continuous arrival of immigrants from other parts of Indonesia has threatened the existence of Tamiang Malay, as its usage has gradually diminished. Many of the current generation of Tamiang Malays is not proficient in Tamiang Malay; instead, they are more comfortable speaking Indonesian.

== Classification ==
Tamiang Malay is a Malayic language or also Malay dialect. Speakers of Malayic languages are spread from Brunei, Indonesia, Malaysia, Singapore, Southern Thailand, to the southernmost part of the Philippines. Malay is a member of the Austronesian family of languages, which includes languages from Taiwan, Southeast Asia, and the Pacific Ocean, with a smaller number in continental Asia. Malagasy, a geographic outlier spoken in Madagascar in the Indian Ocean, is also a member of this language family. Although these languages are not necessarily mutually intelligible to any extent, their similarities are often quite apparent. In more conservative languages like Malay, many roots have come with relatively little change from their common ancestor, Proto-Austronesian. There are many cognates found in the languages' words for kinship, health, body parts and common animals. Numbers, especially, show remarkable similarities.

Tamiang Malay shows similarity with other Malay dialects spoken in the eastern coast of Sumatra, such as Deli Malay and Langkat Malay. According to Sahril (2007:156), Tamiang Malay is grouped with several other varieties of Malay on the east coast of Sumatra, namely Langkat, Deli, Serdang, Batubara, Asahan, Kualuh, Panai, and Bilah. Several opinions suggest that the Tamiang Malay community originated from the immigration of Malays from Langkat, Penang, and Langkawi. However, some argue that the Tamiang Malay language originated from immigrants from the Riau Islands, specifically Bintan and Lingga, who were fleeing attacks by the Sriwijaya Kingdom. This community settled in Tamiang and developed the language. The language is not mutually intelligible with Acehnese, the dominant and co-official language in Aceh. However, there may be influences on Tamiang Malay from Acehnese, as Tamiang was historically ruled by the Aceh Sultanate for centuries, and the status of Acehnese as the lingua franca of the province.

== Geographic distribution and usage ==
Tamiang Malay is primarily spoken by the Tamiang Malays. It is the dominant language throughout the Aceh Tamiang Regency on southeastern Aceh, except in the Manyak Payet and Kuala Simpang Districts, where Acehnese is predominantly spoken. Aside from Malays, there are also other ethnic groups inhabiting Aceh Tamiang, such as Acehnese, Gayo, and Minangkabau, who speak their own mother tongue. In addition, many migrants from other parts of Indonesia, such as the Javanese, have moved to Aceh Tamiang since the Dutch colonial era and continuing through the New Order era. In some parts of Aceh Tamiang, the Javanese form the majority of the population. Tamiang Malay also has a significant minority of speakers in Langsa, north of Aceh Tamiang, which is proven by the Dutch East Indies government's general report on education in Aceh in 1933 and 1934, with 38 schools in Langsa using Malay as the main language of instruction, the largest number of any region in Aceh.

Tamiang Malay is widely used as a language of communication among ethnic Malays in Aceh Tamiang. It is commonly spoken in informal and semi-formal contexts, such as in markets and at cultural events. In official settings, such as government institutions and higher educational institutions, Indonesian is used instead. Most Tamiang Malays are trilingual, able to speak Acehnese and Indonesian in addition to their native tongue. Acehnese serves as the dominant language within Aceh and is commonly used to communicate with people from other regions within the province. Indonesian, being the national language of Indonesia, is used for communication with people outside of Aceh. Tamiang Malay is also included in the elementary school curriculum in Aceh Tamiang Regency as part of the regional languages program.

== Dialects ==
Generally, Tamiang Malay has two dialects, the hulu 'inland' dialect and the hilir 'coastal' dialect. The inland dialect of Tamiang Malay shares similarities with Kelantan and Kedah Malay spoken in the Malay Peninsula, while the coastal dialect is shares similarities to other Malay dialects spoken on the eastern coast of Sumatra. The primary distinctions between these two dialects are found in their phonology and lexicon. For example, words that typically end with [a] in standard Malay and Indonesian change to [o] in the inland dialect, similar to Minangkabau and Malay dialects spoken in the eastern coast of the Malay Peninsula. In the coastal dialect, these words end with [e], similar to other Malay dialects elsewhere. Some scholars also identify a third dialect, the tengah 'central' dialect, which is spoken in the urban central part of Tamiang. The inland dialect, specifically the one spoken in Karang Baru, the capital of Aceh Tamiang, is regarded as the prestige dialect of Tamiang Malay. Despite the differences between these dialects, they are generally mutually intelligible. Each of these dialects has its own sub-dialects, which may differ slightly from one village to another. Below are a few examples of lexical differences between the coastal and inland dialects:

Standard Indonesian	Coastal dialect	Inland dialect
deras 'heavy (rain or flow)'	deġas	deġeh
dengar 'to listen'	dengaq	dengoq
siapa 'who'	hape	hapo

== Phonology ==
Tamiang Malay, like many other regional languages in Indonesia, lacks a standardized phonological system. However, many phonological representations for Tamiang Malay are loosely modeled after standard Indonesian orthography. Notably, Tamiang Malay has retained most of the consonant and vowel phonemes from Proto-Malay, preserving much of its historical linguistic structure. The phonological system presented below is based on the Karang Baru dialect, considered the prestige dialect of Tamiang Malay.

=== Vowels ===
Like Indonesian and Standard Malay, Tamiang Malay has six phonemic vowels: /i, ə, e, a, o, u/. However, it also includes an additional vowel, /ɒ/.

	Front	Central	Back
Close	i		u
Mid	e	ə	o
Open		a	ɒ

Notes:

In writing, the following phonemes are represented as thus:

- /e/ and /ə/ are both represented as ⟨e⟩.
- /ɒ/ can be represented as ⟨o⟩ or ⟨ô⟩.

=== Consonants ===
Tamiang Malay has 19 consonants. The phoneme /ʀ̥/ is not found in Indonesian, while the consonant phonemes /f/, /z/, /x/, /ʃ/, and /ʔ/ that are present in Indonesian are absent in Tamiang Malay.

		Labial	Alveolar	Postalveolar	Dorsal	Glottal
Nasal		m	n	ɲ	ŋ	
Plosive/ Affricate	voiceless	p	t	t͡ʃ	k	
Plosive/ Affricate	voiced	b	d	d͡ʒ	ɡ	
Fricative			s			h
Approximant			l			
Trill			r		ʀ̥	
Semivowel		w			j	

Notes:

In writing, the following phonemes are represented as thus:

- /ŋ/ is ⟨ng⟩
- /ɲ/ is ⟨ny⟩
- /t͡ʃ/ is ⟨c⟩
- /d͡ʒ/ is ⟨j⟩
- /χ̞/ is ⟨r⟩

=== Diphthongs ===
In Tamiang Malay, there are only two diphthong vowels: /uy/ and /oy/. These diphthongs can be found in the following words:

- /ui̯/ → /kaluy/ 'giant gourami'
- /oi̯/ → /dɒdoy/ 'rhythm in singing'

=== Phonological change ===
Phonological changes in Tamiang Malay are not phonemic, meaning that variations in word stress, tone, and sound length do not create differences in meaning. However, sentence stress (intonation), even in single-word sentences, can differentiate meaning. In other words, sentence stress (intonation) can affect the meaning of a sentence.

== Grammar ==
Along with Indonesian, standard Malay, and other Malayic languages, the word order in Tamiang Malay is typically subject-verb-object (SVO). While there are notable exceptions, the grammar structure of Tamiang Malay shares many similarities with Indonesian and Standard Malay.

=== Affixes ===
Tamiang Malay features a variety of affixes that combine with base words to create affixed terms. Similar to other Malayic languages, Tamiang Malay employs four types of affixes: prefixes, infixes and suffixes. Prefixes are added at the start of a word, suffixes at the end, and infixes within the middle. A circumfix, or discontinuous affix, attaches partially to both the beginning and end of the base word. In Tamiang Malay, as in other Malayic languages, words typically consist of a root or a root combined with derivational affixes. The root, usually bisyllabic with a CV(C)CV(C) pattern, functions as the primary lexical unit and is often a noun or verb. Affixes modify or extend the meaning of roots, resulting in new words.

==== Prefixes ====
Example of prefixes commonly found in Tamiang Malay are N-, be-, peN-, ke-, se-, di-, and te-.

The prefix N- functions to form verbs from nouns, adjectives, or numeral basic words. The prefix N- changes to n- when the first phoneme of the base word starts with the consonant t, changes to ny- when the first consonant of the base word starts with s, c, and j, changes to ng- when the first phoneme of the base word starts with the consonants g, k, and h, as well as all vowel phonemes (a, i, u, o, e), and changes to m- when the first phoneme of the base word starts with a bilabial consonant (p, b). If the base word consists of a verb, then the prefix N- means performing the action intended by the verb. For example:

- N- + cari 'find' → nyari 'to find'
- N- + tulih 'write' → nulih 'to write'
- N- + ambil 'take' → ngambil 'to take'

If the base word consists of a noun, then the prefix N- has several meanings, such as indicating direction, hitting, making, applying, resembling, giving, showing, performing a job, eating, or smoking. For example:

- N- + tepi 'edge' → nepi 'to pull over'
- N- + sayur 'vegetable' → nyayur 'to add vegetable'
- N- + paku 'nail' → maku 'to nail'
- N- + gunong 'mountain' → nggunong 'to pile up'
- N- + kulit 'skin' → nguliti 'to skin'
- N- + pupuk 'fertilizer' → mupuk 'to fertilize'
- N- + cangkol 'hoe' → nyangkol 'to hoe'
- N- + rokok 'cigarette' → ngrokok 'to smoke cigarette'

If the base word consists of an adjective, then the prefix N- means 'to become' or 'to make'. For example:

- N- + kuning 'yellow' → nguning 'to become yellow'
- N- + tinggi 'tall' → ninggi 'to become tall' or 'to make taller'
- N- + pecah 'shatter' → mecah 'to shatter'

If the base word consists of a numeral, then the prefix N- means 'to become' or 'to commemorate'. For example:

- N- + tujoh 'seven' → nujoh 'to commemorate the seventh day'
- N- + duo 'two' → nduo 'to double'
- N- + satu 'one' → nyatu 'to unite' or 'to combine'

In general, the function of the prefix be- is to form verbs. The prefix be- can precede nouns, verbs, adjectives, or numerals. The form be- changes to beR- when followed by a base word that begins with a vowel phoneme, and it does not change when followed by a consonant phoneme. The prefix be- when the base word is a noun carries several meanings, such as having, wearing/riding, producing/giving birth, working on, working, or searching. For example:

- be- + adi 'younger sibling' → beadi 'to have a younger sibling'
- be- + kudo 'horse' → bekudo 'to ride a horse'
- be- + telor 'egg' → betelor 'to lay eggs'
- be- + dagang 'trade' → bedagang 'to bargain'
- be- + tani 'farmer' → betani 'to farm'
- be- + kerang 'shell' → bekerang 'to gather shells'

The prefix be- when preceding a verb means being in the state of performing an action. For example:

- be- + lari 'run' → belari 'is running'
- be- + tengkor 'quarrel' → betengkor 'is quarreling'
- be- + cukur 'shave' → becukur 'is shaving'

The prefix be- when preceding a numeral means 'to become/composed of'. For example:

- be- + duo 'two' → beduo 'two of them'
- be- + limo 'five' → belimo 'five of them'

The prefix peN- functions to form nouns from other word types, such as verbs and adjectives. The prefix peN- changes to pem- when the first phoneme of the base word starts with the bilabial consonants b or p, changes to pen- when the first phoneme of the base word starts with t, d, or j, changes to peng- when the first phoneme of the base word starts with the consonants k, g, h or a vowel, and changes to peny- when the first letter of the base word starts with the bilabial consonants b or p. The prefix peN- when preceding a verb has several meanings, such as indicating a tool used to perform an action or referring to an object, indicating a person who performs the action described by the base word, and referring to a person known for the profession described by the base word. For example:

- peN- + apuh 'erase' → pengapuh 'eraser'
- peN- + daki 'climber' → pendaki 'climber'
- peN- + makan 'eat' → pemakan 'eater'

The prefix peN- when preceding an adjective indicates a person who possesses the characteristic described by the base word. For example:

- peN- + malah 'lazy' → pemalah 'lazy person'
- peN- + marah 'angry' → pemarah 'tempered person'
- peN- + mudo 'young' → pemudo 'youngster'

The prefix te- in Tamiang Malay functions to form passive verbs. The prefix te- can precede base words that are verbs or adjectives. This prefix changes to teR- when the base word begins with a vowel phoneme and does not change if followed by a base word that begins with a consonant phoneme. The prefix te- when preceding a verb can imply an action that is accidental, an action that has been completed, or an ability/capability. For example:

- te- + simbah 'splash' → tesimbah 'get splashed'
- te- + cantum 'mention' → tecantum 'mentioned'
- te- + kelih 'see' → tekelih 'seen'

The prefix te- when preceding an adjective indicates a superlative meaning or the sense of "most." For example:

- te- + baik 'good' → tebaik 'best'
- te- + lamo 'long (time)' → telama 'longest'
- te- + rajing 'hardworking' → terajing 'most hardworking'

The prefix di- functions to form passive verbs. In its use, this prefix can be attached to both verbal and nominal base words. Adding this prefix to a word does not cause any changes to the base word. The prefix di- when preceding a verb implies a passive meaning, with the focus being on the subject receiving the action. For example:

- di- + tegor 'reprimand' → ditegor 'reprimanded'
- di- + sapo 'greet' → disapo 'greeted'
- di- + kunyah 'chew' → dikunyah 'chewed'

The prefix di- when preceding a noun implies meanings such as "given," "made into," or "removed." For example:

- di- + gulo 'sugar' → disugor 'being given sugar'
- di- + sayur 'vegetable' → disayur 'to be made into vegetable'
- di- + tulang 'bone' → ditulangi 'to remove the bone'

The prefix ke- can be combined with base words that are adjectives or numerals. The presence of this prefix in a word does not cause any changes to the form of the base word. The prefix ke- when preceding an adjective or a state indicates the meaning of "that which is...". For example:

- ke- + tue 'old' → ketue 'chief' or 'elder'
- ke- + kasih 'give' → kekasih 'lover'

The prefix ke- when preceding a numeral can carry several meanings, such as indicating a group or sequence. For example:

- ke- + tujuh 'seven' → ketujuh 'the seventh'
- ke- + duo 'give' + kawan 'friend' → keduo kawannya 'his two friends'

The prefix se- means "one." The prefix se- attached to certain base words does not alter the form of the base word. This prefix can be combined with base words that are verbs, nouns, adjectives, or numerals. Combining the prefix se- with these types of words does not change their word class. The prefix se- when preceding a noun implies the meaning of "one" or "whole." For example:

- se- + pasang 'pair' → sepasang 'a pair'
- se- + hari 'day' → sehari 'whole day'
- se- + ekor 'tail' → seekor '(measuring word for animals)'

==== Suffixes ====
There are only few suffixes in Tamiang Malay. Examples of suffixes in Tamiang Malay include -i, -ke, and the personal pronoun endings -ku, -mu, and -nye. These suffixes are directly attached to the end of the base word. Attaching these suffixes to a base word does not result in any changes to the form of the base word.

The suffix -i can be added to base words that are verbs, nouns, or adjectives. The function of this suffix is to form active transitive verbs from other word types. The suffix -i when attached to the end of a verb conveys the meaning of an action performed repeatedly or indicates 'to', 'at', or 'towards' something. For example:

- pukul 'beat' + -i → mukuli 'to beat something'
- ambil 'take' + -i → ambili 'to take something'
- angkek 'carry' + -i → ngangkeki 'to carry something'

The suffix -i when attached to a noun conveys the meaning of giving or removing. For example:

- garam 'salt' + -i → garali 'to add salt'
- gulo 'sugar' + -i → guloi 'to add sugar'
- N- + kulit 'skin' + -i → kuliti 'to skin'

The suffix -i attached to the end of adjectives carries the meaning of causing/becoming. For example:

- baru 'new' + -i → barui 'to renew'
- merah 'red' + -i → merahi 'to redden'
- luruh 'stiff' + -i → luruhi 'to stiffen'

Just like the suffix -i, the suffix -ke also functions to form transitive verbs. The difference between the two is that the suffix -ke indicates that the object moves or shifts, while the suffix -i indicates that the object remains or does not move. In its usage, the suffix -ke is added at the end of the base word of verbs and adjectives. The meaning contained in the suffix -ke is to express something imperative (commands). For example:

- duduk 'sit' + -ke → dudukke 'to sit on it'
- bawo 'bring' + -ke → bawokke 'to bring it '
- rami 'lively' + -ke → ramike 'to make it lively'

The suffix -ku is included among the first-person possessive suffixes. Adding the suffix -ku to the end of a word does not result in a change of word class. Its function is to indicate possession by the first-person singular. For example:

- adi 'younger sibling' + -ku → adiku 'my younger sibling'
- dapo 'older sibling' + -ku → dapoku 'my older sibling'
- seluar 'pants' + -ku → seluarku 'my pants'

The suffix -mu is also a pronominal suffix that indicates possession for the second person singular. For example:

- rumah 'house' + -mu → rumahmu 'your house'
- empele 'wife' + -mu → empelemu 'your wife'
- baju 'shirt' + -mu → bajumu 'your shirt'

Just like the suffix -mu, the suffix -nye is also a pronominal suffix, specifically the third person singular suffix, which functions to indicate possession or ownership by a third person. For example:

- kelaku 'behavior' + -nye → kelakunye 'his/her behavior'
- kebung 'garden' + -nye → kebuungnye 'his/her garden'
- belang 'farm' + -nye → belangnye 'his/her farm'

==== Infixes ====
In Tamiang Malay, there are only a few infixes, such as -eR-, -el-, and -em-.

The infix -eR- can be inserted into base nouns and verbs. Inserting the infix -eR- into these types of words does not change the word class. The meaning that arises from this insertion is to indicate "many," and sometimes it implies "in a state of." The infix -eR- inserted into a noun conveys the meaning of "many." For example:

- gigi 'tooth' + -eR- → gerigi 'many teeth'

The infix -eR- inserted into a verb conveys the meanings of "in a condition" and "many." For example:

- gantung 'hang' + -eR- → gerantung 'in a hanging state'

Just like the infix -eR-, the infix -el- is considered an unproductive affix that does not form new words. The function supported by the infix -el- is to form new words without changing the word class of the base word. The infix -el- is inserted into base verbs, conveying the meaning that the action described by the base word is performed repeatedly. For example:

- sidik 'investigate' + -el- → selidik 'to investigate multiple times'

The form and function of this infix are similar to the previous two infixes. The infix -em- is inserted into base nouns, verbs, and adjectives. The presence of the infix -em- in these types of words conveys various meanings. When -em- is inserted into a noun, it carries the meaning of "many" or "various." For example:

- gunong 'mountain' + -em- → gemunong 'many mountains'
- tali 'rope' + -em- → temali 'many ropes'

The infix inserted into a verb conveys the meaning of repetition, as seen in the following examples:

- gulung 'roll' + -em- → gemulung 'to roll repeatedly'
- getar 'shake' + -em- → gemetar 'to shake repeatedly'

The infix -em- inserted into an adjective indicates intensity, as in the following examples:

- terang 'bright' + -em- → temerang 'always bright'

=== Reduplication ===
In Tamiang Malay, there are five types of word reduplication: full reduplication, sound-alternating reduplication, reduplication with affixes, partial reduplication, and triple reduplication. Full reduplication can be further divided into two categories: full reduplication with affixes and full reduplication without affixes. Examples of full reduplication without affixes include:

- anak-anak 'children'
- urang-urang 'people'
- kelieh-kelieh 'look around'

Examples of full reduplication with affixes include:

- penyakit-penyakit 'diseases'
- penari-penari 'dancers'
- pemaco-pemaco 'readers'

There are two types of sound-alternating reduplication forms in Tamiang Malay: sound-alternating reduplication with vowel phoneme changes and sound-alternating reduplication with consonant phoneme changes. Examples of sound-alternating reduplication with vowel phoneme changes include:

- bolak-balek 'to go back and forth'
- mundar-mandir 'to wander back and forth'
- teka-teki 'puzzle'

Examples of sound-alternating reduplication with consonant phoneme changes include:

- sayur-mayur 'vegetables'
- simpang-siur 'rumors'
- kaco-balo 'chaos'

There are two types of affixed reduplication in the reduplication system of Tamiang Malay: reduplication with initial affixes (prefixes) and reduplication with combined affixes (prefixes and suffixes). Examples of reduplication with initial affixes include:

- ngelompek-lompek 'to jump around'
- belari-lari 'to run around'
- tetukor-tukor 'to get interchanged multiple times'

Examples of reduplication with combined affixes include:

- nakut-nakuti 'to keep scaring'
- ditawor-taworke 'to keep getting offered'
- selambek-lambeknye 'as slow as possible'

Partial reduplication in Tamiang Malay is relatively rare. Examples of partial reduplication include:

- peperdu 'trees'
- tetanggo 'neighbors'
- beberapo 'how much'

Lastly, triple reduplication in Tamiang Malay, also known as trilingga, refers to a pattern where a word or morpheme is repeated three times. It typically involves the vowels /a/ and /u/ and is generally used for sound effects. Examples include:

- tang-ting-tung 'sound of iron being struck'
- hang-hing-hing 'sound of a vehicle'
- dar-dir-dur 'sound of thunder

=== Nouns ===
Nouns are words that refer to objects and anything that is objectified. Nouns can essentially be divided into two types: concrete nouns and abstract nouns. Examples of concrete nouns are:

- urang 'person'
- rumah 'house'

Examples of abstract nouns are:

- jin 'jinn'
- mlikek 'angel'

Nouns can also be categorized into root nouns, affixed nouns, compound nouns, and reduplicated nouns. Examples of root nouns include:

- bulu 'feather'
- cangkul 'hoe'

Examples of affixed nouns include:

- makanan 'foods'
- kebungnye 'his/her garden'

Examples of compound nouns include:

- tanggung jawab 'responsibility'
- tando tangan 'signature'

Examples of reduplicated nouns include:

- buku-buku 'books'
- padi-padian 'paddies'

=== Verbs ===
Verbs are words that express actions, deeds, movements, or activities. In Tamiang Malay, verbs generally function as predicates. There are several types of verbs in Tamiang Malay, including transitive verbs, intransitive verbs, passive verbs, active verbs, reciprocal verbs (which express mutual actions), reflexive verbs (where the subject is both the doer and the receiver of the action), and stative verbs. Examples of transitive verbs are:

- Adi tengah mbaco buku 'Younger sibling is reading a book'
- Mo tengah nanak nasi 'Mother is cooking rice'

Examples of intransitive verbs are:

- lkan ngeloyon 'The fish is swimming'
- Erna nyabak 'Erna is crying'

Passive verbs can be distinguished by the presence or absence of a prefix. Examples without a prefix includes:

- Anak nye kito dukung 'We are carrying the child'
- Rumahnye kami uwani 'We're waiting for the house'

Examples with a prefix includes:

- Buku ye kubaco 'I'm reading that book'
- Lembu ye didengkapnye hampe ke jalan 'The cow was chased by him all the way to the street.'

Active verbs can also be distinguished by the presence or absence of a prefix. Examples without a prefix includes:

- Dionye makan nasi 'He/she is eating rice'
- Ayah minum ubek 'Dad is drinking medicine'

Examples with a prefix includes:

- Pling urang ndengo ngan mende 'Everyone listened attentively'
- Amir bekerjo ngan gigeh 'Amir works diligently'

Examples of reciprocal verbs are:

- betumbok 'to punch'
- beperang 'to go to war'

Examples of reflexive verbs are:

- Dapo berieh 'older sibling is dressing up'
- Buayo bejemur 'The crocodile is basking in the sun'

Examples of stative verbs are:

- datang 'to come'
- pulang 'go home'

=== Adjectives ===
Adjectives are words that describe or explain nouns or things that are objectified. Adjectives can be categorized into root adjectives, affixed adjectives, reduplicated adjectives, and compound adjectives. Examples of root adjectives are:

- mahal 'expensive'
- rajing 'diligent'

Examples of affixed adjectives are:

- berseri 'radiant'
- tebodoh 'stupidest'

Examples of reduplicated adjectives are:

- kebaret-baretan 'westernized'
- sepande-pandenye 'as clever as'

Examples of compound adjectives are:

- muluk manih 'sweet-talking'
- besor kepalo 'arrogant'

=== Pronouns ===
Pronouns in Tamiang Malay can be divided into personal pronouns, possessive pronouns, demonstrative pronouns, interrogative pronouns, indefinite pronouns, and relative pronouns.

==== Personal pronouns ====
This table shows an overview over the most commonly and widely used personal pronouns in Tamiang Malay.

Person	Singular	Plural		
Person	Singular	Neutral	Exclusive	Inclusive
1st person	ambo, ambe, awak, aku		kami	kite, kito
2nd person	engko, ngko, ko, kau			
3rd person	dio, die	urang ye, urang yan, mereke		

Personal pronouns can also be attached to nouns. For example:

- rumahku 'my house'
- barangnye 'his/her things'

Possessive pronouns

Possessive pronouns are in the form of personal pronouns and personal pronoun suffixes attached to the end of a noun to indicate ownership. For example:

- anak ambo 'my child'
- baju engko 'your clothes'
- sabit dio 'his sickle'

When there is more than one possessive pronoun, they are expressed consecutively. For example:

- rumah adi ayah ambo 'my father's younger sibling's house'
- anak abang guru kami 'our teacher's older brother's child'

==== Demonstrative pronouns ====
In Tamiang Malay, similar to Indonesian and other Malay dialects, there are two types of demonstrative pronouns: ne meaning "this" to indicate something close to the speaker, and ye meaning "that" to indicate things or something distant from the speaker.

==== Interrogative pronouns ====
Examples of interrogative pronouns in Tamiang Malay are:

- hapo 'who'
- di mano 'where'
- ke mano 'where to'

==== Indefinite pronouns ====
There are two types of indefinite pronouns: (1) indefinite pronouns for objects and (2) indefinite pronouns for people. This classification aligns with the indefinite pronouns in Indonesian and other Malay dialects. Examples of indefinite pronouns for object are:

- ngakalo-ngakalo 'next time'
- maye-maye 'anything'
- yang mano 'which one'

. Examples of indefinite pronouns for people are:

- seseorang 'someone'
- barang hapo 'whose item'
- orang-orang 'people'

==== Relative pronouns ====
In Tamiang Malay, there are two relative pronouns: tempat ('place') and yang ('which'). In its usage, these relative pronouns align with the usage of relative pronouns in Indonesian and Malay.

== Vocabulary ==
Tamiang Malay's vocabulary has been influenced by Acehnese, the dominant language in Aceh, and Indonesian, the official language of Indonesia. The growing influence of Indonesian has led many people in Tamiang, particularly the younger generation, to frequently code-switch between Tamiang Malay and Indonesian. Additionally, it has incorporated loanwords from Arabic, due to the spread of Islam in Aceh, as well as Dutch, as a result of the Dutch colonization of the region. Below are examples of commonly used Tamiang Malay vocabulary along with their Indonesian and English translations:

=== Numerals ===
Number	Tamiang Malay	Indonesian	English
1	hatu, satu	satu	one
2	duo, due	dua	two
3	tigo, tige	tiga	three
4	empek	empat	four
5	limo, lime	lima	five
6	nam, enam	enam	six
7	tujoh	tujuh	seven
8	lapan, delapan	delapan	eight
9	sembilan	sembilan	nine
10	sepuloh	sepuluh	ten
11	sebelas	sebelas	eleven
20	duo puloh, due puloh	dua puluh	twenty
50	limo puloh, lime puloh	lima puluh	fifty
100	seratus	seratus	one hundred
500	limo ratus, lime ratus	lima ratus	five hundred
1000	seribu	seribu	one thousand
5000	limo ribu, lime ribu	lima ribu	five thousand
100,000	seratus ribu	seratus ribu	one hundred thousand
1000,000	hatu jute, hatu juto	satu juta	one million

=== Directions ===
Tamiang Malay	Indonesian	English
ne	ini	this
ye, yae, yan	itu	that
hini	sini	here
sane	sana	there
dihini	disini	over here
disane	disana	over there
kat	kepada	to
kiri	kiri	left
kanan	kanan	right
atas	atas	up
bawah	bawah	down
utara	utara	north
selatan	selatan	south
timur	timur	east
barat	barat	west

=== Personal Pronouns ===
Tamiang Malay	Indonesian	English
ambo, ambe, awak, aku	aku, saya	I
engko, ngko, ko, kau	kamu, engkau	you
kite, kito	kita	we (inclusive)
kami	kami	we (exclusive)
urang ye, urang yan, mereke	mereka	they/them
dio, die	dia	he/she

=== Interrogatives Pronouns ===
Tamiang Malay	Indonesian	English
ape, apo	apa	what
hape, hapo	siapa	who
nape	kenapa, mengapa	why
mane, mano	mana	where
bile, mengkale	kapan	when
macem mane	bagaimana	how
berape	berapa	how much

=== Nouns ===
Tamiang Malay	Indonesian	English
laki-laki	laki-laki	men
empuan	perempuan	female
urang	orang	person
mate	mata	eye
hidong	hidung	nose
telinge	telinga	ear
tangan	tangan	hand
kaki	kaki	leg
kulit	kulit	skin
kepale	kepala	head
eko, ekor	ekor	tail
aye	air	water
pase	pasir	sand
mateari	matahari	sun
bulan	bulan	moon
unggas, unggaeh	burung	bird
ikan	ikan	fish
kerbo	kerbau	buffalo
rimo	harimau	tiger
telo	telur	egg

=== Verbs ===
Tamiang Malay	Indonesian	English
minom	minum	to drink
makan	makan	to eat
kike	gigit	to bite
keleh	lihat	to see
denga	dengar	to hear
tido	tidur	to sleep
rase	rasa	to taste
mandi	mandi	to shower
tahu	tahu	to know
menenang	berenang	to swim
dudok	duduk	to sit
enjok	beri	to give
cium	cium	to kiss
datang	datang	to come
bediri	berdiri	to stand
bejalan	berjalan	walking
becakap	berbicara	talking

=== Adjectives ===
Tamiang Malay	Indonesian	English
angat	panas	hot
sejok	dingin, sejuk	cold
penoh	penuh	full
baru	baru	new
lame	usang, lama, tua	old
baek, afdal	baik	good
rusak	rusak	broken
panjang	panjang	long
bulut	basah	wet
tinggi	tinggi	tall
rendah	rendah	short
kosong	kosong	empty
sedeh	sedih	sad
seneng	senang, gembira	happy
marah	marah	angry
berani	berani	brave
takot	takut	scary

== Writing system ==
Like other Malay dialects, Tamiang Malay has traditionally been written in the Jawi alphabet, also known as Arab-Melayu. The Jawi script entered Tamiang along with the spread of Islam in Aceh, becoming a prominent medium for written communication as Islamic influence grew, particularly with the rise of Islamic kingdoms and sultanates in the region around the 13th century. During this period, Jawi was not only used in religious texts but also in official documents, literature, and correspondence, cementing its role as a vehicle for both cultural and administrative expression. However, in modern times, the usage of Jawi script in Tamiang has sharply declined. Today, the Jawi script is rarely used in day-to-day communication and has been largely replaced by the Latin alphabet, though it remains a cultural symbol and is occasionally used in traditional or religious contexts. Some madrasahs in Tamiang continue to preserve the use of the Jawi alphabet, particularly in religious sermons and Quranic recitations.

== Bibliography ==
- Sulaiman, Budiman; Ismail, M. Ridwan; Usman, Umar; Akbar, Orra M.; Agani, Mahdy Fuad (1993). Tata Bahasa Tamiang [Structure of the Tamiang language] (PDF) (in Indonesian). Jakarta: Agency for Language Development and Cultivation. ISBN 979-459-298-6.
- Hanafiah, M. Adnan; Faridan, Abdullah; Ali, Zainal; Yunus, Bakhrum (1986). Morfosintaksis Bahasa Tamiang [Morphosyntax of the Tamiang language] (PDF) (in Indonesian). Jakarta: Agency for Language Development and Cultivation.
- Wildan; Faridan, Abdullah; Sa'adiah; Harun, Mohd. (1998). Struktur Sastra Lisan Tamiang [Structure of Tamiang Oral Literature] (PDF) (in Indonesian). Jakarta: Agency for Language Development and Cultivation. ISBN 979-459-818-6.
- Yusuf, Husni; Ajies, A. Murad Em; Yahya, Zainuddin (1990). Sistem Perulangan Bahasa Tamiang [Reduplication system in the Tamiang language] (PDF) (in Indonesian). Jakarta: Agency for Language Development and Cultivation.
- Wan Diman, Mutasir (2003). Tamiang dalam Lintasan Sejarah [Tamiang in the Course of History] (in Indonesian). Kuala Simpang: Yayasan Sri Ratu Syafiatuddin.
- Wan Diman, Mutasir (2019). Kamus Bahasa Melayu Tamiang - Indonesia [Tamiang Malay - Indonesian dictionary] (in Indonesian). Banda Aceh: CV Maulana Grafika.
